= Mal Waldron discography =

Mal Waldron was a jazz pianist and composer. His appearances on record date from 1952 to 2002 and include more than 100 albums under his own name and more than 80 as a sideman. His writing for film soundtracks is also listed on this page.

== Discography ==
=== As leader/co-leader ===
Year recorded	Title	Label	Year released	Personnel/Notes
1956	Mal-1	Prestige	1957	With Idrees Sulieman (trumpet), Gigi Gryce (alto sax), Julian Euell (bass), Arthur Edgehill (drums)
1957	Mal/2	Prestige	1957	With Bill Hardman and Idrees Sulieman (trumpet; separately), Jackie McLean and Sahib Shihab (alto sax; separately), John Coltrane (tenor sax), Julian Euell (bass), Art Taylor and Ed Thigpen (drums; separately)
1957	The Dealers	Status	1964	With Bill Hardman (trumpet), John Coltrane and Paul Quinichette (tenor sax), Frank Wess (tenor sax, flute), Jackie McLean (alto sax), Julian Euell and Doug Watkins (bass; separately), Art Taylor (drums)
1958	Mal/3: Sounds	New Jazz	1958	With Art Farmer (trumpet), Eric Dixon (flute), Calo Scott (cello), Julian Euell (bass), Elvin Jones (drums), Elaine Waldron (vocals; two tracks)
1958	Just Wailin'	New Jazz	1958	With Herbie Mann, Charlie Rouse and Kenny Burrell
1958	Mal/4: Trio	New Jazz	1958	With Addison Farmer (bass), Kenny Dennis (drums)
1959	Left Alone	Bethlehem	1959	With Jackie McLean (alto sax; one track only), Julian Euell (bass), Al Dreares (drums); Waldron talks about Billie Holiday on one track
1959	Impressions	New Jazz	1959	With Addison Farmer (bass), Albert Heath (drums)
1959	The Blues Minus You	Music Minus One	1975	With Wendell Marshall (bass), Charles Perry (drums)
1960	Moonglow and Stardust	Music Minus One	1960	With Wendell Marshall (bass), Charles Perry (drums)
1960	The Music Of Duke Ellington	Music Minus One	?	With Wendell Marshall and Addison Farmer (bass; separately), Charles Perry and Ed Shaughnessy (drums; separately)
1960	The Music Of Jimmy McHugh	Music Minus One	?	With George Duvivier (bass), Ed Shaughnessy (drums)
1960	Mal Waldron	Music Minus One	?	With unknown (bass), unknown (drums)
1960	For Singers 'n Swingers	Music Minus One	1960	With George Duvivier (bass), Ed Shaughnessy (drums)
1961	The Quest	New Jazz	1962	With Eric Dolphy (alto sax, bass clarinet), Booker Ervin (tenor sax), Ron Carter (cello), Joe Benjamin (bass) Charlie Persip (drums)
1961	Fun with Brushes	Music Minus One	?	With Addison Farmer (bass), Charles Perry (drums)
1961	Blue Drums	Music Minus One	?	With Wendell Marshall (bass), Charles Perry (drums)
1963?	Les Nuits de la Negritude	Powertree	1963	With George Tucker (bass), Al Dreares (drums)
1966	All Alone	GTA	1966	Solo piano
1966?	Mal Waldron Trio	Karim	1966	With Giovanni Tommaso (bass), Pepito Pignatelli (drums)
1967	Sweet Love, Bitter	Impulse!	1967	With Dave Burnes (trumpet), George Coleman (tenor saxophone, alto saxophone), Charles Davis (baritone saxophone), Richard Davis and George Duvivier (bass; separately), Al Dreares (drums); soundtrack album
1969	Ursula	Musica	1969	With Patrice Caratini (bass), Franco Manzecchi (drums)
1969	Set Me Free	Affinity	1984	With Barre Phillips, (bass) Philly Joe Jones (drums)
1969	Free at Last	ECM	1970	With Isla Eckinger (bass), Clarence Beckton (drums)
1970	Tokyo Bound	RCA Victor	1970	With Yasuo Arakawa (bass), Takeshi Inomata (drums)
1970	Tokyo Reverie	RCA Victor	1970	Solo piano
1970	Blood and Guts	Futura	1970	With Patrice Caratini (bass), Guy Hayat (drums)
1970	Spanish Bitch	ECM (Japan)	1970	With Isla Eckinger (bass), Fred Braceful (drums, percussion)
1970	The Opening	Futura	1970	Solo piano
1971	The Call	JAPO	1971	With Jimmy Jackson (organ), Eberhard Weber (electric bass), Fred Braceful (drums, percussion)
1970	Mal: Live 4 to 1	Philips	1971	Solo piano on 5 tracks; duo with Masabumi Kikuchi (piano) on 2 tracks; trio with Isao Suzuki (bass), Yoshiyuki Nakamura (drums) on 2 tracks; quartet with Kohsuke Mine (alto saxophone), Suzuki, Nakamura on 2 tracks; in concert
1971	First Encounter	RCA Victor	1971	Co-led with Gary Peacock (bass); with Hiroshi Murakami (drums)
1971	Number Nineteen	Freedom	1971	With Dick Van Der Capellen (bass), Martin Van Duynhoven (drums)
1971	Black Glory	Enja	1971	With Jimmy Woode (bass), Pierre Favre (drums)
1971	Mal Waldron Plays the Blues	Enja	1971	With Jimmy Woode (bass), Pierre Favre (drums)
1971	Signals	Freedom	1971	Solo piano
1971	Journey Without End	RCA Victor	1972	Co-led with Steve Lacy (soprano sax); with Kent Carter (bass) and Noel McGhie (drums)
1972	Blues for Lady Day	Black Lion	1973	Solo piano
1972	A Little Bit of Miles	Freedom	1974	With Henk Haverhoek (bass), Pierre Courbois (drums)
1972?	Jazz a Confronto 19	Horo	1972	Solo piano
1972	A Touch of the Blues	Enja	1975	With Jimmy Woode (bass), Allen Blairman (drums)
1972	Mal Waldron on Steinway	Teichiku	1973	Solo piano
1972	Mal Waldron with the Steve Lacy Quintet	America (France)	1972	With Steve Lacy (soprano sax), Steve Potts (alto sax), Irene Aebi (cello), Kent Carter (bass), Noel McGhie (drums, percussion)
1972	The Whirling Dervish	America (France)	1972	With Peter Warren (bass), Noel McGhie (drums)
1972	Meditations	RCA Victor	1972	Solo piano
1973	Up Popped the Devil	Enja	1974	With Carla Poole (flute; one track only), Reggie Workman (bass), Billy Higgins (drums)
1974	Hard Talk	Enja	1974	With Manfred Schoof (cornet), Steve Lacy (soprano sax), Isla Eckinger (bass), Allen Blairman (drums); in concert
1976	Like Old Times	Victor	1976	Co-led with Jackie McLean (alto sax); with Isao Suzuki (bass), Billy Higgins (drums)
1977	One-Upmanship	Enja	1977	Quinted (Manfred Schoof (trumpet), Jimmy Woode (bass) and Makaya Ntshoko (drums)) plus Steve Lacy (soprano sax)
1978	Moods	Enja	1978	With Terumasa Hino (trumpet), Hermann Breuer (trombone), Steve Lacy (soprano sax), Cameron Brown (bass), Makaya Ntshoko (drums) on 3 tracks; solo piano on 7 tracks
1979	Mingus Lives	Enja	1979	Solo piano
1981	Mal 81	Progressive	1981	With George Mraz (bass), Al Foster (drums)
1981	[[News: Run About Mal]]	Progressive	1982	With George Mraz (bass), Al Foster (drums)
1981	Snake Out	Hathut	1982	Co-led with Steve Lacy (soprano sax)
1981	Herbe de l'oubli	Hathut	1983	Co-led with Steve Lacy (soprano sax)
1981	Let's Call This	Hathut	1986	Co-led with Steve Lacy (soprano sax) [2LP]
1981	Live at Dreher, Paris 1981	Hathut	1981	Co-led with Steve Lacy (soprano sax); compiles Snake Out, Herbe de l'oubli and Let's Call This, with additional tracks
1981	What It Is	Enja	1981	With Clifford Jordan (tenor sax), Cecil McBee (bass), Dannie Richmond (drums)
1982	One Entrance, Many Exits	Palo Alto	1983	With Joe Henderson (tenor sax), David Friesen (bass), Billy Higgins (drums)
1982	In Retrospect	Baybridge	1982	With Akira Miyazawa (tenor sax, flute), Isao Suzuki (bass), Hironobu Fujisawa (drums)
1983	Breaking New Ground	Baybridge	1983	With Reggie Workman (bass), Ed Blackwell (drums)
1983	Mal Waldron Plays Eric Satie	Baybridge	1984	With Reggie Workman (bass), Ed Blackwell (drums)
1983	You and the Night and the Music	Paddle Wheel	1984	With Reggie Workman (bass), Ed Blackwell (drums)
1984	Encounters	Muse	1985	Co-led with David Friesen (bass)
1985	Mal Waldron and Alone	CBS/Sony	1985	Solo piano
1985	Songs of Love and Regret	Freelance Records	1986	Co-led with Marion Brown (alto sax)
1985	Dedication	Soul Note	1988	Co-led with David Friesen (bass)
1985	Piano Duo Live at Pit Inn	CBS/Sony	1988	Co-led duo with Yōsuke Yamashita (piano)
1986	Space	Vent du Sud	1986	With Michel Marre (trumpet, flugelhorn), Doudou Gouirand (alto sax, soprano sax), Joel Allouche (tabla; one track)
1986	Sempre Amore	Soul Note	1987	With Steve Lacy (soprano sax; co-leader)
1986	Update	Soul Note	1987	Solo piano
1986	Left Alone '86	Paddle Wheel	1987	Co-led with Jackie McLean (alto sax); with Herbie Lewis (bass), Eddie Moore (drums)
1986	The Git Go – Live at the Village Vanguard	Soul Note	1987	With Woody Shaw (trumpet), Charlie Rouse (tenor sax, flute), Reggie Workman (bass), Ed Blackwell (drums)
1986	The Seagulls of Kristiansund	Soul Note	1987	Personnel as The Git Go - Live at the Village Vanguard
1987	Both Sides Now	Century	1987	Solo piano
1987	Our Colline's a Treasure	Soul Note	1987	With Leonard Jones (bass), Sangoma Everett (drums)
1987	Remembering the Moment	Soul Note	1994	With Julian Priester (trombone), Jim Pepper (tenor sax), David Friesen (bass), Eddie Moore (drums)
1987	The Super Quartet Live at Sweet Basil	Paddle Wheel	1987	With Steve Lacy (soprano sax), Reggie Workman (bass), Eddie Moore (drums)
1987	Mal, Dance and Soul	Tutu	1988	With Ed Schuller (bass), John Betsch (drums), Jim Pepper (tenor sax; four tracks)
1988	Evidence	Dark Light	1991	Solo piano
1988	Art of the Duo	Tutu	1989	With Jim Pepper (tenor sax, soprano sax)
1988	No More Tears (For Lady Day)	Timeless	1989	With Paulo Cardoso (bass), John Betsch (drums)
1989–90	Into the Light	Materiali Sonori	1990	With Christian Burchard (vibes), Michael Schone (bass), Dieter Serfas (percussion); also known as Duo, Solo, Quartet
1989	Crowd Scene	Soul Note	1989	With Sonny Fortune (alto sax), Ricky Ford (tenor sax), Reggie Workman (b), Eddie Moore (d)
1989	Where Are You?	Soul Note	1989?	The same personnel as on Crowd Scene
1989	Quadrologue at Utopia	Tutu	1990	With Jim Pepper (tenor sax, soprano sax), Ed Schuller (bass), John Betsch (drums)
1989	More Git' Go at Utopia	Tutu	1994	With Jim Pepper (tenor sax, soprano sax), Ed Schuller (bass), John Betsch (drums)
1990	Spring in Prague	Alfa Jazz	1990	With Paulo Cardoso (bass), John Betsch (drums)
1990	Hot House	Arista/Novus	1991	Co-led with Steve Lacy (soprano sax)
1992	I Remember Thelonious	Nel Jazz	1996	Co-led with Steve Lacy (soprano sax)
1993	Let's Call This... Esteem	Slam	1993	Co-led with Steve Lacy (soprano sax); in concert
1993	My Dear Family	Evidence	1994	With Eddie Henderson (trumpet, flugelhorn), Grover Washington Jr. (soprano sax; 3 tracks), Reggie Workman (bass), Pheeroan Ak Laff (drums)
1994	Waldron-Haslam	Slam	1994	Co-led with George Haslam (baritone sax)
1994	After Hours	Owl	1994	Co-led with Jeanne Lee (vocals)
1994	Mingus, Monk, and Mal	Freelance	1995	Co-led with Judy Niemack (vocals)
1994	Communiqué	Soul Note	1997	Co-led with Steve Lacy (soprano sax)
1994	Mal, Verve, Black & Blue	Tutu	1996	With Nicolas Simion (tenor sax), Ed Schuller (bass), Victor Jones (drums)
1995	Explorations... to the Mth Degree	Slam	1996	Co-led with Max Roach (drums); in concert [2CD]
1995	Two New	Slam	1995	Co-led with George Haslam (baritone sax)
1995	Maturity 2: He's My Father	Tokuma	2003	With Mala Waldron (piano, vocals)
1995	Maturity 3: 'Dual	Tokuma	1996	With Takeo Moriyama (drums)
1995	Maturity 4: White Road, Black Rain	Tokuma	2003	With Toru Tenda (flute), Jeanne Lee (vocals)
1995	Travellin' in Soul Time	Bvhaast	1997	With Jeanne Lee (vocals), Toru Tenda (flute); in concert
1995	Art of the Duo: The Big Rochade	Tutu	1998	With Nicolas Simion (soprano sax, tenor sax, bass clarinet)
1995	The Mighty Warriors: Live in Antwerp	Elemental	2024	With Steve Lacy (soprano sax), Reggie Workman (bass), Andrew Cyrille (drums)
1995–99	Mal Waldron	Tokuma	2003	Solo piano
1996	Maturity 5: The Elusiveness of Mt. Fuji	Tokuma	1997	Solo piano
1997	Soul Eyes	BMG	1997	Featuring Jeanne Lee and Abbey Lincoln (vocals)
1998	Maturity 1: Klassics	Tokuma	1999	With Yoshihiko Katori (vibes), Kengo Nakamura (bass) on some tracks
2000	Riding a Zephyr	Soul Note	2002	With Judi Silvano (vocals)
2001	Silence	Justin Time	2008	Co-led duo with David Murray (tenor sax, bass clarinet)
2002	One More Time	Sketch	2002	With Steve Lacy (soprano sax), Jean-Jacques Avenel (bass)
2002	Left Alone Revisited	Enja	2002	Co-led duo with Archie Shepp (tenor sax, vocals)

=== Albums as sideman ===
Year recorded	Leader	Title	Label
1956	Gene Ammons	Jammin' with Gene	Prestige
1957	Gene Ammons	Funky	Prestige
1957	Gene Ammons	Jammin' in Hi Fi with Gene Ammons	Prestige
1958	Gene Ammons	The Big Sound	Prestige
1958	Gene Ammons	Groove Blues	Prestige
1958	Gene Ammons	Blue Gene	Prestige
1962	Gene Ammons	Velvet Soul	Prestige
1962	Gene Ammons	Angel Eyes	Prestige
1962	Gene Ammons	Sock!	Prestige
1968	Benny Bailey	Soul Eyes	MPS
1958	Betty Blake	Betty Blake Sings in a Tender Mood	Bethlehem
1956	Kenny Burrell	All Night Long	Prestige
1957	Kenny Burrell	Earthy	Prestige
1957	Kenny Burrell (and Jimmy Raney)	2 Guitars	Prestige
1980	Roy Burowes	Live at the Dreher	Marge
1961	Ron Carter	Where?	Prestige
1956	Teddy Charles	The Teddy Charles Tentet	Atlantic
1957	Teddy Charles	Vibe-Rant	Elektra
1960	Teddy Charles	Jazz In The Garden At The Museum Of Modern Art	Warwick
1957	John Coltrane	Dakar	Prestige
1957	John Coltrane (and Paul Quinichette)	Cattin' with Coltrane and Quinichette	Prestige
1957	John Coltrane	Coltrane	Prestige
1969	Nathan Davis	Jazz Concert in a Benedictine Monastery	Edici
1961	Eric Dolphy	At the Five Spot, Volume 1	Prestige
1961	Eric Dolphy	At the Five Spot, Volume 2	Prestige
1961	Eric Dolphy	Memorial Album	Prestige
1957	Ray Draper	Tuba Sounds	Prestige
1981	Johnny Dyani	Some Jive Ass Boer	Jazz Unité
1967	Embryo	For Eva	Disconforme
1970	Embryo	Steig aus	Brain
1971	Embryo	Rocksession	Brain
1989	Embryo	Turn Peace	Schneeball
2010*	Embryo	40	Trikont
1966	Duško Gojković	Swinging Macedonia	Philips
1960	Bennie Green	Hornful of Soul	Bethlehem
1971	Sonny Grey	Skippin'	Numera
1972	Terumasa Hino	Reminiscent Suite	Victor (Japan)
1957	Billie Holiday	Ella Fitzgerald and Billie Holiday at Newport	Verve
1958	Billie Holiday	Lady in Satin	Columbia
1958	Billie Holiday	Easy to Remember	Society
1958	Billie Holiday	Billie Holiday at Monterey 1958	Black Hawk
1961	Etta Jones	So Warm	Prestige
1957	Thad Jones	After Hours	Prestige
1971	Kimiko Kasai	One for Lady	JVC/Victor (Japan)
1958	Steve Lacy	Reflections	New Jazz
1961	John LaPorta	Eight Men in Search of a Drummer	Music Minus One
1961	Abbey Lincoln	Straight Ahead	Candid
1955	Teo Macero	What's New?	Columbia
1957	Teo Macero	Teo	Prestige
1959	Teo Macero	Something New, Something Blue	Columbia
1958	Mary Ann McCall	Detour to the Moon	Jubilee
1955	Jackie McLean	Presenting... Jackie McLean	Ad Lib
1956	Jackie McLean	4, 5 and 6	Prestige
1956	Jackie McLean	Jackie's Pal	Prestige
1957	Jackie McLean	Jackie McLean & Co.	Prestige
1957	Jackie McLean	Makin' the Changes	Prestige
1957	Jackie McLean	A Long Drink of the Blues	Prestige
1957	Jackie McLean	Strange Blues	Prestige
1957	Jackie McLean	McLean's Scene	Prestige
1954	Charles Mingus	Jazz Composers Workshop	Savoy
1955	Charles Mingus	Mingus at the Bohemia	Debut
1955	Charles Mingus	The Charles Mingus Quintet & Max Roach	Debut
1956	Charles Mingus	Pithecanthropus Erectus	Atlantic
1959	Charles Mingus	Blues & Roots	Atlantic
1957	The Prestige All Stars	Baritones and French Horns	Prestige
1957	The Prestige All Stars	Earthy	Prestige
1957	The Prestige All Stars	Four Altos	Prestige
1957	The Prestige All Stars	Olio	Prestige
1957	The Prestige All Stars	Interplay for 2 Trumpets and 2 Tenors	Prestige
1957	The Prestige All Stars	Coolin'	New Jazz
1957	The Prestige All Stars	After Hours	Prestige
1957	The Prestige All Stars	The Prestige Jazz Quartet	Prestige
1957	The Prestige All Stars	Wheelin' & Dealin'	Prestige
1957	Paul Quinichette	On the Sunny Side	Prestige
1961	Max Roach	Percussion Bitter Sweet	Impulse!
1962	Max Roach	It's Time	Impulse!
1962	Max Roach	Speak, Brother, Speak!	Impulse!
1982	Kazutoki Umezu	Another Step	Union Jazz
1957	Various	The Sound of Jazz	Columbia
1966	Various	Jazz Jamboree '66, Volume 1	Polskie Nagrania Muza
1979	Various	Jazzbühne Berlin 1979	Amiga
1979	Various	Jazz Na Koncertnom Podiju Vol. 4	Jugoton
1978	Klaus Weiss	Child's Prayer	EMI/Electrola
1979	Klaus Weiss	On Tour	Calig
1957	Phil Woods	Four Altos	Prestige
1983	Sumiko Yoseyama	With Mal	Continental
1961	Eldee Young	Eldee Young and Company	Argo
1957	Webster Young	For Lady	Prestige
1960	Earl Zindars (and Armando Peraza)	The Soul of Jazz Percussion	Warwick

=== Singles as sideman ===
Year recorded	Leader	Title	Label
1952	Ike Quebec	Whispering Winds / Kiss Of Fire	Hi-Lo
1952	Emmett Davis	Rippin' And Runnin' / Look What'cha Done	Hi-Lo
1953	The Wanderers	Heh Mae Ethel / We Could Find Happiness	Savoy
1953	Varetta Dillard	I Ain't Gonna Tell / (That's The Way) My Mind Is Working	Savoy

=== Soundtracks as composer ===
Year recorded	Leader	Title	Label
1964	Dizzy Gillespie	The Cool World	Philips
1965*		Three Rooms in Manhattan	
1967	Mal Waldron	Sweet Love, Bitter	Impulse!
1972*		George Who?	
1986*		Tokyo Blues	
