= Nuits de la Fondation Maeght (Albert Ayler album) =

Nuits de La Fondation Maeght

Studio album by Albert Ayler
- Released: 1971
- Recorded: Jul 27, 1970
- Genre: Jazz
- Length: 73:10
- Label: Shandar

Albert Ayler chronology
Music is the healing force of the universe (1969)	Nuits de La Fondation Maeght (1971)

Nuits de La Fondation Maeght is a live album by the American jazz saxophonist Albert Ayler recorded on July 27, 1970 at the Maeght Foundation in Saint-Paul-de-Vence, France, and originally released in 1971 in two volumes on the Shandar label. The album documents one of the last known performances by Ayler prior to his death in November of that year.

== Background ==
In 1970, Daniel Caux, a writer and painter associated with the Fluxus movement, was asked by the Maeght Foundation to curate an art exhibition, the focus of which was the United States. The foundation also requested that Caux put together a series of concerts of contemporary music in conjunction with the event, and he chose two areas that he felt were interesting and representative of musical activities in the U.S. at the time: minimalist music and free jazz. With regard to the former style, he invited Terry Riley and La Monte Young; with regard to free jazz, he invited Albert Ayler and Sun Ra.

By 1970, Ayler's situation had become increasingly difficult. His recent records, such as New Grass, had received negative press and sold poorly, and Impulse! Records dropped him from the label, leading to financial difficulties. At the same time, Ayler apparently blamed himself for the breakdown suffered by his brother Donald, which caused friction within his family and additional stress. The opportunity to perform in France gave Ayler a chance to step away from this situation, and to revisit the country where he had played while in the army, and where he had developed an appreciation for martial music. Caux recalled: "In Saint-Paul-de-Vence Albert Ayler seemed happy, radiant. Even if, from time to time, one could notice a slight melancholy in his eyes... It was... optimism, enthusiasm, and spontaneous laugher that prevailed."

Caux arranged for Ayler and his band to perform at the Maeght Foundation on July 25 and 27. However, while traveling to France with the group, pianist Call Cobbs was detained at customs, causing him to arrive late and miss the first concert. Ayler's bagpipes were also damaged during the trip, and as a result they were difficult to use. Despite these setbacks, the group, which also included vocalist and saxophonist Mary Maria (Mary Parks), bassist Steve Tintweiss, and drummer Allen Blairman, performed the July 25 concert without Cobbs, resulting in the material that would be released on the album Live on the Riviera. According to David Keenan, Ayler dressed for the concert "like he had just beamed down from the mothership, sporting a white oriental dress and a sombrero."

During his stay, Ayler found time to visit the art exhibition, and became enamored with the paintings of Marc Chagall. He also participated in interviews with Caux and Kiyoshi Koyama of Swing Journal; these were recorded and later released on Holy Ghost: Rare & Unissued Recordings (1962–70). Cobbs arrived in time for the July 27 concert, and the performance elicited a very positive reaction from the audience. During the concert, Ayler turned to Cobbs and said "Let's play something I don't normally do... Let's play the blues." According to Cobbs, when the piece, identified as "Holy Family" on the track listing, concluded, "the people went wild about it". David Keenan wrote that "the Maeght concerts were a huge success and many people had to be turned away on the night."

Both concerts were filmed, and footage was later released by Jean-Michel Meurice as Albert Ayler: Le Dernier Concert. On July 28, Ayler played for an invited group of fans at La Colle-sur-Loup, where he was staying; recordings of four pieces performed that day were released on Holy Ghost: Rare & Unissued Recordings (1962–70). Following the success of the Maeght Foundation concerts, Caux began planning another concert, featuring Ayler, that would take place in early 1971, followed by a tour. These never came to pass, as Ayler was found dead in New York City in November 1970.

== Reception ==
Professional ratings
Review scores
Source	Rating
Allmusic	4.5/5 stars
The Penguin Guide to Jazz	2.5/4 stars

Scott Yanow, writing for AllMusic, called the album "quite memorable," stating that the recordings represent Ayler "at the height of his powers" in a context in which he is able to "stretch out and 'preach' in his emotional and unique style". In a review for All About Jazz, Mark Corroto wrote: "The significance of this historical recording is not its revelation but in the rawness of its presentation... Ayler peels away the accessibility that was his Impulse! recordings for a raw sound. He merely hints at the marches and the spirituals before erupting into stratospheres of sound... his deconstruction pares the music to its essence."

Val Wilmer called the album "the declaration of an artist who has considered all the possibilities, and now offers this as a refined statement of his musical self", and noted that "many of the figures, themes and the feeling itself sprang directly, unadorned, from the Black church... It often seemed as if the church were the very place for which this music was intended." In his liner notes, David Keenan wrote that the music "feels... like a last great summoning of powers... He draws on a huge reservoir of technique, digging deep into blues and gospel music and opening out to the roar of the cosmos... Ayler has rarely sounded so stately and - paradoxically - so at peace with himself... a lot of the material here feels as if he's finally come full circle, content to wrestle folk truths from the simplest of phrases, reducing the material to its most primal phonetics." He concludes by calling the recordings "uncomfortable epitaphs, sometimes exhilarating, sometimes frustrating but above all, reassuringly human".

Jeff Schwartz, bassist, Ayler biographer, and author of "Free Jazz: A Research and Information Guide", noted that the styles of Tintweiss and Blairman "do not fit with Cobbs and Ayler's work", but wrote: "Cobbs and Ayler have never sounded better together. The gospel feels groove hard, and their work is telepathic on the ballads, such as 'Spiritual Reunion' and 'Universal Message.' Ayler's saxophone mastery is at its apex, as he plays in every register of the horn with incredibly flexible tone, articulation, beautiful melodic ideas, and solo structure. He still uses the hysteria he had developed on his 1965-66 recordings, but it takes its place alongside blues, tragic ballad, diatonic (march/hoedown), and Coltrane-like styles in his palette. Albert's achievement here is to unite the entire history of the saxophone, and make it serve his improvisational whim."

In 1971, the album was awarded the Grand Prix International du Disque by the Charles Cros Academy, as well as an "In Memoriam" Prize by the Académie du Jazz.

== Track listing ==
=== Volume 1 ===
1. "In Heart Only" – 5:16
2. "Spirits (New Ghosts)" – 15:05
3. "Holy Family" – 11:44
4. "Spirits Rejoice" – 7:26

=== Volume 2 ===
1. "Truth Is Marching In" – 8:10
2. "Universal Message" – 8:17
3. "Spiritual Reunion" – 7:57
4. "Music Is the Healing Force of the Universe" – 10:00

Recorded July 27, 1970 at the Maeght Foundation in St. Paul de Vence, France.

== Musicians ==
- Albert Ayler (tenor saxophone, soprano saxophone)
- Mary Maria (vocals, soprano saxophone)
- Call Cobbs (piano)
- Steve Tintweiss (bass)
- Allen Blairman (drums)
