= ETC =

- Etc. or et cetera, a Latin expression meaning "and the other things" or "and the rest".

ETC or etc may also refer to:

== Companies and organizations ==
- ETC (Chilean TV channel), a Chilean cable television channel
- ETC (Philippine TV channel), a Philippine television network
- Zee ETC Bollywood, an Indian television channel
- Ethiopian Telecommunications Corporation, a telecommunications provider
- ETC Group (eco-justice), an American appropriate-technology organization
- Electric Telegraph Company, British Victorian company and ancestor of British Telecom
- European Technical Center, of the US National Security Agency
- European Travel Commission, a tourism agency
- Experimental Television Center, a 501(c)(3) nonprofit electronic and media art organization
- Experimental Theatre Club, at University of Oxford, England
- Electronic Theatre Controls, an American lighting and rigging company
- Entertainment Technology Center, at Carnegie Mellon University

== Science and technology ==
- Electron transport chain, in molecular biology
- Electronic throttle control, an automobile technology
- Electronic toll collection
- Electrothermal-chemical technology, in artillery
- Encyclopedia of Triangle Centers, an online list of points of a triangle
- Ericsson Texture Compression, an image compression algorithm
- /etc, a directory in Unix-like systems, see Unix file system#Conventional directory layout
- Extraterrestrial technological civilization
- Extratropical cyclone, in meteorology

== Finance ==
- Ethereum Classic cryptocurrency, ticker symbol
- Equipment trust certificate, a financial security
- Estimate to complete, in earned value management
- Exchange-traded commodity or currency or certificate; a type of exchange-traded product

== Transport ==
- ETC, the National Rail station code for Etchingham railway station, East Sussex, England
- Eastside Transit Corridor, a proposed light rail extension project in Los Angeles County, California
- Cadillac ETC, an automobile

== Other uses ==
- Etc (band), a Czech rock band
- Etc. (album), an album by punk rock band Jawbreaker
- ETC: A Review of General Semantics, a scholarly journal
- Etc, a special time zone area, see Tz database#Area
- Expressive therapies continuum, in art therapy

== See also ==
- ETC, enhanced tribal card, a travel document and proof of tribal enrollment
- ETCS, the signalling and control component of the European Rail Traffic Management System
- Etcetera (disambiguation)
