= Live on the Riviera =

Live album by Albert Ayler
- Released: 2005
- Recorded: July 25, 1970
- Genre: Jazz
- Length: 56:32
- Label: ESP-Disk

Live on the Riviera is a live album by the American jazz saxophonist Albert Ayler recorded on July 25, 1970, at the Maeght Foundation in Saint-Paul-de-Vence, France, and originally released in 2005 on the ESP-Disk label. The album, which was remastered and reissued by ESP-Disk in 2013, documents one of the last known performances by Ayler prior to his death in November of that year.

== Background ==
In 1970, Daniel Caux, a writer and painter associated with the Fluxus movement, was asked by the Maeght Foundation to curate an art exhibition, the focus of which was the United States. The foundation also requested that Caux put together a series of concerts of contemporary music in conjunction with the event, and he chose two areas that he felt were interesting and representative of musical activities in the U.S. at the time: minimalist music and free jazz. With regard to the former style, he invited Terry Riley and La Monte Young; with regard to free jazz, he invited Albert Ayler and Sun Ra.

By 1970, Ayler's situation had become increasingly difficult. His recent records, such as New Grass, had received negative press and sold poorly, and Impulse! Records dropped him from the label, leading to financial difficulties. At the same time, Ayler apparently blamed himself for the breakdown suffered by his brother Donald, which caused friction within his family and additional stress. The opportunity to perform in France gave Ayler a chance to step away from this situation, and to revisit the country where he had played while in the army, and where he had developed an appreciation for martial music. Caux recalled: "In Saint-Paul-de-Vence Albert Ayler seemed happy, radiant. Even if, from time to time, one could notice a slight melancholy in his eyes... It was... optimism, enthusiasm, and spontaneous laugher that prevailed."

Caux arranged for Ayler and his band to perform at the Maeght Foundation on July 25 and 27. However, while traveling to France with the group, pianist Call Cobbs was detained at customs, causing him to arrive late and miss the first concert. Ayler's bagpipes were also damaged during the trip, and as a result they were difficult to use. Despite these setbacks, the group, which also included vocalist and saxophonist Mary Maria (Mary Parks), bassist Steve Tintweiss, and drummer Allen Blairman, performed the July 25 concert without Cobbs, resulting in the material that would be released on Live on the Riviera. According to David Keenan, Ayler dressed for the concert "like he had just beamed down from the mothership, sporting a white oriental dress and a sombrero."

During his stay, Ayler found time to visit the art exhibition, and became enamored with the paintings of Marc Chagall. He also participated in interviews with Caux and Kiyoshi Koyama of Swing Journal; these were recorded and later released on Holy Ghost: Rare & Unissued Recordings (1962–70). Cobbs arrived in time for the July 27 concert, a recording of which was released in 1971 as Nuits de la Fondation Maeght, and the performance elicited a very positive reaction from the audience. During the concert, Ayler turned to Cobbs and said "Let's play something I don't normally do... Let's play the blues." According to Cobbs, when the piece, identified as "Holy Family" on the track listing, concluded, "the people went wild about it". David Keenan wrote that "the Maeght concerts were a huge success and many people had to be turned away on the night."

Both concerts were filmed, and footage was later released by Jean-Michel Meurice as Albert Ayler: Le Dernier Concert. On July 28, Ayler played for an invited group of fans at La Colle-sur-Loup, where he was staying; recordings of four pieces performed that day were released on Holy Ghost: Rare & Unissued Recordings (1962–70). Following the success of the Maeght Foundation concerts, Caux began planning another concert, featuring Ayler, that would take place in early 1971, followed by a tour. These never came to pass, as Ayler was found dead in New York City in November 1970.

== Reception ==
Professional ratings
Review scores
Source	Rating
Allmusic	3/5 stars
All About Jazz	4.5/5 stars
The Penguin Guide to Jazz	2.5/4 stars

Scott Yanow, writing for AllMusic, stated that Ayler "is in excellent form throughout, best on the playful 'Birth of Mirth' and his theme song, 'Ghosts.' Bassist Steve Tintweiss and drummer Allen Blairman work well with Ayler, making one regret that this group did not last longer and record a full set as a trio." However, Yanow also noted that "Maria's contributions lower the quality of the performances a bit for her singing on half the numbers and chanting on 'Music Is the Healing Force of the Universe' is an acquired taste and slightly inhibits the other musicians, taking up valuable space." In a review for All About Jazz, James Taylor wrote that the album "is a testament to the underappreciated brilliance of Ayler's music", and commented: "Perhaps some listeners are turned off by the way his sound so closely resembles the sound of the human voice, but in Ayler's playing there is pain and sadness as well as joy and playfulness. His tenor plunges the depths of human emotions. And that's not being overdramatic—there are plenty of superb recordings that capture this. Live on the Riviera is merely the latest to do so."

Writing for Pitchfork, Mark Richardson stated: "While [Mary Maria's] spoken words on 'Music Is the Healing Force of the Universe' are on the one hand painfully dated hippie drivel ('music causes all bad vibrations to faaaade away') there's something oddly fascinating about the clash between her sentiments and Ayler's insane screeches. He's screaming through his tenor, pinching it to sound like a kazoo as the force of his wind drives it up a few octaves, and yet Maria's words ('it makes one want to love instead of hate, it puts the mind in a healthy state of thought') imply that what they're doing is a universal expression of affection and warmth." Regarding the version of "Ghosts" that closes that album, Richardson wrote: "It's incredible to think of how many places Ayler could still take the tune. Sadly, within four months the ending would be final and his opportunities would cease."

In an article for All About Jazz, Mark Corroto noted that not only was Ayler without his keyboard player Call Cobbs, but that he was also without his brother Donald, who had suffered a breakdown. Corroto wrote: "The saxophonist carried the weight of this entire performance. He opens the night with a plaintive wail that scorches the curtains and thumps the chest. Mary Maria's spoken words deliver Ayler's philosophy, a true belief (it was the end of the 1960s) that revolution and peace could be attained through the popular movements of the people.... Ayler's voice delivered through multi-phonics and upper register tongues. He plays through his love of marches, some calypso, arriving in the end at 'Ghosts,' his signature tune. The crowd responds to the music, cheering and stomping. Or is that the beating of my heart?"

Clifford Allen, writing for Paris Transatlantic, commented: "What is immediately apparent with these Maeght sessions is that, among the rhythm sections that Ayler employed, Tintweiss and Blairman are the closest approximation of the Grimes-Murray team that graced some of his earlier recordings." He concludes: "This is vital music that deserves to be heard, and you can bet that there is more in Bernard Stollman's vaults just clamoring to be let out."

== Track listing ==
Tracks 1, 4, and 5 written by Mary Parks. Tracks 2, 6, and 7 written by Albert Ayler. Track 3 unattributed.

1. "Music Is the Healing Force of the Universe" – 7:47
2. "Birth of Mirth" – 10:38
3. "Masonic Inborn" – 7:18
4. "Oh! Love of Life" – 9:31
5. "Island Harvest" – 5:01
6. "Heart Love" – 5:24
7. "Ghosts" – 10:53

Recorded July 25, 1970 at the Maeght Foundation in St. Paul de Vence, France.

== Musicians ==
- Albert Ayler (tenor saxophone, soprano saxophone, vocals)
- Mary Maria (vocals, soprano saxophone)
- Steve Tintweiss (bass)
- Allen Blairman (drums)
