= Etcetera (disambiguation) =

Et cetera is a Latin expression that means "and other things" or "and so on".

Etcetera or Et Cetera may also refer to:

== Film, TV and theatre ==
- Etcetera (cat), a fictional character in Andrew Lloyd Webber's Cats
- Etcetera Theatre, a fringe venue for theatre and comedy
- Etcetera (TV program), a Philippine television program
- Et Cetera, a 1966 Czech film by Jan Švankmajer

== Music ==
- Etcetera Records, a Dutch/Belgian record label
- Etcetera, for orchestra & environmental tape (indeterminate) John Cage 1973

=== Bands ===
- Etc (Czech band), a Czech rock band
- Et Cetera (Montreal band), a 1970s French Canadian band
- Et Cetera (German band), 1971

=== Albums ===
- Et Cetera (album), a 1965 album by Wayne Shorter
- Et Cetera, a 1976 album by Canadian band Et Cetera
- Et Cetera, a 1971 album by German band Et Cetera
- Et Cetera..., a 2006 album by Serge Gainsbourg
- Et Cetera, a 2007 album by One Ok Rock
- Etc. (album), a 2002 album by Jawbreaker
- Etc., a 2000 album by Fulano de Tal
- Etc., a 2001 album by Lloyd Cole
- Etc. Etc. Etc., a 1970 album by Celia Cruz

=== Songs ===
- "Et Cetera" (song), Ireland's Eurovision 2009 entry performed by Sinéad Mulvey and Black Daisy
- "Etcetera" (song), a song by the Beatles
- "Etcetera", by Neil Innes from The Innes Book of Records
- "Etcetera", by R. Kelly from R. (R. Kelly album)
- "Etc", by Caetano Veloso from Estrangeiro

== Other uses ==
- Et Cetera (manga), a manga series
- Etcetera Etcetera, a drag queen from Canberra, Australia

== See also ==
- Stenoptilia etcetera, a moth
- ETC (disambiguation), for pages with the acronym E.T.C.
