= Art of the Duo =

Art of the Duo may refer to:

- Art of the Duo (Mal Waldron and Jim Pepper album) (Tutu, 1988)
- Art of the Duo (Lee Konitz and Albert Mangelsdorff album) (Enja, 1988)
