= The Opening (album) =

Live album by Mal Waldron
- Released: 1970
- Recorded: November 19, 1970
- Genre: Jazz
- Label: Futura
- Producer: Gérard Terronès

Mal Waldron chronology
Spanish Bitch (1970)	The Opening (1970)	The Call (1971)

The Opening is a live album by American jazz pianist Mal Waldron featuring a performance recorded in Paris in 1970 and released on the French Futura label.

== Track listing ==
All compositions by Mal Waldron

1. "Right On — 7:10
2. "Of Pigs And Panthers" — 9:15
3. "Cry Out" — 3:00
4. "Die Fludel" — 5:10
5. "Petite Gemaux" — 6:40
6. "Sieg Haile" — 10:00

- Recorded at the Centre Culturel Americain in Paris, France, on November 19, 1970.

== Personnel ==
- Mal Waldron – piano
