= Fred Braceful =

Jazz drummer

Fred Arthur Braceful (May 2, 1938 – March 17, 1995) was a jazz drummer.

== Early life ==
Braceful was born in Detroit on May 2, 1938. He played in his tenor saxophonist father's band early in his career. He served in the U.S. military in Germany, and then settled in Stuttgart.

== Later life and career ==
In Stuttgart he played with Wolfgang Dauner's trio from 1963, and in Dauner's group Et Cetera until the mid-1970s. Braceful also played with Albert Mangelsdorff, Abdullah Ibrahim, Joki Freund, Hans Koller, Bob Degen, Benny Bailey, Robin Kenyatta, and Manfred Schoof.

He and several Stuttgart jazz musicians formed the ensemble Moira in 1976. Following this Braceful played with Bernd Köppen and Jay Oliver. After his stint with Oliver in 1982, Braceful quit music for a period of time, then returned to play in Eugen de Ryck's group the Funkomatic Hippies from 1992 until 1995. He worked and recorded with saxophonist Michael Hornstein in the same period. Braceful died in Munich on March 17, 1995.

== Discography ==
With Wolfgang Dauner

- Dream Talk (CBS, 1964)
- Free Action (MPS, 1967)
- Requiem for Che Guevara with Fred van Hove (MPS, 1968)
- The Oimels (MPS, 1969)
- Wolfgang Dauner/Eberhard Weber/Jürgen Karg/Fred Braceful (Calig, 1969)
- Output (ECM, 1970)
- Rischkas Soul (MPS, 1970)
- Musica Sacra Nova II with Reinhold Finkbeiner (Schwann, 1970)
- Et Cetera (Global, 1971)
- Knirsch (MPS, 1972)
- Et Cetera Live (MPS, 1973)

With Mal Waldron

- Spanish Bitch (JVC/ECM, 1971)
- The Call (JAPO, 1971)

With Exmagma

- Exmagma (Neusi, 1973)
- Goldball (Disjuncta, 1975)
- 3 (Daily, 2006)

With others

- Echoes from the Prague Jazz Festival with Leo Wright, Benny Bailey (Supraphon Rec, 1964)
- Bob Degen, Celebrations (Calig, 1968)
- Robin Kenyatta, Girl from Martinique (ECM, 1970)
- Michael Hornstein, Langsames Blau (Enja, 1994)
- Chuck Henderson and Mal Waldron, Black Issues (Chazra, 1994)
