= Tokyo Bound =

Studio album by Mal Waldron
- Released: 1970
- Recorded: February 7 & 12, 1970
- Genre: Jazz
- Length: 45:06
- Label: RCA Victor (Japan)

Mal Waldron chronology
Free at Last (1969)	Tokyo Bound (1970)	Tokyo Reverie (1970)

Tokyo Bound is a studio album by American jazz pianist Mal Waldron recorded in Tokyo in 1970 and released on the Japanese RCA Victor label.

== Track listing ==
All compositions by Mal Waldron

1. "Japanese Island" — 10:34
2. "Rock One for Jimbosan" — 13:01
3. "Atomic Energy" — 8:50
4. "Mount Fuji" — 12:41

- Recorded in Tokyo, Japan on February 7 & 12, 1970.

== Personnel ==
- Mal Waldron — piano
- Yasuo Arakawa — bass
- Takeshi Inomata — drums
