= A Touch of the Blues =

A Touch of the Blues may refer to:

- A Touch of the Blues (Mal Waldron album), 1972
- A Touch of the Blues (Long John Baldry album), 1989
