= Mal Waldron Plays Eric Satie =

Studio album by Mal Waldron
- Released: 1984
- Recorded: December 8, 1983
- Genre: Jazz
- Label: Baybridge (Japan)
- Producer: Jeffrey Kaufman

Mal Waldron chronology
Breaking New Ground (1983)	Mal Waldron Plays Eric Satie (1984)	You and the Night and the Music (1983)

Mal Waldron Plays Eric Satie is an album by American jazz pianist Mal Waldron playing compositions by Erik Satie recorded in 1983 and released by the Japanese Baybridge label.

== Track listing ==
All compositions by Erik Satie

1. "Désespoir Agréable"
2. "Hermonies"
3. "Essais"
4. "Première Pensée Rose + Croix"
5. "Le Vilain Petit Vaurien"
6. "Three Gymnopédies, No. 1"

- Recorded in Tokyo, Japan on December 8, 1983

== Personnel ==
- Mal Waldron — piano
- Reggie Workman — bass
- Ed Blackwell — drums
