= Blues for Lady Day =

Studio album by Mal Waldron
- Released: 1973
- Recorded: February 5, 1972
- Genre: Jazz
- Length: 69:59
- Label: Freedom
- Producer: Alan Bates

Mal Waldron chronology
Journey Without End (1971)	Blues for Lady Day (1973)	A Little Bit of Miles (1971)

Blues for Lady Day (subtitled A Personal Tribute to Billie Holiday) is an album by American jazz pianist Mal Waldron, featuring performances recorded in Baarn, Holland, in 1972 and released on the Freedom label. The album was rereleased on CD on Black Lion Records in 1994 combined with tracks from A Little Bit of Miles.

== Reception ==
The AllMusic review by Scott Yanow stated that "the emphasis is on thoughtful (and sometimes a bit downbeat) interpretations at ballad tempoes".

Professional ratings
Review scores
Source	Rating
AllMusic	4.5/5 stars
Tom Hull	B+

== Track listing ==
1. "Blues for Lady Day" (Mal Waldron) — 3:43
2. "Just Friends" (John Klenner, Sam M. Lewis) — 4:04
3. "Don't Blame Me" (Jimmy McHugh, Dorothy Fields) — 3:20
4. "You Don't Know What Love Is" (Gene de Paul, Don Raye) — 5:38
5. "The Man I Love" (George Gershwin, Ira Gershwin) — 3:01
6. "You're My Thrill" (Jay Gorney, Sidney Clare) — 3:39
7. "Strange Fruit" (Abel Meeropol) — 2:47
8. "Easy Living" (Ralph Rainger, Leo Robin) — 4:48
9. "Mean to Me" (Fred E. Ahlert, Roy Turk) — 3:01
  - Recorded in Baarn, Holland, on February 5, 1972.

== Personnel ==
- Mal Waldron – piano
