= The Whirling Dervish =

Studio album by Mal Waldron
- Released: 1972
- Recorded: May 1972
- Genre: Jazz
- Length: 44:03
- Label: America
- Producer: Pierre Berjot

Mal Waldron chronology
Mal Waldron with the Steve Lacy Quintet (1972)	The Whirling Dervish (1972)	Meditations (1972)

The Whirling Dervish is an album by American jazz pianist Mal Waldron featuring performances recorded in Paris in 1972 and released by the French America label.

== Reception ==
The Allmusic review by Jason Ankeny awarded the album 4 stars stating "The Whirling Dervish looms among Mal Waldron's boldest and most challenging sessions -- its three epic compositions are intimidating in their scope and reach, but the music rewards the intellectual commitment it demands with some of the pianist's most inspired playing".

Professional ratings
Review scores
Source	Rating
Allmusic	4/5 stars

== Track listing ==
All compositions by Mal Waldron

1. "Reaching Out" — 25:24
2. "The Whirling Dervish" — 11:03
3. "Walk" — 7:36

- Recorded in Paris, France in May 1972.

== Personnel ==
- Mal Waldron — piano
- Peter Warren — bass
- Noel McGhie — drums
