= Mal, Dance and Soul =

Studio album by Mal Waldron
- Released: 1988
- Recorded: November 25, 1987
- Studio: Trixi, Munich
- Genre: Jazz
- Length: 71:07
- Label: Tutu
- Producer: Peter Wießmüller, Horst Weber

Mal Waldron chronology
| The Super Quartet Live at Sweet Basil (1987) | Mal, Dance and Soul (1988) | Evidence (1988) |

Mal, Dance and Soul is an album by jazz pianist Mal Waldron, recorded in 1987 and first released on the German Tutu label.

This was not the first time that Waldron was commissioned to record the first album for a newly founded record label (cf. ENJA and ECM). The day before Mal, Dance and Soul was recorded, Waldron had been engaged as a sideman for the Marty Cook Quartet featuring Jim Pepper for ENJA, the label that produced Red, White, Black & Blue at the famous Trixi Studio in Munich. Waldron's favourite drummer, John Betsch, was part of that line-up. This was clearly a golden opportunity – with a time tested and brilliant rhythm section right on the spot, comprising Betsch and Ed Schuller on bass - to record a trio album with Waldron.

Pepper had once jammed along with Waldron in Portland, Oregon. Reason enough to stroll into the studio suddenly in the course of the trio session, his sax under one arm, and to declare that he was very keen to join in. And as jazz history would have it, Waldron and Pepper playing in duo, conjured up the ballad "Soul Mates" like a rabbit out of a hat. At the end, some compositions like "Blue Monk", "Solar" and "Golden Golson" were recorded in quartet line-up, much more than a casual jam session. As all this material wouldn't have fit on a Vinyl LP, it was saved up and released later on a CD of the same name.

== Reception ==
Professional ratings
Review scores
| Source | Rating |
|---|---|
| AllMusic | 3/5 stars |

Chris Parker praises the rhythm section in the English magazine The Wire and outstanding pieces like "...'Dancing on the Flames', which features Waldron skipping, as if firewalking, through a delightful solo full of sudden splashes of colour and growling low-register patterns and the tender ballad 'Soul Mates' in duo with tenor player Jim Pepper. As for all the rest, it's simply the pianist-composer at his best – by turns lyrical and percussive, always imaginative!"

David Dupont wrote in the US jazz magazine Cadence: "Betch and Schuller lock into each other's groove like they'd on the road together for years. Betch echoing and completing the melody of 'Dancing on the Flames' ... the trio is at its best on the free multi-metered 'Little Acorn' and appropriately titled 'Blood and Guts'. 'A Bow to the Classics' is just that. Here Waldron's time is intentionally stiff not only on the head but during his solo contrasting with the flow of the bass and drums. This and the wispy waltz 'Little One' lack the intensity of the best trio as well."

In the German JazzPodium, Willie Gschwendner lets us know: "This Mal Waldron Trio belongs to a very special category of piano-trios. The degree of personal attention, of feeling and transcendence, of total musical communication that pours over the listener is the best of melodic and creative jazz that you could ever get to hear today ... Mal Waldron's madly percussive moments of playing, like in 'Dancing on the Flames', in which his exalted manner of approaching rhythm, urged on by Betch's beat - sworn to his drums - and Ed Schuller's walking bass, can be relished alternately with the reserved gliding along in the brilliant 'A Bow to the Classics'."

J.W. in the German Jazzthetik states that, "The chemistry of this trio is brilliant" and talks about "Mal Waldron's hypnotic repetition of tones, percussive rebounding and his profound absorption in the nature of sound and rhythm - there's something almost religious about his piano-playing, quite different from the esoteric or aetherial. The mind-set required for this performance is both relaxed and focussed, both casual and intensely centered – contradictions that are worked out and resolved with excellence whilst playing.

The great old master Mal Waldron has delivered a work of outstanding quality here. Far removed from every sort of sporty virtuosity, he abstracts melody to a few quintessential notes and from these, outlines icons of unheard dynamics, sets forth short phrases like polished stones from a collection, playful, with just a few annotations. A slow ballad imperceptibly becomes a thrilling climb through the harmonies, an alleotoric beginning is gently turned into rhythmic passion, while simpler means conjure quiet grandeur from the elegant simplicity of a waltz." (Germany, Kiel, Diabolo 10–1988)

Daniel Chardon writes in Jazz Hot, France: "Mal, who can be identified apart from anything else, by his enchanting abracadabra, who has always been called a great Sorcerer, a master of hallucination and of trance ... who propels, most of all, Jim Pepper out into the light in this ballad! Long live Mal Waldron! Long live Tutu Records! Long live Trance!"

== Track listing ==
All compositions by Mal Waldron except as indicated

1. "Dancing on the Flames" — 9:34
2. "A Bow to the Classics" — 7:59
3. "Little One" — 8:11
4. "From a Little Acorns" — 7:52
5. "Soul Mates" — 8:58
6. "Blood and Guts" — 6:49
7. "Solar" (Miles Davis) — 8:56 Bonus track on CD reissue
8. "Blue Monk" (Thelonious Monk) — 7:35 Bonus track on CD reissue
9. "Golden Golson" — 6:00 Bonus track on CD reissue

- Recorded at Trixi Studios in Munich, West Germany on November 25, 1987

== Personnel ==
Musicians

- Mal Waldron — piano
- Jim Pepper — tenor saxophone (tracks 5, 7, 8 & 9)
- Ed Schuller — bass (tracks 1–4 & 6–9)
- John Betsch — drums (tracks 1–4 & 6–9)

Production

- Peter Wiessmueller – Producer, Photos Booklet
- Willy Schmidt – Recording engineer, analog at Trixi Studios, Munich
- Tonstudio Mahne – Digital Mastering
- Lauren Waldron – Cover Art
- Thomas Fitterling – Liner Notes
