= In Retrospect (Mal Waldron album) =

Studio album by Mal Waldron
- Released: 1982
- Recorded: April 23, 1982
- Genre: Jazz
- Length: 38:09
- Label: Baybridge

Mal Waldron chronology
One Entrance, Many Exits (1982)	In Retrospect (1982)	Breaking New Ground (1983)

In Retrospect is an album by American jazz pianist Mal Waldron recorded in 1982 and originally released by the Japanese Baybridge label.

== Track listing ==
1. "All Alone" (Irving Berlin) – 7:30
2. "Blue Monk" (Thelonious Monk) – 6:13
3. "I Can't Get Started" (Ira Gershwin, Vernon Duke) – 7:36
4. "Oleo" (Sonny Rollins) – 11:14
5. "Straight, No Chaser" (Monk) – 5:36

- Recorded at the Tecichiku Kaikan Studio, in Tokyo, Japan, on April 23, 1982

== Personnel ==
- Mal Waldron — piano
- Akira Miyazawa — tenor saxophone (2–5), flute (1)
- Isao Suzuki — bass
- Hironobu Fujisawa — drums
