= Hard Talk (album) =

Live album by Mal Waldron
- Released: 1974
- Recorded: May 4, 1974
- Genre: Jazz
- Length: 37:48
- Label: Enja
- Producer: Horst Weber

Mal Waldron chronology
Up Popped the Devil (1973)	Hard Talk (1974)	Like Old Time (1976)

Steve Lacy chronology
Scraps (1974)	Hard Talk (1974)	Flakes (1974)

Hard Talk is a live album by American jazz pianist Mal Waldron recorded in 1974 and released by the Enja label.

== Reception ==
The Allmusic review by Scott Yanow awarded the album 4½ stars stating "This is a strong live set that successfully combines together some distinctive musical personalities".

Professional ratings
Review scores
Source	Rating
Allmusic	4.5/5 stars

== Track listing ==
All compositions by Mal Waldron

1. "Snake Out" — 12:28
2. "Hard Talk" — 19:17
3. "Russian Melody" — 6:03
4. "Hurray for Herbie" — 13:29 Bonus track on CD reissue

- Recorded at the East-West Jazz Festival in the Meistersingerhalle in Nürnberg, West Germany on May 4, 1974.

== Personnel ==
- Mal Waldron — piano
- Manfred Schoof — cornet
- Steve Lacy — soprano saxophone
- Isla Eckinger — bass
- Allen Blairman — drums
