= Waldron-Haslam =

Studio album by Mal Waldron & George Haslam
- Released: 1994
- Recorded: February 24, 1994
- Genre: Jazz
- Length: 68:39
- Label: Slam
- Producer: George Haslam

Mal Waldron chronology
My Dear Family (1993)	Waldron-Haslam (1994)	After Hours (1994)

Waldron-Haslam is an album by jazz pianist Mal Waldron and baritone saxophonist George Haslam, recorded in 1994 and released on the English Slam label.

== Reception ==
The AllMusic review by Steve Loewy states: "The two musicians are fully in sync, aside from the few times, particularly on the improvised pieces, where there is a tendency to ramble. Haslam boasts a singularly attractive, thin tone that balances the pianist's dense styling. The commanding improvisations by both Haslam and Waldron straddle the boundaries of free and post-bop jazz in a compellingly charming way."

Professional ratings
Review scores
Source	Rating
AllMusic	4/5 stars
The Penguin Guide to Jazz Recordings	3.5/4 stars

== Track listing ==
All compositions by Mal Waldron and George Haslam except as indicated

1. "I Got It Bad (and That Ain't Good)" (Duke Ellington, Paul Francis Webster) — 8:16
2. "If I Were a Bell" (Frank Loesser) — 8:08
3. "Catch as Catch Should" — 7:09
4. "Somewhere" (Leonard Bernstein, Stephen Sondheim) — 5:41
5. "Variations on Brahms 3, Mvt.3" (Johannes Brahms, Mal Waldron) — 4:49
6. "A Time for Duke" (Waldron) — 7:04
7. "The Vortex" (George Haslam) — 8:45
8. "Motion in Order" — 18:47

- Recorded in Cambridgeshire, England, on February 24, 1994

== Personnel ==
- Mal Waldron — piano
- George Haslam — baritone saxophone
