= Breaking New Ground (Mal Waldron album) =

Studio album by Mal Waldron
- Released: 1983
- Recorded: June 28 & 29, 1983
- Genre: Jazz
- Length: 46:51
- Label: Baybridge (Japan)
- Producer: Jeffrey Kaufman

Mal Waldron chronology
In Retrospect (1982)	Breaking New Ground (1983)	Mal Waldron Plays Eric Satie (1983)

Breaking New Ground is an album by American jazz pianist Mal Waldron recorded in 1983 and released by the Japanese Baybridge label.

== Reception ==
The Allmusic review by Ken Dryden awarded the album 3½ stars stating "Mal Waldron's Breaking New Ground is an abrupt departure for the pianist. Normally focusing on his own compositions, these 1983 trio sessions with Reggie Workman and Ed Blackwell find him mining current pop songs... This CD may startle Waldron's fans a bit, but it proves that he was open to new ideas".

Professional ratings
Review scores
Source	Rating
Allmusic	3.5/5 stars

== Track listing ==
All compositions by Mal Waldron except where noted.

1. "Dans La Cuisine d'Alibi"
2. "Suicide Is Painless" (Mike Altman, Johnny Mandel)
3. "After the Love Has Gone" (David Foster, Jay Graydon, Bill Champlin)
4. "Beat It" (Michael Jackson)
5. "You Are the Sunshine of My Life" (Stevie Wonder)
6. "Gymnopédie No. 2" (Erik Satie)
7. "Everything Must Change" (Bernard Ighner)
8. "Thy Freedom Come"
- Recorded in Tokyo, Japan on June 28 & 29, 1983

== Personnel ==
- Mal Waldron — piano
- Reggie Workman — bass
- Ed Blackwell — drums
