= Our Colline's a Treasure =

Studio album by Mal Waldron
- Released: 1987
- Recorded: April 28 & 30, 1987
- Genre: Jazz
- Length: 42:15
- Label: Soul Note

Mal Waldron chronology
| The Seagulls of Kristiansund (1986) | Our Colline's a Treasure (1987) | Remembering the Moment (1987) |

Our Colline's a Treasure is an album by jazz pianist Mal Waldron recorded in 1987 and released on the Italian Soul Note label.

== Reception ==
The Allmusic review awarded the album 3 stars.

Professional ratings
Review scores
| Source | Rating |
|---|---|
| Allmusic | 3/5 stars |
| The Penguin Guide to Jazz Recordings | 4/4 stars |

== Track listing ==
All compositions by Mal Waldron

1. "Spaces" — 9:18
2. "Our Colline's a Treasure" — 6:20
3. "Ches Pascale" — 5:43
4. "The Git Go" — 13:27
5. "Because of You I Live Again" — 7:27

- Recorded at Barigozzi Studio in Milan, Italy on April 28 & 30, 1987

== Personnel ==
- Mal Waldron — piano
- Leonard Jones — bass
- Sangoma Everett — drums
