= You and the Night and the Music (Mal Waldron album) =

Studio album by Mal Waldron
- Released: 1984
- Recorded: December 9, 1983
- Genre: Jazz
- Label: Paddle Wheel (Japan)
- Producer: Jeffrey Kaufman

Mal Waldron chronology
Mal Waldron Plays Eric Satie (1983)	You and the Night and the Music (1984)	Encounters (1984)

You and the Night and the Music is an album by American jazz pianist Mal Waldron recorded in 1983 and released by the Japanese Paddle Wheel label.

== Reception ==
The Allmusic review by Ron Wynn awarded the album 4 stars, stating: "High-caliber lineup".

Professional ratings
Review scores
Source	Rating
Allmusic	4/5 stars

== Track listing ==
1. "The Way You Look Tonight" (Dorothy Fields, Jerome Kern)
2. "Bags' Groove" (Milt Jackson)
3. "'Round Midnight" (Thelonious Monk)
4. "You and the Night and the Music" (Howard Dietz, Arthur Schwartz)
5. "Georgia on My Mind" (Hoagy Carmichael, Stuart Gorrell)
6. "Billie's Bounce" (Charlie Parker)
7. "Waltz for My Mother" (Mal Waldron)

- Recorded at King Studios in Tokyo, Japan, on December 9, 1983

== Personnel ==
- Mal Waldron — piano
- Reggie Workman — bass
- Ed Blackwell — drums
