= Mal, Verve, Black & Blue =

Live album by Mal Waldron
- Released: 1996
- Recorded: October 11, 1994
- Genre: Jazz
- Label: Tutu

Mal Waldron chronology
After Hours (1994)	Mal, Verve, Black & Blue (1996)	Two New (1995)

Mal, Verve, Black & Blue is a live album by jazz pianist Mal Waldron recorded in 1994 and released on the German Tutu label.

== Track listing ==
All compositions by Mal Waldron except as indicated

1. "Judy Full Grown" — 12:28
2. "Transylvanian Dance" — 16:57
3. "Here Comes Mikey" — 11:39
4. "Soul Eyes" — 10:50
5. "I See You Now" — 13:50
6. "The Last Go Pepper Blues" — 9:06
7. "No Title" — 0:17

- Recorded at the Theatre Satiricon in Essen, Germany on October 11, 1994

== Personnel ==
- Mal Waldron — piano
- Nicolas Simion — tenor saxophone
- Ed Schuller — bass
- Victor Jones — drums
