= The Seagulls of Kristiansund =

Live album by Mal Waldron
- Released: 1987
- Recorded: September 16, 1986
- Genre: Jazz
- Length: 56:03
- Label: Soul Note
- Producer: Giovanni Bonandrini

Mal Waldron chronology
The Git Go - Live at the Village Vanguard (1986)	The Seagulls of Kristiansund (1987)	Our Colline's a Treasure (1987)

The Seagulls of Kristiansund is a live album by jazz pianist Mal Waldron recorded at the Village Vanguard and released on the Italian Soul Note label in 1987.

== Reception ==
The Allmusic review awarded the album 4½ stars.

Professional ratings
Review scores
Source	Rating
Allmusic	4.5/5 stars
The Penguin Guide to Jazz Recordings	4/4 stars

== Track listing ==
All compositions by Mal Waldron

1. "Snake Out" — 17:19
2. "Judy" — 12:42
3. "The Seagulls of Kristiansund" — 26:02

- Recorded at the Village Vanguard in New York City on September 16, 1986

== Personnel ==
- Mal Waldron — piano
- Woody Shaw — trumpet
- Charlie Rouse — tenor saxophone, flute
- Reggie Workman — bass
- Ed Blackwell — drums
