= Up Popped the Devil =

Studio album by Mal Waldron
- Released: 1974
- Recorded: December 28, 1973
- Genre: Jazz
- Length: 47:27
- Label: Enja
- Producer: Horst Weber

Mal Waldron chronology
Meditations (1972)	Up Popped the Devil (1974)	Hard Talk (1974)

Up Popped the Devil is an album by American jazz pianist Mal Waldron, recorded in 1973 and released by the Enja label.

== Reception ==
The AllMusic review by Bob Rusch stated, "Pianist Mal Waldron's music is characterized by a heavily-brooding rhythmic quality, with the left hand usually carrying the theme at one repetitious tempo while the right hammers away in juxtaposition with a counter tempo (usually faster)".

Professional ratings
Review scores
Source	Rating
AllMusic	4.5/5 stars
The Penguin Guide to Jazz Recordings	3/4 stars

== Track listing ==
All compositions by Mal Waldron

1. "Up Popped the Devil" – 10:25
2. "Space Walk" – 12:28
3. "Snake Out" – 11:02
4. "Changachangachanga" – 13:32

- Recorded at Studio WARP in New York City on December 28, 1973.

== Personnel ==
- Mal Waldron – piano
- Carla Poole – flute (track 2)
- Reggie Workman – bass
- Billy Higgins – drums
