= No More Tears (For Lady Day) =

No More Tears (for Lady Day)

Studio album by Mal Waldron
- Released: 1989
- Recorded: November 1, 2 & 3, 1988
- Genre: Jazz
- Length: 58:23
- Label: Timeless
- Producer: Makoto Kimata

Mal Waldron chronology
Art of the Duo (1988)	No More Tears (for Lady Day) (1989)	Crowd Scene (1989)

No More Tears (For Lady Day) is a 1988 album by jazz pianist Mal Waldron recorded in West Germany and released on the Dutch Timeless label.

== Reception ==
The AllMusic review by Steve Loewy awarded the album 4 stars, stating: "The pianist is in a somber mood, perhaps because of the theme, though his performance is up to his usually high standards... The delightful ambience of the trio results in a laid-back atmosphere that soothes and calms. A fine antidote to a stressful world and a lovely tribute to Lady Day."

Professional ratings
Review scores
Source	Rating
AllMusic	4/5 stars

== Track listing ==
All compositions by Mal Waldron except where noted.

1. "Yesterdays" (Otto Harbach, Jerome Kern) – 7:13
2. "No More Tears" – 7:00
3. "Melancholy Waltz" – 5:54
4. "Solitude" (Eddie DeLange, Duke Ellington, Irving Mills) – 6:00
5. "Love Me or Leave Me" (Walter Donaldson, Gus Kahn) – 5:52
6. "All Night Through" – 6:36
7. "As Time Goes By" (Herman Hupfeld) – 7:03
8. "Smoke Gets in Your Eyes" (Otto Harbach, Jerome Kern) – 3:51
9. "Alone Together" (Howard Dietz, Arthur Schwartz) – 8:44
- Recorded in Munich, West Germany on November 1, 2 & 3, 1988

== Personnel ==
- Mal Waldron – piano
- Paulo Cardoso – bass
- John Betsch – drums
