= Crowd Scene =

Studio album by Mal Waldron
- Released: 1989
- Recorded: June 10, 1989
- Genre: Jazz
- Length: 52:16
- Label: Soul Note
- Producer: Giovanni Bonandrini

Mal Waldron chronology
No More Tears (For Lady Day) (1988)	Crowd Scene (1989)	Where Are You? (1989)

Crowd Scene is an album by jazz pianist Mal Waldron, recorded in 1989 and released on the Italian Soul Note label.

== Reception ==
The AllMusic review by Scott Yanow stated that "there are some rambling moments on these lengthy performances, both of which clock in at over 25 minutes. Still, it is often fascinating to hear what the musicians come up with during these go-for-broke improvisations".

Professional ratings
Review scores
Source	Rating
AllMusic	4/5 stars
The Penguin Guide to Jazz Recordings	4/4 stars

== Track listing ==
All compositions by Mal Waldron

1. "Crowd Scene" — 26:50
2. "Yin and Yang" — 25:26
  - Recorded in New York City on June 10, 1989

== Personnel ==
- Mal Waldron — piano
- Sonny Fortune — alto saxophone
- Ricky Ford — tenor saxophone
- Reggie Workman — bass
- Eddie Moore — drums
