= Journey Without End =

Studio album by Mal Waldron & Steve Lacy
- Released: 1972
- Recorded: November 30, 1971
- Genre: Jazz
- Length: 45:31
- Label: RCA Victor (Japan)

Mal Waldron chronology
Signals (1971)	Journey Without End (1972)	Blues for Lady Day (1972)

Steve Lacy chronology
Lapis (1971)	Journey Without End (1971)	Mal Waldron with the Steve Lacy Quintet (1972)

Journey Without End is an album by American jazz pianist Mal Waldron and soprano saxophonist Steve Lacy recorded in Paris in 1971 and released on the Japanese RCA Victor label. The album was the first of many recorded collaborations between the two musicians

== Track listing ==
All compositions by Mal Waldron except as indicated

1. "The Fire Now — 9:05
2. "Journey Without End" — 12:30
3. "I Feel a Draft" (Steve Lacy) — 7:54
4. "Bone" (Lacy) — 6:50
5. "Mar" (Lacy) — 9:15

- Recorded at Studios Europa Sonor in Paris, France, on November 30, 1971.

== Personnel ==
- Mal Waldron — piano
- Steve Lacy — soprano saxophone
- Kent Carter — bass
- Noel McGhie — drums
