= Evidence (Mal Waldron album) =

Studio album by Mal Waldron
- Released: 1991
- Recorded: March 14, 1988
- Genre: Jazz
- Length: 58:40
- Label: Dark Light Music
- Producer: Bill Airey Smith

Mal Waldron chronology
Mal, Dance and Soul (1987)	Evidence (1991)	Art of the Duo (1988)

Evidence is a solo album by American jazz pianist Mal Waldron recorded in Canada and released on the Canadian Dark Light Music label.

== Reception ==
The Allmusic review by Ken Dryden awarded the album 4 stars, stating: "The pianist's interpretations of standards on this date are among the best of his career."

Professional ratings
Review scores
Source	Rating
Allmusic	4/5 stars

== Track listing ==
All compositions by Mal Waldron except where noted.

1. "Yesterdays" (Otto Harbach, Jerome Kern) — 8:09
2. "No Kick" — 7:54
3. "Dear Old Stockholm" (Traditional) — 5:50
4. "Rhapsodic Interlude #1" — 8:55
5. "Evidence" (Thelonious Monk) — 3:48
6. "Let's Call This" (Monk) — 4:07
7. "Rhapsodic Interlude #2" — 14:42
8. "How Long Has This Been Going On?" (George Gershwin, Ira Gershwin) — 5:15
  - Recorded in Toronto, Canada, on March 14, 1988

== Personnel ==
- Mal Waldron – piano
