= Uli Lenz =

German jazz composer and pianist (born 1955)

- Born: March 10, 1955 (age 71); Frankfurt, West Germany
- Genres: Jazz
- Occupation: Musician
- Instrument: Piano
- Years active: 1980–present
- Labels: Tutu, Arkadia Jazz, HGBS
- Website: ulilenz.wordpress.com

Uli Lenz (born March 10, 1955) is a German jazz composer, pianist, and music producer.

== Background ==
Born in Frankfurt am Main, he began taking piano lessons at the age of four. In the seventies he studied music composition for classical Piano and Cello at Dr. Hoch's Konservatorium in Frankfurt/Main and played jazz at bars at night while completing his university degree during the day.

In the '80s Lenz toured through France, Spain, Italy and Israel as accompanist of well known saxophonists. In Berlin he took in the club scene and performed solo at the JazzFest Berlin in 1986. Also in 1986, he toured Eastern Europe and the Mediterranean as solo pianist. In 1987, he took in the New Yorker club scene. In 1988, Lenz recorded Live at Sweet Basil with bassist Cecil McBee and drummer Joe Chambers. In 1989, he performed at the Montreux Jazz Festival with bassist Guenter Lenz and drummer Allen Blairman.

In the '90s, Lenz worked with Steve Grossman and Abbey Lincoln. He spent the '90s as a mainstay on the festival circuit, playing numerous gigs all over the world. He also recorded with a variety of collaborators: saxophonist Johannes Barthelmes (1992's Konzert der Verlorenen Söhne and 1993's Trane's Tree), vocalist Patricia Nomakosazana Dhlamini (1993's Trouble in Paradise), and bassist Ed Schuller and drummer Victor Jones (1997's Echoes of Mandela), as well as solo (1995's Love Channel). In 1997, Lenz formed a trio featuring bassist Pepe Berns and drummer Thomas Alkier. Lenz's 2001 album "Rainmaker's Dream" featured bassist Ira Coleman, drummer Horacio "El Negro" Hernandez and saxophonist TK Blue.

Lenz has recorded duets with Nomakosazana and trio jazz with Ed Schuller and John Betsch. In 2005 he worked and recorded duets with French saxophonist François Jeanneau. With duo partner Jeanneau he toured numerous countries including India and Pakistan. In 2010 performed and recorded a duo with bassist Ed Schuller. He also formerly toured on behalf of the German Auswaertige Amt, the German Goethe Institut and the French Alliance Française.

In 2007, Lenz founded the 105 Lenz-Kubach-Johnson Jazz Trio with bassist Gerhard Kubach and drummer Zam Johnson. Since 2013 Uli Lenz has worked primarily with the 105 LKJ, and in November of that year, the three musicians traveled to Africa on behalf of the Foreign Offices of Libya and Germany. In the Red Castle, the landmark of Tripoli, they gave an internationally acclaimed concert. The trio was the first foreign group to play in Libya for over forty years. In 2013, a record deal was secured with HGBS for the 105 LKJ. In its worldwide release in 2014, their first album, "Thinking About You" received enthusiastic applause. Lenz's press agent is Red Haircrow.

== Discography ==
Year recorded	Title	Label	Notes
1986?	Midnight Candy	Enja	
1988	Live at Sweet Basil	Enja	Trio, with Cecil McBee (bass), Joe Chambers (drums); in concert
1991?	Life at the Montreux Music Festival	B&W	with Günter Lenz (bass), Allen Blairman (drums)
1992	Konzert der verlorenen Söhne	Konnex	Duo, with Johannes Barthelmes (tenor sax, soprano sax); in concert
1993?	Trane's Tree	Konnex	with Johannes Barthelmes (tenor sax)
1993?	Trouble in Paradise	Tutu	with Nomakosazana (vocals)
1995?	Love Channel	Bellaphon	
1997?	Echoes of Mandela	Tutu	with Ed Schuller (bass), Victor Jones (drums)
2000	Rainmaker's Dance	Arkadia Jazz	Most tracks trio, with Ira Coleman (bass), Horatio "El Negro" Hernandez (drums); three tracks quartet, with T. K. Blue (alto sax) added
2004?	Tenderness – The Art of the Duo	Tutu	with Nomakosazana (vocals)
2007?	Good-bye Venus	Tutu	with Ed Schuller (bass), John Betsch (drums)
2008?	Walking in the Wind	Tutu	with François Jeanneau
2011?	Is there a life after Bradley's?	Tutu	with Ed Schuller (bass)
2011?	Une Fille pop	Vila Mariana	with Emmanuel Tugny and the Lady Guaiba's Swing Band
2014?	Dance Manaña	HGBS	
2014?	Thinking about You	HGBS (Fenn Music)	Trio, with Kubi Kubach (bass), Zam Johnson (drums)
2015?	Art of Duo - Les Danses de Vulcain	Tutu	with François Jeanneau

== Interviews and articles ==
- Hochkarätige, kleine Band – mit guten Vibrationen at Gießener Anzeiger Newspaper (July 16, 2014).
- Libyans and Germans hit high notes of Freedom at Libya Herald (October 8, 2013).
- An Evening of Dazzling Jazz at Hyderabad Western Music Foundation (July 10, 2010).
- Is There a Life After Bradley's? at Jazz Thing Review (2010).
- Der Jazz Ist Nicht Tot Interview at Nachrichten.Net (2009).
- Uli Lenz Biography at Art Planeta (2009).
- Wenn der Flügel die Stücke auswählt Interview at DeutschlandRadio Kultur (December 2014).
- Duett zweier Jazzgrößen: Uli Lenz’ neues Soloalbum At Jazz Zeitung (January 2015).
- Dance Mañana! Uli Lenz RONDO, Klassik & Jazz Magazine (January 2015).
- Uli Lenz Jazz Podium (March 2015).

== Songbooks ==
- M. Kunzler Jazzlexikon Bd. 1 Reinbek 2002
