= Encounters (album) =

Studio album by Mal Waldron & David Friesen
- Released: 1985
- Recorded: March 18, 1984
- Genre: Jazz
- Label: Muse

Mal Waldron chronology
You and the Night and the Music (1983)	Encounters (1985)	Mal Waldron and Alone (1985)

Encounters is an album by American jazz pianist Mal Waldron and bassist David Friesen recorded in 1984 and released by the Muse label.

== Reception ==
The Allmusic review by Ken Dryden awarded the album 4 stars stating "Longtime fans of Mal Waldron will find his duo session with bassist David Friesen to be of a very different character. The pianist's solo and trio recordings are typically intense, very moody performances, but his touch is much lighter".

Professional ratings
Review scores
Source	Rating
Allmusic	4/5 stars

== Track listing ==
1. "If I Were A Bell" (Frank Loesser)
2. "Encounters" (Mal Waldron, David Friesen)
3. "My Toby" (Friesen)
4. "Night Wind" (Waldron, Friesen)
5. "Imagination" (Jimmy Van Heusen, Johnny Burke)
6. "Outside Inside Too" (Waldron)
  - Recorded in New York City on March 18, 1984

== Personnel ==
- Mal Waldron — piano (tracks 1, 2 & 4–6)
- David Friesen — bass (tracks 1–3 & 5), shakuhachi (track 4)
