= Mal Waldron Plays the Blues =

Live album by Mal Waldron
- Released: 1971
- Recorded: June 29, 1971
- Genre: Jazz
- Length: 44:05
- Label: Enja
- Producer: Horst Weber

Mal Waldron chronology
Black Glory (1971)	Mal Waldron Plays the Blues (1971)	Signals (1971)

Mal Waldron Plays the Blues is a live album by American jazz pianist Mal Waldron recorded in Munich in 1971 and released on the Enja label.

== Reception ==
The AllMusic review by Scott Yanow awarded the album 3 stars stating "The three Waldron and two Woode compositions generally have their own personalities (although none became standards) and serve as excellent showcases for Waldron's repetitive and percussive style. A fine effort".

Professional ratings
Review scores
Source	Rating
AllMusic	3/5 stars

== Track listing ==
All compositions by Mal Waldron except as indicated

1. Announcement – 1:30
2. "Blues For F.P." – 11:23
3. "Way In" – 9:18
4. Announcement – 1:12
5. "Miles and Miles of Blues" – 5:32
6. "Up Down Blues" (Jimmy Woode) – 6:03
7. "Blues For D.S." (Woode) – 9:07

- Recorded at the Domicile in Munich, West Germany on June 29, 1971.

== Personnel ==
- Mal Waldron – piano
- Jimmy Woode – bass
- Pierre Favre – drums
