= Mal Waldron on Steinway =

Studio album by Mal Waldron
- Released: 1973
- Recorded: May 11, 1972
- Genre: Jazz
- Length: 38:57
- Label: Teichiku

Mal Waldron chronology
A Touch of the Blues (1972)	Mal Waldron on Steinway (1973)	Mal Waldron with the Steve Lacy Quintet (1972)

Professional ratings
Review scores
Source	Rating
Allmusic	3.5/5 stars

Mal Waldron on Steinway is an album by American jazz pianist Mal Waldron featuring solo performances recorded in Paris in 1972 and released on the Japanese Teichiku label.

== Reception ==
The Allmusic review by Thom Jurek awarded the album 3½ stars, stating: "The pieces here are not Waldron's most adventurous, but that's just fine, because what's on offer is delightful... this is a fine and curious date; it showcases the pianist using the Steinway as a compositional element in his tunes and puts a different side of his mercurial musical personality on display."

== Track listing ==
1. "Portrait of a Bullfighter" – 7:26
2. "One for Bud" – 6:19
3. "For Erik Satie" – 6:34
4. "Paris Reunited" – 18:38

All compositions by Mal Waldron.

Recorded in Paris, France, on May 11, 1972.

== Personnel ==
- Mal Waldron – piano
