= First Encounter =

Studio album by Mal Waldron and Gary Peacock
- Released: 1971
- Recorded: March 8, 1971; Tokyo, Japan
- Genre: Jazz
- Length: 46:19
- Label: RCA Victor

Mal Waldron chronology
| Mal: Live 4 to 1 (1971) | First Encounter (1971) | Number Nineteen (1971) |

First Encounter is an album by American jazz pianist Mal Waldron and bassist Gary Peacock recorded in 1971 and released on the Japanese RCA Victor label.

== Reception ==
The Allmusic review by Scott Yanow awarded the album 3 stars stating "The long improvisations on the four originals (three by Waldron and one from Peacock) are melancholy, usually introverted and subtle. The interplay between Waldron and Peacock on the inside/outside music is the main asset to this obscure but generally rewarding session".

Professional ratings
Review scores
| Source | Rating |
|---|---|
| Allmusic | 3/5 stars |

== Track listing ==
All compositions by Mal Waldron except where noted.

1. "She Walks In Beauty" — 12:18
2. "The Heart Of The Matter" — 11:56
3. "What's That" (Gary Peacock) — 9:05
4. "Walking Way" — 13:00

== Personnel ==
- Mal Waldron — piano
- Gary Peacock — bass
- Hiroshi Murakami — drums
