= George Haslam =

British musician

George Haslam (born 22 February 1939, Preston, Lancashire) is an English avant-garde jazz saxophonist. Haslam's horns of choice are the baritone saxophone and the tárogató. Voted in the top twenty All Time World Greatest Baritone Saxists in Japanese Encyclopaedia of Jazz.

Haslam performed in the free improvisational scene around London from the late 1960s, but did not begin recording until the 1980s. His first recording was issued in 1984, having been recorded while on tour in Hungary. His ensemble, called the Siger Band, included Paul Rutherford, Pete McPhail, Tony Moore, and Nigel Morris. He played in Mexico in 1986 and in Cuba soon after; his was the first British jazz ensemble to play in the latter country. He won the same distinction in Argentina before the end of the decade, and has returned repeatedly to this country to perform and record. He founded Slam Records in 1989 to issue his own music; the label also releases material by Steve Lacy and Mal Waldron, among others. During this time his collaborations included work with Lol Coxhill, Paul Hession, Laszlo Gardony, Ruben Ferrero, and Evan Parker.

Haslam founded the British Saxophone Quartet in 1992, with Paul Dunmall, Elton Dean, and Simon Picard rounding out the membership. He also founded an ensemble called Meltdown in 1997, which issued its first record in 2001.

== Discography ==
=== As leader ===
- Live in Hungary with Siger Band (Spotlite, 1984)
- The Healing with Siger Band (Spotlite, 1986)
- Level Two (Slam, 1993)
- Argentine Adventures: In Jazz, Ethnic and Improvised Musics (Slam, 1994)
- Argentine Adventures Part 2: Tango, Blues and Freedom (Slam, 1996)
- Solos East West (Slam, 1997)
- 1989 and All That (Slam, 1989)
- Communications (Slam, 1998)
- Duos East West (Slam, 1998)
- Harmonance (Slam, 1999)
- Argentine Adventures Part 3: Travels with My Tarogato (Slam, 1999)
- Live at the Red Rose with Anglo-Argentine Jazz Quartet (Slam, 2001)
- Meltdown (Slam, 2001)
- Soaring with Plaza Jazz Trio (Slam, 2002)
- Pendle Hawk Carapace (Slam, 2002)
- Latin from the North with Latin from the North (Slam, 2003)
- The Mahout (Slam, 2004)
- Cool Moon with Anglo-Kuopio Quartet (Slam, 2004)
- SHaK (Slam, 2006)
- Cuban Meltdown (Slam, 2007)
- Helios Suite (Slam, 2007)
- Holywell Session: Live in Oxford (Slam, 2007)
- September Spring (Slam, 2007)
- From Whichford Hill (Slam, 2008)
- Papermoon (Slam, 2008)
- Once Upon a Time in Argentina (Slam, 2010)
- Words Unspoken (Slam, 2013)
- Suite of Dreams with OxJaMS Trio (Slam, 2015)
- Maresia (Slam, 2016)
- Lethe (Slam, 2019)
- Ajuda (Slam, 2020)

=== As sideman ===
- Lol Coxhill, Termite One (Bruce's Fingers, 1990)
- Lol Coxhill, The Holywell Concert (Slam, 1990)
- Evan Parker, Parker/Haslam/Edwards (Slam, 2001)
- Paul Rutherford, Raahe '99 (Slam, 2012)
- Mal Waldron, Two New (Slam, 1995)
- Mal Waldron, Waldron-Haslam (Slam, 1994)
