= Michael Hornstein =

Michael Hornstein (born 1962) is a Munich-based saxophonist, composer and music producer.

== Biography ==
Hornstein was born of a German father and an Italian mother in 1962. He started playing the piano at the age of 10 and later saxophone at the age of 14. Michael Hornstein began as a self-taught musician under the influence of listening to Charlie Parker. He studied music at the university for music and interpretative arts in Graz from 1979 to 1982. In 1983 he received a scholarship to study at the Berklee College of Music.

He has collaborated with musicians like Sunny Murray, Al Porcino, Albert Mangelsdorff, Udo Lindenberg, Hector Martignon, Blank & Jones, Bob Dorough, Fred Braceful, Gary Peacock and Billy Hart, Sandra Kaye, Joe Bonner, Joe Madrid among many others. In his recorded works one finds flavours of jazz, drum and bass, trip hop, electronic music as well as a series of commissions for silent movies, shortcuts and artvideos.

He has participated in festivals and productions all over the world, as well in collaboration with the Goethe Institutes: Georgia, Serbia, Bosnia, Spain, Mexico, Cuba, USA, Colombia, Greece, Italy, China, etc. His longer stays abroad from Germany include time in New York, Sevilla, Bogotá.

He worked as a professor at the University Javeriana in Colombia in 2003. Since 2004 he works as well as a producer for international folklore in countries like: Colombia, Panama, Guatemala, Costa Rica, Venezuela, El Salvador, Belize, Honduras, Nicaragua, Dominican Republic, Haiti, Trinidad And Tobago, Mongolia, Tibet, Jamaica and in 2008 with members of the Buena Vista Social Club in Cuba. He is featured on the compilation Cafe Del Mar Vol.14 with the track Carma and on Cafe Del Mar Vol.17 with the track Boom Boom.

== Discography ==
- Langsames Blau, Enja, 1993
- Dry Red, with Roberto Di Gioia, 1994
- Innocent Green, with Gary Peacock, Billy Hart, Roberto Di Gioia, Enja 1996
- Danza Mestiza, Millennium, Colombia, 2003
- Draught, Leo records, London, 2005
- Westend, CSM, Austria, 2006
- Let It Go, Spice records, 2006
- Carma, Cafe del Mar Vol. XIV, 2007
- Summertime Opium, Spice Records, 2009
- Boom Boom, Cafe del Mar Vol. XVII, 2011
- Lounge Jazz, Sonoton, 2012
- But For Now, with Bob Dorough and Tony Marino), Enja, 2015
- Saxhouse, Sonoton, 2015
- Playgrounds, with Roberto Di Gioia, 2017
- Ellington Now, with Oliver Hahn, 2019
- Reflective Spaces, Sonoton, 2022
- Conversations Now, with Oliver Hahn, 2023
- Modern Art, with Roberto Di Gioia, Sonoton, 2026
