= Jazz a Confronto 19 =

Studio album by Mal Waldron
- Released: April 1, 1972
- Genre: Jazz
- Length: 37:35
- Label: Horo
- Producer: Aldo Sinesio

Mal Waldron chronology
A Little Bit of Miles (1972)	Jazz a Confronto 19 (1972)	A Touch of the Blues (1972)

Jazz a Confronto 19 is a solo album by American jazz pianist Mal Waldron recorded in Rome, Italy, on April 1, 1972, and released on the Horo label as part of the "Jazz a Confronto" series.

== Track listing ==
All compositions by Mal Waldron except as indicated

1. "Tew Nune" — 4:36
2. "Picchy's Waltz" — 7:22
3. "Breakin' Through" — 6:50
4. "Canto Ritrovato" (Giorgio Gaslini) — 5:22
5. "Lullaby" — 4:19
6. "Appia Antica" — 9:13

- Recorded at Titania Studios in Rome, Italy on April 1, 1972

== Personnel ==
- Mal Waldron – piano
