= Signals (Mal Waldron album) =

Studio album by Mal Waldron
- Released: 1971
- Recorded: August 14, 1971
- Genre: Jazz
- Length: 35:23
- Label: Freedom
- Producer: Alan Bates

Mal Waldron chronology
Mal Waldron Plays the Blues (1971)	Signals (1971)	Journey Without End (1971)

Signals is an album by American jazz pianist Mal Waldron featuring solo performances recorded in Baarn, Holland in 1971 and released on the Freedom label.

== Reception ==
The Allmusic review by Scott Yanow awarded the album 4 stars stating "this set features a solo outing by Waldron that fully displays his continually evolving style. He had moved away from his earlier Thelonious Monk influence to an extent and developed his own brooding style which made expert use of repetition. Waldron's four originals give him plenty of opportunity to stretch out".

Professional ratings
Review scores
Source	Rating
Allmusic	4/5 stars

== Track listing ==
All compositions by Mal Waldron

1. "Signals" — 7:38
2. "Things That Go Bump in the Night" — 8:35
3. "Zapata" — 10:30
4. "A Touch of the Blues" — 8:40

- Recorded in Baarn, Holland on August 14, 1971.

== Personnel ==
- Mal Waldron – piano
