= Allen Blairman =

American jazz drummer (1940–2022)

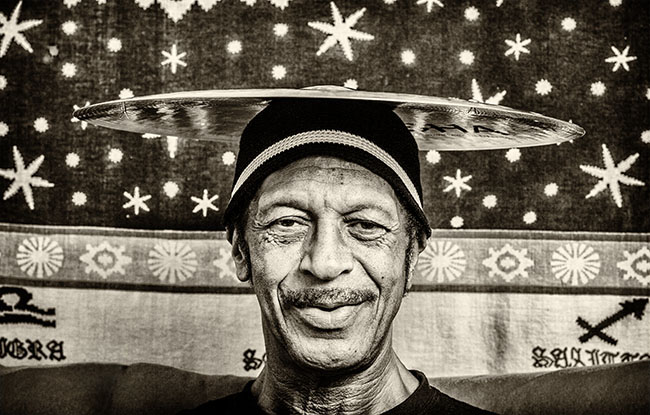
- Born: August 13, 1940; Pittsburgh, Pennsylvania, U.S.
- Died: April 29, 2022 (aged 81); Heidelberg, Germany

Allen Blairman (August 13, 1940 – April 29, 2022) was an American jazz drummer best known for his performing and recording with Albert Ayler and Mal Waldron.

== Career ==
Blairman was born in Pittsburgh, Pennsylvania on August 13, 1940. As an eighteen-year-old, he performed with the Charles Bell Contemporary Jazz Quartet at Pittsburgh's Carnegie Lecture Hall in January 1959. In May 1960, he received the Outstanding Musician award and a scholarship to the Berklee College of Music in Boston, Massachusetts during the Intercollegiate Jazz Festival at Georgetown University in Georgetown for his performance with the Charles Bell Contemporary Jazz Quartet, which was recognized for its first place finish with the award of a recording contract with Columbia Records, a contract with the Associated Artist booking agency, a two-week engagement opportunity at the Birdland jazz club in New York City, and an additional opportunity to appear at the Newport Jazz Festival in Rhode Island. Still performing with that quartet in 1961, his drumming was captured on the ensemble's seven-selection record in April of that year.

By 1964, he was performing in Manhattan with the Wendell Byrd Trio. In 1968, he moved from Pittsburgh to New York, where he worked with Charles Mingus, Chet Baker and Archie Shepp.

In 1970, he performed with Albert Ayler at the Fondation Maeght in France. Two years later, he toured throughout Europe with Karl Berger. By 1976, he was performing with a German Jazz rock group called Embryo. The next year, Blairman recorded with Mal Waldron, former accompanist for the late Billie Holiday, on Waldron's 1977 album, "Hard Talk"; he then later recorded again with Waldron for Enja, as well as with Albert Mangelsdorff.

While in France, he collaborated with Bireli Lagrene. In 1991 he recorded "Life at the Montreux Music Festival" in trio-formation with Günter Lenz and Uli Lenz.

In addition, he performed with saxophonist Olaf Schönborn and bassist Mario Fadani for twenty years in the jazz ensemble, "Trio Variety," and, beginning in 2009, with tap dancer Kurt Albert and Olaf Schönborn in the jazz formation, "Melody Rhythm & Tap."

== Death ==
Blairman died on April 29, 2022, in Heidelberg, Germany. He had been diagnosed with cancer in January.

== Discography ==
- Blue and Sentimental - 2017 with Olaf Schoenborn
- Nuits de la Fondation Maeght - 1970 with Albert Ayler
- Spontaneous - 1971 with Albert Mangelsdorff and Masahiko Sato
- Live on the Riviera - 1971 with A. Ayler
- Holy Ghost with A. Ayler (only CD 7 (4 tracks))
- With Silence - 1972 with Karl Berger
- We are You - 1972 with Karl Berger
- A Touch of the Blues - 1972 (Enja) with Mal Waldron
- Hard Talk - 1974 (Enja) with Mal Waldron
- Swing 81 - 1981 with Bireli Lagrene
- Four for Jazz (Casino Rec.) - 2000
- Like Back in the Days - 2005
- FourTet (Beatonal Studio) - 2005
