= Meditations (Mal Waldron album) =

Live album by Mal Waldron
- Released: 1972
- Recorded: 12 July 1972
- Venue: Dug, Tokyo
- Genre: Jazz
- Length: 45:05
- Label: RCA Victor
- Producer: Tetsuya Shimoda

Mal Waldron chronology
The Whirling Dervish (1972)	Meditations (1972)	Up Popped the Devil (1973)

Meditations – Live at Dug is a 1972 live album recorded by American jazz pianist Mal Waldron. This is his solo album recorded live in the jazz club Dug in the Shinjuku district of Tokyo. The record was re-released in 2016 on CD.

== Reception ==
A reviewer of Dusty Groove stated "A sublime solo performance from Mal Waldron – the kind of unbridled, spiritual work he started giving us once he spent a lot of time overseas – sounds that are light years away from his American records of just a few short years before! Waldron is incredible here – and his ability to work in different ways with each hand on the piano almost makes it feel as if the performance is a duet, instead of a solo – as Mal can lay down modal rhythms with one hand, create incredible flights on the keys with the other – all while holding onto a sense of rhythm and melody that's completely wonderful throughout. Unlike some other Waldron records of this nature, which might go a bit outside – this one is free, but never "out" – and instead has Mal opening up beautifully on the titles "The Blues Suite", "Chairo No Hitomi", "The Stone Garden Of Ryoanji", "Summertime", "All Alone", and "Left Alone"."

== Track listing ==
No.	Title	Writer(s)	Length
1.	"All Alone"	Waldron	5:09
2.	"The Blues Suite"	Waldron	17:05
3.	"Chairo No Hitomi"	Waldron	4:59
4.	"The Stone Garden of Ryoanji"	Waldron	8:16
5.	"Summertime"	George Gershwin	4:43
6.	"Left Alone"	Waldron	4:53
Total length:			45:05

== Personnel ==
- Mal Waldron – piano
- Keijiro Kubota – design
- Takashi Watanabe – recording mixer
- Takashi Arihara – photographer
- Tetsuya Shimoda – producer
