= One Entrance, Many Exits =

Studio album by Mal Waldron
- Released: 1983
- Recorded: January 4, 1982
- Genre: Jazz
- Length: 49:04
- Label: Palo Alto
- Producer: Herb Wong

Mal Waldron chronology
What It Is (1981)	One Entrance, Many Exits (1983)	In Retrospect (1982)

One Entrance, Many Exits is an album by American jazz pianist Mal Waldron recorded in 1982 and released by the Palo Alto label.

== Reception ==
In the Allmusic review by Scott Yanow, he stated: "the combination of musicians works quite well. Pianist Mal Waldron has an inside/outside post bop style that matches perfectly with tenor-saxophonist Joe Henderson, bassist David Friesen and drummer Billy Higgins."

Professional ratings
Review scores
Source	Rating
Allmusic	4.5/5 stars

== Track listing ==
All compositions by Mal Waldron, except as indicated

1. "Golden Golson" — 8:33
2. "One Entrance, Many Exits" — 10:30
3. "Chazz Jazz" — 5:31
4. "Herbal Syndrome" — 6:19
5. "How Deep Is the Ocean?" (Irving Berlin) — 4:43
6. "Blues in 4 by 3" — 7:29

- Recorded in Menlo Park, California, on January 4, 1982

== Personnel ==
- Mal Waldron — piano
- Joe Henderson — tenor saxophone (tracks 1, 4–5)
- David Friesen — bass
- Billy Higgins — drums (tracks 1, 4–6)
