= A Little Bit of Miles =

Live album by Mal Waldron
- Released: 1974
- Recorded: February 9, 1972
- Genre: Jazz
- Length: 35:58
- Label: Freedom
- Producer: Alan Bates

Mal Waldron chronology
Blues for Lady Day (1972)	A Little Bit of Miles (1974)	Jazz a Confronto 19 (1972)

A Little Bit of Miles is a live album by American jazz pianist Mal Waldron, featuring performances recorded in Leiden, Holland, in 1972 and released on the Freedom label. The album was rereleased on CD on Black Lion Records in 1994 as bonus tracks on Blues for Lady Day.

== Reception ==
The AllMusic review by Ken Dryden stated, "Mal Waldron is known for his dark, turbulent original compositions and this live trio engagement is no exception."

Professional ratings
Review scores
Source	Rating
AllMusic	4/5 stars
Tom Hull	B+

== Track listing ==
All compositions by Mal Waldron

1. "A.L.B.O.M. (A Little Bit of Miles)" — 18:09
2. "Here, There and Everywhere" — 17:49
  - Recorded at the Jazzzolder Hot House in Leiden, Holland, on February 9, 1972

== Personnel ==
- Mal Waldron — piano
- Henk Haverhoek — bass
- Pierre Courbois — drums
