= After Hours (Jeanne Lee and Mal Waldron album) =

Studio album by Jeanne Lee & Mal Waldron
- Released: 1994
- Recorded: May 25 and 26, 1994
- Genre: Jazz
- Length: 41:52
- Label: Owl

Mal Waldron chronology
Waldron-Haslam (1994)	After Hours (1994)	Mal, Verve, Black & Blue (1994)

After Hours is an album by jazz singer Jeanne Lee and pianist Mal Waldron, recorded in 1994 and released on the Owl label. The album was released in the US on Sunnyside Records in 2003.

== Reception ==
The AllMusic review by Scott Yanow stated: "Waldron's accompaniment is typically rhythmic, creatively repetitive, brooding and personal. However it is Lee's haunting and highly expressive voice that really sticks in one's memory". The Penguin Guide to Jazz described the album as "a standards session on which Lee does little more than sing the songs".

Professional ratings
Review scores
Source	Rating
AllMusic	4/5 stars
The Penguin Guide to Jazz	3/4 stars

== Track listing ==
All compositions by Mal Waldron except as indicated

1. "Caravan" (Duke Ellington, Irving Mills, Juan Tizol) – 7:28
2. "You Go to My Head" (J. Fred Coots, Haven Gillespie) – 7:07
3. "I Could Write a Book" (Lorenz Hart, Richard Rodgers) – 4:03
4. "Goodbye Pork Pie Hat" (Charles Mingus) – 3:24
5. "Straight Ahead" (Abbey Lincoln, Mal Waldron) – 3:17
6. "Fire Waltz" – 7:21
7. "I Let a Song Go Out of My Heart" (Ellington, Mills) – 4:30
8. "Ev'ry Time We Say Goodbye" (Cole Porter) – 5:10
  - Recorded in New York City on May 25 and 26, 1994

== Personnel ==
- Jeanne Lee – vocals
- Mal Waldron – piano
