= The Git Go – Live at the Village Vanguard =

The Git Go - Live at the Village Vanguard

Live album by Mal Waldron
- Released: 1987
- Recorded: September 16, 1986
- Genre: Jazz
- Length: 45:50
- Label: Soul Note
- Producer: Giovanni Bonandrini

Mal Waldron chronology
Left Alone '86 (1986)	The Git Go - Live at the Village Vanguard (1987)	The Seagulls of Kristiansund (1986)

The Git Go – Live at the Village Vanguard is a live album by jazz pianist Mal Waldron, recorded at the Village Vanguard and released on the Italian Soul Note label in 1987.

== Reception ==
The AllMusic review by Scott Yanow stated that "this advanced set has the feel of a high-quality jam session".

Professional ratings
Review scores
Source	Rating
AllMusic	4/5 stars
The Penguin Guide to Jazz Recordings	3.5/4 stars

== Track listing ==
All compositions by Mal Waldron

1. "Status Seeking" — 20:19
2. "The Git Go" — 25:31

- Recorded at the Village Vanguard in New York City on September 16, 1986

== Personnel ==
- Mal Waldron — piano
- Woody Shaw — trumpet
- Charlie Rouse — tenor saxophone, flute
- Reggie Workman — bass
- Ed Blackwell — drums
