= Mal: Live 4 to 1 =

Mal: live 4 to 1

Live album by Mal Waldron
- Released: 1971
- Recorded: November 19, 1970
- Genre: Jazz
- Label: Philips (Japan); West 54 Records (US)

Mal Waldron chronology
The Call (1971)	Mal: live 4 to 1 (1971)	First Encounter (1971)

Mal: Live 4 to 1 is a live album by American jazz pianist Mal Waldron featuring a performance recorded in Tokyo, Japan in 1971 and released on the Japanese Philips label. West 54 Records reissued the album on LP in 1980 as Left Alone - Mal Waldron Live.

== Track listing ==
All compositions by Mal Waldron except as indicated

1. "Little Abbi"
2. "Blood And Guts"
3. "Willow Weep for Me" (Ann Ronell)
4. "You Don't Know What Love Is" (Don Raye, Gene de Paul)
5. "Don't Explain" (Billie Holiday, Arthur Herzog Jr.)
6. "Left Alone" (Billie Holiday, Mal Waldron)
7. "Straight, No Chaser" (Thelonious Monk)
8. "Right On"
9. "Thoughts"
10. "Yesterdays" (Jerome Kern, Otto Harbach)
11. "All Alone" (Irving Berlin)

- Recorded at the Swing Journal Jazz Workshop at Yamaha Hall in Tokyo, Japan on March 2 (tracks 1–5) and March 3 (tracks 6–11), 1971.

== Personnel ==
- Mal Waldron — piano
- Kohsuke Mine — alto saxophone (tracks 6 & 7)
- Masabumi Kikuchi — piano (tracks 1 & 2)
- Isao Suzuki — bass (tracks 6–9)
- Yoshiyuki Nakamura — drums (tracks 6–9)
