= Exmagma =

German experimental rock group

- Origin: Stuttgart, Baden-Württemberg, Germany
- Genres: Experimental rock, krautrock, jazz fusion, jazz-rock, avant-prog, progressive rock, psychedelic rock, free improvisation
- Years active: 1973–1975
- Labels: Neusi, Daily, Long Hair Music, Urus
- Past members: Andy Goldner; Thomas Balluff; Fred Braceful

Exmagma are a three-piece German experimental jazz-rock and krautrock band who released two albums in the early 1970s. They were formed in Stuttgart by Thomas Balluff, Andy Goldner, and Fred Braceful, who was a former member of jazz group Et Cetera. The first two albums Exmagma and Goldball were released in 1973 and 1974 respectively, while Exmagma 3 from 1975 was released in 2006. The band were included on the Nurse With Wound list.

== Members ==
- Andy Goldner (guitars, bass, sax, vocals)
- Thomas Balluff (keyboards, trumpet, flute, vocals)
- Fred Braceful (drums)

== Discography ==
- Exmagma (1973)
- Goldball (1974)
- Exmagma 3 (2006, recorded 1975)
