= Remembering the Moment =

Live album by David Friesen, Eddie Moore, Jim Pepper, Julian Priester & Mal Waldron
- Released: 1994
- Recorded: June 25, 1987
- Venue: The Hobbit in Portland, Oregon, United States
- Genre: Jazz
- Length: 67:03
- Label: Soul Note
- Producer: David Friesen

Mal Waldron chronology
Our Colline's a Treasure (1987)	Remembering the Moment (1994)	The Super Quartet Live at Sweet Basil (1987)

Remembering the Moment is a live album by David Friesen, Eddie Moore, Jim Pepper, Julian Priester and Mal Waldron, recorded in Portland, Oregon, in 1987 and released on the Italian Soul Note label.

== Reception ==
The AllMusic review by Scott Yanow stated, "An all-star quintet really gets an opportunity to stretch out on this date... Although there are not many explosive moments and few surprises, the playing is at a consistently high level, particularly when one considers that Pepper and Priester had never before played with some of the members of the rhythm section."

Professional ratings
Review scores
Source	Rating
AllMusic	4/5 stars
The Penguin Guide to Jazz Recordings	3.5/4 stars

== Track listing ==
1. "Autumn Leaves" (Joseph Kosma, Johnny Mercer, Jacques Prévert) – 22:05
2. "A Night in Tunisia" (Dizzy Gillespie) – 23:21
3. "All Blues" (Miles Davis) – 21:34

== Personnel ==
- David Friesen – double bass
- Eddie Moore – drums
- Jim Pepper – tenor saxophone
- Julian Priester – trombone
- Mal Waldron – piano
