= Two New =

Studio album by Mal Waldron & George Haslam
- Released: 1995
- Recorded: April 20, 1995
- Genre: Jazz
- Length: 73:22
- Label: Slam
- Producer: George Haslam

Mal Waldron chronology
Mal, Verve, Black & Blue (1994)	Two New (1995)	Maturity 4: Black Rain, White Road (1995)

Two New is an album by jazz pianist Mal Waldron and baritone saxophonist George Haslam, recorded in 1995 and released on the English Slam label.

== Reception ==
The AllMusic review by Steve Loewy stated that "there is a remarkable telepathy between the players, which translates to some delightful interaction between these two masters".

Professional ratings
Review scores
Source	Rating
AllMusic	4.5/5 stars
The Penguin Guide to Jazz Recordings	3/4 stars

== Track listing ==
All compositions by Mal Waldron and George Haslam except as indicated

1. "I've Got the World on a String" (Harold Arlen, Ted Koehler) – 6:25
2. "One for Steve" – 6:03
3. "Tangled Lawful Bells" – 5:14
4. "Let's Do It Over" (George Haslam) – 6:08
5. "Sakura Sakura (Cherry Blossom)" (Traditional) – 4:12
6. "Steps in Rhythm" (Haslam) – 5:09
7. "Datura" (Richard Leigh Harris) – 4:45
8. "From Charleston Till Now" – 9:39
9. "Come Sunday" (Duke Ellington) – 6:28
10. "I'm Old Fashioned" (Jerome Kern, Johnny Mercer) – 5:27
11. "After the Carnage" (Mal Waldron) – 4:42
12. "Thailand Dance" – 9:10

- Recorded in Oxfordshire, England, on April 20, 1995

== Personnel ==
- Mal Waldron – piano
- George Haslam – baritone saxophone, tarogato
