= Number Nineteen =

Live album by Mal Waldron
- Released: 1971
- Recorded: May 30, 1971
- Genre: Jazz
- Length: 43:14
- Label: Freedom (Japan)
- Producer: Alan Bates

Mal Waldron chronology
| First Encounter (1971) | Number Nineteen (1971) | Black Glory (1971) |

Number Nineteen is an album by American jazz pianist Mal Waldron featuring a performance recorded in Baarn, Holland in 1971 and released on the Freedom label.

== Track listing ==
All compositions by Mal Waldron except as indicated

1. "Number Nineteen" — 22:15
2. "Trip" — 10:09
3. "Watakushi No Sekai" — 10:40

- Recorded in Baarn, Holland on May 30, 1971.

== Personnel ==
- Mal Waldron — piano
- Dick Van Der Capellen — bass
- Martin Van Duynhoven — drums
