= Black Glory =

Live album by Mal Waldron
- Released: 1971
- Recorded: June 29, 1971
- Genre: Jazz
- Length: 41:11
- Label: Enja

Mal Waldron chronology
Number Nineteen (1971)	Black Glory (1971)	Mal Waldron Plays the Blues (1971)

Black Glory is a live album by American jazz pianist Mal Waldron recorded in Munich 1971 and released on the Enja label.

== Reception ==
The AllMusic review by Scott Yanow awarded the album 4 stars stating "Waldron is in excellent form... playing with a knowledge of the avant-garde but still connected to the hard bop tradition".

Professional ratings
Review scores
Source	Rating
AllMusic	4/5 stars

== Track listing ==
All compositions by Mal Waldron except as indicated

1. "M.C." (Jimmy Woode) – 0:35
2. "Sieg Haile" – 17:39 (referring to Haile Selassie and Sieg Heil)
3. "La Glorie du Noir" – 9:43
4. "The Call" – 6:38
5. "Rock My Soul" – 6:36
  - Recorded at the Domicile in Munich, West Germany on June 29, 1971.

== Personnel ==
- Mal Waldron – piano
- Jimmy Woode – bass
- Pierre Favre – drums
