= My Dear Family =

Studio album by Mal Waldron
- Released: 1994
- Recorded: September 21 & 24, 1993
- Genre: Jazz
- Length: 53:44
- Label: Evidence
- Producer: Makoto Kimata

Mal Waldron chronology
| Let's Call This... Esteem (1993) | My Dear Family (1994) | Waldron-Haslam (1994) |

My Dear Family is an album by jazz pianist Mal Waldron recorded in 1993 and released on the Evidence label.

== Reception ==
The Allmusic review by Matt Collar states "this is a superbly performed album by stellar, world-class musicians and should please most hardcore jazz fans."

Professional ratings
Review scores
| Source | Rating |
|---|---|
| Allmusic | 2.5/5 stars |

== Track listing ==
1. "Footprints" (Wayne Shorter) — 4:48
2. "Left Alone" (Billie Holiday, Mal Waldron) — 8:18
3. "Sassy" (Mal Waldron) — 4:02
4. "Sakura Sakura (Cherry Blossom)" (Traditional) — 9:04
5. "Here's That Rainy Day" (Johnny Burke, Jimmy Van Heusen) — 7:44
6. "Jean-Pierre" (Miles Davis) — 6:30
7. "Red Shoes" (Ujo Noguchi) — 7:59
8. "My Dear Family" (Mal Waldron) — 5:19

- Recorded in New York City on September 21 & 24, 1993

== Personnel ==
- Mal Waldron — piano
- Eddie Henderson — trumpet, flugelhorn (tracks 1, 3, 4 & 6–8)
- Grover Washington Jr. — soprano saxophone (tracks 1, 2 & 5)
- Reggie Workman — bass
- Pheeroan akLaff — drums
