= European Technical Center =

Coordinates: 50.0114°N 8.2877°E

The European Technical Center (ETC) is a U.S. National Security Agency (NSA) signals intelligence facility in Mainz-Kastel, Wiesbaden, Germany. Located in Building 4009 of the U.S. Army's Mainz-Kastel Storage Station, the facility serves as the NSA's "primary communications hub" in Europe. The center was known by the code name "GODLIKELESION".

== History ==
In December 2005, a metal object discovered near the facility was suspected of being an undetonated World War II explosive. On January 24, 2006, NSA analysts evacuated the ETC while the object was investigated, shutting down the center for a full day. The suspicious ordnance proved to be merely a "pile of junk".

In 2010, the center began experiencing technical difficulties, losing power over 150 times over the period of a few months. These events prompted the United States to expand and refurbish the facility, which was completed on September 19, 2011. Since then, the center has served as the NSA's "primary communications hub" in Europe, intercepting and forwarding large amounts of data to the NSA, U.S. military, and U.S. strategic partners in Europe, Africa and the Middle East.

The facility was disclosed in 2014 in documents released by the former NSA contractor Edward Snowden.
