= Expressive therapies continuum =

Model of creative functioning

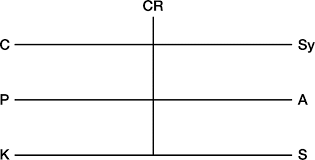
A diagram of the Expressive Therapies Continuum, depicting three horizontal levels of information processing and their potential for integration through creative mental activity, represented by the vertical “CR” level or dimension. The diagram first appeared in Imagery and Visual Expression in Therapy by Vija B. Lusebrink (1990).

The Expressive Therapies Continuum (ETC) is a model of creative functioning used in the field of art therapy that is applicable to creative processes both within and outside of an expressive therapeutic setting. The concept was initially proposed and published in 1978 by art therapists Sandra Kagin and Vija Lusebrink, who based the continuum on existing models of human development and information processing.

This schematic model serves to describe and assess an individual's level of creative functioning based on aspects such as the artist's purpose for creating a piece, choice of medium, interaction with the chosen medium, and imagery within the piece. Conversely, it also serves to meet the needs of the client by assisting the art therapist in choosing a developmentally or situationally appropriate activity or art medium. By analyzing an individual's art making process and the resulting artwork using the ETC, art therapists can assess strengths, weaknesses, and disconnect in various levels of a client's cognitive functioning - suggesting or substantiating diagnosis of, or recovery from, a mental health condition.

== History and Development ==
The Expressive Therapies Continuum was conceptualized by co-creators Lusebrink and Kagin after Lusebrink joined the faculty of the Institute of Expressive Therapies at the University of Louisville, which had been founded by Kagin. Kagin had earned a master's degree in special education and child psychology while working at a state facility in Kansas that served individuals with developmental and intellectual challenges. The institution received funding to study the adaptive behavior of residents, and this allowed Kagin to investigate their responses to media experiences in art therapy. Her thesis research revealed three discernable agents of change in the artmaking process; these could be therapeutically modified to affect client responses. She called these agents of change “Media Dimension Variables”, which consist of task complexity, task structure, and media properties.

Lusebrink's background included experience teaching art and volunteering at a state facility in California that served psychiatric populations. While at this institution she facilitated art therapy sessions and conducted research on individuals who had schizophrenia. She became involved in a study that examined the progression of schizophrenia among individuals who were not taking medication versus those who were. The brain wave studies that were collected in this research sparked Lusebrink's interest in the mental image formation process and the shift from nonconsciousness to consciousness. This interest ultimately led her to the work of psychologist Jerome Bruner and psychiatrist Mardi Horowitz. Each hypothesized a three-tier model related to the development of internal imagery based on physical, emotional, and intellectual information processing, and Lusebrink became fascinated with these concepts.

When Lusebrink learned about Kagin's Media Dimension Variables, she realized that task complexity, task structure, and media properties could be modified on an individualized basis to create therapeutic shifting among the levels of information processing that had been proposed by both Bruner and Horowitz. Lusebrink and Kagin collaborated to fuse their respective ideas into a framework that described how the targeted initiation of creative mental activity could yield therapeutic results by integrating overly differentiated kinds of information processing. Based on her earlier work with individuals who had developmental and intellectual challenges, Kagin made major contributions to the development of the Kinesthetic and Cognitive components of the ETC. Lusebrink's previous work with people who had schizophrenia positioned her to take the lead on formulating the Affective and Symbolic components.

In 1978 Lusebrink and Kagin published a paper, “The Expressive Therapies Continuum”, in the journal Art Psychotherapy (now The Arts in Psychotherapy). The article introduced the framework and exposed readers to concepts and terminology that were unfamiliar in art therapy at the time. The two presented the Expressive Therapies Continuum to their peers at the 1978 annual conference of the American Art Therapy Association, but the foreign-sounding ideas did not resonate with attendees.

Despite additional publications by Lusebrink, the development of knowledge and skills related to the ETC remained limited to Lusebrink and Kagin's students at the University of Louisville for several decades. During that time the two expanded their ideas, and the ETC evolved into an outcome-informed system that includes assessment, treatment planning, intervention, progress monitoring, and case conceptualization. In 2009 a former student of theirs, Lisa Hinz, published the first edition of Expressive Therapies Continuum: A Framework for Using Art in Therapy, and the ETC finally began to receive widespread recognition among art therapists in the United States. By that point in time the larger mental health field had begun to espouse ideas that aligned with the ETC; Lusebrink and Kagin's concepts and terminology no longer sounded so foreign to art therapy professionals.

== Levels of functioning ==
According to Lusebrink:

The first three levels of the ETC reflect three established systems of human information processing: the Kinesthetic/Sensory (K/S level); the Perceptual/Affective (P/A level); and the Cognitive/Symbolic (C/S level) ... The fourth level of the ETC is the Creative level (CR). It is seen as a synthesis of the other three levels of the continuum.

A diagram of the ETC, as pictured in the top right of the page, can be read from left to right and from the bottom, upwards. The model flows in a direction that travels from simple information processing and image formation to increasingly complex thought processes and interactions with the media. Individuals can fluctuate from level to level depending on personal and situational factors. They may also display an integration of all of the first three levels of functioning. This integration indicates that the individual is operating on the fourth and final level of functioning, known as the Creative level. The Creative level both transcends and intersects the prior three levels, in which the individual is either equally incorporating all aspects of the ETC or is able to find a satisfying and meaningful creative experience on one of the three levels alone.

However, an individual cannot wholly operate at both ends of a level, as each level is bipolar. For example, if the individual is more focused on the quick and scribbly movement of a chalk-pastel on paper, then he or she is less focused on the sensory aspects of the media, such as the sound of the chalk against the paper or the powdery feel of chalk in one's hand.

=== Kinesthetic/Sensory Level (K/S) ===
As the first level of the ETC, the Kinesthetic/Sensory level is described as a form of preverbal information processing that is "rhythmic, tactile, and sensual". This simple type of interaction with various art media stimulates primal areas of the brain and meets basic expressive needs—all while providing sensory and kinesthetic feedback for the artist. If an individual is operating at the kinesthetic end of the spectrum, he or she may find satisfaction in movement—i.e. pounding at a piece of clay or scribbling frantically with a crayon. In contrast, if the individual is gravitating towards the sensory end of the spectrum, he or she might take more pleasure in the feel of finger-paints or the smell of scented markers.

This level is particularly useful for young children but may also be useful for anyone needing to focus on sensorimotor skills. In addition, functioning at this level may allow for better access to preverbal memories or expression of extreme emotions. Individuals may identify operation at the K/S as a personal coping mechanism, in which the experience rather than the product is viewed as therapeutic.

=== Perceptual/Affective Level (P/A) ===
The second level of the ETC, the Perceptual/Affective level may or may not include verbal thought processes. However, the focus has shifted from the experience alone (with little focus on the outcome, as in the K/S level) to using the media to create an intentionally expressive or self-satisfying final product. The process may be characterized either by an individual's intent to express his or her own literal reality or be characterized by content that is "emotional and raw...without regard to form".

By working with individuals at the P/A level, art therapists can help clients to perceive images or notions in a new way, strengthening communication and assisting with the formation of meaningful relationships. They can also focus on the identification and healthy expression of one's emotions.

=== Cognitive/Symbolic Level (C/Sy) ===
Operation at the third level of the ETC, the cognitive/symbolic level, requires "complex and sophisticated" information processing, in which the individual consciously and strategically plans—prior to creating the art piece—for an expressive and self-satisfying final product. At this level, individuals are able to step outside their own sphere of perception and emotional expression and focus on ways that they interact with the world around them. They may begin to use satire and hidden meanings in their pieces to best express their unique response to their surroundings or situation (symbolic) or use art to plan and to problem-solve (cognitive).

=== Creative Level (Cr) ===
The final level, which either intersects the previous three levels or transcends above them, is the Creative level. This level symbolizes a wholeness, in which the individual achieves a sense of joy, fulfillment, or wellbeing by taking part in the creative process and expressing the self. This may be accomplished through the integration of the three previous levels (where there was inclusion of all expressive operations in the art-making process; a feeling of oneness) or success in fulfilling an individual's need at any given level, which may be healing in and of itself.

== Implications for art therapy ==
This model of creative functioning has been used by Cornelia Elbrecht as a theoretical framework to support sensorimotor art therapy. It is especially useful within trauma-informed practice because the three levels of creative functioning (K/S P/A C/Sy) can be linked to the three levels of neurobiological functioning as identified by neuroscientist and trauma-expert Bruce Perry in his Neurosequential 'RRR' model: regulate, relate, reason. Each level corresponds to a level of brain functioning which goes from: 1) REGULATING the nervous system thanks to autonomic homeostasis (the brainstem, cerebellum and mid-brain) which is also what happens at a K/S level during sensorimotor art therapy; 2) RELATING thanks to emotional resonance and the perception of facial expressions (the limbic system) which is also what happens at a P/A level when an emotional response occurs in relation to the colour and forms perceived in the artwork; 3) REASONING thanks to the identification of meaning in the process and/or finished product (thanks to the neo-cortex and executive functions), which is what happens at a C/Sy level.

Lusebrink and Hinz in their chapter "The expressive therapies continuum as a framework for the treatment of trauma" describe the continuum's usefulness for distinguishing 'bottom up' and 'top down' processes within psychodynamic art therapy. Within the field of psychodynamic art therapy Mimma Della Cagnoletta in Italy has developed an additional model "The three modalities of the creative process" which offers a framework that has been developed from Thomas Ogden's three states of experience. Instead of linking to neurobiological levels of functioning, Della Cagnoletta places the creative process within an intra- and extra-psychic framework derived from psychoanalytical perspective. As such the modalities explain the way in which the person is relating with their environment in terms of the fears and defense mechanisms that are operating, and the resources that are being activated. Having a simpler practical structure of only 3 modalities, it offers the art therapist an immediate and operational guide in the here and now of the service user’s relationship with the art materials during the creative process.
