= Art of the Duo (Mal Waldron and Jim Pepper album) =

Studio album by Mal Waldron & Jim Pepper
- Released: 1989
- Recorded: April 5 and December, 1988
- Genre: Jazz
- Length: 70:12
- Label: Tutu
- Producer: Peter Wiessmueller

Mal Waldron chronology
Evidence (1988)	Art of the Duo (1989)	No More Tears (For Lady Day) (1988)

Art of the Duo is an album by jazz pianist Mal Waldron and saxophonist Jim Pepper, recorded in 1988 and released on the German Tutu label.

== Reception ==
Professional ratings
Review scores
Source	Rating
The Penguin Guide to Jazz	3.5/4 stars
The Virgin Encyclopedia of Jazz	3/5 stars

The authors of The Penguin Guide to Jazz Recordings called the album "a vintage selection" that is "not for hardened cynics," and noted that, while Pepper gives "Over the Rainbow" "the kind of gruff bear-hug that he often brought to ballads," "the originals favour the saxophonist's relaxed blues phrasing."

Steve Vickery of Coda wrote: "this release is an intensely personal statement for the two musicians. With no rhythm section to provide propulsive energy, the impetus is on the duo to generate momentum for itself, something that presents no problem."

== Track listing ==
All compositions by Mal Waldron except where noted.

1. "Ticket to Tokyo" — 4:49
2. "Ruby, My Dear" (Thelonious Monk) — 6:45
3. "Bathing Beauties" (Jim Pepper) — 6:18
4. "Over the Rainbow" [Take One] (Harold Arlen, Yip Harburg) — 2:27
5. "Over the Rainbow" [Take Two] (Arlen, Harburg) — 3:23
6. "Spinning at Trixi" — 6:34
7. "Good Bait" (Tadd Dameron) 6:54
8. "You're No Bunny Unless Some Bunny Loves You" (Pepper, Waldron) — 4:12
9. "A Pepper Poem, Pt. 1" (Jim Pepper) — 2:05
10. "A Pepper Poem, Pt. 2" (Jim Pepper) — 2:10
11. "Willy's Blues" (Jim Pepper) — 4:45
12. "What Is This Thing Called Love?" (Cole Porter) — 5:56
13. "How Long Has This Been Going On?" (George Gershwin, Ira Gershwin) — 6:33
14. "Indian Water" (Jim Pepper) — 7:21

Recorded at Trixi Studios in Munich, West Germany, on April 5 and December, 1988

== Personnel ==
- Mal Waldron — piano
- Jim Pepper — tenor saxophone. soprano saxophone
