= A Touch of the Blues (Mal Waldron album) =

Live album by Mal Waldron
- Released: 1975
- Recorded: May 6, 1972
- Genre: Jazz
- Length: 38:16
- Label: Enja
- Producer: Alan Bates

Mal Waldron chronology
Jazz a Confronto 19 (1972)	A Touch of the Blues (1975)	Mal Waldron on Steinway (1972)

A Touch of the Blues is a live album by American jazz pianist Mal Waldron featuring performances recorded in Nuremberg, West Germany in 1972 and released on the Enja label.

== Reception ==
The AllMusic review awarded the album 3 stars.

Professional ratings
Review scores
Source	Rating
AllMusic	3/5 stars

== Track listing ==
All compositions by Mal Waldron

1. "Here, There And Everywhere" – 13:07
2. "The Search" – 8:07
3. "A Touch Of The Blues" – 17:02
  - Recorded at the East-West Jazz Festival in Nuremberg, West Germany, May 6, 1972

== Personnel ==
- Mal Waldron – piano
- Jimmy Woode – bass
- Allen Blairman – drums
