= The Call (Mal Waldron album) =

Studio album by Mal Waldron
- Released: 1971
- Recorded: February 1, 1971
- Genre: Jazz
- Length: 40:43
- Label: JAPO
- Producer: Manfred Eicher

Mal Waldron chronology
The Opening (1970)	The Call (1971)	Mal: Live 4 to 1 (1971)

The Call is an album by American jazz pianist Mal Waldron, recorded in 1971 and released on the JAPO label. The album was the first release on the short-lived European jazz label. It is Waldron's only album as a bandleader to feature him playing the electric piano.

== Reception ==
AllMusic awarded the album 3 stars. It was included as one of the 640 albums covered in the 2013 Japanese book Obscure Sound, written by Chee Shimizu. Shimizu praised the album for its "funky psychedelic groove" and interplay between Waldron's electric piano and Jimmy Jackson's organ.

Professional ratings
Review scores
Source	Rating
AllMusic	3/5 stars
DownBeat	3/5 stars
The Rolling Stone Jazz Record Guide	3/5 stars

== Track listing ==
All compositions by Mal Waldron

1. "The Call" — 18:53
2. "Thoughts" — 21:50

- Recorded at Tonstudio Bauer in Ludwigsburg, West Germany, on February 1, 1971.

== Personnel ==
- Mal Waldron — electric piano
- Jimmy Jackson — organ
- Eberhard Weber — electric bass
- Fred Braceful — drums, percussion
