= Et Cetera (Montreal band) =

French-Canadian band

Et Cetera was a French Canadian band of the 1970s. The band modeled itself on the sound of the English band Gentle Giant. The group comprised main singer Marie Bernard Pagé (keyboard and ondes Martenot), Denis Chartrand on keyboards, flute, saxophone, vibraphone), Pierre Dragon (drummer), Robert Marchand (guitar) and Alain-Yves Pigeon (bass and cello). The band issued their only, self-titled, LP album on Apostrophe in 1976 and disbanded shortly after.
