= Et Cetera (German band) =

German jazz rock band

Et Cetera is a German jazz rock band. Members include Wolfgang Dauner keys, Sigi Schwab on guitar, and Fred Braceful on drums. They are best known for their self-titled 1971 debut album Et Cetera. Their second album, Knirsch, features Larry Coryell on guitar and Jon Hiseman on drums.
