= Free at Last (Mal Waldron album) =

Studio album by the Mal Waldron Trio
- Released: 1970
- Recorded: November 24, 1969
- Studio: Studio Bauer; Ludwigsburg, W. Germany
- Genre: Jazz
- Length: 41:29
- Label: ECM; ECM 1001 ST
- Producer: Manfred Scheffner

Mal Waldron chronology
Set Me Free (1969)	Free at Last (1970)	Tokyo Bound (1970)

Free at Last is an album by American jazz pianist Mal Waldron, recorded in 1969 and released on the ECM label. The album was the first release on the influential European jazz label.

== Reception ==
Professional ratings
Review scores
Source	Rating
AllMusic	3/5 stars
Tom Hull	B+
The Penguin Guide to Jazz Recordings	3.5/4 stars

The AllMusic review by Scott Yanow states, "The music overall is not that memorable or unique but it does have its unpredictable moments and finds Waldron really stretching himself."

JazzTimes, in a retrospective analysis of ECM's first 50 years, commented, "It's doubtful that anyone who heard Free at Last in its day took particular notice of its fledgling label, but an unheeded message is still a message: We're on a different wavelength."

== Track listing ==
All tracks are written by Mal Waldron except as indicated.

Side I
No.	Title	Length
1.	"Rat Now"	10:18
2.	"Balladina"	5:05
3.	"1-3-234"	4:05

Side II
No.	Title	Writer(s)	Length
1.	"Rock My Soul"		11:23
2.	"Willow Weep for Me"	Ann Ronell	7:34
3.	"Boo"		3:24

== Personnel ==
Mal Waldron Trio

- Mal Waldron – piano
- Isla Eckinger – bass
- Clarence Becton – drums

Technical personnel

- Manfred Scheffner – producer
- Kurt Rapp – engineer
- Manfred Eicher – supervision
- Rufus Vedder – cover design
- Mal Waldron – liner notes
