= Daniel Caux =

French musicologist, essayist, journalist and music critic (1935–2008)

Daniel Caux (21 October 1935 – 12 July 2008) was a French musicologist, essayist, journalist, music critic, radio producer and organizer of musical events.

He was a member of the Académie Charles-Cros.

== Biography ==
After studying plastic arts at the École Duperré in Paris, and having devoted himself for several years to painting, Daniel Caux became known in the late 1960s as a specialist in new jazz trends, new American musical avant-garde, world music and marginalities of all kinds. From 1969 to 1975, he wrote in Combat, Jazz Hot, and held the musical section of the magazine L' Art vivant. From 1974 to 1976, he wrote a series of articles on Arab music in Charlie Mensuel and, from 1975 to 1979, he became a contributor to the daily Le Monde.

An organizer of musical events, in 1970 he brought the "Nuits de la Fondation Maeght", devoted that year to the United States, on the side of the great outsiders of the "free jazz" of American Blacks, the saxophonist Albert Ayler and, for the first time outside the United States, the great orchestra of Sun Ra. On the "underground" side of white contemporary music, he revealed the specific character of the minimal music current with the Théâtre de la musique éternelle of La Monte Young and the long repetitive variations of Terry Riley. He was at the origin of the coming to Paris of other important composers of this movement: Steve Reich in 1971 at the Théâtre de la musique and, within the framework of the Festival d'automne, Phil Glass in 1973, Robert Ashley and the "Sonic Arts Union" in 1974.

He participated in the artistic direction of the label Shandar, created by Chantal Darcy. The Shandar catalogue, which was entitled "Tomorrow's music today", includes Albert Ayler, Sun Ra and Cecil Taylor as well as the known American minimalists Terry Riley, Steve Reich, Phil Glass, and also several records of French musicians (Intercommunal Music by François Tusques, the duet Guitares Dérive by Vincent Le Masne and Bertrand Porquet, Obsolete by Dashiell Hedayat with the group Gong).

A radio man, Daniel Caux directed, during thirty years from 1970 to 1999, numerous musical programs on France Culture and France Musique.

In 1971, he travelled through Kabylia and in 1972, in the region of Oran, where he recorded traditional musics of Algeria. He visited many times the Maghreb countries, Egypt and the United States (East Coast and West Coast).

Under the name Un nouveau courant ("a new current"), he organized for France Culture, at the youth Biennial of the Musée d'art moderne de la ville de Paris, two series of concerts in 1980 that shed light on a musical approach deviated from the minimalist music that can be described as "postmodern" with, among others, the English Gavin Bryars and Michael Nyman, and the Californians Harold Budd and Daniel Lentz. In 1982, with the great orchestra of the American celestial tramp in the Black Forest, Moondog and the "Penguin Cafe Orchestra" of London.

At the request of Patrice Chéreau, he set up, with Alain Crombecque, in 1984 and 1985 at the Théâtre Nanterre-Amandiers, the twenty-five concerts that made up the Journées de musiques arabes.

Daniel Caux's efforts in favor of the "postmodernern" musical trend continued in Paris at the Théâtre de la Ville with the cycle D'autres musiques ("other musics") which allowed the Estonian composer Arvo Pärt to be discovered in 1986, and welcomed, until 1989, many outstanding musicians such as the Americans Jon Hassell, Michael Galasso and Glenn Branca. In 1995, after devoting several radio broadcasts to the American composer Harry Partch, with whom he had a correspondence in the early 1970s with a view to organize a concert in France, he could finally realize this twenty-five-year-old project at the "Festival America" of Lille. The instruments built by Harry Partch were played there - for the first time in France - by Dean Drummond's "Newband".

For twenty years, from 1970 to 1990, Daniel Caux was a lecturer at the Paris 8 University (in Vincennes, then Saint-Denis).

In the 1980s and 1990s, he wrote in art press and Le Nouvel Observateur and participated in numerous collective publications.

In the wake of his interest in research in electronic music, the repetitiveness of minimalist music and the obsessive nature of traditional trance music, he turned in the mid-1990s, into the defender of techno music on which he wrote in various publications, in particular in the special issue of Art Press: Techno, anatomie des cultures électroniques published in 1998. For France Culture, he directed in February 1999 "Hypnomixotechno", the first series of in-depth radio programs devoted in France to this musical phenomenon .

In 1994, Daniel Caux was musical curator of the exhibition Hors limite (off limit) at the Centre Georges Pompidou. For the celebration of the year 2000 in France, he was musical curator of the great exhibition Beauté in Avignon (with, among others, an electronic environment through the Palais des Papes in Avignon by the Canadian composer and DJ Richie Hawtin).

For three years, from 1999 to 2002, he served as music advisor at the head of France Culture.

Daniel Caux died Saturday 12 July 2008 in Paris. In the promotion of 14 July 2008, Daniel Caux was posthumously nominated as Officer of the Ordre des Arts et des Lettres.

== Career on radio ==
- 1999 to 2002: director of musical programmes of France Culture
- 1999: producer of the weekly program Circuits alternatifs. (France Culture)
- 1995 to 1999: producer of the weekly program Transversales. (France Culture)
- 1992 to 1995: producer of the weekly program Les magiciens de la Terre (France Musique).
- 1978 to 1999: producer of the Programme musical (France Culture).
- 1978 to 1985: producer of Les Nuits magnétiques (France Culture).
- 1975 to 1977: producer of the weekly programs Musiques extra-européennes and En marge (France Musique).
- 1970 to 1987: producteur for the Atelier de création radiophonique (France Culture).
- 1969 to 1970: collaborates on the jazz programs of Lucien Malson and André Francis (France Culture).

== Bibliography, documents ==
- Caux, Daniel (1983). Urban sax (in French). Paris: Jannink. p. 47. ISBN 978-2902462124..
- Peter Greenaway, with Florence De Meredieu, Michael Nyman, Philippe Pilard, Michel Feld - Dis Voir, 1987.
- John Cage, with Jean-Yves Bosseur- Musique ouverte, 1993.
- L'expérience de la durée with Thierry Raspail, Gérard Wormser, Claude Burgelin, Jean-Baptiste Chantoiseau, Madeleine Fondo-Valette, François Hartog, Yann Kilborne, Étienne Klein and Ingeburg Lachaussée - Parangon, 2007.
- Musique arabe, Vibrations.
- Le Silence, les couleurs du prisme et la mécanique du temps qui passe, Paris, Éditions de l'éclat , 2009; Recueil d'articles et d'entretiens de « John Cage à la Techno »; photos de Philippe Gras et Christian Rose.
- Les couleurs du prisme et la mécanique du temps, film by Jacqueline Caux.
