= New Grass =

Studio album by Albert Ayler
- Released: 1968
- Recorded: September 5–6, 1968
- Genre: Jazz
- Length: 33:09
- Label: Impulse! MCA (reissue)
- Producer: Bob Thiele

Albert Ayler chronology
Love Cry (1967)	New Grass (1968)	Music Is the Healing Force of the Universe (1969)

New Grass is a 1968 album by jazz saxophonist Albert Ayler released on Impulse! Records.

The album mixed Ayler's familiar tenor saxophone playing with elements from R&B and other genres, including a soul horn section, backing singers, and rock electric bass. There are even some tracks where Ayler sings.

The album was remastered and re-released by Third Man Records in 2020.

== Reception ==
Professional ratings
Review scores
Source	Rating
Allmusic	3.5/5 stars
DownBeat	2.5/5 stars
The Penguin Guide to Jazz Recordings	3/4 stars
Pitchfork	8.7/10 stars
The Rolling Stone Jazz Record Guide	2/5 stars

It met a hostile reception from fans and critics alike on its release, with many accusing Ayler of "selling out". Larry Neal wrote: "lately Albert's music seems to be motivated by forces that are not at all compatible with his genius. There is even a strong hint that the brother is being manipulated by Impulse records. Or is it merely the selfish desire for popularity in the american sense?... At any rate, this album is a failure... the direct confrontation with experience as lived by the artist himself is not there." AllMusic Guide's Al Campbell nevertheless calls the album "misunderstood", speculating that Impulse had encouraged Ayler to go in a more commercial direction, and he had willingly acquiesced. However, according to Gary Giddins, "In interviews, Ayler left no doubt about who was responsible for New Grass: 'They told me to do this. Bob Thiele. You think I would do that? He said, "Look Albert, you gotta get with the young generation now."'"

Ayler was hurt by the negative reaction to the album. He responded: "You have to make changes in life just like dying and being born again, artistically speaking. You become very young again through this process, then you grow up, and listen and grow young again."

Recent reviews have been more sympathetic. The authors of The Penguin Guide to Jazz wrote: "this isn't the ghastly sell-out some Albert fans would love you to think... Albert's sound here... isn't so very different from that of the revered Spiritual Unity... Ayler made an apparently radical stylistic switch in order to maintain the integrity of his vision." They conclude that the album is "not a masterpiece, but not the monster that's been painted. New Grass has had to wait a long time for reassessment. It stands up gratifyingly well."

Fred Thomas, writing for Pitchfork, attempted to place the album in perspective, commenting: "This certainly wasn't jazz of any kind, but was too overstimulated and confused to pass for the Woodstock-generation rock'n'roll it was trying to emulate. What was this?... New Grass signaled the beginning of a descent into darkness for Ayler, one that saw him grasping at ideals of redemption and healing all the way down... Ayler's spiritual message... grew weirder and more intimate as he struggled to deliver it in a way that could be universally understood... Ayler's notion of popular music was so distanced from reality that it became its own self-contained universe."

In an article for Glide Magazine, Jim Hynes stated: "As edgy and far-out that Ayler was for many, New Grass in some respects was his most accessible album. Yet, even though it was misunderstood and virtually hated by critics and fans alike, it has ironically stood the test time and become a landmark album of sorts... Jazz and even avant-garde was well accepted and established while soul music was viewed by many as primitive. Ayler challenged these norms by melding the two in this adventurous outing, filled with joyous grooves, unbridled passionate vocals, and surprising arrangements. Nothing existed like this before, and nothing has since... New Grass... stands as a landmark that influenced generations of jazz, R&B, funk, hip-hop, post punk and other forms... Misunderstood, hated, experimental... Today New Grass would be hailed as nothing short of brilliant – a huge, uplifting, healing dose of joy."

== Track listing ==
1. "Message From Albert/New Grass" (Albert Ayler, Bert de Coteaux) – 3:53
2. "New Generation" (Ayler, Rose Marie McCoy, Mary Maria Parks) – 5:06
3. "Sun Watcher" (Ayler, Robin Syler) – 7:29
4. "New Ghosts" (Ayler, Parks) – 4:10
5. "Heart Love" (Ayler, Parks) – 5:32
6. "Everybody's Movin'" (Ayler, McCoy, Parks) – 3:43
7. "Free At Last" (Ayler, McCoy, Parks) – 3:08

== Personnel ==
=== Performance ===
- Albert Ayler – recitation, tenor saxophone, vocals, whistling
- Garnett Brown – trombone
- Call Cobbs – electric harpsichord, harp, organ, piano
- Burt Collins – trumpet
- Bill Folwell – bass, electric bass
- Buddy Lucas – bass, baritone saxophone
- Rose Marie McCoy – vocals
- Joe Newman – trumpet
- Seldon Powell – flute, tenor sax
- Bernard "Pretty" Purdie – drums
- Soul Singers – vocals

=== Production ===
- Bert de Coteaux – arranger, conductor
- Ken Druker – executive producer
- Henry Epstein – cover design, liner design
- Byron Goto – cover design
- Bob Irwin – reissue mastering
- Gary Kellgren – engineer
- Hollis King – reissue art director
- Bryan Koniarz – reissue producer

- Elliott Landy – cover photo, photography
- Shigeo Miyamoto – mastering engineer
- Mary Maria Parks – composer
- Jayme Pieruzzi – reissue mastering
- Robin Syler – composer
- John F. Szwed – liner notes
- Bob Thiele – engineer, producer
