= George Who? =

George Who? (French: George qui?) is a 1973 French biographical film directed by Michèle Rosier and starring Anne Wiazemsky, Alain Libolt and Denis Gunsbourg. Philosopher Gilles Deleuze also featured in the film. The film depicts the life of the French author George Sand.

== Partial cast ==
- Anne Wiazemsky as George Sand
- Alain Libolt as Charles Fleury
- Denis Gunsbourg as Casimir Dudevant
- Geneviève Mnich as Ursule
- Didier Flamand as Juste Olivier
- Jean-Gabriel Nordmann as Jules Sandeau
- Claude Fagel as The fiddler / The watchman
- Bulle Ogier as Marie Dorval
- Gilles Deleuze as Lamennais
- Yves Rénier as Alfred de Musset
- Jean-Michel Ribes as Pierre Leroux
- Pierre Kalinovski as Frédéric Chopin
- Jean Benguigui as The musical critic
