= Mal Waldron =

American jazz pianist and composer (1925–2002)

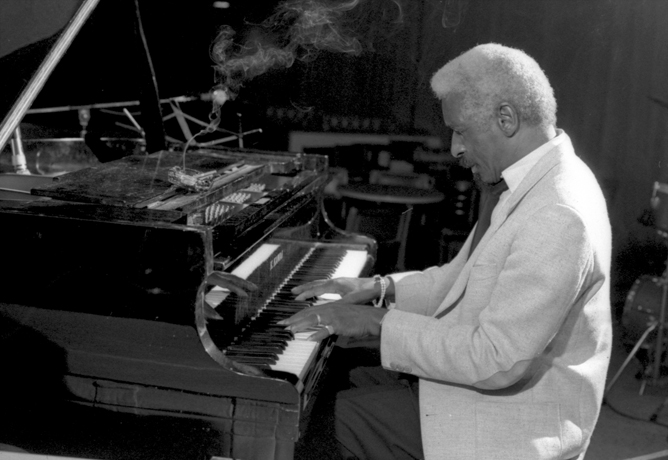
- Mal Waldron in 1987

Background information
- Born: Malcolm Earl Waldron; August 16, 1925; New York City, New York, United States
- Died: December 2, 2002 (aged 77) Brussels, Belgium
- Genres: Avant-garde jazz Hard bop Modal jazz Post-bop
- Occupations: Musician, composer, arranger
- Instrument: Piano
- Years active: Early 1950s–2002

Malcolm Earl "Mal" Waldron (August 16, 1925 – December 2, 2002) was an American jazz pianist, composer, and arranger. He started playing professionally in New York in 1950, after graduating from college. In the following dozen years or so Waldron led his own bands and played for those led by Charles Mingus, Jackie McLean, John Coltrane, and Eric Dolphy, among others. During Waldron's period as house pianist for Prestige Records in the late 1950s, he appeared on dozens of albums and composed for many of them, including writing his most famous song, "Soul Eyes", for Coltrane. Waldron was often an accompanist for vocalists, and was Billie Holiday's regular accompanist from April 1957 until her death in July 1959.

A breakdown caused by a drug overdose in 1963 left Waldron unable to play or remember any music; he regained his skills gradually, while redeveloping his speed of thought. He left the U.S. permanently in the mid-1960s, settled in Europe, and continued touring internationally until his death.

In his 50-year career, Waldron recorded more than 100 albums under his own name and more than 70 for other band leaders. He also wrote for modern ballet, and composed the scores of several feature films. As a pianist, Waldron's roots lay chiefly in the hard bop and post-bop genres of the New York club scene of the 1950s, but with time he gravitated more towards free jazz. He is known for his dissonant chord voicings and distinctive later playing style, which featured repetition of notes and motifs.

== Early life ==
Mal Waldron was born in New York City on August 16, 1925, to West Indian immigrants. His father was a mechanical engineer who worked on the Long Island Rail Road. The family moved to Jamaica, Queens, when Mal was four years old. Waldron's parents discouraged his initial interest in jazz, but he was able to maintain it by listening to swing on the radio. Waldron had classical piano lessons from the age of around seven until he was about 16. He then became inspired to play jazz on tenor saxophone when he heard Coleman Hawkins' 1939 recording of "Body and Soul", but bought an alto saxophone, unable to afford a tenor. He played alto for local bands that performed for "dances, bar mitzvahs, Spanish weddings", frequently taking over the pianist's role when other musicians took their solos.

In 1943, after high school and having enrolled in college, Waldron was called up by the army, and was based at West Point, in New York. This allowed him to listen to the greats of jazz in clubs on 52nd Street and elsewhere in the city. After two years in the army, he returned as a student to Queens College in New York, where he studied under composer Karol Rathaus and made the final decision to switch from saxophone to piano. This decision was influenced in part by hearing Charlie Parker's virtuoso speed on saxophone, and by not having the extroverted personality Waldron thought necessary for that instrument. Not yet a professional musician, he received money through the G.I. Bill and continued to live with his parents. After obtaining a B.A. in music in 1949, Waldron worked for a short time in rhythm and blues bands, including with Big Nick Nicholas.

== Later life and career ==
=== Early career in New York ===
Waldron went on to work with Ike Quebec in New York in 1950 and made his recording debut with the saxophonist in 1952. They played at Café Society Downtown on Mondays for six or seven months, which helped Waldron gain exposure and more work. Waldron worked frequently with Charles Mingus from 1954 to 1956, as part of the latter's jazz composers' workshop. He was pianist on several Mingus recordings, including Pithecanthropus Erectus, which was a key development in the movement towards freer collective improvisation in jazz. In 1955, Waldron worked with Lucky Millinder and Lucky Thompson. Waldron formed his own band in 1956, which consisted of Idrees Sulieman (trumpet), Gigi Gryce (alto saxophone), Julian Euell (bass), and Arthur Edgehill (drums). This band recorded Waldron's first release as a leader, Mal-1, in November of that year. Waldron was Billie Holiday's regular accompanist from April 1957 until her death in July 1959, including for the all-star television broadcast The Sound of Jazz.

Waldron played on numerous sessions for Prestige Records from 1956 to 1958, as he was the house pianist with the label, a position he acquired after being introduced to Prestige by saxophonist Jackie McLean. Waldron appeared on several McLean-led recordings, and was praised by critic John S. Wilson for these performances as being "a consistently interesting and inventive pianist, who apparently can create fresh and provocative ideas even in the midst of a shrilling bedlam". Other leaders he worked under at Prestige included Gene Ammons, Kenny Burrell, John Coltrane, and Phil Woods. Waldron often used his own arrangements and compositions for the Prestige sessions, of which his most famous, "Soul Eyes", written for Coltrane, became a widely recorded jazz standard following its initial appearance on the 1957 album Interplay for 2 Trumpets and 2 Tenors. He composed at night at home in St. Albans between all-day recording sessions, and in a car traveling to and from the studio in Hackensack. Waldron estimated that he composed more than 400 pieces of music during his time with Prestige.

After Holiday died, Waldron played with vocalist Abbey Lincoln and her husband, drummer Max Roach. Around this time, Waldron's playing on his own recordings became darker, featuring emotional shifts and variations in minor keys. In 1961, Waldron played in Eric Dolphy and Booker Little's quintet, a promising combination that ended when Little died that year, aged 23.

In addition to writing for his own band and those led by others, Waldron wrote and arranged for early play-along records that were published by Music Minus One. Some of these recordings on which Waldron played were released under his name. He also wrote scores for modern ballet in the 1950s and started writing film scores in the following decade. His writing for the film The Cool World (released in 1964) was described in The Oxford Companion to Jazz as one of the first attempts to stress improvisation rather than composition in a jazz-based film score.

=== Breakdown and recovery ===
In 1963 Waldron had a major breakdown caused by a heroin overdose. He recounted in 1998 that a lot of musicians in the 1950s and 1960s felt that taking drugs was necessary for career progression. The police assumed they were all doing it; according to Waldron:

The police would stop the musicians and search us as we came out of the clubs after work. We had to turn our pockets inside out. After a while, the musicians thought ... well, if you have the name you might as well have the game. Eventually, I overdosed. I couldn't remember my own name. My hands were trembling, I couldn't play the piano. I needed shock treatments and a spinal tap to bring me back.

Waldron always felt that he had to return to playing, but this was a slow process. About a year after the overdose, his physical recovery was sufficient to allow him to start relearning his skills, which he did partly by listening to his own records. His recovery as a musician continued for another two years, as his speed of thought was still too slow over that period to allow genuine improvisation: "I worked out my solos in advance and played what I had written out, until gradually all my faculties returned".

=== Career after move to Europe ===
From the mid-1960s on, Waldron spent a lot of time in Europe: Paris, Rome, Bologna, and Cologne, before moving permanently to Munich in 1967. Waldron originally moved to France when film director Marcel Carné asked him if he wanted to compose the score for Three Rooms in Manhattan in New York or Paris; Waldron's 1958 experience touring Europe with Holiday made the decision an easy one. Waldron's stated reasons for settling in Europe were his disgust with the "fierce, cutthroat competition, just to get a job" and the fact that black musicians were paid less than their white counterparts in the U.S. The 1965 score for Three Rooms in Manhattan was followed by one for the American film Sweet Love, Bitter in 1967. Waldron also composed for theater (Amiri Baraka's The Slave and Dutchman), television, and short films. In Europe around this time he played with other expatriates, including Ben Webster and Kenny Clarke.

Waldron's 1969 album Free at Last was the first release on the ECM label. This recording was an example of Waldron playing, in his words, "rhythmically instead of soloing on chord changes". Two years later, another Waldron recording session was the first for another label that became firmly established – Enja Records. His 1971 album The Call was the first release on the ECM sublabel JAPO; it features Waldron playing an electric piano. In the early 1970s, he collaborated with the German krautrock band Embryo on the albums Steig Aus! and Rocksession. Waldron also wrote the score for the 1972 French film George Who?

Waldron became popular in Japan, first playing there in 1970, after being invited by Swing Journal following the success of one of his earlier recordings. From 1975 he made visits to the U.S., mostly playing solo piano from the late 1970s to early 1980s. Other formats included a quartet with Joe Henderson, Herbie Lewis, and Freddie Waits; another quartet with Charlie Rouse, Calvin Hill and Horacee Arnold; a trio with Hill and Arnold; and a duo with Cameron Brown. Waldron performed and recorded extensively throughout Europe and Japan. In the early 1980s he reported that he allotted agents in France, Germany, Italy and Scandinavia a month each per year of his time, but set aside two months for Japan.

During the 1980s and 1990s Waldron worked with Steve Lacy, notably in piano–soprano duets playing their own compositions as well as Thelonious Monk's. Duet albums with others were also prominent in Waldron's recordings from the early 1980s. This setting was chosen partly for economic reasons, but mainly for artistic ones, Waldron stated: "jazz is like a conversation. [...] So to do this face to face, it is more direct, stronger and more accurate". A further film score was written for Japanese director Haruki Kadokawa's Tokyo Blues in 1986.

Waldron moved from Munich to Brussels in the 1990s, stating that, in Belgium, "nobody stands on the corner waiting for the lights to change. In Germany they watch the lights instead of the cars. The lights never killed anybody." From the mid-1990s, Waldron traveled to the U.S. less frequently, put off by no longer being allowed to smoke in many of the jazz clubs there. Around the same period, Waldron recorded several albums with vocalist Jeanne Lee. Two of his final recordings were duets with saxophonists who tended, as he did, to play in melodic and free forms: David Murray and Archie Shepp. After some years of indifferent health, Waldron, a heavy smoker, was diagnosed with cancer in 2002. He continued to perform until his death on December 2 of that year in a hospital in Brussels, due to complications resulting from the cancer. He was 77, and had played his final concert in Lille two weeks earlier.

== Personal life ==
Waldron married twice and had seven children – two with his first wife and five with the second. Billie Holiday was godmother to his first daughter. Waldron's first wife, Elaine, occasionally sang on his recordings. His second wife was Japanese, and they owned and let several apartments in Japan. Combining birthday celebrations with a tour, Waldron took both families – ex-wife, wife, seven children and two grandchildren – on his three-week tour of Japan that coincided with his seventieth birthday. Waldron's mother died in 1979. He could speak English, French, German, and Japanese.

== Artistry ==
When he first played with Mingus, Waldron was a follower of Horace Silver's style, which used added chords and passing notes, as well as Bud Powell's, which contained many runs. Mingus encouraged him to strip away these things and concentrate on basic and altered harmonies. Before his breakdown, Waldron played in a lyrical way, but after it, "I couldn't find that lyricism inside myself any more, so I became a very angular player", becoming more like Thelonious Monk in playing and composition style.

From the time he moved to Europe, Waldron played mostly in a free style, while being able to play in a more traditional style when the audience or situation required it. He used thick chords in the lower bass register; his emphasis on weight, texture and frequent repetition of a single and simple motif as opposed to linear and melodic improvisation gave a heavy and dark color to his sound. One facet of his playing was, according to The Penguin Guide to Jazz, "likened to American minimalism: a slow accretion of almost subliminal harmonic and rhythmic shifts steadily pile up until the music seems ready to overbalance".

As an accompanist to vocalists Holiday, Lincoln, Lee and others, Waldron was described by critic and musician Alyn Shipton as "one of the most sublime accompanists in jazz".

Waldron's own assessment of his style was that it was partly a reflection of his personality: "It's part of my personality to be very economical with what I have and to use it in all variations before I move to the next set of notes". He acknowledged the influences of Holiday (on his conception of space and playing behind the beat), Mingus (for the importance of individuality), and Roach (on the value of time signatures other than the usual 4/4), as well as pianists Duke Ellington, Monk, Powell and Art Tatum.

== Influence ==
Waldron has influenced later generations of pianists. Examples are Matthew Shipp and Stanley Cowell. Another, Ethan Iverson, describes Waldron as one of his biggest influences, and reports having imitated most aspects of the older man's style during his own musical development, through listening to Waldron's recordings. Waldron contributed more personally to Ran Blake's progress: he was Blake's teacher for a time, helping him to improve his rhythmic flexibility and idea development.
