= Peter Madcat Ruth discography =

This is the discography of American harmonica player Peter "Madcat" Ruth .

== Discography ==
- 1970 - New Heavenly Blue - Educated Homegrown
- 1971 - Dave Brubeck - Truth
- 1972 - Dave Brubeck - Truth Is Fallen
- 1972 - New Heavenly Blue - New Heavenly Blue
- 1973 - Dave Brubeck - Two Generations of Brubeck
- 1973 - Nancy Johnson - Mellow Lady
- 1974 - Dave Brubeck - Brother, the Great Spirit Made Us All
- 1975 - Peter Berkow & Friends Thesis
- 1975 - Sky King - Secret Sauce
- 1975 - Tom Mitchell - Tom Mitchell
- 1976 - Peter Stark - Mushroom Country
- 1977 - Bob White - Bob White
- 1978 - Mike Smith - Mike Smith and the Country Volunteers
- 1978 - Rosalie Sorrels - Traveling Lady Rides Again
- 1979- Ken Nordine - Stare With Your Ears
- 1980 - Blackfoot - Tomcattin'
- 1980 - David Walz - Country Old Country New
- 1980 - Friedlander & Hall - Utah Moon
- 1980 - The First Few - Could It Be?
- 1980 - Trees - Let It Out
- 1982 - Gemini - Good Mischief
- 1982 - Rene Meave - A Man In Love
- 1982 - Various Artists - Cruisin' Ann Arbor
- 1983 - Gemini - Swinging
- 1983 - Gemini - The Long Journey Called Home
- 1983 - Rich and Maureen DelGrosso - Toe Tappin'
- 1983 - Rozaa "Rosay" Wortham - The Unpredictable Moods Of Rosay
- 1984 - Gemini - Rhythmically Moving 6
- 1984 - Peter Madcat Ruth - Madcat Gone Solo
- 1984 - Various Artists - Heavey Duty Harpin'
- 1985 - Iowa Rose - Yellow Roses
- 1985 - The Urbations - The Urbations
- 1986 - Gemini - Pulling Together
- 1986 - Ken Nordine - Grandson of Word Jazz
- 1986 - Kitty Donohoe - Farmer In Florida
- 1986 - Yank Rachell - Blues Mandolin Man
- 1987 - Micro Wave and Bootsy Collins - Cookin' From The Inside Out!!!
- 1988 - B&R - To Find You
- 1989 - Gemini - Growing Up Together
- 1989 - Madcat's Pressure Cooker - Live at The Pig
- 1991 - Rory Block - Mama's Blues
- 1991 - Cincinnati Pops Orchestra - Down On The Farm
- 1991 - Cincinnati Pops Orchestra - The Music Man (1991 Concert Cast Recording)
- 1991 - Catfish Keith - Pepper In My Shoe
- 1992 - Madcat & Kane - Key To the Highway
- 1992 - Bill Crofut & Chris Brubeck - Red White & Blues
- 1993 - Rosalie Sorrels - Travelin' Lady Rides Again
- 1993 - Jamie James - Cruel World
- 1994 - Friedlander and Hall - Factory Town
- 1994 - Dan Hall - Fire In The Sun
- 1994 - Peter Madcat Ruth - Harmonicology
- 1995 - Robin & Linda Williams - Good News
- 1995 - Gemini - Lullabies For Our Children
- 1995 - Andy Boller - Face The Light Alone
- 1996 - various artists - Blues From The Heart, Vol. II
- 1996 - Stan Borys - Niczyj
- 1996 - Camille West - Mother Tongue
- 1997 - Kevin Maul - Toolshed
- 1998 - Laz Slomovits - Bright In All Of Us
- 1998 - David Menefee - Brighter Side Of Blue
- 1998 - Chris Buhalis - Kenai Dreams
- 1998 - Anne Hills and Cindy Mangsen - Never Grow Up
- 1999 - Rollie Tussing III - Blow Whistle Blow
- 1999 - Madcat & Kane - Up Against The Wall
- 1999 - Kentucky Standard Band - Kentucky Skies
- 1999 - Julie Austin - Fandagumbo
- 1999 - David Mosher - Long Night Moon
- 1999 - Triple Play - Triple Play Live
- 2000 - Madcat & The Cats - Live at the Ark
- 2000 - Gemini - With You
- 2001 - Patricia Pettinga - Time
- 2001 - Muruga GVCB - God Bless America
- 2001 - Leslie Ritter & Scott Petito - Circles In The Sand
- 2001 - Laz Slomovits - Harbor of the Heart
- 2001 - Joel Mabus - Six of One
- 2001 - Various Artists - Tell It. Think It. Speak It. Breathe It.
- 2002 - The Raisin Pickers - Drivin'
- 2002 - Muruga GVCB - One Global Village
- 2002 - Mississippi Heat - Footprints On The Ceiling
- 2002 - Matt Watroba - The Best Is Yet To Be
- 2002 - Blues Etc. - Blues Etc.
- 2003 - Triple Play - Watching The World
- 2003 - Mustards Retreat - A Resolution Of Something
- 2003 - Jefferson Goncalves - Greia
- 2003 - George Clinton - Six Degrees of P-Funk: The Best of George Clinton & His Funky Family
- 2004 - Beowulf Kingsley (Todd Perkins) - Arphus Schmarphus Horkus Porkus
- 2004 - William Bolcom - Songs of Innocence and of Experience
- 2004 - Rosalie Sorrels - My Last Go Round
- 2004 - Matt Watroba - Jukebox Folk
- 2004 - Jim Bizer - Connected
- 2005 - Hank Woji - Medallion
- 2005 - Mustards Retreat - MR7
- 2005 - Jesse Richards - Wild Card
- 2005 - Joel Brown - Christmas Cedar And Spruce
- 2005 - Peter Madcat Ruth - Live In Rio
- 2006 - Peter Madcat Ruth - Harmonica & Ukulele Project
- 2006 - Asylum Street Spankers - Pussycat Bootleg Series, Vol. 2: Live Rarities 2000-2004
- 2006 - Jen Sygit - Leaving Marshall St.
- 2006 - Bruce Worman - Love Nudge Reminders
- 2007 - Root Doctor - Change Our Ways
- 2007 - Robert James - Easy Avenue
- 2007 - Jesse Richards - Green Band
- 2007 - Mario Resto - Radio 2 MCD Project
- 2007 - Jefferson Goncalves - Ar Puro
- 2007 - George Kerby - Out Of The Corridor
- 2007 - Gabe Bolkosky & San Slomovits - Home From Work
- 2007 - Beale Street - Vibratto
- 2007 - Annie and Rod Capps - In This Town
- 2008 - Dave Brubeck - Only the Best of Dave Brubeck
- 2008 - Mr. Vegas Man - Hey Santa
- 2008 - Todd Perkins - Arphus Shmarphus Horkus Porkus
- 2008 - Bob White - Bob White - Collectors Series
- 2008 - Rosalie Sorrels - Strangers in Another Country
- 2008 - Copper Tom - Get the Beat!
- 2008 - Seth Bernard - This Here
- 2008 - Peter Madcat Ruth - More Real Folk Blues
- 2009 - Laszlo Slomovits - Rumi - Gamble Everything For Love
- 2009 - Cairn to Cairn - Cairn to Cairn
- 2009 - Seth Bernard - Is This You?
- 2009 - Madcat, Kane & Maxwell Street - Live at the Creole Gallery
- 2010 - Trees - One Voice
- 2010 - Laszlo Slomovits - Hafiz and Mystical Companions
- 2010 - Katie Geddes - We Are Each Other's Angels
- 2011 - Joel Brown - Places
- 2011 - Booker, Dansby, Sauter & Love - The Hand I Was Dealt
- 2012 - Dr. Mike & The Sea Monkeys - Meet The Sea Monkeys
- 2012 - Dave Boutette - Mending Time
- 2012 - Chris Brubeck's Triple Play - Live at Zankel Music Center
- 2013 - Muruga & The Cosmic Hoedown Band - Changing The Sound of Your Room
- 2014 - Seth Bernard - Reconciliation and the Mystical Beyonda
- 2014 - Jeff Daniels - Days Like These
- 2014 - The Madcat Midnight Blues Journey - Live at Salt of the Earth
- 2015 - Sumkali - Tihai
- 2015 - Dave Boutette - 1st Rate Companion
- 2016 - T (Featuring Muruga & Madcat Ruth) - Deer Camp
- 2017 - Seth Bernard - Eggtones Blues
- 2017 - Mighty Michael, Peter Madcat Ruth, Muruga Booker - Passing The Torch
- 2017 - Various Artists - Michigan Music Resistance Vol. 1
- 2017 - Booker Blues All-Stars - Booker Plays Hooker
