= Jacques Coursil =

- Born: Jacques Coursil; March 31, 1938; Paris, France
- Died: June 26, 2020 (aged 82) Plombières, Belgium
- Genres: Jazz, free jazz, avant-garde jazz
- Occupations: Musician, linguist, professor
- Instrument: Trumpet

Jacques Coursil (March 31, 1938 – June 26, 2020) was a French composer, jazz trumpeter, scholar, and professor of literature, linguistics, and philosophy.

== Early life ==
Coursil was born in Paris, France, of Martinican parents. At age nine, he began studying the violin, but switched to trumpet as a teenager. His earliest musical influences included classical composers such as Webern and Schoenberg, jazz, especially that of New Orleans musicians such as Albert Nicholas and Sidney Bechet, and liturgical music, as well as Martinican-influenced biguine. At the age of 14, Coursil had the opportunity to hear saxophonist Don Byas, who made a deep impression, "with a white suit, white shoes, a shiny saxophone, playing so sweetly."

In 1958, Coursil left for Africa, spending three years in Mauritania and Senegal, where he befriended Léopold Sédar Senghor, politician, poet and theorist of Négritude. In 1961, he returned to France, working as a teacher and studying literature and mathematics.

== New York ==
In 1965, following the assassination of Malcolm X, and drawn to the free jazz he'd heard on records, Coursil moved to New York. Upon his arrival, he took up residence in a building in lower Manhattan where his neighbors were drummer Sunny Murray, saxophonist Frank Wright, and "a blues guy from the South" who "made such a sound that the whole building would be shaking." During this time, Coursil supported himself by working as a bartender and dishwasher at the Dom, a club that would later be called the Electric Circus, and by playing jazz and rock music. He also studied with pianist Jaki Byard and composer Noel DaCosta. Regarding his musical interests at the time, Coursil stated: "I firmly intended to deconstruct the whole apparatus of rhythm. I wanted to 'destroy' the beat and harmony too. So, I wanted to play atonal without any rhythmic framework. I also wanted to stop playing scales, to get away from melody."

Later that year, Coursil joined Sunny Murray's band, leading to his first appearance on record as part of the January 1966 session for the drummer's eponymous album on ESP-Disk. The following year, having left Murray's group, he joined Frank Wright's quintet, and participated in the recording of Your Prayer, also for ESP-Disk. He also recorded his first album as a leader, an unreleased ESP-Disk project with a group that featured saxophonist Marion Brown and drummer Eddie Marshall, with original compositions that, according to Coursil, resembled those of Ornette Coleman. Recordings of his participation in a 1967 jam session with Laurence Cook, Warren Gale, Perry Robinson, and Steve Tintweiss were released in 2021 by the Inky Dot label with the title Ave B Free Jam.

Coursil also began rehearsing with Sun Ra's band (he recalled, "the saxophone section was so great, the best since Duke Ellington"), and joined Bill Dixon's University of the Streets orchestra as well as the Judith Dunn/Bill Dixon Company. Influenced by Dixon, he developed his own version of serialism, leading to the composition of Black Suite. In 1969, Coursil visited France, where he recorded two albums under his own name for BYG Records's Actuel series: Way Ahead, featuring saxophonist Arthur Jones, bassist Beb Guérin, and drummer Claude Delcloo, and a realization of Black Suite with Jones, Guérin, and Delcloo plus Anthony Braxton on contrabass clarinet and Burton Greene on piano. He also played on Greene's Actuel album Aquariana. Upon his return to New York, Coursil taught French and mathematics at the United Nations International School, where one of his students was John Zorn.

== Academic career and hiatus from music ==
In 1975, Coursil departed for France, where he resumed his studies, leading to an Ph.D. in linguistics in 1977, and a second Ph.D. in applied science in 1992, both from the University of Caen, where he also taught literature, linguistics, and philosophy of language. During these years, aside from occasional gigs with pianist François Tusques, Coursil abstained from performing in public. In 1995, he accepted a teaching position at the University of the West Indies in Martinique. Over the coming years, he established a reputation as an expert in the literature of Édouard Glissant as well as Saussurean linguistics, and published a book titled La fonction muette du langage: Essai de linguistique générale contemporaine (The Silent Function of Language: Essay in General Contemporary Linguistics) (2000). From 2002-2005, Coursil was a visiting professor of Francophone Literature and Cultures and Postcolonial Critique at Cornell University. While at Cornell, he published a number of scholarly articles on postcolonialism, Négritude, and writers Wole Soyinka and Maryse Condé. During his time in the United States, he also taught at the University of California, Irvine.

== Return to music and later life ==
Coursil recalled that, during his time away from performing in public, he "practiced trumpet like a painter trying to find his colors." He reflected: "The music was still there... I never left the instrument. It was part of my well-being, my breathing. If I don't have a trumpet I might just have a stroke. So I kept on playing. It's like a subterranean river that suddenly reaches the surface." In 2004, at a studio in a wooded area near Cornell, and with the encouragement of John Zorn, he recorded Minimal Brass, an album of multiple, overdubbed trumpet parts on which he employed circular breathing, a technique he learned from fellow trumpeter Jimmy Owens before leaving New York. The album was released in 2005 by Zorn's Tzadik Records.

Minimal Brass was followed by an oratorio titled Clameurs, recorded in Martinique in 2006 and released by Universal Music France the following year. The work, which employs spoken texts accompanied by trumpet and percussion, as well as choral passages, is based on writings by Martinicans such as Frantz Fanon, Monchoachi, and Édouard Glissant, as well as the pre-Islamic poet Antar. In 2008 and 2009, Coursil worked on the recording of Trails of Tears, a composition which dealt with the forced relocation of Native Americans during the 1800s. On the album, which was released in 2010, he was reunited with Sunny Murray and other associates from his New York days. In 2014, he recorded FreeJazzArt (Sessions for Bill Dixon) with bassist Alan Silva, and in 2020, he finalized the recording of a work that had been in progress since 2018, titled Hostipitality Suite.

In 2015, Coursil published a book titled Valeurs pures: le paradigme sémiotique de Ferdinand de Saussure (Pure Values: The Semiotic Paradigm Of Ferdinand De Saussure). In 2017, he was awarded the Édouard Glissant Prize for his entire body of work. He died in Belgium on June 26, 2020.

== Discography ==
=== As leader or co-leader ===
- Way Ahead (BYG, 1969)
- Black Suite (BYG, 1971)
- Minimal Brass (Tzadik, 2005)
- Clameurs (Universal Music France, 2007)
- Trails of Tears (Universal Music France, 2010)
- FreeJazzArt (Sessions for Bill Dixon) (RogueArt, 2014)
- Hostipitality Suite (Savvy, 2020)
- Ave B Free Jam (Inky Dot, 1967 [2021]) with Laurence Cook, Warren Gale, Perry Robinson, and Steve Tintweiss

With Burton Greene

- Aquariana (BYG, 1969)

With Sunny Murray

- Sunny Murray (ESP-Disk, 1966)

With Rocé

- Identité en crescendo (Emarcy, 2008)

With Frank Wright

- Your Prayer (ESP-Disk, 1967)
- The Complete ESP-Disk Recordings (ESP-Disk, 2005)
