= First World Alliance =

The First World Alliance was founded in 1977 by Kefa Nephthys (Lucille Jones) and Bill Jones. They met with Dr. Yosef Ben-Jochannan, a.k.a. “Dr. Ben,” after seeing him on Gil Noble's Like It Is, which was televised on ABC in New York City. They are quoted as saying that Dr. Ben gave them some books to read. After reading the books they started meeting with Dr. Ben for a Saturday study group. After studying with Dr. Ben they started the First World Alliance as a community education forum. They would invite various guest scholars and speakers to the forum, which became a weekly forum on Saturdays, as a service to the community known as the First World Alliance at Mt Zion Lutheran Church at 421 West 145th Street in New York City. Kefa Nephthys Jones, in an interview with the Amsterdam News, is quoted as saying, “When people have knowledge-of-self, they gain power-of-self … then they realize who they are, what they can do and what they have done in the past".

The First World Alliance introduced their audiences to works of African American and African Diaspora scholars such as Dr. Yosef Ben-Jochannan, Dr. John Henrik Clarke, Dr. Marimba Ani, Dr. Richard King, Dr. Asa Hilliard, Dr. Ivan Van Sertima, Dr. Frances Cress Welsing, Dr. Amos Wilson, Professor George Simmons, and others. It became an alternative education community forum in Harlem for decades.

== See also ==
- First World Alliance
- Harlem History street corner scholarship
- Street Universities
