= Arthur Jones (saxophonist) =

American musician (1940–1998)

Arthur Jones (1940–1998) was an American free jazz alto saxophonist. His sound has been described as "warm, almost sweet, with hints of Johnny Hodges and Cannonball Adderley around the edges".

== Biography ==
Jones was born in Cleveland, Ohio, to Adele (née Gordon) and James Edward Jones. His mother's family came from the west-central Alabama Black Belt area around Selma, while his father had migrated north from near Lewisburg, Tennessee. Jones had a younger brother, Ernest, who played tenor saxophone.

After playing for several years in a rock and roll band, Arthur Jones discovered music by Ornette Coleman and Eric Dolphy. He started appearing on the New York scene, playing in Frank Wright's group, with whom he made his recording debut on the album Your Prayer (1967).

In 1968 Jones was a member of Sunny Murray's Acoustical Swing Unit, with which he went to Paris in the summer of 1969. There, he worked together with several musicians released by BYG Records, including Jacques Coursil, Archie Shepp, and Burton Greene. In August 1969, Jones recorded two albums which appeared in BYG's Actuel series: Africanasia, as a co-leader together with drummer Claude Delcloo, and with several musicians from the Art Ensemble of Chicago, released in 1969; and Scorpio, a trio album together with Delcloo and bassist Beb Guérin, released in 1971.

Jones died in New York City.

== Discography ==
=== As leader/co-leader ===
- Africanasia (BYG Actuel, 1969); with Joseph Jarman, Roscoe Mitchell, Kenneth Terroade (flutes); Malachi Favors, Earl Freeman, Clifford Thornton (percussion); Claude Delcloo (drums)
- Scorpio (BYG Actuel, 1969 [1971]); with Beb Guérin (bass) and Claude Delcloo (drums)

=== As sideman ===
- Frank Wright, Your Prayer (ESP-Disk, 1967)
- Dave Burrell, Echo (BYG, 1969)
- Jacques Coursil, Way Ahead, (BYG, 1969)
- Jacques Coursil, Black Suite (BYG, 1969 [1971])
- Burton Greene, Aquariana (BYG, 1969)
- Sunny Murray, Homage to Africa (BYG, 1969 [1970])
- Sunny Murray, Sunshine (BYG, 1969)
- Archie Shepp, Yasmina, a Black Woman (BYG, 1969)
- Clifford Thornton, Ketchaoua (BYG, 1969)
- Archie Shepp, Bijou (Musica, 1975 [1976])
