= Yosef Ben-Jochannan =

American historian & writer (1918–2015)

Yosef Alfredo Antonio Ben-Jochannan
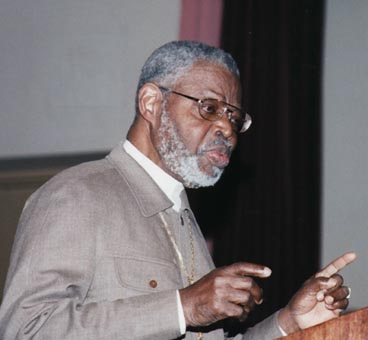
- Ben-Jochannan lecturing in Brooklyn, c. 1990s
- Born: December 31, 1918; Claimed by Yosef Ben-Jochannan to be Gondar, Ethiopian Empire and by others to be Puerto Rico
- Died: March 19, 2015 (aged 96); Bay Park Nursing Home, Bronx, New York City, U.S.
- Occupations: Writer, historian
- Writing career
- Pen name: Dr. Ben
- Subject: Egyptology
- Notable works: Black Man of the Nile and His Family
- Notable awards: Honorary doctoral degree: Sojourner–Douglass College (Baltimore), Medgar Evers College (Brooklyn), Marymount College (Manhattan)
- Movement: Afrocentrism

Yosef Alfredo Antonio Ben-Jochannan (/ˈbɛn ˈjoʊkənən/; December 31, 1918 – March 19, 2015), commonly referred to as "Dr. Ben", was an American writer and historian. He was considered to be one of the more prominent Afrocentric scholars by some Black Nationalists. Conversely, mainstream scholars, such as Mary Lefkowitz, dismissed him citing historical inaccuracies in his work, and disputes about his academic credentials.

== Early life and education ==
Ben-Jochannan claimed to have been born in Ethiopia to a Puerto Rican mother of Yemeni Jewish origin and an Ethiopian Jewish father. Conversely, it has been speculated that he was ethnically Puerto Rican.

In March 2015, following his death, The New York Times reported, "[T]here is little evidence for that other than his own word; some peers, and even a family member, have privately expressed doubts."

Ben-Jochannan's academic record is disputed, with claims he was educated variously in Puerto Rico, Brazil, Cuba, or Spain, earning degrees in either engineering and/or anthropology. In 1938, he is said to have earned a BS in Civil Engineering at the University of Puerto Rico; this is disputed as the registrar has no record of his attendance. He stated that in 1939 he earned a master's degree in Architectural Engineering from the University of Havana, Cuba. He also claimed to have earned doctoral degrees (PhD) in Cultural Anthropology and Moorish History from the University of Havana and the University of Barcelona, Spain, respectively, and advanced degrees from Cambridge University in England. Both Barcelona and Cambridge say that he never received a degree from either university and, furthermore, Cambridge University said it had no record of Ben-Jochannan ever attending any classes there.

According to his obituary, Ben-Jochannan holds honorary doctoral degrees from Sojourner–Douglass College (Baltimore), Marymount College (New York), and Medgar Evers College (Brooklyn).

The New York Times summarized the lifelong inconsistencies in his reported academic record:

Documents from Cornell University show Mr. Ben-Jochannan holding a doctorate from Cambridge University in England while, conversely, catalogs from Malcolm-King College list him as holding two master's degrees from Cambridge University. According to Fred Lewsey, a communications officer at Cambridge, however, the school has no record of his ever attending, let alone earning any degree. Similarly, the University of Puerto Rico Mayagüez, where he also said he had studied, has no records of his enrollment. Indeed, it appears that Mr. Ben-Jochannan consciously falsified much of his personal academic history.

== Career and later life ==
Accounts agree on little else other than that Ben-Jochannan was raised in the Caribbean and immigrated to the United States about 1940, where he reportedly worked as a draftsman and continued his studies. He later stated that in 1945, he was appointed chairman of the African Studies Committee at the headquarters of the newly founded UNESCO. He said he worked for them until 1970. However, UNESCO staff state that they have "no record of Mr. Ben-Jochannan ever having been employed by the United Nations." Ben-Jochannan also stated that he began teaching Egyptology at Malcolm-King College in Harlem in 1950, but this volunteer-run effort was not founded until 1968, when it started with 13 students. He later taught at the City College of New York. From 1973 to 1987, he was an adjunct professor at Cornell University.

In 1977, Ben-Jochannan met Lucille Jones (Kefa Nephthy) and Ben Jones. They formed a study group. After studying with Ben-Jochannan, Kefa and Ben Jones started the community lecture series called the First World Alliance.

Ben-Jochannan was the author of 49 books, primarily on ancient Nile Valley civilizations and their influence on Western cultures. In his writings, he asserts that the original Jews were from Ethiopia and were Africans. He says that the Semitic (Middle Eastern) Jews later adopted the Black Jewish faith and its customs. He further accused the Semitic Jews of using special powers to "manipulate and control the Mind of the World" and claimed that Holocaust education is a form of brainwashing.

According to his obituary, Ben-Jochannan began his educational teaching in Harlem in 1967 at HARYOU-ACT. He worked as an adjunct professor (1973–1987) at Cornell University in the Africana Studies and Research Center, then directed by James Turner. Ben-Jochannan also taught at other institutions, including Rutgers University. In 1977 he accepted an honorary faculty position with the Israelite Rabbinical Academy at Beth Shalom Hebrew Congregation in Brooklyn. (See Capers Funnye.) Ben-Jochannan appeared several times on Gil Noble's WABC-TV weekly public affairs series Like It Is.

During his career in the 1980s, Ben-Jochannan was well known for leading guided tours to the Nile Valley. Ben-Jochannan's 15-day trips to Egypt, billed as "Dr. Ben's Alkebu-Lan Educational Tours," using what he said was an ancient name for Africa, typically ran three times a summer, shuttling as many as 200 people to Africa per season.

Ben-Jochannan earned the respect of a later generation of black intellectuals. Cornel West said he "was blessed to study at his feet." Ta-Nehisi Coates, the son of Ben-Jochannan's publisher, praised him for teaching that history "is not this objective thing that exists outside of politics... It exists well within politics, and part of its job has been to position black people in a place of use for white people".

In 2002, Ben-Jochannan donated his library of more than 35,000 volumes, manuscripts and ancient scrolls to the Nation of Islam. In the years before his death, Ben-Jochannan lived in the Harlem section of Manhattan in New York City, in an apartment complex known as Lenox Terrace.

Ben-Jochannan married three times and had a total of 13 children. He died on March 19, 2015, at the age of 96. at the Bay Park Nursing Home in the Bronx.

== Accusations of teaching pseudohistory ==
Ben-Jochannan has been accused of distorting history and promoting Black supremacy. In February 1993, Wellesley College European classics professor Mary Lefkowitz publicly confronted Ben-Jochannan about his teachings. Ben-Jochannan taught that Aristotle visited the Library of Alexandria. During the question and answer session following the lecture, Lefkowitz asked Ben-Jochannan, "How would that have been possible, when the library was not built until after his death?" Ben-Jochannan replied that the dates were uncertain. Lefkowitz writes that Ben-Jochannan proceeded to tell those present that "they could and should believe what only Black instructors told them" and "that although they might think that Jews were all 'hook-nosed and sallow faced,' there were other Jews who looked Black like himself."

African-American professor Clarence E. Walker wrote that Ben-Jochannan not only confused Cleopatra VII with her daughter Cleopatra VIII and stated she was black, but also wrote that "Cleopatra VIII committed suicide after being discovered in a plot with Marc Antonio [Mark Anthony] to murder Julius Caesar." This would be highly problematic, considering Julius Caesar was assassinated 14 years before Cleopatra VII's suicide.

== Atheism ==
In his lecture "Why do you Believe in God" Ben-Jochanan explicitly stated his disbelief in God. He declared Judeo-Christian-Islamic figures and stories (like Adam and Eve) were based on African and Asian mythology. On the subject of Churches, he argued: "The churches can’t help the people when the chips are down because their interest is with the power structure."

Ben-Jochanan also stated: "I say the Black man has called upon Jesus Christ for so many years here in America, and now he starts calling on Mohammed and there are many who are calling on Moses, and at no time within this period has the Black man's situation changed, nor has the Black man any freedom. It is obvious that someone didn't hear his call or isn't interested in that call—either Jesus, Moses, or Mohammed."

== Selected bibliography ==
- African Origins of Major Western Religions, 1991. ISBN 978-0-933121-29-4
- We the Black Jews, 1993. ISBN 978-0-933121-40-9
- Black Man of the Nile and His Family, Black Classic Press, 1989. ISBN 978-0-933121-26-3
- Africa: Mother of Western Civilization. ISBN 978-0-933121-25-6
- New Dimensions in African History. ISBN 978-0-86543-226-0
- The Myth of Exodus and Genesis and the Exclusion of Their African Origins. ISBN 978-0-933121-76-8
- Abu Simbel to Ghizeh: A Guide Book and Manual, 1989. ISBN 978-0-933121-27-0
- Cultural Genocide in the Black and African Studies Curriculum. New York, 1972. OCLC 798725
- The Alkebulanians of Ta-Merry's "Mysteries System" and the Ritualization of the Late Bro. Kwesie Adebisi. 1981. ASIN B005FY5CQS

== See also ==
- List of notable Puerto Ricans
- Institute for the Study of Academic Racism
- African diaspora
- Egyptology
