= Black Suite =

Studio album by Jacques Coursil
- Released: 1971
- Recorded: June 10, 1969
- Studio: Paris
- Genre: Jazz
- Labels: BYG Records; 529.349
- Producers: Jean Georgakarakos, Jean Luc Young

Jacques Coursil chronology
Way Ahead (1969)	Black Suite (1971)	Minimal Brass (2005)

Black Suite is an album by trumpeter and composer Jacques Coursil. It was recorded in Paris in June 1969, and was released in 1971 by BYG Records as part of their Actuel series. On the album, Coursil is joined by saxophonist Arthur Jones, contrabass clarinetist Anthony Braxton, pianist Burton Greene, bassist Beb Guérin, and drummer Claude Delcloo.

== Reception ==
Professional ratings
Review scores
Source	Rating
AllMusic	4.5/5 stars

In a review for AllMusic, Eugene Chadbourne wrote: "As kind of the lost voice of the trumpet in modern jazz, Coursil is not only a great discovery for the modern jazz fan, but a fine creative vintage that holds up to repeat visits over the years. His control of the difficult horn and totally original melodic thinking really makes his playing stand out among the admittedly thin ranks of avant-garde trumpet players. None of the players who have Coursil's technical mastery play with as much heart and soul." He concluded that the album "is one of the best examples of just how beautiful modern jazz can be."

Cam Scott, writing for Music & Literature, called the album "spacious and contemplative," and commented: "the player's voices feel almost completely independent of one another, detachable from the whole, and they interact as such throughout, forming any number of collaborative modules. Beb Guérin's bowing drones heavily below the purr of Braxton's clarinet, recalling the highly textural music of Giacinto Scelsi, as Coursil sputters a series of athematic fanfares throughout."

In an article for the London Review of Books, Adam Shatz stated that the album demonstrates the fact that Coursil "was fascinated by the relations between sound and silence, density and sparseness – and by the possibility of creating complex new forms that blurred the line between notation and improvisation."

Todd S. Jenkins remarked: "Braxton's presence seems to be inspirational to everyone, since Jones rises to the occasion admirably and Greene holds onto the reedman's coattails to great effect. Coursil reaches his pinnacle as a trumpeter, crafting original melodic phrases out of thin air that few others could have imagined."

== Track listing ==
Composed by Jacques Coursil.

1. "Black Suite - Part 1" – 18:00
2. "Black Suite - Part 2" – 13:00

== Personnel ==
- Jacques Coursil – trumpet
- Arthur Jones – alto saxophone
- Anthony Braxton – contrabass clarinet
- Burton Greene – piano
- Beb Guérin – bass
- Claude Delcloo – drums
