= Hostipitality Suite =

Studio album by Jacques Coursil
- Released: 2020
- Recorded: 2020
- Studio: Baillard Studio
- Genre: Jazz
- Label: Savvy Records; SR001
- Producer: Abhishek Nilamber, Olani Ewunnet

Jacques Coursil chronology
FreeJazzArt (Sessions for Bill Dixon) (2014)	Hostipitality Suite (2020)	Ave B Free Jam (2021)

Hostipitality Suite is an album by trumpeter and composer Jacques Coursil. The album, Coursil's last, was recorded at Baillard Studio in 2020, and was pressed on June 26 of that year, the day of his death. It was released on LP later in 2020 by Savvy Records. On the recording, Coursil's trumpet is heard over a synthesized backdrop prepared and arranged by Jeff Baillard. Coursil also recites texts by Jacques Derrida, Emmanuel Levinas, and Édouard Glissant.

The recording came about as a result of an invitation for Coursil to participate in a 2018 art exhibition titled "Whose Land Have I Lit on Now? Contemplations on the Notions of Hostipitality" at the Savvy Contemporary gallery in Berlin. The project was an attempt to reflect on the relationships between hostility and hospitality as discussed in the writings of Jacques Derrida, specifically his 1996 book Of Hospitality.

== Reception ==
In an article for the London Review of Books, Adam Shatz stated that the work's "austerity invites us to reflect on its subject matter: the condition of the foreigner in a new land by turns welcoming and hostile." He wrote: "Germany had recently accepted more than a million refugees... and the generous welcome they received... was already tarnished by xenophobic hostility. Provisional hospitality, Coursil warns, leaves the applicant at the mercy of 'the country that welcomes or excludes him'. A utopian vision of 'absolute hospitality', on the other hand, can only be imagined 'from another place, a margin, a periphery'. Coursil dedicated his life to cultivating that margin."

David Grundy, writing for Point of Departure, commented: "Rather than imagining that any artform... can adequately capture the entirety of the historical burdens with which he's concerned, Coursil's music instead encourages us to think of the historical absences and gaps, the absence of adequate expression for that which is excluded from the Enlightenment narratives Western society tells itself... this is a patient music that requires one to fully suspend expectations of development, progress or momentum... Coursil's music is also comfortable with a kind of marginal or peripheral claim on attention, in which the listener might be asked... to enter into a mood of contemplation in which attention may wander or focus into shards of emotional intensity." Grundy concluded by calling the album "a fitting farewell."

In a review for The New York City Jazz Record, Andrey Henkin described the album as "an elusive listen, atmospheric and non-linear, introspective and abstract," and wrote: "listening to it one hears something floating and omnipresent, not tethered to grooves or emanating from speakers... we are left on our own to determine what Coursil meant: was he the stranger, a philosopher among musicians, a trumpeter among academics? Is strangeness/foreignness ultimately a relative concept? This amorphous quality extends to the music as the notes, words and electric washes move in and out of the foreground. In both music and language, living things changing over time, there are no final statements."

== Track listing ==
Composed by Jacques Coursil.

1. "Untitled" – 19:42
2. "Untitled" – 18:10

== Personnel ==
- Jacques Coursil – trumpet, voice
- Jeff Baillard – arrangements, synthesizers
