= Perry Robinson =

American musician (1938–2018)

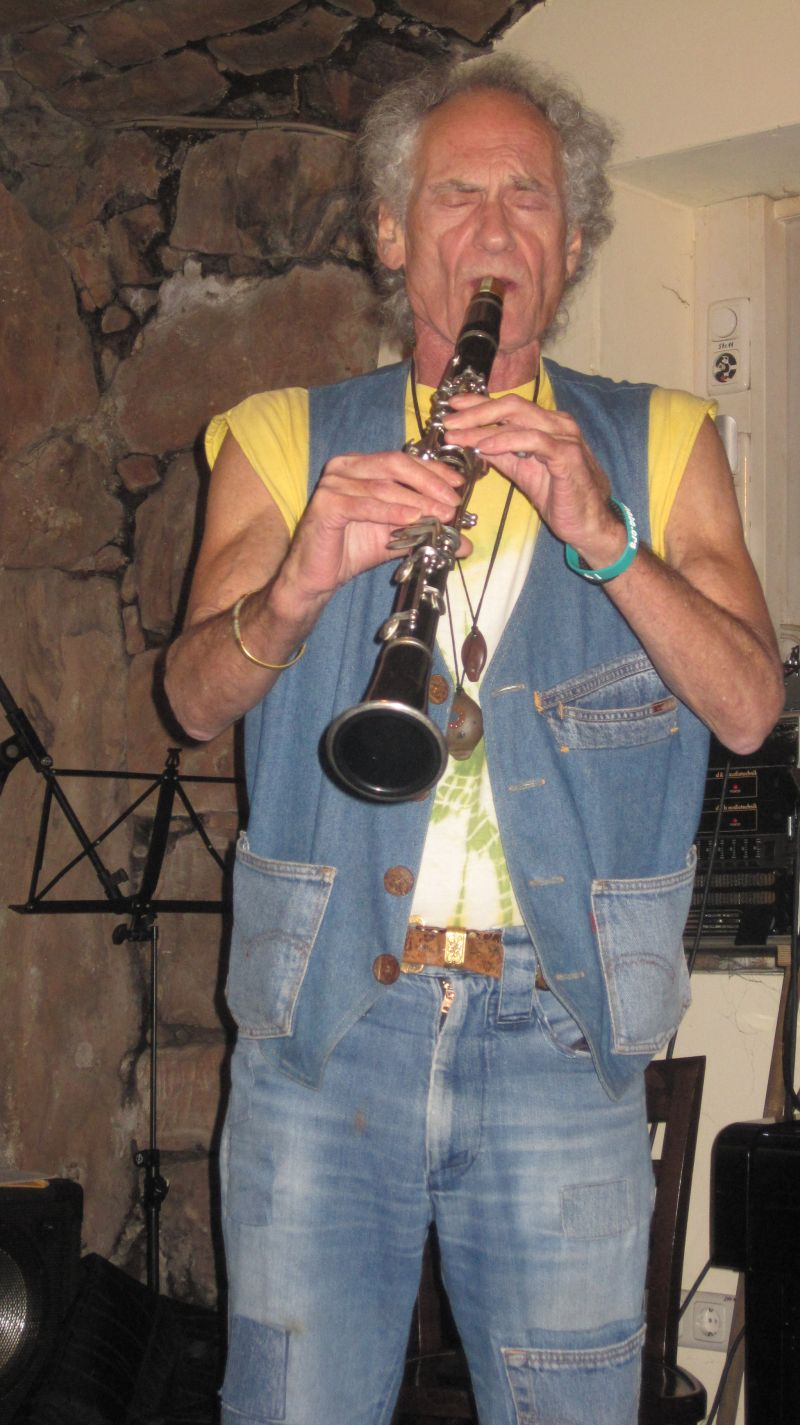

Perry Morris Robinson (September 17, 1938 – December 2, 2018) was an American jazz clarinetist and composer. He was the son of composer Earl Robinson.

== Early life and education ==
Robinson was born and grew up in New York City. He attended the Lenox School of Jazz in Massachusetts in mid-1959.

== Career ==
Robinson served in a U.S. military band in the early-1960s. His first record, Funk Dumpling (with Kenny Barron, Henry Grimes, and Paul Motian) was recorded by Savoy in 1962. He also appeared with Grimes on The Call in 1965, on the ESP-Disk label (ESP 1026). Although the album is credited to "Henry Grimes Trio" the album liner notes, written by ESP-Disk label head Bernard Stollman, stated: "[Grimes] chose Perry Robinson, a virtuoso who merits far wider recognition, to pair with, and this recording reflects both of their contributions, in equal measure. A more accurate title for the album would be Henry Grimes/Perry Robinson." Two of the album's six songs are credited to Robinson, including the title track.

From 1973, Robinson worked with Jeanne Lee and Gunter Hampel's Galaxie Dream Band. He contributed to Dave Brubeck' s Two Generations of Brubeck, and played with Burton Greene' s Dutch klezmer band, Klezmokum. He was the featured clarinetist on Archie Shepp's LP Mama Too Tight on the Impulse! label. He led his own groups in performances and on record, with albums on the Chiaroscuro, WestWind, and Timescraper labels. More recently, he worked with William Parker and Walter Perkins on Bob's Pink Cadillac and several discs on the CIMP label.

From 1975 until 1977, Robinson was a member of the Clarinet Contrast group, which featured German clarinet players Theo Jörgensmann and Bernd Konrad. He recorded with Lou Grassi as a member of his PoBand since the late Nineties, and with Lou Grassi, Wayne Lopes and Luke Faust in The Jug Jam, an improvisational jug band. He plays in a free jazz and world music trio along with tabla player Badal Roy and bassist Ed Schuller, with whom he recorded the CD Raga Roni. He played with Darius Brubeck and Muruga Booker in the MBR jazz trio. Robinson also played an integral part in the formation of Cosmic Legends, an improvisational music/performance group led by composer/pianist Sylvie Degiez which included musicians Rashied Ali, Wayne Lopes, Hayes Greenfield, and Michael Hashim. In 2005 he was featured on his cousin Jeffrey Lewis' album City and Eastern Songs on Rough Trade Records, produced by Kramer. A later release was OrthoFunkOlogy in 2008 with the band Free Funk, also featuring Muruga Booker, Badal Roy, Richie Shakin' Nagan and Shakti Ma Booker.

His autobiography, Perry Robinson: The Traveler (co-authored by Florence F. Wetzel), was published in 2002.

== Personal life ==
Robinson died in Jersey City, New Jersey, in December 2018, at the age of 80.

== Discography ==
=== As leader or co-leader ===
- 1962: Funk Dumpling (Savoy)
- 1978: Kundalini (Improvising Artists)
- 1978: The Traveler (Chiaroscuro)
- 1989: Nightmare Island: Live at the Leverkusener Jazztage (West Wind)
- 1990: Call to the Stars (West Wind)
- 1998: Angelology (Timescraper)
- 2003: Still Traveling (WestWind)
- 2005: Children's Song (Konnex) (Recorded in 1990)
- 2005: The Gone Orchestra Presents: Perry Robinson and the Eternal Flame (Mahaffay Musical Archives)
- 2009: Two Voice in the Desert with Burton Greene (Tzadik)
- 2010: Mystic Overflow with Muruga Booker (Sagittarius/Qbico)
- 2021: Ave B Free Jam (Inky Dot Media) recorded in 1967
- 2023: Stop Time: Live at Prince Street, 1978 with Barry Altschul and David Izenzon (NoBusiness) recorded in 1978

=== As sideman ===
- The Call – Henry Grimes (ESP-Disk, 1965)
- Mouvement – Patrick Favre and Perry Robinson (Bleu Regard, 1966)
- Mama Too Tight – Archie Shepp (Impulse!, 1966)
- Bunky & Jake – Bunky and Jake (Mercury, 1968)
- It Crawled into My Hand, Honest – The Fugs (Reprise, 1968)
- L.A.M.F. – Bunky and Jake (Kiribati Productions, 1969)
- Liberation Music Orchestra – Charlie Haden (1969)
- Jake & The Family Jewels – Jake & The Family Jewels (Polydor, 1970)
- Jazz Composers Orchestra: Escalator over the Hill – (JCOA, November 1968 – June 1971)
- I'm The One – Annette Peacock (RCA, 1972)
- Impulsively! – Various Artists (Impulse!, 1972)
- Numatik Swing Band – Roswell Rudd & Jazz Composer's Orchestra (JCOA, 1973)
- Conspiracy – Jeanne Lee (1974)
- Brother, the Great Spirit Made Us All – Dave Brubeck (Atlantic, 1974)
- Poum – Composers Collektive (Perry Robinson, John Fischer (pianist), Mark Whitecage, Laurence Cook, Mario Pavone) (1974)
- Secret Sauce – Skyking (Columbia, 1975)
- Interface – John Fischer (with Mark Whitecage, Perry Robinson Armen Halburian, Rick Kilburn, John Shea, Jay Clayton & Laurence Cook) (1975)
- Live at Environ – John Fischer (with Perry Robinson & Rick Kilburn) (1975)
- Echoes of Prayer – Grachan Moncur III & Jazz Composer's Orchestra (JCOA, 1975)
- Environ Days – John Fischer (with Lester Bowie, Perry Robinson, Charles Tyler, Marion Brown, Arthur Blythe & Phillip Wilson) (recorded 1970s, released 1991)
- I Wanna Play for You – Stanley Clarke (Sony, 1977)
- It Just So Happens – Ray Anderson (Enja, 1978)
- You Better Fly Away – Clarinet Summit (with John Carter, Gianluigi Trovesi, Theo Jörgensmann, Bernd Konrad, Ernst-Ludwig Petrowsky, Didier Lockwood, Stan Tracey, Eje Thelin, Kai Kanthak, Jean-François Jenny-Clark, Günter "Baby" Sommer, Aldo Romano) (1979)
- Mr. Playdough Man – Cool and the Clones, Ejaz (cassette) – 1979 – 1983
- Celestial Glory – Gunter Hampel & His Galaxie Dream Band (1981)
- Inscapes – Gunter Hampel, Birth (video)
- Live in Eastern Europe – John Fischer (1983)
- Licorice Factory – Licorice Factory (1986)
- Songs of the Working People – (Flying Fish, 1988)
- Materialized Perception – German Clarinet Duo (1992)
- Jew–azzic Park – Klezmokum (1994)
- PoGressions – Lou Grassi (1995)
- ReJew–Venation – Klezmokum (1998)
- Pushin' 30 – Eli Yamin, (Yamin Music, 1998)
- The Best of Kilopop! – Chris Butler, (Future Fossil Music, 2000)
- PoZest – Marshall Allen (CIMP, 2000)
- New Prohibition: A Music History of Hemp (Various Artists) (Viper, 2001)
- Klezmokum: Le Dor Va Dor – (BVHAAST, 2001)
- Bob's Pink Cadillac – William Parker Clarinet Trio (Eremite, 2002)
- ComPOsed – Lou Grassi's PoBand/John Tchicai (2002)
- Buzzy Linhart Presents the Big Few (2003) – Buzzy Linhart
- Kundalini Rhapsody – Muruga Booker, Dr. Dennis Chernin, & Perry Robinson (2003)
- One Global Village – Global Village Ceremonial Band (Qbico, 2005)
- Honeysuckle Dog – Chris Smither (Okra–tone, 2004)
- Invisible Cities – Steve Swell/Perry Robinson 2004
- Rarum XV – Carla Bley (ECM, 2004)
- Holy Ghost: Rare & Unissued Recordings (1962–70) (Revenant, 2004)
- Children Song – Children Song (Konnex, 2005)
- Free Funk (Qbico, 2005)
- Carnival Skin – Perry Robinson, Peter Evans, Bruce Eisenbeil, Hilliard Greene, Klaus Kugel (Nemu, 2005)
- Impulse Story – Archie Shepp (Impulse!, 2006)
- Still Travelling – (West Wind, 2006)
- First Blues – Allen Ginsberg – (Water, 2006)
- Muruga & The Global Village Ceremonial Band (Qbico, 2005)
- House That Trane Built: Story of Impulse Records – Various Artists (Impulse!, 2006)
- The Soul in the Mist – Andrea Centazzo, Perry Robinson & Nobu Stowe (Ictus, 2007)
- Hommage an Klaus Kinski – Nobu Stowe–Lee Pembleton Project (Soul Note, 2007)
- A Long Story – Anat Fort (ECM, 2007)
- Ancestors, Mindreles, Nagila Monsters – Klez–Edge (Tzadik, 2008)
- OrthoFunkOlogy – Free Funk (Musart, 2008)
- Three Neighbours – (Gerald Achee, Perry Robinson and Joel Chassan, 2009)
- Trails of Tears – Jacques Coursil (Sunnyside, 2010)
- Live at Sage Court Studio – Muruga-Robinson Ensemble (Musart, 2014)
- Fathership – Mothership World Connection – Muruga and the Cosmic Hoedown Band meet George Clinton and P-Funk All-Stars (Musart, 2015)
- @ The Wormhole Cafe – Wormhole Cafe (Musart, 2016)
- Essence – Perry Robinson & Muruga Booker (Musart, 2016)
- Night Shift — Rick Jacobi (Musart, 2017)
- Clarinet Summit – Theo Jörgensmann, Gianluigi Trovesi, Bernd Konrad, Annette Maye, Sebastian Gramss, Albrecht Maurer and Günter Sommer (Jazzwerkstatt, 2017).
- The N.Y. Clarinet Society- Coco - w/ Michael Marcus & Jay Rosen (FSR Records, 2022)
