= A Great Night in Harlem =

Annual concert

A Great Night in Harlem Benefit Concert is an annual series of concerts organized by the Jazz Foundation of America (JFA), a 501(c)(3) non-profit organization, since 2001 to raise money for the Jazz Foundation's Musician Emergency Fund.

== Founding ==
In August 2000, after being hired as executive director of the Jazz Foundation, Wendy Oxenhorn discovered the organization had only US$7,000 left in the fund. She suggested organizing a fundraising concert at the Apollo Theater. When she was told they could not afford to rent the Apollo, Oxenhorn asked board member Jarrett Lilien for advice. Lilien told Oxenhorn he would pay to rent the Apollo.

Oxenhorn conceived of the idea for the concerts during her first year as executive director of the JFA in 2000, after watching a 1994 documentary called A Great Day in Harlem about jazz musicians. The first concert, which took place in September 2001, raised $350,000 for the foundation's Jazz Musicians Emergency Fund, and over 65 jazz artists performed. The Foundation's emergency caseload had tripled and they were helping 150 musicians. Lauren Roberts joined the organization and together they ran it, handling an average of 10 cases a day. Because of the success of the A Great Night in Harlem, they initiated the Jazz in the Schools Program, which generated employment for more than 400 elderly musicians in New York City.

The annual A Great Night in Harlem concerts were the organization's only major funding source. Lilien and his partners at E-Trade started the Musicians Emergency Housing Fund, which enabled the Jazz Foundation to pay rents and keep mortgages from foreclosure. The Jazz Foundation of America supported hundreds of elderly musicians. Jarrett Lilien became the first president of the JFA. Within months, he was made president of E-Trade. By 2009, the Jazz Foundation handled approximately 500 emergency cases a year.

== Concerts 2001–2010 ==
On Monday, September 24, 2001, the JFA presented the first A Great Night in Harlem at the Apollo Theater on 125th Street and Adam Clayton Powell Boulevard, at 7 p.m. The performance was hosted by Bill Cosby and Gil Noble of Like It Is.

On September 26, 2002, the JFA hosted the second annual fund-raising concert, again at the Apollo Theater in Harlem. Performers included George Benson, Pete Cosey, Jim Hall, Danny Moore, Joe Piscopo. Bill Cosby presented awards to Jack McConnell and Congressman John Conyers. Skitch Henderson presented the Lifetime Achievement Award to Clark Terry and Abbey Lincoln, and Billy Taylor presented the Humanitarian Award to Jimmy Owens. Bill Cosby and Joe Piscopo were the Masters of Ceremonies. The 2002 concert honored Clark Terry and Congressman John Conyers. In 2002, the recording of the 2001 A Great Night in Harlem concert was released. Profits went to the Jazz Foundation of America's Jazz Musicians' Emergency Fund.

On September 26, 2003, at the Apollo Theater, the third Annual Great Night in Harlem concert was held. The 2003 benefit was hosted by Bill Cosby, Chevy Chase, Whoopi Goldberg, and Branford Marsalis. The concert featured performances by Irene Reid with Don Milletello, Randy Johnston, Billy Phipps and Tootsie Bean. George Wein and Bill Cosby presented the Saint of Jazz Award to Harry Elias of JVC America. A surprise award was presented to Bill Cosby by Leo Corbie, Chairman of the Jazz Foundation of America, and Quincy Jones. A Lifetime Achievement Award was given to Jimmy Heath.

The fourth A Great Night in Harlem concert was hosted by the JFA on October 28, 2004. The 2004 benefit concert featured appearances by MCs Bill Cosby, Quincy Jones, Gil Noble, and Mario Van Peebles with his son Melvin Van Peebles. Among the featured performers were Johnny Blowers, Larry Lucie, Max Lucas, Jimmy McGriff, Danny Mixon. Bill Cosby and Clark Terry presented a "surprise" award to Quincy Jones. Jones introduced the tribute to Ray Charles, arranged by Al Jackson; Kenny Barron and Regina Carter played "Georgia on My Mind". A tribute to African drummer Babatunde Olatunji was performed by Sanga of The Valley, Shawn Banks, Gary Fritz, Gabu, Daoud, Seku, Tonge, John Ward, Checharp, Aba Shaini, and Bas.

The fifth A Great Night in Harlem concert was hosted by the Jazz Foundation of America on May 4, 2006. The 2006 benefit concert was hosted by Bill Cosby, Danny Glover, and Billy Taylor and featured performances by Seth Farber, Harold Mabern, the New Birth Brass Band, Odetta, and James Blood Ulmer.

The sixth A Great Night in Harlem fundraiser concert was held on May 17, 2007, at the Apollo Theater, hosted by Bill Cosby, Danny Glover, and Gil Noble. The concert's theme was "A History of the Music". Performers included Patti Bown Davell Crawford, Dr. John, Duke Ellington Orchestra, and Jimmy Norman.

The seventh concert was hosted on May 29, 2008. The Masters of Ceremonies were Bill Cosby, Danny Glover, and Chevy Chase. Performers included The Dave Brubeck Quartet, Frank Foster, Hank Jones, Norah Jones, Randy Weston, and Michael White. Awards were presented to Englewood Hospital & Medical Center, Claude Nobs, and Montreux Jazz Festival.

The eighth concert was hosted by the JFA on May 14, 2009. The event was hosted by The Sopranos' Michael Imperioli, Wendy Oxenhorn, and Dick Parsons. The concert was billed as a tribute to the blues. Performers included Gene Bertoncini, John Dee Holeman, Eric Lewis, Deacon John Moore, and Lou Reed.

The ninth concert was hosted by the Jazz Foundation of America on May 20, 2010. Great Night 2010 was hosted by Kevin Kline, Michael Imperioli, David Johansen, and Wendy Oxenhorn. The concert was billed A History of the Music and was dedicated to "The Spirit of Greatness". Performers included R. L. Boyce, Manno Charlemagne, and Baba Ola Jagun. Dick Parsons and Chevy Chase presented the Medicine for Music Award to Jay Nadel and Frank Forte of Englewood Hospital & Medical Center.

== Albums ==
A Great Night in Harlem was released as a 2-CD set that features solo and combo recordings of various jazz musicians during a benefit concert for the Jazz Musicians Emergency Relief Fund. Proceeds from the sale of this CD go to the fund. The album was recorded live at the Apollo Theater, New York, on September 24, 2001. It includes liner notes by Nat Hentoff. "Sunset & The Mockingbird" (Tommy Flanagan) was nominated for the 2003 Grammy Awards for Best Jazz Instrumental Solo.

A 21-CD set was released with performances by Kenny Barron, Randy Brecker, Regina Carter, Ron Carter, Lou Donaldson, Jimmy Owens, and Cassandra Wilson.
