= Clameurs =

Studio album by Jacques Coursil
- Released: 2007
- Recorded: Spring and summer 2006
- Studios: Fort-de-France, Martinique
- Genre: Jazz
- Labels: Universal Music France; 984 748 2
- Producers: Jacques Coursil, Jeff Baillard

Jacques Coursil chronology
Minimal Brass (2005)	Clameurs (2007)	Trails of Tears (2010)

Clameurs (Clamors) is an album by trumpeter and composer Jacques Coursil. It was recorded at Fort-de-France in Martinique in the spring and summer of 2006, with additional percussion tracks recorded in Paris and New York City, and was released in 2007 by Universal Music France.

== Overview ==
The album is centered around a large composition titled "Four Oratorios for Trumpet and Voice," using texts in Creole, French, and Arabic by four different poets, and composed for varying combinations of instruments and voices. The oratorios are preceded by a prologue titled "Paroles Nues" ("Naked Words") and followed by an epilogue titled "Cadences des Chaînes" ("Cadences of Chains"). Regarding the poems, Coursil wrote: "The slave's cry, the shout of the oppressed, strangles in his throat. If he cries out, he's beaten, dead – the shout is a free man's privilege. In the language of poets, the tight cry has been transformed into the written word." According to Coursil, the oratorios attempt to "restore the world-cry of these poets in their own tongues... this clamour is neither a lament nor hatred. The trumpet hears and breathes naked words. It is a mouth-drum, the instrument of appeal."

The first oratorio, titled "Monchoachi, Wélélé Nou (Nos Clameurs)" ("Our clamors"), is based on Creole and French texts by the Martinican writer Monchoachi. Coursil described his poetry as a "raucous we-le-le" (a Creole word for clamor or uproar). The second oratorio, "Frantz Fanon 1952," uses excerpts from the Martinican poet's book Black Skin, White Masks. Coursil commented: "In 1952... Franon wrote: 'No! I have no right to come and shout my hatred...' 'The cry went out of my life a long time ago'."

"La Chanson d'Antar" ("The Song of Antar"), the third oratorio, is based on a poem by the pre-Islamic writer Antar, whose work was described by Coursil as "one of the most beautiful of Arab literature's Mu'allaqat (Hanging Poems). The fourth oratorio, "l'Archipel des Grands Chaos" ("The Archipelago of Great Chaos"), in two parts, uses texts by Martinican writer Edouard Glissant, who wrote: "The cry... is a fertile, rhythmical neurosis of silence – an aborted root – our voices sink into the earth, grounded without echo."

Regarding his playing on the album, Coursil, in a retrospective interview, stated: "I strongly like the noise of the world: cars, planes, people, stones falling down. I'm more interested in sound and timbres than in melody proper. If you listen to Clameurs, you see that the melody comes out of the sound: I don't play any phrases there or melodic motifs; I just play the sound, and the sound makes the melody."

== Reception ==
Professional ratings
Review scores
Source	Rating
AllMusic	3.5/5 stars
The Penguin Guide to Jazz	4/4 stars
All About Jazz	4/5 stars

The authors of the Penguin Guide to Jazz Recordings awarded the album 4 stars, calling it "an intense and often very moving sequence." They wrote: "If some of the rhetoric seems to belong to a past age, Coursil has kept faith with this philosophy and with a distinctive approach to brass improvisation for many decades. A demanding record, but emotionally rather than technically."

== Track listing ==
Composed by Jacques Coursil.

1. "Prologue - Paroles Nues" – 4:04
  2. "Monchoachi, Wélélé Nou (Nos Clameurs)" – 11:48
  3. "Frantz Fanon 1952" – 7:06
  4. "La Chanson d'Antar" – 6:02
  5. "Edouard Glissant, l'Archipel des Grands Chaos 'La Traite'" – 5:37
  6. "Edouard Glissant, l'Archipel des Grands Chaos 'Les Îles'" – 8:12
7. "Epilogue - Cadences des Chaînes" – 7:05

== Personnel ==
- Jacques Coursil – trumpet, voice
- Jeff Baillard – arrangements
- Alex Bernard – bass (tracks 2, 4–6)
- Mino Cinélu – percussion (tracks 2 and 7)
- Joby Bernabé – voice (track 2)
- Jean Obeid – voice (track 4)
- Yna Boulange, Aurélie Dalmat, Mylène Florentiny – chorus (tracks 5 and 6)
