= Trails of Tears =

Studio album by Jacques Coursil
- Released: 2010
- Recorded: 2007–2009
- Genre: Jazz
- Labels: Sunnyside; SSC 3085
- Producer: Bruno Guermonprez

Jacques Coursil chronology
Clameurs (2007)	Trails of Tears (2010)	FreeJazzArt (2014)

Trails of Tears is an album by trumpeter and composer Jacques Coursil. It was recorded during 2007–2009 in Martinique, France, and the United States, and was released in 2010 by Sunnyside Records and Universal Jazz.

The album deals with the forced migration of Indigenous North Americans during the early 1800s (the "Trail of Tears") as well as the transatlantic slave trade. Coursil conceived the piece during the 1970s when he visited the Sioux in South Dakota during the early stages of the American Indian Movement. Regarding his time there, Coursil stated: "I was deeply impressed by the seriousness of those people, who don't talk much. But when they say something, it's heavy. There are a lot of books about this, but that is nothing compared to people telling me things bit by bit. The musician always translates into music what they see and hear and smell and experience, so instead of making a theory out of it, I made music." He reflected: "The genocide of the [American] Indians is the history of the world... not just the history of the Indian or the black. The Middle Passage is not the story of black people; it's the story of the world... It's a common story, as much your story [or] my story."

== Reception ==
Professional ratings
Review scores
Source	Rating
All About Jazz	5/5 stars
DownBeat	2.5/5 stars

Raul d'Gama Rose of All About Jazz awarded the album 5 stars, calling it "a monumental undertaking and a major work," and writing: "This is Coursil's musical Way of the Cross, one that unfolds like a sharp angular liturgy that is sure to become part of the literature of the trumpet... Trails of Tears is the work of a musician with a magical, burnished horn, who stands head and shoulders above most trumpeters practicing their craft today."

Steve Greenlee of The Boston Globe included Trails of Tears in his article "Jazz's Top Albums of 2011," calling it "absolutely stunning." Stereophile's Jon Iverson stated: "This is one of the saddest, most beautiful records I've heard," and included it in his article titled "Records to Die For 2017."

John Murph, writing for DownBeat, commented: "Trails of Tears gets too fascinated with exposition and pays little attention to discernible narrative arc," but praised 'The Removal," stating that "the ensemble engages in heady dialogue... All of the musicians become more concerned with textural and sonic exploration rather than conventional melody. Yet it conveys the theme wonderfully."

In an article for Artforum, David Grundy wrote: "The album forces us to consider what it means to represent the unrepresentable, to render historical trauma in art." Music and Literature's Cam Scott wrote: "this instrumental rendering of place feels conversational as well as narrative, a wistful annotation of so many captured landscapes and their people." He called "The Removal" "one of the key performances in a long history of jazz engagement with freedom movements."

== Track listing ==
Composed by Jacques Coursil.

1. "I – Nunna Daul Sunyi" – 7:08
2. "II – Tagaloo, Georgia" – 4:47
3. "III – Tahlequah, Oklahoma" – 3:10
4. "IV – The Removal (Act I)" – 11:26
5. "V – The Removal (Act II)" – 6:10
6. "VI – Gorée" – 4:35
7. "VII – The Middle Passage" – 2:42
- Tracks 1–3, 6, and 7 recorded in January and February 2009 in Fort de France, Martinique. Track 4 recorded in May 2007 in Belleville, New Jersey, United States, and in January 2008 in Montreuil, France. Track 5 recorded in January 2008 in Montreuil, France, and in January 2009 in Fort de France, Martinique.

== Personnel ==
- Jacques Coursil – trumpet
- Mark Whitecage – alto saxophone (track 4)
- Perry Robinson – clarinet (track 4)
- Jeff Baillard – keyboards (tracks 1–3, 6, 7)
- Bobby Few – piano (tracks 4, 5)
- Alex Bernard – bass (tracks 1–3, 6, 7)
- Alan Silva – bass (track 4)
- José Zebina – drums (tracks 1–3, 6, 7)
- Sunny Murray – drums (track 4)
