= Brother, the Great Spirit Made Us All =

Studio album by Dave Brubeck
- Released: 1974
- Recorded: 1974
- Studio: C.I. Studios, New York City
- Genre: Jazz
- Length: 37:44
- Label: Atlantic - SD 1660
- Producer: Michael Cuscuna

Dave Brubeck chronology
Two Generations of Brubeck (1973)	Brother, the Great Spirit Made Us All (1974)	All the Things We Are (1974)

Brother, the Great Spirit Made Us All is a 1974 studio album by Dave Brubeck accompanied by his sons Darius, Chris and Dan.

== Reception ==
Professional ratings
Review scores
Source	Rating
Allmusic	2.5/5 stars

The album was reviewed by Scott Yanow at Allmusic who wrote that the musicians "...perform colorful treatments of a wide variety of swinging pieces. Highlights include "It's a Raggy Waltz," "Temptation Boogie" and "Christopher Columbus"; Dave Brubeck takes "The Duke" solo. This fine music was last available on LP."

== Track listing ==
1. "Mr. Broadway" - 2:44
2. "Forty Days" - 7:20
3. "The Duke" - 2:48
4. "It's a Raggy Waltz" - 6:00 5
5. "Sky Scape" (Darius Brubeck) - 2:42
6. "Temptation Boogie" (Darius Brubeck) - 8:20
7. "Ragaroni" (Perry Robinson) - 2:50
8. "Christopher Columbus" (Chu Berry, Andy Razaf) - 4:00

All compositions by Dave Brubeck unless otherwise indicated.

== Personnel ==
- Dave Brubeck - piano
- Darius Brubeck - electric piano
- Jerry Bergonzi - soprano saxophone, tenor saxophone
- Chris Brubeck - electric bass, trombone
- Dan Brubeck - drums
- David Powell - double bass
- Perry Robinson - clarinet
- Peter "Madcat" Ruth - harmonica, Jew's harp
- Michael Cuscuna - producer
