= Phoebe Jacobs =

American jazz music promoter

- Born: Phoebe Pincus; June 21, 1919
- Died: April 9, 2012 (aged 92); New York City
- Occupation: Music promoter

Phoebe Jacobs (June 21, 1919 – April 9, 2012) was an American promoter of jazz musicians. She was particularly associated with Louis Armstrong.

== Career ==
She was born Phoebe Pincus to Hyman Pincus, a bootlegger, and the former Beatrice Watkins in The Bronx.

She began her career when she was 17 years old, obtaining a job at Kelly's Stables, a jazz nightclub based in Manhattan run by her mother's relative Ralph Watkins. While at the nightclub she came into contact with Billie Holiday, Nat King Cole and the arranger Sy Oliver. Oliver enabled her to get a job at Decca Records where she was responsible for contacting and hiring musicians for recording sessions. When Ralph Watkins became part owner of the Basin Street East, Jacobs followed him, working as a publicist and general assistant for the nightclub.

For the major part of her career Phoebe Jacobs was an independent publicist for such prominent musicians as Duke Ellington, Ella Fitzgerald, Peggy Lee, Sy Oliver, Della Reese and Sarah Vaughan.

A major part of her career consisted of working for the Rainbow Room, where she functioned as Director of Public Relations and Producer of Special Events. In this position she came into contact with many prominent performers in addition to her own clients including Benny Goodman and Cy Coleman.

She worked very closely with Louis Armstrong during the last decade of his life, initially as a public relations specialist. In 1969, she helped found the Louis Armstrong Educational Foundation and served as that organization's Executive Vice President and Director.

In 1989, she was a co-founder of the Jazz Foundation of America, a nonprofit that provides support to musicians in need.

She was a supporter of Beth Israel Hospital's Louis Armstrong Center for Music and Medicine.

Jacobs died in at Beth Israel Hospital in New York City.

== Personal ==
Phoebe Jacobs was married three times; her third husband Lou Jacobs pre-deceased her. She had two children, a son, Jerry Fella, and a daughter, Susan Devens as well as grandchildren, Chris and Seth Kunin, and great-grandchildren, Jacob Kunin, Kayla Kunin, Phoebe Kunin, and Zachary Kunin.
