= Gerald Achee =

Musical artist (1952–2021)

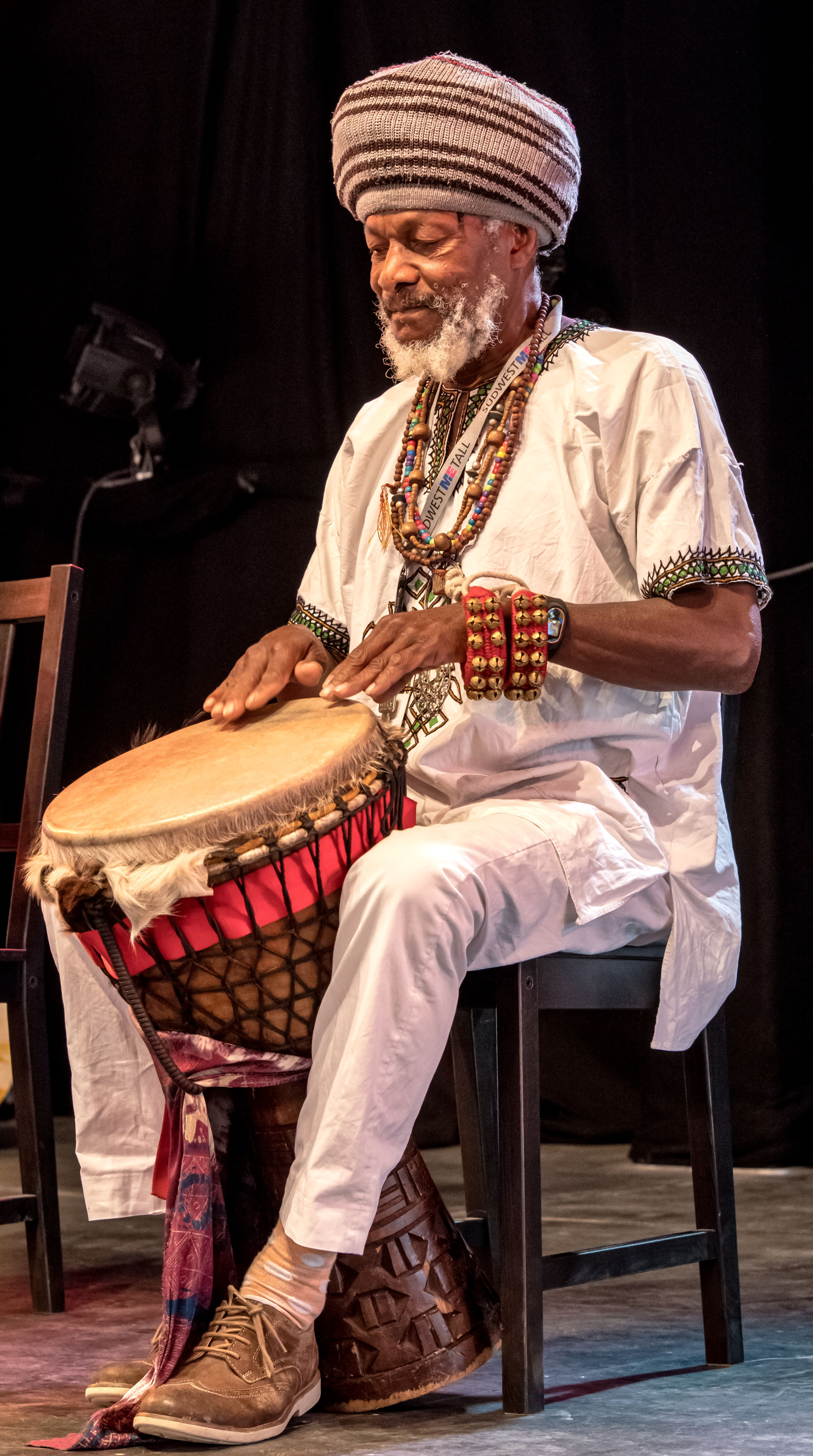
- Achee performing in 2016

Background information
- Born: November 15, 1952; St. James, Port of Spain, Trinidad and Tobago
- Origin: Brooklyn, New York
- Died: January 12, 2021 (aged 68) Jersey City, NJ
- Genres: World music, Calypso, Free jazz
- Occupation: Musician/drummer
- Instrument: Dejembe drums
- Years active: 1969–2021
- Formerly of: Village Drums of Freedom

Gerald Achee (November 15, 1952 - January 12, 2021) known by his stage name Gerry Drums, was a Trinidadian drummer and the leader of the Village Drums of Freedom.

== Biography ==
Gerald Achee was born in St. James, a suburb of Trinidad and Tobago's capital Port of Spain. He was introduced to the traditional Afro-Caribbean music at an early age. Achee started his artistic career as a limbo-dancer. Later he began to play djembe. In 1969 Gerald Achee founded the free improvisation percussion band Village Drums of Freedom. From 1970 until 1980 he travelled with his ensemble and a group of dancers through Europe, South America and US and then finally settled in Brooklyn, NY. His band grew bigger and now consists of more than a hundred drummers all over the world. Every year Village Drums of Freedom plays a leading part in the Trinidad and Tobago Carnival. In 2003 Gerald Achee and VDOF released an album Historic Travel: cultural rhythms. In 2009 he recorded an album Three Neighbours with Perry Robinson and Joel Chassan. And in the same year – Night Train For Lovers And Thieves with the Gypsy Groovz Orchestra, which was nominated to the Best Album of 2009 in World music on BBC. Gerald Achee was a member of the Rastafari movement.

== Style ==
Gerald Achee
Djembe solo improvisation

Gerald Achee (Stage name Gerry Drums) was a Calypso musician and djembe drummer. In his music, Achee develops traditions of Count Ossie, Andre Tanker and Babatunde Olatunji. His works with clarinetist Perry Robinson and other jazz musicians characterised him as a free jazz, avant-garde djembe drummer.

== Discography ==
- 2003: Historic Travel: cultural rhythms (Village Drums of Freedom)
- 2009: Three Neighbours (Gerald Achee, Perry Robinson and Joel Chassan)
- 2009: Night Train For Lovers And Thieves (Gerald Achee and Gypsy Groovz Orchestra)

== See also ==
- Polyrhythm
- Master drummer
