= Scorpio (Arthur Jones album) =

Studio album by Arthur Jones
- Released: 1971
- Recorded: August 1969
- Studios: Studio Saravah, Paris
- Genre: Free jazz
- Length: 38:45
- Labels: BYG; 529.350
- Producers: Jean Georgakarakos, Jean-Luc Young

Arthur Jones chronology
Africanasia (1969)	Scorpio (1971)

Scorpio is an album by saxophonist Arthur Jones. It was recorded at Studio Saravah in Paris during August 1969, and was released in 1971 by BYG Records as part of their Actuel series. On the album, Jones is joined by two French musicians, bassist Beb Guérin and drummer Claude Delcloo.

The track titled "Brother B." was included in the 2001 compilation Jazzactuel. The entire album was reissued by Ezz-Thetics, an imprint of Hat Hut Records, as part of the 2023 compilation Clifford Thornton Ketchaoua Revisited, paired with the 1969 Clifford Thornton album Ketchaoua.

== Reception ==
Professional ratings
Review scores
Source	Rating
AllMusic	4.5/5 stars

In a review for AllMusic, Brandon Burke called the album "a highly enjoyable set" and "a very warm and firmly rooted free jazz record," and wrote: "While the late-'60s avant-garde jazz scene is typically associated with heated and furious solo flights, Jones managed to fuse his love of older bop and blues players with the prevalent tendencies of the day. In this way, Jones was as adept at caressing a ballad as he was at shredding apart a fast one." He concluded by calling it "highly recommended."

Phil Freeman of Burning Ambulance stated: "The rhythm section... interact in a manner reminiscent of Gary Peacock and Sunny Murray on Albert Ayler's Spiritual Unity, from five years earlier. Guerin yanks at the bass strings so hard, they seem at risk of coming unwound, or flying off the neck. Delcloo works mostly with cymbals, hi-hat and bass pedal, rarely touching the snare drum." He stated that "Jones' phrasing and tone recall Ornette Coleman, though he's a little more inclined to go for a deep, bluesy honk at the bottom of the alto's range than Coleman is, and at the height of his solos he lets his lines run longer, and get more repetitive and shrieky, than the Texan would do in a similar situation."

Point of Departure's Chris Robinson commented: "Scorpio gets a ten out of ten for the Jones Trio's... execution of its vision and aesthetic... Scorpio might not be as canonical, radical, or revelatory as its close cousin Spiritual Unity, but the record hits every mark it sets for itself. It's close to perfection."

== Track listing ==
Composed by Arthur Jones.

Side A

1. "C.R.M." – 10:15
2. "B.T." – 8:00

Side B

1. "Sad Eyes" – 13:10
2. "Brother B." – 7:20

== Personnel ==
- Arthur Jones – alto saxophone
- Beb Guérin – bass
- Claude Delcloo – drums
