= Sanga of The Valley =

- Birth name: Anthony Francis
- Also known as: Sanga of The Valley
- Born: April 22, 1957 (age 68); Trinidad and Tobago
- Origin: New York, US
- Genres: World music, Calypso
- Occupation: Musician
- Instrument: Drums
- Years active: 1978–present

Anthony Francis (born April 22, 1957), known by his stage name Sanga of The Valley, is a Trinidadian drummer, Babatunde Olatunji' s student, member of the Village Drums of Freedom.

== Biography ==
Anthony Francis was born in Trinidad. He started playing African drums at an early age. In the beginning of 1970s Francis moved to New York City, where he met Babatunde Olatunji and became Baba's student and one of his lead djembe players. Anthony Francis spent 25 years with Olatunji and his band Drums of Passion. He worked with artists such as Carlos Santana, Nina Simone, The Grateful Dead, the Neville Brothers and Stanley Jordan. Since 1989, he started working with Raven Recording and Gabrielle Roth. In 1993, Francis together with Babatunde Olatunji took part in the first in the history djembe educational video called African Drumming. In 2003, Anthony Francis and Village Drums of Freedom released an album Historic travel: cultural rhythms. In 2004 after Olatunji’s death, Francis led the tribute performance in A Great Night in Harlem Benefit Concert in Apollo Theatre. He is a member of the Rastafari Movement.

== Awards ==
As a member of Olatunji's Drums of Passion and a part of Mickey Hart's Planet Drum projects (album Planet Drum) Sanga of The Valley won the Grammy Award for Best World Music Album of 1991, the first year for which the award was given.

== See also ==
- Polyrhythm
- Djembe
- Improvisation

== Discography ==
- Dance to the Beat of My Drum (1986, Bellaphon)
- Drums of Passion: The Invocation (1988, Rykodisc)
- Drums of Passion: The Beat (1989, Rykodisc)
- Drums of Passion: Celebrate Freedom, Justice & Peace (1993, Olatunji Music)
- Drums of Passion and More (1994, Bear Family) Box Set
- Babatunde Olatunji, Healing Rhythms, Songs and Chants (1995, Olatunji Music)
- Love Drum Talk (1997, Chesky)
- Drums of Passion [Expanded] (2002)
- Olatunji Live at Starwood (2003) Recorded Live at the Starwood Festival 1997
- Healing Session (2003, Narada)
- Circle of Drums (2005, Chesky)
- Historic Travel: cultural rhythms (2003, Village Drums of Freedom)
