= FreeJazzArt =

FreeJazzArt (Sessions for Bill Dixon)
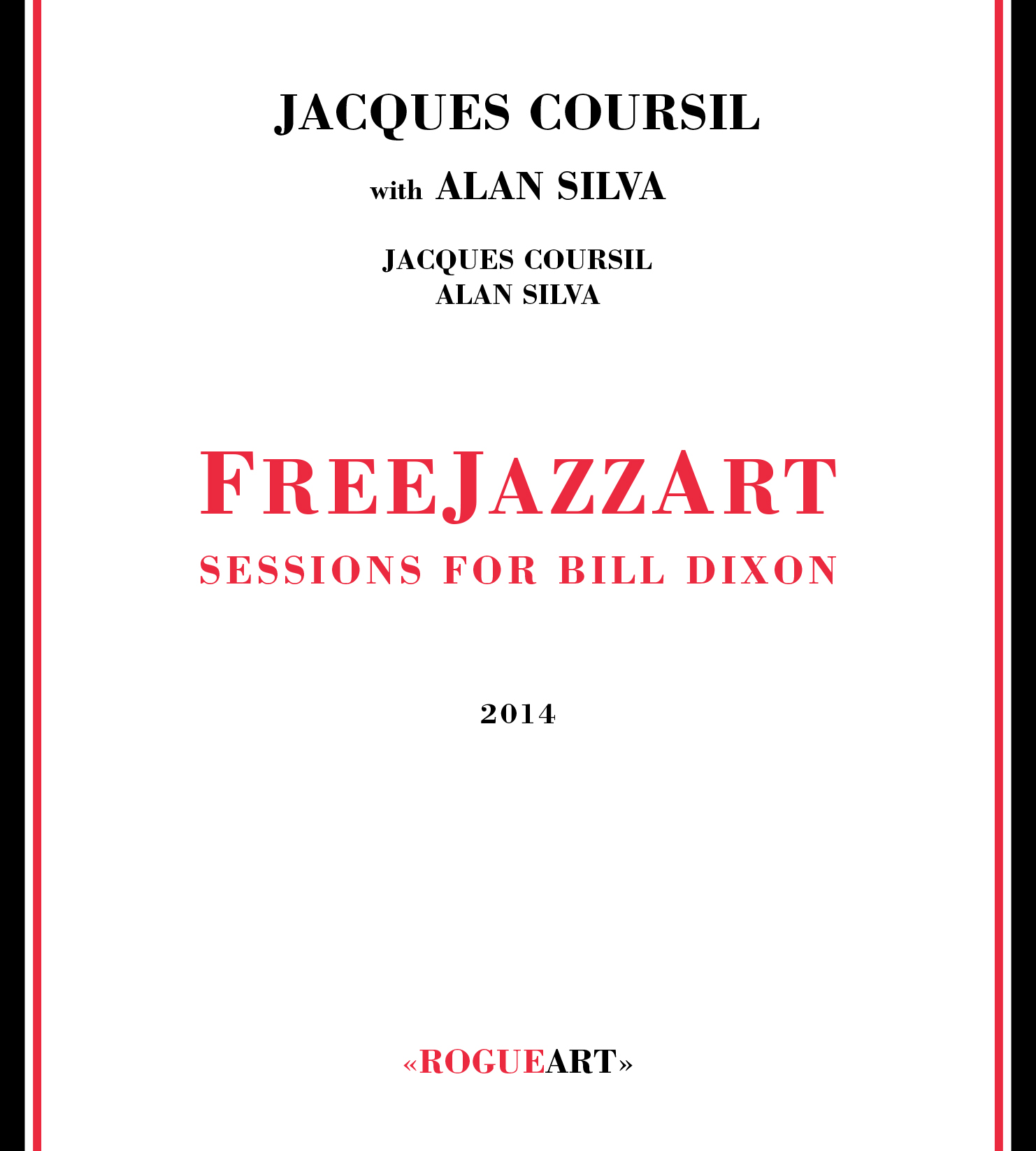

Live album by Jacques Coursil and Alan Silva
- Released: 2014
- Recorded: November 22 and 23, 2014
- Venue: La Muse en Circuit, Alfortville, France
- Genre: Free jazz
- Label: RogueArt; ROG-0052
- Producer: Michel Dorbon

Jacques Coursil chronology
Trails of Tears (2010)	FreeJazzArt (Sessions for Bill Dixon) (2014)	Hostipitality Suite (2020)

Alan Silva chronology
Stinging Nettles (2014)	FreeJazzArt (Sessions for Bill Dixon) (2014)	Free Electric Band (2016)

FreeJazzArt (Sessions for Bill Dixon) is a live album by trumpeter and composer Jacques Coursil and bassist Alan Silva. It was recorded in November 2014 at La Muse en Circuit in Alfortville, France, and was released later that year by RogueArt. The album is dedicated to composer and trumpeter Bill Dixon, with whom both musicians worked.

== Reception ==
In a review for Point of Departure, Clifford Allen wrote: "FreeJazzArt is an appropriate homage, though as one would hope the music diverges from anything possible in the preceding decades. In terms of tone, Coursil does have a fair amount of Dixon in him... The way in which a limited range of colors can be used to create something with this vastness and magnificence is a teaching not frequently adhered to, and the world created here is both pared-down and microcosmic... this music is a distinctly powerful piece of art for which the concept of a 'tribute' is inexact. In creating something highly individual, a tough legacy is receiving proper due."

Ken Waxman, writing for Jazz Word, stated: "each of Coursil's three compositions is a medley of low-key vibrations and tremolo repetitions... Silva's spiky staccato lines, which similarly retain mainstream balance, not only add a needed toughness to the interface, but also prompt the trumpeter to further ethereal melodiousness."

In an article for Music and Literature, Cam Scott commented: "FreeJazzArt is not only a collaboration between Silva and Coursil, but a collaboration of their pairing with Dixon’s posterity... If Dixon's absent voice is nonetheless a tonal interlocutor, then Coursil's spacious phrasing places him within the music, as a principle of relation, while Silva's ghostly harmonics score the air between participants. It is a beautiful recording, and a return of sorts for those involved to the New York of their mutual formation."

== Track listing ==
Composed by Jacques Coursil.

An Evening and a Night at the Annex Bar

1. "Part 1" – 3:14
2. "Part 2" – 3:51
3. "Part 3" – 2:25
4. "Part 4" – 4:01
5. "Part 5" – 2:41

Brooklyn Bridge, the Metal and the Wind

6. "Part 1" – 3:05
7. "Part 2" – 3:08
8. "Part 3" – 2:51
9. "Part 4" – 2:21
10. "Part 5" – 2:41

Bennington-New York, Round Trip

11. "Part 1" – 2:04
12. "Part 2" – 2:26
13. "Part 3" – 1:30
14. "Part 4" – 2:47
15. "Part 5" – 3:57

== Personnel ==
- Jacques Coursil – trumpet
- Alan Silva – bass
