= Jazz Foundation of America =

Non-profit organization

The Jazz Foundation of America (JFA) is a non-profit organization based in Manhattan, New York that was founded in 1989. Its programs seek to help jazz and blues musicians in need of emergency funds and connect them with performance opportunities in schools and the community.

The Jazz Musicians' Emergency Fund and Housing Fund, established with corporate help, assists freelance musicians who lack benefits, pensions, or health insurance to cover one-time expenses. Musicians can apply to the foundation's social workers for help with rent, housing, mortgage payments, and health care. The foundation created a volunteer network of professionals throughout the United States to provide free legal, dental, and other health services when needed.

The foundation's Jazz in the Schools program occurs in eight states as educational outreach and an employment service. The program offers free performances by musicians which include information about instruments and the history of jazz. Musicians are paid by the foundation. The Varis/Jazz in Schools program employs over 120 musicians in New York City and hundreds throughout the south, reaching public schools and hospital schools. The current artistic directors are Steve Jordan and Meegan Voss.

== History ==
The organization began with founder Herb Storfer and friends Ann Ruckert, Stella Marrs, Jimmy Owens, Vishnu Wood, Jamil Nassar, Phoebe Jacobs, and Billy Taylor in 1989. Storfer housed the foundation in his Manhattan loft. Funds were raised by selling tickets to jam sessions in the loft. The Jazz Foundation of America was incorporated in 1990. This was followed by an event at Town Hall which raised over sixty thousand dollars to establish the Jazz Emergency Fund. Jazz musicians Jamil Nassar and Jimmy Owens became the organization's outreach network, connecting musicians in need of rent money or medical payments to the organization's founder. The committee of founders began to network with other service organizations who shared similar objectives. The Actor's Fund and MusiCares provided part-time social workers for the foundation's substance abuse programs.

From 1997 to 2000, executive director Susan Cipollone made one or two assessments per day and helped about 35 musicians in a year. The foundation offered substance abuse programs and began their Monday night jam sessions as a way of hiring musicians in need.

The board of directors consists of friends and acquaintances who offered service. When jazz trumpeter Dizzy Gillespie died in 1993, one of his last requests was that any jazz musician in need of medical care be treated free of charge at Englewood Hospital and Medical Center. His request was that doctors provide free treatment to one musician per year. This was changed to a pro bono network of physicians at Englewood Hospital & Health Center to treat musicians. Physician Francis "Frank" Forte led the Dizzy Gillespie Memorial Fund while the foundation referred clients to the hospital for treatment. The organization provided uninsured jazz musicians with $300,000 a year in pro bono medical care and operations.

The organization moved into an office in the Local 802 branch of the American Federation of Musicians. In 2000, Wendy Oxenhorn became executive director and increased the number of musicians assisted from 35 per year to over 150. Oxenhorn organized "A Great Night in Harlem" in 2001 at the Apollo Theater in Harlem. She had financial support from Jarrett Lilien, the COO of a financial company who became the board's president. Lilien started a support network to try to prevent musicians from becoming destitute.

The foundation helped musicians in New York City after the terrorist attacks of September 11, 2001, by paying their bills and trying to find other venues at which they could perform. With $100,000 from the Music Performance Trust Fund and help from Local 802 Union., the foundation created school performances for over 400 musicians. The foundation's cases increased from 35 to 500 cases per year.

After Hurricane Katrina, Oxenhorn met Agnes Varis at an event hosted by Dick Parsons, telling her about the need to help musicians in New Orleans. Varis agreed to give $250,000 to create a Jazz in the Schools program in which musicians were paid for one-hour educational performances in local schools. Over 20 million dollars were raised since the first concert and over 6,000 emergency assists were possible each year.

== A Great Night in Harlem ==
The foundation derives much of its funding from its annual fundraiser, "A Great Night in Harlem," held every May. This event includes a concert at the Apollo Theater which has been hosted by Danny Glover, Bill Cosby, Gil Noble, and Danny Aiello. Past performers include Odetta, Dr. John, Little Jimmy Scott, Henry Butler, Dr. Michael White, Quincy Jones, Regina Carter, Elvis Costello, Arturo O'Farrill, Candido Camero, Sweet Georgia Brown, Whoopi Goldberg, Chevy Chase, Joe Piscopo, Norah Jones, Hank Jones, Dave Brubeck, Jimmy Heath, Paul Shaffer, and Jimmy Norman.
