= Minimal Brass =

Studio album by Jacques Coursil
- Released: 2005
- Recorded: November 2004
- Studio: Fingerlakes Recording, Ithaca, New York
- Genre: Jazz
- Label: Tzadik Records; TZ 8016
- Producer: Jacques Coursil

Jacques Coursil chronology
Black Suite (1971)	Minimal Brass (2005)	Clameurs (2007)

Minimal Brass is an album by trumpeter and composer Jacques Coursil. It was recorded at Fingerlakes Recording in Ithaca, New York in November 2004, and was released in 2005 by Tzadik Records. On the album, Coursil performs fanfares composed of multiple overdubbed parts that employ circular breathing.

Minimal Brass was recorded with the encouragement of John Zorn, who had studied with Coursil while the latter was teaching at the United Nations International School in the early 1970s, and was released after a hiatus of over thirty years. (Coursil's previous album as a leader was Black Suite (1971).) In an interview, Coursil recalled: "Minimal Brass was kind of a statement where the music goes into circles, in some way. I wanted to find some point where my hearing finally ended, and it came out like that. John Zorn was really surprised."

Regarding his time away from recording and performing in public, Coursil stated that he "practiced trumpet like a painter trying to find his colors." He remarked: "The music was still there... I never left the instrument. It was part of my well-being, my breathing. If I don't have a trumpet I might just have a stroke. So I kept on playing. It's like a subterranean river that suddenly reaches the surface."

According to Coursil, he learned circular breathing from trumpeter Jimmy Owens during the mid-1970s. He stated that, from that point on, he "started stopping all the clichés that I heard and learned, dropping them off, and in jazz, rhythm and blues, free jazz, there's a lot of that. Then dropping all the clichés I have invented myself, as far I could know. And keep on circular breathing, just one note. And from then until now, it's just been one note." As to why he chose to overdub multiple trumpet parts rather than hire musicians, he reflected: "It would have been too long to explain and I don't know many people who circular breathe and who know how to double tongue, triple tongue and certainly not 8 or 10 or 12 of them."

== Reception ==
Professional ratings
Review scores
Source	Rating
The Penguin Guide to Jazz	3/4 stars

The authors of the Penguin Guide to Jazz Recordings wrote: "these improvisations have a wonderful, ringing authority, a sense of some long-buried sense of mission coming overground again. It's always easy to over-dramatize the creative return... of a once-important figure. Coursil comes back a new man, declamatory, lyrical, fresh-toned and in every way marvelous."

Cam Scott, writing for Music & Literature, stated: "Minimal Brass is a practiced and contemplative solo recording, a program of both auto-accompaniment and self-differentiation. The three twelve-part fanfares comprising the album are highly composed, yet evoke the interrelation of layers that made Black Suite a model for free chamber jazz thirty-five years earlier. And whatever it might have weathered in the interim, Coursil's sound is hugely improved by this passage of time. His flutter-tongued articulation contrasts an ambient duration of breath, unto an oceanic unity of speed and stasis. This is one technical manifestation of the duality of Coursil’s tone, which otherwise moves from heraldic brightness to a woody, flute-like sound, preserving a supportive breath within each note."

== Track listing ==
Composed by Jacques Coursil.

1. "First Fanfare" – 17:08
2. "Second Fanfare" – 7:44
3. "Last Fanfare" – 7:43

== Personnel ==
- Jacques Coursil – trumpet
