= Village Drums of Freedom =

Percussion ensemble

- Origin: Brooklyn, NY, United States
- Genres: World music, Calypso
- Members: Gerald Achee, Sanga of The Valley and others

Village Drums of Freedom are free improvisation percussion band founded in 1969 by Trinidadian drummer Gerald Achee. As of 2012 VDOF consists of more than a hundred jembe players all over the world. Most of them are members of Rastafari Movement. Village Drums of Freedom are Calypso band. Every year they play a leading part in the Trinidad and Tobago Carnival. In 2003 VDOF released an album Historic travel: cultural rhythms.

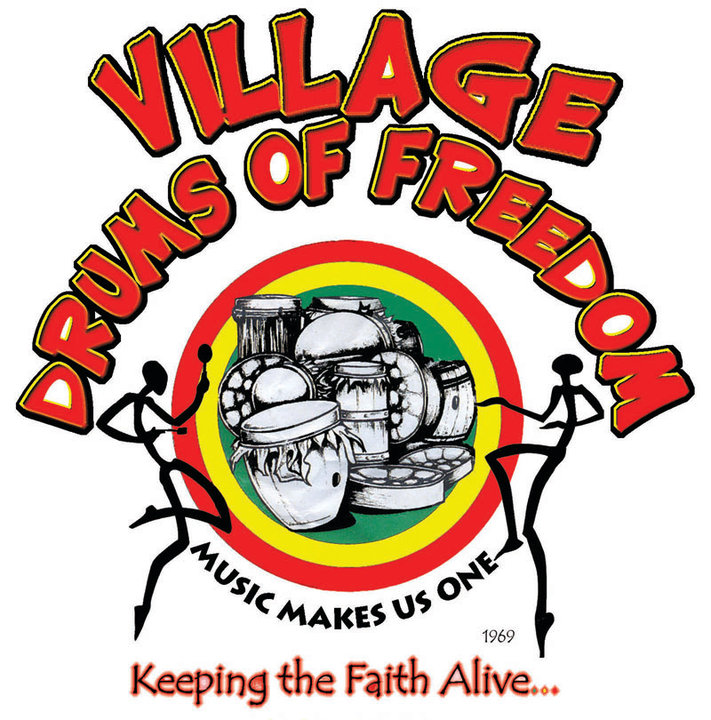
Logo

== See also ==
- Polyrhythm
- Djembe
- Improvisation
