= The Tallest Tree in Our Forest =

- Directed by: Gil Noble
- Written by: Gil Noble
- Produced by: Gil Noble
- Starring: Paul Robeson
- Edited by: Antonio Andresekais
- Distributed by: Phoenix Learning Group, Inc.
- Release date: 1977
- Running time: 90 minutes
- Country: United States
- Language: English

The Tallest Tree in our Forest is a 1977 documentary film directed and written by Gil Noble, about singer, actor and activist, Paul Robeson. It was shot on 16mm film and was started shortly before Robeson's death at age 77 in 1976. The film features rare archival footage, interviews, and still photography from the twentieth century. The title is taken from a 1940s statement made by Mary McLeod Bethune describing Paul Robeson. The film was originally available in a three-part format for use on public-access television channels and in classrooms for ages fourteen and above.

== Interviewers ==
- Paul Robeson
- Harry Belafonte
- Lloyd Brown
- Dizzy Gillespie
- Paul Robeson, Jr.
- John Henrik Clarke
