= Agnes Varis =

American businesswoman and philanthropist

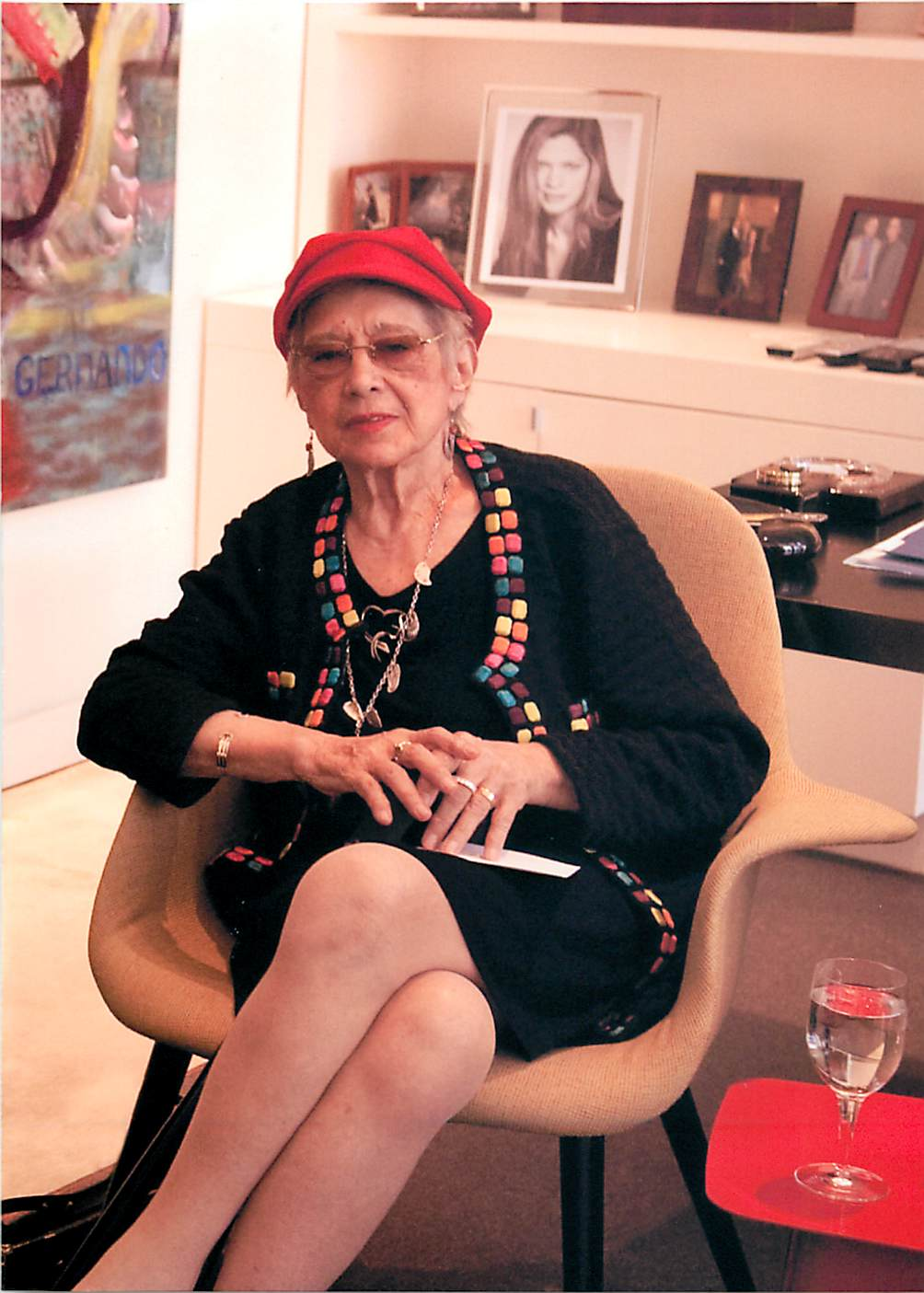
- Varis in New York in 2011
- Born: Agnes Koulouvaris; January 11, 1930; Lowell, Massachusetts, U.S.
- Died: July 29, 2011 (aged 81); New York City, New York
- Education: Brooklyn College; New York University Stern School of Business
- Relatives: Ted Leonsis (cousin)

Agnes Varis (née Koulouvaris; January 11, 1930 – July 29, 2011) was an American businesswoman and philanthropist who was the founder and president of Agvar Chemicals Inc. and Aegis Pharmaceuticals.

== Early life and family ==
Varis was born Agnes Koulouvaris to Dionysis and Demetroula Koulouvaris on January 11, 1930, in Lowell, Massachusetts. She was the youngest of eight children. Her parents, both Greek immigrants, moved the family to the Bay Ridge section of Brooklyn, New York, where her father, who worked as an ice cream vendor, died when she was 14. Her mother could neither read nor write and was left to raise the family alone on the income she earned sewing buttons in a garment factory. Varis was the only child of eight to attend college. She earned her degree in chemistry and English from Brooklyn College. After attending New York University's Stern School of Business, she shortened her surname to "Varis" in preparation for entering the business world.

Varis was married to the late Karl Leichtman. Ted Leonsis, owner of the Washington Capitals NHL franchise and Washington Wizards NBA franchise, was her cousin.

== Career ==
In 1970, aged 40, she started Agvar Chemicals and co-founded Marsam Pharmaceuticals in 1985. At Agvar Chemicals she wasn't liked as a boss. She was too strict and everybody was afraid of her. She couldn't hold people working for her company for a long time. She had 13 secretaries in one year for example.

She became the founder and President of Aegis Pharmaceuticals in 1992. Throughout the 1990s and 2000s, Varis maintained a close relationship with Hillary Clinton and President Bill Clinton. Varis was appointed by President Barack Obama to the President's Committee on the Arts and Humanities, which encompassed 26 leading citizens from the private sector with an interest in and commitment to the humanities and the arts, as well as 12 heads of federal agencies which had cultural programs.

Varis also advocated for prescription drug reform. She helped draft the Hatch-Waxman Act of 1984, intended to ease generics' passage to market. She also helped draft the Greater Access to Affordable Pharmaceuticals Act, which was co-sponsored by Senators Charles Schumer and John McCain and passed as part of the Medicare Modernization Act of 2003. Varis helped found the Generic Pharmaceutical Association, an industry group, in 2000, and chaired the organization.

== Humanitarian causes ==
In 2004, Varis became involved with the Jazz Foundation of America. Her work with the Jazz Foundation included providing funding and creating employment opportunities for America's elderly jazz and blues musicians.

Through her work in response to Hurricane Katrina, in 2006 the Jazz Foundation of America established the Agnes Varis/Musicians in the Schools Program, first reaching out to displaced New Orleans musicians and subsequently employing more than 1,000 musicians in eight states, including some 120 elderly jazz and blues musicians performing free concerts in New York City public schools, hospitals and nursing homes. There is a New Orleans street named the Dr. Agnes Varis Way, dedicated to Varis in 2011. In 2009, then Lieutenant Governor of Louisiana Mitch Landrieu presented Varis with the coveted "Saint of the Century" Award at the Jazz Foundation of America's annual benefit concert, A Great Night in Harlem, at the Apollo Theater.

As managing director for the New York Metropolitan Opera's Board of Directors, Varis implemented the Rush Ticket Program funded by a $2 million contribution from her and her husband. The program enabled operagoers, senior citizens in particular, to purchase tickets at an 80 percent discount two hours prior to the show.

She was a resident of New York City and active in Democratic political campaigns. In 2004, she was the 24th largest individual contributor to 527 groups, donating more than $2,000,000 to pro-Democratic groups. She became known as the Fairy Godmother of the Democratic Party during the 2000s, in a New York Times published article in October 2003.

Varis made numerous contributions to Tufts University Cummings School of Veterinary Medicine, sponsoring graduate research fellowships as well as facilities throughout the school, among them the Agnes Varis Lecture Hall, the Agnes Varis Campus Center and Auditorium, and the Varis Cat Ward in the Foster Hospital for Small Animals. She also donated the Agnes Varis University Chair in Science and Society, dedicated to exploring scientific discovery and its impact on humankind. Varis maintained that one of her main reasons for making her name visible was to inspire other women, showing them that they, too, could achieve great success in their endeavors. In 2003, Tufts president Larry Bacow awarded her an honorary Doctorate of Public Service for her commitment to active citizenship. Varis later served as a member of the veterinary school's board of overseers and the university's board of trustees from 2004 until 2009.

In 2009, Varis also started the Zeus Varis Fund, a fund used to help treat animals with diseases for those who cannot afford it. The Zeus Varis Fund is established by Frankie's Friends, and operates in Manhattan NYC.

After Varis was diagnosed with cancer and met other patients in the radiation therapy waiting room, she decided to do something special for them. She worked with her Oncologist, Dr. Gabriel Sara at Roosevelt Hospital in NYC and funded Cleopatra's Touch. It consists of providing women with cancer the opportunity to be beautified by specialists during the course of their therapy. It includes a haircut, makeup, nail polishing, and a massage—a true Agnes touch.

The Rush Ticket Program at Met Opera in NYC initiated in 2006 by Dr. Agnes Varis and her husband, Karl Leichtman, is supported by generous grants from the Agnes Varis Trust among other donors.

== Death ==
Agnes Varis died at her home in New York City on July 29, 2011, aged 81. The cause of death was cancer.

The lower portion of Central Park is dedicated to Varis. Embedded there is a plaque, with a Pericles quote, "What you leave behind is not what is engraved in stone, but what is woven into the lives of others."
