= All the Things We Are =

Studio album by Dave Brubeck
- Released: May 25, 1976
- Recorded: July 17, 1973 & October 3, 1974
- Studio: CI Recording Studios, NYC
- Genre: Mainstream jazz Post-bop; Piano jazz
- Length: 45:06
- Label: Atlantic Records
- Producer: Michael Cuscuna

Dave Brubeck chronology
We're All Together Again For The First Time (1972)	All the Things We Are (1976)	Two Generations of Brubeck (1973)

Professional ratings
Review scores
Source	Rating
AllMusic	4/5 stars

All the Things We Are is a jazz album by Dave Brubeck released by Atlantic Records on May 25, 1976, featuring two alto saxophonists, Lee Konitz and Anthony Braxton, and two drummers, Alan Dawson and Roy Haynes. This album was completed through two recording sessions at the CI Recording Studios in New York City on different dates.

On July 17, 1973, the Dave Brubeck Trio (Brubeck playing the piano, Jack Six playing the bass, and Alan Dawson playing the drums) recorded the "Jimmy Van Heusen Medley".

On October 3, 1974, the recording occurred with the group as a quintet (with the addition of alto saxophonists Lee Konitz and Anthony Braxton while Roy Haynes took the spot as drummer. The rest of the songs were recorded that day. Konitz played the alto saxophone in "Like Someone in Love" and "Don't Get Around Much Anymore" while Braxton played it in "In Your Own Sweet Way". Both Konitz and Braxton are featured in "All the Things You Are".

The New Yorker claimed that this album was/is underrated in an article in 2012, following Brubeck's death.

== Track listing ==
1. "Like Someone in Love" 6:20 (Jimmy Van Heusen, Johnny Burke)
2. "In Your Own Sweet Way" 7:38 (Dave Brubeck)
3. "All the Things You Are" 7:28 (Jerome Kern, Oscar Hammerstein II)
4. Jimmy Van Heusen Medley 20:48 (Jimmy Van Heusen, Johnny Burke, Eddie DeLange)
  - "Deep in a Dream"
  - "Like Someone in Love"
  - "Here's That Rainy Day"
  - "Polka Dots and Moonbeams"
  - "It Could Happen to You"
5. "Don't Get Around Much Anymore" 2:47 (Duke Ellington, Bob Russell)

== Personnel ==
- Dave Brubeck - piano
- Lee Konitz - alto saxophone (1,3,5)
- Anthony Braxton - alto saxophone (2,3)
- Jack Six - bass
- Roy Haynes - drums (1–3)
- Alan Dawson - drums (4)

=== Technical personnel ===
- Michael Cuscuna - producer
- Elvin Campbell - engineer
- Stephen Innocenzi - mastering
