= Way Ahead =

Studio album by Jacques Coursil
- Released: 1969
- Recorded: July 7 and 8, 1969
- Studio: Studio Saravah, Paris
- Genre: Jazz
- Length: 36:06
- Label: BYG Records; 529.319
- Producer: Jean Georgakarakos, Jean Luc Young

Jacques Coursil chronology
Way Ahead (1969)	Black Suite (1971)

Way Ahead (originally released as Way Head) is an album by trumpeter and composer Jacques Coursil. It was recorded at Studio Saravah in Paris in July 1969, and was released later that year by BYG Records as part of their Actuel series. On the album, Coursil is joined by saxophonist Arthur Jones, bassist Beb Guérin, and drummer Claude Delcloo.

== Reception ==
Professional ratings
Review scores
Source	Rating
AllMusic	4.5/5 stars
The Penguin Guide to Jazz	3/4 stars

In a review for AllMusic, Brandon Burke wrote: "Way Ahead is a highly overlooked and absolutely stunning free jazz session. The cacophonous spazzery that marks much of the BYG/Actuel series... is almost nonexistent on Way Ahead. Whereas many of the others in this series... tend to be star-studded anything-goes blowing sessions, Way Ahead is a quartet date and thus, even at its most fevered moments, only sounds like four musicians letting loose as opposed to, say, twelve."

The authors of the Penguin Guide to Jazz Recordings called the album "a worthwhile historical item," and commented: "Somewhat different in cast to the majority of free-jazz free-for-alls of the time, Coursil's small group takes an almost deliberate line on some of the material, and provides a stunning reading of Bill Dixon's 'Paper'. Jones... provides an ideal foil."

Carman Moore, writing for The New York Times, stated: "some of the cuts are primitive in terms of New Thing 1970, although... 'Fidel' is moving and features a lovely passage of catch-and-hide imitations between Coursil and tenor saxophonist Arthur Jones, soaring and gathering light. The feature of the record, however, is Coursil himself, a brilliant improviser possessing speed and coloristic imagination and the ability to play high notes up to a whistle."

== Track listing ==
1. "Duke" (Coursil) – 7:35
2. "Fidel" (Coursil) – 10:03
3. "Paper" (Bill Dixon) – 18:45

== Personnel ==
- Jacques Coursil – trumpet
- Arthur Jones – alto saxophone
- Beb Guérin – bass
- Claude Delcloo – drums
