= Ave B Free Jam =

2021 jazz album recorded live in 1967

Live album by Laurence Cook, Jacques Coursil, Warren Gale, Perry Robinson, and Steve Tintweiss
- Released: 2021
- Recorded: May 12, 1967
- Venue: New York City
- Genre: Free jazz
- Length: 1:18:42
- Label: Inky Dot Media; CD 005

Ave B Free Jam is a live album by drummer Laurence Cook, trumpeters Jacques Coursil and Warren Gale, clarinetist Perry Robinson, and bassist Steve Tintweiss. Consisting of a continuous, extended free improvisation, it was recorded on May 12, 1967, in New York City, and was issued on CD in 2021 by Inky Dot Media.

== Reception ==
Professional ratings
Review scores
Source	Rating
All About Jazz	3/5 stars
Tom Hull – on the Web	B

In a review for The New York City Jazz Record, Pierre Crépon described the album as "a leaderless collective free improvisation devoid of themes or structure, elements that long remained staples of the avant garde when presented publicly," and wrote: "This is free playing of the busy kind, with nearly continuous contributions from all participants... The extended length gives the impression that what is being heard is an unedited version of what would have been trimmed down live... but when the musicians hit, they hit."

George W. Harris of Jazz Weekly noted that the album "gives an aural history of what the free jazz movement of the time was all about," and commented: "The sound is pretty clear, and the music pretty wild... It's like listening to 3 Wagner operas simultaneously, without the overtures."

The Big Takeover's Michael Toland remarked: "The group keeps the pedal to the metal for most of the album... giving it all they've got in a nearly unbroken string of freeform self-expression. That can be a lot to take in for one sitting... But it's difficult to imagine jumping on this ride only to get off a few minutes later, no matter how exhausted, before Ave B Free Jam reaches its destination."

Writing for All About Jazz, Richard J Salvucci called the album "a historical artifact of the avant-garde... Strictly for aficionados of the genre. Others will likely be mystified."

In an article for Contemporary Fusion Reviews, Dick Metcalf wrote: "if you're an improvised music aficionado, this is one of the most important albums you will ever have... over an hour... of freestyle madness that will make your head spin lol... the recording is an improvisor's treasure and gets a MOST HIGHLY RECOMMENDED rating."

A reviewer for Take Effect called the album "an avant-garde experience you’re not going to hear anywhere else," and remarked: "it's amazing that this was recorded way back in 1967... and it clearly illustrates just how ahead of their time these musicians were."

== Track listing ==
The music is continuous. Track marks were embedded to enable segment identification.

1. "Track 01" – 3:14
2. "Track 02" – 2:26
3. "Track 03" – 2:03
4. "Track 04" – 4:24
5. "Track 05" – 3:54
6. "Track 06" – 7:34
7. "Track 07" – 1:53
8. "Track 08" – 5:11
9. "Track 09" – 3:18
10. "Track 10" – 2:16
11. "Track 11" – 3:02
12. "Track 12" – 2:59
13. "Track 13" – 4:33
14. "Track 14" – 4:54
15. "Track 15" – 3:19
16. "Track 16" – 5:27
17. "Track 17" – 3:58
18. "Track 18" – 2:11
19. "Track 19" – 3:20
20. "Track 20" – 4:25
21. "Track 21" – 4:09

== Personnel ==
- Perry Robinson – bass clarinet
- Jacques Coursil – trumpet
- Warren Gale – trumpet
- Steve Tintweiss – bass
- Laurence Cook – drums
