= Darius Brubeck =

American jazz keyboardist and educator (born 1947)

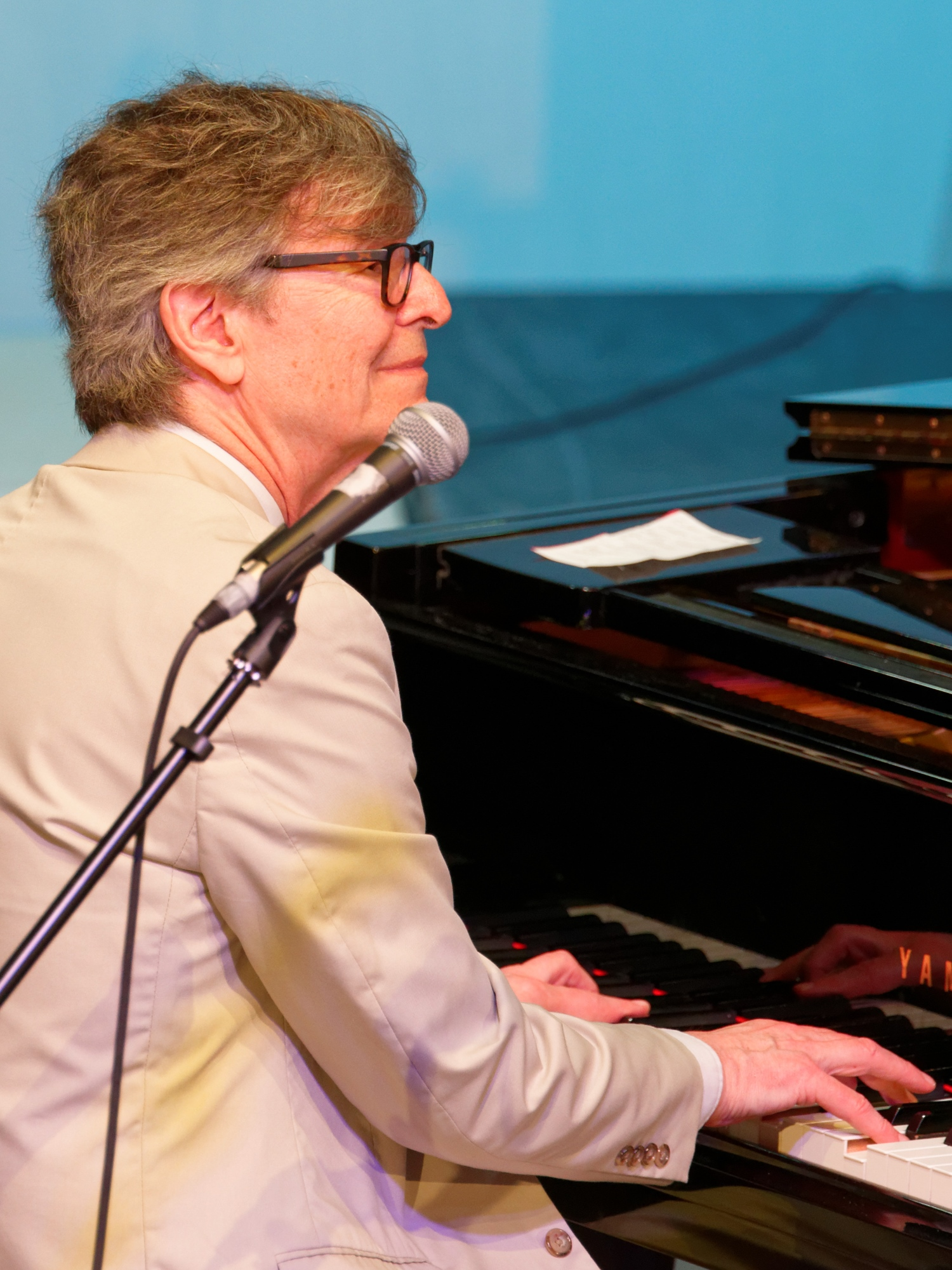
- Darius Brubeck (photo by Rob Blackham)

Background information
- Born: June 14, 1947 (age 79); San Francisco, California, U.S.
- Genre: Jazz
- Occupations: Musician, composer, bandleader
- Instrument: Piano
- Years active: 1960s–present
- Labels: Ubuntu Music, Sheer Sound, B&W Music, Roots Records, Umkhonto Records, Direct to Disc, Paramount Records, Atlantic Records, Vanguard Records, Columbia Records, Tomato Records, Gathering Forces
- Member of: The Darius Brubeck Quartet, Brubecks Play Brubeck
- Formerly of: Darius Brubeck and Afro-Cool Concept, Brubeck/Ntoni Afro-Cool Concept, The New Brubeck Quartet, Two Generations of Brubeck, The Darius Brubeck Ensemble, Gathering Forces, MBR (Muruga Brubeck Robinson)
- Spouse: Catherine Brubeck
- Website: dariusbrubeck.com

David Darius Brubeck (born June 14, 1947) is an American jazz pianist, author, and educator. He is the son of jazz pianist Dave Brubeck with whom he worked professionally in the 1970s, while also performing in his own bands, the Darius Brubeck Ensemble and Gathering Forces.

In 1983, Brubeck joined the staff of the University of Natal (now University of KwaZulu-Natal) in Durban, South Africa, as a lecturer in music with a mission to introduce jazz studies. Brubeck and his wife, Catherine, co-authored a memoir of their time in South Africa between 1983 and 2006 titled Playing the Changes: Jazz at an African University and on the Road, published by University of KwaZulu-Natal Press (2023). The international edition was published by the University of Illinois Press (2024). The couple resides in Rye, East Sussex, in the south of England.

Currently, Darius leads the Darius Brubeck Quartet—Dave O'Higgins, sax; Matt Ridley, bass; Wesley Gibbens, drums—based in London and Brubecks Play Brubeck, featuring his brothers Chris (bass and trombone) and Dan (drums).

A documentary film by Michiel ten Kleij (Red Cloak Films) titled Playing the Changes: Tracking Darius Brubeck was completed in 2023.

== Early life and education ==
Brubeck was born on June 14, 1947, in San Francisco, California. to father Dave and mother Iola (née Whitlock) Brubeck. Darius was named after his father's teacher and mentor, French composer Darius Milhaud.

The family moved from Oakland to Wilton, Connecticut, in 1960, and Darius graduated from Wilton High School in 1965. Darius had five siblings—Michael (d. 2009), Christopher, Catherine, Daniel, and Matthew—three of whom grew up to be professional musicians.

Darius majored in ethnomusicology and the history of religion at Wesleyan University, graduating cum laude in 1969. Brubeck was awarded an MPhil from the University of Nottingham in 2003.

== Career ==
=== Early music career (1970s – early 1980s) ===
While an undergraduate at Wesleyan, Brubeck worked on Christopher's Movie Matinee for the National Film Board of Canada; he is credited for composing music and performing on the screen. As a keyboardist and pianist in the 1970s and early 1980s, Brubeck led the Darius Brubeck Ensemble and Gathering Forces and performed his original music. During that time, he also crossed America as a sideman with Don McLean and recorded two albums with guitarist Larry Coryell. He toured the world and recorded as a member of Two Generations of Brubeck and the New Brubeck Quartet, both led by his father.

=== Academic career (1983 – present) ===
In 1983, Brubeck and his South African wife, Catherine, moved to Durban to join the music department at the University of Natal (renamed University of KwaZulu-Natal in 2004). There, he initiated the first degree course in Jazz Studies offered by an African university. In 1989, he was appointed as professor of Jazz Studies and director of the Centre for Jazz and Popular Music, where he taught until 2005. From 1999 to 2000, Brubeck was a Visiting Fellow at the University of Nottingham, where he earned an MPhil degree and wrote a chapter ("1959: The Beginning of Beyond") in The Cambridge Companion to Jazz (2003).

After moving to London in 2005, Brubeck taught courses at the Guildhall School of Music and Drama and Brunel University. Appointed as a Fulbright Senior Specialist in Jazz Studies in 2007, he taught at Yıldız Technical University in Istanbul and subsequently at the Gheorghe Dima Music Academy in Cluj-Napoca, Romania, in 2010.

Brubeck has received six Outstanding Service to Jazz Education awards from the International Association for Jazz Education (IAJE) in 1988, 1992, 1994, 1998, 2005, and 2006. He regularly contributes papers to conferences related to jazz studies and retains an academic affiliation of Honorary Professor with the University of KwaZulu-Natal.

=== Jazz in South Africa (1980s – early 2000s) ===
==== University bands in South Africa ====
Brubeck formed five student/staff bands that officially represented the University of Natal (KwaZulu-Natal) and South Africa at International Association for Jazz Education (IAJE) and other international conferences and festivals. The first, the Jazzanians, was formed in 1988 and was the first multi-racial student jazz band from a South African university. The publicity resulting from their appearance at the National Association of Jazz Educators Conference in Detroit and on American TV helped further jazz education in South Africa.

The album The Jazzanians: We Have Waited Too Long (2024) was recorded in Durban in 1988. The album was re-mastered in 2024 for Ubuntu Music. The NU Jazz Connection (1992) which performed at the IAJE Conference in Miami also made an album, African Tributes for B&W Music.

==== Afro Cool Concept ====
In 1989, Brubeck formed the Afro Cool Concept, which toured southern Africa and internationally for nearly 15 years. In 1990, they recorded Afro-Cool Concept: Live in New Orleans, featuring Barney Rachabane on alto sax, Victor Ntoni on bass, and Lulu Gontsana on drums. Ntoni later moved to Johannesburg and bassist Bongani Sokhela joined the group. Brubeck, Ntoni and Gontsana backed tenor sax players Winston Mankunku Ngozi, Ezra Ngcukana, and Duke Makasi, and guitarists Allen Kwela, Johnny Fourie and Sandile Shange in Durban and at the National Arts Festival in Grahamstown. In 2004, Afro Cool Concept presented concerts in England, Denmark, and the United States.

In 1993, B&W Music released Gathering Forces 2, an album featuring Brubeck and bansuri player Deepak Ram at the Durban International Festival of Music. The independent South African record label Sheer Sound released Afro-Cool Concept's Still On My Mind in 2003, and Darius Brubeck albums, Before It’s Too Late (2004) and Tugela Rail and Other Tracks (2007).

==== Other jazz bands in South Africa ====
During the 1990s and early 2000s, Brubeck led a variety of ad hoc bands based in Durban, with saxophonists including Mike Rossi, Chris Merz, and Zim Ngqawana.

Brubeck formed the NU Jazz Connection in 1992, which consisted of himself and Mark Kilian on keyboards; Chris Merz on saxophone; and five students: Fezile Faku on trumpet, Lex Futshane on acoustic and electric bass, S’Thembiso Ntuli on tenor sax, Sazi Dlamini on guitar, and Lulu Gontsana on drums. NU Jazz Connection toured to Peru in 1999, performing in Cuzco and Lima.

In 2003, Brubeck also directed the South African National Youth Jazz Band at the North Sea Jazz Festival in the Netherlands. In 2005, he led a band of students from the University of Cape Town and the University of KwaZulu-Natal at the IAJE Conference in Long Beach, California. He often returns to South Africa and performs with local musicians, most recently in 2023, when the NU Jazz Connection was reconvened for the launch of the Brubecks’ book at the Centre for Jazz and Popular Music on the UKZN Durban campus.

=== International jazz pianist and bandleader (late 2000s – present) ===
Brubeck has performed across the globe. Major appearances include the 2007 and 2008 Cape Town International Jazz Festival, the Kennedy Center Honors Gala Concert in 2009, the Edinburgh Festival in 2013, and Jazz at Lincoln Center in 2014.

The Darius Brubeck Quartet regularly appears at jazz festivals and concert venues in the UK, Europe, and the Middle East and are regulars at London jazz venues including Ronnie Scott's Club, PizzaExpress Jazz Club, and The Jazz Cafe.

Brubecks Play Brubeck, a group featuring three Brubeck brothers and British saxophonist Dave O'Higgins, has been touring annually since 2010.

In February 2023, Darius and his brothers participated in a performance of The Gates of Justice, a cantata composed by their parents. The performance was part of a week-long conference, "Music and Justice", organized by the Lowell Milken Center for Music of American Jewish Experience at the UCLA Herb Alpert School of Music.

== Composer ==
Brubeck has written music for all types of ensemble, large and small. Two of his compositions, For Lydia (2013–14) and Tugela Rail (2019–20), have been included in the Royal School's international piano syllabus.

In addition to writing for his own bands, Darius Brubeck's arrangements and an original composition for his father's 80th birthday can be heard on Dave Brubeck – Live with the LSO (2000).

In 2004, the Lincoln Center Jazz Orchestra commissioned a piece by Brubeck and Zim Ngqawana for "Let Freedom Swing", a setting of music to extracts from speeches by Nelson Mandela and Desmond Tutu. The texts were read by Morgan Freeman at the premiere in New York City.

In 2005, the Rockefeller Foundation awarded Brubeck a residency as a composer at the Bellagio Study and Conference Center in Italy.

He is co-author with Michael Rossi of Odd Times: Uncommon Etudes in for Uncommon Time Signatures, published by Advance Music in 2014.

== Gathering Forces ==
Gathering Forces was the name of Brubeck's fusion band in the 1970s and early 1980s. He has since adopted the name for a label of self-published material.

The label has released numerous albums including For Lydia and the Lion and Earthrise (2008), Two and Four (2010), Brubecks Play Brubeck (2011), Cathy's Summer (2014), Years Ago (2016), and The Darius Brubeck Quartet: Live in Poland (2019).

== Discography ==
| Year released | Title | Label | Personnel/Notes |
|---|---|---|---|
| 1972 | Chaplin's Back | Paramount Records (PAS-6026) | Darius Brubeck (piano, electric piano, synths, vibraphone) Perry Robinson (clarinet) Bob Fritz (clarinet, e. clarinet, bass clarinet) Michael Brecker (tenor saxophone) Amos Garrett (electric guitar) Bob Rose (acoustic and electric guitar) Richard Bock (cello and string arr.) John Miller (electric bass, acoustic bass) Muruga Bookvich (drums, perc.) Producer: Gary Klein |
| 1973 | Two Generations of Brubeck | Atlantic Records (SD 1645) | Two Generations of Brubeck: Dave Brubeck (piano); Darius Brubeck (Fender Rhodes & synths); Chris Brubeck (trombone & electric bass); Dan Brubeck (drums)with Peter Madcat Ruth (harmonica), Perry Robinson (clarinet), Jerry Bergonzi (tenor & soprano sax) |
| 1974 | Brother the Great Spirit Made Us All | Atlantic Records (SD 1660) | Two Generations of Brubeck: Dave Brubeck (piano); Darius Brubeck (Fender Rhodes & synths); Chris Brubeck (trombone & electric bass); Dan Brubeck (drums)with Peter Madcat Ruth (harmonica), Perry Robinson (clarinet), Jerry Bergonzi (tenor & soprano sax) |
| 1978 | A Cut Above! | Direct-Disk Labs (DD 106) | The New Brubeck Quartet: Dave Brubeck (piano); Darius Brubeck (electric piano, synths); Chris Brubeck (electric bass, bass trombone); Danny Brubeck (drums) |
| 1978 | The New Brubeck Quartet Live at Montreux | Tomato Records (TOM-7018) | The New Brubeck Quartet: Dave Brubeck (piano); Darius Brubeck (electric piano, synths); Chris Brubeck (electric bass, bass trombone); Danny Brubeck (drums) |
| 1978 | Better Than Live | Direct-Disk Labs (DD 109) | Larry Coryell and the Brubeck Brothers: Larry Coryell (electric guitar, acoustic guitar); Darius Brubeck (piano, Fender Rhodes, synths); Chris Brubeck (electric bass); Dan Brubeck (drums, percussion) |
| 1979 | Return | Vanguard Records (064 CRY 63 396) | Larry Coryell and the Brubeck Brothers: Larry Coryell (electric guitar, acoustic guitar); Darius Brubeck (piano, Fender Rhodes, synths); Chris Brubeck (electric bass); Dan Brubeck (drums); Ray Mantilla (percussion) |
| 1990 | Live at New Orleans Jazz & Heritage Festival 1990 | B&W Music (BW024) | Darius Brubeck and Afro Cool Concept: Darius Brubeck (piano); Barney Rachabane (soprano & alto saxophone); Victor Ntoni (bass); Lulu Gontsana (drums) |
| 1992 | Gathering Forces I | B&W Music (BW022) | Darius Brubeck (piano and synths); Bob Hanlon (saxes); Nelson Bogart (electric guitar & vocals); Christopher Bishop (electric bass & vocals); Dan Brubeck (drums); Nelson Bogart (trumpet); Recorded in 1980. |
| 1992 | African Tributes | B&W Music (BW023) | The NU Jazz Connection: Darius Brubeck (keyboard); Mark Kilian (electric keyboards); Chris Merz (sax); Fezile Faku (trumpet); Lex Futshane (acoustic and electric bass,); S’Thembiso Ntuli (tenor sax); Sazi Dlamini (guitar); Lulu Gontsana (drums) |
| 1994 | Gathering Forces II | B&W Music (BW046) | Darius Brubeck (piano) Deepak Ram (bansuri) Stacey van Skalkwyk (fulte) Chris Merz (soprano sax) Zim Ngqawana (alto sax) Mike Rossi (tenor sax) Candace Whitehead (violin) Brendan Jury (viola) Matthew Brubeck (cello) Mark Kilian (synth) Concord Nkabinde (electric bass) Bhisham Bridglall (tabla) Airto Moreira (percussion) Kevin Gibson (drums) |
| 1997 | In Their Own Sweet Way | Telarc (CD-83355) | Dave Brubeck (piano); Darius Brubeck (piano, electric piano, synths); Chris Brubeck (electric bass, bass trombone); Matthew Brubeck (cello); Dan Brubeck (drums) |
| 2001 | Dave Brubeck — Live with the London Symphony Orchestra | LSO Live (LSO 0011) | London Symphony Orchestra, conducted by Russell Gloyd: Dave Brubeck, piano; Darius Brubeck, piano; Chris Brubeck, bass trombone, electric bass; Matthew Brubeck, cello; Dan Brubeck, drums; Bobby Militello, alto sax, flute; Alec Dankworth, bass |
| 2003 | Still On My Mind | Sheer Sound | Darius Brubeck and Afro Cool Concept: Darius Brubeck (piano); Barney Rachabane (soprano & alto saxophone); Bongani Sokhela (bass); Lulu Gontsana (drums) |
| 2005 | Before It's Too Late | Sheer Sound | Darius Brubeck (piano); Debbie Mari (voice); Deepak Ram (bansuri); Chris Merz (soprano sax); Zim Ngqawana (alto sax); Mike Rossi (tenor sax); Brendan Jury (viola); Mark Kilian (synth); Lex Futshane (acoustic bass); Concord Nkabinde (e.bass); Sanjith Singh (tabla); Kevin Gibson (drums) |
| 2007 | Tugela Rail and Other Tracks | Sheer Sound | Anthology of Darius Brubeck on Sheer Sound albums |
| 2008 | For Lydia and the Lion | Ubuntu Music; Gathering Forces (GF 3) | The Darius Brubeck Quartet: Darius Brubeck (piano, Fender Rhodes); Mike Rossi (saxophones); Matt Ridley (bass); Wesley Gibbens (drums) |
| 2011 | Two and Four/To and Fro | Ubuntu Music; Gathering Forces (GF 4) | The Darius Brubeck Quartet: Darius Brubeck (piano); Mike Rossi (saxophone); Matt Ridley (bass); Wesley Gibbens (drums) |
| 2011 | Brubecks Play Brubeck | Ubuntu Music; Gathering Forces (GF 5) | Brubecks Play Brubeck: Darius Brubeck, piano; Dave O'Higgins, saxophone; Chris Brubeck, bass, trombone; Dan Brubeck, drums |
| 2014 | Cathy's Summer | Ubuntu Music; Gathering Forces (GF 6) | The Darius Brubeck Quartet: Darius Brubeck, piano; Dave O'Higgins, saxophone; Matt Ridley, bass; Wesley Gibbens, drums |
| 2016 | Years Ago | Ubuntu Music; Gathering Forces (GF 7) | The Darius Brubeck Quartet: Darius Brubeck, piano; Dave O'Higgins, saxophone; Matt Ridley, bass; Wesley Gibbens, drums |
| 2019 | Live in Poland | Ubuntu Music (UBU0033) | The Darius Brubeck Quartet: Darius Brubeck, piano; Dave O'Higgins, saxophone; Matt Ridley, bass; Wesley Gibbens, drums |

== Awards and distinctions ==
- STIAS (Stellenbosch Institute for Advanced Study) Artist-in-Residence (2017, 2019)
- Fulbright Senior Specialist (2007 – 2012), with visiting professorships in Turkey (2007) and Romania (2010)
- Rockefeller Foundation – Bellagio Project Residency (2005)
- International Association of Jazz Educators (IAJE) - Outstanding Service to Jazz Education (1988, 1992, 1994, 1998, 2005, 2006)
  - Executive Board of IAJE (2006 – 08)
- Berklee College of Music, Boston – Accomplishment in Contemporary Music (1998)

== Bibliography (published writings) ==
Brubeck, Darius, & Catherine Brubeck, Playing the Changes: Jazz at an African University and on the Road, UKZN Press, 2023; University of Illinois Press, 2024.

Brubeck, Darius, "Better Than Perfect: Dave Brubeck and The Aesthetics of Imperfection", in A. Hamilton, L. Pearson (eds), The Aesthetics of Imperfection in Music and the Arts: Spontaneity, Flaws and the Unfinished, London: Bloomsbury Academic, 2020.

Rossi, Michael, & Darius Brubeck, Odd Times: Uncommon Etudes for Uncommon Time Signatures, Advance Music, 2015.

Brubeck, Darius, "1959: The Beginning of Beyond", in Cooke & Horn (eds), The Cambridge Companion to Jazz, Cambridge University Press, 2002.

Brubeck, Darius, & Catherine Brubeck, 15 entries on South African musicians in B. Kernfeld (ed.), The New Grove Dictionary of Jazz, London: Macmillan: second edition, 2002.
