= Two Generations of Brubeck =

Studio album by Dave Brubeck
- Released: 1973
- Recorded: August 1973
- Studio: C.I. Studios, New York City
- Genre: Jazz
- Length: 43:07
- Label: Atlantic - SD 1645
- Producer: Michael Cuscuna

Dave Brubeck chronology
We're All Together Again for the First Time (1973)	Two Generations of Brubeck (1973)	Brother, the Great Spirit Made Us All (1974)

Two Generations of Brubeck is a 1973 studio album by Dave Brubeck accompanied by his sons Darius, Chris and Dan.

== Reception ==
Professional ratings
Review scores
Source	Rating
Allmusic	3/5 stars
The Penguin Guide to Jazz Recordings	3/4 stars

The album was reviewed by Scott Yanow at Allmusic who wrote that the musicians "This very interesting set features the pianist with three of his sons...To hear such numbers as "Three to Get Ready," "Blue Rondo à la Turk" and "Unsquare Dance" (along with some newer pieces) performed by these younger players casts new light on the durability and flexibility of these classic Brubeck songs."

== Track listing ==
1. "Circadian Dysrhythmia" - 3:24
2. "Three to Get Ready" - 4:18
3. "Blue Rondo à la Turk" - 7:58
4. "Unsquare Dance" - 2:47
5. "The Holy One" - 3:38
6. "Call of the Wild" (Perry Robinson) - 3:00
7. "Knives" - 4:22
8. "Tin Sink" (Darius Brubeck) - 8:32
9. "Thank You (Dziekuje)" - 5:29

All compositions by Dave Brubeck, other composers indicated.

== Personnel ==
- Dave Brubeck - piano, electric piano
- Darius Brubeck - electric piano, piano, clavinet
- Jerry Bergonzi - soprano saxophone, tenor saxophone
- Chris Brubeck - electric bass, trombone
- Dan Brubeck - drums
- Randie Powell - percussion
- David Powell - double bass
- Perry Robinson - clarinet
- Peter "Madcat" Ruth - harmonica
- Michael Cuscuna - producer, liner notes
- Chick Corea - liner notes
- David Dutemple - electric bass
- Richie Morales - drums
- Stephan Dudash - violin
- Dave Mason - guitar
- Jimmy Cathcart - electric piano
