= Gil Noble =

African-American television journalist and personality (1932–2012)

- Born: Gilbert Edward Noble; February 22, 1932; Harlem, New York, U.S.
- Died: April 5, 2012 (aged 80); Wayne, New Jersey U.S.
- Occupation: Journalist

Gilbert Edward "Gil" Noble (February 22, 1932 – April 5, 2012) was an American television reporter and interviewer. He was the producer and host of New York City television station WABC-TV's weekly show Like It Is, originally co-hosted by Robert Hooks. The program focused primarily on issues concerning African Americans and those within the African diaspora.

After graduating from the City College of New York he worked for Union Carbide.

== Broadcast journalism career ==
In 1962, Noble got his professional break into broadcast media when he was hired as a part-time announcer at WLIB radio. He began reading and reporting newscasts. He joined WABC-TV in July 1967 as a reporter, after reporting on the 1967 Newark riots. Starting in January 1968, he became an anchor of its Saturday and Sunday night newscasts. He became host of Like It Is a few months prior to the rebranding of the station's newscasts as Eyewitness News in November 1968. In addition, he was an occasional interviewer on some of WABC's other public affairs shows, such as Eyewitness Exclusive. From 1986 on, Noble concentrated exclusively on Like It Is. Noble also created documentaries on such topics as W. E. B. Du Bois, Malcolm X, Fannie Lou Hamer, Ella Baker, Decade of Struggle, Martin Luther King Jr., Adam Clayton Powell Jr., Jack Johnson, Charlie Parker and the documentary Essay on Drugs. In 1977, he wrote, directed and produced the first documentary on Paul Robeson, entitled The Tallest Tree in Our Forest.

In 1973, Noble reported (for local TV station WABC channel 7) on the first mobile cellular phone invented by Marty Cooper from the NY Hilton in New York. In 1981, he wrote an autobiography, Black is the Color of My TV Tube. He was a member of the board of directors of the Jazz Foundation of America, hosting the 2001, 2002, 2003, 2004 and 2007 "A Great Night in Harlem" Concert/Benefit for The Jazz Foundation to support The Musicians Emergency Fund. He won seven Emmy Awards and 650 community awards, and was granted five honorary doctorates.

== Personal life ==
Noble was born in Harlem to Jamaican immigrant parents, Gilbert, the owner of an auto repair shop, and Iris Noble, a school teacher. During the Korean War, he was drafted into the United States Army.

In July 2011, Noble suffered a stroke. In late September, his family announced that he would not be returning to host Like It Is. The program ended its 43-year run the following month. His television station, WABC-TV, announced his death on April 5, 2012. He was 80 years old.

== See also ==
- List of WABC-TV personalities
