= Like It Is (TV series) =

- Presented by: Gil Noble
- Country of origin: United States

Production
- Running time: 30–60 minutes
- Production company: WABC-TV

Original release
- Network: WABC-TV
- Release: June 2, 1968 – October 23, 2011

Like It Is was a public affairs television program focusing on issues relevant to the African-American community, produced and aired on WABC-TV in New York City between 1968 and 2011. It was one of the longest-running, locally produced programs of its kind in television history. In spite of being aired only in the New York area, Like It Is achieved wide acclaim nationally based on the renown of its topics and interview subjects.

Like It Is was originally co-hosted by actor Robert Hooks and WABC-TV news reporter Gil Noble. Noble eventually became sole host, and produced the series after 1975.

== History ==
Within the backdrop of the Civil Rights and Black power movements, the program was created by WABC-TV to fill a void in black-oriented programming. In its earlier days Like It Is focused primarily on black celebrities; later it would focus entirely on politically related matters after Noble became sole host and producer. As host and interviewer Noble exercised a low-key style, often subtly playing devil's advocate in an effort to get the most out of his guests. For a time Like It Is was also co-hosted by Melba Tolliver. The program won seven New York-area Emmy Awards.

Along with discussions on current events, Like It Is featured full-length interviews with many prominent African, African-American and Afro-Caribbean political and cultural figures of the 20th Century during the course of its run. This list includes:

- Ralph Abernathy
- Muhammad Ali
- Arthur Ashe
- Amiri Baraka
- Yosef Ben-Jochannan
- Maurice Bishop
- H. Rap Brown
- Jim Brown
- Stokely Carmichael (Kwame Ture)
- John Henrik Clarke
- Bill Cosby
- Sammy Davis Jr.
- Billy Eckstine
- Louis Farrakhan
- Aretha Franklin
- Lena Horne
- Jesse Jackson
- Leonard Jeffries
- Michael Manley
- Bob Marley
- Robert Mugabe
- Sidney Poitier
- Adam Clayton Powell Jr.
- Leontyne Price
- Max Roach
- David Ruffin
- Al Sharpton
- Fred Shuttlesworth
- Chuck Stone
- Billy Taylor
- Sarah Vaughan
- Andrew Young

Other episodes have featured Noble presenting archival material on figures such as Martin Luther King Jr., W. E. B. Du Bois, Malcolm X, Paul Robeson, Fannie Lou Hamer, Jack Johnson, Joe Louis, and many others. Special episodes were also devoted to single topics, such as the civil rights movement, the Harlem Renaissance, and the effects of drug use, particularly that of heroin, in the Black community.

== Scheduling ==
Like It Is aired on Saturday, and later Sunday afternoons. Later, it was part of a dedicated two-hour block of public affairs programming on WABC-TV, paired with Up Close with Diana Williams and the Latino-focused Tiempo. This block was notable as most television stations no longer devote such a large amount of airtime to such programming, and if so relegate these programs to early-morning weekend time slots. WABC-TV scheduled these three programs between 11:00 A.M. and 1:00 P.M. on Sundays.

Like It Is was occasionally preempted for network sports coverage, but preemptions became more common when ABC acquired NBA coverage (though corporate cousin ESPN) for Sunday afternoons in 2002. As a result, during basketball season Like It Is was reduced from a full hour to 30 minutes some weeks (to accommodate a pregame show), and did not air altogether on others. Largely due to the preemptions caused by basketball, rumors abounded that WABC-TV was being pressured by corporate parent Disney to cancel the program. If that were the case, such plans were scrapped due to a large outcry from viewers and community leaders.

Like It Is was put on production hiatus in August 2011, after Gil Noble suffered a severe stroke. In October 2011 Noble's family announced that he would not return to the program, ending Like It Is' 43-year run. The series concluded on October 16, 2011, with a tribute program hosted by Lori Stokes. The episode featured appearances from past guests including Leontyne Price, Bill Cosby, Danny Glover, and others who shared their memories and thoughts on the significant role Like It Is, and by extension Gil Noble, played in the advancement and preservation of the African-American experience. This program was repeated the following week.

WABC-TV premiered a new African-American public affairs show, titled Here and Now, in the Like It Is time slot on October 30, 2011.
