= Monchoachi =

French writer

- Born: André Pierre-Louis; 1946 (age 79–80); Saint-Esprit, Martinique
- Occupations: Writer, poet, translator
- Writing career
- Language: French, Martinican Creole
- Notable work: L'espère-geste

Monchoachi is a French writer, born in 1946 in Saint-Esprit, Martinique. In 2003, he won the Carbet Caribbean Prize and the Max Jacob Prize for L'Espère-geste. Samuel Beckett's Endgame and Waiting for Godot are among the plays he has translated into Martinican Creole.

Monchoachi is also the founder of Lakouzémi, a political magazine and an annual political and poetic meeting which ran from 2007 to 2009. Its three annual meeting days saw poets meet in cockfighting arenas to talk, dance, recite and exchange ideas.

In an interview with the political review site Lundi matin, he spoke about the significance of the timing of these events:

- 15 August – Ceremony at the Bois Caiman, 1791,
- First Saturday in December – Columbus' arrival in the Lesser Antilles, 1493,
- 18 June – Treaty of Basseterre between Europeans and Kalinagos recognising the Kalinago nation, 1660.

== Works ==
In Martinican Creole

- Dissidans’, La Ligue, 1980
- Konpè lawouzé, Impr. Libres, 1979
- Nostrom, Paris, Éditions caribéennes, 1982
- Bèl-bèl zobèl, Imprimerie Desormeaux, 1983
- Samuel Beckett, La ka èspéré Godot, traduction de En attendant Godot par Monchoachi, New legend, 2002
- Samuel Beckett, Jé-a bout, traduction de Fin de partie par Monchoachi, New legend, 2002
- Lakouzémi, avec Georges-Henri Léotin, Juliette Smeralda-Amon, Lakouasos, 2007

French

- Nuit gagée; suivi de Quelle langue parle le poète, Schœlcher, Presses universitaires créoles-GEREC; Paris, l'Harmattan, 1992
- La Case où se tient la lune, Bordeaux, William Blake & Co, 2002
- L'espère-geste, Sens, Obsidiane, 2002
- Paris Caraïbe : le voyage des sens, Atlantica, 2002
- Lémistè, Obsidiane 2012
- Partition noire et bleue (Lémistè 2), Obsidiane 2016
- Fugue vs Fug (Lémistè 3), Obsidiane 2021
- Retour à la parole sauvage, Lundimatin 2023

=== Bibliography ===
- Georges-Henri Léotin, Monchoachi, preface by Raphaël Confiant, Schœlcher, Presses universitaires créoles-GEREC; Paris, Ed. l'Harmattan, 1994
- Entretien avec Monchoachi: la parole sauvage à l'assaut de l'occident, Lundi Matin, No. 72, 14 September 2016.
