= Burton Greene =

American jazz pianist (1937–2021)

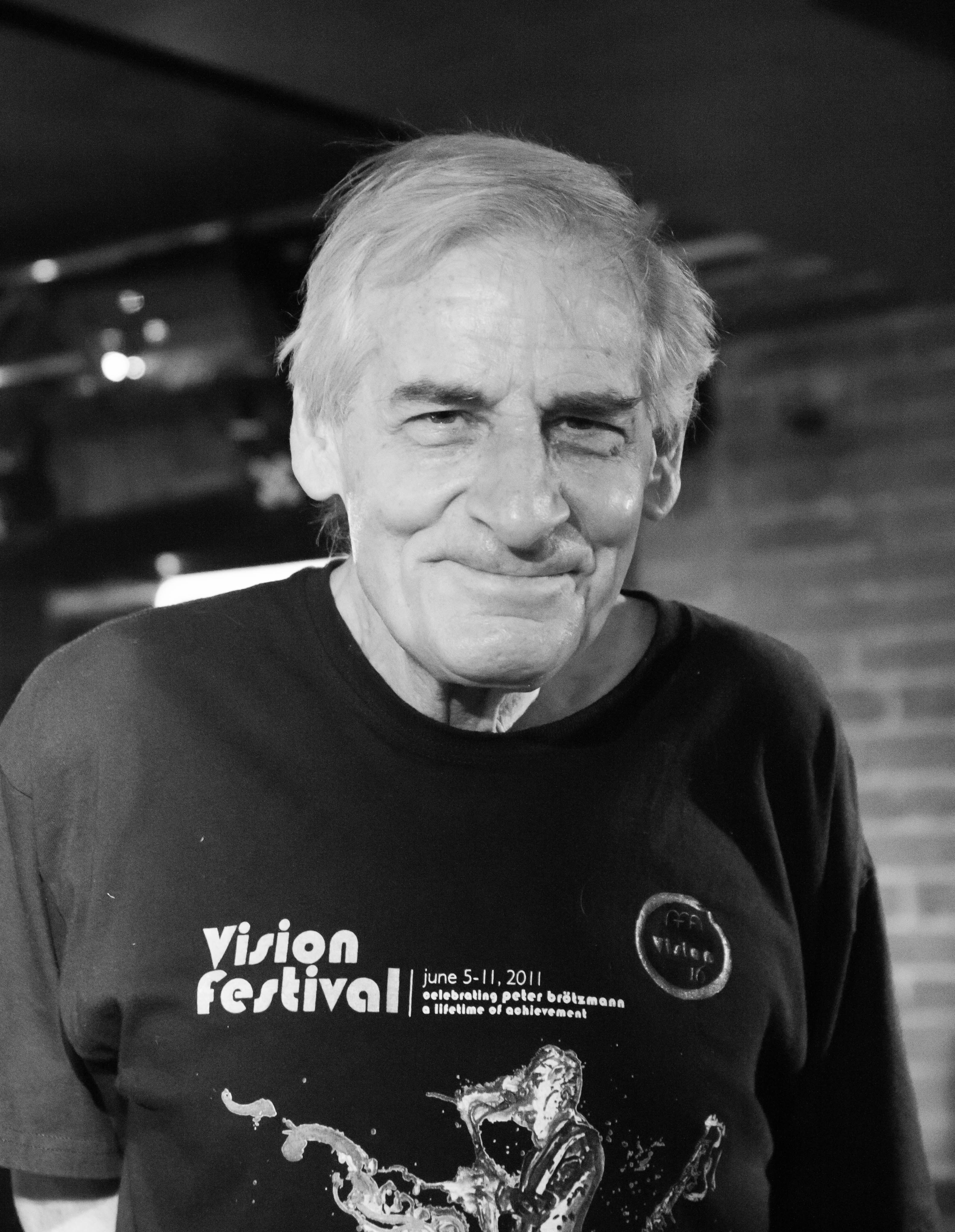

Background information
- Born: June 14, 1937
- Died: June 28, 2021 (aged 84)
- Genres: jazz, klezmer
- Instruments: piano
- Website: http://www.burtongreene.com

Burton Greene (June 14, 1937 – June 28, 2021) was an American free jazz pianist born in Chicago, Illinois, though most known for his work in New York City. He explored multiple genres, including avant-garde jazz and the Klezmer medium.

== Biography ==
Greene played during the 1960s on New York's free jazz scene, gigging with musicians including Alan Silva and Marion Brown, among others. With Alan Silva he formed the Free Form Improvisation Ensemble in 1963. He joined Bill Dixon's and Cecil Taylor's Jazz Composers Guild in 1964, and also performed with Rashied Ali, Albert Ayler, Gato Barbieri, Byard Lancaster, Sam Rivers, Patty Waters, and others. During this time, he recorded two albums under his own name for ESP-Disk.

He moved to Europe in 1969, initially to Paris. Later, he lived in Amsterdam and played with such Dutch musicians as Maarten Altena and Willem Breuker. During the late 1980s, he began exploring the Klezmer tradition in his groups Klezmokum (along with Perry Robinson), Klez-thetics, and a later group called Klez-Edge with vocalist Marek Balata. Klez-Edge has a recording Ancestors, Mindreles, NaGila Monsters (2008) on John Zorn's Tzadik label. A duet with Perry Robinson, also on the Tzadik label, Two Voices in the Desert was released in January 2009.

From the mid-1990s, Greene performed and recorded in New York and along the East Coast. Greene's performance and recorded groups based in New York from this time include a duet with bassist Mark Dresser; a quartet with trumpeter Roy Campbell Jr., Lou Grassi and Adam Lane; a trio with Ed and George Schuller on bass and drums (recorded on the CIMP label); and a quintet with the Schuller brothers, Russ Nolan on saxes and flute and Paul Smoker on trumpet. His autobiography written over 20 years, Memoirs of a Musical Pesty-Mystic, was published in 2001 (Cadence Jazz Books).

Greene died on his boat in Amsterdam.

== Discography ==
- Burton Greene Quartet (ESP Disk, 1966)
- Presenting Burton Greene (Columbia, 1968)
- On Tour (ESP Disk, 1968)
- Aquariana (BYG, 1969)
- Celesphere (Futura, 1970)
- Mountains (Button-Nose, 1971)
- Trees (Button-Nose, 1973)
- Light (Button-Nose, 1976)
- European Heritage (Circle, 1978)
- It's All One (Horo, 1978)
- The Past Is Also in the Future (All Life, 1978)
- Variations On a Coffee Machine (Kharma, 1978)
- Structures (Circle, 1978)
- Firmanence (Fore, 1980)
- The Ongoing Strings (Hat Hut, 1981)
- Lady Bug Dance (Cat, 1981)
- Zephyr (Button-Nose, 1983)
- One World Music (Cat, 1984)
- Valencia Chocolate (Cat, 1985)
- Solo Orchestra in Real Time (Nimbus West, 1989)
- Shades of Greene (Cadence, 1998)
- The Free Form Improvisation Ensemble (Cadence, 1998)
- Throptics (CIMP, 1999)
- Peace Beyond Conflict (CIMP, 2002)
- Calistrophy (BV Haast, 2002)
- Live at Grasland (Drimala, 2004)
- Roy Campbell Quartet Isms Out (CIMP, 2004)
- Ins and Outs (CIMP, 2006)
- Live at the Woodstock Playhouse 1965 (Porter, 2010)
- Live at Kerrytown House (NoBusiness, 2012)
- Burton's Time (CIMP, 2014)
- Open Field + Burton Greene (Cipsela, 2015)
- Compendium (Improvising Beings, 2017)
- Post Monk Songbook (Cadence, 2019)
- Life's Intense Mystery (Astral Spirits, 2019)
