= My Yiddishe Momme =

1925 song by Jack Yellen and Lew Pollack

My Yiddishe Momme (Yiddish: א יידישע מאמע) is a song written by Jack Yellen (words and music) and Lew Pollack (music), first recorded by Willie Howard, and made famous in vaudeville by Belle Baker and by Sophie Tucker, and later by the Barry Sisters. Tucker began singing My Yiddishe Momme in 1925, after the death of her own mother. She later dedicated her autobiography Some of These Days to Yellen, "A grand song writer, and a grander friend". "Sophie Tucker made 'Mama' a top 5 U.S. hit in 1928, English on one side and Yiddish on the B-side. Leo Fuld combined both in one track and made it a hit in the rest of the world." It was the signature song of British comedian Issy Bonn.

== Analysis ==
The song, in English and Yiddish, is sadder in the original Yiddish than in the English translation. The mother implicitly symbolizes a sense of nostalgia for the "old world", as well as guilt for having left it behind in assimilating into American society.

== Versions ==
There are several versions of the song, under different names:

- "My Yiddishe Mama": by Yiddish star Leo Fuld (in English and Yiddish)
- "On katseessa äidin": by Annikki Tähti (in Finnish)
- "The Jewish Mother (A Yiddishe Mamme)": by classical violinist Itzhak Perlman
- "My Yiddishe Momme": pop version by Connie Francis, jazz/bossa nova piano version by the Irving Fields Trio
- "My Yiddishe Momme": by Ruth Maimon in the Mexican movie "Las Canciones Unidas" in 1960.
- "A Yiddishe Mama (A Jewish Mama)": klezmer version by the Maxwell Street Klezmer Band
- "My Yiddishe Momme (Egy őszhajú asszony)" instrumental version by Hungarian guitarist István Faragó. Hungarian lyrics by Dénes György Gém, sung by Kató Fényes, János Vámosi and others. This version was prominently featured in the Hungarian film "Eldorado" (1988).
- "My Yiddishe Mama" by Yossele Rosenblatt
- "Mein Idishe Mame" by Marian Hemar, recorded by, among others, Hanka Ordonówna and Hanna Skarżanka. Hemar's lyrics are not a translation of the original text, rather, they are a tragic story of a Jewish mother in Poland and her son who immigrated to America.
- "My Yidishe Mame" by Renata Drössler.
- "Židovská máma (My Yiddishe Momme)" in Czech and German versions by Hana Hegerová.

== Recordings ==
Jackie Wilson recorded a version of "My Yiddishe Momme" on You Ain't Heard Nothin' Yet, a tribute album to Al Jolson, with Chorus and Orchestra directed by Dick Jacobs, released on the Brunswick Label in 1961.

The song was included in the 1965 Horst Jankowski album "The Genius of Jankowski!"

Neil Sedaka covered the song in English and Yiddish in 1966.

A Spanish version of the song, titled "A mi madre querida" (To my beloved mother) and containing some of the Yiddish text, was recorded as a bolero in the late 1950s by La Sonora Matancera with Carlos Argentino (who was an Argentinean Jew) singing.

Another Spanish version was made in the early 1970s called "Mi Querida Mama (My beloved Mama)"; it was sung by singer Nino Bravo.

Tom Jones performed a live version on his 1967 album Tom Jones Live! at the Talk of the Town. He reprised this as a duet with John Farnham first on the Australian television show Hey Hey It's Saturday in 1990, and then on the 2005 CD/DVD album Together in Concert.

French singer Charles Aznavour recorded a French version on 16 March 2003, on his album Plus bleu.

Ray Charles performed a short cover version of the song in a fifth-season episode of The Nanny, wherein he plays the fiancé of Fran Fine's Jewish grandmother, Yetta.

Ivan Rebroff sang a German version (Mutters Hände) in 1981.

Alexander Goldscheider sang a Czech version Můj židovský táta in which he converted his lyrics to My Yiddishe Tate in 2021.

Salim Halali (1920-2005), a Jewish-Algerian singer who lived in France, released a version in Arabic in the late 1960s https://www.youtube.com/watch?v=kX4RkDa7tl0
