= Gerhard Narholz =

Austrian-American composer, arranger and conductor

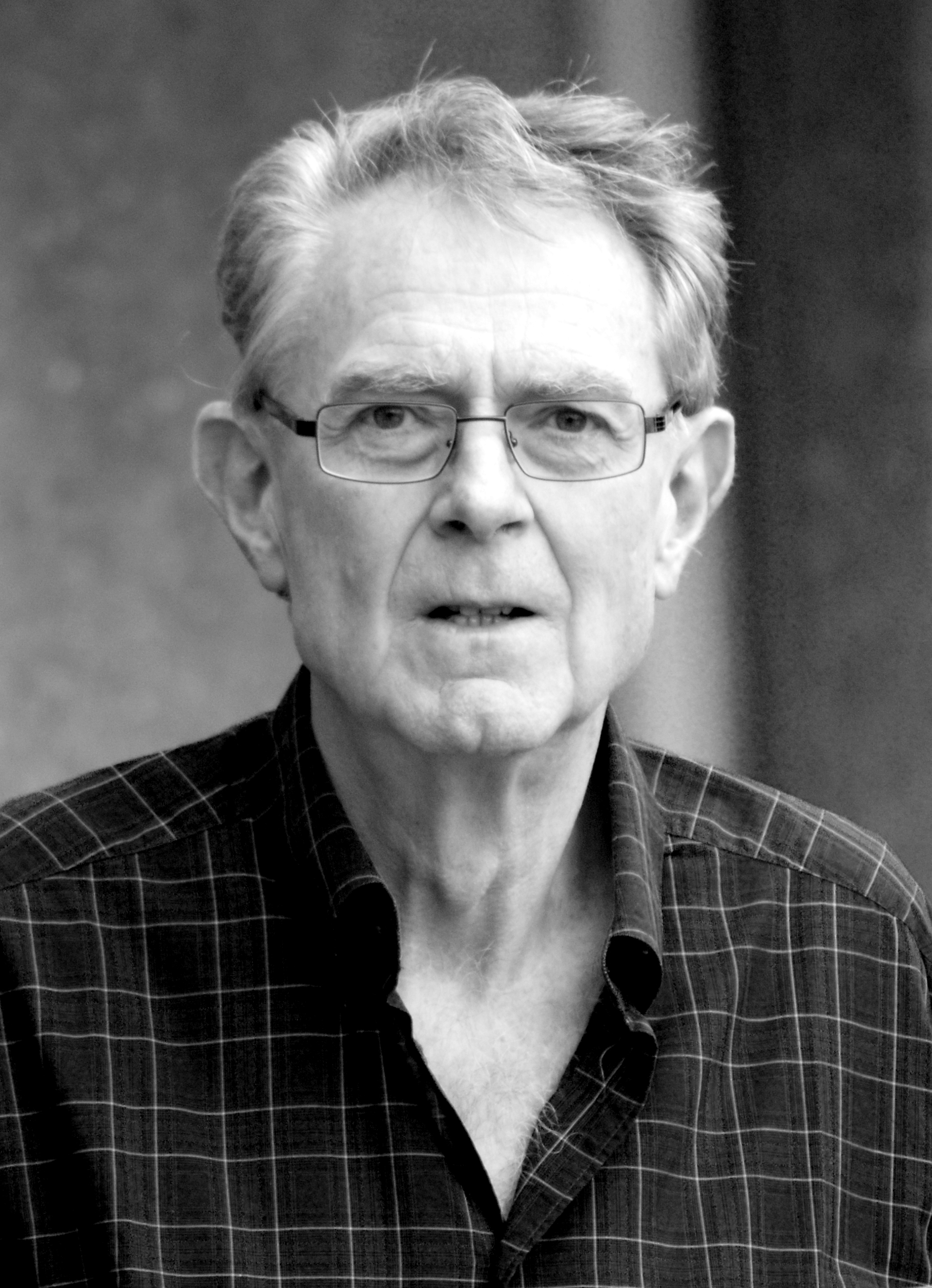
- Narholz in 2008

Background information
- Also known as: Sammy Burndson; Norman Candler; John Epping; Paul Prennessel; Otto Sieben; Tony Tape
- Born: Gerhard Otto Narholz; June 9, 1937 (age 89); Vöcklabruck, Austria
- Education: Viennese Music Academy
- Genres: Jazz; easy listening; orchestral pop
- Occupations: Composer; conductor; arranger
- Years active: 1954–present
- Spouse: Rotheide "Heidi" Narholz (m. 1965)

Gerhard Otto Narholz (born June 9, 1937) is an Austrian-American composer, arranger and conductor, best known as the co-founder of the music library Sonoton.

== Early life ==
Gerhard Otto Narholz was born on June 9, 1937 in Vöcklabruck, Austria, a large town in Upper Austria. Narholz described his father, who was a pottery factory owner, as "very musical", with Narholz being forced to practice the piano at a young age. Narholz has cited jazz as the genre that interested him in music. During his childhood, he frequently listened to Voice of America on the radio and has cited Stan Kenton among his earliest influences. Alongside his musical career, Narholz's father wanted his son to have a "proper profession". Narholz earned a degree in teaching in the 1950s, but gave up his teaching career to study classical composition at the Viennese Music Academy.

== Career ==
=== Early years ===
"[I]t was popular to produce the so-called Heimatfilm – films based on popular songs, with a little story. Those films weren’t necessarily produced to please viewers with a story, but rather to make the songs popular. My songs got into these movies, and I started writing the music for such films."

— Narholz, on his music's early usage

Narholz began to write songs as a teenager. He released his debut single at the age of 17, and began writing German pop songs by 1958. By the early 1960s, Narholz had over 100 single releases under his name, and he began to compose pop songs for arists such as Petula Clark, Heidi Brühl, and Bill Ramsey. Soon after, Narholz was commissioned to write music for German cinema, composing the music for Die lustigen Weiber von Tirol (1964), Übermut im Salzkammergut (1965) and later Das Mädchen von Hongkong (1973), as well as the TV series John Kling (1965–1970).

=== Sonoton ===
Narholz founded the Sonoton music library with his wife Rotheide in Munich in 1965, shortly after the two got married. The name is derived from combining the words "sound and tone", according to Narholz. Sonoton was founded after Narholz realized that his music was "used once or twice, especially in television, then it's off."; before this, production music was not widely available in Germany. Quickly, Sonoton became one of the leading companies in the music library scene.

He also produced various instrumental pop albums for Polydor Germany and Tokyo (under his Otto Sieben pseudonym). Between 1970 and 1980, Narholz arranged, produced and conducted numerous LPs with large string orchestra under his Norman Candler pseudonym for Decca Records / Telefunken, Germany and King Records, Tokyo. In 1971, Norman Candler received the "3 Star Award" from BBC London for "Best Album of the Year".

Narholz founded the record label Pro Viva, which is dedicated to contemporary classical music of living composers. He composed and produced easy listening albums for Sonoton and Intersound with artists such as Billy May, Horst Jankowski, Nelson Riddle, Les Brown, Ted Heath, Acker Bilk, Xavier Cugat, Geoff Bastow, and Franck Pourcel.

== Legacy ==
Narholz is the recipient of the inagural Hall of Fame Award from the Production Music Association. The award was accepted by his son, Gregor, on behalf of Narholz, who was in Istanbul at the time, at the Directors Guild of America in Los Angeles on September 9, 2015. Online video game Roblox signed an agreement with APM Music in 2018 that allowed "access over 1.3 million tracks through the Roblox Toolbox", including many of Narholz's works.

== Personal life ==
Narholz met his future wife, Rotheide "Heidi" Pehofer, while performing at various clubs and pubs throughout Vienna in 1956, when he was 19 and she was 17. Pehofer initially showed no interest in him, saying: "I was never interested in him at all. I thought he was too young. I thought he was just a boy". Pehofer eventually moved away, but the two remained in contact and later reunited in Munich in 1963. They married two years later, in Vienna in 1965. The couple have three sons: Christoph (born 1968), Gregor (born 1969), and Robert (born 1971). The Narholz children were frequently featured on the sleeves for early Sonoton records. Gregor became an accomplished composer like his father, composing the score for The SpongeBob SquarePants Movie (2004), for which he received a nomination for Music in a Feature Production at the 32nd Annie Awards in 2005.
