= Mulrain =

Mulrain is a surname. Notable people with the surname include:

- Gordon Mulrain (fl. 1983), British session musician and music producer
- Sabrina Mulrain (born 1978), German sprinter
