= Wriggle =

Wriggle may refer to:

- Wriggle River, tributary of the River Yeo (South Somerset)
- Wriggle (EP), an EP by American experimental hip hop group Clipping
- Les Wriggles, French music group that formed in 1995

== See also ==
- Wriggler (disambiguation)
