= Wiggler =

Wiggler may refer to:

- Wiggler (Mario), the caterpillar-like creature in the Mario series of games
- Wiggler (JTAG), a parallel port JTAG tool from the Macraigor Systems LLC
- Wiggler (synchrotron), an insertion device for a synchrotron
- Wiggler (tool), a centering tool in metalworking
- Mosquito larva, or wiggler

== See also ==
- Wiggle (disambiguation)
- Wriggler (disambiguation)
