= What's New =

What's New may refer to:

== Music ==
- "What's New?", a song composed by Bob Haggart in 1939
- "What's New", a song by Megan Thee Stallion from Good News
- What's New? (album), by Sonny Rollins, 1962
- What's New (Bill Evans album), 1969
- What's New (Linda Ronstadt album), 1983
- What's New!!!, a Sonny Stitt album, 1966

== Television ==
- What's New? (American TV series), an American PBS daily children's educational program of the 1960s
- What's New (Canadian TV series), a Canadian news and current affairs television series 1972 until at least 1989

== Other ==
- What's New with Phil & Dixie, a comic strip that appeared in Dragon magazine
- What's New (blog), a mathematical blog by Terence Tao
- What's New, a weekly science column by physicist Robert L. Park

== See also ==
- So What's New? (disambiguation)
