= NJC =

NJC may refer to:

- Nathaniel James Clarkson, a British record producer also known as Nat Clarxon
- National Journalism Center, an American political organization
- National Junior College, a junior college in Singapore
- Neuchâtel Junior College, a Canadian international school in Switzerland
- New Jack City, a 1991 crime film starring Wesley Snipes
- New Japan Cup, an annual single-elimination wrestling tournament in NJPW
- New Journal of Chemistry, a scientific journal
- Nizhnevartovsk Airport, the IATA code for Nizhnevartovsk Airport in Nizhnevartovsk, Russia
- Northeastern Junior College, a community college in Sterling, Colorado
