= Alexander Goldscheider =

Czech-born British composer, music producer, and writer

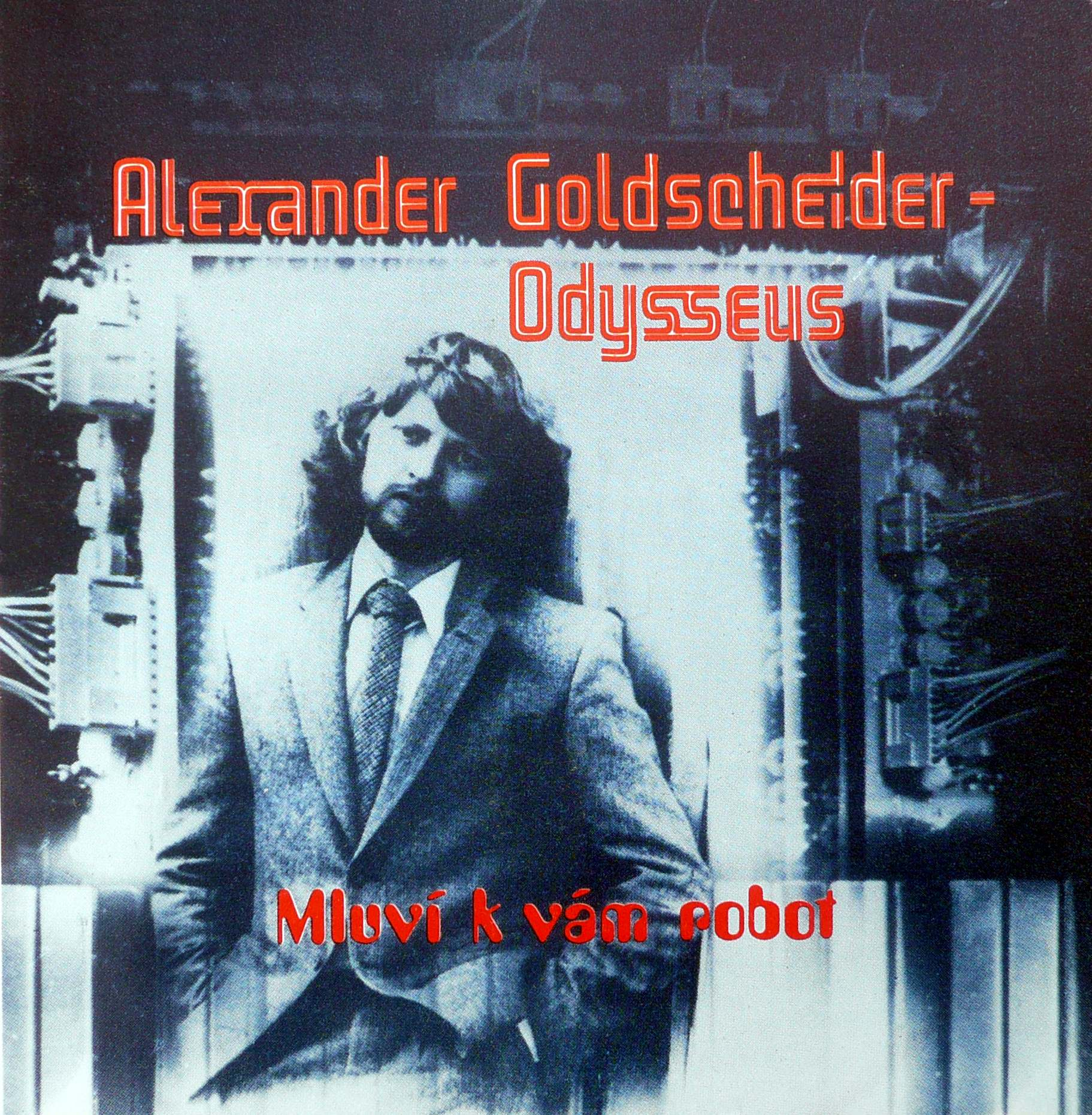
- SP front cover of "A Robot is Talking to You"

Background information
- Born: 22 June 1950 (age 76)
- Origin: Prague, Czechoslovakia
- Genres: Electronic music, Classical music, instrumental music
- Occupations: Composer, producer, writer, computer specialist, photographer
- Instruments: Synthesizer, piano, computers
- Years active: 1968–present
- Labels: Romantic Robot, Supraphon, Panton Records
- Website: www.romantic-robot.com

Alexander Goldscheider (born 22 June 1950) is a Czech-born British composer, music producer, writer, computer specialist and photographer.

== Life and career ==
He studied music at Charles University in Prague and earned a PhDr. in 1975 for his analysis of the music of the Beatles. Initially a music writer, critic, and radio/club DJ (1968–73), he moved into songwriting and music production, becoming a staff producer at Supraphon (1976–79), where he produced a number of pop, rock, and jazz LPs of Czech singers and bands. He pioneered the use of synthesizers in Czechoslovakia and his music was released by Panton Records and Supraphon, used on TV and in films. From 1977, he recorded his own compositions on synthesizers, initially under the name Odysseus and later under his own name; since 2025, he has also used the name Romantic Robot for releases that make substantial use of AI.

He emigrated to London in 1981. Red Bus Music Library released his solo albums Themes for a One-Man-Band Vol. 1 in 1983 and Themes for a One-Man-Band Vol. 2 in 1984. In 1983 he worked at the BBC Radiophonic Workshop producing his own music for radio, TV, and films. Goldscheider then co-founded a music and computer company Romantic Robot, which initially designed and sold hardware (Multiprint, Videoface, Multifaces 1, 2, 3, 128 and ST) and published software (Music Typewriter, Trans-Express, Genie, Wriggler) for ZX Spectrum, Amstrad CPC, and Atari ST computers.

Romantic Robot became a recording label in 1991, when Goldscheider produced and released a 2-CD set of music written and performed in a Czech concentration camp, released as Terezín: The Music 1941-44. The set included children's opera Brundibár by Hans Krása, which has since been staged, recorded, and filmed all over the world. In addition to producing the CD An American in Prague, Goldscheider has since concentrated on writing, performing, and producing his own compositions, recording classical singers, large choruses, and the Romantic Robot Orchestra on CDs such as Stabat Mater and The Song of Songs, with occasional detours into web design. In June 2018, British record company Little Beat Different released his eponymous vinyl LP Alexander Goldscheider. The first part of his memoirs, Cílené náhody (Intended Coincidences), was published in Prague in July 2020. Online flipbook editions include Písně pro jiné i pro mne (2025) and French Poetry in Chansons (2026). More than 400 of his music videos are available on YouTube, including the albums Les Poètes maudits, Sergej Jesenin and Marceline Desbordes-Valmore: 14 Poèmes en chansons. In August 2025, Czech Radio's Vltava station broadcast five hours of his memoirs in the series Osudy Alexandera Goldscheidera.

His grandson Ben Goldscheider is a horn soloist and a professor at the Royal Conservatoire Antwerp. He won the Brass Category Final of the 2016 BBC Young Musician competition.

== Discography and Books ==
- Themes for a One-Man-Band Vol. 1 (1983, Red Bus Music Library, RBML 103)
- Themes for a One-Man-Band Vol. 2 (1984, Red Bus Music Library, RBML 108)
- Themes for a One-Man Band (Red Bus Music Library, RBML CD 008, 33-track CD featuring material from both volumes)
- Undercurrents (various artists, 15 tracks by Goldscheider)
- Terezín: The Music 1941–44 (produced)
- An American in Prague (produced)
- Stabat Mater
- The Song of Songs
- Alexander Goldscheider (2018)
- Les Poètes maudits
- Sergej Jesenin
- Marceline Desbordes-Valmore: 14 Poèmes en chansons
- Cílené náhody (Intended Coincidences)
