= Wiggle =

Wiggle or wiggles may refer to:

== Music ==
=== Groups ===
- Wiggle, a UK DJ duo formed by Nathan Coles and Terry Francis
- The Wiggles, an Australian children's music group

=== Albums and EPs ===
- The Wiggles (album), 1991, by The Wiggles
- Wiggle (album), 1993, by Screeching Weasel
- The Wiggle, a 2004 techno EP by Dave Clarke

=== Songs ===
- "Wiggle" (song), 2014, by Jason Derulo
- "Wiggle", by Rick Ross from his 2021 album Richer Than I Ever Been
- "The Wiggle", 1960, by Sandy Nelson
- "That Wiggle", 1977, by Syl Johnson
- "The Wiggle", by Father MC from Sex Is Law 1993
- "The Wiggle", by Earl Klugh from Sudden Burst of Energy 1996
- "The Wiggle", by Mother Superior from The Heavy Soul Experience 1996

== Other uses ==
- Wiggle (book), a children's book by Doreen Cronin and Scott Menchin
- The Wiggle, a bike route in San Francisco
- Wiggle Ltd, an online sporting goods retailer
- WGL (API), a Microsoft Windows graphics programming interface, pronounced "wiggle"

== See also ==
- Wiggle It (disambiguation)
- Wiggle Wiggle (disambiguation)
- Wiggler (disambiguation)
- Wigle (disambiguation)
