= Romantic Robot =

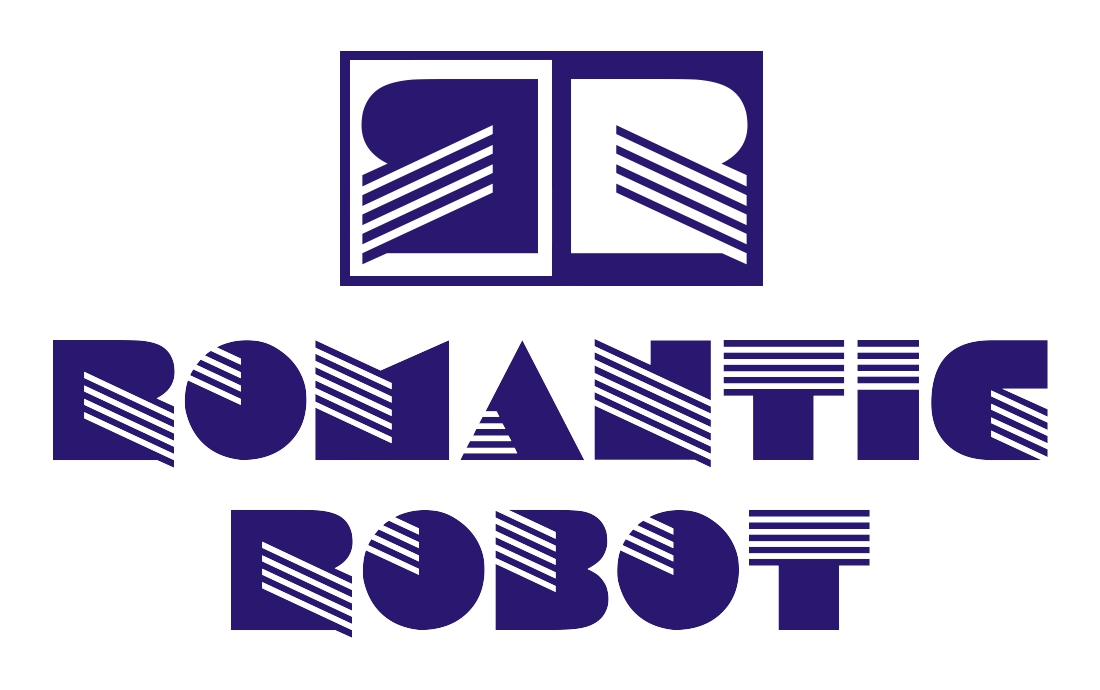
- Founded: London, UK (1983; 43 years ago)
- Headquarters: London, UK
- Key people: Alexander Goldscheider, Ondřej Kořínek
- Website: Romantic Robot

Romantic Robot is a small independent British company that publishes classical music recordings. In the 1980s it designed and produced peripherals and software for home computers.

== History ==
Romantic Robot was founded in London in 1983 by Czech-born Alexander Goldscheider and Ondřej Kořínek. The company sold hardware and software for the ZX Spectrum, Amstrad CPC, and later Atari ST home computers. After Kořínek left the company in 1990, Romantic Robot specialised in music production and publishing.

== Home computer peripherals ==
The company's primary hardware product was the Multiface series of interface devices which allowed dumping and retrieval of the computer's RAM contents to external storage devices such as disk drives, as well as utilities for viewing and disassembling that data. The first in the series was the Multiface One for the ZX Spectrum. It was followed by the Multiface Two for the Amstrad CPC, the Multiface 128 for the Spectrum 128, the Multiface 3 for the Spectrum +3 and the Multiface ST for the Atari ST. Other peripherals developed and sold by Romantic Robot were the Multiprint printer interface and the Videoface video capture peripheral, both for the ZX Spectrum.

== Home computer software ==
Software published by the company included utility programs and games:

- Trans-Express (ZX Spectrum) - a suite of utilities for copying data between media such as cassette tape, ZX Microdrive, Rotronics Wafadrive and Opus Discovery floppy disk
- Music Typewriter (ZX Spectrum) - a program for writing, editing and printing music notation
- Genie (ZX Spectrum) - disassembler for use with the Multiface 1
- Lifeguard (ZX Spectrum) - infinite lives finder program for use with the Multiface 1
- Insider (Amstrad CPC) - disassembler for the Multiface 2
- Rodos (Amstrad CPC) - alternative Disk Operating System
- Wriggler (ZX Spectrum, Amstrad CPC) - game
- Steeplejack (ZX Spectrum) - game

== Music ==
The company released a double CD Terezín: The Music 1941-44, followed by Aaron Copland: An American in Prague and Alexander Goldscheider's own productions such as Stabat Mater and The Song of Songs. It also designed the website of Czech conductor Jiří Bělohlávek.

== Gallery ==
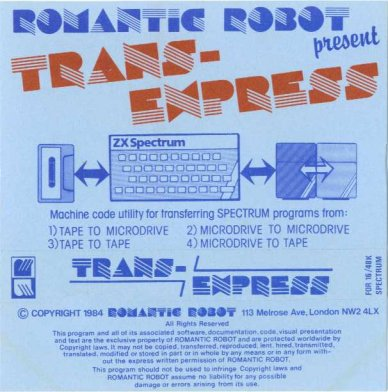
Trans-Express

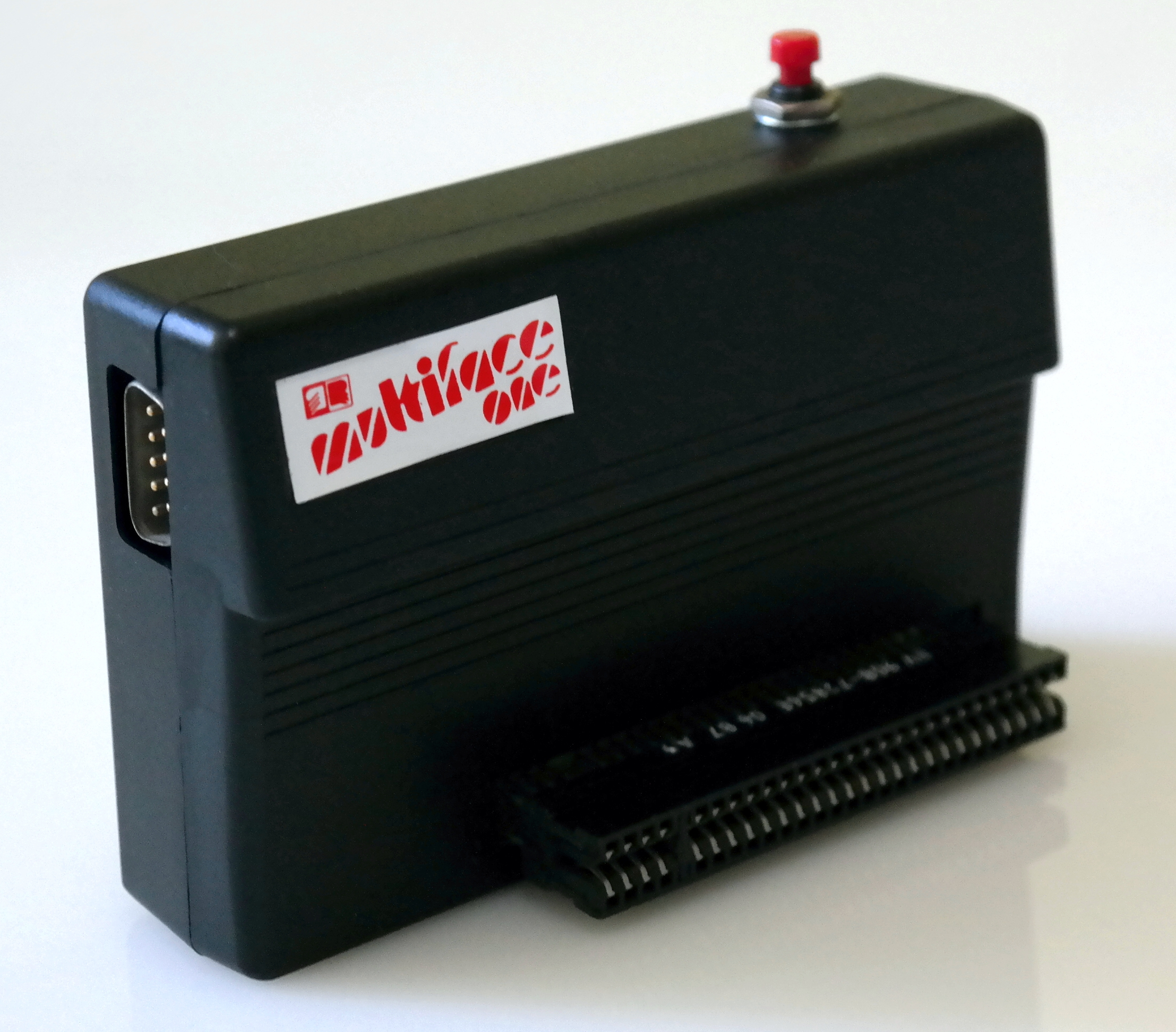
Multiface One

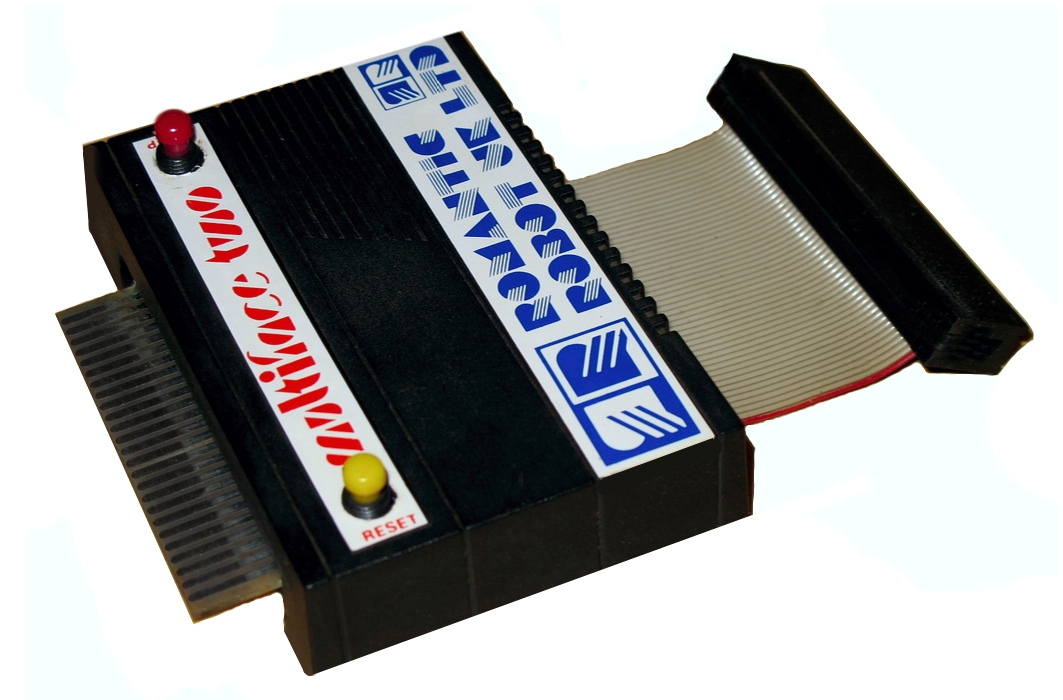
Multiface Two

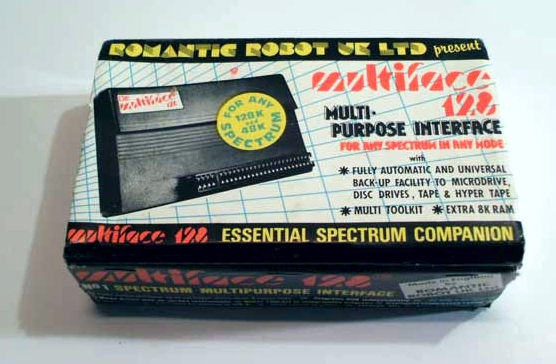
Multiface 128

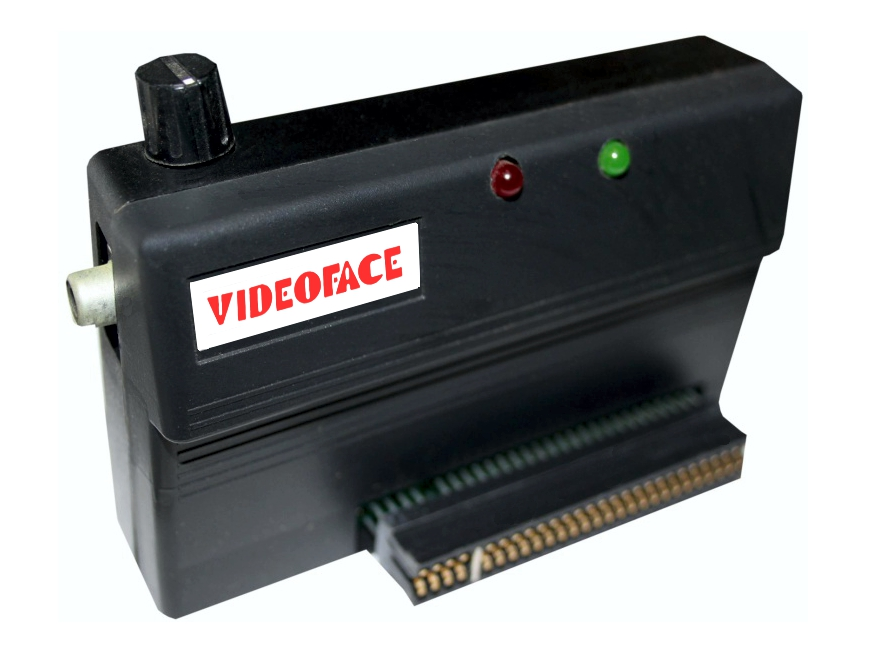
Videoface

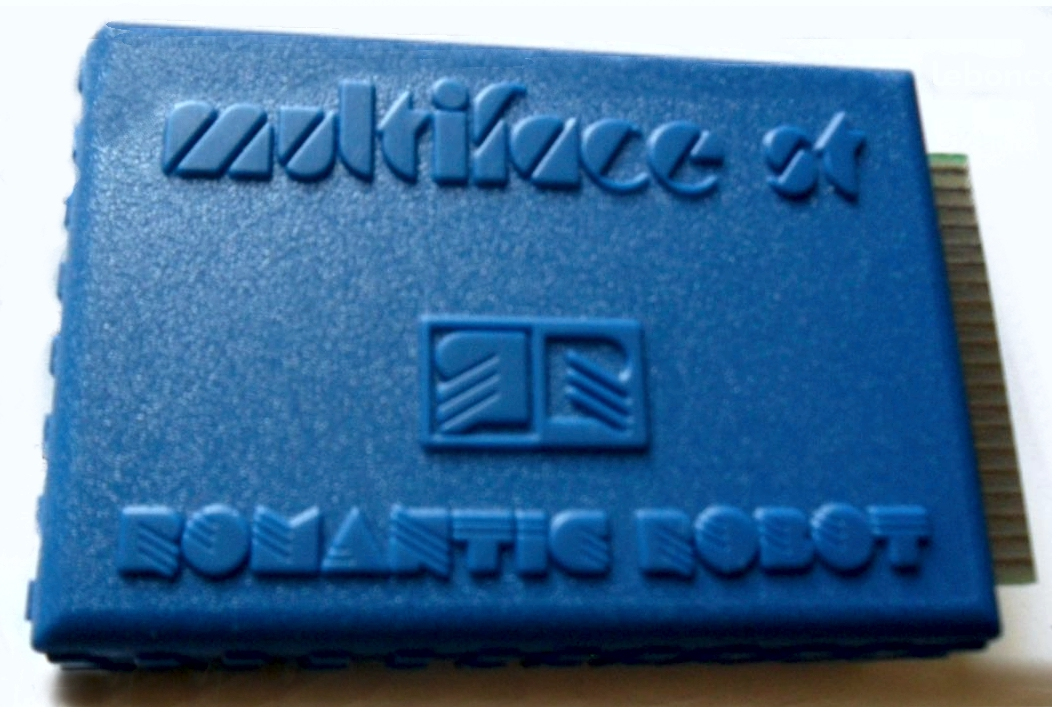
Multiface ST

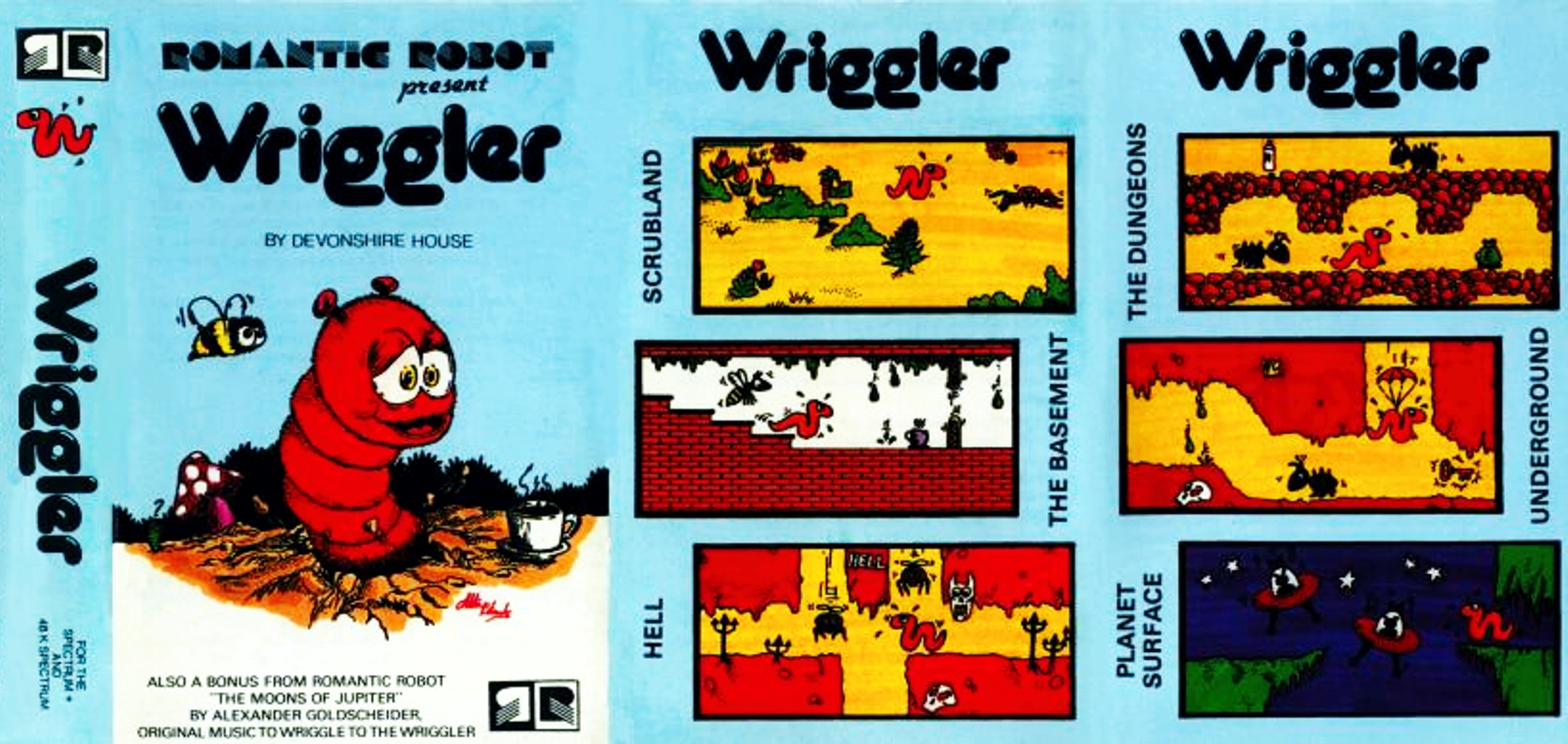
Wriggler

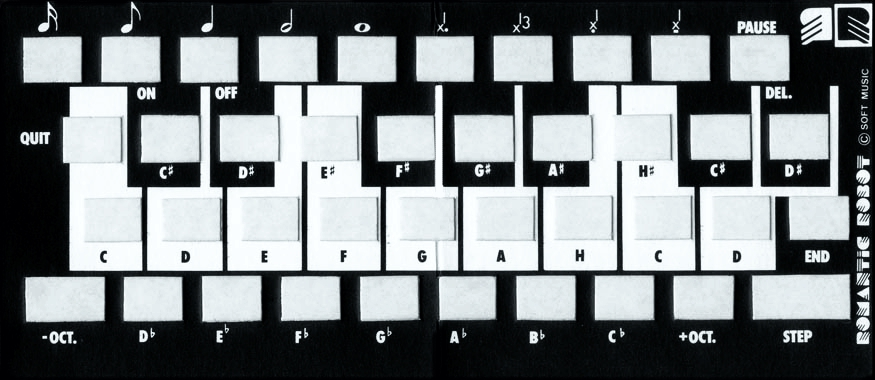
Music Typewriter keyboard overlay

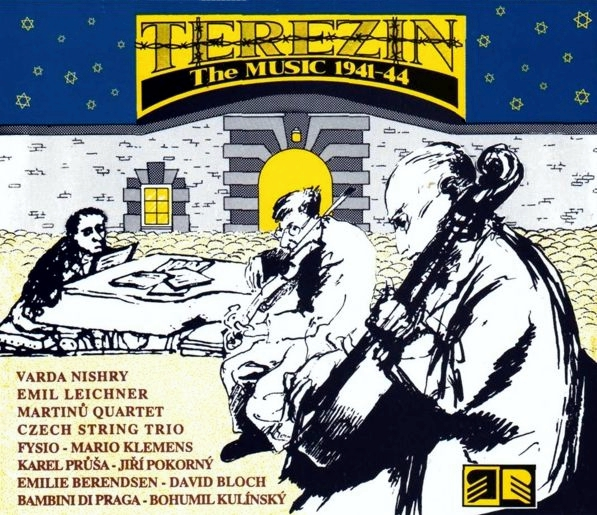
Terezín: The Music 1941–44

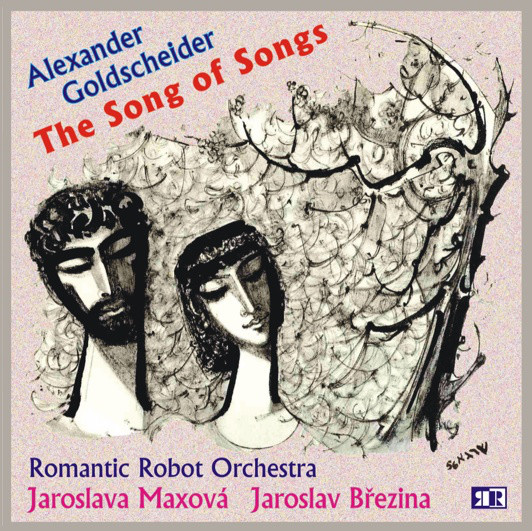
The Song of Songs

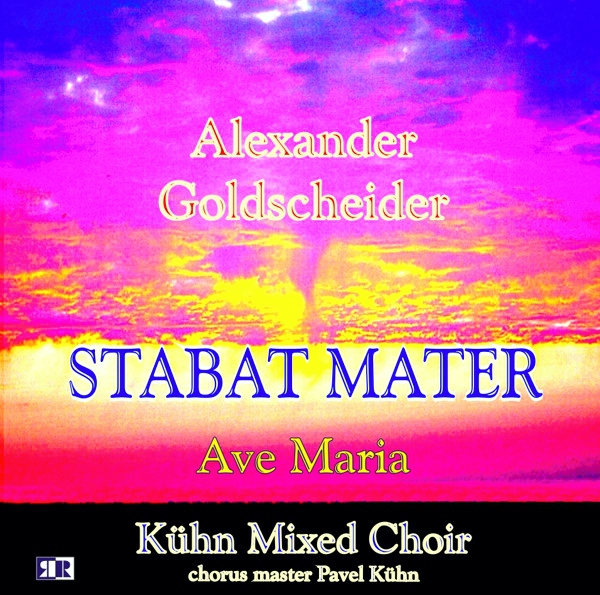
Stabat Mater
