= Sonoton =

Music company

Sonoton Music is a German Production Music Library. Founded in 1965 by Rotheide and Gerhard Narholz in Munich (Germany), the company owns the copyrights of over 60,000 compositions and 150,000 recordings of all genres. With more than 30 sub-publishing partners worldwide, Sonoton Music licences the use of its music for TV, motion picture, advertising and internet productions.

== History ==
1965: Rotheide and Gerhard Narholz establish Sonoton Music as a company in Munich, Germany. Gerhard Narholz, songwriter for artists such as Petula Clark, Bill Ramsey and Heidi Brühl, and composer for German feature films and television series, provides specific film and television music as background music, thus introducing library music in Germany.

1965 – 1970: Sonoton continues to develop the library business in Germany. The initial TV-specific music catalogue is expanded into a variety of genres through works of other composers.

1969: Sonoton entered the international market through the British BERRY MUSIC company, who sub-publishes Sonoton productions worldwide on the library music labels CONROY, STUDIO ONE and PROGRAMME PRODUCTIONS.

Sonoton enters the commercial record market, producing Easy Listening Music for Japan, which is released on Polydor Records and King Records, Tokyo.

1970 – 1980: Using the alias Norman Candler, Gerhard Narholz composes, arranges and conducts over 20 LPs with his large string orchestra, the MAGIC STRINGS, internationally released on the labels Decca Records/ Telefunken and King Records.

In 1971, Norman Candler received the “3 Star Award” from BBC London for “Best Album of the Year”.

Sonoton expands its Easy Listening catalogue with recording artists Nelson Riddle, Billy May, Ted Heath, Acker Bilk, Xavier Cugat, Horst Jankowski and Franck Pourcel.

1973: EMI buys BERRY MUSIC, the former Sonoton agent in the UK. This marks the birth of Sonoton Music's own record label. The unicolored album covers for library music LPs are replaced with individually designed, full-color sleeves.

1975: Sonoton Music introduces the British KPM label to the German market. More international labels follow.

1981: Sonoton Music establishes its world music label SAS (Sonoton Authentic Series).

1982: Sonoton Music releases Claude Larson and John Fiddy's Plantlife, an influential library music album which has seen modern reappraisal and celebration in certain internet circles.

1984: Sonoton Music is the first library to release its music on CD.

1987^{:} Sonoton Music establishes the CNS label (COMMERCIALS NON STOP), featuring specific commercial and promo tracks.

1991: Sonoton Music represents SONIA Classics, a collection of classical works on CD, for synchronization.

1992: Sonoton Music is the first music library to present its own music search programme, SONOfind, on floppy disk.

1993: Sonoton is represented by ASSOCIATED PRODUCTION MUSIC (APM) in the USA.

1995: Sonoton Music begins operating its own music recording studio in Munich, Germany.

1997: Sonoton Music creates its own sound effects series, SONOspheres, which focuses on atmospheric sounds and effects.

1998: Sonoton Music introduces an online music search programme and makes its entire repertoire accessible via the Internet.

2001: Sonoton Music opens a new digital 5.1 music recording studio in Munich and presents library DVDs with 5.1 mixes of large orchestral recordings.

2006: Sonoton Music offers its entire repertoire on hard drive including an offline search system.

2010: Sonoton Music is the first European production music library to release its SONOfind music search program as an app for iOS and Android based mobile devices.

== Business model ==
Based on contracts with composers and recording artists, Sonoton Music owns the Synchronization and Performing Rights of its compositions and recordings, and licenses these rights to the audio-visual industry on a track-by-track or project-by-project basis. In countries where a Mechanical Copyright Society is in function (such as MCPS (Mechanical-Copyright Protection Society) in UK or GEMA in Germany), Synchronization Rights (the right to combine music with audio-visuals or/and advertising) are licensed through these societies. In all other countries (such as US) synchronization licenses have to be obtained from the local Sonoton Music representative.

Performing Rights (the right to perform music publicly, live or in any media, such as TV, film, etc...) are granted through local performing right societies, which usually have blanket agreements with broadcasters. Composers get their shares of licenses either through membership of a Mechanical and/or Performing Rights Societies and/or through Sonoton, depending on the local legal conditions.

== Notable Composers for Sonoton ==
- Geoff Bastow
- Dick DeBenedictis
- John Fox
- Dave Gage
- Horst Jankowski
- Gordon Mulrain
- Lelo Nazario
- Klaus Netzle
- Dieter Reith
- Mladen Franko
- Gregor F. Narholz
- Adam Saunders and Mark Cousins
- Kapono Beamer
- Greg Foat
- Sonic Boom
- Black Twig Pickers
- Brothers Nylon
- Thomas Hewitt Jones
- Rachel K. Collier
- Carmen Lundy
- Laszlo Bencker
- Michael Hornstein
- Sven Torstenson

== Credits ==
Sonoton Music has been featured in productions such as (selection):

- Motion Picture: Harry Potter and the Prisoner of Azkaban, The SpongeBob SquarePants Movie, Fahrenheit 9/11, Kiss Kiss Bang Bang, Spider-Man 2, Frida, The Mummy, Platoon, Wonder Boys, City Slickers, Born on the Fourth of July, Natural Born Killers
- Television: The Sopranos, Medium, JAG, Sex and the City, The West Wing, Friends, The Drew Carey Show, The Daily Show, The Oprah Winfrey Show, SpongeBob SquarePants, The Young and the Restless, Days of Our Lives, Fifteen to One (Polish version), NFL Films, The Loud House (2016-2019)
- Video Games: X-Men Legends 2, Battlefield 2142, American Chopper: Full Throttle, Shrek 3, The Sims Games Series, Outlaw Golf 2, Gretsky 6, SOCOM 3: US Navy Seals, Saints Row, The Punisher, The Sopranos, WWE Smackdown! vs. Raw, Surf's Up, Fallout New Vegas, Ratchet & Clank Future: A Crack in Time
- Advertising: Mercedes-Benz, AT&T, Jack in the Box, Las Vegas Tourism Board

== Further reading / Articles ==
- Official Sonoton website
- Wikipedia: Gerhard Narholz
- SONOfind music search
- Auer, Rudolf (January 2008). "Reise in die Musikwelt". Av-Live. Germany: 20–22.
- Blach, Peter (January 2008). "Sonoton launcht neues Portal für Geräusche". Stagereport. Archived from the original on April 19, 2008.
- Schwimm, Florian (December 2007). "Atmo Online". CUT. Germany: 12–13.
- Redaktion (April 2007). "Neuer Director Marketing & New Media Peter Langs". OpenPR.
- Langs, Peter (December 2007). "Der Markt für Sound-Effekte wächst ständig". Presseanzeiger.
- Heppen, Miriam (May 2007). "Neuer Director Marketing & New Media". Horizont: 23.
- Redaktion (July 2006). "Sonoton HD MusicStation". Professional Production: 37.
- Mader, Herman (January 2004). "SONOspheresFX, ein Ton-Archiv im Dolby-Pro-Logic-Surround-Sound" (PDF). Pro Vision: 26–27.
- Redaktion (September 2001). "Archivmusik im Web". Professional Production: 77–78.
- Redaktion (September 1996). "Effektive Titelsuche in der Music Library". Medien Bulletin: 96.
- Breutmann, Martin (January 1995). "Per Mausklick durch ein Weltrepertoire". Dia Magazin: 45.
- Leibl-Engeler, Gabriela (June 1994). "Der Ton macht die Musik - Archivmusiken als Alternative". Radio Times: 30–31.
- Winhart, Rita (September 1994). "Erste Musik CD-ROM von Sonoton". Pablo: 68.
- Thomsen, Dieter (September 1994). "Von Authentics bis Zeitlupe - Archivmusik nicht nur für Multimedia". Medien Bulletin: 89.
- Bangert, Heike (July 1993). "STEMRA Music Award für Sonoton". Professional Production: 69–70.
- Spiehs, Gerhard (December 1993). "Arbeiten mit Archivmusik". Digi Media: 75–76.
- Auer, Rudolf (June 1991). "Film ohne Musik ist wie Suppe ohne Salz". AV-Invest: 30–33.
