= The Genius of Jankowski! =

1965 album by Horst Jankowski

Studio album by Horst Jankowski
- Released: 1965
- Genre: Instrumental pop; Easy Listening pop jazz
- Length: 28:34
- Label: Mercury

Horst Jankowski chronology
Encore (1965)	The Genius of Jankowski! (1965)	More Genius of Jankowski (1965)

The Genius of Jankowski! is a studio album released by Horst Jankowski in 1965 on Mercury LP record SR 60993 (stereo) and MG 20993 (mono). The album was also issued, in truncated format, on a 7-inch "Little LP" mini-album for Seeburg jukeboxes.

== Reception ==
Prior to appearing on its album charts, Billboard listed the album as a "Breakout" in May 1965. The album was a commercial success, having been listed as high as #18 on the Billboard 200.

== Track listing ==
No.	Title	Length
1.	"My Yiddishe Momme" (Pollack - Yellen)	3:05
2.	"Clair de Lune" (DeBussy (sic))	3:10
3.	"Eine Schwarzwaldfahrt (A Walk in the Black Forest)" (Jankowski)	2:50
4.	"When the Girls Go Marching In" (Jankowski - Rabe)	2:30
5.	"Donkey Serenade" (Friml)	3:19
6.	"Toselli Serenade" (Toselli)	2:50
7.	"Simpel-Gimpel" (Jankowski)	2:50
8.	"Caroline – Denise" (Jankowski)	2:30
9.	"Bald Klopft Das Gluck Auch Mal An Deine Tur (Soon Luck Will Also Knock on Your Door)" (Forell)	2:30
10.	"Nola" (Arndt)	3:00
Total length:		28:34
