= Dieter Reith =

German organist and pianist (1938–2020)

- Born: 25 February 1938; Mainz, Germany
- Died: 1 April 2020 (aged 82); Stuttgart, Germany
- Occupations: Pianist; Organist

Dieter Reith (25 February 1938 – 1 April 2020) was a German organist and pianist.

== Biography ==
Reith began taking piano lessons in 1945. In 1956, he played with the jazz club "Katakombe" in Mainz. After he earned his Abitur in 1958, he studied music and experimental physics. From 1970 to 1973, Reith was an organist for Peter Herbolzheimer's group. He arranged the music for the 1972 Summer Olympics in Munich. The following year, he moved to Stuttgart and directed the Süddeutscher Rundfunk orchestra. He directed the orchestra representing Germany in the 1983 Eurovision Song Contest. He also worked for the German production music label Sonoton.

In 1997, Reith became a member of the GEMA executive committee. In 2016, his song "Flying Dragon" was used as background music in the YouTube video Every NFL Score Ever | Chart Party made by Jon Bois.

Notable musicians who played with Reith include Stan Getz, Jean-Luc Ponty, Art Farmer, Frank Rosolino, Niels-Henning Ørsted Pedersen, Kenny Clarke, Philip Catherine, Benny Bailey, Slide Hampton, Maynard Ferguson, Toots Thielemans, and Herb Geller.
