= Wigle =

Wigle may refer to:

== People ==
- Ebon Rinaldo Wigle, Ontario politician
- Solomon Wigle (1822–1898), Ontario businessman and politician
- Lewis Wigle (1845–1934), Ontario farmer, businessman and politician; son of Solomon Wigle
- Lambert Peter Wigle (1867–1941), Ontario farmer and politician
- Ernest S. Wigle (1859–1947), Ontario lawyer and politician
- Thomas W. Wigle (1909–1944), American World War II veteran and Medal of Honor recipient
- Wigle Aytta van Zwichem (1507–1577), Dutch statesman and jurist

== Other ==
- WiGLE, Wireless Geographic Logging Engine, a website for user aggregation of data about wireless networks worldwide
- Wigle Whiskey, a distillery in Pittsburgh, Pennsylvania

== See also ==
- Wiggle (disambiguation)
