= Belle Baker =

American singer and actress (1893–1957)

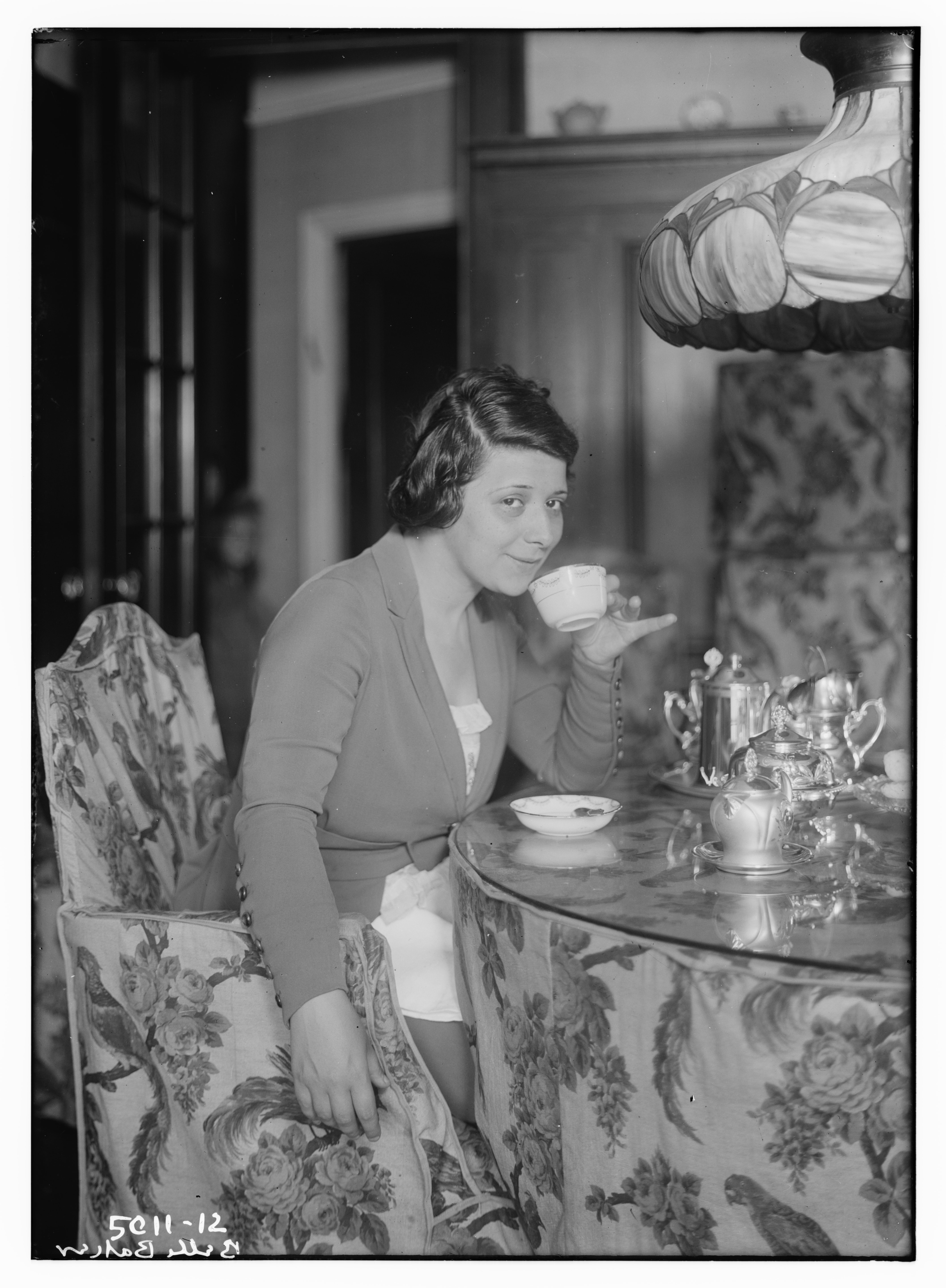
- Baker in 1919

Background information
- Born: Bella Becker; December 25, 1893; New York City, U.S.
- Died: April 29, 1957 (aged 63) Los Angeles, California, U.S.
- Genres: Jazz, Vaudeville
- Occupations: Singer; actress
- Instrument: Vocals
- Years active: 1904–1955
- Spouse: Lew Leslie (m. 1913; div. 1918) Maurice Abrahams (m. 1919; died 1931) Elias Sugarman (m. 1937; died 1941)

Belle Baker (born Bella Becker; December 25, 1893 (Note: Although Baker shaved off as many as five years from her age (her gravestone cites 1898), she was born in 1893, as confirmed by the 1915 New York census, which required the censee's age as of June 1, 1915, and lists Belle Leslie, living with her husband Louis and his family, as 21 years of age. She would turn 22 in December 1915.) – April 29, 1957) was a Jewish American singer, actress, and Vaudeville performer. Popular throughout the 1910s and 1920s, Baker introduced a number of ragtime and torch songs including Irving Berlin's "Blue Skies" and "My Yiddishe Momme". She performed in the Ziegfeld Follies and introduced a number of Irving Berlin's songs. An early adapter to radio, Baker hosted her own radio show during the 1930s. Eddie Cantor called her “Dinah Shore, Patti Page, Peggy Lee, Judy Garland all rolled into one.”

== Early life ==
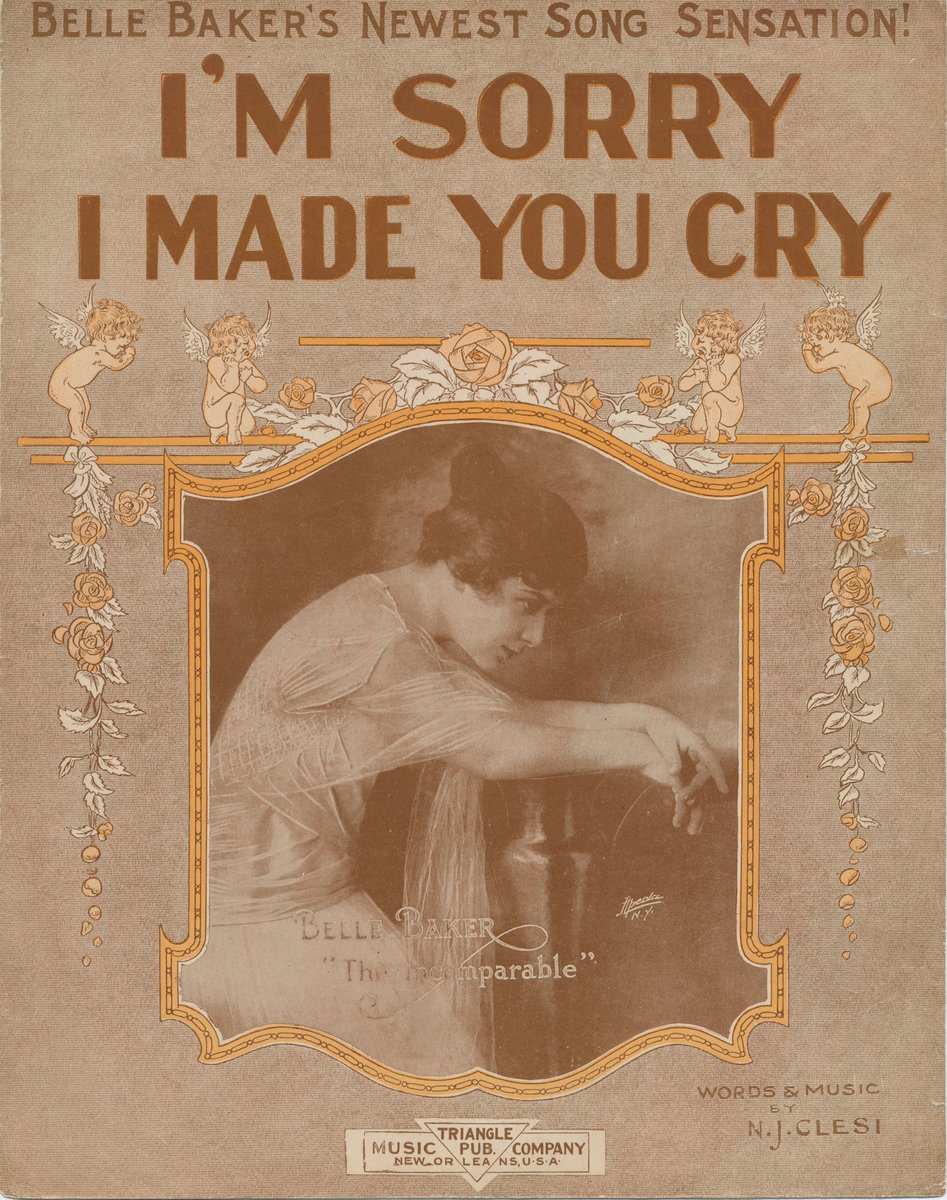
Belle Baker on the sheet music cover of Nick Clesi's 1916 hit "I'm Sorry I Made You Cry"

Baker was born Bella Becker in 1893 to a Russian Jewish family originally from Akmenė (present-day Lithuania) on New York's Lower East Side. She was the third child of eight children born to Hyman (Chaim) Becker and Sarah Rabinowitz. Her mother was chronically ill. Born into extreme poverty, Baker was unable to attend school and was forced to work in a factory when she was 6 years old.

Baker started performing at the Lower East Side's Cannon Street Music Hall at age 11, where she was discovered by the Yiddish Theatre manager Jacob Adler. She was managed in vaudeville by Lew Leslie, who would become Baker's first husband. She made her vaudeville debut in Scranton, Pennsylvania, at the age of 15. She performed in Oscar Hammerstein I's Victoria Theatre in 1911, although her performance was panned, mainly for her song choices. By age 17, she was a headliner. One of her earliest hits was "Cohen Owes Me $97".

== Broadway and film ==
Baker first introduced the song "Eli, Eli" to the American public. The song was originally written by a Jewish songwriter only known by the name Schindler for Baker's role as a child in a play. In the play, the mother is crucified and Baker sings the first line in English ("G-d, oh G-d, why has thou forsaken me?"). Gentiles at the time believed that this was a sung version of a Jewish prayer. However, Baker later clarified this, and it became one of the most popular tunes of the time. The song was later covered by John McCormack, John Steel and Dorothy Jardon.

In 1926, Baker took on the lead role in a play called Betsy. In this production, Baker played the oldest daughter of a Jewish family named the Kitzels. The mother (portrayed by Pauline Hoffman) wouldn't let any of her children get married until Betsy (played by Baker) got married. Legend has it that the production desperately needed a Baker song, and she called Irving Berlin for help. Baker introduced his hit song Blue Skies in Betsy. The song was such a hit that she played it for twenty-four encores on opening night. Blue Skies would later become immortalized by Al Jolson's performance of it in the first ever talkie movie, The Jazz Singer.

Later that year, Baker introduced the song My Yiddishe Momme to the American public. The song was made even more famous by Sophie Tucker and popularized by The Barry Sisters. It was extremely important from a Jewish American standpoint during this time, as it represented internal conflict over assimilation into gentile society. The song was viewed very positively by gentiles and eventually became so popular around the world that it was banned in Nazi Germany; leading Jewish prisoners of concentration camps to sing it.

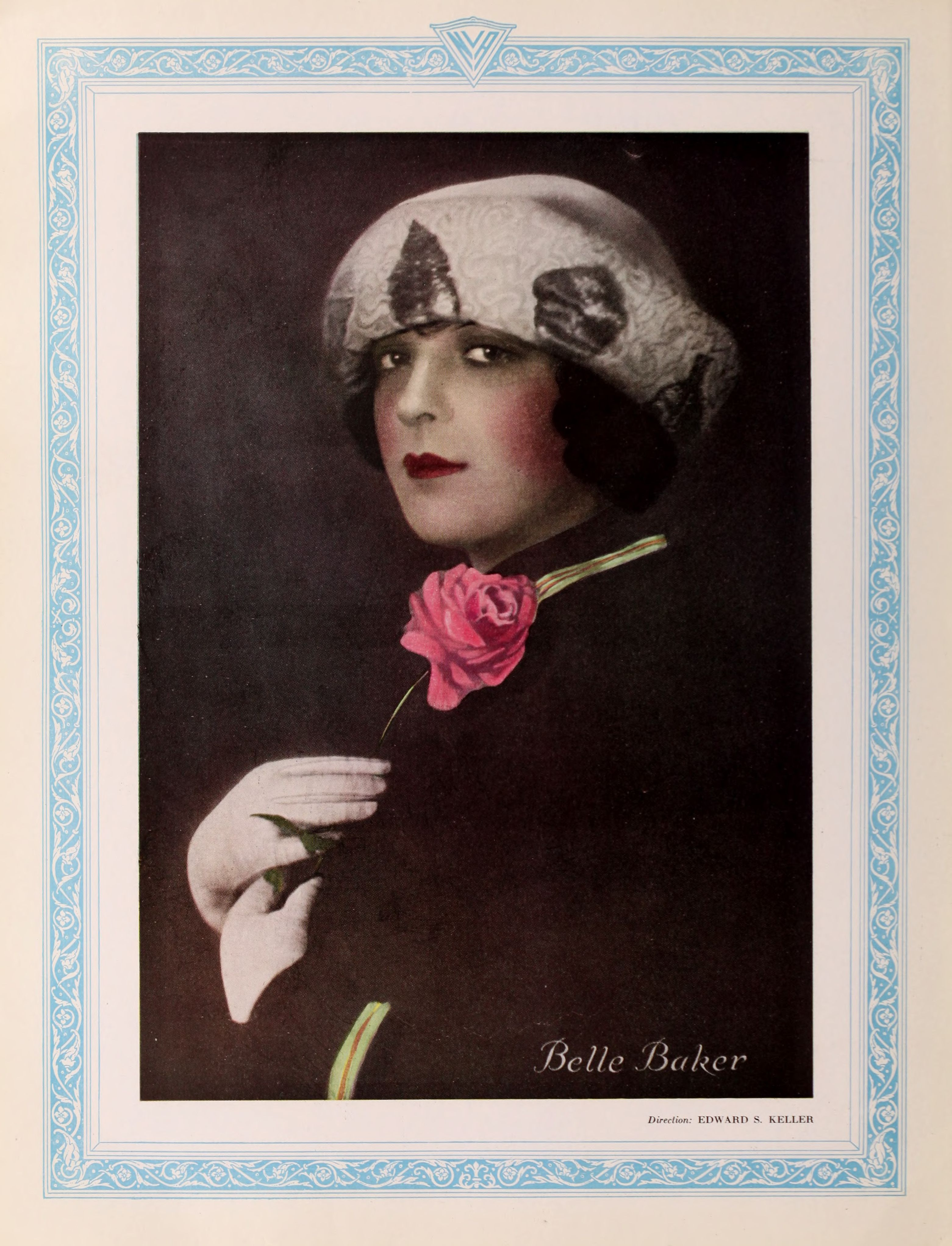
Belle Baker, circa. 1923

Baker had a brief film career as silent film gave way to lavish technicolor musical talkies. She made her film debut starring in the 1929 talkie Song of Love. The film survives and has been screened at film festivals but not released on DVD. Song of Love features two songs performed by Baker written by her husband, "I'm Walking with the Moonbeams (Talking to the Stars)" and "Take Everything But You". She made two more film appearances, in Charing Cross Road (1935) and Atlantic City (1944; in which she performed "Nobody's Sweetheart").

== Radio ==
Baker was a very early adapter to radio and hosted her own radio show in the early 1930s. In 1932, Baker became a regular on Jack Denny's radio program on CBS. She was a guest performer on The Eveready Hour, broadcasting's first major variety show, which featured Broadway's top headliners. Baker continued performing through the 1930s, but limited her performances to radio shows.

== Views and Charity ==
Baker was a Zionist, stating in 1924,

"I am a firm believer in Zionism. I believe that the Jewish people should have a home of their own. It is the one prayer our fathers have been saying through the centuries."

In 1935, Baker hosted a show in England to raise money for Jews fleeing Nazi persecution through the United Jewish Appeal. Several years before her death, she performed several songs at the opening of a Congregation Sons of Israel on Irving Place alongside the president of the American Jewish Committee, Rabbi Irving Miller.

== Personal life ==
Baker's first marriage was in 1913, to producer and promoter Lew Leslie. The couple divorced in 1918. In 1919, she married Maurice Abrahams, a successful Russian-American songwriter/composer, who wrote such songs as "Ragtime Cowboy Joe", "He'd Have to Get Under — Get Out and Get Under (to Fix Up His Automobile)", "I'm Walking with the Moonbeams (Talking to the Stars)", and "Take Everything But You". The couple had one child, Herbert Joseph Abrahams, (later known as Herbert Baker), who became a screenwriter. After Abrahams' death in 1931, Baker restricted her performing to radio. On September 21, 1937, she remarried, to Elias Sugarman, editor of the theatrical trade magazine, Billboard. The couple divorced in 1941. She made one final television appearance in This Is Your Life in 1955, just two years before her death.

Many of Baker's family later became involved with showbusiness. Her brother, Irving Becker, married stage actress Vinnie Phillips and became a road manager for a production of Tobacco Road. The Broadway actress Marilyn Cooper was her niece.

== Legacy ==
Baker was famous throughout her lifetime. At the height of her popularity in the 1920s, a poll taken from over 3 million people found her and Sophie Tucker to be tied for the most popular Vaudeville stars. Many of Baker's songs, such as My Yiddishe Mama, Blue Skies and All Of Me, are still popular to this day. She was referred to as "the Female Al Jolson and the Sarah Bernardt of Songland."

== Filmography ==
- Song of Love (1929)
- Charing Cross Road (1935)
- Atlantic City (1944)

== Links ==
- The New York Times: Mordaunt Hall review of Song of Love (November 14, 1929)
