= So What's New? =

So What's New? may refer to:

- So What's New? (Horst Jankowski album), 1966
- So What's New? (Dave Brubeck album), 1998
