= Lelo Nazario =

Lelo Nazario is a Composer, arranger, pianist, producer and musical director whose work is marked by experimentation and timelessness. Recognized in his native Brazil and abroad as the creator of a unique style that blends contemporary classical music and jazz with avant-garde forms and Brazilian motifs, he wrote award-winning music which includes works for piano, orchestra and ensembles of various configurations as well as electroacoustic music, film scores, television, opera, dance and theater.

Born in São Paulo in 1956, he began his piano studies piano at age 4, and later studied with pianist Menininha Lobo. A passion for the avant-garde styles came at an early age, and at age 17, he was invited to the group of Hermeto Pascoal along with his brother, drummer Ze Eduardo Nazario. The brothers and the bassist, Zeca Assumpção, formed what became known as “The S. Paulo Rhythm Section” of the Hermeto group until 1977.

In search of his own musical style, he formed the Grupo UM in 1976, using bold and dense sound experiments to create an original repertoire that combined acoustic music and Brazilian rhythms in a contemporary musical structure. With the Grupo, he released three albums, including Marcha Sobre A Cidade (1979), the first instrumental album issued in Brazil and considered one of the most important records of the history of Brazilian instrumental music. During this same time, he also led the Symmetric Ensemble (two pianos and two basses), trying new sounds in a non-conventional formation.

In 1980, he created the Utopia Studio, where he developed pioneering experiments and music that blurred the boundaries between popular forms, producing his first solo albums: Lagrima / Sursolide suite (1982), Discurso aos Objetos / Balada Unidimensional (1984) and "Se ..." (1989).

Between 1989 and 2000, he joined the Pau Brazil group, with which he recorded four albums, among them Pau Brasil & Hermeto Pascoal (1994) and Babel (1996), which won the Sharp Award for Best Instrumental Group of the Year and also won the 1998 Grammy nomination in the Jazz category. In partnership with the group, he composed the Opera dos 500, by Naum Alves de Souza, staged on the occasion of the 500 years of America in Teatro Municipal de São Paulo.

He created original soundtracks for short and feature films such as Anchieta José do Brazil (Sergio G. Saraceni), in partnership with Marlui Miranda, Hans Staden, and Luiz A. Pereira, which received the award for best soundtrack at the Film Festival of Brasília in 2000. He worked with choreographers such as Takao Kusuno, Claudia de Souza and Germaine Acogny.

Commissioned by the Symphonic Band of São Paulo (BSESP), he composed Limite (1990) and Aurora (1996), for symphonic band, electronic keyboards, prerecorded sounds and percussion. The works were presented by BSESP, with the Duo Nazario (formed with his brother Zé Eduardo), at the Teatro Municipal of Rio de Janeiro (at the Bienal de Musica Contemporânea) in Memorial da América Latina, in São Paulo, and the Conference World Association for Symphonic Bands and Ensembles, Austria.

Along with Zé Eduardo and guitarist Felipe Avila, he formed the Percussonica group in 1998, which recorded two CDs. Following with his solo work, he released the album Simples (1998) and Africasiamerica (2006), described as one of the top 10 instrumental CDs of the year by critic Arnaldo DeSouteiro.

As musical director and arranger, he has performed in concerts and albums, including Garoto, by Paul Bellinati; Mundo, by Rodolfo Stroeter; Paiter Merewá: Suruí de Rondonia, by Marlui Miranda; Authentic South America: The Brazilian Amazon Rainforest Music (Sonoton, Germany) and Trampolim, by Monica Salmaso and Universos Sonoros para Violão e Tape, by Daniel Murray. As a pianist and keyboardist, he participated in numerous works by other composers, performers and groups.

Traveling with assurance and sensitivity between new classical and jazz, Lelo Nazario is considered a virtuoso on the keyboards and a composer with a deep understanding of contemporary music, jazz and traditional Brazilian rhythms.

In a career of over 30 years, he toured Europe and the United States and worked with great names of classical and jazz music including Almeida Prado, Hermeto Pascoal, conductors Roberto Farias and Gil Jardim, Edu Lobo, Gilberto Gil, Naná Vasconcelos, John Scofield, Toninho Horta, Mauro Senise, Márcio Montarroyos, Hector Costita, Benjamin Taubkin, Roberto Sion, Zeca Assumpção, Toninho Carrasqueira, Jon H. Appleton, among many others.
