= Wiggle Wiggle =

Wiggle Wiggle can refer to:

- "Wiggle Wiggle" (Hello Venus song), 2015
- "Wiggle Wiggle" (Ronnie Sessions song), 1977
- "Wiggle Wiggle" (Bob Dylan song), 1990
- "Don't Stop (Wiggle Wiggle)", by the Outhere Brothers, 1994
- Wiggle Wiggle and Other Exercises, an album of children's songs by Bobby Susser

== See also ==
- Wiggle (disambiguation)
