= Wriggler =

Wriggler may refer to:

- Collared wrigglers, fish in the family Xenisthmidae
- Wriggler (mosquito larva), larvae of mosquitoes
- Wriggler (video game), a computer game for the ZX Spectrum

== See also ==
- Wiggler (disambiguation)
