= Dave Gage =

American musician (born 1957)

- Born: 1957 (age 68–69)
- Origin: California, United States
- Genres: Rock, blues, heavy metal
- Occupations: Musician, harmonica instructor, author
- Instrument: Harmonica
- Years active: 1980–present
- Label: AYM Records
- Website: harmonicalessons.com

Dave Gage (born 1957) is an American harmonica player and instructor, recording artist, author, and webmaster, known for harmonica web sites and more than 25 years of session work in recording studios throughout Southern California.

Gage plays both diatonic and chromatic "harps," as the harmonica is informally known. He is a veteran of several bands, most recently the eponymous "Gage," and an acknowledged master of the "tongue switching" technique that modifies standard harmonica tongue blocking to create a rock-guitar effect similar to the tapping made famous by guitarist Eddie Van Halen Eddie Van Halen. As the reviewers from Planet Harmonica stated, "Dave Gage puts forward a modern Rock/Heavy Metal approach rather than a bluesy one, although his style doesn't depart as radically from blues as say, John Popper's."

== Biography ==
Looking for a way to round out content on a website devoted to an early iteration of his band, Gage began posting harmonica tips to the web in 1997. Those tips proved popular with visitors, and Gage soon realized the utility of consolidating his web-based harmonica instruction into its own site. The result, Harmonicalessons.com, has since become the largest and most-visited web site of its kind in the world.

He is also the father of Alex and Brody Gage, who form the musical duo The Brothers Gage. He has taught harmonica to students of all levels at McCabe's Guitar Shop, in Santa Monica, California since 1980. His television credits include bumper and theme music for shows such as Davis Rules (ABC, 1991-1992) and Adventures in Wonderland (Disney Channel, 1993-1995), as well as numerous TV and radio commercials. His film credits include harmonica playing, along with Tommy Morgan, for Without a Paddle.

Gage plays many different styles of music and studied jazz improvisation with vibraphonist Charlie Shoemake, but he is most closely associated with rock. His live performances around Los Angeles, according to his own website, typically draw rave reviews. He has recorded or played with members of such bands as Devo, Black Sabbath, and The Police. Outside the recording studio and various gigs, he also worked as a product consultant for the Hohner and Lee Oskar harmonica companies.

The Gage discography includes Well You Can't Now, Can You? (1991, rated 9 out of 10 by Music Connection magazine) and Love You Just the Same (2000, on his own AYM label).

== Discography ==
=== Fronting his own band ===
- Well You Can't, Now Can You (AYM Records, 1991)
- Love You Just the Same (AYM Records, 2000)

=== With others ===
- Ward One: Along the Way (Debut solo album from Black Sabbath drummer, Bill Ward: Chameleon Records, 1985)
- Cookin' Cowboys (Sonoton, 1994)
- Scary Sound Effects (Rhino Records, 1995)
- Einstein was a Bullfighter (Doc Tahri, Cash Only Records, 1996)
- American Heartland (Akai sample disc, Sonic Reality, 1998)
- American Folk Revival (Sonoton, 2005)
- Kick (by Pilotfish Productions for California Dept of Conservation, 2007) - Gage provided the music for this Emmy Award-winning public service announcement
