= Song of Love (1929 film) =

1929 film

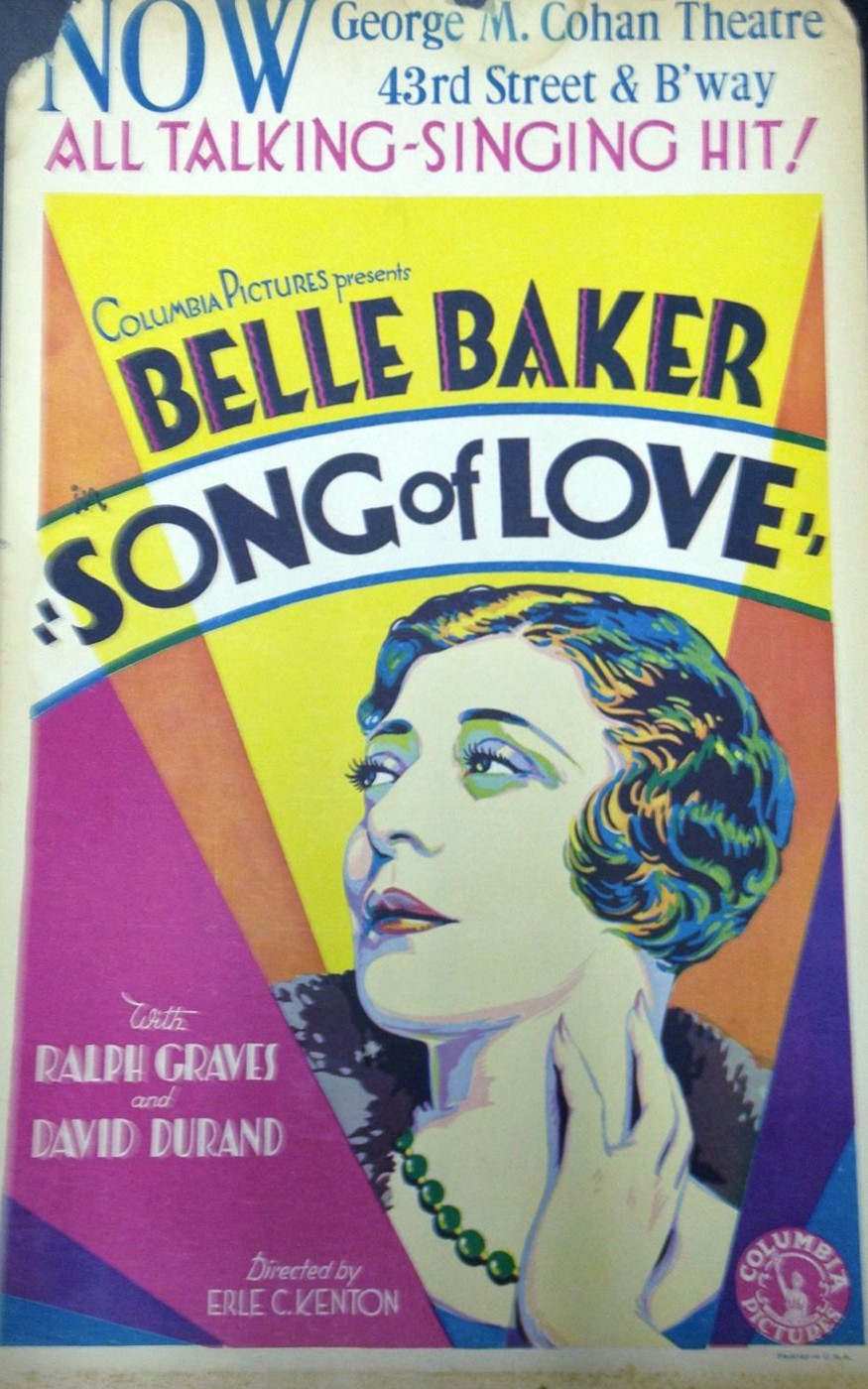
- Window poster
- Directed by: Erle C. Kenton
- Written by: Howard J. Green; Dorothy Howell; Henry McCarty; Norman Houston
- Produced by: Edward Small
- Starring: Belle Baker; Ralph Graves; Eve Arden
- Edited by: Gene Havlick
- Production company: Columbia Pictures
- Release date: November 13, 1929
- Running time: 76 minutes
- Country: United States
- Language: English

Song of Love is a 1929 American pre-Code musical film directed by Erle C. Kenton and starring Belle Baker and Ralph Graves. It was released by Columbia Pictures on November 13, 1929. The film was the film debut of Belle Baker. The film contained songs but was also issued in a silent version. Actress Eve Arden made her film debut in the film, appearing under her real name, Eunice Quedens.

== Plot ==
Anna Gibson, her husband Tom Gibson, and their young son Buddy have formed a small vaudeville act called ‘The Three Gibsons.’ Anna performs songs with warmth and a flair for the dramatic; Tom delights the audience with his humorous dances and witty patter; and Buddy a bright child raised in the world of traveling entertainment joins in the fun with his own playful, comedic performances.Their performance always concludes with Ana’s poignant rendition of the song “Take Everything But You,” during which Buddy joins her from his box by the stage to sing the chorus. At that moment, the entire auditorium erupts in applause a beautiful blend of familial affection and stagecraft.

But Anna begins to worry. Buddy, raised entirely in dressing rooms and theaters, knows nothing of ordinary childhood. The act works, but his life doesn't. The moment of truth arrives when Buddy misses a performance because he has been playing baseball with neighborhood boys. He is so absorbed in the game that he forgets the theater entirely. Anna realizes, with a pang, that her son has been robbed of childhood and normal growth.

Anna resolves to step away from the stage to give Buddy a home, stability, and proper schooling. Tom, a dyed-in-the-wool trouper, resists the plan. He sees Buddy as a born performer whose career should be fostered, not cut short. When blonde vaudevillian Maisie LeRoy, who has designs on Tom, offers to replace Anna in the act, Tom reluctantly agrees.

Anna and Buddy move to a cottage in Freeport, New England. They settle into a quiet life, with Anna teaching Buddy and treasuring his chance to be an ordinary boy. Meanwhile, Tom tours with Maisie, enjoying her attention and the act's success.

When Tom returns for Buddy's birthday party, Anna senses distance. At last Tom admits the truth—he has fallen in love with Maisie. Heartbroken, Anna tells him they must separate. She will support Buddy, but for the boy's sake they will keep up the pretense of family unity in his eyes.

Through her friend Joe Sweeney , an acrobat, Anna secures work singing at the Golden Pheasant Cabaret. Her voice and sincerity captivate the audience. Soon she is a headliner and receives an offer for the “big time.” With her new income, Anna is able to place Buddy in a military school.

When visiting, she conceals the truth from Buddy, speaking warmly of Tom and encouraging his letters to his father. Buddy memorizes Tom's performance route and writes regularly. Proud of Anna's rising fame, Buddy shows a Variety clipping of her Palace Theatre debut to his school friends. But one boy points out the next-page story—a gossip item announcing the rift between Anna and Tom. Shocked, Buddy decides to bring his parents back together.

Buddy runs away and finds Tom in a nearby town. He pleads with his father to leave Maisie and return to Anna. Tom, weary of Maisie's clinging and realizing his mistake, doesn't need much convincing. After a bitter farewell to Maisie, Tom agrees to go with Buddy to New York.

Father and son attend Anna's Palace engagement. They sit in the audience, quietly watching her triumph. Anna pours her soul into her songs. Then, when she begins “Take Everything But You,” Buddy instinctively runs to the stage box and joins in, just as in the old days. The audience roars with delight, and Anna, overwhelmed, sees Tom smiling at her from the crowd.

The film ends with The Three Gibsons reuniting, who reconcile as a family and continue their vaudeville career together.

== Cast ==
- Belle Baker as Anna Gibson
- Ralph Graves as Tom Gibson
- Eve Arden as Maisie LeRoy (credited as Eunice Quedens)
- Arthur Housman as Joe Sweeney, Acrobat
- Charles C. Wilson as Traveling Salesman (credited as Charles Wilson)

== See also ==
- List of early sound feature films (1926–1929)
