= Wiggler (tool) =

Tool used on a machine to accurately align the head with the work prior to machining

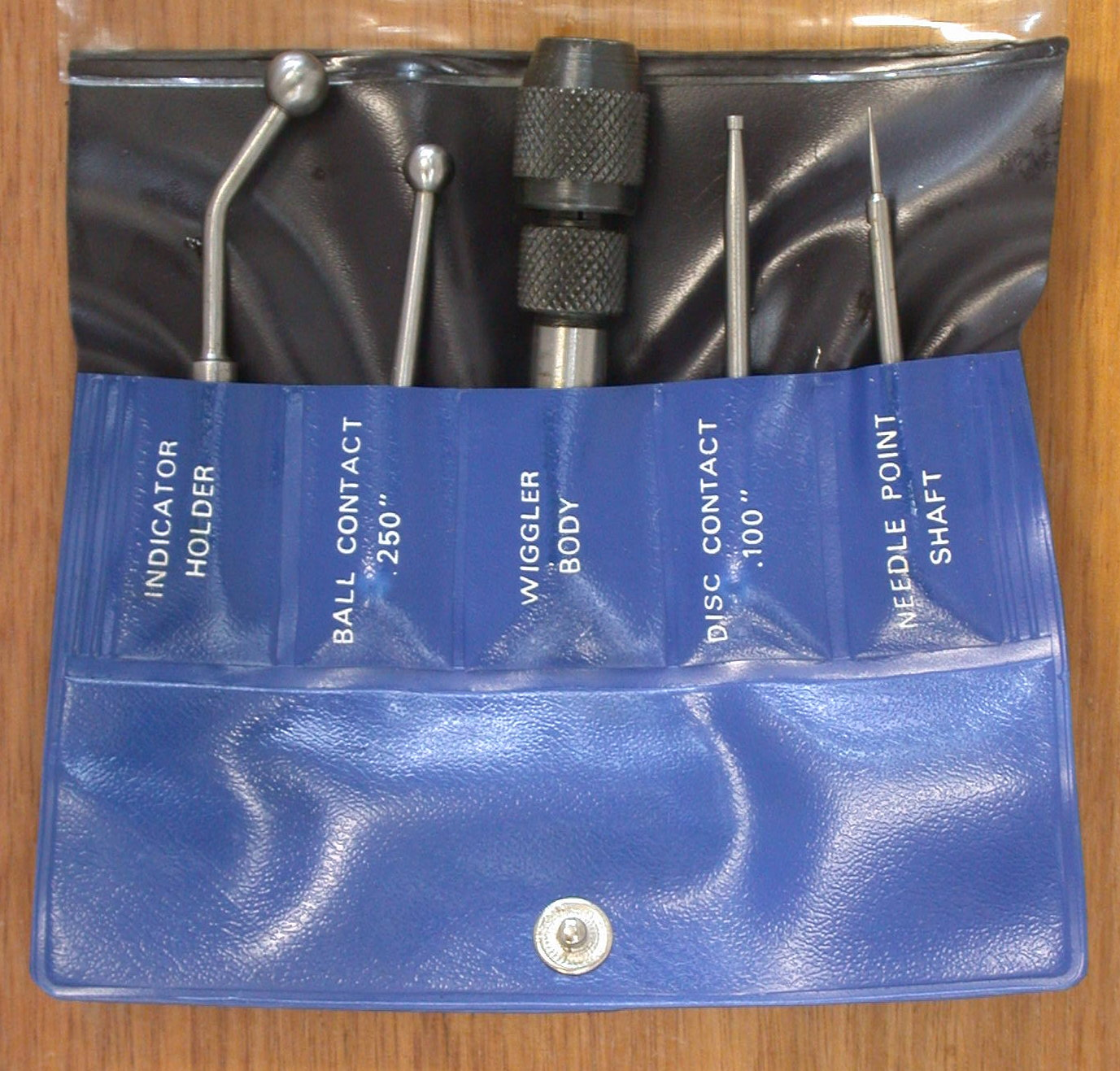
Set of wigglers

A wiggler, also known as a wobbler, edge-finder, center-finder or laser-centering-device, is a tool used with a machine like a mill, to accurately align the machine head with the work prior to machining.

== Edge finder ==
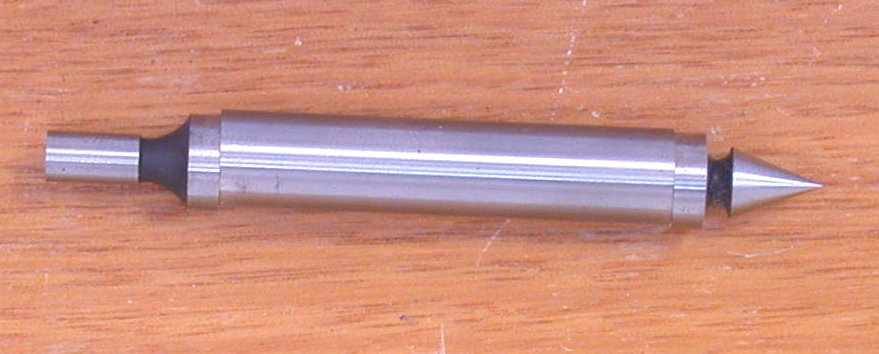
Edge finder

An edge finder is a rotating tool, meaning the machine spindle must be turning for the tool to work. On one end of a cylindrical shank, a second cylinder is attached by a spring running through the center of both cylinders. The second cylinder rotates with the first. The axes of the two cylinders are always parallel, but the mating faces are able to slide against each other. Thus the second cylinder can rotate about a different, but always parallel axis to the first.

As the second cylinder approaches the edge to be located, it is pushed into alignment with the first. When the horizontal distance from the workpiece to the axis of the shank is exactly equal to the radius of the second cylinder, the second cylinder turns perfectly coaxially with the shank. Even a very small displacement in the direction of the workpiece cause the second cylinder to "kick off" and displace dramatically along the workpiece edge.

On the other end, a cone shape is also spring-loaded and is used to locate the center of a previously drilled hole. This style of edge finder is considered to be the most accurate, and its accuracy can be further improved through the use of a collet. In proper setups, a repeatability of 0.0002 in (0.0051 mm) or better can be obtained.

== Electronic edge finder ==
Electronic edge finder

An electronic edge finder, is an instrument that can locate edges of work pieces and also height offsets. It works in a non-rotating spindle, which is a great advantage over its mechanical counterparts. It is battery-operated and works by lighting up its internal LED (usually red) when the electrical circuit formed by the instrument, the workpiece and the machine is closed. The light is thus illuminated when the edge finder is touching the workpiece and is visible through openings in the case. A repeatability of 0.001 in (0.025 mm) can be obtained.

== Center finder ==
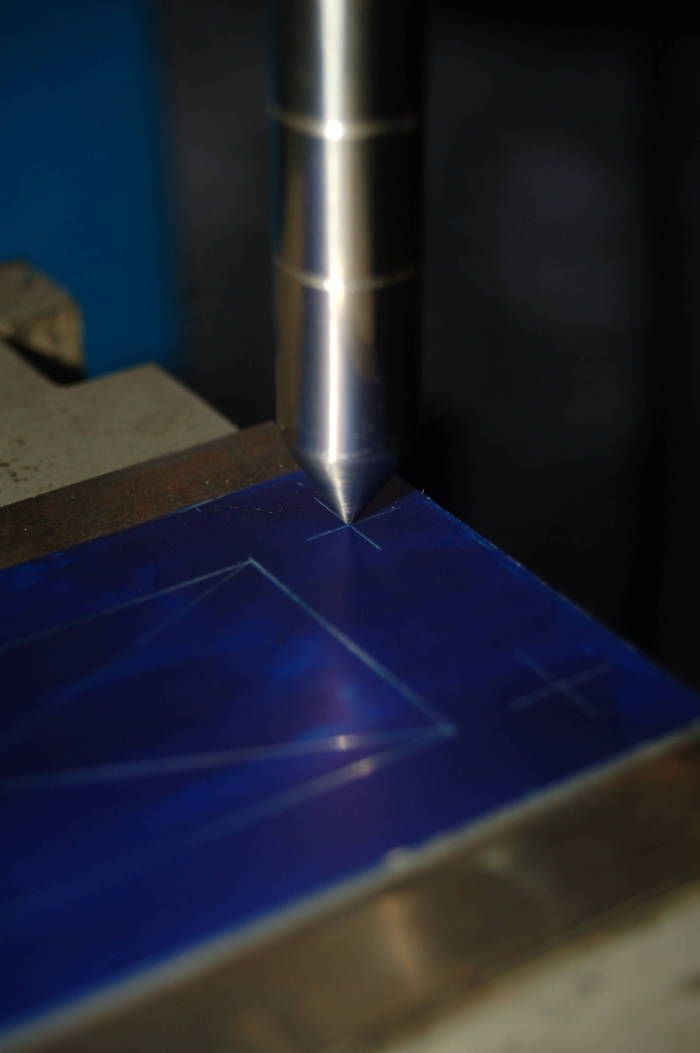
Center finder

A center finder is a tool used to align the machining center to a precision location on a work piece. Often these locations might be marked using a layout method (coating the surface with layout stain and scribing a precise location with the intersection of the two lines identifying the position to be machined, etc. Sometimes a magnifying glass is used to assist in marking the location. One drawback of this method is that it is only as accurate as the lines that are drawn on the part.

In contrast to the edge finder, in the mechanical versions, the tip is not spring-loaded, and it works with the spindle stopped. In laser versions, an 'X' of light is often projected from the machining center onto the work piece and the work piece location is adjusted to align with the intersection of these lines. In contrast to centering devices, the center finder cannot directly find the center of a work piece, thus requires additional calculation, measurement and/or layout method to align to.

== Centering device ==
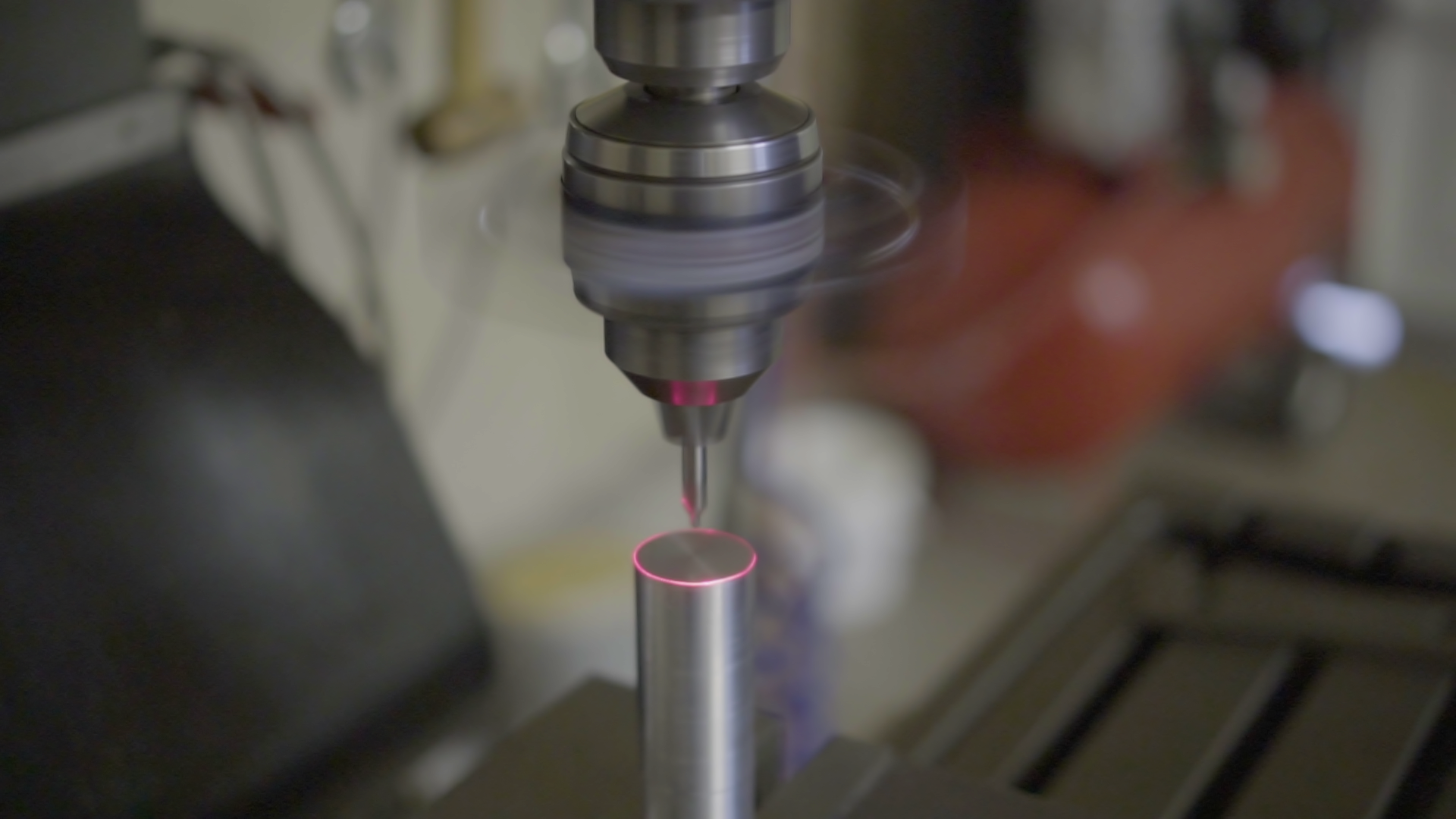
Centering of a shaft with a laser centering device

A centering device is a tool used to accurately adjust and align the center plane or axis of a work piece or work piece feature to the machining center. In contrast to the edge finder, it most often requires no calculation, measurements or layout method markings to allow this alignment. Mechanical versions may work with the spindle stopped. Laser centering devices can be used to cast patterns of light which, depending on angle of the laser, can achieve a high degree of precision.

== See also ==
- Limit switch – Electric switch type
