= Gordon Mulrain =

- Origin: Suffolk, England
- Genres: Reggae, dub, dancehall
- Occupations: Musician, composer, music producer
- Years active: 1983–present
- Label: Ambiel Music

Gordon Mulrain is a British session musician and music producer.

== Music career ==
Gordon Mulrain (a.k.a. Innerheart) has been a performing musician since 12 years of age, in the studio and on the stage. He joined UK reggae outfit Jah Warriors as bass player and toured with Lee Perry, Mikey Dread and Aswad. After 2 studio albums and 5 singles the band split.

Mulrain joined Desmond Dekker and the Aces and performed bass on several tracks later released on compilation albums. As part of the Aces he toured around the UK, Europe and US until the sudden death of Dekker in May 2006. During his time on the road Mulrain also performed with many other artists including Dawn Penn, Mark Morrison, Darien Prophecy, Errol Dunkley, Alton Ellis, YT and Mad Professor.

In the studio he produces various types of music under the name Lost Toys, mixing his programming skills with live drums, bass, guitar, keyboards and percussion to give an authentic sound.

In 2004 Gordon teamed up with Nat Clarkson and together they formed the production name of NJC & Innerheart. Together they co-wrote the majority of the debut album Straight Outta Britain for British reggae & dancehall artist YT. As well as artist development they produced a number of albums together whilst composing music for the media, seeing their compositions used on various advertising campaigns in the UK, US, Southern Hemisphere and many parts of Europe. In 2008 NJC and Innerheart signed an album of reworked instrumentals to German publishing giant Sonoton.

During 2006 Mulrain wrote and produced the debut album Natural Vibes for British reggae artist Darien Prophecy.

In 2007 Mulrain and Clarkson founded Ambiel Music as a record label for their own productions. Ambiel was initially set up as a publishing company by Mulrain with Frances Shelley in 2006.

== Aliases and pseudonyms ==
- Innerheart
- The Innerheart Band
- NJC & Innerheart
- Lost Toys

== Discography ==
=== Studio albums ===
- Straight Outta Britain (2006, Hiptones/Sativa) Role: Producer, musician. Artist album of YT – Retail CD and Digital downloads
- Natural Vibes (2007, Sativa Records/Ambiel Music) Role: Producer, musician. Artist album of Darien Prophecy – Retail CD and Digital downloads
