= Terezín: The Music 1941–44 =

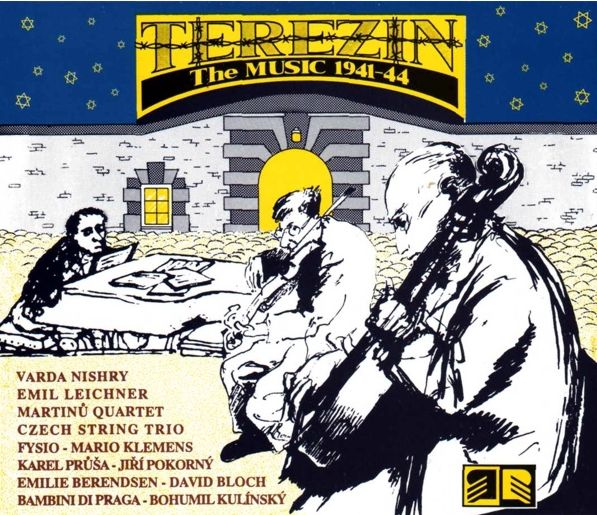

Compilation album by various artists
- Released: 1991
- Genres: Instrumental, chamber music, vocal and choral, opera
- Length: 56:16 and 58:23
- Label: Romantic Robot
- Producer: Alexander Goldscheider

Terezín: The Music 1941–44 is a 2-CD set with music written by inmates at the Terezín concentration camp during World War II.

The collection features music by Pavel Haas, Gideon Klein, Hans Krása, and Viktor Ullmann. Haas, Krása, and Ullmann died in Auschwitz concentration camp in 1944, and Klein died in Fürstengrube in 1945. Much of the music was written towards the end of their lives, in 1943 and 1944. The CDs were produced by Alexander Goldscheider, and released in 1991.

== Track listing ==
=== Volume 1: Chamber Music ===
"Sonata for Piano" (Gideon Klein)

- Piano by Varda Nishry
  1. "Allegro Con Fuoco" – 5:15
  2. "Adagio" – 3:06
  3. "Allegro Vivave" – 2:32

"Trio for Violin, Viola and Cello" (Klein)

- Performed by the Czech String Trio
  4. "Allegro" – 2:13
  5. "Lento – Variations on a Moravian Folk Theme" – 7:17
  6. "Molto Vivace" – 3:12

"String Quartet No.3" (Viktor Ullmann)

- Performed by the Martinů Quartet
  7. "Allegro Moderato" – 4:14
  8. "Presto" – 3:26
  9. "Largo" – 2:54
  10. "Allegro Vivace" – 2:22
11. "Piano Sonata No.6" (Ullmann) – 12:42
  - Piano by Emil Leichner
12. "Tanec" (Hans Krása) – 6:27
  - Performed by the Czech String Trio

=== Volume 2: Songs and Opera ===
1. "Brundibár (Children's Opera in Two Acts)" (Krása) – 25:22
  - Performed by the Bambini di Praga Choir and the Film Symphony Orchestra
  - Chorus master: Bohumil Kulínský Jr.
  - Conductor: Mario Klemens
  - Libretto: Adolf Hoffmeister

Songs (Ullmann)

- Mezzo-soprano vocals by Emilie Berendsen and piano by David Bloch
  2. "Abendphantasie (An Evening Phantasy)" – 4:54
  3. "Immer Inmitten (Ever In the Midst)" – 2:35
  4. "Drei Jiddische Lieder (Three Yiddish Songs)" – 10:55
  5. "Little Cakewalk" – 1:15

Four Songs on Chinese Verse (Pavel Haas)

- Bass vocals by Karel Průša and piano by Jiří Pokorný
  6. "Zaslechl Jsem Divoké Husy (I Heard Wild Geese)" – 2:19
  7. "V Bambusovém Háji (In a Bamboo Grove)" – 2:09
  8. "Daleko Měsíc Je Domova (Far Is the Moon of Home)" – 4:44
  9. "Probdělá Noc (A Sleepless Night)" – 3:14

== See also ==
- The Holocaust in music
