= So What's New? (Horst Jankowski album) =

Studio album by Horst Jankowski
- Released: 1966
- Recorded: 1966
- Genre: Easy Listening
- Label: Mercury Records; SR 61093/MG 21093

Horst Jankowski chronology
More Genius Of Jankowski (1966)	So What's New? (1966)	And We Got Love

So What's New? is a 1966 instrumental album by Horst Jankowski. The album features the humorous piano ballad "So What's New?", which, due to its arrangements of the wind section, can be regarded as a Christmas song. There are two other songs on the album which are famous melodies that sometimes appear in popular culture, namely "My Roman Love Song" and "Highway at Night".

== Track listing ==
1. "So What's New?" – 1:54
2. "Moonlight Cocktail" – 3:08
3. "A Place in the Sun" – 2:59
4. "Exactly You" – 2:55
5. "Grand Amour" – 2:49
6. "Bossa Novissima" – 2:58
7. "Dreamers Concerto" – 2:40
8. "Strangers in the Night" – 3:17
9. "All My Happiness" – 2:33
10. "My Roman Love Song" - 2:08
11. "Paris Parade" - 2:06
12. "Highway at Night" - 3:04

== Production ==
- Arrangers: Horst Jankowski, Bernd Rabe

== Charts ==
Album - Billboard (North America)

Year	Chart	Position
1966	Albums	107
