= Wriggler (video game) =

1985 video game

- Developer: Romantic Robot
- Publisher: Devonshire House
- Platforms: ZX Spectrum, Amstrad CPC
- Release: 1985
- Mode: Single-player

Wriggler is a maze video game for the ZX Spectrum and Amstrad CPC developed by Romantic Robot and published in 1985 by Devonshire House. The original release contained an instrumental track on the B-side titled "Moons of Jupiter", composed by Alexander Goldscheider.

== Gameplay ==
Wriggler is based around maggot racing other maggots. The player controls a maggot and has to escape a maze consisting of 256 screens. The maze is divided into sections: "Garden", "Underground", "Hell", "Planet surface", and "The dungeon".

== Development ==
In-game shot of Wriggler

The graphics, animation and cassette inlay artwork were created by Allin Kempthorne while still at school. He went on to become a writer and cartoonist for The Sun newspaper. He later became an actor and comedian, most noted for writing and starring in the comedy feature film The Vampires of Bloody Island. The Spectrum version was programmed by his twin brother Matthew Kempthorne, and the Amstrad version was programmed by Matthew Kempthorne and David Vivian.

An article on The Making of Wriggler appeared in issue 114 of Retro Gamer Magazine. Written by Graeme Mason, it contains interviews with both Matthew and Allin Kempthorne.

== Reception ==
Reception

Awards
Publication	Award
Crash	Crash Smash
Computer and Video Games	9.5 average out of 10

Wriggler became the Star Game in Personal Computer News and the Game of the Month in CRASH magazine. In Your Sinclair's top 100 ZX Spectrum games of all time, Wriggler was ranked 75th.
