= Nathaniel James Clarkson =

NJC
- Also known as: NJC, Carpe Diem, Blox, Nat Clarxon, Silverback
- Born: Nathaniel James Clarkson; March 8, 1978 (age 48)
- Origin: Suffolk, England
- Genres: Pop, dance, drum and bass, hip hop, reggae, dancehall, R&B, trance, progressive trance, electronic dance music, alternative rock
- Occupations: Music producer, mix engineer, vocal producer, composer, creative director, recording artist development, video director
- Years active: 1998–present
- Labels: Ambiel Music, beat1, NJC Music, JAL, Dance Regime, Hype Music (Extreme & Sony/ATV)
- Website: njcmusic.co.uk

NJC (born Nathaniel James Clarkson; March 8, 1978 in Ipswich) is a British music producer.

== Music career ==
NJC had his debut in 2003 with Dispatches on British drum and bass label L.Plates. It was the guidance of British drum and bass don Digital aka Steve Carr (Drum and Bass producer and DJ) that gave Clarkson his first opportunity to release and develop his music. Over a three-year period Clarkson showcased his ability to fuse different genres like bhangra, reggae, hip hop and live music into his drum and bass productions, garnering him the support from several DJ's including Steve Lamacq, Bobby Friction & Nihal, Digital, Storm, Bailey, DJ Flight, Zinc and Breakage to name a few.

Sativa Records was formed in 2003 by YT, NJC, Digital and Gordon Mulrain who later became the fourth member of Sativa Records collective. In 2004 Clarkson & Mulrain joined together as NJC & Innerheart, and went on to produce 7 of the 13 tracks on Straight Outta Britain the debut album of UK reggae artist YT (Mark Hull, nicknamed Whitey). Clarkson was also introduced to 'Ola' from the then Stage One Music publishing company in London. Clarkson put together a sampler of several productions from various genres and sent over to Stage One Music for consideration. In the winter of 2003 he signed a 3-year publishing deal with Stage One Music. Stage One Music split and Ola founded 'The DML' (The Dance Music Library) which is part of JAL (Just Another Label) for which Clarkson still writes today.

At the start of 2004 Clarkson was commissioned to write a theme tune for PlayStation 2 game Dog's Life. The track was used on the cover-mount DVD in Europe for Official UK PlayStation 2 Magazine. The game Dog's Life was later released around the world and Nat's track was reported to have been used in the Southern Hemisphere for terrestrial TV adverts. Later Sony BMG agreed to an out of court settlement with Stage One Music, as they had not obtained the relevant license to use the song.

In 2007 NJC left Sativa Records to pursue his own solo projects but continued to write music for library and production companies worldwide.

Ambiel Music was launched as a record label in 2007 by NJC and Gordon Mulrain.

In January 2009 NJC was approached by west London-based trance producer and DJ Chris Grabiec. After a number of studio sessions together they established an outlet label for Grabiec's releases. Dance Regime was launched in the winter of 2009 with Grabiec's return to music production, with the single, Guardian Angel.

In the spring of 2011 NJC completed dub step pop EP, The Industry, with Solihull-based singer Charlie O'Neill for Extreme Music (Sony/ATV Music Publishing), the EP was later signed to new label venture Hype Music, which is a partnership between Extreme Music and MTV Networks in the US. The summer of 2011 saw NJC release his first Drum and Bass single in over 5 years, the free download single Cascades features bass player and longtime musical collaborator Mr Lee (The Marvelous).

Many of NJC's productions have been used across all major territories around the world in many mainstream television programs and adverts including Celebrity Big Brother, Hollyoaks, MTV's Jersey Shore & Geordie Shore, Made in Chelsea, MasterChef, Skunked TV, Fifth Gear, The Really Wild Show, America's Next Top Model, Miami Ink and CSI: NY. NJC continues to build his roster and is focussed on the success of his artists and the music they produce. He currently works with Deckajam, Blox, Cosha Don, The Decadent Futurists, Chris Grabiec, Voodoo Browne, Laura Bayston and Spencer Lee Horton developing music for commercial release and licensing.

At the start of 2013 NJC officially launched his side project Blox, an outlet for his experimentations with the artists and musicians that pass through his studio. The debut Blox single "Crazytown" (feat. Spencer Lee Horton and Laura Bayston) was released on 11/11/13 through his own imprint Ambiel Music.

After a turn of events in 2014, NJC took his career back under his own control and ramped up the output through his imprint, Ambiel Music. It was a chance meeting with Andy Lysandrou (Ice Cream Records, beat1) whilst working with Electronic band DeckaJam that he ended up becoming one of the remix artists for the newly formed beat1, a specialist radio and DJ plugging service. This is where NJC conceived his latest AKA, Carpe Diem, whilst remixing the new artists that come through the books. Along with remixing, NJC also offered his web knowledge and app development skills to the team and soon became the main brains behind the content delivery application used by the registered DJ's.

== Discography ==
=== Studio albums ===
- Straight Outta Britain (2006, Hiptones/Sativa) Role: Producer, vocal producer, mix engineer, composer. Artist album of YT - Retail CD, Double 12" Vinyl and Digital downloads
- Real Musician (2007, Sativa Records) Role: Executive producer, producer, composer. Artist album of Bongo Chilli - Retail CD and Digital downloads
- Substance & Rhythms (2007, Unsigned) Role: Executive producer, producer, vocal producer, mix engineer. Unreleased album of British band The Marvelous
- Pride and Honour (2011, Dance Regime / Ambiel Music) Role: Co-producer, vocal producer, mix engineer. Debut album of Chris Grabiec
- Browne Saucery (2011, Ambiel Music) Role: Executive producer, producer, vocal producer, mix engineer, composer. Debut album of Voodoo Browne

=== Selected singles ===
- Dispatches/Feelz Good (2003, L.Plates) NJC Feat Shelley Dee. Genre: Drum and Bass. 12" Vinyl - Debut
- Shakedown/Never Too Late (2006, Unsigned) Role: Producer, vocal producer, mix engineer, engineer. Genre: Indie Rock. Limited run white label CD.

=== Selected compilations ===
- Hogaya Hai Tujh Ko (Feel the Buzz) - Streets of Bollywood 2 - Feat YT (2008, Moviebox) Retail CD and Digital downloads. This single was also played by John Peel on one of his last radio shows on BBC Radio 1.
- Nu Steppa - DJ Digital and Nat Clarxon Remix on One Drop East (2003, EMI Australia), Double edition remix CD album.

=== Selected remixes ===
- Loving You (Ole Ole Ole) (2002, Edel Records) - Brian Harvey and The Refugee Crew (NJC & Danny J) - White label
- Longtime - Salmonella Dub (2005, EMI Australia) - Sativa Records Remix Feat YT - CD
- Let's Play - Cherrybytes (2011, 100% Records/Cherrybyte) - NJC Remix - Download E.P.
- 24 Hours - Otis ft. Ayo Beats, Flirta D (Beat1UK) 2015
- Not Enough Carpe Diem Remix - Kit Rice (White Label - Beat1UK) 2015

=== Production music ===
- Industry (2011, Hype Music/MTV Networks) Charlie O'Neill. Role: Executive producer, producer, mix engineer, composer
- No Stoppin' Me NJC & Sun-Me | Teen Wolf Mid-Season 3 Part.2 Trailer Music (2014 Scene: Mid-Season 3 Part.2 Trailer)
