= Videoface =

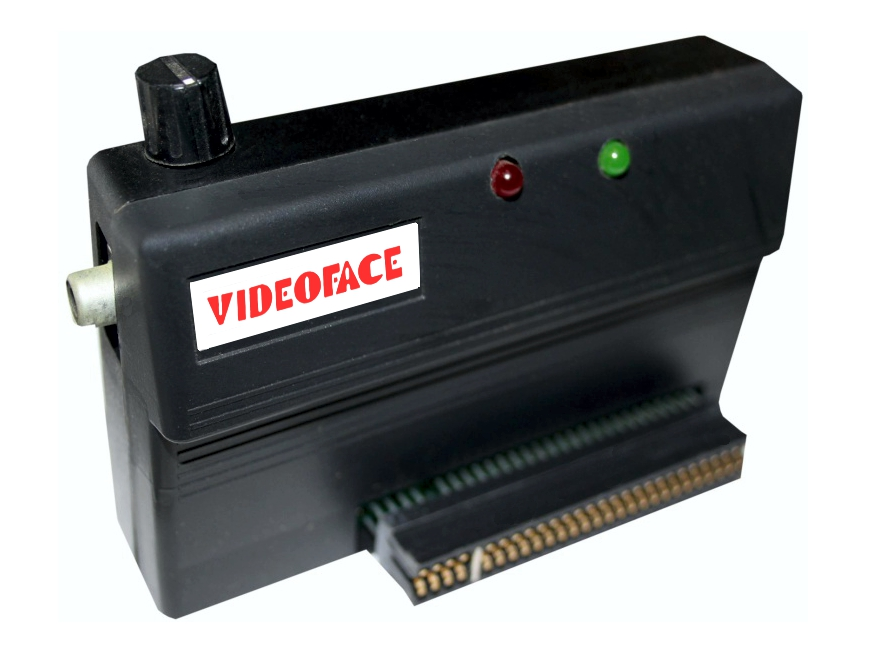
A Videoface

Videoface Digitizer is a video digitizer interface for the ZX Spectrum home computer. It was produced by Data-Skip from The Netherlands in 1986 and later on by Romantic Robot UK Ltd from UK in 1987. It was originally sold for £69, but the price dropped to £30 within a few years.

Videoface takes signal from any video source with composite video out capability. It produces a g grayscale 256 × 192 pixel image with 4-bit (16 level) intensity levels. Scanning speed is just below four frames per second. These screens can be saved as single pictures or animations with variable speed, and later loaded into any drawing program for editing. During scanning, the contrast of the picture can be adjusted by turning the knob on top of the Videoface, and the picture can be shifted horizontally and vertically.
