= Multiface =

Computer accessory

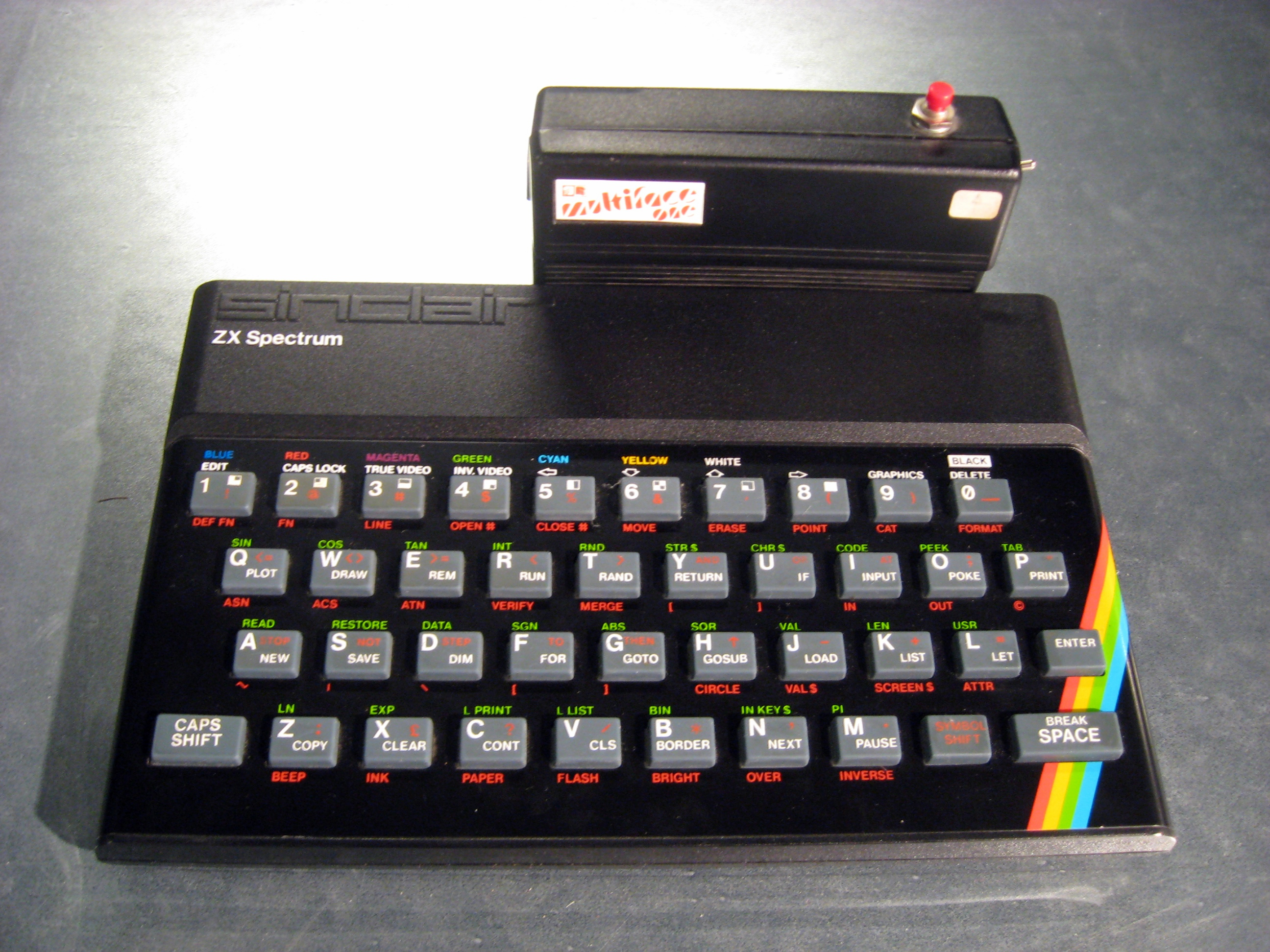
ZX Spectrum with a Multiface One

The Multiface is a hardware peripheral released by Romantic Robot for several 1980s home computers. The primary function of the device was to dump the computer's memory to external storage. Pressing a red button on the Multiface activated it. As most games of the era did not have a save game feature, the Multiface allowed players to save their position by saving a loadable snapshot of the game. Home computer software of the early 1980s was typically loaded into RAM in one go, with copy protection measures concentrating the loading phase or just after it. The snapshot feature could be used after copy protection routines had been executed, to create a backup that was effectively unprotected against unauthorised distribution. Later models of the Multiface mitigated this by requiring the device to be present when re-loading the dumps into memory, making the dumps useless to people without a Multiface. Software producers also reacted to the threat by using routines that would prevent execution of the product if it detected that a Multiface was present and by loading the software in multiple parts, thus requiring the presence of the original, copy-protected media.

== Operation ==
Pressing the red button on the Multiface raised the non-maskable interrupt line on the computer's processor, effectively taking control of the computer. The Multiface would then page in its own ROM, temporarily replacing the computer's operating system with that within the Multiface.

== Additional features ==
- All Multifaces had the ability to view and edit the contents of memory. This made cheating in games especially easy: magazines used to print codes every month, known as 'pokes'. By changing the memory, various aspects of the game could be altered, such as the number of lives one had before the game was over.
- Some models of Multiface allowed the user to save a screenshot, and this is how Your Sinclair and likely other magazines produced screenshots of games.
- Multifaces contained an extra 8 kilobytes of RAM that could be used by specially written software. Examples of such software included Genie, a machine code disassembler, and Lifeguard, a program for analysing the memory of a game during play in order to identify which memory locations should be changed to aid cheating. These programs could be loaded into the Multiface RAM and activated by pressing the red button.
- Some later Multifaces had a 'thru-port', an additional interface on the back of the unit which allowed other peripherals to be plugged into the back. This solved the problem of the Multiface using up the computer's only expansion port.

== Models of Multiface ==
Multifaces were released for 8-bit and 16-bit microcomputers, such as the ZX Spectrum, Amstrad CPC & Atari ST. Different models had slightly different features.

=== Multiface One ===
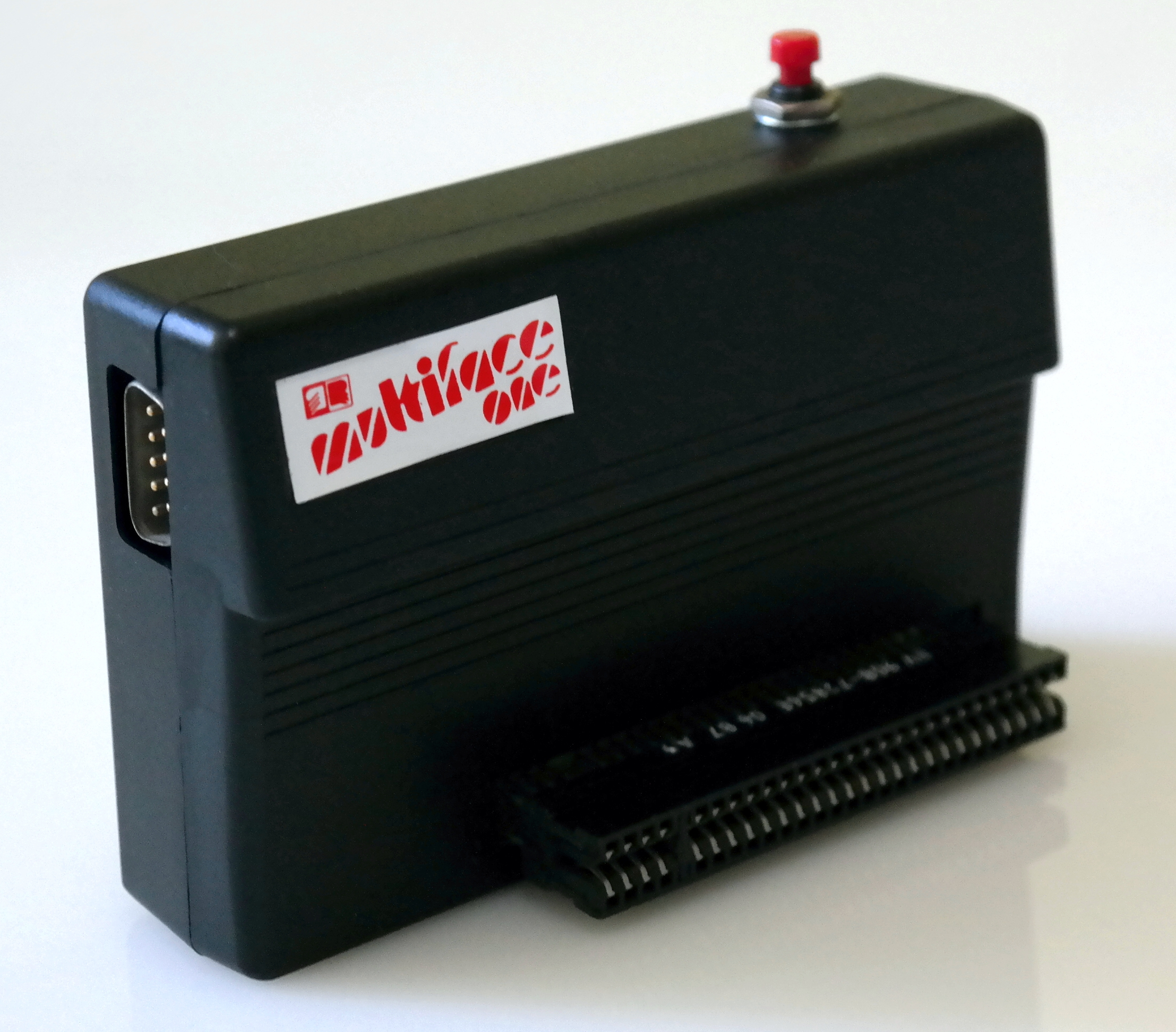
A Multiface One

The Multiface One was released in 1986 for the ZX Spectrum 48K. It initially cost £39.95 (equivalent to £148 in 2023) and had the capability of saving data to cassette tape, ZX Microdrive, Opus Discovery (an external 3.5 inch disk drive) or Technology Research Beta (an interface that allowed 5.25 inch and 3.5 inch drives to be connected). The device worked on 128K Spectrums, but only if they were put in 48K mode. It featured a Kempston joystick port, and later revisions contained a switch that effectively 'hid' the device from software. Early versions had a composite video out port but this feature was later removed.

=== Multiface Two ===
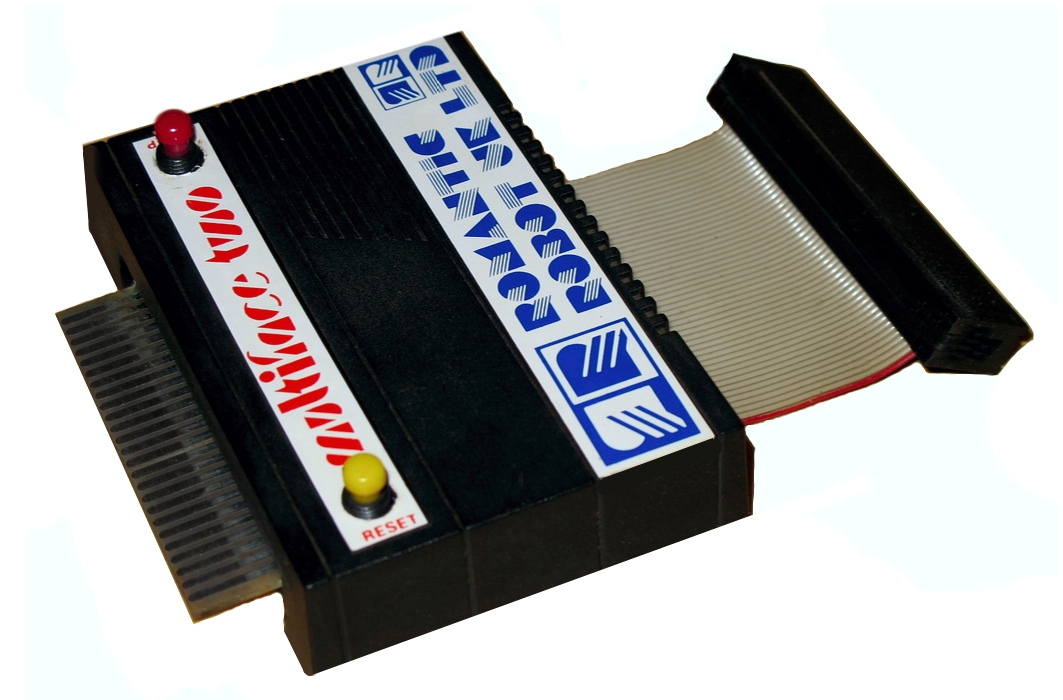
A Multiface Two

The Multiface Two was released for the Amstrad CPC range of computers and had similar features to the Multiface One, but added a button to reset the computer. Control of the visibility of the device was at a software level rather than the hardware switch found on the Multiface One.

=== Multiface 128 ===
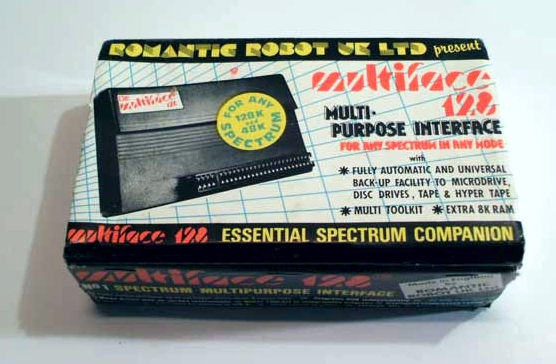
Multiface 128 box

The Multiface 128 was released in April 1987 for the 128K version of the Spectrum, including the original +2 model. It worked in 128K or 48K mode and it existed in two versions; initially without a 'thru-port' and later, with one, both of which originally cost the same £44.95, (equivalent to £160 in 2023) but were later reduced to the same price as the Multiface One. The 128 introduced the ability to save to the +D and DISCiPLE disk systems, but lost its joystick port (the Spectrum +2 already had built-in joystick ports). The device was not compatible with the later Spectrum +2A or the Spectrum +3.

=== Multiface 3 ===
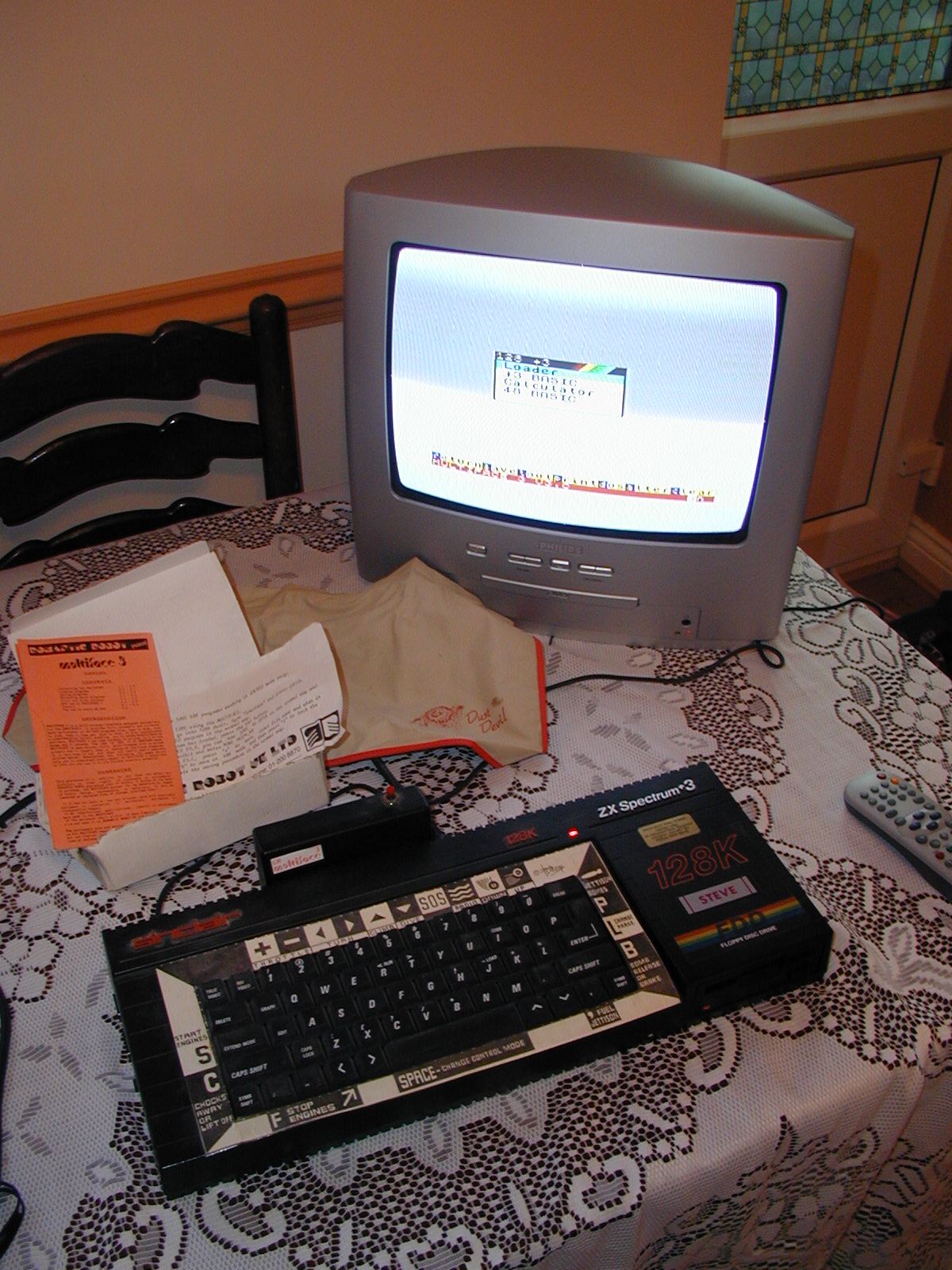
Sinclair Spectrum +3 computer with Multiface 3 peripheral attached. Connected to TV and showing boot up screen. The paper keyboard overlay is for a game.

The Multiface 3, released in November 1987, was designed for the later Amstrad-made models of Spectrum that the 128 did not support. It existed in two versions; one with a 'thru-port', for £49.95 (equivalent to £177 in 2023), and one without, which cost £44.95 (equivalent to £152 in 2023). Both were later reduced to £29.95 (equivalent to £78 in 2023). The main feature of the Multiface 3 was its ability to save to +3 disk, a useful feature for +3 owners who wanted to avoid the long loading times of tapes.

=== Multiface ST ===
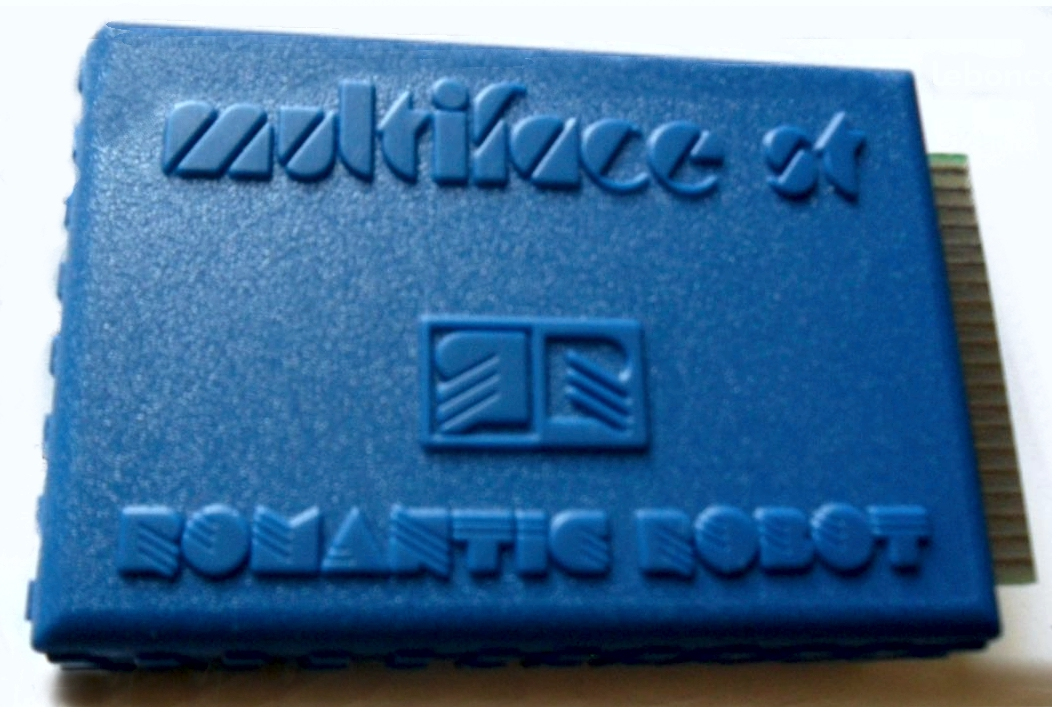
A Multiface ST

The Multiface ST and Multiface ST II were released for Atari's ST computers. They connected to the cartridge port with a wired connector attaching to the monitor port (to generate the interrupt signal when the button was pressed). Far less effective than the earlier Spectrum models and the same as the CPC model, they required the cartridge to be present in order to load saved games. Red, green and blue cartridges have been noted.

== Anti-Multiface ==
Anti-Multiface was a public domain program for the Amstrad CPC which allowed the restoring of saved memory dumps without the need for a Multiface to be present. It was limited to 128K machines and would not work on dumps bigger than 64K. The program was developed by Serge Querne but credited to "Merlin J. Bond of Magic Software".

== Similar products ==
Competing devices included the Mirage Imager, Disk Wizard, and Action Replay. At the time, none of these could save as many games, or offered the opportunities for cheating that Multiface did. Action Replays for cheating have since been released on newer systems. Other competing systems were a wide array of software-based transfer programs.

For game consoles of the 1990s there was the Game Genie, which served a similar purpose in allowing memory values to be edited in order to cheat at games.
