= Wiggle It =

Wiggle It may refer to:

- "Wiggle It" (2 in a Room song), 1990
- "Wiggle It" (Ricki-Lee Coulter song), 2008
- "Wiggle It", a 2019 song by French Montana
