= Horst Jankowski =

German pianist (1936–1998)

- Born: 30 January 1936; Berlin, Germany
- Died: 29 June 1998 (aged 62)
- Occupation: Musician
- Labels: BASF; Metronome; MPS Records; Mercury

Horst Jankowski (30 January 1936 – 29 June 1998) was a classically trained German pianist, most famous for his internationally successful easy listening music.

== Biography ==
Born in Berlin, Jankowski studied at the Berlin Music Conservatory and played jazz in Germany in the 1950s. In 1953 and 1954 he was a member of Kurt Hohenberger's orchestra, then pianist for singer Caterina Valente until 1955.

Jankowski's fame as a composer of easy listening pop peaked in 1965 with his instrumental "Eine Schwarzwaldfahrt", released in English as "A Walk in the Black Forest". The tune became a pop hit, reaching No. 1 on the US easy listening chart, No. 12 on the US Billboard Hot 100, No. 2 in Canada, and No. 3 on the UK Singles Chart. It sold over one million copies, and was awarded a gold disc. The track was featured on the BBC's review of the 1960s music scene, Pop Go The Sixties, broadcast on BBC One and ZDF, on 31 December 1969. It can be heard in a 1962 episode of Perry Mason (1957 TV series) (S5E23 "The Case of the Absent Artist"). This track has become a signature song at Plymouth Argyle F.C., being played at the end of each game as the fans leave the ground. The song also featured as a running joke in the episode "Radio Goodies" of the 1970s BBC TV series The Goodies, as the only record possessed by the group's radio station.

The Genius of Jankowski album, released in 1965, was also a million seller. Jankowski went on to score a string of successful albums, but moved on in the 1970s to concentrate more on jazz, including covers of pop and rock hits. Between 1989 and 1994 Jankowski composed and performed easy listening music for Sonoton, Germany.

Jankowski died of lung cancer in 1998, at the age of 62.

== Discography ==
- My Fair Lady Mit Horst Jankowski (1964; Mercury Records)
- The Genius of Jankowski! (1964; Mercury Records) US No. 18
- More Genius of Jankowski (1965; Mercury Records) US No. 65
- Still More Genius of Jankowski (1966; Mercury Records) US No. 107; CAN No. 11
- So What's New? (1966; Mercury Records)
- And We Got Love (1967; Mercury Records)
- With Love (1967; Mercury Records)
- Baby, But Grand (1967; Mercury Records)
- Piano Affairs (1967; Mercury Records)
- The Many Moods of Jankowski (1968; Mercury Records)
- The Horst Jankowski Scene (1968; Mercury Records)
- Play A Simple Melody (1968, Mercury Records)
- Jankowski Plays Jankowski (1969; Mercury Records)
- A Walk in the Evergreens (1969; Mercury Records)
- Jankowski Meets Beethoven (1970; Mercury Records)
- Piano on the Rocks (1970; Mercury Records)
- Jankowskingsize – For Nightpeople Only (1970; MPS)
- Jankowskeyboard (1970; MPS)
- Jerusalem (1971; Rediffusion)
- Jankowski Plays Latin (1971; Columbia Records)
- Follow Me (1972; Intercord)
- International (1973; Intercord)
- Happy Polka (1973; Intercord)
- Return to the Black Forest (1975; Rediffusion)
- Yes Sir, That's My Baby (1976; EMI Records)
- Happy Blue Piano (1982; Sonoton / Intersound)
- The Best of Mr. Black Forest (1989; Sonoton / Intersound)
- Piano Interlude (1994; Sonoton / Intersound)
- Black Forest Explosion! (1997; Motor Music)
- Eine Schwarzwaldfahrt (1998; Mercury Records)
- Jankowskinetik (2003; Universal)
- Jankowskeynotes (2004; Universal)
- Remember Mr. Black Forest (2015; Memorylane / Intersound)

With Johnny Hodges

- Johnny Hodges and His Strings Play the Prettiest Gershwin (Verve, 1958)

== See also ==
- List of artists who reached number one on the U.S. Adult Contemporary chart
