= Klarinettenquartett Cl-4 =

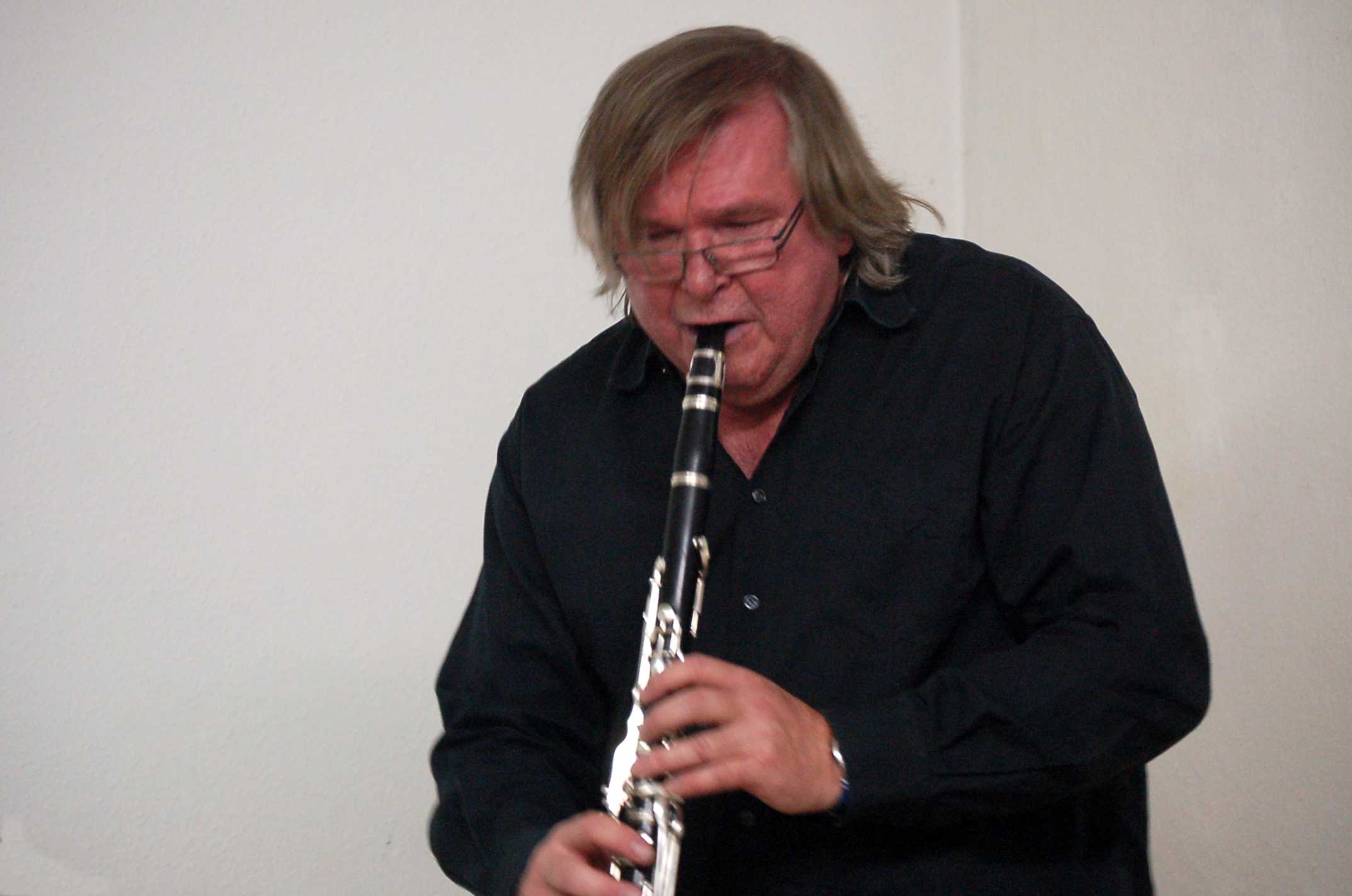
- Theo Jörgensmann, co-founder of Cl-4
- Past members: Theo Jörgensmann (Germany); Lajos Dudas (Hungary); Eckard Koltermann (Germany); Dieter Kühr (Germany); Denis Colin (France); Bob Driessen (Netherlands)

The Klarinettenquartett Cl-4 was one of a few clarinet chamber jazz ensembles in the 1980s. This international ensemble based in Germany existed from 1985 to 1988. The group integrated elements of jazz, folk, and European concert music into their music without wanting to belong to the Third Stream.

== Discography ==
Title	Year	Label
Alte und neue Wege	1986	Konnex Records
Seltsam ist Propheten Lied	1987	Konnex Records
Music for clarinet	1997	Pannon Classic
