= Vitold Rek =

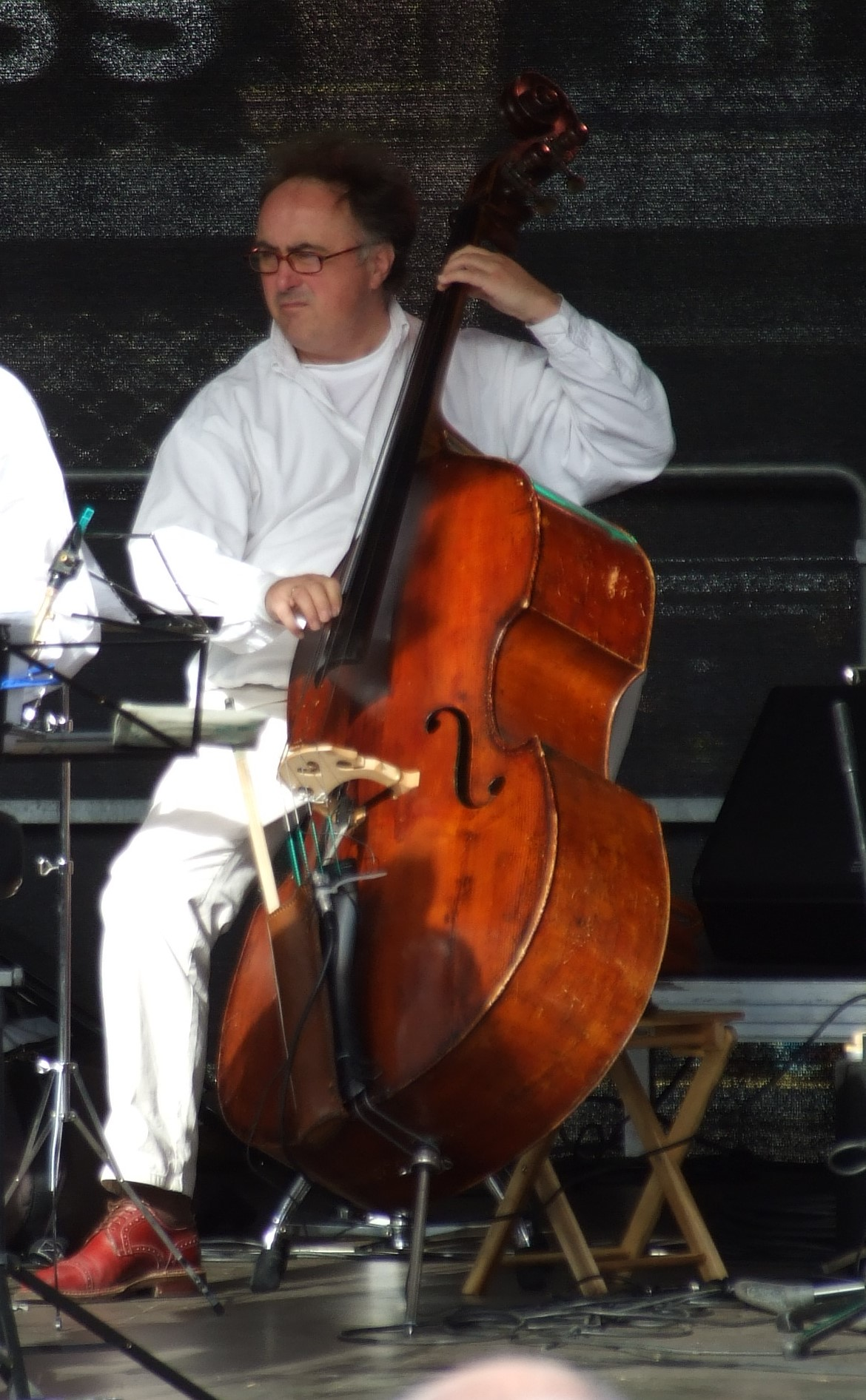
Vitold Rek (2009)

Vitold Rek (* October 18, 1955 in Rzeszów, Poland as Witold E. Szczurek) is a double bassist, composer and music educator. He studied classical double bass at the Academy of Music in Kraków when Krzysztof Penderecki was rector there. His playing "unites jazz influences with classical and East European folk elements", with a focus on live performance and composition.

== Career ==
Rek's festival appearances include Montreux Jazz Festival, London Jazz Festival, North Sea Jazz (The Hague), Willisau Jazz Festival, Berlin Jazz Festival, ISB Double Bass Convention USA, Mexico Jazz Festival, Banlieus Bleues Festival in Paris and the Jazz Jamboree in Warsaw among many others. Concerts have taken him also to Mozambique, Cuba and Mexico. He has performed in the Purcell Room in London and in the Paris Olympia.

Charlie Mariano, John Tchicai, Albert Mangelsdorff, Karl Berger, Vladislav Sendecki, Tomasz Stanko, Günter Baby Sommer, Dom Um Romao, Peter Giger, Emil Mangelsdorff, Gerd Dudek, Heinz Sauer, Ralf Hübner, Bob Degen, Christof Lauer, Makaya Ntshoko and Shlomo Carlebach have featured among his key musical partners. He collaborates with the Frankfurt Radio HR Jazz Ensemble.

Vitold also enjoys his work with German writers, combining spoken poetry with his own solo performance. He works closely with the poet Johann P. Tammen and other partners have included Volker Braun, Oskar Ansull, Sarah Kirsch and Kito Lorenc.

He teaches jazz double bass and coaches ensembles at both the Hochschule für Musik, Mainz and the Hochschule für Musik, Frankfurt.

In 2008 Vitold Rek was honored twice: with Tomasz Stanko’s 5-CD album "1970-1975-1984-1986-1988" - Platinum Prize in Poland - and with Emil Mangelsdorff’s CD "Blues Forever" - Preis der Deutschen Schallplattenkritik 2008 in Germany.

In November 2008 Vitold Rek performed as soloist the premiere of Jazz Concerto Grosso (composed by Piotr Wrobel) for double bass, flute (soloist Jadwiga Kotnowska) and symphony orchestra during the Polish Chamber Music Festival in Warsaw.

== Discography ==
- Flyin’ Lady - Jan Pt. Wroblewski Quartet (Muza Pl.); 1978
- Live at Aquarium - Sunship (Poljazz Pl.); 1979
- Follow us - Sunship (Muza Pl.); 1979
- Tomasz Stanko - Tomasz Stanko (Poljazz Pl.); 1982
- Musik '81 - Tomasz Stanko (Muza Pl.); 1982
- C.O.C.X. - Tomasz Stanko (Pronit Pl.); 1983
- Lady Go - Tomasz Stanko (Muza Pl.); 1984
- Freelectronic - Tomasz Stanko (Poljazz Pl.); 1986
- Peyotl - Tomasz Stanko (Poljazz Pl.); recorded 1986
- Freelectronic: The Montreux Performance - Tomasz Stanko (ITM 0023); 1987
- Basspace - Vitold Rek Basspace (Poljazz Pl.); 1984
- Basspace 555555 - Vitold Rek Basspace (Muza Pl.); 1985
- The Spark - Solo (Poljazz Pl.); 1986
- Condemned To Life - V.R. mit Olga Szwajgier (Muza Pl.); 1987
- Family Jewels - Family of Percussion & Friends (Jazz Network 66.667); 1988
- Acoustic - Stan Soyka (Zic-Zac PL.); 1991
- Satisfaction - John Tchicai, Vitold Rek (Enja CD 7033-2); 1991
- POPendingEYE - Alfred 23 Harth's Quasar Quartet (Free Flow Music 0493); 1993
- Art Of The Duo Vol.1 John Tchicai, Vitold Rek (Enja 8008-2); 1993
- Jazz - with Peter Giger and Gerd Dudek B+W 029 GB); 1993
- Mozambique Meets Europe - Family of Percussion & Friends (B+W031 GB); 1993
- Elvira Plenar-Vitold Rek - with Elvira Plenar (Bellaphon CDLR 45089); 1994
- Mondspinner - with Christof Lauer & Ralf Hübner (Free Flow Music 0796); 1996
- On Remote Patrol - with Michael Baird (SWP 004); 1996
- Das Erik Satie Projekt - Fritz Hartschuh Quartet (Konnex KCD 5086); 1998
- East West Wind - Live at the St. Ingbert Jazz Festival 1997, Germany (TMP 501)
- Bassifiddle alla polacca - Vitold Rek Solo - double bass, vocals (TMP 503); 1997 & 1998
- John Tchicai, Vitold Rek, Karl Berger - 2 x 2 (TMP 505; 1991, 1992 & 2000;
- The Polish Folk Explosion - Kapela Resoviana feat. Albert Mangelsdorff, Charlie Mariano, John Tchicai, Vitold Rek, Gilbert Matthews (TMP 507; 2001
- Johann P. Tammen & Vitold Rek - Die Erde, das singende Brot (TMP CD 401); 2002
- Charlie Mariano & Vitold Rek - opus absolutum (TMP CD 509; 2003
- Charlie Mariano & Vitold Rek feat. Peter Reiter - Cathedral vol. 1 (TMP CD 611); 2005
- East West Wind - Home featuring Jaroslaw Bester & Ramesh Shotham (TMP CD 515); 2007
- Emil Mangelsdorff Quartet "Blues Forever" (Bellaphon CDLR 714427)
- Hessischer Rundfunk Jazzensemble "Unauffällige Festansage" with Albert Mangelsdorff, Christof Lauer, Ralf Hübner, Heinz Sauer, Emil Mangelsdorff, Joki Freund (Jazzwerkstatt 2008)
- Tomasz Stanko "1970-1975-1984-1986-1988" (Metal Mind Productions); 2008

== Sources ==
- "Das Jazz Buch" Joachim Ernst Berendt/Günter Heusmann (Fischer Verlag 1953-2005, Germany)
- "Jazz Lexikon" Martin Kunzler (Rowohlt Verlag 2002, Germany)
- "New Grove Dictionary of Jazz" Barry Kernfeld/Wolfram Knauer (Grove, England 2001)
- "Der Frankfurt Sound" Jürgen Schwab (SocietätsVerlag 2004, Germany)
- "Encyklopedia Muzyki Popularnej, Jazz" D.Piatkowski (Atena 2000, Poland)
- "Leksykon Polskiej Muzyki Rozrywkowej" R.Wolanski (Morex 1995, Poland)
- "Encyklopedia Rzeszowa" (RS Druk, 2004, Poland)
