= Günter Lenz =

German jazz bassist and composer (1938–2026)

Günther Lenz
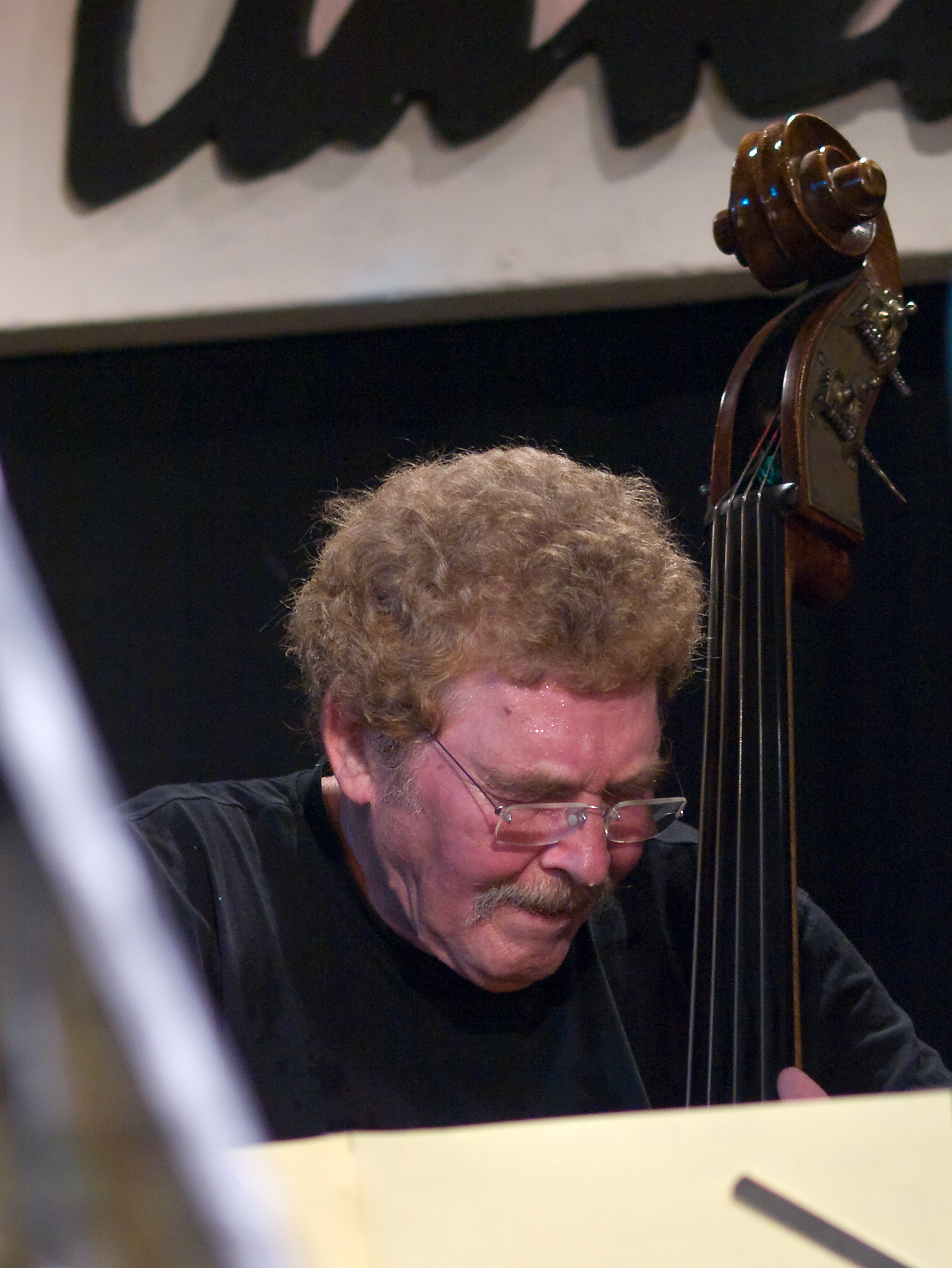
- Lenz performing in 2009

Background information
- Born: 25 July 1938; Frankfurt am Main, Germany
- Died: 26 June 2026 (aged 87)
- Occupations: Jazz bassist; Composer; Academic teacher
- Instrument: Double bass
- Website: www.myspace.com/guenterlenzofficial

Günter Lenz (25 July 1938 – 26 June 2026) was a German jazz bassist and composer. He played in notable formations, beginning with the Albert Mangelsdorff Quintet in 1961. He was the bassist on the iconic 1965 album Astigmatic. In the late 1970s he founded his own band, Springtime.

== Life and career ==
Lenz was born in Frankfurt am Main on 25 July 1938. He first taught himself guitar and then studied with Carlo Bohländer, playing jazz in the clubs of the U.S. Army from 1954 onwards. During national service in 1959–60, he switched to the bass. In 1961 Albert Mangelsdorff picked him up as member of the Albert Mangelsdorff Quintet.

Lenz also become a member of the hr-jazz ensemble of state broadcaster Hessischer Rundfunk, for which he also arranged and composed. In 1965 he worked in the quintet of Krzysztof Komeda, taking part in the recording of the album Astigmatic. In 1968 he played with Joachim Kühn and Aldo Romano in a band led by Barney Wilen at the Berlin Jazz Days. He toured internationally with The German All Stars in 1969 and 1971. He played with the George Russell Sextet, and also with a band led by singer Leon Thomas, gaining big band experience.

In the 1970s Lenz was a member of the Kurt Edelhagen Big Band and the moved to Munich where he worked with Jerry van Rooyen and Peter Herbolzheimer in his Rhythm Combination & Brass (Scenes (Live At Ronnie Scott's Club). Chet Baker, Coleman Hawkins, Oliver Nelson and Benny Bailey engaged him for their concert tours and record productions, as well as German musicians such as Eugen Cicero, Horst Jankowski and Volker Kriegel. In 1972 Günter Lenz played with Lightning Hopkins.

In the mid-1970s, Lenz joined the drummer Peter Giger in "Clarinet Contrast", an avantgarde band with Perry Robinson, Theo Jörgensmann, Bernd Konrad and Michel Pilz. He recorded as a member of the Manfred Schoof Quintet for ECM/Japo.

In the late 1970s he founded his band Günter Lenz Springtime, playing international jazz-fusion with members such as pianist Bob Degen, trumpeter Claus Stötter, drummer Joe Nay, Frank St. Peter, Johannes Faber, Leszek Zadlo.

He recorded with the Berlin Contemporary Jazz Orchestra. In 1991 he recorded "Life at the Montreux Music Festival" in trio-formation with Uli Lenz and Allen Blairman. Lenz also created orchestral arrangements for Plácido Domingo.

Lenz taught at the Musikhochschule Stuttgart for 20 years, from 2001 to 2006 as professor.

In 2004 Lenz received the Hesse Jazz prize awarded by the State Minister for Higher Education, Research and the Arts, Udo Corts.

Lenz died on 26 June 2026, at the age of 87.

== Discography ==
- Komeda, Stańko, Namysłowski, Lenz: Astigmatic (Polonia Records, 1998, rec. 1965)
- The German All Stars: In Südamerika (CBS 1969, with Ack van Rooyen, Manfred Schoof, Albert Mangelsdorff, Rudi Füsers, Rolf Kühn, Emil Mangelsdorff, Gerd Dudek, Heinz Sauer, Wolfgang Dauner, Ralf Hübner, Willie Johanns)
- Beebelaar, Joos, Lenz: Book of Family Affairs (HGBS, 2013)

With Springtime

- Znel (Mood Records 1978)
- Roaring Plenties (L+R Records, 1980)
- Majorleague (L+R Records, 1992)
- Strict Minimum (JazzWerkstatt 2007)

With hr-Jazzensemble

- Colin Wilkie, Shirley Hart, Albert Mangelsdorff, Joki Freund und das Jazz-Ensemble des Hessischen Rundfunks Wild Goose (MPS Records 1969)
- Atmospheric Conditions Permitting (ECM, 1967–1993)
- Perpetual Questions (HR-Musik, 1996–2004)
- Unauffällige Festansage (JazzWerkstatt 2005–2008)

As Sideman

- Albert Mangelsdorff Quintet: Tension (CBS, 1963)
- Albert Mangelsdorff Quintet: Now Jazz Ramwong (CBS, 1964)
- Albert Mangelsdorff Quintet: Folk Mond and Flower Dream (CBS, 1967)
- Albert Mangelsdorff Quartet: Never Let It End (MPS, 1970)
- Leon Thomas: Leon Thomas in Berlin (Flying Dutchman, 1971) with Oliver Nelson
- Schoof Quintet: Scales (ECM, 1976)
- Heinz Sauer Quartet: Cherry Bat (Enja, 1989)
- Berlin Contemporary Jazz Orchestra: Berlin Contemporary Jazz Orchestra (ECM, 1990)

Live In Bremen

- Schoof Quintet: Resonance (ECM, 2009)
- Manfred Schoof: Live In Bremen (MIG, 2022)
- A Timeless Place (Enodoc Rocords, 2026)
