= Pagine Gialle =

Live album by German Clarinet Duo
- Released: 2001
- Recorded: Loft, Cologne; February 18, 1995
- Genre: Improvised music, jazz
- Length: 51:26
- Label: Hathut Records
- Producer: German Clarinet Duo

Professional ratings
Review scores
Source	Rating
AllMusic	3/5 stars
Penguin Guide to Compact Discs	4/4 stars

Pagine Gialle is the second live album released by German Clarinet Duo.

== Track listing ==
1. Pagine Gialle, Pt. 1 – 9:31
2. Pagine Gialle, Pt. 2 – 15:37
3. Pagine Gialle, Pt. 3 – 11:32
4. Pagine Gialle, Pt. 4 – 9:08
5. Pagine Gialle, Pt. 5 – 5:35

== Personnel ==
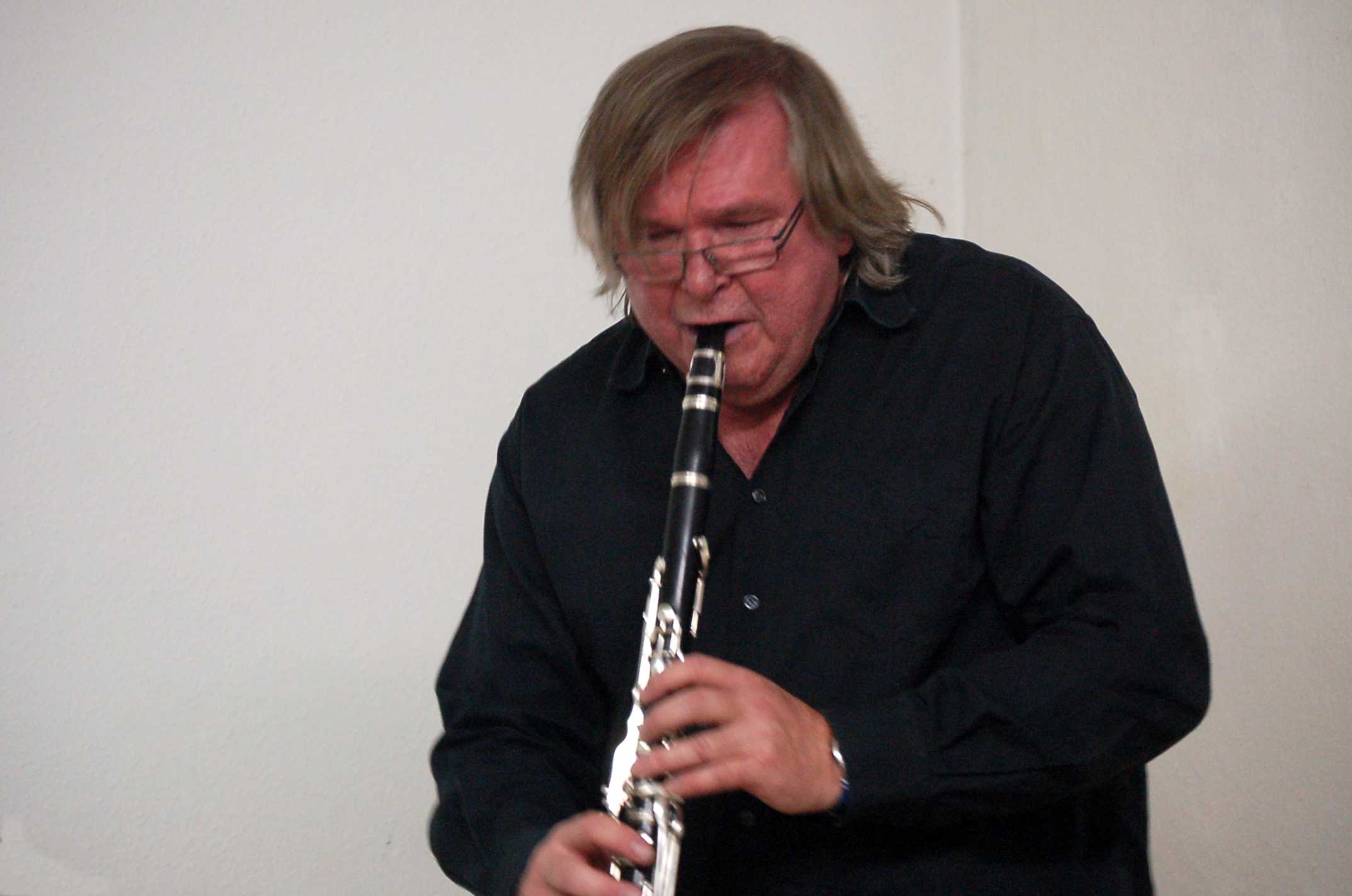
Theo Jörgensmann, 2009.

- Theo Jörgensmann – clarinet
- Eckard Koltermann – bass clarinet
