= Progressive music (disambiguation) =

Progressive music is a type of music that experiments with alternative routes. It may also refer to:

== Genres ==
- Progressive folk, originating in the 1930s
- Progressive jazz, referring to various genres of jazz from the 1940s–70s
- Progressive bluegrass, originating in the 1960s and 1970s
- Progressive pop, originating in the mid-1960s
- Progressive rock, originating in the late 1960s
  - Art rock, originating in the late 1960s, sometimes used synonymously with progressive rock
  - Progressive metal, a fusion between progressive rock and heavy metal originating in the mid-1980s
- Progressive country, originating in the 1970s
- Progressive house, originating in the early 1990s

== Other ==
- Progg, a Swedish political music movement originating in the late 1960s

== See also ==
- Prog (disambiguation)
- Progressive (disambiguation)
- Progressive jazz (disambiguation)
