= Ralf Hübner =

German jazz percussionist

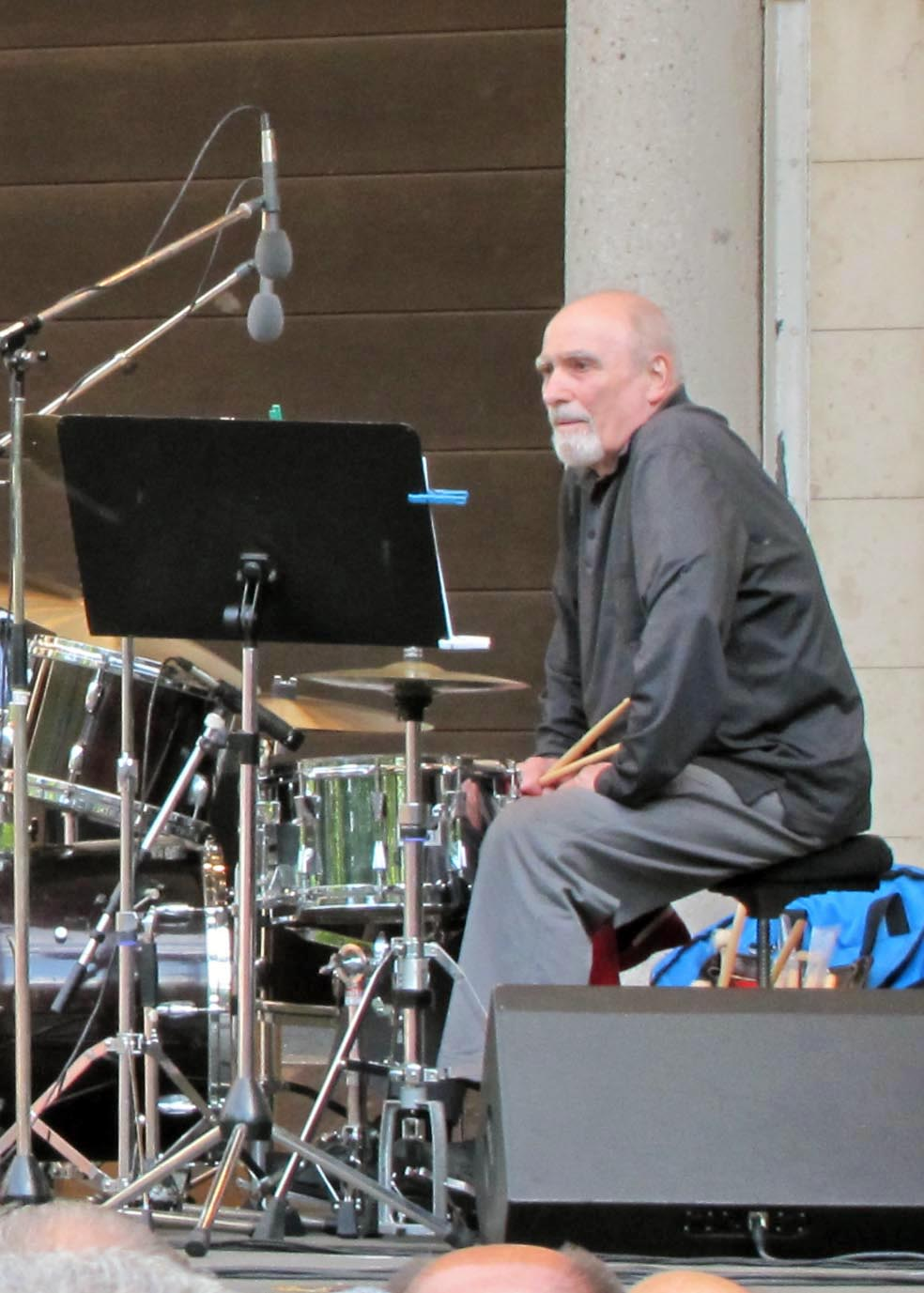
Ralf Hübner in 2011

Ralf Rainer Hübner (born May 3, 1939, Berlin) is a German jazz percussionist.

Hübner attended the Hochschule für Musik in Berlin (1958–1962), studying both double bass and drums there and playing with Benny Bailey and Nathan Davis. Upon graduating he joined the quintet of Albert Mangelsdorff, with whom he continued to perform and make recordings until 1971. At the same time, he was invited to join the Jazzensemble des Hessischen Rundfunks, also directed by Mangelsdorff and in which he would work up to 2010. As a member of the German All Stars he toured southern America and Japan.

In the 1970s he worked with Heinz Sauer, Günter Kronberg, and Bob Degen in the collaborative quintet Voices (Rediscover the Beautiful 1977); he also was a member of the quintet of Manfred Schoof (1976–9). In 1978 he recorded in a trio with Michel Pilz and Itaru Oki and with Volker Kriegel.

In the 1980s and 1990s, Hübner recorded with his quartet (Courage for the Past 1983; Perlboot 1987) and co-led a duo and a quartet with Christof Lauer (Moabiter Blues 1991, Mondspinner 1996).
