= Clarinet Contrast =

Musical ensemble

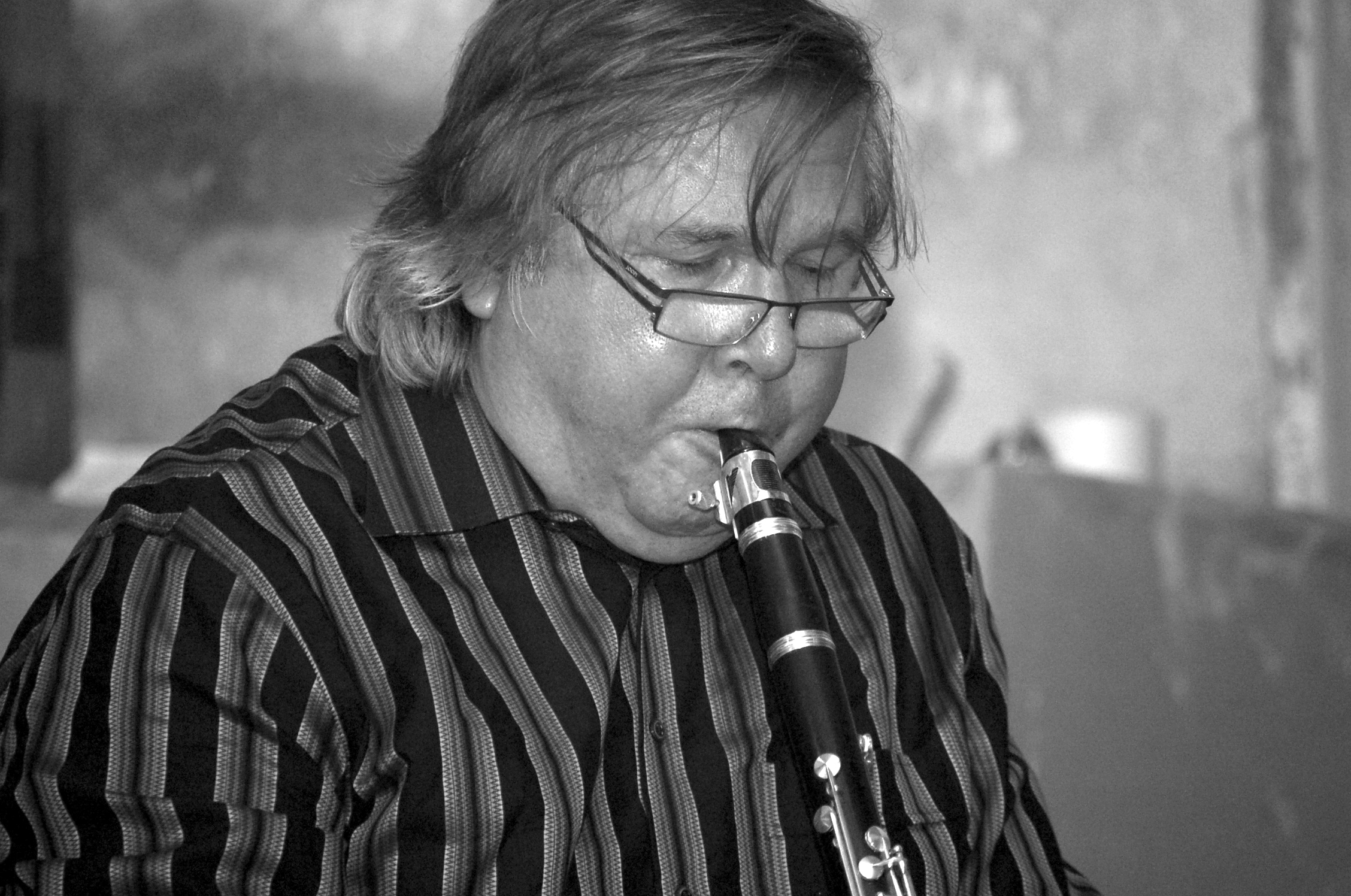
Theo Jörgensmann in Jülchendorf, Germany 2009

Clarinet Contrast was a clarinet ensemble with rhythm group led by clarinetist Theo Jörgensmann.

The group, which included members from four countries, existed from 1975 to 1977 and had awakened the interest in the contemporary jazzscene for the clarinet and was also one of the participants in the clarinet Renaissance in jazz and improvised music scene.

The band members were the clarinetists Theo Jörgensmann, Bernd Konrad, Perry Robinson, Hans Kumpf, Michel Pilz so as Günter Lenz, bass and Peter Giger, drums. Occasionally the clarinetists Gunter Hampel and Willem Breuker performed with Clarinet Contrast.

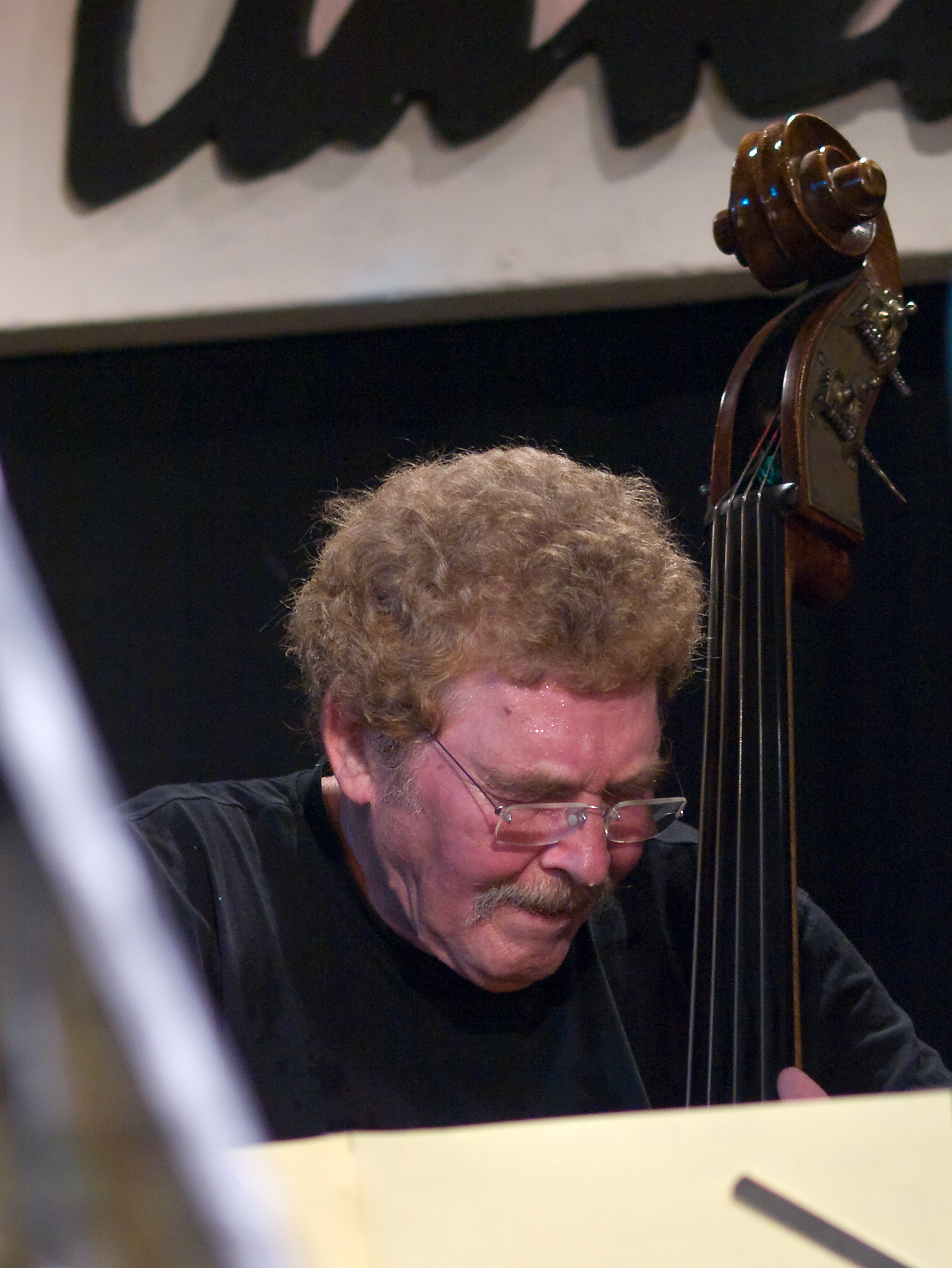
Günter Lenz former member of Clarinet Contrast at Jazzclub Unterfahrt (Munich 2009)
