= Jazz Ost-West =

Jazz Ost-West was an international jazz festival in Germany, one of the oldest jazz festivals in Europe, founded in Nuremberg in 1966. By 1970 it was attracting over 10,000 people annually.

During the Cold War, the festival was first used as a meeting point between jazz musicians from the West and the Eastern Bloc, attracting numerous groups from the former Soviet Republic and Czechoslovakia. For a long time it was an opportunity for a German audience to learn about the latest developments not only in the U.S. but also in different parts of Europe and the former Soviet Union. In the 1990s however, the festival lost its importance with the end of the Cold War, and the last festival was performed in 2002.

Artists who performed at the festival include Aziza Mustafa Zadeh, Albert Mangelsdorff, Attila Zoller, Rolf Kühn, Klaus Doldinger, Zbigniew Namysłowski, Peter Herbolzheimer, Barbara Dennerlein, Dusko Goykovich and Kurt Edelhagen, Tomasz Stańko, Peter Brötzmann, Art Blakey, Sun Ra, Pharoah Sanders, Herbie Mann, Phil Woods, Archie Shepp, Abdullah Ibrahim, Keith Jarrett, Karin Krog, Cecil Taylor, Paul Motian, Egberto Gismonti, Adam Makowicz, Bobby McFerrin, German Clarinet Duo, Eddie Lockjaw Davis, McCoy Tyner, Charlie Mariano, Jasper van't Hof, Abbey Lincoln, Michel Petrucciani, John McLaughlin, Bill Frisell, Lou Donaldson, Milt Jackson, Trilok Gurtu, Jiří Stivín, Yōsuke Yamashita, Dewey Redman, Carla Bley, and Terje Rypdal.
