= Konnex Records =

German jazz record label

- Founded: 1984
- Founder: Manfred Schiek
- Genre: Jazz, pop, rock
- Country of origin: Germany
- Location: Berlin

Konnex Records is a German jazz record label founded in 1984. Record producer Manfred Schiek, who had previously run the label Vinyl Records, founded the label in Berlin to issue contemporary jazz recordings from British and continental European performers. In the 1990s the label expanded into reissues of music by Elvin Jones and Cecil Taylor. Konnex operates a sublabel, Atonal, for electronic music.

== Roster ==
- Antonis Anissegos
- Borah Bergman
- Toto Blanke
- John Blum
- Thomas Borgmann
- Joanne Brackeen
- Anthony Braxton
- Rob van den Broek
- Peter Brötzmann
- Christy Doran
- Lajos Dudas
- Gerd Dudek
- Kim Efert
- European Jazz Ensemble
- Alvin Fielder
- Joe Fonda
- Sonny Fortune
- Joel Futterman
- Dennis Gonzalez
- Dick Griffin
- Ali Haurand
- Allan Holdsworth
- Carl Ludwig Huebsch
- Ken Hyder
- Theo Joergensmann
- Elvin Jones
- Kidd Jordan
- Achim Kaufmann
- Franklin Kiermyer
- Klaus Lenz
- Holger Mantey
- Charlie Mariano
- Henriette Mueller
- Zbigniew Namyslowski
- Pascal Niggenkemper
- Tony Oxley
- Jon Rose
- Ingrid Sertso
- Christoph Spendel
- John Stevens
- Jiri Stivin
- Cecil Taylor
- Keith Tippett
- David Tudor
- Felix Wahnschaffe
- Trevor Watts
- Art Zoyd
