= Clarinet Summit =

Clarinet Summit was a project organized by producer Joachim-Ernst Berendt in 1979.

A 1979 concert was released on MPS Records as You Better Fly Away. It features John Carter, Perry Robinson, Gianluigi Trovesi, Bernd Konrad, Theo Jörgensmann, Ernst-Ludwig Petrowsky, Didier Lockwood, Stan Tracey, Eje Thelin, Kai Kanthak, Jean-François Jenny-Clark, Günter Sommer, Aldo Romano.

Later, John Carter founded a group called Clarinet Summit. A 1981 concert, released on vinyl in two volumes as In Concert at the Public Theater (both on India Navigation), was reissued in 1991 on a single CD with the same title. It features Carter, Alvin Batiste, David Murray, Jimmy Hamilton.

In 1987, Southern Bells was released on Black Saint, featuring the same quartet.

Beginning in 2015, some former members of the “Clarinet Summit 1979” group began working together again using the name Clarinet Summit. The members of the group are Perry Robinson, Theo Jörgensmann, Gianluigi Trovesi, Bernd Konrad, Albrecht Maurer, Sebastian Gramss and Günter Sommer. In 2017, this formation released a live CD titled Clarinet Summit.

== Discography ==
- You Better Fly Away (MPS, 1979 [1980])
- In Concert at the Public Theater (India Navigation, 1981 [1984])
- In Concert at the Public Theater Volume II (India Navigation, 1981 [1985])
- Southern Bells (Black Saint, 1987)
- Clarinet Summit (Jazzwerkstatt, 2015–2016 [2017])
