= Contraband (big band) =

Dutch big band

Contraband is a progressive big band that formed in the 1980s led by trombonist Willem van Manen, recording exclusively for the BVHaast record label. The ensemble often combines free improvisation with swing. Band members include clarinetist Theo Jörgensmann and trombonist Chris Abelen, among others.

== Discography ==
- Live at the BIMhuis (1988, BVHaast)
- De Ruyter Suyte (1988, BVHaast)
- Hittit (1988, BVHaast)
- Pale Fire (1988, BVHaast)
