= Denis Colin =

French bass clarinettist and composer

Denis Colin is a French bass clarinettist and composer, born in Vanves, 24 July 1956.

After studying clarinet at the conservatoire in Versailles, he turned to jazz, making appearances with Steve Lacy, François Cotinaud and Alan Silva.

He was in charge of the IACP (Institute for Artistic and Cultural Perception) from 1979 to 1982 and taught jazz at the Montreuil sous bois conservatoire.

Among the musicians he has played with are: Celestrial Communication Orchestra, Texture (with saxophonist François Cotinaud), Bekummernis (led by Luc Le Masne), François Tusques and Archie Shepp.

He has written music for the theatre (for the Cie Tuchenn) and cinema (for Florence Miailhe). In 1991, he formed a trio with Didier Petit (cello) and Pablo Cueco (zarb) to explore world music and free jazz. The trio expanded in 1995, adding Bruno Girard or Régis Huby (violin) and Camel Zekri (guitar) to form the group Les Arpenteurs.

In 2000, Denis Colin was commissioned by Radio France to create "Dans les cordes", a piece for ten musicians. In 2001, the trio reconstituted itself again around Afro-American music, with musicians from the Minneapolis scene, for the album Something in Common. This adventure continued in 2005 with singer Gwen Matthews, who was featured on a second American album.

Colin emerged again in 2008 with a younger, rotating ensemble, La Société des Arpenteurs.

The Chicago Reader has described him as a 'major artist'.

== Discography ==
- Portrait for a Small Woman, Celestrial Communication Orchestra, with Alan Silva 1978, Desert Mirage, 1982
- Texture sextet 1981, Polygames, with Itaru Oki, François Cotinaud, Bruno Girard, Pierre Jacquet, Michel Coffi 1983
- Clarinette basse Seul, 1990
- Trois, 1992
- In situ à Banlieues Bleues, 1994
- Fluide, 1997
- European Echoes with Barre Phillips, Bobo Stenson, Kent Carter, Theo Jörgensmann, Wolter Wierbos, Benoit Delbecq etc., 1999
- Étude de terrain, 1999
- Something in Common, 2001
- Song for Swans, 2005
- Subject to Change, 2009
- Subject to Live, 2011
