= Leszek Żądło =

Polish jazz musician (born 1945)

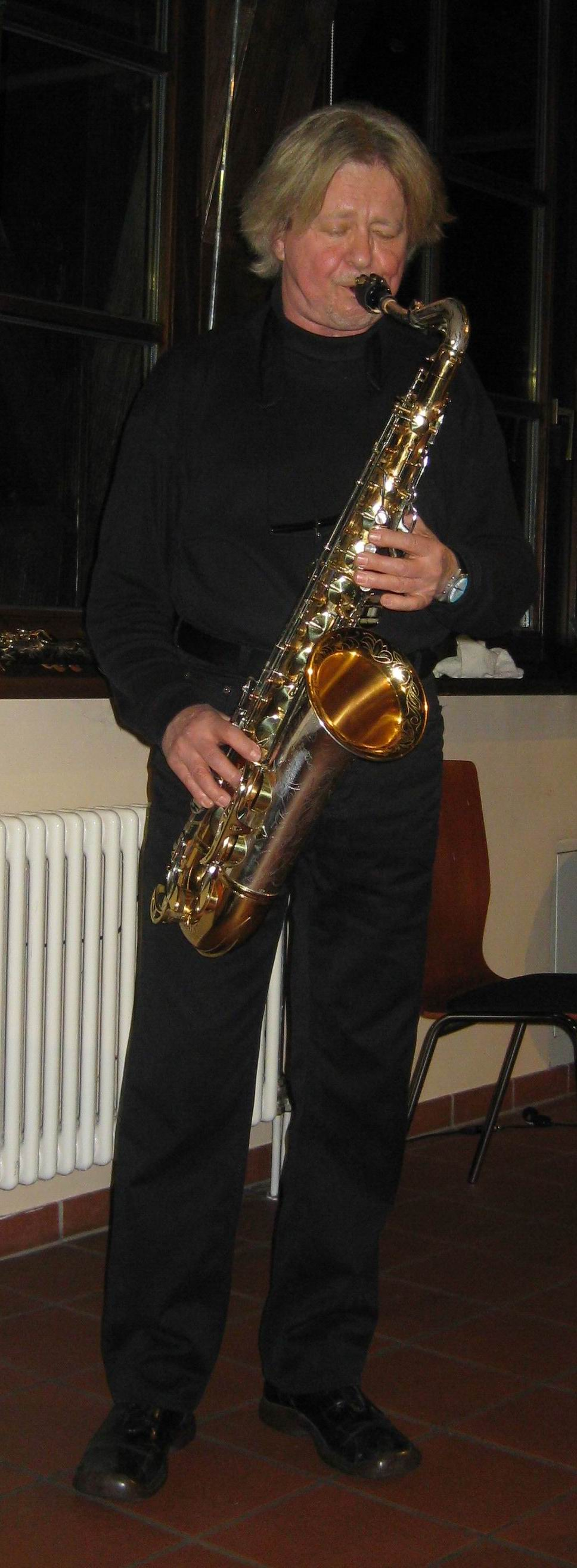
Żądło, 2009 in Kraków tower in Nuremberg

Leszek Żądło (Polish: Leszek Żądło; born 4 April 1945) is a Polish jazz musician (soprano saxophone, tenor saxophone, flute), composer, and university teacher.

== Life and work ==
Żądło was born in Kraków, Poland. He studied music in Kraków, Vienna, and Graz. In the mid-1960s, after he had already worked as a jazz musician in Kraków, he moved to Vienna, where he founded the International Quartet. At the end of the 1960s he joined the Group, a group of improvisational performers at the Musikhochschule Graz, where he taught Swedish trombonist Eje Thelin.

From the early to mid-1970s Żądło was a member of both the ORF big band and the Erich Kleinschuster sextet. He also appeared in productions alongside Dexter Gordon, Friedrich Gulda, Dusko Goykovich, and Michał Urbaniak. As part of the Leszek Żądło Ensemble, he played with trumpeter Johannes Faber and pianist Bob Degen. (The ensemble currently includes Bill Elgart and Paulo Cardoso.) Żądło also played in Ali Haurand's European Jazz Quintet, along with his fellow saxophonists Alan Skidmore and Gerd Dudek.

In 1983 Żądło founded the Polski Jazz Ensemble with Vladislav Sendecki, Bronisław Suchanek, and Janusz Stefański. Jazz & Lyrik Productions The Waltz end of the world (1985) was also involved in the ensemble. Żądło repeatedly played in churches on productions of Südwestfunk with organist Claus Bantzer. These productions were produced by Joachim-Ernst Berendt.

Żądło has also worked with Klaus Weiss, Volker Kriegel, Bobby Star, Rimona Francis, Günter Lenz, Michael Naura, Werner Pirchner, Chris Beier, Rainer Glas, and Biréli Lagrène. As a guest soloist, he has been involved in numerous big-band productions, such as Experimenti Berlin with Thad Jones, Slide Hampton, and Martin Schrack. He has also helped form Norddeutscher Rundfunk, Westdeutscher Rundfunk and the RIAS.

Żądło has taught at the University of Music Würzburg since 1986 and was appointed professor in 2003. In addition, he composed film music. In 1985, he contributed to the film Men..., by Doris Dörrie. His playing style is distinguished by melancholic sounding lyricism, in spite of the harmonic and linear freedom of a post-John Coltrane saxophonist.

== Discography ==
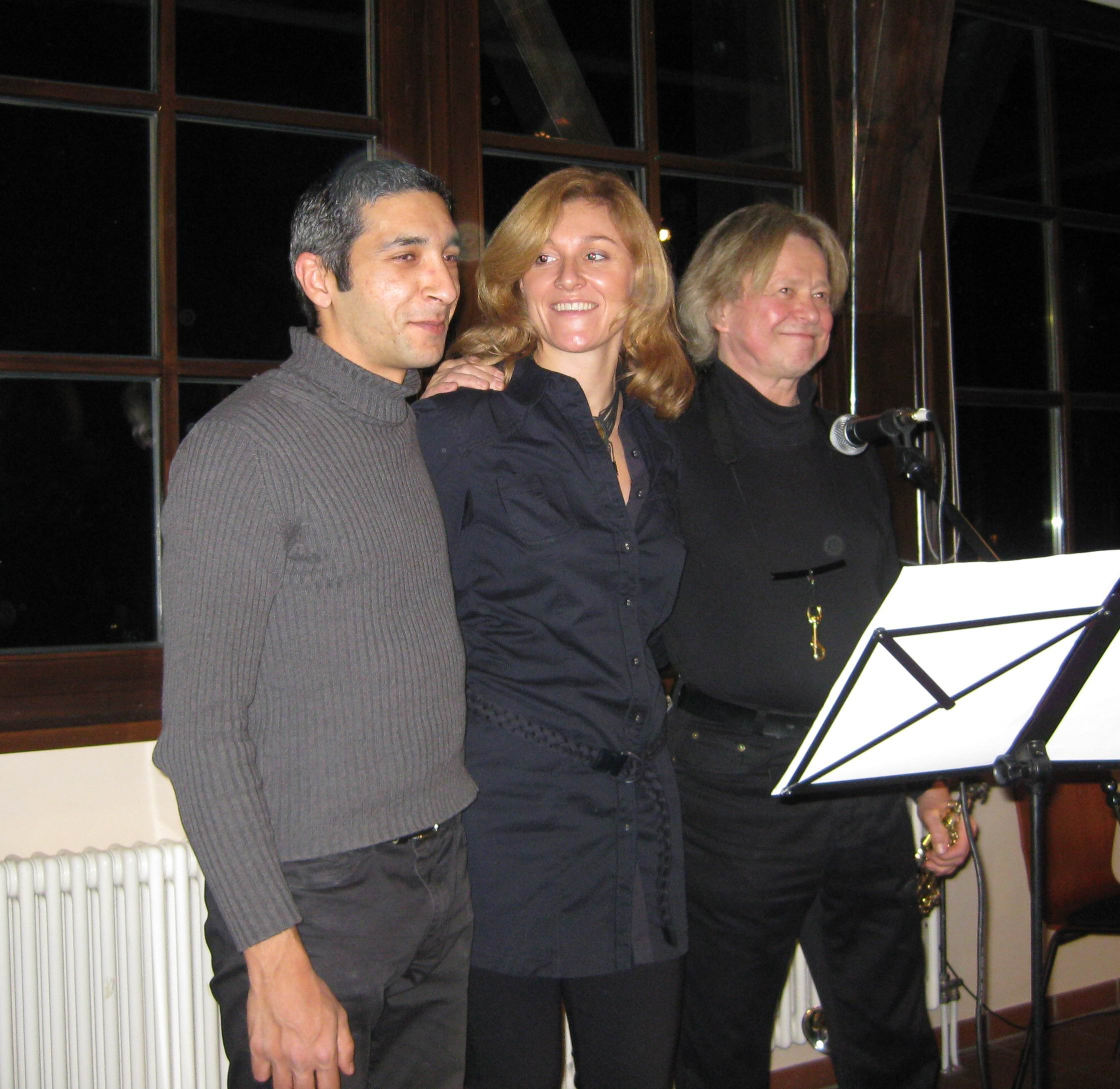
Konstantin Kostov, Agnieszka Hekiert and Leszek Żądło

- 1973: Inner Silence, the Leszek Żądło Ensemble, with Butch Kellem, Dick Sells, Gerhard Herrmann, and Peter Ponger
- 1976: Thoughts, Leszek Żądło, with Joe Haider, Isla Eckinger, and Joe Nay
- 1977: Time Emit, Leszek Żądło, with Johannes Faber, Bob Degen, Gary Todd, and Joe Nay
- 1980: Sting, Leszek Żądło, with Bob Degen, Günter Lenz, and Joe Nay)
- 1984: As Time Went by, Overtone featuring Leszek Żądło, with Chris Beier, Rainer Glass, and Rudolf Roth
- 1987: Tour de France, the Leszek Żądło Ensemble, with Chris Beier, Rainer Glass, and Jurek Bezucha
- 1989: Breath, the Leszek Żądło Ensemble, with Chris Beier, Rainer Glass, and Bill Elgart
- 1990: Springtime in Winter, Leszek Żądło, Harold Rubin, and Pharpar
- 1994: Space, Rainer Glass, Chris Beier, and Leszek Żądło
- 1995: Illumination: Improvisations for Saxophone and Organ, Leszek Żądło and Claus Bantzer
- 2006: The Jazz Age Ensemble with Rainer Glass, Bernhard Pichl, Harald Rüschenbaum, Torsten Goods, and Andrei Lobanov
- 2010: Universal: The Rainbow Suite, the Rainer Glass Ensemble, with Johannes Faber, Jörg Widmoser, Peter O'Mara Jan Miserre, Carola Grey, Biboul Darouiche, and Peter Knoll

== Bibliography ==
- Wolf Kampmann: Reclams Jazzlexikon, Stuttgart 2003, ISBN 3-15-010528-5
