= Itaru Oki =

Japanese jazz musician (1941–2020)

Itaru Oki (沖 至, Oki Itaru; September 10, 1941 – August 25, 2020) was a Japanese jazz trumpeter and flugelhornist.

== Early life and education ==
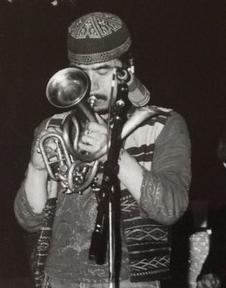
Itaru Oki

Oki was born in Kobe. He began studying koto as a child, under instruction from his mother, who was a professional kotoist. He took up trumpet from 1955 and played in high school bands, then enrolled at Osaka Industrial University, where he majored in architecture and concurrently played in Dixieland jazz ensembles.

== Career ==
Early in his career, Oki studied under Fumio Nanri, Kenny Dorham, and Sadao Watanabe, and in the 1960s and 1970s played with Nobusuke Miyamoto, Yoku Tamura, Kosuke Mine, and Akio Nishimura. In 1966, he was a cofounder of ESSG, along with Masahiko Sato, Mototeru Takagi, and Masahiko Togashi.

In 1974, Oki relocated to Paris, where he taught in I.A.C.P. (Jazz school), and where he played with Japanese expat Takashi Kako and played across Europe with Art Farmer, Maynard Ferguson, Noah Howard, Lee Konitz, Steve Lacy, Michel Pilz, François Cotinaud, and Sam Rivers.

In 1992 he became a member of the World Residents ensemble. He started to work since 2015, in Paris with pianist François Tusques, accordion player Claude Parle & Isabel Juan Pera singer.

The French label "Improvising Beings" has edited a CD: "Le chant du Jubjub" It's a reference to Lewis Carroll. Écouter Tchangodeï itaru oki, Kent carter trio: jeux d’ombres, perfect emptiness, jazz à vienne
