= Contact Trio =

German jazz group

- Origin: Ruhr, Germany
- Genres: Jazz, jazz-rock, jazz fusion, free improvisation, free jazz, progressive rock, avant-prog, krautrock, experimental, avant-garde
- Years active: 1970–1984
- Labels: Blackfield, Calig, JAPO
- Past members: Theo Jörgensmann; Alois Kott; Michael Jüllich; Evert Brettschneider; Peter Eisold

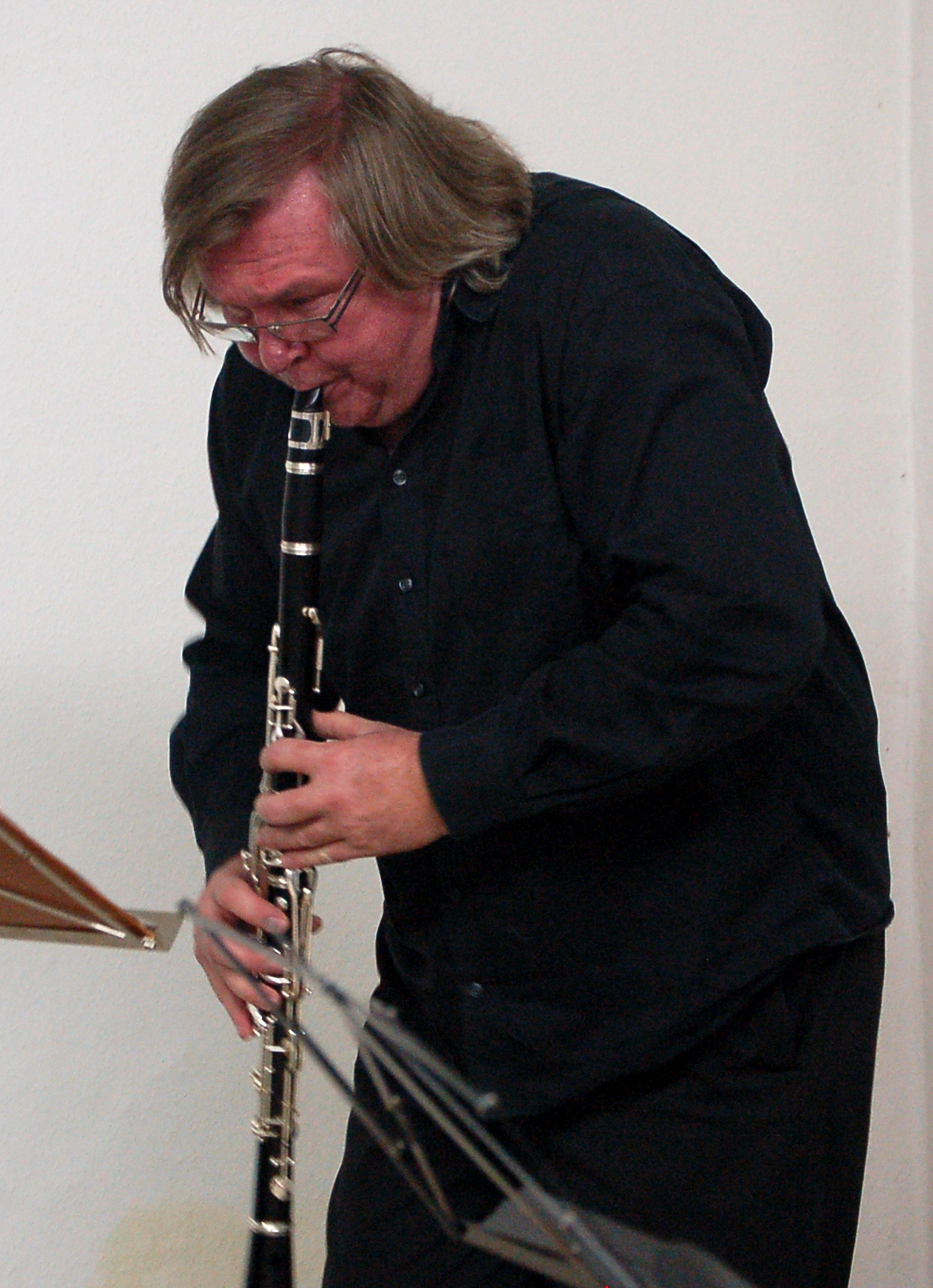
Theo Jörgensmann, 2009

Contact Trio was a jazz group from the Ruhr area of Germany that existed from 1970 to 1984. The band was one of the first professional jazz groups in the Ruhr area and released four albums. The founding members of the group included clarinetist Theo Jörgensmann, bassist Alois Kott, and drummer Michael Jüllich.

== Career ==
The trio performed primarily in Germany and Switzerland. Jörgensmann played from 1970 to 1973 with the trio. When he left, guitarist Evert Brettschneider joined the group. In the early 1980s, Michael Jüllich left the band. He was replaced by drummer Peter Eisold. The Contact Trio performed at the Deutsches Jazzfestival in 1974 and the Berlin Jazz Festival in 1981.

Since 2015 there is a new edition of the band as Contact 4tett, which includes the former soloists of the band Theo Jörgensmann and Evert Brettschneider. The other members are Kai Kanthak, electric bass and Bernd Oezsevim, drums. vor Michael Jüllich war Michael Radünz Drummer der Band.

== Discography ==
- Contact (Blackfield, 1972)
- Double Face (Calig, 1975)
- New Marks (Japo, 1978)
- Musik (Japo, 1981)
