= German Clarinet Duo =

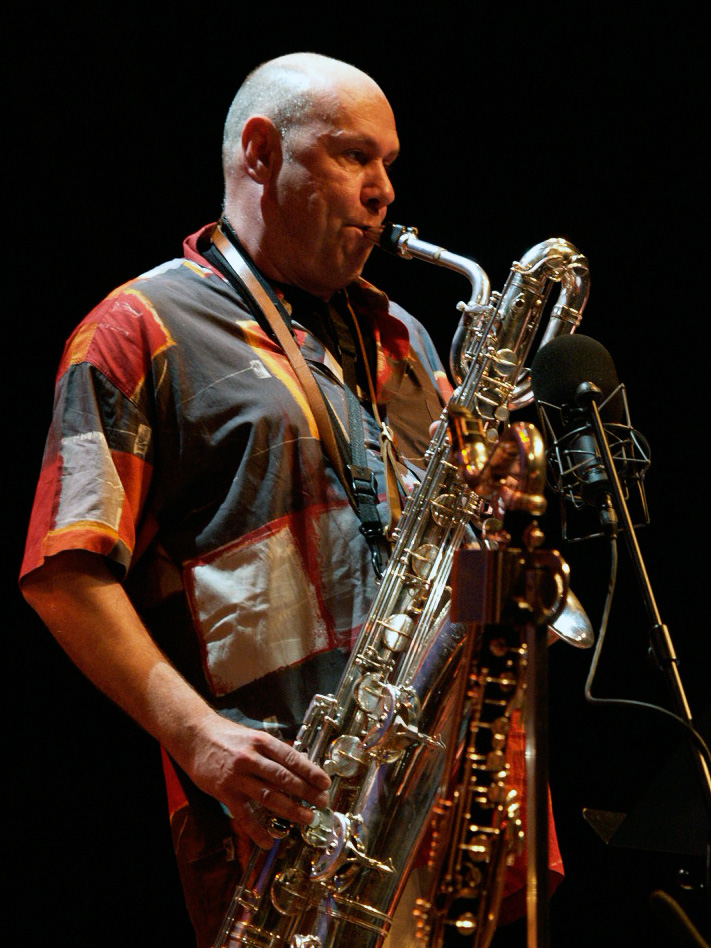
Eckard Koltermann at Moers festival, 2007

German Clarinet Duo was a German jazz clarinet duo with Theo Jörgensmann, clarinet and Eckard Koltermann, bass clarinet. The duo formed in 1984 and existed until 1998. The duo explores the synthesis of composition and improvisation.

== Collaborations ==
German Clarinet Duo have collaborated with several other artists, including Karoly Binder, Maria de Alvear, Willem van Manen's Contraband or with Kenny Wheeler and Orkest de Volharding from Netherlands.

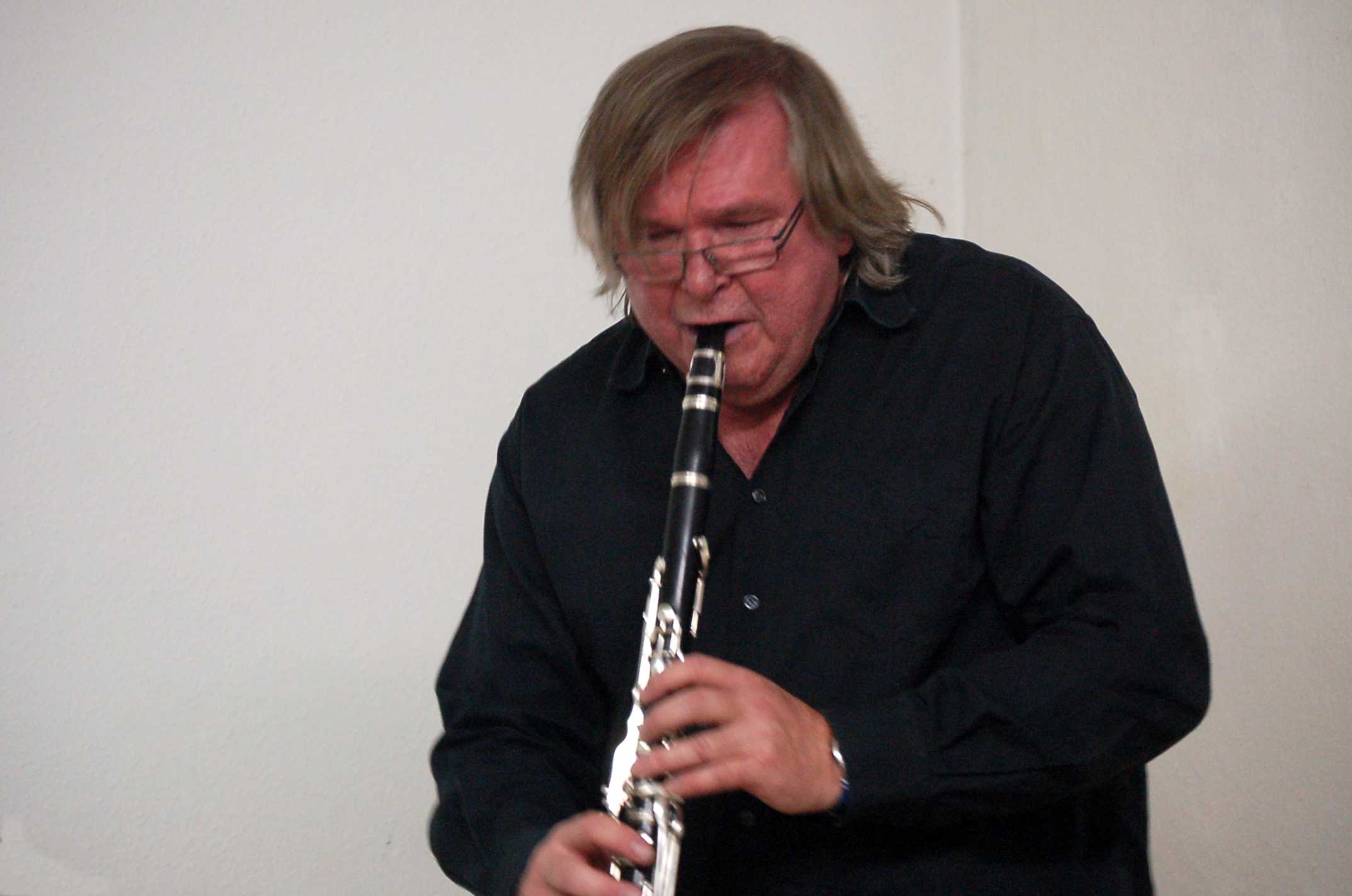
Theo Jörgensmann, 2009.

== Discography ==
- Schwarzlicht released 1988
- Materialized Perception with Perry Robinson released 1992
- Hommage a Jimmy Giuffre released 1994
- T. Jörgensmann/E. Koltermann Pagine Gialle, recorded 1995; released 2001 (Hathut Records)
