= Prog =

Prog may refer to:

== Music ==
- Progressive music
  - Progressive music (disambiguation)
  - Progressive rock, a subgenre of rock music also known as "prog"
    - Progressive rock (radio format)
    - Progressive metal, a subgenre of progressive rock and heavy metal music
- Prog (magazine), a magazine dedicated to progressive rock
- Prog (album), a 2007 album by jazz trio The Bad Plus

== Computing ==
- A computer program
- Computer programming

== Fiction ==
- An issue of the British comics anthology 2000 AD (comics)
- Neftin and Vendra Prog, fictional characters from the Ratchet & Clank series

== Other ==
- Guatemalan Revolutionary Workers Party (Spanish: Partido Revolucionario Obrero Guatemalteco)
- A prognostic chart
- Progesterone, a sex hormone

== See also ==
- Progg, a Swedish political music movement
- Markus Prock, an Austrian luger and Olympic medalist
- Prague, the capital and largest city of the Czech Republic
