= Heinz Sauer =

German saxophonist (born 1932)

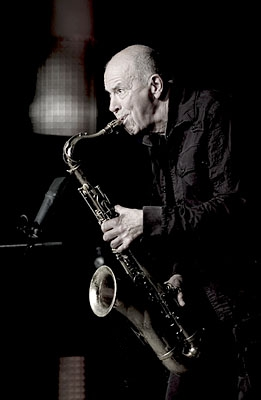
- Heinz Sauer (2008)

Background information
- Born: December 25, 1932; Merseburg, Germany
- Genres: Jazz
- Occupation: Musician
- Instrument: Saxophone

Heinz Sauer (born December 25, 1932, Merseburg) is a German jazz saxophonist.

Sauer was an autodidact on tenor saxophone and began his career playing locally around Frankfurt in the 1950s. He played for many years in Albert Mangelsdorff's ensemble, as well as the Jazzensemble des Hessischen Rundfunks and the German All Stars. He worked often with Bob Degen, and has also performed or recorded with musicians such as Ralf Hübner, Günter Lenz, Stefan Schmolck, and Manfred Schoof. In the 1990s he began experimenting with the use of electronic processing on his saxophones. In the 2000s among others he performed in a trio with Christopher Dell (vibraphones) and Bertram Ritter (percussion) and a duo with Michael Wollny. He received several prestigious German awards such as "Deutscher Jazzpreis" (1999), "SWR-Jazzpreis" (2008) and several times the "Deutscher Schallplattenpreis"("German Record Critics' Award").

== Discography ==
- Ellingtonia Revisited! (L+R, 1980)
- Blues After Sunrise (L+R, 1983)
- Melancholia (ACT, 2005)
- Certain Beauty (ACT, 2006)
- The Journey (ACT, 2008)
- If (Blue) Then (Blue) (ACT, 2010)
- Plaza Lost and Found (L+R, 2012)
- Don't Explain (ACT, 2012)
- Hamburg Episode (Art of Groove, 2015)
- Europaischer Jazz 2016 (Infraserv Hochst, 2016)
