= François Cotinaud =

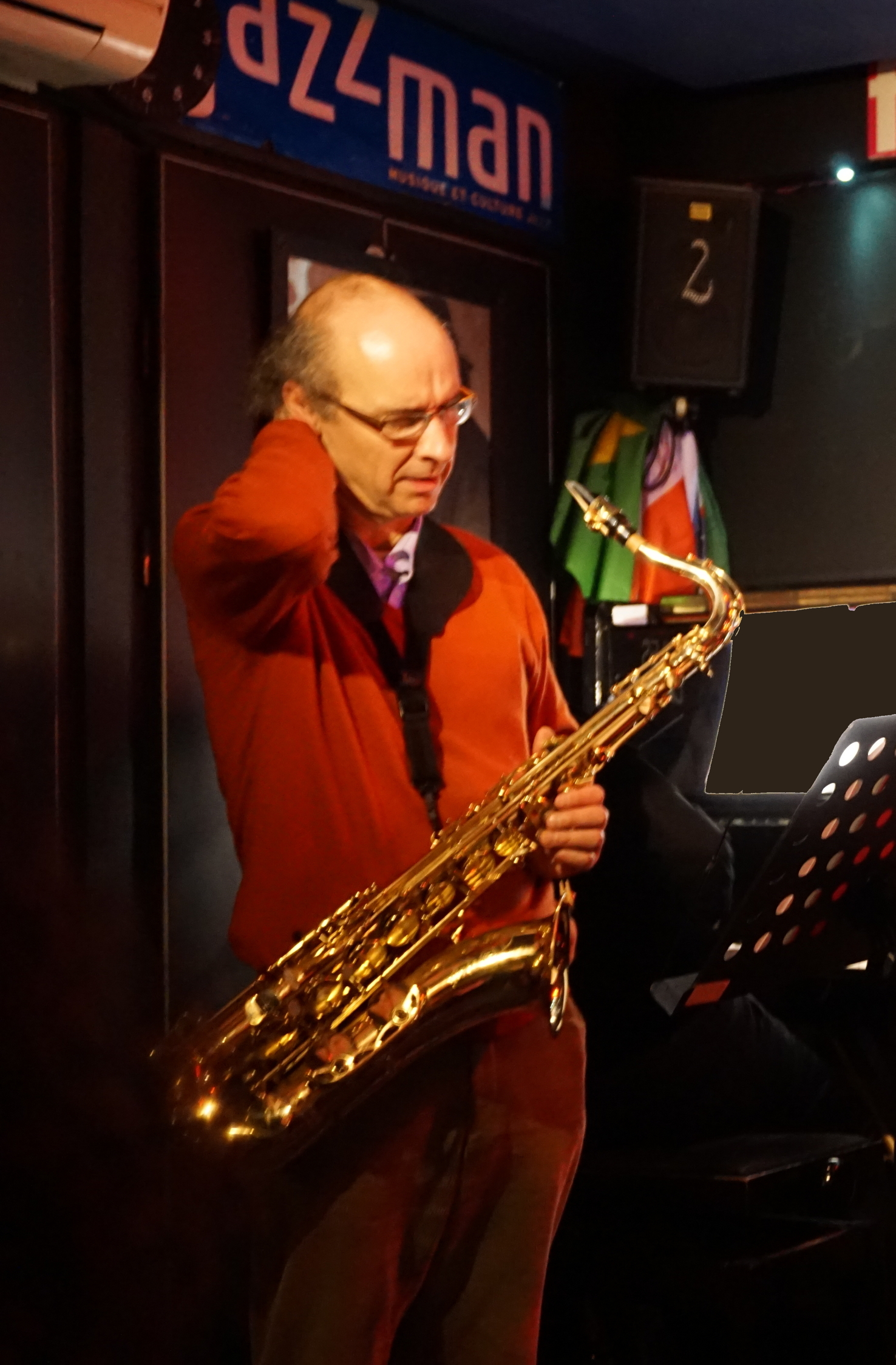
- François Cotinaud, 2015.

Background information
- Born: 9 August 1956 (age 70); Casablanca, Morocco
- Genre: Jazz
- Occupations: Composer, musician, soundpainter
- Instruments: Tenor saxophone, clarinet
- Years active: 1976–present
- Labels: Musivi, Ayler Records
- Website: www.jazzbank.com

François Cotinaud (born 9 August 1956) is a French composer, saxophonist, clarinetist, and soundpainter.

== Biography ==
François Cotinaud studied music with Alan Silva, Cecil Taylor, George Russell, Kenny Wheeler, and Steve Lacy. He then created the label Musivi, recorded several albums and led various experiences with Denis Colin (Texture), Bobby Few, Ramón López, Glenn Ferris, Enrico Rava, Pascale Labbé, and Serge Adam.

In 1985, he created a quartet with Ramón López, Heriberto Paredes, Thierry Colson, and later with Gilles Coronado. His solo CD Loco Solo (1998) about Luciano Berio displays his trend for contemporary music and provocation. He performed with percussionist, Pierre Charpy (electro-acoustics device) around Arthur Rimbaud's texts ("Rimbaud and M.A.O.").

After a stint in the Tierra del Fuego group led by Pablo Nemirovsky, he showed in "Yo M'enamori" its Mediterranean sensibility through the prism of a contemporary re-reading, free of tradition, with pianist Sylvie Cohen.

He stands apart from other jazz musicians of his generation in his formal research between text (poetry) and music (improvised or written) in various formations, such as the duet with cellist Deborah Walker ("Poetica Vivace"), the ensemble Text'up (texts by Raymond Queneau and Arthur Rimbaud), and the ensemble Luxus (Pascale Labbé, vocals/Jérôme Lefebvre, guitar) with Rainer Maria Rilke.

He played with the Spoumj (Soundpainting Orchestra of the Union of Jazz Musicians, directed by François Jeanneau), and founded the group Algèbre with Pierre Durand (guitar) and Daniel Beaussier (winds). Involved in Soundpainting, a composition language created by Walter Thompson, he founded the ensemble Klangfarben in 2010 (dance, music and actors), which records and does performances dedicated to Arnold Schoenberg and John Cage at museums and theaters.

He organized and produced the two first Soundpainting Festivals in Paris (2013–2014), with 101 artists, major Soundpainting formations like: Spoumj, Klanfarben, Amalgammes, TSO, the Spang, Walter Thompson Orchestra, Batik, Helsinki Soundpainting Ensemble.

He recorded pieces based on an open form, in the spirit of Earle Brown, melding written contemporary music and Soundpainting, with a Multilateral ensemble (contemporary ensemble) and the composer Benjamin de la Fuente.

== Composer ==
From the age of eight, Cotinaud would write the melodies and musical phrases he invented in a notebook. Since 1975, Cotinaud continued this work by writing hundreds of themes for the groups he belongs to, both for pedagogy and professional purposes. From 1989, it began to converge around more elaborate constructions, creating precise universes, and already around the poetic work of Victor Hugo, Raymond Queneau, Arthur Rimbaud, Rainer Maria Rilke, Dante Alighieri, a research project extending until 2017 with the ensemble Luxus. In 2007, his compositions for clarinet and cello with Deborah Walker (Dedalus ensemble) turned towards a more contemporary, chiseled writing. He began a series of studies for clarinet, which only had a name since the architecture and articulation with the Lydian system of George Russell and the melodic virtuosity make it a concert experience. He received a commission for a cappella mixed choir from the festival Les Voix des Cairns (Quiberon, France), and founded his own publishing company in 2021, Poetica Vivace Editions.. 2024-2025 was created his first works for strings (Tikkun Olam, in extremis,la perte de l'être cher, pluie-chemin).

== Pedagogy ==
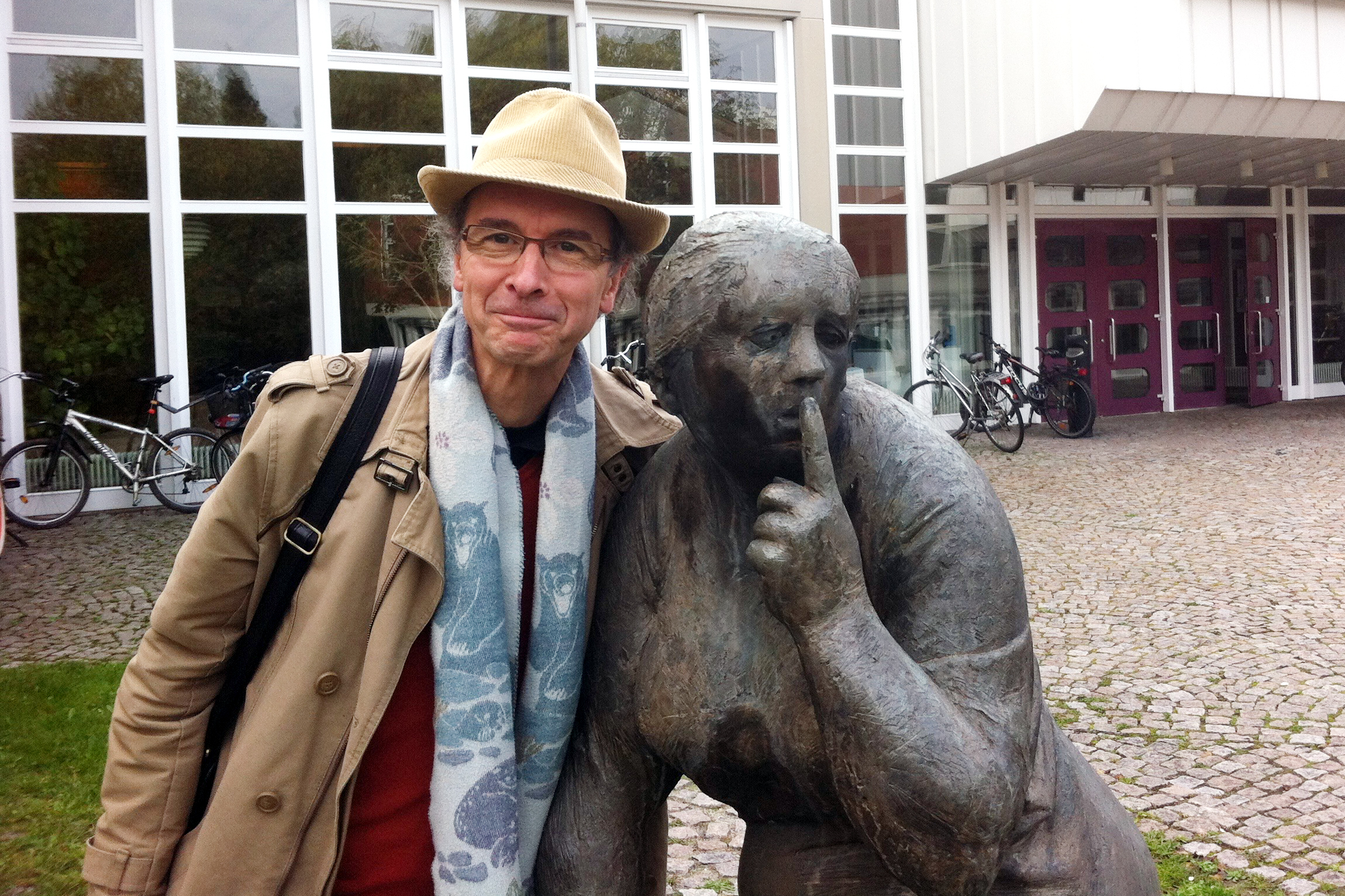
François Cotinaud at Freiburg Musikhochschule – 2015

Cofounder with A. Silva, then director of an improvisation music school in Paris from 1977 to 1987 (I.A.C.P.), François Cotinaud taught musical improvisation not only as an idiomatic jazz language, but also in a much freer environment, and has led collective improvisation courses since 1978. He teaches Soundpainting in Paris (Mozart conservatory), with his first official class, other workshops in Finland, and in many towns in France. He has contributed to the international think tanks of soundpainters (in Bordeaux, London, Barcelona, Paris, Milano, Valencia, Madrid, Santiago de Compostela).

== Compositions ==
Pieces for clarinet: Oreille-Caresse, Jadis-Plume, Puit-Lumière, Eclat-Noir, Cristal-Feuille, Epi-Tambour, Singe-Lune, Bleu-Orange, Phénix ( Lydian progressive studies volumes 1, 2 and 3) commissioned by Poetica Vivace Publishing, 2019–2020

Pieces for saxophone: Inventaire, Mode à la joie, Boire, Oribe, Obéir (around Sequenza IX by Luciano Berio) 1998

Pieces for various duos: La perte, Poetica Vivace, Dialogue, Hypothesis, Temps perdu (cello-clarinet) 2007–2008 Pluie-Chemin (flute-clarinet) 2019 – 2'40" Ombre-Jardin (piece for clarinet and bass-clarinet) 2020 – 2'25"

Pieces for voice, harp and clarinet/tenor saxophone: J'ai rarement vu, Des goûts et des couleurs, Pauvre Jean, Toujours dans la chaussure?, 2009

Pieces for voice, clarinet/tenor saxophone and electric guitar: Crier le Hasard, Prodige, Éternité, Verwandlung, La Bête, spiegele Malerei (around the sonnets to Orpheus of Rainer Maria Rilke), commissioned by label Musivi, 2015 – 30'

Pieces for various trios Who Speaks ?, Pergola for saxophone, guitar and bass (2026).

Pieces for stringquartet Tikkun Olam for string quartet, 2024 – 19'02"; La Perte de l'être cher for string quartet – 2025 – 3'02"

Other pieces for quartet Tikkun Olam for saxophone quartet, 2024 – 19'02"; Parade des Hottentots for saxophone quartet, 2024 – 05'53"

Small jazz ensembles: Le Crotoy (1983), Casa del sol, Acrobaties, Dix-huit carats, Princesse, Temakatamawo, (1989), Métakynesis (1990), Ficus, Voix interdites, Pyramides, Circus (1992), Jeux de mains (1994) Algorithme, Topologie d'un manège, Diagramme, Hologram, Le pendule du Fou, Monoïd, I Would like to be Free, Mes filles commissioned by label Musivi, 2013 – 58'39", Strange Big Sockets for Accordion, Contralto clarinet and percussions, commissioned by Cie Les Musiques à Ouïr, 2022 – 7'50"

Big jazz ensemble: Chasse-mouche (1983), Ilperel, Indigo, Tishri (1998), Terre libre commissioned by Orchestre de Jazz Départemental – Seine Saint-Denis 2004 No it is open on one position commissioned by Orchestre de Jazz Départemental – Seine Saint-Denis 2005 World premiere Mue du Monde for 72 children choir and jazz ensemble, on the composer's poetry, commissioned by DRAC Champagne-Ardenne 2006 Et le diable a tremblé..., Listes en vrac commissioned by département de la Seine Saint-Denis, 2014 Like et Vous m'avez dit, sur un poème d'Emile Verhaeren commissioned by département de la Seine Saint-Denis, 2018

Jazz ensembles and improvised music, with poetry: Le festin des ogres, Jambe de Dieu, Danse avec les fous (pieces around Victor Hugo) 1995, Traversée de la page, Suppositions, Le calligraphe du vide (words by Franz Bartelt), la Sieste, Les Généreuses (words by Dominique Pagnier and François Rabelais), Épouvantails (words by André Velter) 1999 Déchiffrage, Modestie, Art Popo, Marine, Silence Coi, Rush, (words by Raymond Queneau), Text'up, Ydol Nabdous (words by the composer) commissioned by label Musivi 2002 Enfance, Parade, Voyelles, Being Beauteous, À la Musique, Rêvé pour l'hiver, The Bridges, Barbare, Démocratie (words by Arthur Rimbaud), commissioned by label Musivi 2005 Je vis, je meurs, written on the famous poetry of Louise Labé 2018 Sacacorchos 2024

Traditional arrangements or pieces: Mis amigos me dan esperanza, Judish-Spanish traditional arrangements 2000, Deki, El rey que tanto madruga 2004

Pieces for ensemble: Variations sur une collection de timbres 2010 Monologue de Schönberg, Palette Cage (Klangfarben ensemble) commissioned by label Musivi, 2012 Fleeting Patterns (2013) Onomatopée, Tadouda-ta, AcrabilA (Klangfarben ensemble) commissioned by ville de Chelles, 2016 Découper-colorier-coller, Cités abacules, Dons des pierres qui parlent, La fin de Pompei, L'usage des couleurs, Du nu dans les bleus, Clé de voûte, Aire de jeux acoustiques (ensemble Multilatérale) with Benjamin de la Fuente, commissioned by label Musivi; 2017 – 51' Ocre-vent (violin/clarinet/tuba/piano) 2'10, Vague-Lune (violin/clarinet/tuba/ piano) 2020 – 4'43

Pieces for a cappella choir: World premiere Orpheus : Un temple dans l'écoute, Elle était une enfant, Le pavot des morts, triptych for a capella mixed choir, commissioned by the DRAC Bretagne 2021 – 13'

Pieces for choir and piano: Exotica on the Charles Baudelaire's poetry : Parfum exotique 2'47"; Sommeil paradoxal on the Arthur Rimbaud's poetry : Le Dormeur du Val, 2021 – 4'24"; Omnis stultos insanire, 2024 – 6'07" (words of Cicéron); Se la mia morte brami (3'20"), O dolorosa gioia (3'20")(Carlo Gesualdo revisited); and Chants de la Divine Comédie in twelve pieces on words by Dante Alighieri : Cosí la menta mia (5'18"), Tu non se'in terra (2'38"), Qual si lamenta (2'39") Giudizio affrettato (4'38"), Questi per noi (3'40"), Come 'l ramarro (2'), Omai (4'36"), L'anima ch'era fiera divenuta (2'), Da l'Odio proprio son le cose tute (4'17"), Lí veggio d'ogne parte farsi presta (3'36"), il Ruscello e le Stelle (6'), Fatti non foste a viver come bruti (4') – commissioned by ensemble Solé-Temps 2025-2026.

Pieces for choir, soprano voice, symphonic orchestra: Tempus fugit, utere words by Isabelle Normand, commissioned by festival Les Musicales de Quiberon and Sacem, 2022 – 15' (Festival Les Musicales de Quiberon, Eglise Notre-Dame du Travail 2023/06/04)

== Discography ==
=== As leader or co-leader ===
- Portrait for a small woman, Celestrial Communication Orchestra, direction Alan Silva 1978
- Texture sextet 1981, with Itaru Oki, Bruno Girard, Denis Colin, Pierre Jacquet, Michel Coffi
- Desert Mirage, Celestrial Communication Orchestra, direction Alan Silva 1982
- Polygames, with Itaru Oki, Bruno Girard, Denis Colin, Pierre Jacquet, Michel Coffi 1983
- Princesse, featuring Heriberto Paredes, Thierry Colson, Ramón López, Label Musivi 1990
- Pyramides, featuring Heriberto Paredes, Thierry Colson, Ramón López, Glenn Ferris and Enrico Rava, Label Musivi 1992
- Opéra, 17 contemporary improvisations, with Ramón López, Label Musivi 1993
- Loco Solo, improvisations around Sequenza IX from Luciano Berio, Label Musivi 1998
- Yo M'enamori, 14 Jewish-Spanish songs, with pianist Sylvie Cohen, Label Musivi 2000
- François Cotinaud fait son Raymond Queneau, with Text'up ensemble, Label Musivi 2003
- Rimbaud et son double, (collectiv works, box of 2 CD + 1 DVD), with Pascale Labbé, Pierre Charpy, Mathilde Morières, Sylvain Lemêtre, François Choiselat, Jérôme Lefebvre, Olivier Guichard, Label Musivi 2006
- François Cotinaud, Klangfarben ensemble, Monologue de Schönberg and Variations sur une collection de timbres, box CD-DVD, Label Ayler Records/Musivi Soundpainting Collection, 2012
- No Meat Inside, with Henri Roger, Barre Phillips, Emmanuelle Somer, Label Facing You / IMR 2013
- François Cotinaud, Topologie d'un Manège, with Algèbre (Daniel Beaussier, Pierre Durand, Bruno Chevillon, Denis Charolles, François Merville), Label Musivi 2013 (Musea)
- Ensemble LUXUS (Pascale Labbé, François Cotinaud, Jérôme Lefebvre) L'Orphée de Rilke, Label Musivi 2016 (Musea)
- Mosaïques François Cotinaud and Benjamin de la Fuente, ensemble Multilatérale, Label Musivi, Soundpainting Collection, 2018
- Night Access François Cotinaud and Sergio Castrillon (cello), 17 pieces, 2018

=== As sideman ===
- Le Cercle de Pierres, with Bekummernis (Luc Le Masne, direction and compositions), Ménélas, 1986
- Calcuttango, with Tierra del Fuego (Pablo Nemirovsky, direction and compositions), Tangram, 1994
- Hommage à George Russell with Philippe Seignez, Label Musivi, 2018
- Naked Lunch, Pascal Bréchet 8tet, Sophia Domancich, Philippe Lemoine, Eric Groleau, Jean-Luc Ponthieux. Label Musivi 2023.
