= Lajos Dudas =

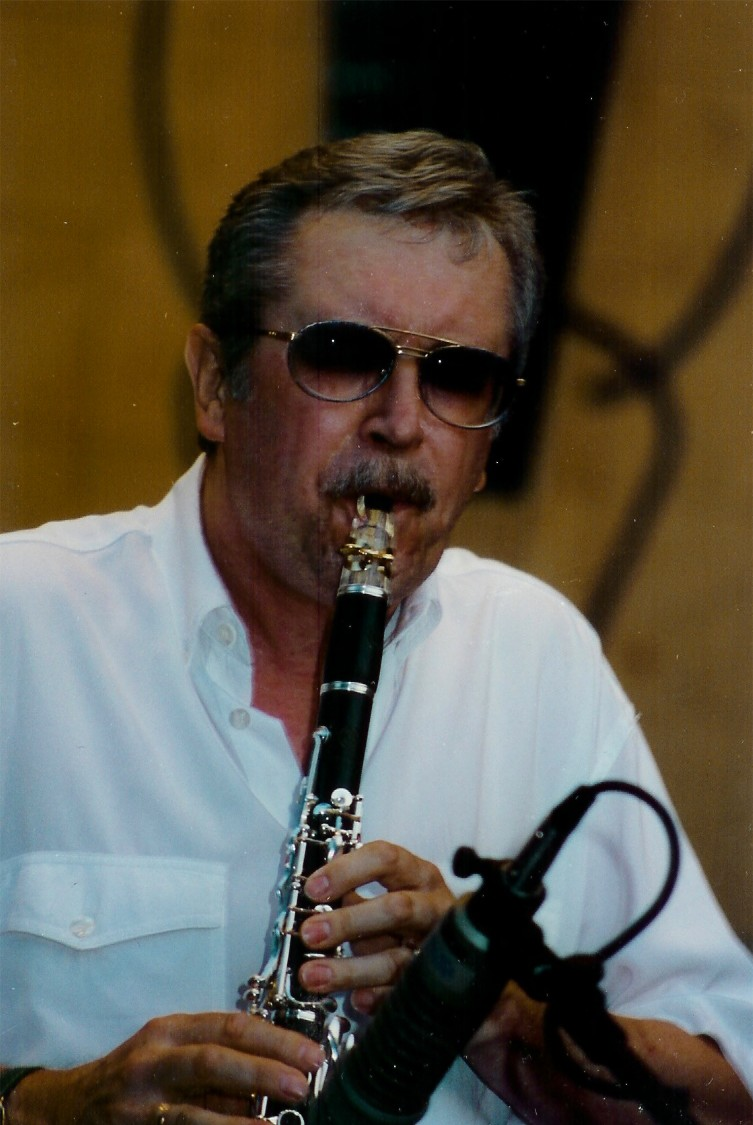
Lajos Dudas

Lajos Dudas (Hungarian: [ˈlɒjoʃ ˈdudɒʃ]; born February 18, 1941, in Budapest, Hungary) is a German-Hungarian jazz clarinetist and composer.

== Biography ==
Dudas studied at the Béla Bartók Conservatory and the Franz Liszt Academy of Music in Budapest.

He then appeared on concert tours throughout in Europe, not only as a jazz and rock musician but also as a soloist in works such as Carl Maria von Weber's Clarinet Quintet, Igor Stravinsky's Solo Pieces for Clarinet and Alexander Glazunov's Concerto for Alto Saxophone. He won international recognition, above all, with his successful composition 'Urban Blues' at the 11. International Jazz Competition in Monaco in 1982.

In the 1980s he was ranked high year after year in the 'Top People Poll' the famous International Jazz Forum. After his period as a freelance musician (1963–73) Dudas has been a lecturer (School of Music in Neuss/GER) and also taught from 1975 to 1985 at the Rheinland College of Education. In addition, since 1976, after a spell concentrating on classical music, he was worked with well-known musicians on recordings, radio productions and tours: they include Karl Berger, Gerd Dudek, Albert Mangelsdorff, Tom van der Geld, Charles Tolliver, Howard Johnson, Attila Zoller, Philipp van Endert, Leonard Jones, Theo Jörgensmann, Tommy Vig...

Dudas' career has encompassed works commissioned by the Frankfurt Radio Jazz Group, West German Radio & Television/Cologne, Bavarian Radio Munich, Jazzmeeting Baden-Baden/SWR, and Hungarian Radio/Budapest. For many years he has appeared at major European Festivals, such as in The Hague in the Netherlands, Toulouse in France, East-West-Jazz in Nuremberg, Nickelsdorf Confrontations (A), Kato Days in Berlin, in Leverkusen, in Munster, in Viersen, and also in the USA (Mississippi-Rhiene-Gala/Minneapolis-Saint Paul).

Between 1996 and 2006 he was Artistic Director for Concert Series in Neuss/GER. He also written works for clarinet, woodwind chamber music and a Clarinet Method in 2 volumes. He is available on JazzSick Records, Konnex, Double Moon/Challenge, Pannon Jazz/Classic, Edition Musikat.

== Private life ==
Lajos Dudas lives in Überlingen/Lake of Constance, South Germany.
