= Theo Jörgensmann =

German jazz clarinetist (1948–2025)

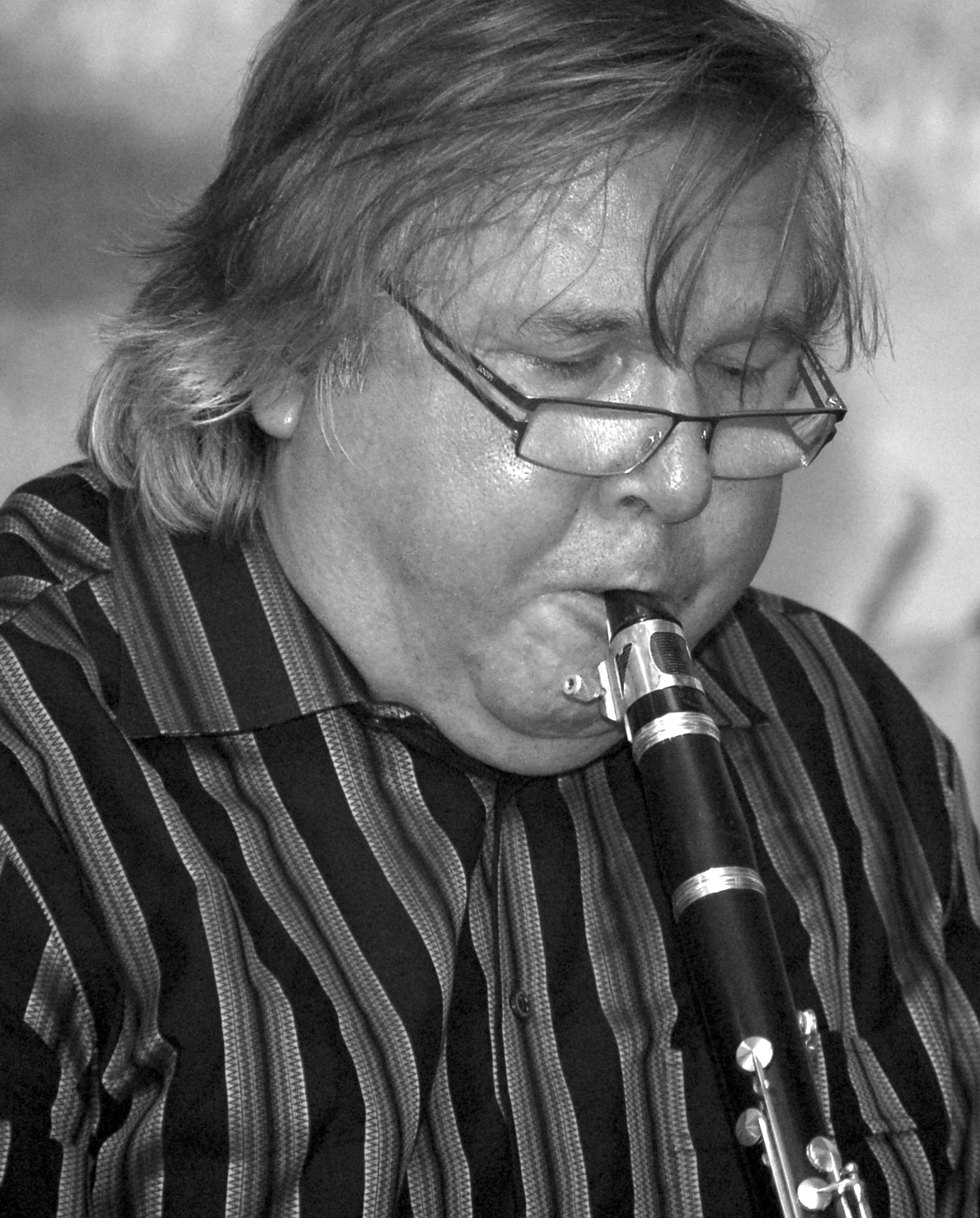
- Jörgensmann in 2009

Background information
- Born: 29 September 1948; Bottrop, North Rhine-Westphalia, Germany
- Died: 6 October 2025 (aged 77) Brüel, Mecklenburg-Vorpommern, Germany
- Genres: Modal jazz; avant-garde jazz; free improvisation
- Occupation: Musician
- Instrument: Clarinet
- Years active: 1975–2025
- Labels: Hathut; Konnex
- Formerly of: Contraband; Klarinettenquartett Cl-4; German Clarinet Duo; Contact Trio; Clarinet Summit; Clarinet Contrast

Theodor Franz Jörgensmann (29 September 1948 – 6 October 2025) was a German jazz clarinetist and academic teacher. Professionally known as Theo Jörgensmann, he belonged to the second generation of European free jazz musicians, part of the clarinet renaissance in the jazz and improvising music scene, and one of few clarinet players for whom unaccompanied solo recordings were a significant part of his work. In 1975 he formed a quartet of clarinetists, Clarinet Contrast, and in 1997 a quartet was named after him. Jörgensmann played in many formations internationally. He wrote a philosophical book about improvising in music.

== Life and career ==
Jörgensmann was born in Bottrop on 29 September 1948. His mother came from East Prussia. He trained to be a chemical technician. He started to play clarinet when he was 18 years old. From 1969 until 1972 Jörgensmann took private lessons from a music teacher at the Folkwang Hochschule in Essen. At the same time he started working with fellow musicians from the Ruhr industrial area. After a one and half year hitch in the Bundeswehr, where he played soprano saxophone, Jörgensmann worked with handicapped children and studied social pedagogy for a few semesters. He appeared at the 1972 Frankfurt Jazz Festival, his first major event, as a member of the Contact Trio, with Michael Jüllich. He became a professional musician in 1975. Early in his career, he often played amplified in jazz rock bands, because there was no jazz scene in North Rhine-Westphalia.

From 1975 to 1977 he led the group Clarinet Contrast, consisting only of clarinets, with Perry Robinson, Hans Kumpf, Bernd Konrad and Michel Pilz. He also founded his first quartet then which became one of Germany's best-known jazz groups by the end of the 1970s. They represented Germany at the festival of the European Broadcasting Union in Hilversum, Netherlands. At the beginning of the 1980s he took part in a Clarinet Summit, which was established by Joachim E. Berendt and himself, with John Carter, Perry Robinson, Ernst-Ludwig Petrowsky, Gianluigi Trovesi and others. Since then Jörgensmann was involved in numerous international projects. He was a member of John Fischer's Interface (1981–1996), Franz Koglmann's Pipetet (1983–1985), Andrea Centazzo's Mitteleuropa Orchestra (1983–1985), and Willem van Manen's Contraband (1985–1998). In 1985 he toured Europe with bassist Barre Phillips and reed player Paul McCandless. He formed a duo with the clarinetist Eckard Koltermann, was leader of Klarinettenquartett Cl-4 and co-founder of the large ensemble Grubenklangorchester. In 1987 Jörgensmann was the subject of a documentary film, Theo Jörgensmann, Bottrop, Klarinette, directed by Christoph Hübner.

From 1982, Jörgensmann presented jazz topics for the WDR. Between 1983 and 1993 he lectured clarinet and ensemble at the University of Duisburg, and from 1993 to 1997 he was a lecturer for free improvising at the music therapeutics institute of the Witten/Herdecke University. Together with the musicologist Rolf-Dieter Weyer, Jörgensmann wrote a philosophical book about improvising in music.

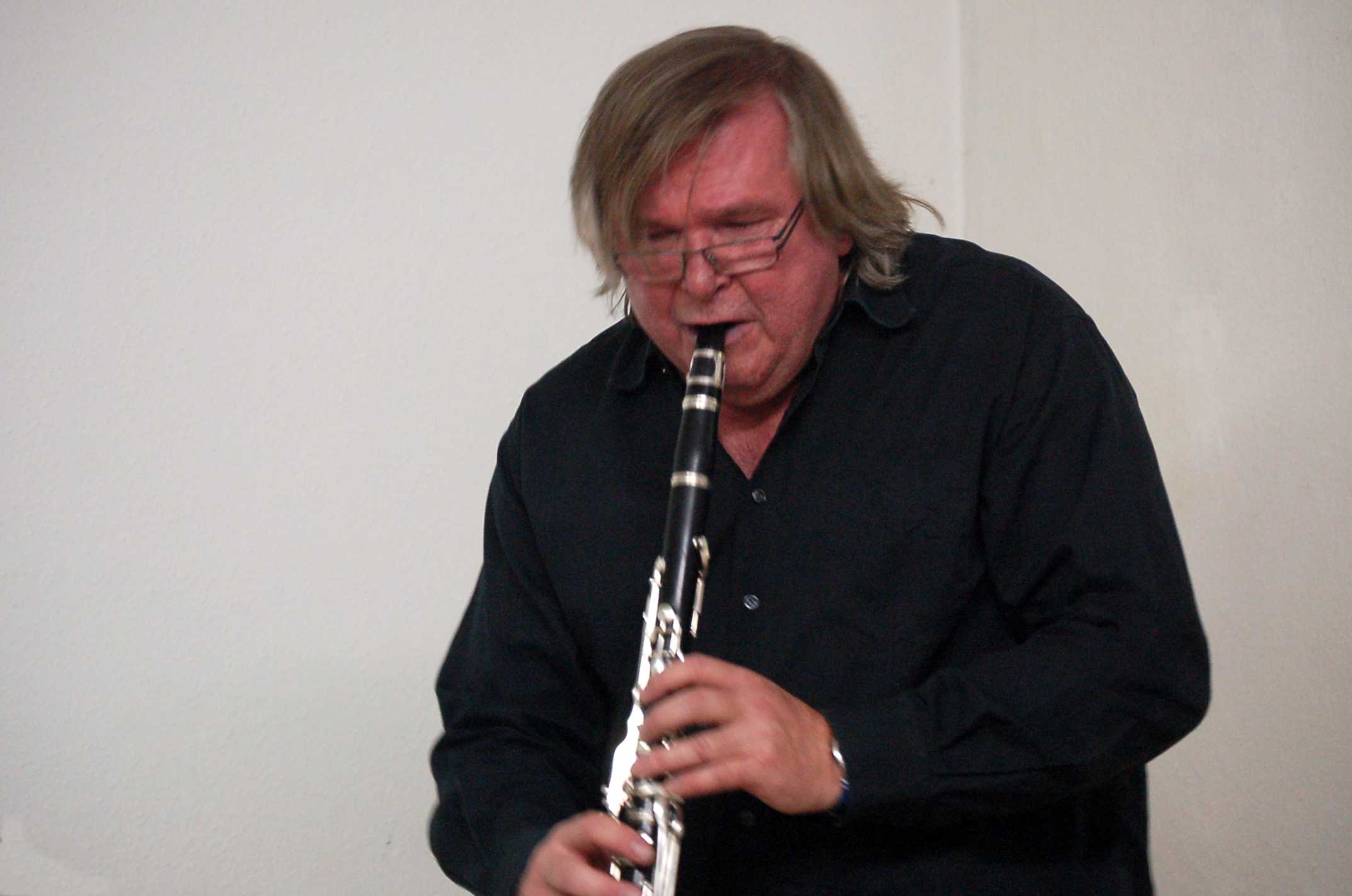
Jörgensmann in 2009

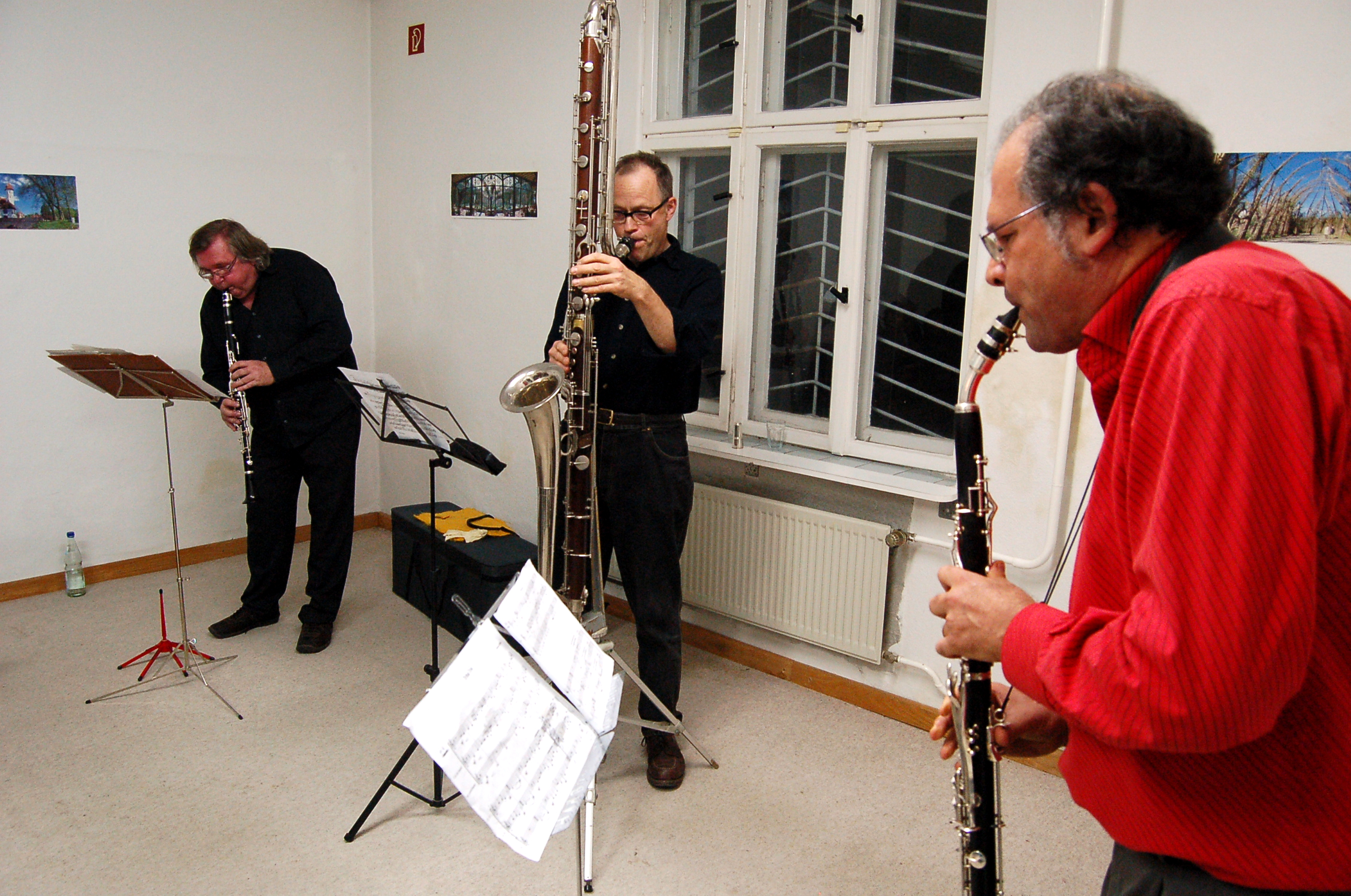
The Tribal Trio, 2009

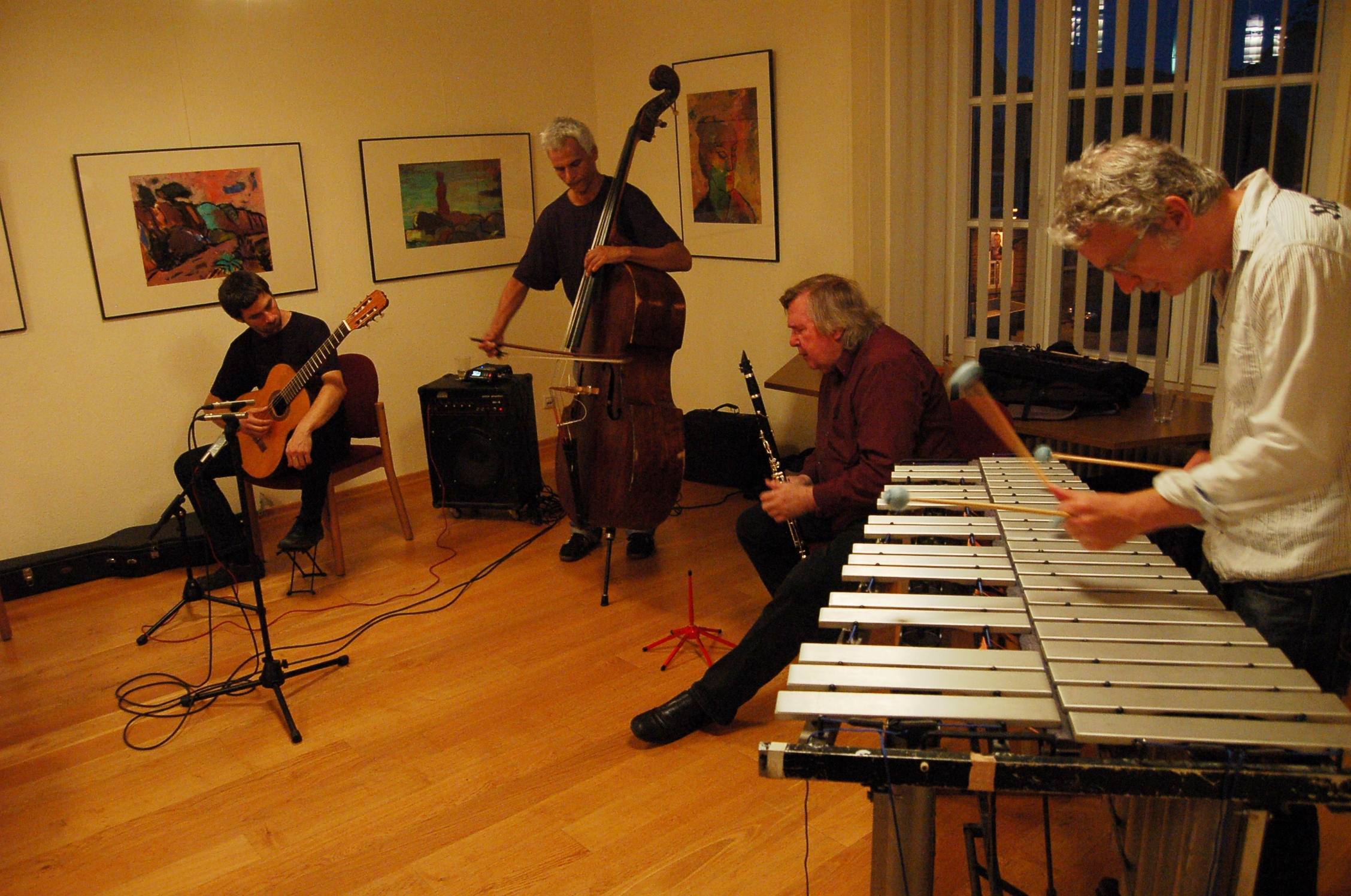
Theo Jörgensmann Freedom Trio and Christopher Dell in 2011

In 1997 Jörgensmann moved to Brüel, a rural area similar to where his mother had lived. He started the Theo Jörgensmann Quartet with Christopher Dell (vibraphone), Christian Ramond (bass) and Klaus Kugel (percussion). They toured in the United States and Canada in 1999, 2001, and 2003, including playing twice at the Montreal International Jazz Festival (1999 and 2003). He also played with the Polish twins Marcin Oles and Bartlomiej Oles since 2003; their album, Oleś Jörgensmann Oleś – Directions, was chosen by the Polish internet jazz magazine Diapason as Record of the Year in 2005.

From 2008 he was a member of Trio Hot with violinist Albrecht Maurer and bassist Peter Jacquemyn, and in 2009 he started the Deep Down Clarinet Duo with the bass clarinet player Ernst Ulrich Deuker. They also work together in the Tribal Trio, a clarinet trio with the French-American clarinetist Etienne Rolin. In 2009 Jörgensmann performed a few concerts with younger musicians from the UK (Seb Rochford, Dominic Lash, Shabaka Hutchings and Noel Taylor) in London. In 2010, he founded, together with his wife, a cultural venue in Brüel for concerts and art exhibitions. In 2011 he formed the Freedom Trio with bassist Ramond and acoustic guitar player Hagen Stüdemann. After a twelve-year break, he also worked together again with pianist Bernd Köppen. Jörgensmann also worked again with Clarinet Summit, with Robinson, Trovesi, Konrad, Maurer, Sebastian Gramss and Günther "Baby" Sommer. In 2018, Jörgensmann was artist in residence at Singers Festival Warsaw, the biggest festival of Jewish culture in Poland.

During a career spanning three decades as a free improviser, Jörgensmann also worked with (among many others) Lee Konitz, Charlie Mariano, Barre Phillips, Kenny Wheeler, Kent Carter and John Fischer.

Jörgensmann died at his home in Brüel on 6 October 2025, at the age of 77.

== Theory ==
Jörgensmann wrote in his book Kleine Ethik der Improvisation:

To find the right balance between communication of motion and non-communication is the major part of improvised music; that communication of motion as a part of interaction in music is an opportunity to create a new structure of time, which the listener could perceive as a new kind of musical space; that the idea of jazz does not depend on a specific material and special form; that the essential aspect of jazz is the fact that jazz musicians discovered the fourth dimension of time in music (they call it swing).

== Discography ==
Cool in Rhythm basset clarinet solo improvisation 2008

- In Time (AKM, 1977) OCLC 725625434
- Straightout! (Europhon, 1978) OCLC 871209964
- Go Ahead Clarinet (CMP, 1978) OCLC 725656409
- Live at Birdland Gelsenkirchen (Europhon, 1978) OCLC 1034782235
- Song of BoWaGe (CMP, 1979) OCLC 725682274
- You Better Fly Away with Clarinet Summit (MPS, 1980) OCLC 699007246
- Next Adventure (CMP, 1981) OCLC 725775702
- Deep Blue Lake with John Fischer (ReEntry, 1984) OCLC 33161440
- Zeitverdichtung (Konnex, 1986)
- Für Den Letzten Gast with Bernd Koppen (Senti, 1986)
- Tauwetter (Kip, 1989)
- Swiss Radio Days Volume Three with John Fischer (ReEntry, 1989) OCLC 34824441
- Introitus with Hans-Günther Wauer (Kip, 1990)
- Live at Music Academy with Federico Sanesi (BMM, 1993)
- Aesthetic Direction (Konnex, 1993) OCLC 838976702
- Merseburger Begegnung with Hans-Günther Wauer (Kip, 1994) OCLC 1183614400
- Pagine Gialle with Eckard Koltermann (hatOLOGY, 1995) OCLC 1157280706
- So I Play (Kip, 1997)
- Ta eko mo (Z.o.o., 1997) OCLC 610681774
- Snijbloemen (hatOLOGY, 1999) OCLC 1203140376
- To Ornette – Hybrid Identity (hatOLOGY, 2002) OCLC 1158309914
- Fellowship (hatOLOGY, 2005) OCLC 912468349
- Alchemia with Oles Brothers (hatOLOGY, 2008) OCLC 658953721
- New Conception of Duo Hagen Studemann (Konnex, 2010)
- Melencolia with Albrecht Maurer (Nemu, 2011) OCLC 823747539
- Blue in Blue with Karoly Binder (BMM, 2011)
- Bucksch (Konnex, 2014) OCLC 1184726026
- Elements in Candor with Krzysztof Dys, Michael Marcus (For Tune, 2016) OCLC 947176262
- Axiomatic 473’ Exploration, with Alessandro Ciccarelli and Lorenzo Santoro (Plus Timbre, 2024)

== Publications ==
- Kleine Ethik der Improvisation: vom Wesen, Zeit und Raum, Material und Spontangestalt, by Theo Jörgensmann & Rolf-Dieter Weyer, with silhouettes of Hermann "Es" Richter ISBN 3-924272-99-9

== Awards ==
- Kunstförderpreis of Aachen 1980
- Kulturpreis of Bottrop 1991
- Jazz Pott of Ruhrgebiet 2018
