= Progressive jazz (disambiguation) =

Progressive jazz is a style of jazz associated with Stan Kenton. It may also refer to:

- Bebop in an evolved form
- Cool jazz, a style of American music developed during the 1940s
- Third stream, a synthesis of jazz and classical music developed during the 1950s
- Jazz fusion, a synthesis of jazz and other styles developed during the 1960s
