= Bob Degen =

American jazz musician

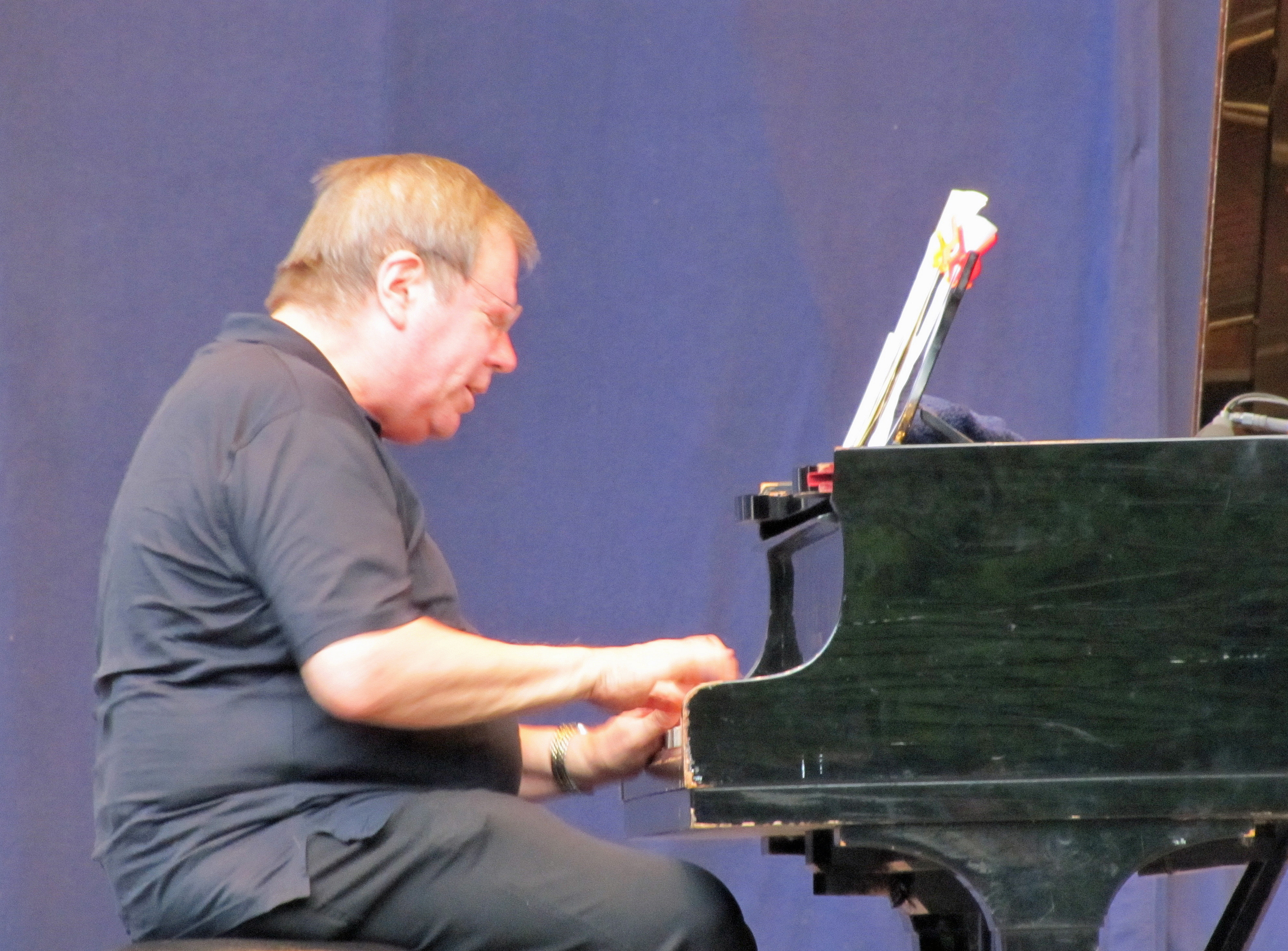
2010 in Frankfurt am Main

Bob Degen Jr (born January 24, 1944, in Scranton, Pennsylvania, United States) is an American jazz pianist. Much of his work has been in the trio format.

== Life and career ==
Degen was born in Scranton, Pennsylvania in 1944. Both of his parents were performers; his father played country and western guitar and his mother was a tap-dancer. He attended Berklee College of Music from 1961 until 1964 and played locally in Boston while there. He was influenced by jazz musician and multi-instrumentalist Art Kreinberg and played in a trio with Kreinberg and bassist Doug Smith in the early 1960s. In the mid-1960s he played in Europe with Dexter Gordon, Art Farmer, Carmell Jones, and Albert Mangelsdorff, and in 1968 recorded an album as leader. At the end of the decade he played with Paul Motian, as well as with Gary Peacock and Buddy DeFranco in the early 1970s.

In 1974 Degen moved to Germany, where he played often with Heinz Sauer. Since then, he has played with Makaya Ntshoko, the Frankfurter Jazz Ensemble, Adelhard Roidinger, Joki Freund, Leszek Zadlo, Günter Lenz, Charlie Mariano, and Uli Beckerhoff.

== Discography ==
=== As leader ===
- Celebrations (Calig, 1968)
- Sequoia Song (Enja, 1976)
- Chartreuse (Enja, 1978)
- Children of the Night (Enja, 1978)
- Hidden Track (Trion, 1981)
- Joy - Friday Night (Dr. Jazz, 1995)
- Catability (Enja, 1998)
- Sandcastle (Free Flow 1998)
- What's Your Dream? (Trion, 2008)
- Jake Remembered (Enja, 2010)
