= Michel Pilz =

German jazz clarinetist (1945–2023)

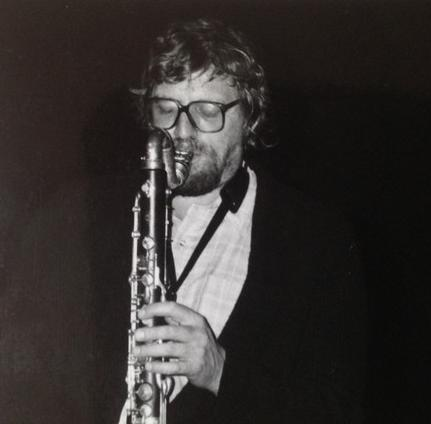
- Pilz in 1989
- Born: 28 October 1945; Bad Neustadt an der Saale, Germany
- Died: 2 November 2023 (aged 78)
- Occupation: Musician

Michel Pilz (28 October 1945 – 2 November 2023) was a German jazz clarinetist.

Pilz was a clarinet student at the Luxembourg Conservatory in the mid-1960s. He then joined Manfred Schoof's ensemble in 1968, an association he would maintain into the 1980s. He also performed with the German All Stars in the 1970s and with the Globe Unity Orchestra, led by Alex Schlippenbach. He founded his own ensemble in 1972, playing with Peter Kowald, Paul Lovens, Buschi Niebergall, and Itaru Oki, among others.

Pilz died on 2 November 2023, at the age of 78.
