= Wings (Franco Ambrosetti album) =

Heartbop

Studio album by Franco Ambrosetti
- Released: 1984
- Recorded: December 1–2, 1983
- Studio: Skyline Studios, NYC
- Genre: Jazz
- Length: 43:00
- Label: Enja; ENJ 4068
- Producer: Horst Weber, Matthias Winckelmann

Franco Ambrosetti chronology
Heartbop (1981)	Heartbop (1984)	Tentets (1985)

Wings is an album by the flugelhornist and composer Franco Ambrosetti which was recorded in 1983 and released on the Enja label the following year.

== Reception ==
Professional ratings
Review scores
Source	Rating
Allmusic	4/5 stars

The Allmusic review by Scott Yanow stated "flugelhornist Franco Ambrosetti's third in a series of consistently rewarding recordings for Enja has a particularly strong group ... The music is solid post-bop, and Clark's French horn is a major plus in the ensembles".

== Track listing ==
All compositions by Franco Ambrosetti except where noted

1. "Miss, Your Quelque Shows" – 10:44
2. "Gin and Pentatonic" – 13:16
3. "Atisiul" (Flavio Ambrosetti) – 14:40
4. "More Wings for Wheelers" (George Gruntz) – 4:20

== Personnel ==
- Franco Ambrosetti – flugelhorn
- Mike Brecker – tenor saxophone
- John Clark – French horn
- Kenny Kirkland – piano
- Buster Williams – bass
- Daniel Humair – drums
