= Tentets =

Studio album by Franco Ambrosetti
- Released: 1985
- Recorded: March 13 & 14, 1985
- Studio: A & R, New York City
- Genre: Jazz
- Length: 43:00
- Label: Enja; ENJ 4096
- Producer: Horst Weber, Matthias Winckelmann

Franco Ambrosetti chronology
Wings (1984)	Tentets (1985)	Movies (1986)

Tentets is an album by the flugelhornist and composer Franco Ambrosetti which was recorded in 1985 and released on the Enja label.

Professional ratings
Review scores
Source	Rating
Allmusic	4/5 stars

== Track listing ==
All compositions by Franco Ambrosetti except where noted

1. "Yes or No" (Wayne Shorter) – 8:07
2. "Rio Morena, Allegro Con Brio" – 10:29
3. "Autumn Leaves" (Joseph Kosma, Jacques Prévert) – 6:15
4. "Ten and Eleven" – 9:08
5. "Ode to a Princess" (George Gruntz) – 10:52

== Personnel ==
- Franco Ambrosetti – flugelhorn
- Lew Soloff – trumpet
- Mike Mossman – trumpet
- Alex Brofsky – French horn
- Steve Coleman – alto saxophone
- Mike Brecker – tenor saxophone
- Howard Johnson – baritone saxophone, tuba
- Tommy Flanagan – piano
- Dave Holland – bass
- Daniel Humair – drums
