= Heartbop =

Studio album by Franco Ambrosetti
- Released: 1981
- Recorded: February 10–11, 1981
- Studios: Sound Ideas Studios, NYC
- Genre: Jazz
- Length: 37:50
- Labels: Enja; ENJ 3087
- Producers: Horst Weber, Matthias Winckelmann

Franco Ambrosetti chronology
Sleeping Gypsy (1980)	Heartbop (1981)	Wings (1983)

Heartbop is an album by the flugelhornist and composer Franco Ambrosetti which was recorded in 1981 and released on the Enja label.

== Reception ==
Professional ratings
Review scores
Source	Rating
Allmusic	2.5/5 stars

The Allmusic review by Scott Yanow stated "Although flugelhornist Franco Ambrosetti is only a part-time musician (making his main living as a businessman), his playing has always been at a high level ... Advanced hard bop".

== Track listing ==
All compositions by Franco Ambrosetti except where noted

1. "Triple Play" (Hal Galper) – 10:24
2. "Fairy Boat to Rio" – 7:40
3. "Heart Bop" – 6:17
4. "A Flat Miner" – 5:09
5. "My Funny Valentine" (Richard Rodgers, Lorenz Hart) – 9:20

== Personnel ==
- Franco Ambrosetti – flugelhorn
- Phil Woods – alto saxophone, clarinet
- Hal Galper – piano
- Mike Richmond – bass
- Billy Hart – drums
- George Gruntz – arranger (tracks 2–4)
