= Light Breeze =

Studio album by Franco Ambrosetti
- Released: April 21, 1998
- Recorded: April 11 & 12, 1997
- Studio: Avatar (New York, New York)
- Genre: Jazz
- Length: 55:48
- Label: Enja; ENJ 9331
- Producer: Matthias Winckelmann

Franco Ambrosetti chronology
Live at the Blue Note (1992)	Light Breeze (1998)	Grazie Italia (2001)

Light Breeze is an album by the flugelhornist and composer Franco Ambrosetti which was recorded in 1997 and released on the Enja label the following year.

== Reception ==
Professional ratings
Review scores
Source	Rating
Allmusic	4/5 stars

In JazzTimes, Patricia Myers stated "The pure tone and graceful fluency of Franco Ambrosetti’s flugelhorn is absolutely enthralling throughout this diverse collection".

== Track listing ==
All compositions by Franco Ambrosetti except where noted

1. "Versace" (Daniel Humair) – 6:33
2. "Silli's Nest (Interlude 1)" – 1:31
3. "Deborah" (Gian Luca Ambrosetti) – 9:02
4. "Culture and Sensitivity (Interlude 2)" (John Abercrombie) – 1:43
5. "Contempo Latinsky" – 7:13
6. "Elegia (Interlude 3)" (Antonio Faraò) – 1:08
7. "My Foolish Heart" (Victor Young, Ned Washington) – 7:25
8. "Virtuosismo (Interlude 4)" (Miroslav Vitous) – 1:20
9. "One for the Kids" (George Gruntz) – 6:01
10. "Percussion Dreams (Interlude 5)" (Billy Drummond) – 2:14
11. "Giant Steps" (John Coltrane) – 5:53
12. "Silli in the Sky" – 5:45

== Personnel ==
- Franco Ambrosetti – flugelhorn
- John Abercrombie – guitar
- Antonio Faraò – piano
- Miroslav Vitous – bass
- Billy Drummond – drums
