= Movies Too =

Studio album by Franco Ambrosetti
- Released: 1988
- Recorded: March 22–23, 1988
- Studio: Van Gelder Studio, Englewood Cliffs, NJ
- Genre: Jazz
- Length: 49:10
- Label: Enja; ENJ 5079
- Producer: Matthias Winckelmann

Franco Ambrosetti chronology
Movies (1987)	Movies Too (1988)	Music for Symphony and Jazz Band (1991)

Movies Too is an album by the flugelhornist Franco Ambrosetti which was recorded in 1988 and released on the Enja label.

The album includes music from Rose of Washington Square, Jennifer, Superman, Peter Gunn, Cinderella, What's New Pussycat?, Lady Sings the Blues, and Steppenwolf.

== Reception ==
Professional ratings
Review scores
Source	Rating
Allmusic	4.5/5 stars

The Allmusic review by Scott Yanow stated "This second CD of movie themes once again finds flugelhornist Franco Ambrosetti transforming some unpromising themes into jazz ... The inventive arrangements feature excellent solos ... Well worth checking out".

== Track listing ==
1. "My Man" (Maurice Yvain, Jacques Charles, Albert Willemetz, Channing Pollock) – 3:48
2. "Angel Eyes" (Matt Dennis, Earl Brent) – 10:47
3. "Theme from Superman" (John Williams) – 6:36
4. "Theme from Peter Gunn" (Henry Mancini) – 3:29
5. "Cinderella's Waltz" (Mack David, Al Hoffman, Jerry Livingston) – 2:09
6. "What's New Pussycat?" (Burt Bacharach, Hal David) – 6:27
7. "God Bless the Child" (Billie Holiday, Arthur Herzog Jr.) – 9:29
8. "Steppenwolf" (George Gruntz) – 6:39

== Personnel ==
- Franco Ambrosetti – flugelhorn
- John Scofield – guitar
- Greg Osby – alto saxophone, soprano saxophone
- Geri Allen – piano
- Michael Formanek – bass
- Daniel Humair – drums
