= Kurt Weil =

Swiss musician and radio host (1932–2012)

Kurt Weil (2 January 1932 – 12 December 2012) was a Swiss jazz vibraphonist.

Weil was born in Zürich. He learned piano and trombone as a youth, but was playing vibraphone professionally by 1952, as a member of Rio de Gregori's ensemble. He moved to Stockholm in 1955, playing with Hacke Björksten, Stan Getz, and Tony Scott (musician). He founded his own group in 1957, which included Raymond Court, George Gruntz, and Daniel Humair as sidemen; this ensemble played for more than a decade in varying forms. In the 1970s, Weil ended the band and moved back to Switzerland, working for GRP Records and running a jazz radio program. He returned to music in the 1990s with a new band, playing with Joe Beck, Mark Egan, and Danny Gottlieb.

Weil died on 12 December 2012, of natural causes.
