= Simon Nabatov =

Russian-American jazz pianist (born 1959)

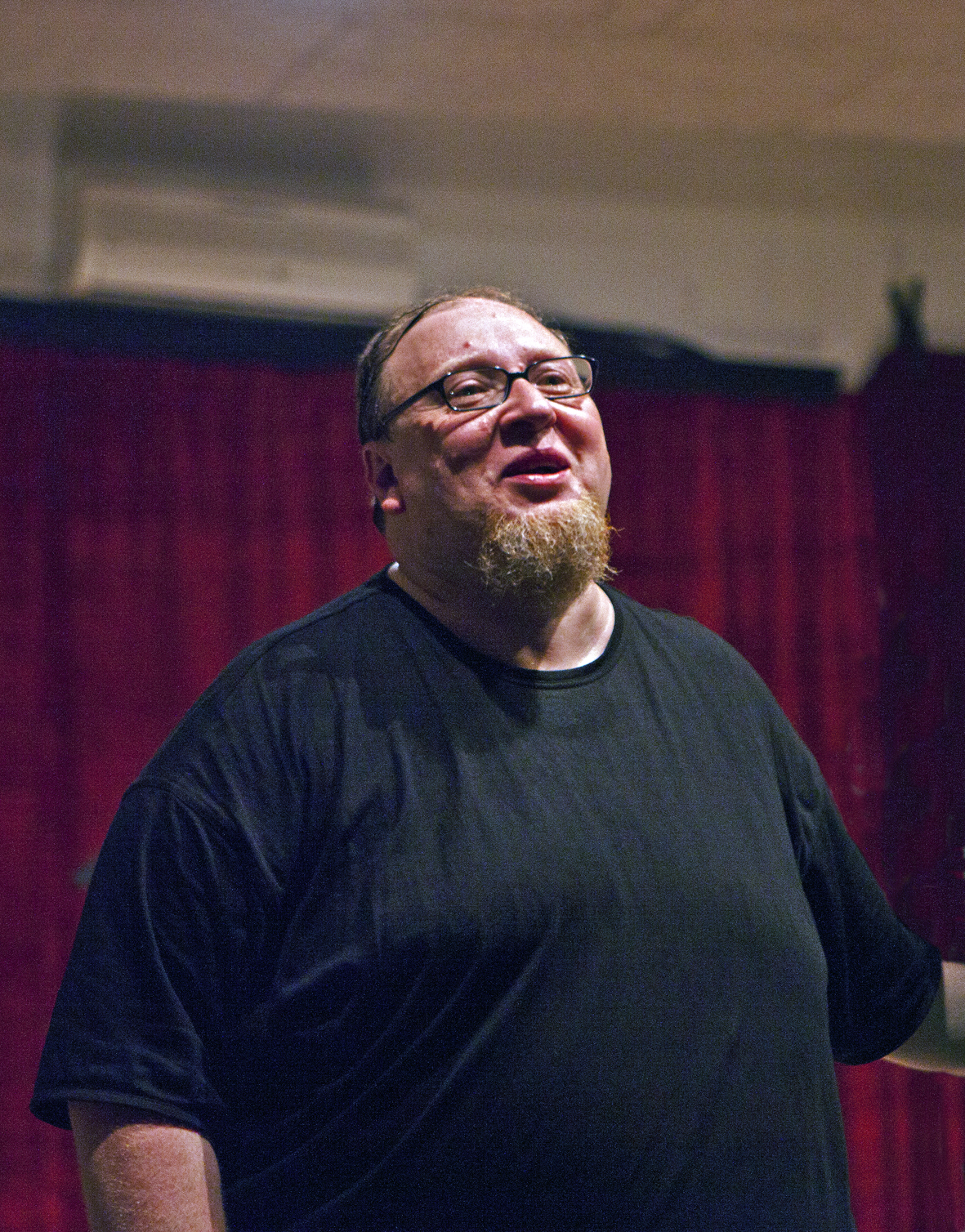
- Nabatov in 2010

Background information
- Born: 11 January 1959 (age 67); Moscow, Russia
- Genre: Jazz
- Occupations: Musician, composer
- Instrument: Piano
- Label: Leo
- Website: nabatov.com

Simon Nabatov (born 11 January 1959) is a Russian-American jazz pianist.

== Early life ==
Nabatov was born in Moscow on 11 January 1959. His parents were Leon, a professional pianist and choir conductor who was a native of Belarus, and Regina. Nabatov began playing the piano at the age of three and his first composition was at six.

He attended a Duke Ellington concert in Moscow in 1971 and his determination to become a jazz musician was reinforced a year later at a Thad Jones–Mel Lewis Orchestra performance. By the age of 17 he was playing bebop with other musicians in Moscow. His formal education in music was at the Central School of Music and then the Moscow Conservatory.

Nabatov and his parents were permitted to leave the Soviet Union in 1979. This was ostensibly to join family members in Israel, but the Nabatovs instead flew to Italy and applied for visas to enter the United States. While waiting for a visa, Nabatov gained experience by becoming the house pianist at the Mississippi Jazz Club in Rome and was helped and encouraged by clarinettist Tony Scott. The family eventually reached the United States and settled in LeFrak City in Queens, New York City.

== Later life and career ==
Nabatov attended the Juilliard School from 1980 to 1984. In 1981, he accompanied avant-garde dancer Kazuo Ohno in performances in New York. In 1984, the magazine Keyboard named him Best Pianist. After graduating, "he played chamber music and accompanied choirs and former Soviet singing stars touring the growing circuit of Russian communities in the United States." He became an American citizen in 1986. That year, he recorded a trio album, Circle the Line, with bassist Ed Schuller and drummer Paul Motian. Often travelling to Europe, he was a member of bands led by Ray Anderson, Arthur Blythe, Steve Lacy and Perry Robinson, and played with the NDR Hamburg radio big band. Nabatov also toured Germany with Matthias Schubert, "with the drummer Ernst Bier, and with a tap-dance group". In 1989, he and his German partner settled in Cologne.

Nabatov made his name with a series of inventive trio albums with Mark Helias and Tom Rainey; he also often works with the trombonist Nils Wogram in duet or in larger ensembles. His most important work so far, however, has been a series of albums on Leo devoted to jazz tone-poem responses to Russian authors. Nature Morte is based on a poem by Joseph Brodsky; The Master and Margarita is a suite inspired by the novel of the same name by Mikhail Bulgakov, and the 2024 Raging Bulgakov focuses on that writer's earlier short works. A Few Incidences and No Kharms Done both consist of settings of the enigmatic texts of the poet Daniil Kharms. Crucial to the vocal discs have been the contributions of British singer Phil Minton.

Nabatov has taught at several institutions, including the Folkwang Hochschule in Essen (1989–91), the International Jazz and Rock Academy in Remscheid (1991–93), and the Musikhochschule Luzern.

== Discography ==
=== As leader or co-leader ===
Year recorded	Title	Label	Personnel/Notes
1989?	Solo–Duo–Trio–Quartet	2nd Floor	With Michael Moore, Frank Gratkowski, Nils Wogram (trombone), Phil Minton (vocals)
1986	Circle the Line	GM	With Ed Schuller (bass), Paul Motian (drums), Arto Tuncboyaci (percussion)
1989?	Inside, Looking Out	Tutu	Quartet with Ed Schuller (bass), John Betsch (drums), Arto Tuncboyaci (percussion)
1988	Locomotion	ASP	Solo piano
1989?	Six by Two	Terrace	Duo with Ronan Guilfoyle (bass guitar)
1990	For All the Marbles	ASP	Trio, with Mark Helias (bass), Barry Altschul (drums)
1990	Dancing on the Edge	Klavins	Solo piano
1993	Tough Customer	Enja	Trio, with Mark Helias (bass), Tom Rainey (drums)
1994	Shall We Dance?	2nd Floor	Solo piano
1996	Swing Kings	ACT	Trio with Wolfgang Schlüter (vibraphone), Charly Antolini (drums); in concert
1999	Sneak Preview	hatOLOGY	Trio, with Mark Helias (bass), Tom Rainey (drums)
1999	The Master and Margarita	Leo	Quintet, with Herb Robertson (trumpet), Mark Feldman (violin), Mark Helias (bass), Tom Rainey (drums)
1999	Nature Morte	Leo	Quartet, with Nils Wogram (trombone), Frank Gratkowski (clarinet, alto sax, bass clarinet, flute), Phil Minton (vocals)
2000?	As We Don't Know It	Kennex	Duo, with Nils Wogram (trombone)
2000	Starting a Story	ACT	Duo, with Nils Wogram (trombone)
2000	Perpetuum Immobile	Leo	Solo piano
2000	Three Stories, One End	ACT	Trio, with Drew Gress (bass), Tom Rainey (drums)
2001	Chat Room	Leo	Duo, with Han Bennink (drums)
2003	Autumn Music	Leo	Trio, with Ernst Reijseger (cello), Michael Vatcher (drums); in concert
2004	A Few Incidences	Leo	Octet, with Nils Wogram (trombone), Frank Gratkowski (clarinet, alto sax, bass clarinet, flute), Ernst Reijseger (cello), Matt Penman (bass), Michael Sarin (drums), Cor Fuhler (electronics, keyolin), Phil Minton (vocals)
2005	Around Brazil	ACT	Solo piano
2005	Steady Now	Leo	Duo, with Tom Rainey (drums)
2005?	The Move	BTLCHR	Duo, with Nils Wogram (trombone)
2006?	A Felicidade	Plushmusic.tv	Solo piano
2006	Jazz Limbo	Leo	Duo, with Nils Wogram (trombone)
2006	Meeting Point	Audioguy	Duo, with Park Je-Chun (drums); in concert
2007?	Leo Records 25th Anniversary	Leo	Album shared with other musicians
2007	Spinning Songs of Herbie Nichols	Leo	Solo piano; in concert; released 2012
2009?	Nicht ohne Robert	JazzHousMusik	Quartet, with Rudi Mahall, Robert Landfermann (bass), Christian Lillinger
2010?	Roundup	Leo	Quintet, with Nils Wogram (trombone), Matthias Schubert (sax), Ernst Reijseger (cello), Tom Rainey (drums)
2010?	Concert "Live" à Bordeaux	Ouhman	Duo, with Touria Hadraoui (vocals); in concert
2010?	Deployment	Leo	Trio, with Frank Gratkowski (alto sax, clarinet), Marcus Schmickler (computer)
2011?	Moods and Modes	NWOG	Duo, with Nils Wogram (trombone)
2011?	Square Down	Leo	Trio, with Ernst Reijseger (cello), Matthias Schubert (tenor sax)
2012?	Nawora	Leo	Trio, with Nils Wogram (trombone), Tom Rainey (drums)
2012	21-9-12	Leo	Trio, with Oğuz Büyükberber (clarinet), Gerry Hemingway (drums); in concert
2013?	Descriptions	Leo	Duo, with Matthias Schubert (sax); in concert
1995–2013	Monk 'n' More	Leo	Solo piano, electronics; released 2016
2014?	Encounters	Leo	Trio, with Luc Houtkamp (sax), Martin Blume (drums)
2010–14	Lubatov	Leo	Duo, with Gareth Lubbe (vocals)
2014	Projections	Clean Feed	Duo, with Mark Dresser (bass); in concert
2015?	Leo Records, 35th Anniversary, Moscow	Leo	Quartet, with Frank Gratkowski and Alexey Kruglov (sax), Oleg Yudanov (drums)
2015?	Equal Poise	Leo	Trio, with Mark Dresser (bass), Dominik Mahnig (drums); in concert
2016?	Picking Order	Leo	Trio, with Stefan Schoenegg, Dominik Mahnig (drums)
2016?	Wobbly Strata	Trytone	Duo, with Oğuz Büyükberber (clarinet)
2017?	Mirthful Myths	Leo	Duo, with Frank Gratkowski
2017?	Free Reservoir	Leo	Trio, with Max Johnson (bass), Michael Sarin (drums)
2017	Tunes I Still Play		Solo piano; in concert
2017	Not Seeing Is a Flower	Leo	Quartet, with Akira Sakata (alto sax, clarinet, vocals, percussion), Takashi Seo (bass), Darren Moore (drums, percussion); in concert
2018	Luminous	NoBusiness	Trio, with Barry Guy, Gerry Hemingway
2020	Dance Hall Stories	Leo	Trio, with Frank Gratkowski, Dominik Mahnig
2020	PLAIN	Clean Feed	With Chris Speed, Herb Robertson, John Hébert, Tom Rainey
2021	Voluptuaries	Leo	Duo, with Brandon Seabrook
2021	Live in Matsuyama	Lao Ban	Trio, with Darren Moore, Takashi Seo
2021	Brooklyn Mischiefs	Leo	Duo, with Michae͏̈l Attias
2021	LOVES	Leo	Eleven-piece ensemble
2022	No Kharms Done	Leo	With Phil Minton, Matthias Schubert, Wolter Wierbos, Jim Black
2023	Extensions	Unbroken Sounds	With Sebastian Gille, Shannon Barnett, Reza Askari, David Helm, Mária Portugal
2023	Verbs	Clean Feed	With Leonhard Huhn, Philip Zoubek, Stefan Schönegg, Dominik Mahnig
2024	Raging Bulgakov	FS	

=== As sideman ===
With Perry Robinson

- Nightmare Island Live at the Leverkusener Jazztage (West Wind, 1989)
- Call to the Stars (West Wind, 1990)
- Angelology (Phonector, 2006)

With Nils Wogram

- Round Trip (Enja, 1996)
- Speed Life (Enja, 1998)
- Odd and Awkward (Enja, 2001)
- Construction Field (Altrisuoni, 2003)
- The Move (Between the Lines, 2005)
- Portrait of a Band (Enja, 2007)
- Moods & Modes (Nwog, 2010)

With others

- Franco Ambrosetti, Music for Symphony and Jazz Band (Enja, 1991)
- Ray Anderson, Every One of Us (Gramavision, 1992)
- Michael Gibbs & NDR Bigband, Back in the Days (Cuneiform, 2012)
- Alfred 23 Harth, POPendingEYE (Free Flow Music, 1993)
- Rolf Liebermann & NDR Big Band, Concerto for Jazz Band and Symphony Orchestra (Naxos, 2002)
- Rudi Mahall, Nicht Ohne Robert Vol. 1 (Jazz Haus Musik, 2009)
- Paul Motian, Circle the Line (GM, 1988)
- Marcin Oles, Walk Songs (Fenommedia, 2006)
- Daniel Schnyder, Winds (Koch, 1991)
- Sources
