= Bennie Wallace =

American saxophonist (born 1946)

- Born: Bennie Lee Wallace Jr. November 18, 1946 (age 79); Chattanooga, Tennessee, U.S.
- Genres: Jazz
- Occupation: Musician
- Instrument: Tenor saxophone
- Years active: 1971–present
- Labels: Enja, Blue Note, BackCountry Jazz

Bennie Wallace (born November 18, 1946) is an American jazz tenor saxophonist.

== Biography ==
Wallace was born in Chattanooga, Tennessee. He began playing in local clubs with the encouragement of East Ridge, Tennessee High School band director and drummer Chet Hedgecoth and professional reed player Billy Usselton, who appeared as a guest at a stage band festival, and heard Wallace with the East Ridge High School Swing Band. After studying clarinet at the University of Tennessee, Wallace settled in New York in 1971 with the encouragement of Monty Alexander, who hired him and recommended him to the American Federation of Musicians local, which virtually guaranteed his entry. Wallace played with Barry Harris, Buddy Rich, Dannie Richmond. His debut recording was done with Flip Phillips and Scott Hamilton in 1977. He has cited Sonny Rollins and Coleman Hawkins among many major saxophone influences. He recorded on the revived Blue Note label in 1985; the label's earlier issues provided much of the most influential music of his formative years, and the eclectic cast on the album Twilight Time reflects the mix of musical styles he encountered in the local club scene of Chattanooga, such as the Blue Room, the AmVets Club and Katie's Four O'Clock Club. Country and western, western swing, and rock and roll all required familiarity with key signatures and repertoire favored by guitarists. Wallace toured and recorded with trombonist Ray Anderson, whose technical skills allowed both musicians to explore a broad repertoire not always associated with jazz music.

Wallace has provided original music for Ron Shelton's films Blaze and White Men Can't Jump.

== Discography ==
=== As leader ===
- The Fourteen Bar Blues (Enja, 1978)
- Live at the Public Theater (Enja, 1978)
- The Free Will (Enja, 1980)
- Bennie Wallace Plays Monk (Enja, 1981)
- The Bennie Wallace Trio & Chick Corea (Enja, 1982)
- Big Jim's Tango (Enja, 1983)
- Sweeping Through the City (Enja, 1984)
- Twilight Time (Blue Note, 1985)
- The Art of the Saxophone (Denon, 1987)
- Mystic Bridge (Enja, 1987)
- Bordertown (Blue Note, 1988)
- Brilliant Corners (Denon, 1988)
- The Old Songs (AudioQuest, 1993)
- The Talk of the Town (Enja, 1993)
- Bennie Wallace (AudioQuest, 1998)
- Someone to Watch Over Me (Enja, 1999)
- Bennie Wallace in Berlin (Enja, 2001)
- Moodsville (Groove Note, 2001)
- The Nearness of You (Justin Time, 2004)
- Disorder at the Border (Enja, 2006)
- French Postcard (BackCountry Jazz, 2026)

=== As sideman ===
- Mose Allison, Ever Since the World Ended (Blue Note, 1987)
- Franco Ambrosetti, Close Encounter (Enja, 1978)
- Solomon Burke, Don't Give Up On Me (Fat Possum, 2002)
- Art Farmer, Round About Midnight (Jugoton, 1981)
- George Gruntz, GG-CJB (MPS, 1979)
- Nancy King and Glen Moore, Potato Radio (Justice, 1992)
- Chuck Marohnic, Copenhagen Suite (SteepleChase, 1979)
- Mighty Sam McClain, Give It Up to Love (AudioQuest, 1993)
- Oregon, Friends (Vanguard, 1977)
- Eric Watson, Full Metal Quartet (Owl, 2000)
- Anthony Wilson, Anthony Wilson (Mama, 1997)
- Anthony Wilson, Goat Hill Junket (Mama, 1998)
- Akiko Yano, Granola (Midi, 1987)
