= Daniel Schnyder =

Swiss jazz reedist and composer (born 1961)

- Born: March 12, 1961 (age 64); Zürich, Switzerland
- Genres: Jazz, Classical
- Occupation(s): Musician, composer
- Instrument(s): Saxophone, clarinet, flute
- Labels: Enja
- Website: danielschnyder.com

Daniel Schnyder (born March 12, 1961) is a Swiss jazz reedist and composer of both jazz and classical music.

Schnyder learned to play cello before saxophone. He attended Berklee College of Music and the Conservatory of Winterthur. He has recorded for Enja Records and composes pieces which meld jazz and classical music. His work has been published by Hal Leonard, Universal Edition, and Edition Kunzelmann; he has been commissioned by Vienna Art Orchestra, NDR Big Band, Opera Philadelphia, Milwaukee Symphony Orchestra and Berlin Philharmonic. Sidemen on his albums include Michael Philip Mossman, Marvin "Smitty" Smith, Kenny Drew Jr., Dave Taylor, Adam Taubitz, Michael Formanek, and Mark Feldman. He has also worked with Flavio Ambrosetti, Lee Konitz, and Abdullah Ibrahim.

== Discography ==
- Secret Cosmos (Enja, 1988)
- The City (Enja, 1989)
- Decoding the Message (Enja, 1990)
- Mythen (Koch, 1991)
- Mythology (Enja 1991)
- Granulat with Mossman (Red, 1991)
- Nucleus (Enja, 1995)
- Tarantula (Enja, 1996)
- Words Within Music (Enja, 1999)
- Jazz Meets Weill and Gershwin with Kurt Weill, David Taylor, Kenny Drew Jr. (Koch, 2000)
- Songbook with Kenny Drew Jr., Kristjan Jaervi, Symphony Orchestra of Norrlands Opera (CCn'C, 2002)
- Zoom In (Universal/EmArcy, 2003)
- Da Skale with Kenny Drew Jr. (TCB, 2003)
- Colossus of Sound with NDR Radio Philharmonic Orchestra, Kristjan Järvi, Reinhold Friedrich, Kathrin Rabus (Enja, 2004)
- Just Follow Instructions with Adam Unsworth (Block M, 2009)
- Manhattanite (Neuklang, 2010)
- Around the World with Stefan Schulz (BIS, 2011)
- Daniel Schnyder (Migros-Kulturprozent, 2011)

== As sideman ==
- Franco Ambrosetti, Music for Symphony and Jazz Band (Enja, 1991)
