= Heidi Köpfer =

Swiss choreographer, dancer and video artist

- Born: 1954 (age 71–72); Basel, Switzerland
- Occupations: Choreographer; dancer; video artist

Heidi Köpfer (born 1954 in Basel) is a Swiss choreographer, dancer and video artist.

== Life and work ==
From 1975 to 1980 Heidi Köpfer studied various dance techniques in Switzerland and abroad. She has been teaching dance since 1977. From 1977 to 1987 she worked as a teacher and assistant at the Othella Dallas Dance School Basel. In 1988 she began to explore the artistic possibilities of the media dance and video and worked with these media in educational institutions. In 1987 she founded her own school for dance in Basel. She creates her own video projects and multimedia productions with other artists.

== Recognition and awards ==
Motion received a prize at the "5th Film- und Videotage der Region Basel", in 1989 and the main prize in all categories at the "Festival "Semana Internacional de Cine" in Teruel, Spain, in 1990. Changes was awarded at the "Ecrans sans frontières" festival in Mulhouse, France in 1998. Intermezzo received the "Hans-Züllig Prize" for the best dance film as well as the "International Jury Award" at the "51st Mostra del Cortometraggio di Montecatini", "FILMVIDEO 2000" in Italy and also in 2000 the "Prix Eurorégion" at the 18th international French-Spanish "Festival Vidéo D'Estavar-Llivia". Her dance films have been shown at around 250 festivals and events worldwide until 2019, broadcast by various television stations (SF DRS, 3-sat, TSI, Channel 4, VOX etc.) and are part of video collections.

== Choreography and dance (selection) ==
- 1977-1985 Performances as a dancer with Othella Dallas, Syrinx Dance Company, own dance group
- since 1980 choreographer
- since 1984 cooperation with photographers
- 1989 Performance as solo dancer with the Teatro Clé in Freiburg i. B., Germany
- 1990 solo dancer in the music video project "Grand Bazar" by Raymond A. Schlosser, Zurich
- 1991 dance solo "Begegnung", Kaserne Basel
- 1993 dance solo "verstrickt", Modern Dance Night, World Dance Festival Basel
- solo dancer in the multimedia performance "for some reason", Kaserne Basel (video: Mirek Pazdera, live electronics: Günter Müller)
- Dance solo "Mobile I", Theaterhaus Gessnerallee Zurich, Kaserne Basel
- 1994 solo dancer in the multimedia performance "record-rewind-PLAY", Zurich, Geneva, Basel (video: Brian D. Goff, live electronics: Günter Müller)
- 1995, dance solo "Mobile II", Kaserne Basel, Théâtre de l'Arsenic, Lausanne
- since 1997 collaboration with visual artists
- 1997 dancer in the multimedia performance "spheres & mouvements", Sudhaus/Warteck Basel (projection: Heinz Schäublin, sound composition: Urs Rickenbacher)
- Participation in the Mörser Project Basel with the dance solos "Waterworks" and "Hag"
- solo dancer in the multimedia performance "Das rote Ding", Kaserne Basel (projection: Heinz Schäublin, sound composition: Urs Rickenbacher)
- 1998-2005 solo dancer in the intermedia photo projects "Camouflage" and "Megacity", various exhibitions (photography: Jean-Pierre Addor, projection: Heinz Schäublin)
- 2000 solo dancer in the audio-visual show "danse obscure", Performing Art Night, Unternehmen Mitte Basel and Gundeldinger Kunsthalle Basel (visual design: Heinz Schäublin, photography: Jean-Pierre Addor, sound composition: Urs Rickenbacher)
- 2002 solo dancer in the multimedia performance "Mutations" (projection: Heinz Schäublin, sound composition: Urs Rickenbacher), various performances
- 2003 solo dancer at the Galerie Werkstatt Reinach (installation: Heinz Schäublin, live music: Felix Probst)
- 2005 dance solo "Transition I", Kaserne Basel
- 2006 solo dancer in the photo projects "Körperzelle" and "Flucht" (Photography: Rolf Bürgin)
- 2008 solo dancer in the multimedia performance "Alice" (Projection: Heinz Schäublin, Sounds: Tassilo Dellers), Imprimerie Basel
- dancer in the photo project "Swan Lake" by Michael Koritschan
- 2009 solo dancer in the multimedia performance "Im Garten Wunderland", Unternehmen Mitte Basel (performance, voice, sound: Nicoletta Stalder)
- 2010 dance solo "ZwischenRaum I", E-Werk Freiburg i. B., Germany (live marimba: Hartmut Nold)
- 2012 dance solo "ZwischenRaum II", Unternehmen Mitte Basel (live marimba: Hartmut Nold)
- 2012/13/16 Interactive dance performance "metoso", Werkraum Warteck pp Basel, Reithalle Bern, Kulturhaus Royal Baden (audiovisual installation: Michel Winterberg)
- 2019 Choreography "Just Bees and Things and Flowers", duet with the dancer Jeremy Nedd, Theater Roxy, Birsfelden
- 2021/22 dance solo "In Memoriam", Triangel Meeting Basel, QuBa Basel
- 2023 dance solo "Improvisation", QuBa Basel
- 2024 dance solo "Stuck", QuBa Basel

== Works in collections and online ==
- Sammlung Neue Medien Baselland, Switzerland
- Heure Exquise !: International centre for video arts
- SAPA Foundation, Swiss Archive of the Performing Arts, SAPA Foundation, Fonds
- Swiss Performing Arts Archive, SAPA Foundation, Dossier
- New York Public Library for the Performing Arts, Jerome Robbins Dance Division
- German Dance Film Institute Bremen
- German Dance Archive, Cologne
- International Music and Media Centre (IMZ), Vienna

== Videos ==
- 1989: Motion, 13 minutes, Beta SP
- 1991: Puzzle, 13 minutes, Beta SP
- 1994: Mikado, 12 minutes, Beta SP
- 1996: Changes, 15 minutes, Beta SP
- 1999: Intermezzo, 13 minutes, Beta SP
- 2001: Whatsoever, 17 minutes, Digital Beta
- 2004: Korewori, 17 minutes, Digital Beta
- 2007: Walls, 13 minutes, DVCPRO50-DV
- 2011: Wind choreography, 1 minute, DV, in collaboration with Nicoletta Stalder
- 2018: Mara, 15 minutes, QT HD-DCP, 25p

== Literature ==
- Basel tanzt anders, published by IG Tanz Basel/Tanz-Kampagne, Schwabe, ISBN 3-7965-2058-8
- Megacity, Heinz Schäublin, Ute Stoecklin, Jean-Pierre Addor, Heidi Köpfer, Edition Hirschkuh, www.edition.ch, ISBN 978-3-9523102-9-8
- Lexikon der Schweizerischen Tanzschaffenden, Alain Bernard, Traber Verlag Bern, ISBN 3-9520699-1-4
- Schweizer Tanz-Ensembles & Solokünster/innen, Bulletin 5'94, Swiss Umbrella Association of Artistic Dance Professionals SDT
- Cut, Film- und Videomacherinnen Schweiz von den Anfängen bis 1994. Eine Bestandesaufnahme, Stroemfeld/Nexus, ISBN 3-86109-111-9
- Videotanz, Panorama einer intermedialen Kunstform, by Claudia Rosiny, Theatrum Helveticum 5, edited by Andreas Kotte, Institute, ISBN 3-905313-23-5
- WRO 97 VI International Media Art Biennale, OPEN STUDIO and Contributors, ISBN 83-903824-3-1
- L'art Vidéo 1980–1999, Vingt ans du Video Art Festival, Locarno Recherches, théories, perspectives sous * la direction de Vittorio Fagone, 1999, ISBN 3-905313-23-5
- Tanz + Bildende Kunst, Aspekte der Wechselbeziehung - Kunst und Kulturwissenschaft in der Gegenwart by Nele Lipp, EBOOK Athena, ISBN 3-905313-23-5
