= Dave Taylor (trombonist) =

American bass trombonist (born 1944)

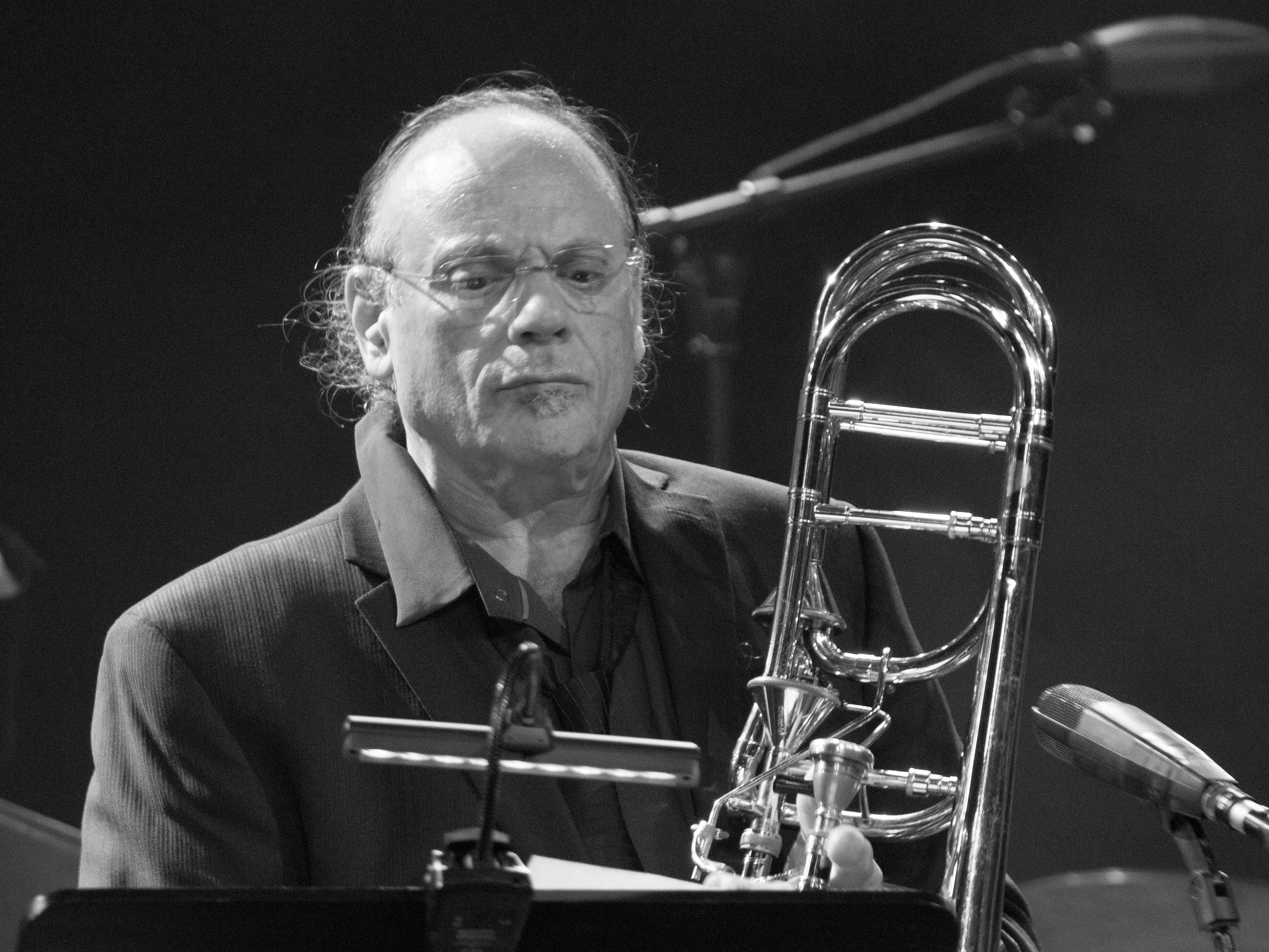

Background information
- Born: David Michael Taylor; June 6, 1944 (age 82); New York City, New York, U.S.
- Genre: Jazz
- Occupation: Musician
- Instrument: Bass trombone
- Years active: 1960s–present
- Formerly of: The Thad Jones/Mel Lewis Orchestra
- Website: davetaylor.net

Dave Taylor (born June 6, 1944) is an American bass trombonist.

== Early life and education ==
David Michael Taylor was born on June 6, 1944, in New York City. Taylor learned to play trumpet, tuba, and trombone in his youth, and while attending the Juilliard School picked up bass trombone, which became his primary instrument. He graduated with a master's degree from Juilliard in 1968.

== Career ==
Taylor was a trombonist in the American Symphony Orchestra in the late 1960s under the direction of Leopold Stokowski and began playing as a studio musician during this time. In jazz, he worked with the Thad Jones/Mel Lewis Orchestra, Chuck Israels, George Russell, and Larry Elgart in the 1970s, and in the 1980s he worked with George Gruntz, Bob Mintzer, Ray Anderson, Jim Pugh, Gil Evans and Duke Ellington in his album New Orleans Suite. He began teaching at the Manhattan School of Music in 1989 and the Mannes School of Music in 1991. Taylor worked in the 1990s with Frank Lacy, Paul Smoker, John Clark, Daniel Schnyder, and Kenny Drew Jr. He has also played in formal music idioms, including a 1984 recital at Carnegie Hall and with the Chamber Orchestra of New York and the Chamber Music Society of Lincoln Center.

== Discography ==
=== As leader ===
- The Pugh-Taylor Project with Jim Pugh (DMP, 1984)
- Bass Trombone (Triple Letter Brand, 1985)
- Past Tells (New World, 1993)
- Doppelganger (CIMP, 2002)
- Hymns, Hums, Hiss and Herz (PAO, 2004)
- Morning Moon (CIMP, 2004)
- Not Just... (CIMP, 2005)
- Red Sea (Tzadik, 2009)

With Manhattan Jazz Orchestra

- Moanin (Paddle Wheel, 1989)
- Les Liaisons Dangereuses (Sweet Basil, 1992)
- A Night in Tunisia (Sweet Basil, 1993)
- Get It On (Sweet Basil, 1995)
- Paint It Black (Sweet Basil, 1996)
- Black Magic Woman (Sweet Basil, 1997)
- Hey Duke! (Videoarts Music, 1999)
- Some Skunk Funk (Videoarts Music, 2002)
- Birdland (Videoarts Music, 2004)
- Swing, Swing, Swing (Videoarts Music, 2006)

=== As sideman ===
With Gato Barbieri

- Caliente! (A&M, 1976)
- Ruby, Ruby (A&M, 1977)

With Carla Bley

- Night-glo (WATT/ECM, 1985)
- Looking for America (WATT/ECM, 2003)

With Michel Camilo

- One More Once (Columbia, 1994)
- Caribe (Calle 54, 2009)
- Essence (Redondo Music, 2019)

With Charlie Calello

- Calello Serenade (Midsong, 1979)
- Sing, Sing, Sing & in the Mood (EMI, 1979)

With John Clark

- Il Suono (CMP, 1993)
- I Will (Postcards, 1997)

With Stanley Clarke

- Stanley Clarke (Nemperor, 1974)
- Journey to Love (Nemperor, 1975)
- School Days (Epic, 1991)

With Linda Eder

- It's Time (Atlantic, 1997)
- Broadway My Way (Atlantic, 2003)

With Maynard Ferguson

- Primal Scream (Columbia, 1976)
- Conquistador (Columbia, 1977)
- New Vintage (Columbia, 1977)

With Eric Gale

- Ginseng Woman (Columbia, 1977)
- Multiplication (Columbia, 1977)
- Part of You (Columbia, 1979)

With Michael Gibbs

- In the Public Interest (Polydor, 1974)
- Big Music (Venture, 1988)
- Nonsequence (Provocateur, 2001)

With Jimmy McGriff

- Red Beans (Groove Merchant, 1976)
- Tailgunner (LRC, 1977)

With Vince Mendoza

- Start Here (World Pacific, 1990)
- Instructions Inside (Manhattan, 1991)

With Gloria Gaynor

- Experience (MGM, 1975)
- I've Got You (Polydor, 1976)

With George Gruntz

- Live '82 (AMIGA, 1983)
- Theatre (ECM, 1984)
- Happening Now! (hat ART, 1988)
- Blues 'n' Dues (Enja, 1991)
- Beyond Another Wall (TCB, 1994)
- Sins'n Wins'n Funs Left-cores and Hard-core En-cores (TCB, 1996)

With Terumasa Hino

- Daydream (Flying Disk, 1980)
- Pyramid (CBS/Sony, 1982)

With Buddy Rich

- No Jive (Novus, 1992)
- Speak No Evil (RCA Victor, 1976)

With Rupert Holmes

- Widescreen (Epic, 1974)
- Rupert Holmes (Epic, 1975)
- Partners in Crime (Infinity, 1979)

With Bob James

- Three (CTI, 1976)
- Heads (Tappan Zee/Columbia, 1977)
- Lucky Seven (Tappan Zee/Columbia, 1979)
- Sign of the Times (CBS, 1981)
- Hands Down (Tappan Zee, 1982)
- 12 (Tappan Zee/Columbia, 1984)

With Thad Jones & Mel Lewis

- Suite for Pops (A&M/Horizon, 1975)
- New Life (A&M/Horizon, 1976)

With Earl Klugh

- Crazy for You (Liberty, 1981)
- Whispers and Promises (Warner Bros., 1989)

With Mingus Big Band

- Live in Time (Dreyfus, 1996)
- Que Viva Mingus! (Dreyfus, 1997)
- Blues & Politics (Dreyfus, 1999)
- Mingus Big Band 93 Nostalgia in Times Square (Dreyfus, 1993)
- Tonight at Noon...Three or Four Shades of Love (Dreyfus, 2002)

With Bob Mintzer

- Papa Lips (CBS/Sony, 1983)
- Incredible Journey (DMP, 1985)
- Camouflage (DMP, 1986)
- Spectrum (DMP, 1988)
- Urban Contours (DMP, 1989)
- Art of the Big Band (DMP, 1991)
- Departure (DMP, 1993)
- Only in New York (DMP, 1994)
- Big Band Trane (DMP, 1996)
- Live at the Berlin Jazz Festival (Basic, 1996)
- Latin from Manhattan (DMP, 1998)
- Homage to Count Basie (DMP, 2000)
- Gently (DMP, 2002)
- Live at MCG with Special Guest Kurt Elling (MCG, 2004)
- Old School: New Lessons (MCG, 2006)
- Swing Out (MCG, 2008)
- Get Up! (MCG, 2015)

With Jaco Pastorius

- Word of Mouth (Warner Bros., 1981)
- Truth, Liberty, & Soul (Resonance, 2017)

With Lonnie Smith

- Keep on Lovin' (Groove Merchant, 1976)
- Funk Reaction (LRC, 1977)

With Stanley Turrentine

- Nightwings (Fantasy, 1977)
- West Side Highway (Fantasy, 1978)

With John Tropea

- Tropea (Marlin, 1975)
- Short Trip to Space (Marlin, 1977)
- To Touch You Again (Marlin, 1979)

With Charles Wuorinen

- Five; Archangel; Archaeopteryx; Hyperion (Koch, 1992)
- Trios (Koch, 1993)
- Genesis Mass (Koch, 1995)
- Archaeopterix (Albany, 2008)

With others

- Jan Akkerman, Jan Akkerman 3 (Atlantic, 1979)
- Joseph Alessi, Principal Trombone, New York Philharmonic (Cala Artists, 1997)
- Tori Amos, Midwinter Graces (Universal Republic, 2008)
- Ray Anderson, Big Band Record (Gramavision, 1994)
- Ashford & Simpson, A Musical Affair (Warner Bros., 1980)
- Graham Ashton, Plays the Music of James Pugh and Daniel Schnyder (Signum, 2003)
- Louie Bellson, Airmail Special (Musicmasters, 1990)
- George Benson, 20 & 20 (Warner Bros., 1985)
- Terence Blanchard, Clockers (Columbia, 1995)
- Blood, Sweat & Tears, More Than Ever (Columbia, 1976)
- Angela Bofill, Angel of the Night (Arista GRP 1979)
- Luiz Bonfa, Manhattan Strut (Paddle Wheel, 1997)
- Brecker Brothers, Don't Stop the Music (Arista, 1977)
- Randy Brecker, Into the Sun (Sweeca, 1996)
- Elkie Brooks, Two Days Away (A&M, 1977)
- Hiram Bullock, Give It What U Got (Atlantic, 1987)
- Carter Burwell, The Chamber (Varese Sarabande, 1996)
- David Byrne, Rei Momo (Warner Bros., 1989)
- Shawn Colvin, Holiday Songs and Lullabies (Columbia, 1998)
- Elvis Costello, North (Deutsche Grammophon, 2003)
- Paquito D'Rivera, Portraits of Cuba (Chesky, 1996)
- Paquito D'Rivera, Habanera (Enja, 2000)
- Michael Davis, Absolute Trombone (Hip-Bone Music, 1997)
- Canadian Brass, Noel (RCA Victor, 1994)
- David Chesky, Rush Hour (Columbia, 1980)
- Hank Crawford, Don't You Worry 'Bout a Thing (Kudu, 1974)
- Hank Crawford, I Hear a Symphony (Kudu, 1975)
- Larry Elgart, Flight of the Condor (RCA Victor, 1981)
- Duke Ellington, New Orleans Suite (Atlantic, 1971)
- Gil Evans, Bud and Bird (King, 1987)
- Jon Faddis, Good and Plenty (Buddah, 1979)
- Fania All Stars, Rhythm Machine (Columbia, 1977)
- Joe Farrell, La Catedral y El Toro (Warner Bros., 1977)
- John Fedchock, On the Edge (Reservoir, 1997)
- Carlos Franzetti, Images Before Dawn (Premier, 1995)
- Elliot Goldenthal, Elliot Goldenthal: Othello Symphony (Zarathustra Music, 2014)
- Micki Grant, Lovin' Kind of Woman (Mercury, 1973)
- Dave Grusin, Dave Grusin Presents West Side Story (N2K Encoded Music, 1997)
- John Hollenbeck, No Images (CRI, 2001)
- Julius Hemphill, Julius Hemphill Big Band (Elektra Musician, 1988)
- Lena Horne, Lena Horne: the Lady and Her Music (Qwest, 1981)
- Jim Hall, Youkali (CTI, 1992)
- Slide Hampton, Spirit of the Horn (MCG, 2002)
- Joe Henderson, Big Band (Verve, 1996)
- Jennifer Holliday, Say You Love Me (Geffen, 1985)
- Gerry Hemingway, Chamber Works (Tzadik, 1999)
- Chris Hinze, Bamboo Magic (Atlantic, 1978)
- Cissy Houston, Cissy Houston (Private Stock, 1977)
- Freddie Hubbard, Windjammer (Columbia, 1976)
- Joe Jackson, Will Power (A&M, 1987)
- Peter Jarvis and Friends, Volume 3, 2019
- Elton John and Tim Rice, Aida (Rocket, 1999)
- J. J. Johnson, The Brass Orchestra (Verve, 1997)
- Hubert Laws, Romeo & Juliet (Columbia, 1976)
- Webster Lewis, On the Town (Epic, 1976)
- Peter Lieberson, King Gesar (Sony, 1996)
- Trini Lopez, Transformed by Time (Roulette, 1978)
- Joe Lovano, Rush Hour (Blue Note, 1995)
- Darlene Love, Introducing Darlene Love (Columbia, 2015)
- Chuck Mangione, Main Squeeze (A&M, 1976)
- The Manhattan Transfer, Pastiche (Atlantic, 1978)
- Herbie Mann, Brazil Once Again (Atlantic, 1978)
- Wynton Marsalis, A Fiddler's Tale (Sony, 1999)
- Paul Mauriat, Overseas Call (Philips, 1978)
- Lyle Mays, Street Dreams (Geffen, 1988)
- Helen Merrill, Gil Evans Collaboration (EmArcy 1988)
- Pat Metheny, Secret Story (Geffen, 1992)
- Barry Miles, Magic Theater (London, 1975)
- Jane Monheit, Taking a Chance On Love (Sony, 2004)
- Bob Moses, The Story of Moses (Gramavision, 1987)
- Mostly Other People Do the Killing, Red Hot (Hot Cup, 2012)
- Mostly Other People Do the Killing, Loafer's Hollow (Hot Cup, 2017)
- Gerry Mulligan, Dragonfly (Telarc, 1995)
- Walter Murphy, Rhapsody in Blue (Private Stock, 1977)
- New York Voices, Sing! Sing! Sing! (Concord Jazz, 2001)
- The O'Jays, Emotionally Yours (EMI, 1991)
- Donny Osmond, This Is the Moment (Decca, 2001)
- Parliament, Trombipulation (Casablanca, 1980)
- Noel Pointer, Feel It Soul (Music.com, 2012)
- Tito Puente, Tito Puente and His Concert Orchestra (Tico, 1973)
- Ray, Goodman & Brown, Stay (Polydor, 1981)
- Lou Reed, Sally Can't Dance (RCA Victor, 1974)
- Rufus Reid, Quiet Pride (Motema, 2013)
- Hank Roberts, Black Pastels (JMT, 1988)
- Herb Robertson, Certified (JMT, 1991)
- Joe Roccisano, Leave Your Mind Behind (Landmark, 1995)
- Jess Roden, Stonechaser (Island, 1980)
- George Russell, New York Big Band (Soul Note, 1982)
- Daniel Schnyder, Tarantula (Enja, 1996)
- Daniel Schnyder, Words Within Music (Enja, 1999)
- Masahiko Satoh, All-in All-Out (Openskye, 1979)
- Ken Schaphorst, Purple (Naxos, 1998)
- Lalo Schifrin, Black Widow (CTI, 1976)
- Martin Schlumpf, Streams (Navona, 2013)
- Frank Sinatra, L.A. Is My Lady (Qwest, 1984)
- Paul Smoker, Brass Reality (Nine Winds, 2002)
- Phoebe Snow, Never Letting Go (Sony, 2011)
- Candi Staton, Candi Staton (Warner Bros., 1980)
- Jeremy Steig, Firefly (CTI, 1977)
- Michael Jefry Stevens, Brass Tactics (Konnex, 2016)
- Steve Swell, Double Diploid (CIMP, 2006)
- Tom Talbert, This Is Living! Pipe Dream (Chartmaker, 1997)
- Kate Taylor, Kate Taylor (Columbia, 1978)
- Diane Tell, Chimeres (Polydor, 1982)
- Domenic Troiano, Burnin' at the Stake (Capitol, 1977)
- Tina Turner, Love Explosion (United Artists, 1979)
- Bonnie Tyler, Holding Out for a Hero (CBS/Sony, 1984)
- Steve Tyrell, This Guy's in Love (Columbia, 2003)
- Frankie Valli, Closeup (Private Stock, 1975)
- Luther Vandross, Forever, for Always, for Love (Epic, 1982)
- Thijs van Leer, Nice to Have Met You (CBS, 1978)
- Tom Varner, The Mystery of Compassion (Soul Note, 1993)
- Harold Vick, After the Dance (Wolf, 1977)
- Georg Wadenius, Left Turn from the Right Lane (Gazell, 2001)
- Grover Washington Jr., Feels So Good (Kudu, 1975)
- Loudon Wainwright III, T Shirt (Arista, 1976)
- Johnny Winter, John Dawson Winter III (Columbia, 1974)
- Phil Woods, The New Phil Woods Album (RCA Victor, 1976)
- Akiko Yano, Love Life (Nonesuch, 1993)
- Michael Zager, Let's All Chant (Private Stock, 1978)
- John Zorn, The Satyr's Play/Cerberus (Tzadik, 2011)
