= Theatre (album) =

Studio album by George Gruntz Concert Jazz Band '83
- Released: 1984
- Recorded: July 1983
- Studios: Tonstudio Bauer; Ludwigsburg, West Germany
- Genre: Jazz
- Length: 56:26
- Label: ECM 1265
- Producer: Manfred Eicher

George Gruntz chronology
Live '82 (1982)	Theatre (1984)	Living Transition (1988)

Theatre is an album by George Gruntz's Concert Jazz Band '83 recorded in July 1983 and released on ECM the following year.

== Reception ==
The AllMusic review by Scott Yanow awarded the album 2½ stars stating "the music overall is for selective tastes and it never really seems to flow, making it of limited interest."

Professional ratings
Review scores
Source	Rating
AllMusic	2.5/5 stars

== Track listing ==
All compositions by George Gruntz except as indicated

1. "El Chancho" (Dino Saluzzi) - 15:18
2. "In the Tradition of Switzerland" - 9:21
3. "No One Can Explain It" - 6:27
4. "The Holy Grail of Jazz and Joy" - 25:20

== Personnel ==
=== George Gruntz's Concert Jazz Band '83 ===
- George Gruntz – keyboards
- Marcus Belgrave – trumpet
- Tom Harrell – trumpet, flugelhorn
- Palle Mikkelborg – trumpet
- Bill Pusey – trumpet, flugelhorn
- Julian Priester – trombone
- Dave Bargeron – trombone, euphonium
- Dave Taylor – bass trombone
- Peter Gordon – French horn
- Tom Varner – French horn
- Howard Johnson – tuba, bass clarinet, baritone saxophone
- Charlie Mariano – alto and soprano saxophones, flute
- Ernst-Ludwig Petrowsky – alto and soprano saxophones, clarinet
- Seppo Paakkunainen – tenor saxophone, flute
- Dino Saluzzi – bandoneon
- Mark Egan – bass guitar
- Bob Moses – drums
- Sheila Jordan – vocals
