= Martin Kunzler =

German music journalist

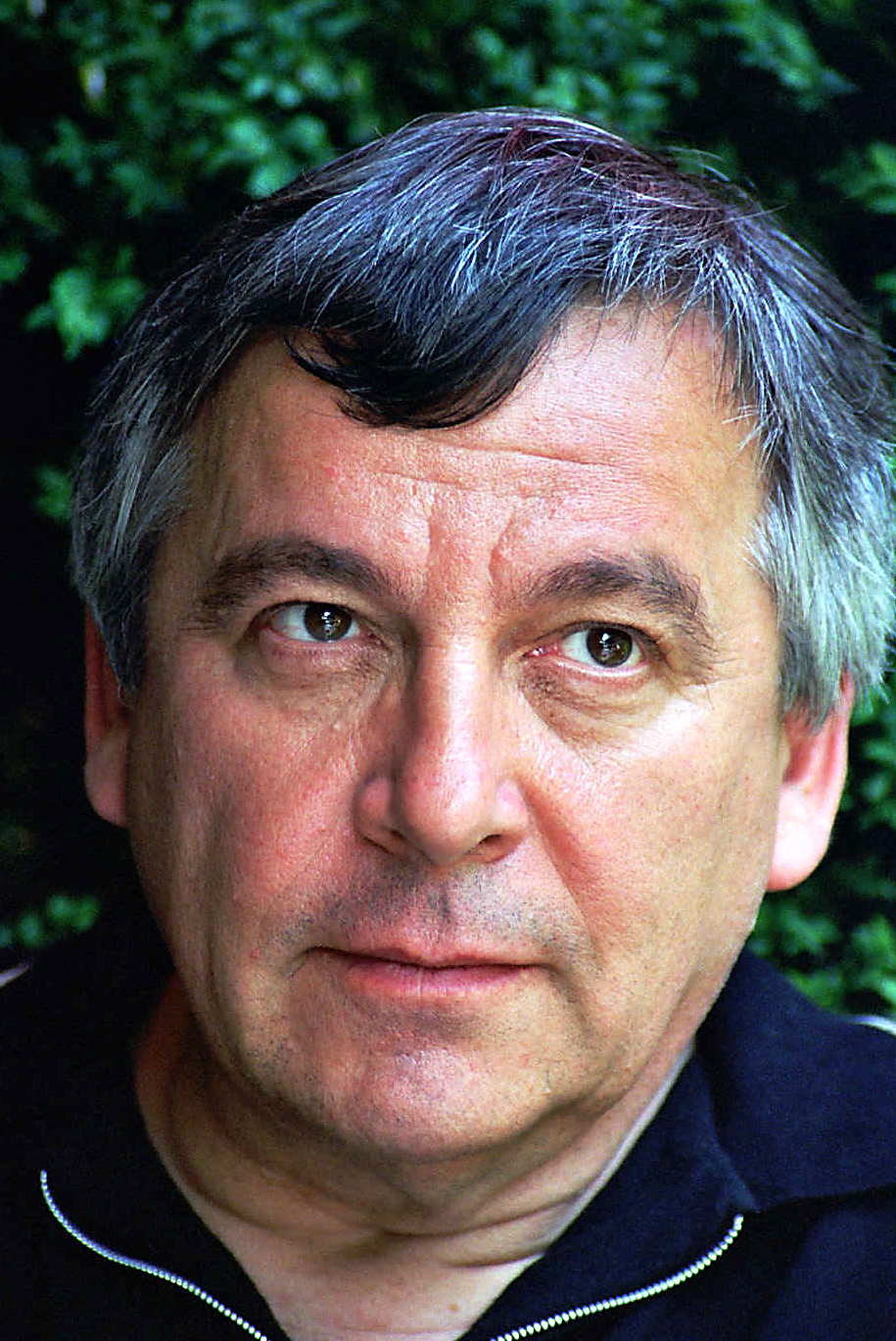
Martin Kunzler

Martin Kunzler (born 29 April 1947) is a German jazz bassist and music journalist. He gained particular fame through his rororo Jazz-Lexikon published by Rowohlt Verlag, which is now considered the standard German-language work on this musical genre.

== Life ==
Kunzler was born in Lörrach as the youngest of six siblings and went to the Hans-Thoma-Gymnasium Lörrach and the Wirtschaftsgymnasium . From 1960, he took double bass lessons with Chester Gill, and from 1964 he studied double bass with Michel Delannois as well as music theory with Gerd Watkinson in Basel. After his marriage and the birth of his son Claudio, Kunzler completed a traineeship as newspaper editor at the Verlagshaus Jaumann in Lörrach from 1966 to 1968, after which he was editor and feature correspondent of the Schwarzwälder Bote until 1969. In 1967/68, he also held a teaching position at the Pädagogische Hochschule Lörrach in the subjects Double Bass and Workshop for Neue Musik.

Kunzler was also active in avant-garde musical projects with the Tübingen ensemble of Heinz Kunzler and Wolfgang Hamm and the ensembles around Percy Gerd Watkinson. Numerous concerts and tours as a jazz musician followed, among others with Oscar Klein, Raymond Droz, Ewald Heidepriem, Hans Deyssenroth, Phil Woods, Lee Konitz, Albert Nicholas, Milt Buckner, Attila Zoller, Stu Martin, Jean-Louis Chautemps, Pony Poindexter and above all for many years with the American arranger Bob Carter.

From 1970 to 1972, Kunzler was head of the feature section of the Westfalen-Blatt in Bielefeld; during this time he also published his first book as co-author alongside Bernhard Conz with the title Gerettet auf dem Steinway-Flügel. After an interlude at the Badische Zeitung in Freiburg im Breisgau, in 1973 he took over the PR department of BASF Records Musikproduktion in Hamburg and later in Mannheim. There he mainly looked after the record labels Harmonia Mundi and Musik Produktion Schwarzwald, one specialising in early music and the other in jazz.

Kunzler also worked as a producer, not in jazz but in the classical field (and there mainly as a specialist for modern and early music). As an editor, he has designed many projects in this field; important permanent partners were Carl Orff, Gary Bertini, Ireneu Segarra i Malla and Peter Michael Hamel.

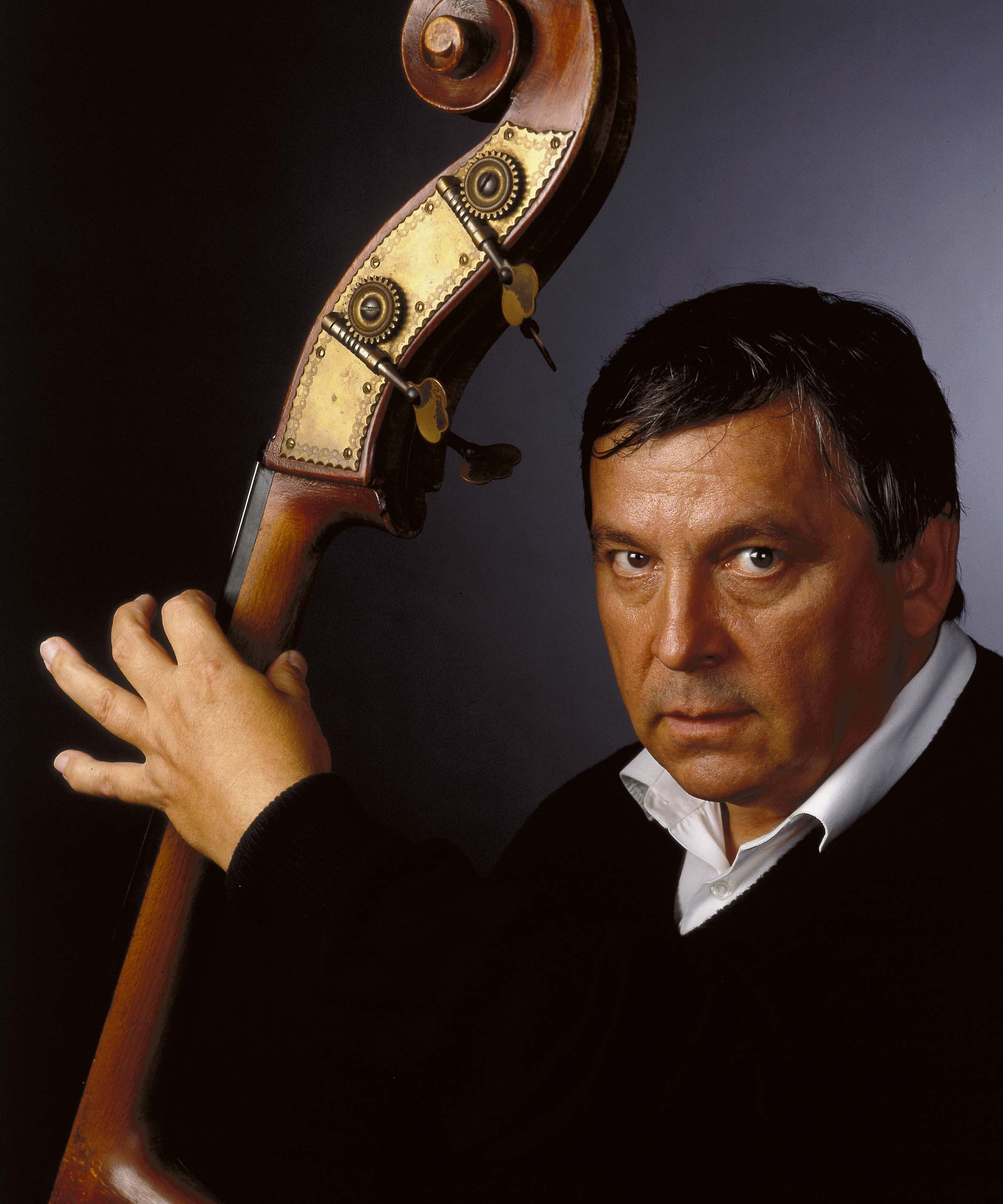
Martin Kunzler with Kontrabass

After BASF's withdrawal from the music business in 1976, he worked as a freelancer for record companies such as Deutsche Grammophon (Production archive), EMI, Wergo, Teldec (The Old Work) or Bellaphon, WDR, ORF and the Deutsche Welle, Schott Music and newspapers or magazines such as the Neue Musikzeitung (nmz, Bosse Verlag), Das Orchester, Melos, Musica, Musik und Bildung, Fonoforum, Stereo, Disk (Holland), the Deutsches Allgemeines Sonntagsblatt, numerous daily newspapers and popular magazines up to Playboy.

In 1977 he joined the Boehringer Mannheim as press spokesman, (later Roche Diagnostics), but retained his freelance activities as author and producer. From 1980 onwards, his work for the first edition of the Rowohlt-Jazzlexikon moved into the foreground. It was published in 1988, followed by various supplemented or unchanged new editions and a completely revised new version in 2002.

Kunzler also collaborates to the Neue Deutsche Biographie of the Bavarian Academy of Sciences. He has also been active in the field of museums, including essayistic contributions for exhibition catalogues and, in 2002, marketing for a major Jean Tinguely retrospective at the Kunsthalle Mannheim.

== Work ==
- Gerettet auf dem Steinway-Flügel. Bernhard Conz über Conz und andere. Busse Verlag, Herford 1971.
- Jazz-Lexikon. Extended new edition Rowohlt, Reinbek 2002 (digitally available via Directmedia Publishing Berlin 2006).
1. A–L. ISBN 3-499-16512-0.
2. M–Z. ISBN 3-499-16513-9.
- Wir und wie wir wohnen. Neu Heidelberg, Heidelberg 2018, ISBN 978-3-00-059153-2
