= Antonio Faraò =

Italian jazz pianist

- Born: 19 January 1965 (age 61); Rome, Italy
- Genre: Jazz
- Occupation: Musician
- Instrument: Piano
- Years active: 1990–present
- Labels: Enja, CAM Jazz, Verve
- Website: antoniofarao.net

Antonio Faraò (born 19 January 1965) is an Italian jazz pianist.

== Career ==
A native of Rome, Italy, Faraò earned a degree in 1983 from the Giuseppe Verdi Conservatory in Milan and performed in clubs as a teenager. Enja released his debut album, Black Inside, in 1999. He recorded the album with Ira Coleman and Jeff "Tain" Watts. He has worked with Bob Berg, Andre Ceccarelli, Jack DeJohnette, Manu Katche, Bireli Lagrene, Joe Lovano, and Miroslav Vitous.

== Awards ==
- 1998 1st Prize Concours International de Piano-Jazz Martial Solal (Paris)

== Discography ==
=== As leader ===
Year released	Title	Label	Personnel/Notes
1996	Expose	Dischi della Quercia	with Franco Ambrosetti, Robert Bonisolo, Rosario Bonaccorso, Tony Arco
1999	Black Inside	Enja	with Ira Coleman, Jeff Tain Watts
2000	Borderlines	Sketch	Trio, with Jean-Jacques Avenel (bass), Daniel Humair (drums)
2000	Thorn	Enja	with Jack DeJohnette, Drew Gress, Chris Potter
2002	Next Stories	Enja	with Ed Howard (bass), Gene Jackson (drums), Pibo Marquez (percussion)
2002	Far Out	CAM Jazz	Quartet, with Bob Berg (tenor sax), Martin Gjakonovski (bass), Dejan Terzic (drums)
2004	Encore	CAM Jazz	Trio, with Martin Gjakonovski (bass), Dejan Terzic (drums)
2005	Takes on Pasolini	CAM Jazz	Trio, with Miroslav Vitous (bass), Daniel Humair (drums)
2008	Woman's Perfume	CAM Jazz	Trio, with Dominique Di Piazza (electric bass), André Ceccarelli (drums)
2012	Domi	Cristal	Trio, with Darryl Hall, André Ceccarelli
2013	Evan	Cristal	with Joe Lovano, Ira Coleman, Jack DeJohnette
2015	Boundaries	Verve	with Luigi di Nunzio (alto sax), Mauro Negri (tenor sax, alto sax), Martin Gjakonovski (bass), Mauro Beggio (drums)
2017	Eklektik	Warner	with Snoop Dogg, Marcus Miller, Didier Lockwood, Bireli Lagrène, Krayzie Bone, Lenny White, Mike Clark, Manu Katché
2024	Tributes	Criss Cross Jazz	with John Patitucci and Jeff Ballard

=== As sideman ===
With Franco Ambrosetti

- Light Breeze (Enja, 1998)

With André Ceccarelli

- West Side Story (1997)

With Nicolas Folmer and Bob Mintzer

- Nicolas Folmer meets Bob Mintzer (2010)

With Giovanni Tommaso

- Secondo Tempo (2001)

With Jens Winther

- Jens Winther European Quintet (2005)

With Letizia Gambi

- Introducing Letizia Gambi (2012)
