= Raymond Court =

Swiss jazz trumpeter

Raymond Court (born December 2, 1932, Lausanne) is a Swiss jazz trumpeter.

Court began playing trumpet late in his teens and by age 20 was playing in Raymond Droz's band (1952-1956). He played later in the 1950s with Flavio Ambrosetti and Kurt Weil, and in the early 1960s with Daniel Humair, Martial Solal, and Rene Urtreger. Starting in the mid-1960s, he began concentrating on a new career in woodworking and cabinetry, but returned to music after about a decade, recording as a leader in the 1980s and with Weil again and Charly Antolini in the 1990s.
