= Live at the Blue Note (Franco Ambrosetti album) =

Live album by Franco Ambrosetti
- Released: 1993
- Recorded: July 13, 1992
- Venue: The Blue Note, NYC
- Genre: Jazz
- Length: 62:06
- Label: Enja; ENJ 7065
- Producer: Matthias Winckelmann

Franco Ambrosetti chronology
Music for Symphony and Jazz Band (1991)	Live at the Blue Note (1993)	Light Breeze (1998)

Live at the Blue Note is a live album by the flugelhornist Franco Ambrosetti which was recorded in New York in 1992 and released on the Enja label the following year.

== Reception ==
Professional ratings
Review scores
Source	Rating
AllMusic	4/5 stars

The AllMusic review by Scott Yanow called it a "Lively club date" and stated "Ambrosetti has long been able to hold his own with Americans ... The music is hard bop, and Ambrosetti comes up with fresh statements ... This is just one in a series of excellent Ambrosetti sets for Enja, all of which are easily recommended".

== Track listing ==
1. Introduction – 0:17
2. "Blues 'n' Dues Et Cetera" (George Gruntz) – 13:23
3. "Just Friends" (John Klenner, Sam M. Lewis) – 7:36
4. "Body and Soul" (Johnny Green, Frank Eyton, Edward Heyman, Robert Sour) – 12:28
5. "Phantoms" (Kenny Barron) – 18:56
6. "Voyage" (Barron) – 9:26

== Personnel ==
- Franco Ambrosetti – flugelhorn
- Seamus Blake – tenor saxophone
- Kenny Barron – piano
- Ira Coleman – bass
- Victor Lewis – drums
