= Björkstén =

Björkstén is a surname. Notable people with the surname include:

- af Björkstén, Finnish noble family
- Hacke Björksten (1934–2020), Finnish-Swedish jazz bandleader and saxophonist
- Waldemar Björkstén (1873–1933), Finnish sailor
