= Movies (Franco Ambrosetti album) =

Studio album by Franco Ambrosetti and Friends
- Released: 1987
- Recorded: November 1986
- Studio: Van Gelder Studio, Englewood Cliffs, NJ
- Genre: Jazz
- Length: 50:00
- Label: Enja; ENJ 5035
- Producer: Matthias Winckelmann

Franco Ambrosetti chronology
Tentets (1985)	Movies (1987)	Movies Too (1988)

Movies is an album by the flugelhornist and composer Franco Ambrosetti which was recorded in 1986 and released on the Enja label the following year.

The album includes music from Porgy and Bess, yellow Submarine, Round Midnight, Star Spangled Rhythm, Lady Sings the Blues, The Magnificent Seven, The Blue Angel, and one of Ambrosetti's own compositions for the film Die Reise.

== Reception ==
Professional ratings
Review scores
Source	Rating
Allmusic	4.5/5 stars

The Allmusic review by Scott Yanow stated "When one considers the repertoire -- eight songs from movies ... this recording may not seem to have much potential. But actually, the set list includes four well-known standards and all of the music is transformed into creative and consistently exciting jazz ... and the performances are generally quite memorable. Recommended".

== Track listing ==
1. "Summertime" (George Gershwin, DuBose Heyward, Ira Gershwin) – 6:35
2. "Yellow Submarine" (John Lennon, Paul McCartney) – 8:35
3. "Chan's Song (Never Said)" (Herbie Hancock, Stevie Wonder) – 6:25
4. "That Old Black Magic" (Harold Arlen, Johnny Mercer) – 3:00
5. "Good Morning Heartache" (Irene Higginbotham, Ervin Drake, and Dan Fisher) – 8:21
6. "The Magnificent Seven" (Elmer Bernstein) – 8:07
7. "Ich Bin Von Kopf Bis Fuss Auf Liebe Eingestellt (Falling in Love Again)" (Friedrich Hollaender, Sammy Lerner) – 4:04
8. "Be a Brave Utopist" (Franco Ambrosetti) – 4:52

== Personnel ==
- Franco Ambrosetti – trumpet, flugelhorn
- John Scofield – guitar
- Geri Allen – piano, synthesizer
- Michael Formanek – bass
- Daniel Humair – drums
- Jerry González – percussion
