= Close Encounter (album) =

Studio album by Franco Ambrosetti Quintet with Bennie Wallace
- Released: 1979
- Recorded: March 21, 1978
- Studios: CI Studios, NYC
- Genre: Jazz
- Length: 42:44
- Labels: Enja; ENJ 3017
- Producers: Horst Weber, Matthias Winckelmann

Franco Ambrosetti chronology
Franco Ambrosetti Quartet (1976)	Close Encounter (1979)	Sleeping Gypsy (1980)

Close Encounter is an album by the Swiss trumpeter/flugelhornist and composer Franco Ambrosetti which was recorded in 1978 and released on the Enja label the following year.

== Reception ==
Professional ratings
Review scores
Source	Rating
AllMusic	3/5 stars

The AllMusic review by Scott Yanow stated "The sometimes episodic repertoire is quite obscure and generally hard bop-oriented. Everyone plays well on this lesser-known but enjoyable effort".

== Track listing ==
All compositions by Franco Ambrosetti, except where noted.

1. "Close Encounter" – 8:22
2. "Napoleon Blown Apart" (Flavio Ambrosetti) – 5:39
3. "Sad Story of a Photographer (Someday My Prints Will Come)" — 8:12
4. "Morning Song of a Spring Flower" (George Gruntz) – 14:29
5. "Rumba Organistica" (Joachim Kühn) – 6:02

== Personnel ==
- Franco Ambrosetti – flugelhorn, trumpet
- Bennie Wallace – tenor saxophone
- George Gruntz – piano
- Mike Richmond – bass
- Bob Moses – drums
