= Spinning Songs of Herbie Nichols =

Live album by Simon Nabatov
- Released: February 2012
- Recorded: 22 September 2007
- Venue: Loft, Cologne, Germany
- Genre: Jazz
- Length: 64:21
- Label: Leo

Spinning Songs of Herbie Nichols is a solo piano album by Simon Nabatov. It was recorded in concert in 2007 and released by Leo Records.

== Recording and music ==
The album of solo piano performances by Nabatov was recorded in concert at Loft, in Cologne, on 22 September 2007. The eight pieces were all composed by pianist Herbie Nichols. "Nabatov tears down these compositions and re-engineers the various melodies and structures."

== Release and reception ==
Spinning Songs of Herbie Nichols was released by Leo Records in February 2012. The Cadence reviewer wrote: "With an abundance of complexity, Nabatov is able to sustain his overlapping lines and constantly changing harmonic colors in a way that’s never excessive or showy, and never loses the music." The Independent described the performances as "marvellously jangly, madly syncopated vamping where the bones of the originals show through."

Performances of some of the same material were subsequently released on DVD by PanRec.

== Track listing ==
1. "23 Skiddoo"
2. "The Spinning Song"
3. "Blue Chopsticks"
4. "Lady Sings the Blues"
5. "Sunday Stroll"
6. "The Third World"
7. "Terpsichore"
8. "Twelve Bars"

== Personnel ==
- Simon Nabatov – piano
