= David Buzzi =

Davide Buzzi
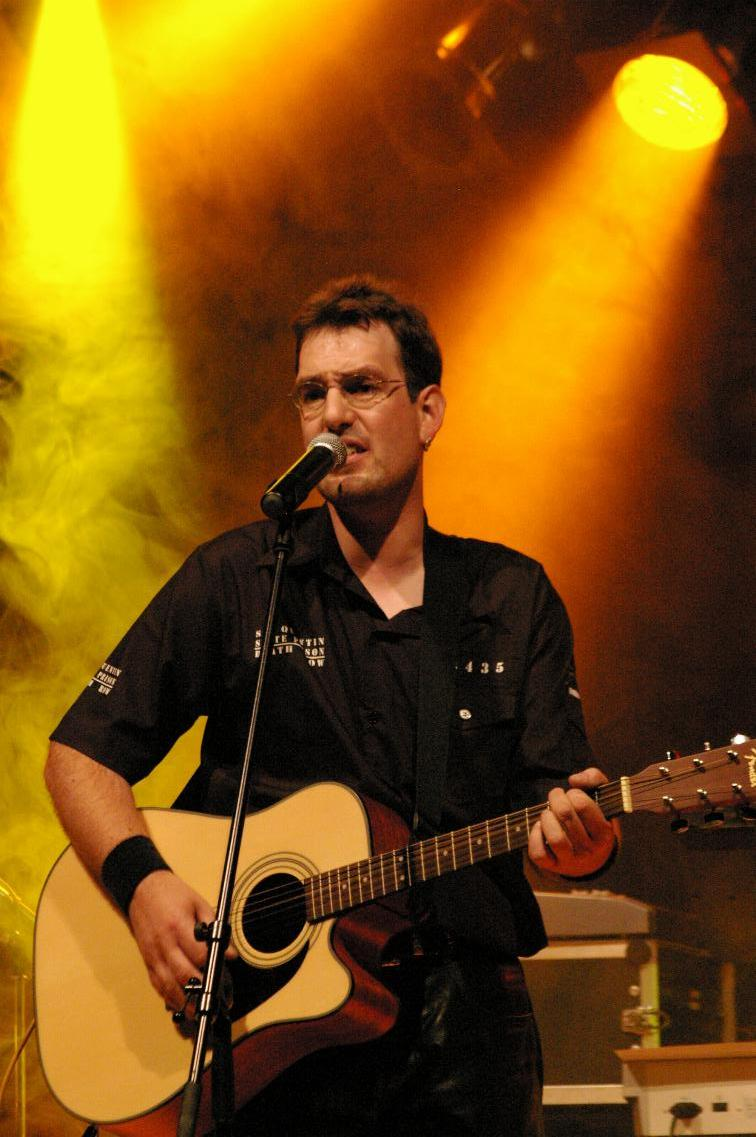
- Davide Buzzi in concert

Background information
- Born: Davide Buzzi; 31 December 1968 (age 57)
- Origin: Blenio, Canton Ticino, Switzerland
- Genres: folk rock, italian pop/rock, heartland rock, alternative rock
- Occupations: Singer-songwriter, musician, art director, producer
- Instruments: Vocals, guitar,
- Years active: Since 1991
- Labels: Pyramide, SELF, PBR, IRD, Pony
- Website: davidebuzzi.com

Davide Buzzi (David Buzzi; born 31 December 1968) is a Swiss singer-songwriter and a part of the Swiss Italian scene.

== Biography ==
Davide Buzzi was born on 31 December 1968 in Acquarossa, Switzerland. He is originally from the former municipality of Aquila, in the canton of Ticino. A photographer, he is also holds a degree in marketing and management and has worked in the public security and insurance sector, until he concentrated his activity only in the artistic branch.

Suffering from pain since 2000, he was finally diagnosed in 2012 with a gastrointestinal tumour, which forced him to take medication for the rest of his life. Divorced and the father of two daughters, he lives in Acquarossa, in the canton of Ticino.

== Artistic path ==
Author of his own lyrics, Davide Buzzi is known for his songs on social and historical themes, in Italian and Ticino dialect. From 1993 to 2022, he recorded five albums. He has given concerts in Switzerland, Sweden, Italy, France, Albania and other European countries, also working with many well-known musicians, including the Finnish rock band Leningrad Cowboys. In 1998, he won the Lissone Festival (Italy), Cantem Insemma, with the song Ul veget di Mariunètt and received the special prize for the best text and music.

In 1997, he received the international award Targa Città di Milano (Italy), in 2000, he received the international award Premio Città di San Bonifacio (Italy), and in 2002, in Sanremo (Italy), he received the international award Myrta Gabardi.

In 2012 and 2013, he received two nominations for the ISMA Awards in Milwaukee and a nomination for the Nammy Awards in Niagara Falls, for the song The She Wolf.

His novel L'estate di Achille is nominated for the Premio Strega 2023.

He wrote songs for Italian, American and Australian performers.

== Discography ==
- 1993 : Da grande
- 1998 : Il Diavolo Rosso
- 2006 : Perdo i pezzi
- 2016 : Romaneschi (single)
- 2017 : Te ne vai (single)
- 2017 : Non ascoltare in caso d'incendio (Album)
- 2020 : Don't cross the rails (single)
- 2021 : Come stai? (single)
- 2021 : americanfly.chat, with Franco Ambrosetti (single)
- 2021 : Radiazioni sonore artificiali non coerenti (Album)
- 2023 : La lupa, with Franco Ambrosetti (single)

=== Duets ===
- With Leningrad Cowboys: Gringo (original title "Ten lost gringos")
- With Leandro Barsotti: La borsa degli scudi
- With Massimo Priviero: Nessuna resa mai
- With Yolanda Martinez: Il ponte (The bridge)
- With Massimo Priviero: Salvatore Fiumara
- With Dario Gay: Non ti scordare di me
- With Franco Ambrosetti: americanfly.chat
- With Franco Ambrosetti: La lupa

== Books ==
- 2013 : Il mio nome è Leponte... Johnny Leponte (96, Rue de-La-Fontaine Edizioni)
- 2017 : La multa (ARBOK / ANA Edizioni)
- 2020 : Antonio Scalonesi - Memoriale di un anomalo omicida seriale (96, Rue de-La-Fontaine Edizioni)
- 2022 : L'estate di Achille (Morellini Editore)

== Filmography ==
- 1982 – L'oro nel camino, directed by Nelo Risi
- 1995 – Romaneschi, directed by Bruno Soldini
- 2018 – Non ascoltare in caso d'incendio, directed by Dimitris Statiris
- 2020 - Memoriale di un anomalo omicida seriale de Elia Andrioletti (Scénariste)

== Sources ==
- "Davide Buzzi". rsi intrattenimento.
- "Davide Buzzi". rsi cultura.
- "Davide Buzzi". rsi ilquotidiano.
- "Davide Buzzi". la nostra storia.
- "Davide Buzzi". l'idea magazine.
- "Davide Buzzi". CdT-Corriere del Ticino.
- "Davide Buzzi". La Regione.
- "Davide Buzzi". Scetticamente.
- Giaccardi, Chiara; Manzato, Anna; Simonelli, Giorgio (1998). Davide Buzzi. FrancoAngeli. ISBN 9788846407344.
