= Tailgunner (album) =

Studio album by Jimmy McGriff
- Released: 1977
- Recorded: May 1977
- Studio: Mediasound (New York City); A&R (New York City); ODO Sound Studios
- Genre: Jazz
- Length: 35:26
- Label: Lester Radio Corp. (LRC); LRC-9316
- Producer: Sonny Lester

Jimmy McGriff chronology
Red Beans (1976)	Tailgunner (1977)	Outside Looking In (1978)

Tailgunner is an album by organist Jimmy McGriff recorded in 1977 and released on the Lester Radio Corp. (LRC) label.

== Reception ==
Professional ratings
Review scores
Source	Rating
Allmusic	3/5 stars

Doug Payne stated: "This 1977 disco production sounds like Jimmy McGriff was added as an afterthought. His distinctive organ fills seem "dropped in" after arrangers Brad Baker and Lance Quinn recorded the rhythm, horn and string sections. Worse, this is some of the weakest music McGriff has ever participated in ... McGriff's only contribution here, the horn-driven "Starlite Ballroom" (featuring notable alto and tenor solos from George Young), makes for some welcome, though out-of-place swing jazz. Otherwise, there's too little that's memorable about Tailgunner.

== Track listing ==
All compositions by Brad Baker and Lance Quinn except where noted

1. "Tailgunner" – 5:38
2. "Bullfrog" (Jerry Friedman) – 5:45
3. "Sky Hawk" – 5:58
4. "Flexible Flyer" – 6:09
5. "Grandma's Toe Jam" – 6:09
6. "Starlite Ballroom, Hot Licks Band Stomp" (Jimmy McGriff) – 5:47

== Personnel ==
- Jimmy McGriff – organ
- Lance Quinn – guitar, musical supervisor
- Brad Baker – conductor
- Collective personnel including:
  - Lew Delgatto, Eddie Daniels, George Young, Alan Rubin, Randy Brecker, John Frosk, Marvin Stamm, John Sheply, Dave Taylor, Barry Rogers, Dominic Menardo, Joe Randazzo – horns
  - Pat Rebillot, Paul Griffin, Ralph Schuckett – keyboards
  - Jerry Friedman, Jimmy Ponder – guitar
  - Bob Babbitt, Will Lee, Francisco Centano – bass
  - Alan Schwartzberg, Jimmy Young, Ron Zito − drums
  - Jimmy Maelen, Rubens Bassini – percussion
  - Al Downing, Denise Wooten, Patricia Johnson – vocals
  - Gene Orloff, Paul Gerhsman, Guy Lumia, W. Sanford Allen, Harry Lookofsky, Gerald Tarack, Tony Posk, Julian Barber, Richard Maximoff, Jesse Levy, Richard Locker – strings
