= Around Brazil =

Studio album by Simon Nabatov
- Released: 26 May 2006
- Recorded: September 2005
- Studio: Rainbow Studio, Oslo; Cologne
- Genre: Jazz
- Length: 68:57
- Label: ACT
- Producer: Siegfried Loch

Around Brazil is a solo piano album by Simon Nabatov. It was recorded in 2005 and released by ACT Music.

== Recording and music ==
The album of solo piano performances by Nabatov was recorded in September 2005. All of the tracks were recorded at the Rainbow Studio in Oslo, except for "Partita de Março", which was recorded in Cologne. The album was produced by Siegfried Loch.

Nabatov plays prepared piano on "Depois que o Ilê passar". "Valsa de Pôrto Das Caixas" is a delicate waltz by Antônio Carlos Jobim. On "Partita de Março", the formal theme gradually emerges, "almost like the sculptor finding the form that is already present in the uncut stone." It quotes Jobim's "Waters of March" and Bach.

== Release and reception ==
Professional ratings
Review scores
Source	Rating
The Penguin Guide to Jazz Recordings	4/4 stars

Around Brazil was released in Germany by ACT Music on 26 May 2006. It was the fifth in their Piano Works series. The Penguin Guide to Jazz described it as "a quite extraordinary essay in modern pianism [...] he takes each piece out into areas of creative improvisation that no one else would have thought of". They also highlighted the extreme separation of bass and treble in the recording. The MusicWeb reviewer wrote that, "If you care about good jazz – or good music of any kind – you need to buy this CD."

== Track listing ==
1. "Desde que o samba é samba" (Caetano Veloso)
2. "Estrada do Sol" (Antônio Carlos Jobim)
3. "Partita de Março" (Simon Nabatov)
4. "Nenê" (Ernesto Nazareth)
5. "Eu vim da Bahia" (Gilberto Gil)
6. "Depois que o Ilê passar" (Miltao)
7. "Na Baixa do Sapateiro" (Ary Barroso)
8. "My Sertão" (Nabatov)
9. "Valsa de Pôrto Das Caixas" (Jobim)
10. "Qualquer coisa" (Veloso)
11. "Você é linda"(Veloso)

== Personnel ==
- Simon Nabatov – piano
