= Monk 'n' More =

Recording by Simon Nabatov
- Released: October 2016
- Recorded: May 1995, June 2013
- Genre: Jazz
- Label: Leo

Monk 'n' More is an album by Simon Nabatov. It was recorded in May 1995 and June 2013 and was released by Leo Records.

== Recording and music ==
The album contains ten tracks. Five are solo piano pieces composed by Thelonious Monk and recorded at Loft, in Cologne, in May 1995. The other five are Nabatov compositions that he performed on piano and electronics in concert at Loft in June 2013. This use of electronics came from a collaboration in April 2013 between Nabatov and composer Hans Koch.

== Release and reception ==
Monk 'n' More was released by Leo Records in October 2016. The Cadence reviewer described it as "A fine set of outings that stands up well on repeated listens."

== Track listing ==
1. "Skippy"
2. "Electroacoustic Extension 1"
3. "Oska T."
4. "Electroacoustic Extension 2"
5. "Pannonica"
6. "Electroacoustic Extension 3"
7. "Light Blue"
8. "Electroacoustic Extension 4"
9. "Sunrise Twice Redux"
10. "Epistrophy"

== Personnel ==
- Simon Nabatov – piano
