= Mock-Lo-Motion =

Live album by George Gruntz Trio
- Released: 1995
- Recorded: May 7 & 13, 1995
- Venue: A-Trane in Berlin and Chorus in Lausanne, Germany
- Genre: Jazz
- Length: 57:39
- Label: TCB; TCB 95552
- Producer: TCB Music

George Gruntz chronology
Big Band Record (1994)	Mock-Lo-Motion (1995)	Sins'n Wins'n Funs (1996)

Mock-Lo-Motion is a live album by pianist and composer George Gruntz's Trio with special guest trumpeter Franco Ambrosetti which was recorded in Germany in 1995 and released on the TCB label.

== Reception ==
Professional ratings
Review scores
Source	Rating
Allmusic	4/5 stars

The Allmusic review by Scott Yanow stated "Gruntz has an original piano style within the modern mainstream of jazz, with his own fresh chord voicings ... A fine effort".

== Track listing ==
All compositions by George Gruntz except where noted

1. "Mock-Lo-Motion" – 10:34
2. "You Should Know By Now" – 9:55
3. "One for Kids" – 8:36
4. "Annalisa" (Franco Ambrosetti) – 11:58
5. "Giuseppi's Blues" (Mike Richmond) – 5:16
6. "Vodka-Pentatonic" (Ambrosetti) – 11:20

== Personnel ==
- George Gruntz – piano
- Franco Ambrosetti – flugelhorn (tracks 2, 4 & 6)
- Mike Richmond – bass
- Adam Nussbaum – drums
