= Perpetuum Immobile =

Live album by Simon Nabatov
- Released: January 2002
- Recorded: 26 November 2000
- Venue: Loft, Cologne, Germany
- Genre: Jazz
- Label: Leo
- Producer: Simon Nabatov, Leo Feigin

Perpetuum Immobile is a solo piano album by Simon Nabatov. It was recorded in concert in 2000 and released by Leo Records.

== Recording and music ==
The album of solo piano performances by Nabatov was recorded in concert at Loft, in Cologne, on 26 November 2000. The producers were Nabatov and Leo Feigin. All of the nine tracks were written by Nabatov. The pianist plays "One-handed Bandit" with his right hand only.

== Release and reception ==
Professional ratings
Review scores
Source	Rating
AllMusic	4/5 stars
The Penguin Guide to Jazz	4/4 stars

Perpetuum Immobile was released by Leo Records in January 2002. The Penguin Guide to Jazz wrote that "The influences on this solo recital come from the entire modern classical canon, and quite explicitly so." The AllMusic reviewer wrote: "Nabatov's solo piano work is entirely different than his ensemble recordings: Alone, he displays a strong romantic side that can be alternately dark and brooding or vigorously upbeat. His use of the pedals adds an atmospheric element that never devolves to mawkishness, but instead embraces life."

== Track listing ==
1. "Which Way Up?" – 7:21
2. "In Motion" – 5:57
3. "Chordal" – 6:16
4. "Flow Chart" – 4:57
5. "Negative Transparency" – 6:43
6. "Polymorphous Perverse" – 6:19
7. "One-handed Bandit" – 4:58
8. "U-trillo" – 8:24
9. "Positive Transparency" – 6:34

== Personnel ==
- Simon Nabatov – piano
