= Music for Symphony and Jazz Band =

Studio album by Franco Ambrosetti
- Released: 1991
- Recorded: October 1–6, 1990
- Studio: NDR Studio, Hannover, Germany
- Genre: Jazz
- Length: 51:02
- Label: Enja; ENJ 6070

Franco Ambrosetti chronology
Movies Too (1985)	Music for Symphony and Jazz Band (1991)	Live at the Blue Note (1992)

Music for Symphony and Jazz Band is an album by the trumpeter/flugelhornist and composer Franco Ambrosetti which was recorded in 1990 and released on the Enja label the following year.

== Reception ==
Professional ratings
Review scores
Source	Rating
Allmusic	4.5/5 stars

The Allmusic review by Scott Yanow stated "This CD is a classic, one of the all-time best examples of third stream music (a combination of jazz and classical music)".

== Track listing ==
1. "C Jam Blues" (Duke Ellington) – 5:34
2. "Night and Day" (Cole Porter) – 6:13
3. "The Grave" (Daniel Schnyder) – 6:03
4. "Well, You Needn't" (Thelonious Monk) – 7:03
5. "Peace" (Horace Silver) – 4:03
6. "The Night Has a Thousand Eyes" (Jerry Brainin, Buddy Bernier) – 6:27
7. "Close Encounter" (Franco Ambrosetti) – 4:51
8. "Inside the Dome" (Schnyder) – 6:31
9. "Manteca" (Dizzy Gillespie) – 4:17

== Personnel ==
- Franco Ambrosetti – trumpet, flugelhorn
- Daniel Schnyder – soprano saxophone
- Greg Osby – alto saxophone
- Wladshaw Sendecki – piano, arranger
- Simon Nabatov – piano (tracks 2, 4 & 8)
- Ed Schuller – bass
- Alfredo Golina – drums
- NDR Symphony Orchestra directed by Dieter Glawischnig
