= Raymond Droz =

Swiss trombonist (1934–2000)

Raymond Droz (January 23, 1934, La Chaux-de-Fonds – June 29, 2000, Zürich) was a Swiss jazz trombonist, arranger, and bandleader.

Droz won first prize at the first Zurich Jazz Festival in 1951 as a trombonist. In the next few years he played with Claude Albert and with his own Dixieland jazz band, and in 1956–1957 worked in Lausanne as a radio technician. He toured with his own bands, which included as sidemen Charly Antolini, Jean-Pierre Bionda, Raymond Court, and Pierre Favre. Between 1958 and 1964 he was a member of the orchestra of Kurt Edelhagen in Cologne, then became the first trombonist to be part of the radio entertainment orchestra of Schweizer Radio DRS, where he contributed many arrangements and compositions. He also arranged for the Ted Haenzi Big Band. He performed with Clark Terry at the Montreux Jazz Festival and in Switzerland with small ensembles. In 1985, he resigned from the DRS orchestra after health problems, but still played occasional sessions. He also worked with Heinz Kretzschmar (1960), Bill Ramsey (1965), Buck Clayton (1966), Rex Stewart (1966), Othella Dallas (1967), Gabriela Schaaf (1979) and The New Zürich Jazztet (1981).
