= Big Band Record =

Studio album by Ray Anderson with the George Gruntz Concert Jazz Band
- Released: 1994; 30 years ago
- Recorded: January 11–13, 1994
- Studio: Clinton Studios, NYC
- Genre: Jazz
- Length: 76:13
- Label: Gramavision; R2 79497
- Producer: Ray Anderson and George Gruntz

Ray Anderson chronology
Every One of Us (1992)	Big Band Record (1994)	Azurety (1994)

George Gruntz chronology
Cosmopolitan Greetings (1993)	Big Band Record (1994)	Mock-Lo-Motion (1995)

Big Band Record is an album by trombonist Ray Anderson and the George Gruntz Concert Jazz Band which was released on the Gramavision label in 1994.

== Reception ==
Professional ratings
Review scores
Source	Rating
Allmusic	4.5/5 stars

The Allmusic review by Scott Yanow stated "The often riotous trombonist is fortunate to have his complex but always lively music interpreted by quite an all-star group and Gruntz's arrangements give each musician at least one opportunity to solo. ... it is little surprise that this was one of the top jazz albums released in 1994".

== Track listing ==
All compositions by Ray Anderson except where noted

1. "Lips Apart" – 9:57
2. "Anabel at One" – 13:20
3. "My Wish" – 6:05
4. "Raven-a-Ning" – 4:28
5. "Leo's Place" – 8:03
6. "Seven Monsters" – 10:40
7. "Waltz for Phoebe" – 5:13
8. "The Literary Lizard" – 9:53
9. "Don't Mow Your Lawn" (Ray Anderson, Jackie Raven) – 8:34

== Personnel ==
- Ray Anderson – trombone
- George Gruntz – piano
- Lew Soloff – trumpet
- Ryan Kisor – trumpet
- John D'earth – trumpet
- Herb Robertson – trumpet
- Art Baron – trombone
- Dave Bargeron – trombone
- Dave Taylor – bass trombone
- Howard Johnson – tuba, baritone saxophone
- Tim Berne – alto saxophone
- Marty Ehrlich – alto saxophone, clarinet, soprano saxophone, bass clarinet
- Ellery Eskelin – tenor saxophone
- Sal Giorgianni – tenor saxophone
- Larry Schneider – tenor saxophone
- Mark Feldman – violin
- Drew Gress – bass
- Tom Rainey – drums
