= Every One of Us (Ray Anderson album) =

Studio album by Ray Anderson
- Released: 1992
- Genre: Jazz
- Label: Gramavision
- Producer: Ray Anderson, Mark Helias

Ray Anderson chronology
Wishbone (1991)	Every One of Us (1992)	Big Band Record (1994)

Every One of Us is an album by the American musician Ray Anderson, released in 1992. He supported the album with a North American tour. The album is dedicated to John Coltrane and includes a version of his composition "Dear Lord".

== Production ==
Anderson was backed by Ed Blackwell on drums, Charlie Haden on bass, and Simon Nabatov on piano. He sang on two of the seven tracks, "Brother, Can You Spare a Dime?" and "Snoo Tune (For Anabel)". "Lady Day" is a version of the Wayne Shorter song. "Funkalific" ends with second line drumming. "Muddy and Willie" is a tribute to Muddy Waters and Willie Dixon. "Kinda Garnerish" was inspired by the music of Erroll Garner. "Snoo Tune (For Anabel)" was written for Anderson's daughter.

== Critical reception ==
Professional ratings
Review scores
Source	Rating
AllMusic	3/5 stars
Daily Herald	A−
MusicHound Jazz: The Essential Album Guide	4.5/5 stars
The Penguin Guide to Jazz on CD, LP & Cassette	3.5/4 stars
The Philadelphia Inquirer	3/4 stars

The Chicago Tribune stated that "Anderson's trademark wit is again in evidence, but this time he displays also more of his serious and spiritual side"; the paper later listed Every One of Us as the best jazz album of 1992. The Philadelphia Inquirer said that Anderson "splats and smears and spritzes his way through seven tunes in a freewheeling manner that compels you to accept him on his own colloquial terms." The Toronto Star opined that "'Funkalific' and 'Kinda Garnerish' are wild feats of imagination".

The Philadelphia Daily News noted that "Anderson is a trombonist who has never fooled himself about the comic propensities of the instrument". The Globe and Mail said that Anderson's "solos, mostly muted, are one exaggerated sound after another, and his singing is similarly blowsy". The Daily Herald concluded that "Anderson continually subverts the traditional quartet approach with his growling, rough-edged tone". The Tampa Tribune deemed Every One of Us the eighth best jazz album of the year.

In 1998, MusicHound Jazz: The Essential Album Guide labeled the album "a classic".

== Track listing ==
No.	Title	Length
1.	"Funkalific"
2.	"Brother, Can You Spare a Dime?"
3.	"Kinda Garnerish"
4.	"Muddy and Willie"
5.	"Snoo Tune (For Anabel)"
6.	"Lady Day"
7.	"Dear Lord"
