= Hacke Björksten =

Finnish-Swedish jazz bandleader and saxophonist (1934–2020)

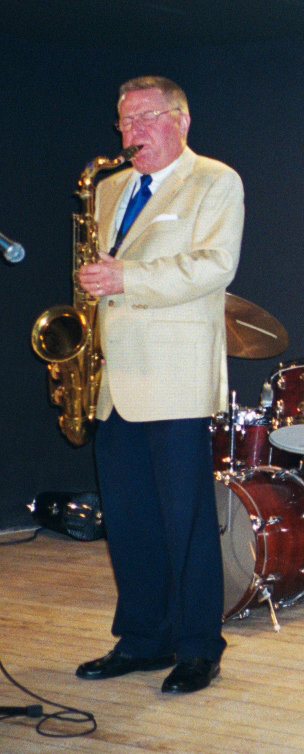
Hacke Björksten 2001

Gunnar Olof "Hacke" Björksten (February 17, 1934 in Helsinki – December 17, 2020 in Stockholm) was a Finnish-Swedish jazz bandleader and saxophonist.

Hacke Björksten lived in Finland until 1945, when his parents moved to Sweden; he gained his first break as a teenager in Kenneth Fagerlund's band in Gothenburg. In 1954, he founded his own ensemble in Stockholm, which included trombonist Åke Persson, pianist Rune Öfwerman, and vibraphonist Kurt Weil as sidemen; this band was active through the end of the decade. He played less frequently in the 1960s, but returned to recording in the 1970s and 1980s, including with Mel Lewis and Ulf Johansson.

== Discography ==
Please note this list is incomplete.

- 2004 — Hacke Björksten Quintet – Three Generations, Dragon (8) – DRCD 397
- 2014 — Hacke Björksten, Ulf Johansson Werre, Hans Backenroth – Top Three, Do Music Records – DMRCD 023
