= Peter Jarvis =

American drummer

- Born: 1959 (age 66–67); Hackensack, New Jersey, United States
- Occupations: Director, Composer, Conductor, Percussionist/Drummer, College/University Professor, Music Copyist, Editor
- Instruments: Percussion, Drums
- Labels: Nonesuch, NAXOS, Abkco, Composers Concordance Records, Capstone Records, Composers Recording Incorporated, Furious Artisans, Koch International, several others

Peter Jarvis (born 1959) is an American percussionist, director, drummer, conductor, composer, music copyist, print music editor, and retired college professor.

== Career ==
Jarvis is Director of the New Jersey Percussion Ensemble and Associate Director of the Composer Concordance.

Jarvis composed, orchestrated, arranged and performed music for Moonrise Kingdom, a film by Wes Anderson, which opened the Cannes Film Festival on May 16, 2012. Moonrise Kingdom received a Golden Globe and Academy Award nomination for "Best Score" in 2013. His involvement in the film as a composer included contributing to a score by Benjamin Britten and composing original music for several scenes. As arranger and orchestrator he worked on music composed by Mark Mothersbaugh and, as a performer, he led the percussion section and provided several improvisations. He also performed his own solo percussion music for the second, third, fourth and fifth seasons of the HBO Series "Boardwalk Empire." Jarvis worked on Ang Lee’s 2016 film Billy Lynn’s Long Halftime Walk, transcribing and arranging the score as well as performing as a percussionist. More recently he recorded for the soundtrack of Scott Cooper's The Pale Blue Eye, starring Christian Bale.

Over the decades, he has performed as a soloist, chamber player, Broadway musician and as conductor with chamber music ensembles including the Velez / Jarvis Duo, the Chamber Music Society of Lincoln Center, CompCord Ensemble, The Group for Contemporary Music, Saint Luke's Chamber Ensemble, the New Jersey Percussion Ensemble (which he directs) and at the Hong Kong Arts Festival. He has performed for PBS, as well as on Russian and Hong Kong television broadcasts.

Jarvis has recorded with the musicians Milton Babbitt, John Cage and Steve Reich. He has appeared as guest conductor on the San Francisco Symphony's New and Unusual Music Series with the New Jersey Percussion Ensemble.

Jarvis' compositions are published by Calabrese Brothers Music LLC, Indian Paintbrush Productions, Peter Jarvis Music Publishing, and L-T Music Publishing. He is a voting member of The Recording Academy which selects The Grammy_Awards winners, and is a member of Broadcast Music, Inc.

== Transcriptions ==
Published by Calabrese Brothers Music, LLC.

=== Chamber ===
- Rockaby for voice and piano (2003) — Ron Mazurek, transcribed for voice and vibraphone, Op. 14 (2011) by Peter Jarvis, premiered by the William Paterson University New Music Ensemble; Erica Tanner and Nicolas Doktor, March 28, 2011, at William Paterson University, Wayne, New Jersey.
- Fugue in G minor, "Little" BWV 578 – Johann Sebastian Bach, transcribed for Mallet Quartet, Op. 12 (2010) by Peter Jarvis.

== Film and Television (partial list) ==
=== Film ===
- 2021 — "The Pale Blue Eye", directed by Scott Cooper
- 2016 — "Billy Lynn's Long Halftime Walk", directed by Ang Lee.
- 2011 — "Moonrise Kingdom", Op. 19 — Music for the movie directed by Wes Anderson; Moonrise Kingdom, Op. 19, refers to all of the music Jarvis worked on including original music, arrangements and transcriptions. Published by Indian Paintbrush Productions.

=== Television ===
- Surveying Carnage, Op. 21 (2012) — percussion solos, improvisations for the HBO series Boardwalk Empire – season 3, multiple episodes. Published by L-T Music Publishing.
- On the Boardwalk, Op. 18 (2011) — percussion solo, a multi-track improvisation for the HBO series Boardwalk Empire. Used in episode 10 of season 2: "Georgia Peaches" aired on November 27, 2011. Published by L-T Music Publishing.

=== Documentary ===
- 1995 — Musical Outsiders: An American Legacy — Harry Partch, Lou Harrison, and Terry Riley. Directed by Michael Blackwood. Performing with NewBand.

== DVDs (partial list) ==
- Billy Lynn's Long Halftime Walk (released November 11, 2016) – A TriStar Pictures release. Written by Jean-Christophe Castelli, directed by Ang Lee. Various transcriptions, arrangements, and improvisations by Peter Jarvis on the soundtrack.
- Moonrise Kingdom (released October 16, 2012) – An American Empirical Picture presented by Focus Features and Indian Paintbrush. Written by Wes Anderson and Roman Coppola, directed by Wes Anderson. Various compositions, arrangements, orchestrations and performances by Peter Jarvis on the soundtrack.
- Boardwalk Empire – Seasons 2-5, – An HBO Production. "Georgia Peaches" (episode 10), solo percussion performance of "On the Boardwalk" by Peter Jarvis on the soundtrack. During seasons 2-5 Jarvis performs in over 10 episodes.

== Discography (partial list) ==
=== Composer/Percussionist/Conductor/Director ===
- Entertwined – Featuring the New Jersey Percussion Ensemble (Peter Jarvis - conductor) performing "Chamber Setting #2" by Robert Pollock. Furious Artisans FACD6827.
- Jarvis and Friends, Volume 4 – Featuring the New Jersey Percussion Ensemble performing solo and chamber music by Jarvis. Composers Concordance Records COMCON0064 – NAXOS
- Jarvis and Friends, Volume 3 – With Chris Opperman performing duos with Jarvis, and several others performing music by Jarvis. Composers Concordance Records COMCON0063 – NAXOS
- Dragonfly – Peter Jarvis and William Schimmel – All music by Jarvis and Schimmel – Composers Concordance Records COMCON0060 – NAXOS
- Der Weg Ins Freie – William Anderson – Cygnus Ensemble – FURIOUS ARTISANS Productions – FACD6819
- Chamber Music from Hell – Chris Opperman "Owl Flight" recorded by the New Jersey Percussion Ensemble.
- Jarvis and Friends, Volume 2 – With Payton MacDonald, Kevin Norton, Gene Pritsker, and David Taylor – Composers Concordance Records – NAXOS
- Payton MacDonald: Solo Marimba Includes my Opus 16 "Saties Hammock" Composers Concordance Records – COMCON0051 – NAXOS
- Jarvis and Friends, Volume 1 – With Glen Velez, Franz Hackl, William Schimmel, and John Clark. – Composers Concordance Records COMCON0046 – NAXOS
- New Jersey Percussion Ensemble and Friends at 50, Volume 1 – Composers Concordance Records COMCON0045 – NAXOS
- Explorations – "Chamber Setting No. 2" – Robert Pollock, New Jersey Percussion Ensemble, Peter Jarvis, conductor – Ebb and Flow Arts
- New Music For Percussion: Night Music – Jeffrey Kresky, John Ferrari, Peter Jarvis and Payton MacDonald – Percussion. Drumming For Milton" by Peter Jarvis, Paul Carroll drum set. "Concerto for Vibraphone and Percussion Ensemble by Peter Jarvis, performed by the New Jersey Percussion Ensemble, John Ferrari – vibraphone soloist, Peter Jarvis – conductor. William Paterson University Recording Label. Recorded in 2014.
- Moonrise Kingdom – The Original Soundtrack; Track 2 performed by Peter Jarvis. Label: Abkco
- Jersey Sessions Volume 2: Passing Fancies – Stephen Peles, Peter Jarvis – Percussion, Robert Pollock – Piano, Music for Winds, Percussion, 'Cello & Voices – Rolv Yttrehus – Composers Guild of New Jersey Performance Ensemble, Peter Jarvis, conductor, Composers Guild of New Jersey, 1990, #CGNJ 0990
- Milton Babbitt – A Composers' Memorial; For Milton, Composed by David Saperstein, Peter Jarvis – vibraphone. Perspectives of New Music/Open Space Records, 2012, pnm/os cd 3
- ballets and solos; The International Street Cannibals Ensemble – Solo for Pete, Composed by Patrick Hardish, Peter Jarvis – drum set. Composers Concordance Records – on Naxos
- Milton Babbitt: Soli e Duettini; Homily for Solo Snare Drum, The Group for Contemporary Music, Koch International, 1996, 3-7335-2H1 and Naxos 8.559259
- Society of Composers, Inc.: Milestones; Night Black Bird Song, for 2 piccolos & 3 percussionists – Emily Doolittle, Capstone Records, CD #8701
- American Classics – George Antheil: Ballet Mécanique – Philadelphia Virtuosi Chamber Orchestra – Naxos 8.559060
- Floating Bridge – ECM Tour; Floating Bridge – Kung Chi Shing, recorded live in Taiwan – Kung Ensemble, October Music, 1996, ECM Tour in Taiwan
- Destiny Travels Limited; Destiny Travels Limited – Kung Chi Shing, recorded live in Hong Kong – Kung Ensemble, October Music, 1996, #5
- Andrew Ford: Icarus; Chamber Concerto No. 3: In Constant Light – Terra Australis Incognita, Tall Poppies #150
- New Sounds From The Village; Encounters – Ron Mazurek – Percussion Quartet, Capstone Records, 1994, #CPS 8616
- Jersey Sessions Volume 3: In Search Of. . . Percussion Solo with Electronic Sound – Ron Mazurek, Peter Jarvis – Percussion, Ballet Mécanique – George Antheil, Composers Guild of New Jersey, 1992, #CGNJ 0393;
- David Rakowski: Hyper Blue; Ensemble21 – Sesso e Violenza, Peter Jarvis, conductor, tracks 6, 7 & 8. CRI CD820
- Charles Wuorinen: The Group for Contemporary Music – Percussion Quartet – Charles Wuorinen – Peter Jarvis, conductor, Koch International, 1997, #3-7410-2H1
- Charles Wuorinen: Tashi – New Jersey Percussion Ensemble – Percussion Quartet – Charles Wuorinen – Peter Jarvis, conductor, NAXOS 8.559321
- The Music of Rolv Yttrehus – Music for Winds, Percussion, 'Cello & Voices, Composers Guild of New Jersey Performance Ensemble – Peter Jarvis, conductor, CRI CD 843
- Jersey Sessions Volume 1: Concertino – Roger Sessions, CGNJ Performance Ensemble, David Gilbert, conductor, Revolution – Robert Pollock, Cygnus Ensemble, Joel Suben, conductor, Composers Guild of New Jersey, 1989, #CGNJ 0989
- Percussion Music; Percussion Symphony – Charles Wuorinen, Charles Wuorinen, conductor, Elektra/Nonesuch, 1988, #979150-2
- Music of David Olan and Chester Biscardi; Prism – David Olan, Peter Jarvis, conductor, Composer's Recording Inc., 1986, #CRI CD 585
