= Flavio Ambrosetti =

Swiss jazz musician and engineer (1919–2012)

Flavio Ambrosetti (October 8, 1919 in Lugano – August 21, 2012 in Ticino) was a Swiss jazz vibraphonist, saxophonist, and engineer.

Ambrosetti's primary career was in engineering; his acclaim in jazz circles has come entirely from his activities as an occasional musician. He studied piano as a child and taught himself to play tenor and alto saxophone as a teenager. He attended engineering school in Zürich and played with Rio de Gregori during World War II; later in the decade he worked with Gil Cuppini and Hazy Osterwald. In the 1950s he played as a sideman and with his own ensemble, which included Raymond Court and George Gruntz. In the 1960s he led a quintet which included his son, Franco Ambrosetti, as well as George Gruntz and Daniel Humair, which toured and was featured on television and radio broadcasts. He expanded this ensemble to a big band in 1972, touring in Europe and playing with Dexter Gordon and Phil Woods. Gruntz became the leader of this group in 1978.
