= Othella Dallas =

American dancer and jazz singer (1925–2020)

- Birth name: Othella Strozier
- Born: September 26, 1925; Memphis, Tennessee, United States
- Died: November 28, 2020 (aged 95); Basel, Switzerland
- Genres: Jazz
- Occupation(s): Dancer, singer

Othella Dallas (September 26, 1925 – November 28, 2020) was an American dancer and jazz singer. After working in Paris and Zürich, she opened a dance school in Basel's Gundeldingen quarter in 1975, where she taught the Dunham technique.

== Life and career ==
Dallas, whose mother was the first African American pianist to be heard on the St. Louis radio, comes from a musical family; her half-brother is Frank Strozier. W. C. Handy was her babysitter. In 1943 she was discovered by Katherine Dunham at a school performance in St. Louis, who brought her to her dance company in New York. As a solo dancer for the Dunham Company, Strozier toured as far as South America and Europe. After their marriage, she moved to France in 1949. There she began to perform as a singer from 1952, also with greats like Sidney Bechet and Nat King Cole. In addition, she founded a dance school there, as in the 1960s in Zürich, where she taught Margrit Läubli, Daniel Spoerri, Ruedi Walter and Margrit Rainer. Duke Ellington wrote two songs for her; The singer's first recordings were made in 1967 with Mac Strittmatter's septet. Further albums were made from the 1980s. On her 70th birthday, she performed for three weeks in the Basler Tabourettli, and later toured Russia. Her CD I Live the Life I Love (2008) gave her appearances at the Festival da Jazz in St. Moritz as well as at the Theater Rigiblick in Zürich.

Andres Brütsch made the documentary, Othella Dallas - What Is Luck?, about her which premiered in 2015.

Her dance workshops, which she held not only in Basel, but also in other European cities such as London, were popular because she was the last still active dance teacher who had danced with Katherine Dunham. As a jazz singer, Dallas toured Switzerland with her band in 2019 as part of the "94th Anniversary Tour".

== Discography ==
- Little Girl from Memphis: The Show 1925-1995 (Mons Records 1995, with Thomas Moeckel, Philippe Hammel, Kirk Lightsey, Tibor Elekes, John Betsch)
- Fever for Bluesy Jazz (Mons Records 1995, with Matthias Bröde, Hubert Nuss, Christian Ramond, Hans Braber)
- What's This Thing Called Love? (Brambus Records 2000, with Pius Baschnagel, Nick Mens, Thomas Silvestri)
- I Live the Life I Love (Suonix 2008)

== Awards ==
- 2019: Swiss Jazz Award
