= Franco Ambrosetti =

Swiss jazz musician and composer

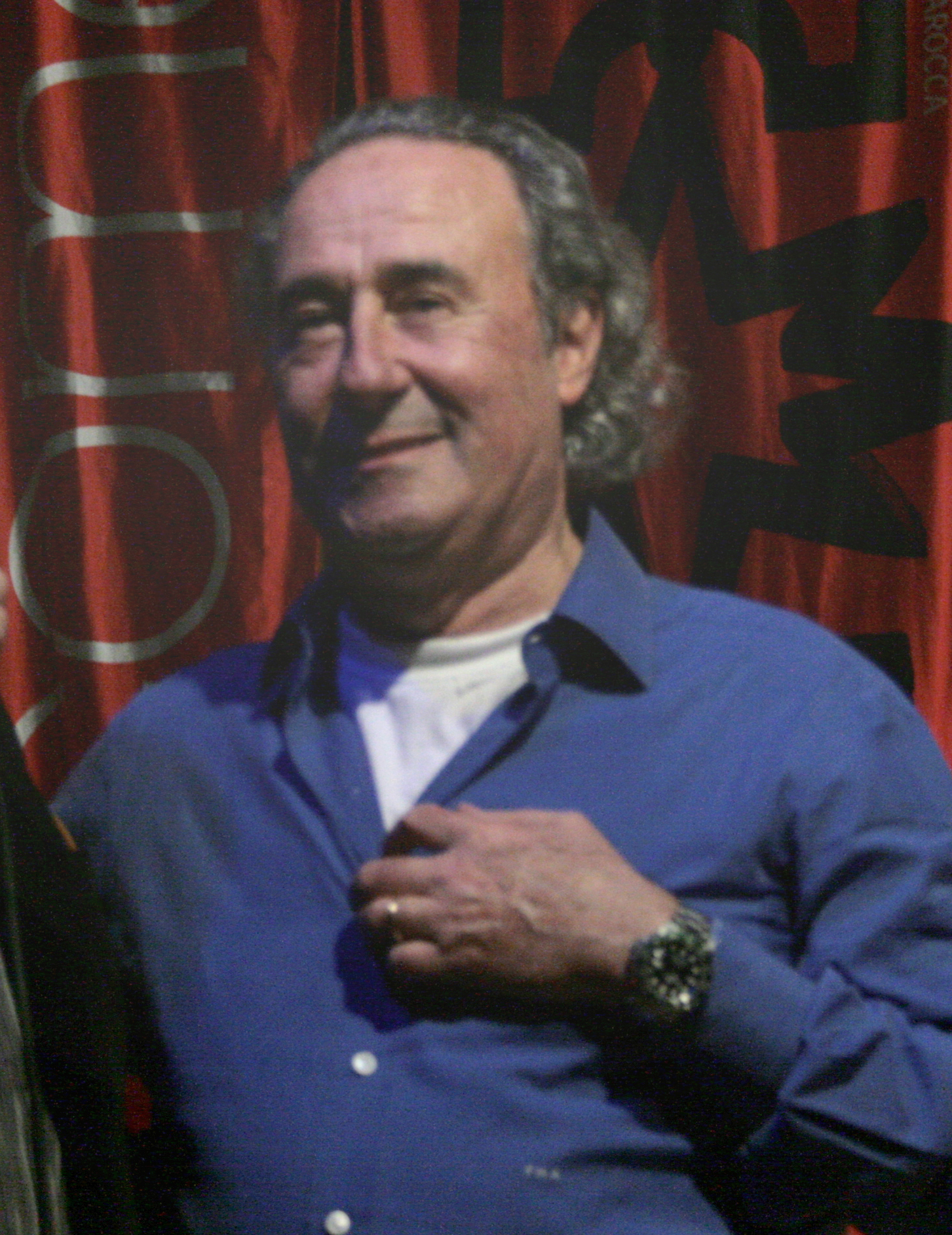

Background information
- Born: 10 December 1941 (age 84); Lugano, Switzerland
- Genre: Jazz
- Occupations: Musician, composer
- Instruments: Trumpet, flugelhorn
- Website: francoambrosetti.com

Franco Ambrosetti (born 10 December 1941) is a jazz trumpeter, flugelhornist and composer. He was born in Lugano, Switzerland; his father, Flavio, was a saxophonist who once played opposite Charlie Parker. He has recorded several albums for Enja Records, and worked professionally with his father in a group which also included George Gruntz.

Ambrosetti has classical piano training and is also a self-taught trumpeter. Ambrosetti has worked with several American and European musicians in recordings and at jazz festivals and concerts, including Kenny Clarke, Dexter Gordon, Phil Woods, Cannonball Adderley, Joe Henderson, Michael Brecker, Mike Stern, Hal Galper and Romano Mussolini. Ambrosetti also holds a master's degree in economics from the University of Basel.

== Discography ==
=== As leader ===
- A Jazz Portrait of Franco Ambrosetti (Durium, 1965)
- The Jazz Live Situation (Dire, 1973)
- Jazz a Confronto 11 (Horo, 1974)
- Steppenwolf (PDU, 1975)
- Franco Ambrosetti Quartet (PDU, 1976)
- Close Encounter (Enja, 1978)
- Sleeping Gypsy with Don Sebesky (Gryphon, 1980)
- Heart Bop (Enja, 1981)
- Wings (Enja, 1984)
- Tentets (Enja, 1985)
- Movies (Enja, 1987)
- Movies Too (Enja, 1988)
- Music for Symphony and Jazz Band (Enja, 1991)
- Live at the Blue Note (Enja, 1993)
- Light Breeze (Enja, 1998)
- Grazie Italia (Enja, 2000)
- European Legacy (Enja, 2003)
- Liquid Gardens (Enja, 2006)
- The Wind (Enja, 2007)
- Locomotion (Sound Hills, 2007)
- After the Rain (Enja, 2015)
- Cheers (Enja, 2017)
- The Nearness of You (Unit, 2018)
- Long Waves (Unit, 2019)
- Lost Within You (Unit, 2021)

=== As sideman ===
With George Gruntz

- Drums and Folklore (SABA, 1967)
- For Flying Out Proud (MPS, 1978)
- First Prize (Enja, 1989)
- Serious Fun (Enja, 1990)
- Blues 'n' Dues Et Cetera (Enja, 1991)
- Living Transition (AMIGA, 1988)
- Happening Now! (Hat ART, 1988)
- Mock-Lo-Motion (TCB, 1995)
- Renaissance Man (TCB, 2002)
- Tiger by the Tail (TCB, 2006)

With Mina

- Uiallalla (PDU, 1989)
- Ti conosco mascherina (PDU, 1990)
- Caterpillar (PDU, 1991)
- Sorelle Lumière (PDU, 1992)
- Mina canta i Beatles (PDU, 1993)
- Mazzini canta Battisti (PDU, 1994)
- Canarino mannaro (PDU, 1994)
- Pappa di latte (PDU, 1995)
- Cremona (PDU, 1996)
- Napoli (PDU, 1996)
- Sconcerto (PDU, 2001)
- Veleno (PDU, 2002)
- Bula Bula (PDU/Sony, 2005)
- L'allieva (PDU/Sony, 2005)
- Caramella (PDU, 2014)

With others

- Flavio Ambrosetti, Jazz Stars (Dire, 1968)
- David Buzzi, americanfly.chat (Pyramide/SELF, 2021)
- Antonio Faraò, Expose (Dischi Della Quercia, 1996)
- Paul Heller, Kaleidoscope (Mons, 1996)
- Enrico Intra, Live in Milan (Albore, 2009)
- Quincy Jones, The 75th Birthday Celebration (Eagle, 2009)
- Dado Moroni, Niels-Henning Ørsted Pedersen, Bluesology (Dire, 1981)
- Dino Betti van der Noot, Here Comes Springtime (Soul Note, 1985)
- Miroslav Vitouš, Remembering Weather Report (ECM, 2009)
