= Daniel Humair =

Swiss drummer, composer & painter

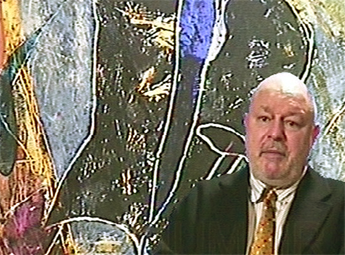
- Screenshot of a video by l'Encyclopédie audiovisuelle de l'art contemporain

Background information
- Born: 23 May 1938 (age 87); Geneva, Switzerland
- Genres: Jazz
- Occupation(s): Musician, composer, artist
- Instrument: Drums
- Years active: 1960–present
- Labels: Musica
- Website: www.danielhumair.com

Daniel Humair (born 23 May 1938 in Geneva, Switzerland) is a Swiss drummer, composer, and painter.

He is widely renowned and became a Chevalier of the Ordre des Arts et des Lettres in 1986 and Officer in 1992. He has played with many jazz performers notably Phil Woods, Jean-Luc Ponty, Chet Baker, Michel Portal, Martial Solal, Dexter Gordon, Gerry Mulligan, Rahsaan Roland Kirk and Eric Dolphy.

Humair is also a talented painter. He describes his own work as "figurative abstract" and has created a coherent œuvre proving his passion and knowledge of artistic painting.

== Discography ==
=== As leader ===
- Hum! with Rene Urtreger, Pierre Michelot (Vega, 1960)
- Trio HLP (CBS, 1968)
- Drumo Vocalo (International Music Label, 1971)
- Our Kind of Sabi with Eddy Louiss, John Surman (MPS/BASF, 1970)
- Beck Mathewson Humair Trio (Dire, 1972)
- La Sorcellerie a Travers Les Ages with Jean Luc Ponty, Phil Woods, Eddy Louiss (1977)
- Suite for Trio with Martial Solal, Niels-Henning Ørsted Pedersen (MPS 1978)
- Urtreger Michelot Humair with Rene Urtreger, Pierre Michelot (Carlyne Music, 1979)
- Humair Jeanneau Texier (Owl, 1979)
- Triple Hip Trip (Owl, 1979)
- Apocalypse with Jean-Charles Capon (Magicabus, 1980)
- East Side West Side (Owl, 1981)
- Akagera with Jeanneau/Texier (JMS, 1980)
- Scratch with Kenny Barron, Dave Holland (Enja, 1985)
- Pepites with Andre Jaume (CELP, 1987)
- 9–11 p.m. Town Hall with Michel Portal (Label Bleu, 1988)
- Quatre with Rava/D'Andrea/Vitous (Gala, 1989)
- Up Date 3.3 with Francois Jeanneau, Henri Texier (Label Bleu, 1990)
- Edges (Label Bleu, 1991)
- Earthcake with Quatre (Gala, 1991)
- Vol. 1 with Louiss/Ponty (Dreyfus, 1991)
- Vol. 2 with Louiss/Ponty (Dreyfus, 1991)
- Solo Print with Roland Auzet (Iris Musique, 1997)
- Quatre Fois Trois (Label Bleu, 1998)
- HUM (Humair Urteger Michelot) (Sketch, 1999)
- Borderlines with Farao/Avenel (Sketch, 2000)
- Liberte Surveillee (Sketch, 2001)
- Frontier Traffic with Charlie Mariano (Konnex, 2002)
- Work with Steve Lacy (Sketch, 2002)
- Baby Boom (Sketch, 2003)
- Ear Mix with Stamm/Friedman/Boisseau (Sketch, 2003)
- Tryptic with Celea/Couturier (Bee Jazz, 2007)
- Bonus Boom (Bee Jazz, 2008)
- Full Contact with Joachim Kuhn (Bee Jazz, 2008)
- Pas de Dense with Tony Malaby (Zig Zag, 2010)
- Jazz Festival, Kulturzentrum Kammgarn Schaffhausen, Switzerland (UWM, 2011)
- Sweet & Sour (Laborie, 2012)
- Lights with Nicolas Former (Cristal, 2012)
- Seasoning (Intuition, 2017)
- Modern Art (INC/SES, 2017)

=== As sideman ===
With Franco Ambrosetti

- Jazz a Confronto 11 (Horo, 1974)
- Steppenwolf (PDU, 1975)
- Franco Ambrosetti Quartet (PDU, 1976)
- Wings (Enja, 1984)
- Tentets (Enja, 1985)
- Movies (Enja, 1987)
- Movies Too (Enja, 1988)
- European Legacy (Enja, 2003)
- Liquid Gardens (Enja, 2006)

With European Jazz Ensemble

- 20th Anniversary Tour (Konnex, 1997)
- 25th Anniversary (Konnex, 2002)
- 30th Anniversary Tour 2006 (Konnex, 2009)

With Stephane Grappelli

- Just One of Those Things! (Black Lion 1973)
- Les Grands Classiques Du Jazz (Festival, 1973)
- Les Valseuses (Festival, 1974)
- Django (Barclay, 1976)
- Stephane Grappelli with Bill Coleman (Classic Jazz, 1976)
- Giants (MPS 1981)
- Feeling + Finesse = Jazz (Atlantic, 1984)
- Anything Goes (CBS, 1989)
- Stephane Grappelli Plays Cole Porter (Gitanes, 2001)
- Stephane Grappelli Plays George Gershwin (Festival)

With George Gruntz

- Jazz Goes Baroque 2 (Philips, 1965)
- Drums and Folklore (SABA, 1967)
- Noon in Tunisia (SABA, 1967)
- St. Peter Power (MPS, 1968)
- Monster Sticksland Meeting Two Monster Jazz (MPS 1974)
- For Flying Out Proud (MPS, 1978)

With Raymond Guiot

- Jazz Baroque Quintet (Tele Music, 1970)
- Joue Domenico Scarlatti (Decca, 1970)
- Haendel with Care (Musidisc, 1973)

With Joachim Kuhn & J.F. Jenny-Clark

- Easy to Read (Owl, 1985)
- From Time to Time (CMP, 1988)
- Live Theatre De La Ville Paris 1989 (CMP, 1990)
- Carambolage (CMP, 1992)
- Usual Confusion (Label Bleu, 1993)
- Triple Entente (EmArcy, 1998)

With Claude Nougaro

- No. 2 (Philips, 1963)
- Claude Nougaro (Philips, 1966)
- Paris Mai (Philips, 1969)
- Le Disque D'Or De Claude Nougaro (Philips, 1972)
- Les Grandes Chansons De Claude Nougaro Une Petite Fille (Philips, 1972)

With Jean-Luc Ponty

- Jazz Long Playing (Philips, 1964)
- Sunday Walk (SABA, 1967)
- More Than Meets the Ear (Pacific Jazz, 1968)

With Michel Portal

- Any Way (Label Bleu, 1993)
- L'ombre Rouge (Saravah, 1981)
- Turbulence (Harmonia Mundi, 1987)

With Rhoda Scott

- A L'Orgue Hammond Take a Ladder (RSB, 1969)
- A L'Orgue Hammond Vol. 2 (Barclay, 1970)
- Rhoda Scott (Budapesten Pepita 1975)

With Martial Solal

- Martial Solal (Columbia, 1960)
- Jazz a Gaveau (Columbia, 1962)
- Concert a Gaveau Vol. 2 (Columbia, 1964)
- Solal! (Milestone, 1967)
- Contrastes (Storyville, 1999)
- A Bout de Souffle (EmArcy, 2002)

With Swingle Singers

- Anyone for Mozart? (Philips, 1964)
- Les Romantiques (Philips, 1965)
- Rococo a Go Go (Philips, 1966)
- Concerto D'Aranjuez Sounds of Spain (Philips, 1967)
- J. S. Bach (Philips, 1968)
- The Swingle Singers Meet the Modern Jazz Quartet (Philips, 1968)
- Jazz Sebastian Bach Vol. 2 (Philips, 1968)
- Christmastime (EmArcy, 1968)

With Barney Wilen

- Barney (RCA, 1960)
- More from Barney at the Club Saint-Germain (RCA Victor, 1997)
- Le Jardin Aux Sentiers Qui Bifurquent (CELP, 2004)

With Phil Woods

- Alive and Well in Paris (Pathe, 1968)
- At the Montreux Jazz Festival (MGM, 1970)
- Phil Woods and His European Rhythm Machine (Pierre Cardin, 1970)
- Live at Montreux 72 (Pierre Cardin, 1972)
- Woods-Notes (Joker, 1977)
- The Birth of the ERM the Ljubljana and Bologna Concerts (Philology, 1990)
- A Jazz Life (Philology, 1992)

With Attila Zoller

- The Horizon Beyond (EmArcy, 1965)

Memories of Pannonia (Enja, 1986)

- Overcome Live at the Leverkusen Jazz Festival (Enja, 1988)

With others

- Kenny Barron and Dave Holland, Scratch (Enja, 1985)
- Flavio Ambrosetti, Jazz Stars (Dire, 1968)
- Franck Amsallem, Years Gone By (A Records, 1998)
- Maurice Andre & Claude Bolling, Toot Suite (CBS, 1981)
- Georges Arvanitas, Soul Jazz (Columbia, 1960)
- Georges Arvanitas, Pianos Puzzle (Saravah, 1970)
- Marcel Azzola, Pieces Pour Claviers (Mazo 1983)
- Chet Baker, Chet Is Back! (RCA Victor, 1962)
- Mickey Baker, Mickey Baker Plays Mickey Baker (Versailles, 1962)
- Elek Bacsik, The Electric Guitar of the Eclectic Elek Bacsik (Fontana, 1962)
- Elek Bacsik, Guitar Conceptions (Fontana, 1963)
- The Band, The Alpine Power Plant (MPS/BASF, 1972)

The Band, Live at the Schauspielhaus (MPS 1976)

- Gordon Beck, All in the Morning (Art of Life, 1973)
- Lou Bennett, Dansez Et Revez (Phono, 2017)
- Jerry Bergonzi, Peek a Boo (Evidence, 1993)
- Jane Birkin, Versions Jane (Philips, 1996)
- Samuel Blaser, 1291 (OutNote Records, 2020)
- Gary Burton, Live in Cannes (Jazz World, 1995)
- Gary Burton, No More Blues (Magnum Music, 2000)
- Eugen Cicero, Mr. Golden Hands Vol. 1 (Intercord, 1976)
- Marius Constant & Martial Solal, Stress Psyche Trois Complexes (Erato, 1981)
- Bill Coleman, Mainstream at Montreux (Black Lion 1973)
- Alan Davie, Phantom in the Room (ADMW, 1971)
- Georges Delerue, Calmos (Black and Blue, 1975)
- Eric Demarsan, Le Cercle Rouge (Decca, 2000)
- Jack Dieval, Jack Dieval & Paris Jazz Quartet (Concert Hall, 1968)
- Jack Dieval, Pianos Duet (Columbia, 1969)
- Niels Lan Doky, Paris by Night (Soul Note, 1993)
- Les Double Six, Meet Quincy Jones (Columbia, 1960)
- Les Double Six, Les Double Six (Columbia, 1961)
- Art Farmer, What Happens ?... (Campi, 1968)
- Claudio Fasoli, Welcome (Soul Note, 1987)
- David Friedman, Of the Wind's Eye (Enja, 1981)
- David Friedman, Ternaire (Deux Z, 1992)
- Richard Galliano, French Touch (Dreyfus, 1998)
- Richard Galliano, Concerts Inedits (Dreyfus, 1999)
- Jef Gilson, OEil Vision (Club De L'Echiquier 1964)
- Jimmy Gourley, Graffitti (Promophone, 1977)
- Steve Grossman, Born at the Same Time (Owl, 1978)
- Jim Hall, It's Nice to Be with You (MPS 1969)
- Slide Hampton, Mellow-dy (LRC, 1992)
- Roland Hanna, Child of Gemini (MPS/BASF, 1971)
- Michel Hausser & Bobby Jaspar, Vibes + Flute (Columbia, 1960)
- Michel Hausser, Up in Hamburg (Columbia, 1960)
- Hampton Hawes, Piano Improvisation (Joker, 1977)
- Joe Henderson, Black Narcissus (Milestone, 1976)
- Hans Werner Henze, Cembalo Modern + Jazz (Philips, 1964)
- Antoine Herve, Enregistre a L'Usine Ephemere (Sari Seer 1990)
- Andre Hodeir, Anna Livia Plurabelle (Philips, 1966)
- Bobby Jaspar, The Bobby Jaspar Quartet at Ronnie Scott's 1962 (Mole, 1986)
- Bobby Jaspar, Le Jazz Est Un Roman (Owl, 2002)
- Francois Jeanneau, Ephemere (Owl, 1977)
- Francois Jeanneau, Terrains Vagues (Owl, 1983)
- Ivan Jullien, Live at Nancy Jazz Pulsations (Mimetik, 2019)
- Barney Kessel, Reflections in Rome (RCA Victor, 1969)
- Eartha Kitt, Thinking Jazz (ITM, 1991)
- Lee Konitz & Martial Solal, European Episode (Campi, 1969)
- Lee Konitz & Martial Solal, Impressive Rome (Campi, 1969)
- Lee Konitz, Jazz a Juan (SteepleChase, 1977)
- Hilaria Kramer, La Suite Live! (Unit, 2012)
- Karin Krog, Open Space (MPS 1969)
- Joachim Kuhn, This Way Out (MPS/BASF, 1973)
- Joachim Kuhn, Birthday Edition (ACT, 2014)
- Rolf Kuhn, Connection '74 (MPS/BASF, 1974)
- Rolf Kuhn, Total Space (MPS/BASF, 1975)
- Guy Lafitte, Blues (Vega, 1969)
- Christof Lauer, Evidence (CMP, 1995)
- John Lewis, Midnight in Paris (EmArcy, 1988)
- Rolf Liebermann, Les Echanges (EX 1964)
- Didier Lockwood, For Stephane (Ames, 2008)
- Steve Marcus, Green Line (Nivico, 1970)
- Helen Merrill, Just Friends (EmArcy, 1989)
- Jean-Christian Michel, Vol. 6 (General, 1973)
- Jean-Christian Michel, Vision D'Ezechiel (General, 1974)
- Jean-Christian Michel, Lumiere (General, 1980)
- Ray Nance, Huffin 'n' Puffin (MPS/BASF, 1974)
- Bud Powell, Memorial Oscar Pettiford (Vogue, 1960)
- Francois Rabbath, No. 2 (Philips, 1965)
- Francois Rabbath, 60 Emen, Moshe (Naim, 1990)
- Jean-Pierre Rampal, Picnic Suite (CBS, 1980)
- Henri Renaud, Blue Cylinder (PSI, 1970)
- Jérome Sabbagh, I Will Follow You (Bee Jazz, 2010)
- Larry Schneider, So Easy (Label Bleu, 1988)
- Dino Betti van der Noot, Here Comes Springtime (Soul Note, 1985)
- Joe Venuti, Doin' Things (Pausa, 1971)
