= George Gruntz =

Swiss jazz keyboardist and composer (1932–2013)

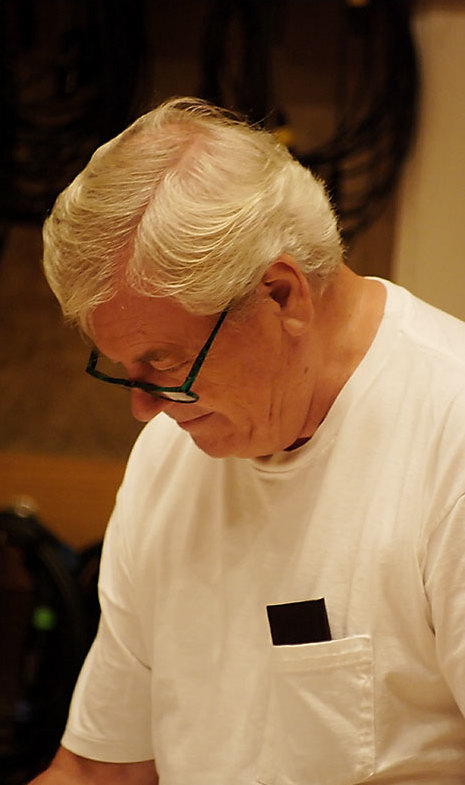

Background information
- Born: 24 June 1932; Basel, Switzerland
- Died: 10 January 2013 (aged 80) Basel, Switzerland
- Genres: Jazz
- Occupation: Musician
- Instruments: Piano, keyboards
- Years active: 1950s–2000s
- Labels: Enja, TCB

George Gruntz (24 June 1932 – 10 January 2013) was a Swiss jazz pianist, organist, harpsichordist, keyboardist, and composer known for the George Gruntz Concert Big Band and his work with Phil Woods, Rahsaan Roland Kirk, Don Cherry, Chet Baker, Art Farmer, Dexter Gordon, Johnny Griffin, and Mel Lewis.

Gruntz, who was born in Basel, Switzerland, was also an accomplished arranger and composer, having been commissioned by many orchestras and symphonies. From 1972 to 1994, he served as artistic director of JazzFest Berlin.

He died at the age of 80 in January 2013.

== Discography ==
=== As leader/co-leader ===
| Year recorded | Title | Label | Personnel/Notes |
|---|---|---|---|
| 1960 | Mental Cruelty: The 1960 Jazz soundtrack | Decca, Atavistic | released 1960, almost immediately withdrawn by the record company due to unresolved legal issues. Finally reissued in 2003 by Atavistic. |
| 1964 | Bach Humbug! Or Jazz Goes Baroque | | Quintet |
| 1964 | Jazz Goes Baroque | | |
| 1965 | Jazz Goes Baroque 2 – The Music of Italy | | |
| 1967 | Noon in Tunisia | | |
| 1967 | Drums and Folklore: From Sticksland with Love | | |
| 1968 | Saint Peter Power | | |
| 1972? | The Band – The Alpine Power Plant | | |
| 1973? | 2001 Keys – Piano Conclave | | |
| 1974? | Monster Sticksland Meeting Two – Monster Jazz | | |
| 1974? | Eternal Baroque | | |
| 1976? | The Band (Recorded Live at the Zürich Schauspielhaus) | | |
| 1977? | For Flying out Proud | | |
| 1977? | Percussion Profiles | | |
| 1978? | The George Gruntz Concert Big Band with Elvin Jones | | |
| 1980? | Live at the "Quartier Latin" Berlin | | |
| 1983 | Theatre | ECM | With big band |
| 1986? | Living Transition. With Radio Big Band Leipzig | | |
| 1987 | Happening Now! | HatHut | With big band (Concert Jazz Band '87) |
| 1989 | First Prize | Enja | With big band |
| 1989 | Serious Fun | Enja | Most tracks trio, with Mike Richmond (bass), Adam Nussbaum (drums); one track quartet, with Franco Ambrosetti (flugelhorn) added |
| 1991? | Blues 'n Dues Et Cetera | Enja | |
| 1992 | Beyond Another Wall | TCB | With big band; in concert |
| 1992? | Cosmopolitan Greetings | | composition for big band, libretto by Allen Ginsberg |
| 1994 | Big Band Record | Gramavision | Co-led with Ray Anderson (trombone); with big band |
| 1995 | Mock-Lo-Motion | TCB | Some tracks trio, with Mike Richmond (bass), Adam Nussbaum (drums); some tracks quartet, with Franco Ambrosetti (flugelhorn) added; in concert |
| 1998 | Liebermann | TCB | With big band |
| 1998 | Merryteria | TCB | With big band |
| 1999? | Live at JazzFest Berlin | | |
| 2000? | Expo Triangle | | |
| 2001 | Global Excellence | TCB | With big band |
| 2004 | Ringing the Luminator | ACT | Solo piano |
| 2003? | The Magic of a Flute | | With big band, eight singers |
| 2005 | Tiger by the Tail | TCB | With big band |
| 2007 | Pourquoi pas? Why Not? | | With big band |
| 2010? | Matterhorn Matters | | |
| 2012? | Dig My Trane – Coltrane's Vanguard Years (1961–1962) | | with the NDR Bigband and Tom Rainey |

Main sources:

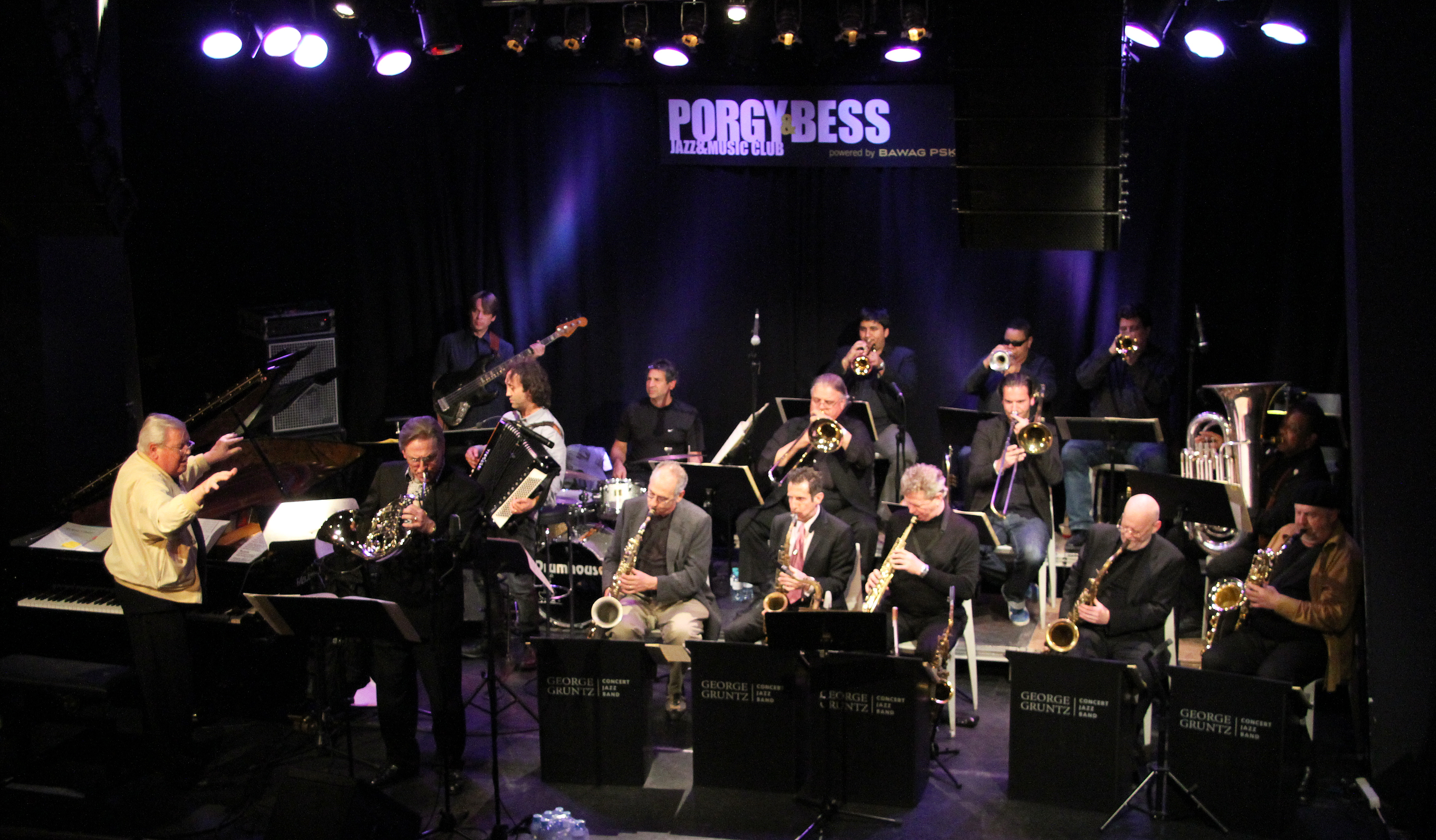
The George Gruntz Concert Jazz Band, 04.05.2011 in Vienna

=== Compilations ===
- Sins'n Wins'n Funs – Left-cores and Hard-core En-cores, 1981–1990 (Compilation, released 1996)
- The MPS Years, 1972–1981 (Compilation, released 1996)
- Renaissance Man a.k.a. 30 + 70: The One Hundred Years of George Gruntz, 1961–2000 (Compilation, released 2002)

=== As sideman ===
With Franco Ambrosetti

- Close Encounter (Enja, 1979)

== See also ==
- List of experimental big bands
