= Enja Records =

German jazz record company and label

- Founded: 1971; 54 years ago
- Founder: Matthias Winckelmann, Horst Weber
- Distributor(s): Enja Records
- Genre: Jazz
- Country of origin: Germany
- Location: Munich
- Official website: www.enjarecords.com/wordpress/

Enja Records is a German jazz record company and label based in Munich which was founded by jazz enthusiasts Matthias Winckelmann and Horst Weber in 1971.

The label's first release was by Mal Waldron, and early releases included European and Japanese avant-garde artists such as Alexander von Schlippenbach, Terumasa Hino, Albert Mangelsdorff and Yōsuke Yamashita, along with newer American jazz musicians like Archie Shepp, Cecil Taylor, Leroy Jenkins and Eric Dolphy and straight-ahead musicians such as Tommy Flanagan, McCoy Tyner, Chet Baker, Freddie Hubbard, Elvin Jones, and Kenny Barron. The label also branched out to release early world music productions from Abdullah Ibrahim, Rabih Abou-Khalil, Mahmoud Turkmani, Gypsy bands, Indonesia's Monica Akihary, and Turkish saz virtuoso Taner Akyol.

== Discography ==
=== Main series ===
Catalog	Artist	Album
2004	Mal Waldron	Black Glory
2006	Albert Mangelsdorff	Live in Tokyo
2008	Masahiko Satoh	Trinity
2010	Terumasa Hino	Vibrations
2012	Alexander von Schlippenbach	Payan
2016	Charles Tolliver	Impact
2018	Peter Warren	Bass Is
2020	Duško Gojković	After Hours
2022	Karl Berger	With Silence
2026	Dollar Brand	African Sketchbook
2028	Terumasa Hino	Taro's Mood
2030	Bobby Hutcherson, Harold Land, Bill Evans, Eddie Gomez, Archie Shepp, Karin Krog	Live at the Festival
2032	Dollar Brand	African Space Program
2034	Mal Waldron	Up Popped the Devil
2036	Elvin Jones	Live at the Village Vanguard
2038	Ben Webster	Live at Pio's
2040	Tete Montoliu	Songs for Love
2042	Makaya Ntshoko	Makaya & the Tsotsis
2044	Walter Norris	Drifting
2046	Bobby Jones	Hill Country Suite
2048	Dollar Brand	Good News from Africa
2050	Mal Waldron	Hard Talk
2052	Yōsuke Yamashita	Clay
2054	Booker Ervin	Lament for Booker Ervin
2056	Frank Tusa	Father Time
2058	Marc Levin	Social Sketches
2060	Pepper Adams	Julian
2062	Mal Waldron	A Touch of the Blues
2064	Albert Mangelsdorff	Spontaneous
2066	Manfred Schoof	Distant Thunder
2068	David Friedman	Futures Passed
2070	Dollar Brand	The Children of Africa
2072	Bob Degen	Sequoia Song
2074	Pepper Adams	Twelfth & Pingree
2076	Archie Shepp	Steam
2078	Attila Zoller	Dream Bells
2080	Yōsuke Yamashita	Banslikana
2082	Benny Bailey	Islands
2084	Cecil Taylor	Dark to Themselves
2086	Randy Weston	Nuit Africaine
2088	Tommy Flanagan	Eclypso
2090	Hal Galper	Now Hear This
2092	Mal Waldron with Steve Lacy	One-Upmanship
2094	New York Jazz Quartet	Surge
2096	David Friedman	Double Image
2098	Jeremy Steig and Eddie Gómez	Outlaws
3001	Yōsuke Yamashita	Inner Space
3003	Revolutionary Ensemble	Revolutionary Ensemble
3005	Cecil Taylor	Air Above Mountains
3007/09	Eric Dolphy	The Berlin Concerts
3011	Hannibal Marvin Peterson	Hannibal in Antibes
3013	John Scofield	John Scofield Live
3015	Bob Degen	Chartreuse
3017	Franco Ambrosetti Quintet with Bennie Wallace	Close Encounter
3019	Cecil McBee	Music from the Source
3021/23	Mal Waldron	Moods
3025	New York Jazz Quartet	Blues for Sarka
3027	Bob Degen	Children of the Night
3029	Bennie Wallace	The Fourteen Bar Blues
3031	Tommy Flanagan	Ballads & Blues
3033	John Scofield	Rough House
3035	Walter Norris and Aladár Pege	Synchronicity
3037	Joe Henderson	Barcelona
3039	Dollar Brand Quartet	Africa: Tears and Laughter
3041	Cecil McBee	Compassion
3043	Attila Zoller	Common Cause
3045	Bennie Wallace	Live at the Public Theater
3047	Abdullah Ibrahim (Dollar Brand) and Johnny Dyani	Echoes from Africa
3049	Charles Mingus	Mingus in Europe Volume I
3051	Attila Zoller	Conjunction
3053	Hal Galper	Ivory Forest
3055	Eric Dolphy	Stockholm Sessions
3057	Yōsuke Yamashita	A Tribute to Mal Waldron
3059	Tommy Flanagan	Super-Session
3061	Ken Werner	Beyond the Forest of Mirkwood
3063	Bennie Wallace	The Free Will
3065	David Liebman	The Opal Heart
3067	Walter Norris	Winter Rose
3069	Gil Evans	Blues in Orbit
3071	Mike Nock	Talisman
3073	Prince Lasha	Inside Story
3075	Mal Waldron	Mingus Lives
3077	Charles Mingus	Mingus in Europe Volume II
3079	Abdullah Ibrahim (Dollar Brand)	Live at Montreux
3081	Phil Woods, Tommy Flanagan and Red Mitchell	Three for All
3083	New York Jazz Quartet	Oasis
3085	Hannibal Marvin Peterson	The Angels of Atlanta
3087	Franco Ambrosetti	Heartbop
3089	David Friedman	Of the Wind's Eye
3091	Bennie Wallace	Bennie Wallace Plays Monk
3093	Gene Ammons	Gene Ammons in Sweden
3095	Freddie Hubbard	Outpost
3097	Eddie "Lockjaw" Davis	Jaw's Blues
3099	Hampton Hawes	Live at the Jazz Showcase, Chicago Vol.1
4002	Akira Sakata	Dance
4004	John Scofield	Shinola
4006	Hal Galper Quintet	Speak with a Single Voice
4008	Prince Lasha	Search for Tomorrow
4010	Mal Waldron	What It Is
4012	Aki Takase Trio	Song for Hope
4014	Tommy Flanagan	Confirmation
4016	Chet Baker	Peace
4018	Woody Shaw	Lotus Flower
4020	Pat Peterson	Introducing Pat Peterson
4022	Tommy Flanagan	Giant Steps
4024	Slickaphonics	Wow Bag
4026	Michael Gregory Jackson	Cowboys, Cartoons & Candy
4028	Bennie Wallace Trio and Chick Corea	Mystic Bridge
4030	Abdulla Ibrahim (Dollar Brand)	African Dawn
4032	Jon Hendricks	Cloudburst
4034	Aki Takase	Perdido
4036	Vyacheslav Ganelin	Non Troppo
4038	John Scofield	Out Like a Light
4040	Jerry González & The Fort Apache Band	The River Is Deep
4042	Tete Montoliu	Body & Soul
4044	Jane Ira Bloom	Mighty Lights
4046	Bennie Wallace	Big Jim's Tango
4048	Dusko Goykovich	Swinging Macedonia
4050	Archie Shepp	Soul Song
4052	Tommy Flanagan	Thelonica
4054	Subroto Roy Chodhury	Calcutta Meditation
4056	Abdulla Ibrahim (Dollar Brand)	Zimbabwe
4058	Red Mitchell	When I'm Singing
4060	Abbey Lincoln	Talking to the Sun
4062	Slickaphonics	Modern Life
4064	The Voodoo Gang	Return of the Turtle
4066	Luther Kent & The Trick Bag	It's in the Bag
4068	Franco Ambrosetti	Wings
4070	The Heartland Consort	The Heartland Consort
4072	Conexión Latina	Calorcito
4074	Max Roach	Long as You're Living
4076	Horace Parlan	Pannonica
4078	Bennie Wallace	Sweeping Through the City
4080	Takeo Moriyama	Green River
4082	Bobby Watson	Advance
4084	George Adams, Hannibal & Friends	More Sightings
4086	Mark Helias	Split Image
4088	Art Farmer	In Concert
4090	Charlie Rouse and Benny Bailey	The Upper Manhattan Jazz Society
4092	Kenny Barron	Scratch
4094	Enrico Pieranunzi	Autumn Song
4096	Franco Ambrosetti	Tentets
4098	Ray Anderson	Old Bottles - New Wine
5001	Blue Box	Sweet Machine
5003/4	Yōsuke Yamashita and Hōzan Yamamoto	Bolero
5005	Chet Baker	Strollin'
5007	Abdulla Ibrahim	South Africa
5009	Uli Lenz	Midnight Candy
5011	Clark Terry and Red Mitchell	The Duke and Basie
5013	Kenny Barron	What If?
5015	John Stubblefield	Bushman Song
5017	David Friedman	Shades of Change
5019	Herb Geller	Birdland Stomp
5021	Mal Waldron	Mal Waldron Plays the Blues
5023	Conexión Latina	Un Poco Loco
5025	Blue Box	Stambul Boogie
5027	Attila Zoller	Memories of Pannonia
5029	Hal Galper	Dreamsville
5031	Nana Simopoulos	Wings and Air
5033	Marty Cook	Nightworks
5035	Franco Ambrosetti and Friends	Movies
5037	Ray Anderson	It Just So Happens
5039	Michele Rosewoman	Quintessence
5041	Mark Helias	The Current Set
5043	Jim Pepper	Dakota Song
5045	Eric Dolphy	Vintage Dolphy
5047	Gary Thomas	Seventh Quadrant
5049	Joint Venture	Joint Venture
5051	John Stubblefield	Countin' the Blues
5053	Attila Zoller	Overcome
5055	Daniel Schnyder	Secret Cosmos
5057	Reflexionen	Remember to Remember
5059	Albert Mangelsdorff and Lee Konitz	Art of the Duo
5061	Gust William Tsilis and Arthur Blythe	Pale Fire
5063	Nels Cline	Angelica
5065	Marty Ehrlich	Pliant Plaint
5067	Marty Cook	Red White Black and Blue
5069	Gunther Klatt & Elephantrombones	Live at Leverkusen
5071	Kenny Barron	Live at Fat Tuesdays
5073	Abdullah Ibrahim	Mindif
5075	Maria João and Aki Takase	Looking for Love
5077	Barbara Dennerlein	Straight Ahead
5079	Franco Ambrosetti	Movies Too
5081	Ray Anderson	Blues Bred in the Bone
5083	Heinz Sauer	Cherry Bat
5085	Gary Thomas	Code Violations
5087	Jim Pepper	The Path
5089	Stanton Davis	Manhattan Melody
5091	Michele Rosewoman and Quintessesnce	Contrast High
5093	Leni Stern	Secrets
5095	Jerry González & Fort Apache Band	Obalata
5097	Chet Baker	My Favourite Songs
5099	Mitch Watkins	Underneath It All
6002	Daniel Schnyder	The City
6004	George Gruntz Concert Band	First Prize
6006	Herb Geller	A Jazz Song Book
6008	Uli Lenz	Live at Sweet Basil
6010	Nana Simopoulos	Still Waters
6012	Abbey Lincoln	Abbey Sings Billie
6014	Klaus König Orchestra	Times of Devastation/Poco a Poco
6016	Mark Helias	Desert Blue
6018	Abdullah Ibrahim & Ekaya	African River
6020	Chet Baker	Straight from the Heart
6022	Sathima Bea Benjamin	Love Light
6024	Marty Ehrlich	The Traveller's Tale
6026	Leszek Żądło	Breath
6028	Hampton Hawes	Live at the Showcase, Chicago Vol. 2
6030	Mordy Ferber	All the Way to Sendai
6032	Michael Formanek	Wide Open Space
6034	Leni Stern	Phoenix
6036	Daniel Schnyder	European Suite
6038	George Gruntz Trio	Serious Fun
6040	John D'earth	One Bright Glance
6042	Clark Terry and Red Mitchell	Jive at Five
6044	Dizzy Gillespie	Live at the Royal Festival Hall
6046	Peter O'Mara	Avenue "U"
6048	Wayne Krantz	Signals
6050	Barbara Dennerlein	Hot Stuff
6052	Joint Venture	Ways
6054	Mitch Watkins	Curves
6056	Association Urbanique	Don't Look Back
6058	Tony Reedus	Incognito
6062	Aki Takase	Shima Shoka
6064	Michael Marcus	Under the Wire
6066	Bud Revels	Survivors
6068	Eddie Harris	There Was a Time: Echo of Harlem
6070	Franco Ambrosetti	Music for Symphony and Jazz Band
6072	The George Gruntz Concert Jazz Band	Blues 'n Dues Et Cetera
6074	Chet Baker	The Last Great Concert
6076	Itchy Fingers	Live
6078	Klaus König Orchestra	At the End of the Universe
6080	McCoy Tyner	Remembering John
6082	Bobby Previte	Weather Clear, Track Fast
6084	Kenny Barron Quintet	Quickstep
6086	Oliver Jones	Northern Summit
6088	Arthur Blythe	Hipmotism
6090	Rabih Abou-Khalil	Al-Jadida
6092	Marty Ehrlich	Side by Side
6094	Gust William Tsilis	Sequestered Days
6096	Maria João, Aki Takase and Niels Pedersen	Alice
6098	Nels Cline Trio	Silencer
7000	Various Artists	20th Anniversary!
7001	Maria João & Grupo Cal Viva	Sol
7003	Daniel Schnyder	Mythology
7005	Ivo Perelman	The Children of Ibeji
7007	Archie Shepp and Richard Davis	Body and Soul
7009	Elvin Jones	In Europe
7011	Abdullah Ibrahim	Desert Flowers
7013	Joe Lovano	Sounds of Joy
7015	Sathima Bea Benjamin	Southern Touch
7017	Art Taylor	Mr. A.T.
7019	Mark Helias	Attack the Future
7021/22	Max Roach	To the Max!
7023	Philip Catherine and Niels-Henning Ørsted Pedersen	Spanish Nights
7025	Freddie Hubbard	Topsy – Standard Book
7027	Nat Adderley Quintet featuring Vincent Herring	The Old Country
7029	Karl Berger, Dave Holland, Ed Blackwell	Crystal Fire
7031	Pierre Dørge's New Jungle Orchestra featuring David Murray	The Jazzpar Prize
7033	John Tchicai and Vitold Rek	Satisfaction
7035	Peter Schärli Quintet with Glenn Ferris	Tomorrow
7037	Abbey Lincoln	Abbey Sings Billie Volume 2
7039	Aki Takase and David Murray	Blue Monk
7041	Michael Formanek	Extended Animation
7043	Barbara Dennerlein	That's Me
7045	Willie Williams	Spirit Willie
7047	Art Farmer	Soul Eyes
7049	Joint Venture	Mirrors
7051	Elvin Jones	Youngblood
7053	Rabih Abou-Khalil	Blue Camel
7055	Conexión Latina	Mambo 2000: Live
7057	Klaus König	The Song of Songs
7059	Oliver Jones	A Class Act
7061	Chris Connor	As Time Goes By
7063	Simon Nabatov Trio	Tough Customer
7065	Franco Ambrosetti	Live at the Blue Note
7067	Roy Brooks	Duet in Detroit
7069	Michele Rosewoman	Harvest
7071	Sun Ra and His Omniverse Arkestra	Destination Unknown
7073	Dewey Redman	Choices
7075	Aki Takase	Close Up of Japan
7077	Peter O'Mara	Stairway
7079	Eddie Harris Funk Project	Listen Here!
7081	Elvin Jones and Takehisa Tanaka	When I Was at Aso-Mountain
7083	Rabih Abou-Khalil	Tarab
7085	Itchy Fingers	Full English Breakfast
7087	Mike Westbrook Orchestra	The Cortège
7089	Ed Blackwell Project	What It Is? Ed Blackwell Project Vol. 1
7091	Bennie Wallace	The Talk of the Town
7093	Gust William Tsilis	Wood Music
7095	Elvin Jones	Going Home
7097	Kevin Mahogany	Double Rainbow
7099	Wayne Krantz	Long to Be Loose
8000	Various Artists	Trumpets in Modern Jazz
8002	Hermann Breuer and Carolyn Breuer	Family Affair
8004	Eddie Allen	Another's Point of View
8006	Dan Rose	Conversations
8008	Various Artists	Art of the Duo
8010	Bruce Barth Quintet	In Focus
8012	Abdu Dagir	Malik At-Taqasim
8014	Sachi Hayasaka & Stir Up!	2.26
8016	Neils Pederson and Philip Catherine	Art of the Duo
8018	Albert Sarko	Blues and Views
8020	Ronald Muldrow	Yesterdays
8022	Adrian Mears & Johannes Enders Quintet	Discoveries
8024	Ingrid Sertso	Dance with It
8026	Porter-Praskin Quartet with Sal Nistico	Sonnet for Sal
8028	Hornstein Trio	Langsames Blau
8030	Motohiko Hino	It's There
8032	Akio Sasajim	Humpty Dumpty
8034	The Enja Band	Live at Sweet Basil
8036	John Stubblefield	Morning Song
8038	Greetje Bijma	Barefoot
8040	Tommy Flanagan	Let's Play the Music of Thad Jones
8042	Diana Krall	Stepping Out
8044	Dusko Goykovich	Soul Connection
8045	Dusko Goykovich	Soul Connection Vol. II
8046	Arthur Blythe	Retroflection
8048	Maria Schneider Jazz Orchestra	Evanesecence
8050	Michael Formanek	Low Profile
8052	Marty Ehrlich	Can I Hear a Motion
8054	Ed Blackwell Project	What It Be Like? Ed Blackwell Project Vol. 2
8056	Terumasa Hino, Masahiko Togashi and Masabumi Kikuchi	Triple Helix
8058	Hal Galper	Just Us
8060	Willie Williams	WW3
8062	Oliver Jones	Just 88
8064	Bobby Previte's Weather Clear, Track Fast	Hue and Cry
8066	Elvin Jones	It Don't Mean a Thing
8068	Daniel Schnyder	Nucleus
8070	Ray Anderson Alligatory Band	Don't Mow Your Lawn
8072	Kevin Mahogany	Songs and Moments
8074	Abraham Burton	Closest to the Sun
8076	Klaus König Orchestra	Time Fragments
8078	Rabih Abou-Khalil	The Sultan's Picnic
8080	Junior Mance	Softly as in a Morning Sunrise
8082	Cornelius Claudio Kreusch	The Vision
8084	Bruce Barth	Morning Call
8086	Ronald Muldrow	Diaspora
8088	Glenn Ferris, Vincent Seagal and Bruno Rousselet	Flesh and Stone
8090	Aki Takase Trio	Clapping Music
8092	Larry Porter	March Blues
8094	Sunny Murray Trio	13 Steps on Glass
8096	Michael Bocian Quartet	Reverence
8098	Amiri Baraka	Real Song
9000	Various Artists	The Music Universe
9001	Rudy Linka	Čzech It Out!
9003	Michael Riessler	Momentum Mobile
9005	Allen Lowe and Roswell Rudd	Woyzeck's Death
9007	Jerry Hahn	Time Changes
9009	Coleman Hawkins	Supreme
9011	Double Trio	Green Dolphy Suite
9013	Ingrid Jensen	Vernal Fields
9015	Dusko Goykovich	Bebop City
9017	Ferenc Snétnberger	Signature
9019	The Cuban All-Stars	Pasaporte
9021	Chet Baker & the NDR Big Band	The Legacy Vol. 1
9023	Marc Cary	Cary On!
9025	Marty Ehrlich	New York Child
9027	Flavio Ambrosetti	Anniversary
9029	Hal Galper	Rebop
9031	Attila Zoller	When It's Time
9033	Eddie Allen	R 'n' B
9035	Fred Hersch	Point in Time
9037	Abraham Burton	The Magician
9039	Kevin Mahogany	You Got What It Takes
9041	Mel Martiny	Mel Martin Plays Benny Carter
9043	Wayne Krantz	2 Drink Minimum
9045	Matthias Schubert	Blue and Grey Suite
9047	Dusko Goykovich	The Balkan Connection
9049	Mark Helias	Loopin' the Cool
9051	Arthur Blythe	Calling the Card
9053	Gail Thompson	Jazz Africa
9055	Ray Anderson Alligatory Band	Heads and Tales
9057	Renaud Garcia-Fons	Alborea
9059	Rabih Abou-Khalil	Arabian Waltz
9061	Klaus König	Reviews
9063	Jasper Van't Hoff, Greetje Bijma and Pierre Favre	Freezing Screens
9065	Conexión Latina	La Conexion
9067	Jonny King	Notes from the Underground
9069	Maria Schneider Orchestra	Coming About
9071	Michel Godard, Miroslav Tadić and Mark Nauseef	Loose Wires
9073	Carlos Martins Quarteto featuring Cindy Blackman	Passagem
9075	Bobby Watson	Advance
9077	Chet Baker	I Remember You: The Legacy Vol. 2
9079	Pepper Adams	Pepper
9081	Eddie Harris	Dancing by a Rainbow
9083	Roman Bunka	Color Me Cairo
9085	Junior Mance	Junior Mance at Town Hall Vol. I
9087	Cornelius Claudio Kreusch Quartet	Black Mud Sound
9089	Glenn Ferris	Face Lift
9091	Odean Pope Trio	Ninety-Six
9093	Babamadu	Babamadu
9099	Michael Hornstein	Innocent Green
9101	Aki Takase Septet	Oriental Express
9102	Aldo Romano	Canzoni
9103	Peter Schärli	Blues for the Beast
9104	Alexander von Schlippenbach	Light Blue: Schlippenbach Plays Monk
9105	Johannes Enders	Home Ground
9106	Scales Brothers	Our House
9107	Marty Cook	Theory of Strange
9108	Glenn Ferris Trio	Refugees
9109	Aki Takase and Rudi Mahall	Duet for Eric Dolphy
9111	Laurent Coq	Jaywalker
9112	Voodoo Gang	Return of the Turtle
9113	Art Farmer	In Europe
9114	Junior Mance	Nadja
9115	Pepper Adams	Julian
9116	Dan Rose	The Water's Rising
9117	Misery Loves Company	Athens Meets New York
9118	Michael Bocian	Premonition: Solo Debut for Nylon String Guitar
9120	Jürgen Seefelder	Straight Horn
9122	Le Petit Chien	Woof
9124	Adrian Mears	All for One
9125	Monk'O Marok	Din Din Dan
9126	Peter O'Mara	Back Seat Driver
9127	Bennie Wallace, Eddie Gómez and Dannie Richmond	Live at the Public Theater
9128	Charlie Mariano and Quique Sinesi	Tango Para Charlie
9129	Peter Schärli Special Septet	Guilty
9130	Aki Takase	St. Louis Blues
9131	Prince Lasha	Inside Story
9132	Glenn Ferris Trio	Chrominance
9133	Dave Bargeron and Michel Godard	Tuba Tuba
9134	Abbey Lincoln	Abbey Sings Billie Vol. I + II
9135	Christoph Stiefel Trio	Dream of the Camel
9136	Zollsound Chamber Orchestra	Songs Closer to Silence
9137	Adel Salameh and Naziha Azzouz	Kanza
9138	Monk'O Marok	Au Plafond!
9139	Akira Sakata and Harpacticoida	La Mer
9140	Susu Hyldgaard	Home Sweet Home
9141	Archie Shepp and Mal Waldron	Left Alone Revisited
9142	Azhar Kamal	Me Rio
9143	Underkarl	Second Brain
9144	Karin Krog	Where You At?
9145	Pablo Ziegler and Quique Sinesi	Bajo Cero
9147	Mal Waldron	Up Popped the Devil
9148	Michel Godard and Dave Bargeron	Tuba Tuba Tu
9149	Nils Wogram's Root 70	Getting Rooted
9150	Monk'O Marok	Exotics & Specials
9151	Underkarl	Freemix
9152	Aki Takase	Aki Takase Plays Fats Waller
9153	Adel Salameh	Hafla
9154	Pat Peterson	Do It Now
9155	Borda / Bunka / Hecker	Orientación
9156	Dalia Faitelson	Movable Clouds
9157	Michy Mano	The Cool Side Of The Pillow
9158	Silvana Deluigi	Yo!
9162	Aki Takase and The Good Boys	Procreation
9164	Aldo Romano Jazzpat Quintet + 1	The Jazzpar Prize
9165	Susi Hyldgaard	Blush
9166	Nils Wogram Septet	Swing Moral
9176	Billy Hart Trio	Route F
9183	Klima Kalima	Chasing Yellow
9184	Sebastian Gramss Underkarl	Goldberg
9188	Aki Takase	Something Sweet, Something Tender
9191	Louisa Bey	Turning Me Jazz
9195	Various Artists	El Último Aplauso: Life Is a Tango (Soundtrack)
9196	Isabelle Olivier	My Foolish Harp
9197	Glen Ferris, Bruno Rousselet and Ernie Odoom	Ferris Wheel
9198	Klima Kalima	Loru
9199	Lisa Wahlandt	Stay a While
9300	Various Artists	The Enja World of Jazz Ballads
9301	Rudy Linka	Always Double Czech!
9302	Daniel Schnyder	Tarantula
9303	Michael Riessler	Sur Prise
9304	Lee Konitz	Strings for Holiday
9305	Various Artists	Ballads
9306	Bobby Previte	Too Close to the Pole
9307	Nils Wogram	Round Trip
9308	Michael Formanek Quartet	Nature of the Beast
9309	Sathima Bea Benjamin	A Morning in Paris
9310	Dan Wall	Off the Wall
9311	Victor Lewis	Eeeyyess
9312	James Emery	Standing on a Whale Fishing for Minnows
9313	Ingrid Jensen	Here on Earth
9314	Renaud Garcia-Fons	Legends
9315	Karl Ratzer	Saturn Returning
9316	Kevin Mahogany	Pussy Cat Dues
9317	Jenny Evans	Shiny Stockings
9318	David Murray	Fo Deuk Revue
9320	Dusko Goykovich	Balkan Blue
9321	Benny Waters	Birdland Birthday Live at 95
9322	Bassdrumbone	Hence the Reason
9323	Sylvie Courvoisier	Ocre
9324	Bobby Previte	Dangerous Rip
9326	Banda Città Ruvo di Puglia	La Banda
9327	Robert Dick and the Soldier String Quartet	Jazz Standards on Mars
9328	Tyler Mitchell	Tribute to Art
9329	Jonny King	The Meltdown
9330	Rabih Abou-Khalil	Odd Times
9331	Franco Ambrosetti	Light Breeze
9332	Bob Degen	Catability
9333	Mike Westbrook Orchestra	Bar Utopia
9334	Renaud Garcia-Fons	Oriental Bass
9335	Melissa Walker	May I Feel
9336	Eddie Harris and Wendell Harrison	The Battle of the Tenors
9338	Klaus König	The H.e.a.r.t. Project
9339	Gail Thompson	Jadu
9340	Ray Anderson Lapis Lazuli Band	Funkorific
9341	Marty Ehrlich, Peter Erskine and Michael Formanek	Relativity
9343	Marc Ducret and Bobby Previte	In the Grass
9344	James Emery	Spectral Domains
9345	Antonio Faraò	Black Inside
9346	Nils Wogram	Speed Life
9347	Stephen Scott	Vision Quest
9348	Bobby Previte	My Man in Sydney
9350	Various Artists	Ballads in Blue
9351	Lee Konitz, Steve Swallow and Paul Motian	Three Guys
9352	Johannes Enders	Bright Nights
9353	Ingrid Jensen	Higher Grounds
9354	David Azarian	Hope
9355	David Murray	Creole Project
9356	Bennie Wallace	Someone to Watch Over Me
9357	Karl Ratzer	Moon Dancer
9358	Mike Westbrook	The Orchestra of Smith's Academy
9359	Louis Sclavis Bernard Struber Jazztet	Le Phare
9360	Rabih Abou-Khalil	Yara
9361	ADD Trio	Sic Bisquitus Disintegrat
9362	Michel Godard	Castel del Monte
9363	Jenny Evans	Girl Talk
9364	Renaud Garcia-Fons and Jean-Louis Matinier	Fuera
9365	Melissa Walker	Moment of Truth
9366	Ray Anderson Pocket Brass Band	Where Home Is
9367	Dhafer Youssef	Malak
9368	Andreas Willers Octet	The Ground Music
9369	Daniel Schnyder	Words Within Music
9370	David Murray	Speaking in Tongues
9371	Rabih Abou-Khalil	Between Dusk and Dawn
9372	Rabih Abou-Khalil	Bukra
9373	Rabih Abou-Khalil	Roots and Sprouts
9374	Albert Mangelsdorff & Movin' On	Shake, Shuffle & Blow
9376	Mike Westbrook Glad Days	Settings of William Blake
9377	Abraham Burton Eric McPherson Quartet	Cause and Effect
9378	Michele Rosewoman and Quintessesnce	Guardians of the Light
9379	Franco Ambrosetti	Grazie Italia
9380	Vincent Courtois	Translucide
9381	Lázaro Ros and Conjunto Sol Naciente	Ori Batá
9382	Satoko Fujii	Toward, "To West"
9383	Sylvie Couviosier and Ocre	Y2K
9384	Gianluigi Trovesi	Round About a Midsummer's Dream
9385	Mark Feldman	Book of Tells
9386	Carlos Bica and Azul	Twist
9387	Ferenc Snétberger	For My People
9388	Eddie Allen Quintet	Summer Days
9389	Dave Liebman	Time Immemorial
9390	Johannes Enders	Quiet Fire
9391	Klaus König	Songs & Solos
9392	Josh Roseman	Cherry
9393	Maria Schneider Orchestra	Allégresse
9394	Absolute Ensemble and Kristjan Järvi	Absolution
9395	Paquito D'Rivera	Habanera
9396	Marty Ehrlich	Song
9397	Fabien Tehericsen	Le Concerto Improvise
9398	Antoine Hervé	Invention Is You
9399	Antonio Farao	Thorn
9400	Various Artists	The More We Know
9401	Rabih Abou-Khalil	The Cactus of Knowledge
9402	Conexión Latina	Mambo Nights
9403	Jenny Evans	Gonna Go Fishin'
9404	Antonio Hart	Ama Tu Sonrisa
9405	Italian Instabile Orchestra	Litania Sibilante
9406	David Murray	Octet Plays Trane
9407	Benny Bailey	The Satchmo Legacy
9408	Dusko Goykovich	In My Dreams
9409	Melissa Walker	I Saw the Sky
9410	Abdullah Ibrahim	African Symphony
9411	Vincent Courtois	The Fitting Room
9412	Dhafer Youssef	Electric Sufi
9413	Mark Helias' Open Loose	New School
9414	Carlo Bica and Ana Brandao	Diz
9416	Nils Wogram	Odd and Awkward
9417	Ensemble Indigo	Reflection
9418	Renaud Garcia-Fons	Navigatore
9419	Gianluigi Trovesi	Dedalo
9420	New Art Saxophone Quartet	Songs and Dances
9421	Joe Gallardo's Latino Blue	A Latin Shade of Blue
9422	David Klein Quintet	My Marilyn
9423	Charlie Mariano	Deep in a Dream
9424	Trio Ivoire	Trio Ivoire
9425	Bennie Wallace	In Berlin
9427	Dusko Goykovich	Portrait
9428	Klaus König	Black Moments
9429	Franco Ambrosetti	European Legacy
9430	Antonio Farao	Next Stories
9431	Michel Godard	Castel del Monte II
9432	Ferenc Snétberger	Balance
9433	Enders Room	Monolith
9434	Stefanie Schlesinger	What Love Is
9435	The Styrenes, Terry Riley	In C
9436	Troubadours United	Road of the Troubadours
9437	Josh Roseman Unit	Treats for the Nightwalker
9438	Joanna MacGregor	Play
9440	Rabih Abou-Khalil	Il Sospiro
9441	Gabriele Mirabassi	Latakia Blend
9442	Ekrem & Gypsy Groovz	Rivers of Happiness
9444	Maria Schneider Orchestra	Days of Wine and Roses: Live at the Jazz Standard
9447	Mahmoud Turkmani	Fayka
9448	Karl Ratzer and The Night Club Band	All the Way
9449	Kristjan Järvi	Absolute Fix
9450	Various Artists	Ballads 3
9451	Myriam Alter	If
9452	Marty Ehrlich	The Long View
9453	Chet Baker	Oh You Crazy Moon
9454	Jean-Louis Matinier	Confluences
9456	Mike Westbrook	Chanson Irresponsible
9457	Satoko Fujii Orchestra	The Future of the Past
9458	Carlo Bica & Azul	Look What They've Done to My Song
9459	Sandra Weckert	Bar Jazz
9460	Daniel Schnyder	Colossus of Sound
9461	Daniel Grossman and Jochen Striebeck	Through Roses
9462	Rabih Abou-Khalil	Morton's Foot
9463	Luciano Biondini and Javier Girotto	Terra Madre
9464	Renaud Garcia-Fons	Entrmundo
9465	Cecil Taylor and the Italian Instabile Orchestra	The Owner of the River Bank
9466	Gutbucket	Dry Humping the American Dream
9467	Jenny Evans	Nuages
9468	Markus Stockhausen, Ferenc Snétberger, Arild Andersen and Patrice Heral	Joyosa
9469	Bennie Wallace	The Nearness of You
9470	Stefanie Schlesinger	Angel Eyes
9471	Rosanna & Zelia	Aguas=Iguais
9472	Boi Akih	Uwai
9473	Dusko Goykovich	Samba do Mar
9474	Matt Darriau Paradox Trio with Theodosii Spassov	Gambit
9475	Mahmoud Turkmani	Zakira
9476	Abdullah Ibrahim	A Celebration
9479	Rabih Abou-Khalil	Journey to the Centre of an Egg
9480	Pino Minafra	Terronia
9481	Jenny Evans	Christmas Songs
9482	Dusko Goykovich	A Handful o' Soul
9485	Ferenc Snétberger Trio	Nomad
9486	Franco Ambrosetti	Liquid Gardens
9487	Boi Akih	Yalelol
9488	Trio Elf	Elf
9489	Dusko Goykovich	Samba Tzigane
9492	Florian Weber	Minsarah
9493	Carlos Bica & Azul	Believer
9494	Rabih Abou-Khalil	Songs for Sad Women
9499	Roberto Fonseca	Zamazu
9500	Various Artists	Ballads 4 the World
9501	Alvin Queen	I Ain't Looking at You
9502	Celine Rudolph	Brazaventure
9503	Elisabeth Kontomanou	Waitin' for Spring
9504	Various Artists	Al Tarab: Muscat ʿŪd Festival
9505	Various Artists	Ballads: Take Five
9506	Bennie Wallace	Disorder at the Border
9507	Charlie Mariano with Cholet Känzig Papaux Trio	Silver Blue
9508	Various Artists	Al Tarab: Muscat ʿŪd Festival
9509	Luciano Biondini	Prima del Cuore
9510	Taner Akyol	Birds of Passage
9511	Ferenc Snétberger and Markus Stockhausen	Streams
9512	Olaf Kübler & Jan Hammer Trio	Turtles
9513	Myriam Alter	Where Is There
9515	Benjamin Schaefer Trio	Roots and Wings
9516	Jobic Le Masson Trio	Hill
9517	Lee Konitz and Minsarah	Deep Lee
9518	Afonso Pais Trio featuring Edu Lobo	Subsequências
9520	Rabih Abou-Khalil	Em Português
9521	Livio Minafra	La Fiamma e il Cristallo
9522	Alvin Queen	Mighty Long Way
9523	Alony	Dismantling Dreams
9524	Chet Baker	Chet in Chicago
9525	Rabih Abou-Khalil	Selection
9526	Jenny Evans	Lunar Tunes
9527	Renaud Garcia-Fons	La Linea del Sur
9528	Anke Helferich	Stormproof
9530	Mahmound Turkmani	Ya Sharr Mout
9532	Charlie Mariano, Philip Catherine and Jasper Van't Hof	The Great Concert
9533	Angelika Niescier	Sublim III
9534	Roberto Fonseca	Akokan
9535	Celine Rudolph	Metamorflores
9536	Michael Riessler, Howard Levy and Jean-Louis Matinier	Silver & Black
9537	Pascal Schumacher Quartet	Here We Gong
9538	Trio Ivoire with Chicwoniso	Across the Oceans
9540	Lucien Dubuis Trio and Marc Ribot	Ultime Cosmos
9542	Lee Konitz New Quartet	Live at the Village Vanguard
9543	Dusko Goykovich	5ive Horns & Rhythm
9545	Minsarah	Blurring the Lines
9546	Pascal Schumacher and Jef Neve	Face to Face
9548	Manhattan Brass	New York Now
9550	Various Artists	Nu Ballads
9551	Dejan Terzić Underground	Diaspora
9552	Peter Materna Trio	The Dancer
9555	Joseph Tawadros	The Hour of Separation
9556	Benjamin Schaefer	Beneath the Surface
9558	The Rosenberg Trio with Biréli Lagrène	Djangologists
9559	Florin Niculescu	Django Tunes
9560	Rabih Abou-Khalil	Trouble in Jerusalem
9562	Trio Elf	Elfland
9563	Renaud Garcia-Fons	Méditerranées
9565	Roberto Fonseca	Live in Marciac
9566	Ring Ensemble	Ring Ensemble
9567	Bob Degen	Jake Remembered
9568	Nels Cline Trio	Silencer
9569	Doumka Clarinet Ensemble	Afar
9570	Subtone	Morningside
9571	Absolute Ensemble and Kristjan Järvi	Arabian Nights: Live at Town Hall NYC
9573	Malcolm Braff Trio	Inside
9574	Angelika Niescier, Thomas Morgan and Tyshawn Sorey	Quite Simply
9575	Rez Abbasi's Invocation	Suno Suno
9576	Franco Ambrosetti	Cycladic Moods
9577	Nels Cline	Angelica
9578	Livio Minafra 4et	Surprise!!!
9581	Renaud Garcia-Fons	Solo: The Marcevol Concert
9582	Albare Itd	Long Way
9583	Toufic Farroukh	Cinéma Beyrouth
9584	Waldemar Bastos	Classics of My Soul
9585	Monika Roscher Bigband	Failure in Wonderland
9586	Florian Weber	Biosphere
9587	Mike Westbrook Orchestra	The Cortège
9589	Reut Regev's R*Time	Exploring the Vibe
9590	Mirim Klein	By Myself
9591	Rez Abbasi Trio	Continuous Beat
9594	Quest	Circular Dreaming
9596	Dejan Terzić	Melanoia
9599	Kim Barth and Mike Mossman	Late Night Coffee
9602	Trio Elf	Amsterdam
9603	Alon Nechushtan	Venture Bound
9604	Äl Jawala	Live
9605	Trio Elf	RMXD
9606	Dusko Goykovich with Strings	The Brandenburg Concert
9608	Renaud Garcia-Fons	Beyond the Double Bass
9609	Lee Konitz	Standards Live ~ At The Village Vanguard
9610	Organ Explosion	Organ Explosion
9612	Le Café Bleu International	Plays Edith Piaf
9613	Booom	Music from Videogames
9614	Eva Klesse Quartet	Xenon
9615	Florian Weber, Donny McCaslin and Dan Weiss	Criss Cross
9616	Le Café Bleu International	Tells Bedtime Stories
9617	Cristina Braga & Brandenburger Symphoniker	Whisper
9618	Anke Helfrich Trio featuring Tim Hagans	Dedication
9619	Holger Scheidt Group	The Tides of Life
9620	Various Artists	Message to Attila: The Music of Attila Zoller
9621	Rez Abbasi	Intents and Purposes
9624	Franco Ambrosetti	After the Rain
9625	Andi Kissenbeck's Club Boogaloo	Monsoon Dance
9626	Myriam Alter	Cross / Ways
9627	Bob Dorough Trio featuring Michael Hornstein	But For Now
9628	Matthias Lindermayr	Lang Tang
9630	Dejan Terzic Melanoia	Labyrinth
9631	Vladimir Kostadinović	The Left Side of Life
9632	Jasmin Bayer	Summer Melodies
9634	Organ Explosion	Level 2
9635	Monika Roscher Bigband	Of Monsters and Birds
9636	Anna-Lena Schnabel Quartet	Books, Bottles & Bamboo
9637	Gianni Iorio and Pasquale Stafano	Nocturno
9642	The World Peace Trio	The World Peace Trion
9643	Eva Klesse Quartett	Obenland
9644	Jobic Le Masson Trio + Steve Potts	Song
9645	Csaba Toth Bagi	Balkan Union
9650	Matthieu Bordenave Grand Angle	Terre de Sienne
9654	Various Artists	The Exciting Jazz of the Early Seventies
9655	Franco Ambrosetti	Cheers
9679	Gianni Iorio and Pasquale Stafano	Mediterranean Tales

- 9902 2 Mal Waldron / Steve Lacy: One-Upmanship / Moods
- 9904 2 Bob Degen: Sequoia Song / Chartreuse
- 9906 2 Clark Terry / Red Mitchell: To Duke & Basie / When I'm Singing
- 9908 2 Hal Galper: Now Hear This / Ivory Forest
- 9910 2 Abdullah Ibrahim: Banyana – Children of Africa / Desert Flowers
- 9912 2 Benny Bailey: Islands / Upper Manhattan Jazz Society
- 9914 2 Franco Ambrosetti: Heart Bop / Close Encounter
- 9916 2 David Friedman: Future Passed / Of the Wind's Eye
- 9918 2 John Stubblefield: Bushman Song / Countin' on the Blues
- 9920 2 Attila Zoller: Cream Bells / Memories of Pannonica
- 9922 2 Kenny Barron: What If? / Live at Fat Tuesdays
- 9924 2 Ray Anderson/Slickaphonics: Wow Bag / Modern Life
- 9926 2 Conexion Latina: Calorcito / Un Poco Loco
- 9928 2 Jerry Gonzalez & Forth Apache Band The River Is Deep / Obatala
- 9930 2 Leni Stern: Secrets / Closer to the Light
- 9932 2 Ed Blackwell: What It Is / What It Be Like

=== Other series ===
- blu-1000 2 Robert Pete Williams: Sugarfarm
- blu-1001 2 Thomas Shaw: Do Lord Remember Me
- blu-1002 2 Little Brother Montgomery: Bajez Copper Station
- blu-1003 2 Bukka White: Baton Rouge Mosby Street
- blu-1004 2 Eddie Taylor: Stormy Monday
- blu-1005 2 Montreal Jubilation Gospel Choir: Highway to Heaven
- blu-1006 2 Montreal Jubilation Gospel Choir: Jubilation Ii
- blu-1007 2 Christian Willisohn: Boogie Woogie & Blues
- blu-1008 2 Montreal Jubilation Gospel Choir Glory Train
- blu-1009 2 Stephen Barry Blues Band: Blues Under a Full Moon
- blu-1010 2 Louisiana Red & Carey Bell Live At 55
- blu-1011 2 Lillian Bouté & Christian Willisohn: Lipstick Traces
- blu-1012 2 Bryan Lee Jump Street Five
- blu-1013 2 Nick Woodland: Big Heart
- blu-1014 2 Montreal Jubilation Gospel Choir A Cappella
- blu-1015 2 Montreal Jubilation Gospel Choir Anniversary in Gospel
- blu-1016 2 Yvonne Jackson W. Maceo Parker: I'm Trouble
- blu-1017 2 Lillian Boutté: The Gospel Book
- blu-1018 2 Montreal Jubilation Gospel Choir: Joy to the World
- blu-1019 2 Christian Willisohn: Blues News
- blu-1020 2 Lillian Boutté: The Jazz Book
- blu-1021 2 Bryan Lee: Memphis Bound
- blu-1022 2 Montreal Jubilation Gospel Choir Looking Back (Jubilation Vi)
- blu-1024 2 Al Jones Blues Band: Watch This!
- blu-1025 2 Christian Willisohn Trio: Blues on the World
- blu-1026 2 Christian Willisohn New Band: Heart Broken Man
- blu-1027 2 Nick Woodland Quartet Live Fireworks
- blu-1028 2 Montreal Jubilation Gospel Choir Hamba Ekhaya
- blu-1029 2 Bryan Lee Live at the Old Absinthe House Bar – Friday Night
- blu-1031 2 Big Allanbik Batuque Y Blues
- blu-1032 2 Bryan Lee Live at the Old Absinthe House Bar – Saturday Night
- blu-1033 2 Marty Hall: Who's Been Talkin'?
- blu-1035 2 Bryan Lee: Crawfish Lady
- blu-1036 2 Nick Woodland: The Current That Flows
- blu-1037 2 Nick Woodland Cult Factory Vol. 1 (Authentic Heads)
- m M P-1 70886 2 Rabih Abou-Khalil: Between Dusk and Dawn
- m M P-1 70889 2 Rabih Abou-Khalil: Bukra
- m M P-1 70890 2 Rabih Abou-Khalil: Roots and Sprouts
- r27-9153 2 Harvie Swartz: In a Different Light
- r27-9154 2 Bebop & Beyond W. Joe Henderson Plays Thelonious Monk
- r27-9163 2 Tim Eyermann & East Coast Off. Outside Inside
- r27-9167 2 David Becker: In Motion
- r27-9169 2 Uncle Festive The Paper & The Dog
- r27-9170 2 Dizzy Gillespie / Bebop & Beyond Plays Dizzy Gillespie
- r27-9171 2 Mark Egan: Beyond Words
- r27-9180 2 Scott Henderson /tribal Tech Illicit*tip-888801 2 Blue Box Captured Dance Floor
- tip-888802 2 Kevin Bruce Harris: And They Walked Among People
- tip-888803 2 Vladimir Estragon / Three Quarks For Muster Mark
- tip-888804 2 Intergalactic Maiden Ballet Square Dance
- tip-888805 2 Mike Westbrook: Off Abbey Road
- tip-888806 2 Michael Gregory: The Way We Used to Do
- tip-888807 2 Kevin Bruce Harris: Folk Songs / Folk Tales
- tip-888808 2 Greetje Bijma: Tales of a Voice
- tip-888809 2 Wolfgang Schmid / Kick, B. Cobham No Filters
- tip-888810 2 Abdullah Lbrahim (Dollar Brand): Mantra Mode
- tip-888811 2 Mike Clark / Paul Jackson: The Funk Stops Here
- tip-888812 2 Abdullah Lbrahim (Dollar Brand): Water from an Ancient Well
- tip-888813 2 Blue Box Time We Sign
- tip-888814 2 Mitch Watkins: Strings With Wings
- tip-888815 2 Abdullah Lbrahim (Dollar Brand): No Fear No Die
- tip-888816 2 Abdullah Ibrahim (Dollar Brand): Knysna Blue
- tip-888817 2 Intergalactic Maidenballet Gulf
- tip-888818 2 Blue Box "10"
- tip-888819 2 Okay Temiz: Magnet Dance
- tip-888820 2 Abdullah Ibrahim: Yarona
- tip-888821 2 Subruto Roy Chowdhury Bageshree
- tip-888822 2 Raiz De Pedra With Egberto Gismonti Diario De Bordo
- tip-888823 2 Ferenc Snétberger The Budapest Concert
- tip-888824 2 Paradox Paradox
- tip-888825 2 Harald Haerter & Dewey Redman Mostly Live
- tip-888826 2 Abdullah Ibrahim: Cape Town Flowers
- tip-888827 2 Rikhy Ray: Mangalam
- tip-888831 2 Greenfish: Perfume Light, Singing Blue
- tip-888832 2 Abdullah Ibrahim: African Suite
- tip-888833 2 Paradox The Rist Second
- tip-888834 2 Ferenc Snétberger: Obsession
- tip-888835 2 Mahmoud Turkmani Nuqta
- tip-888836 2 Abdullah Ibrahim: Cape Town Revisited
- tip-888838 2 Lew Soloff: Rainbow Mountain
- tip-888839-2 Götz Atzmon & The Orient House Ensemble
- tip-888340-2 Abdullah Ibrahim: Ekapa Lodumo
- tip-888841-2 Gilad Athmon & Oriental House Ensemble: Nostalgico
- tip-888843-2 The World Quintet
- tip-888845-2 Abdullah Ibrahim: African Magic
- tip-888846-2 Nunu!: Con Alma
- tip-888848-2 Gilad Atzmon Musik
- tip-888849-2 Gilad Atzmon & Orient House Ensemble: Refuge
- tip-888850-2 Gilad Atzmon: In Loving Memory of America Rising Sun Collection
- rsc-0001 2 John Lee Hooker
- rsc-0002 2 Big Mama Thornton
- rsc-0003 2 Taj Mahal
- rsc-0004 2 Nina Simone
- rsc-0005 2 Archie Shepp
- rsc-0006 2 Louisiana Red
- rsc-0007 2 Esther Phillips
- rsc-0008 2 Johnny "Big Moose" Walker
- rsc-0009 2 Lightnin' Hopkins
- rsc-0010 2 Chet Baker
- rsc-0011 2 Louisiana Red A.o.yellowbird
- yeb-7707 2 Marc Ribot's Ceramic Dog Party Intellectuals
- yeb-7710 2 Susi Hyldgaard: It's Love We Need
- yeb-7711 2 Roy Nathanson: Sotto Voce /Subway Moon
