= Horacio Salgán =

Argentine musician (1916–2016)

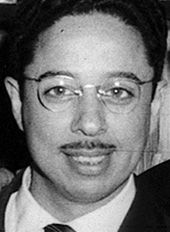
- Born: June 15, 1916; Buenos Aires, Argentina
- Died: August 19, 2016 (aged 100); Buenos Aires, Argentina
- Occupations: Pianist; composer; orchestra leader; arranger

Horacio Adolfo Salgán (June 15, 1916 – August 19, 2016) was an Argentine tango musician. He was born in Buenos Aires to an established Afro-Argentine family. Some of Salgán's most well-known compositions include Del 1 al 5 (Días de pago) (1944), A Don Agustín Bardi (1947), Entre tango y tango (1953), Grillito, La llamo silbando, Cortada de San Ignacio, A fuego lento, and Aquellos tangos camperos. He turned 100 in June 2016 and died two months later on August 19, 2016.

Salgán began studying piano at age six. At age 18 he joined the cast of Radio Belgrano as a soloist and back-up musician. At 20 he was discovered by orchestra leader Roberto Firpo, who hired Salgán for his orchestra. In late 1942 he made his first recording, and in 1944 put together his own orchestra, which lasted until 1947. Salgán then devoted himself to composing and teaching and in 1950 returned with a new orchestra. 1960 saw the formation of the Quinteto Real, with Salgán on piano, Enrique Mario Francini on violin and Pedro Laurenz on bandoneón. The goal of the group was to create instrumental tangos designed for listening rather than dancing. In 1998 he appeared as himself in the Oscar-nominated Best Foreign Language Film Tango, no me dejes nunca as part of El Nuevo Quinteto Real, an incarnation of the original group. In 2005 Konex Foundation from Argentina granted him the Diamond Konex Award, one of the most prestigious awards in Argentina, as the most important personality in the popular music of his country in the last decade.

== Video recordings ==
- "A Fuego Lento" on YouTube Played by Pasquale Stafano and Gianni Iorio
- "A Don Augustin Bardi" on YouTube Played by Horacio Salgán and Ubaldo de Lío
