= Transformation (Tal Wilkenfeld album) =

Studio album by Tal Wilkenfeld
- Released: 14 May 2007
- Recorded: 30–31 May 2006
- Studios: Right Track (New York City); Avatar (New York City)
- Genre: Jazz fusion
- Length: 48:22
- Label: Eagle
- Producer: Tal Wilkenfeld

Tal Wilkenfeld chronology
| Transformation (2007) | Love Remains (2019) |

Professional ratings
Review scores
| Source | Rating |
|---|---|
| All About Jazz | Favourable |

Transformation is the first studio album by bassist Tal Wilkenfeld, released independently on 14 May 2007. The album was recorded in May 2006, when she was 19 years old, having moved to the United States from her native Australia.

== Track listing ==
All music is composed by Tal Wilkenfeld.

| No. | Title | Length |
|---|---|---|
| 1. | "BC" | 6:20 |
| 2. | "Cosmic Joke" | 6:23 |
| 3. | "Truth Be Told" | 6:38 |
| 4. | "Serendipity" | 5:00 |
| 5. | "The River of Life" | 7:41 |
| 6. | "Oatmeal Bandage" | 7:51 |
| 7. | "Table for One" | 8:29 |
| Total length: | | 48:22 |

== Personnel ==
- Tal Wilkenfeld – bass, arrangement, producer
- Wayne Krantz – guitar
- Geoffrey Keezer – keyboard, piano
- Keith Carlock – drums
- Samuel Torres – percussion (track 3)
- Oteil Burbridge – bass melody (track 6)
- Seamus Blake - saxophone
- Malcolm Pollack – engineering
- Roy Hendrickson – engineering (overdubs)
- Bryan Pugh – engineering assistance
- Joe Ferla – mixing
- Bernie Grundman – mastering
