= Good Piranha / Bad Piranha =

Studio album by Wayne Krantz
- Released: 2014
- Genre: Jazz, Modern Jazz, Improvisation
- Length: 41:30
- Label: Abstract Logix

Wayne Krantz chronology
Howie 61 (2012)	Good Piranha / Bad Piranha (2014)

Professional ratings
Review scores
Source	Rating
The Guardian	4/5 stars
Irish Times	4/5 stars

Good Piranha / Bad Piranha is a modern jazz album by Wayne Krantz. The album consists of four songs played in two separate sets with two intertwined trios. Songs themselves are only being thematically utilized as vehicles for improvisation, containing only main themes from the original songs with everything else being completely improvised. Krantz elaborated on this in the liner notes of the album

"Did some cover nights a while ago at 55 Bar. Realized it didn’t matter what songs we play, we still do our thing. These songs are fine, but it could have been anything. Went into the studio for 2 days, cut loose. Still like playing guitar.”

== Track listing ==
1. "Black Swan" – 6:04
2. "My Skin Is My Sin" – 5:04
3. "Comprachicos" – 7:42
4. "U Can't Touch This" – 4:21
5. "Black Swan (Alternate)" – 6:56
6. "My Skin Is My Sin (Alternate Version)" – 3:47
7. "Comprachicos (Alternate Version)" – 2:43
8. "U Can't Touch This (Alternate Version)" – 4:53

== Personnel ==
- Wayne Krantz – guitar
- Nate Wood – bass guitar, drums
- Tim Lefebvre – bass guitar
- Keith Carlock – drums
- Gabriela Anders – vocals
