= Howie 61 =

Studio album by Wayne Krantz
- Released: 2012
- Genre: Modern Jazz
- Length: 54:35
- Label: Abstract Logix

Wayne Krantz chronology
Krantz Carlock Lefebvre (2009)	Howie 61 (2012)	Good Piranha / Bad Piranha (2014)

Professional ratings
Review scores
Source	Rating
All About Jazz	5/5 stars

Howie 61 is an album by Wayne Krantz released in 2012. It employs a large group of musicians and combines aspects of modern jazz harmony and rhythmic vocabulary with a compact, rock-like approach to structure.

== Track listing ==
All songs written by Wayne Krantz, except where noted.

1. "Howie 61" – 2:50
2. "The Bad Guys" – 2:32
3. "Check Yo Self" – 7:35 (Duke Bootee / O. Jackson / Grandmaster Melle Mel / Bobby Robinson)
4. "I'm Afraid That I'm Dead" – 2:58
5. "Son of a Scientist" – 4:32
6. "Can't Stand To Rock" – 3:38
7. "I'd Like to Thank My Body" – 2:32
8. "U Strip It" – 3:54
9. "BelLs" – 2:26
10. "How the West Was Left" – 6:07

== Personnel ==
- Wayne Krantz – electric guitar (1–3, 5–10), vocals (1, 2, 4–8, 10), piano (4), ring modulator (9)
- John Beasley – piano (2, 5, 6, 8, 10)
- Henry Hey – piano (1)
- David Binney – saxophone (8)
- Paul Stacey – slide guitar (10)
- John Patitucci – double bass (2, 8)
- Owen Biddle – bass guitar (1)
- James Genus – bass guitar (3)
- Pino Palladino – bass guitar (10)
- Tal Wilkenfeld – bass guitar (5, 6)
- Keith Carlock – drums (3)
- Vinnie Colaiuta – drums (5, 6)
- Charley Drayton – drums (2, 8)
- Anton Fig – drums (9)
- Jeremy Stacey – drums (10)
- Kenny Wollesen – drums (7)
- Nate Wood – drums (1)
- Yasushi Miura – sonics (4)
- Gabriela Anders – vocals (5, 7, 10)
