= Krantz Carlock Lefebvre =

Studio album by Wayne Krantz
- Released: 2009
- Genre: Jazz fusion, Modern Jazz
- Length: 54:35
- Label: Abstract Logix

Wayne Krantz chronology
Your Basic Live '06 (2007)	Krantz Carlock Lefebvre (2009)	Howie 61 (2012)

Professional ratings
Review scores
Source	Rating
All About Jazz	4/5 stars
AllMusic	3.5/5 stars
The Guardian	4/5 stars

Krantz Carlock Lefebvre is an album by Wayne Krantz released in 2009. "This trio's famously long residency at New York's 55 Bar used to be documented by downloadable recordings of the gigs the same night, and though the guitarist has access to a conventional recording studio here, he has kept the same improvisational live feel, augmenting it with some overdubbed theme statements and quirkily offhand vocals on four tracks. Krantz is accompanied by his regular partners, Tim Lefebvre (bass) and Keith Carlock (drums), and the bone-crunching three-way conversation they keep up joins the impact of a heavy rock power-trio to the harmonic sleight-of-hand and melodic slipperiness of a contemporary jazz band."

== Track listing ==
All songs written by Wayne Krantz

1. "It's No Fun Not to Like Pop" – 5:45
2. "War-Torn Johnny" – 5:38
3. "Rushdie" – 3:59
4. "Wine Is the Thread" – 5:48
5. "The Earth from Above" – 4:33
6. "Left It on the Playground" – 9:01
7. "Jeff Beck" – 4:17
8. "I Was Like" – 3:05
9. "Mosley" – 3:04
10. "Holy Joe" – 2:52
11. "Rugged Individual" – 6:33

== Personnel ==
- Wayne Krantz – guitar, vocals
- Tim Lefebvre – bass guitar
- Keith Carlock – drums
