= Nuevo Tango Ensamble =

Nuevo Tango Ensamble is an Italian tango-jazz trio which was founded in 1999. The members are Pasquale Stafano who plays piano, Gianni Iorio on bandoneón ( a type of accordion) and Pierluigi Balducci on bass.

The Nuevo Tango Ensamble has performed throughout Europe and often works with noted musicians such as Gabriele Mirabassi, Javier Girotto and Gustavo Toker.

In 2008 the trio appeared in the United Emirates as part of the Ástor Piazzolla music project.

== Discography ==
- 2002 - Astor's Mood (Realsound)
- 2005 - A night in Vienna for Ástor Piazzolla (Philology)
- 2008 - Tango Mediterraneo (Jazzhaus Records)
- 2011 - D'impulso'(Jazzhaus Records)
