= Roberto Fonseca =

Cuban jazz pianist

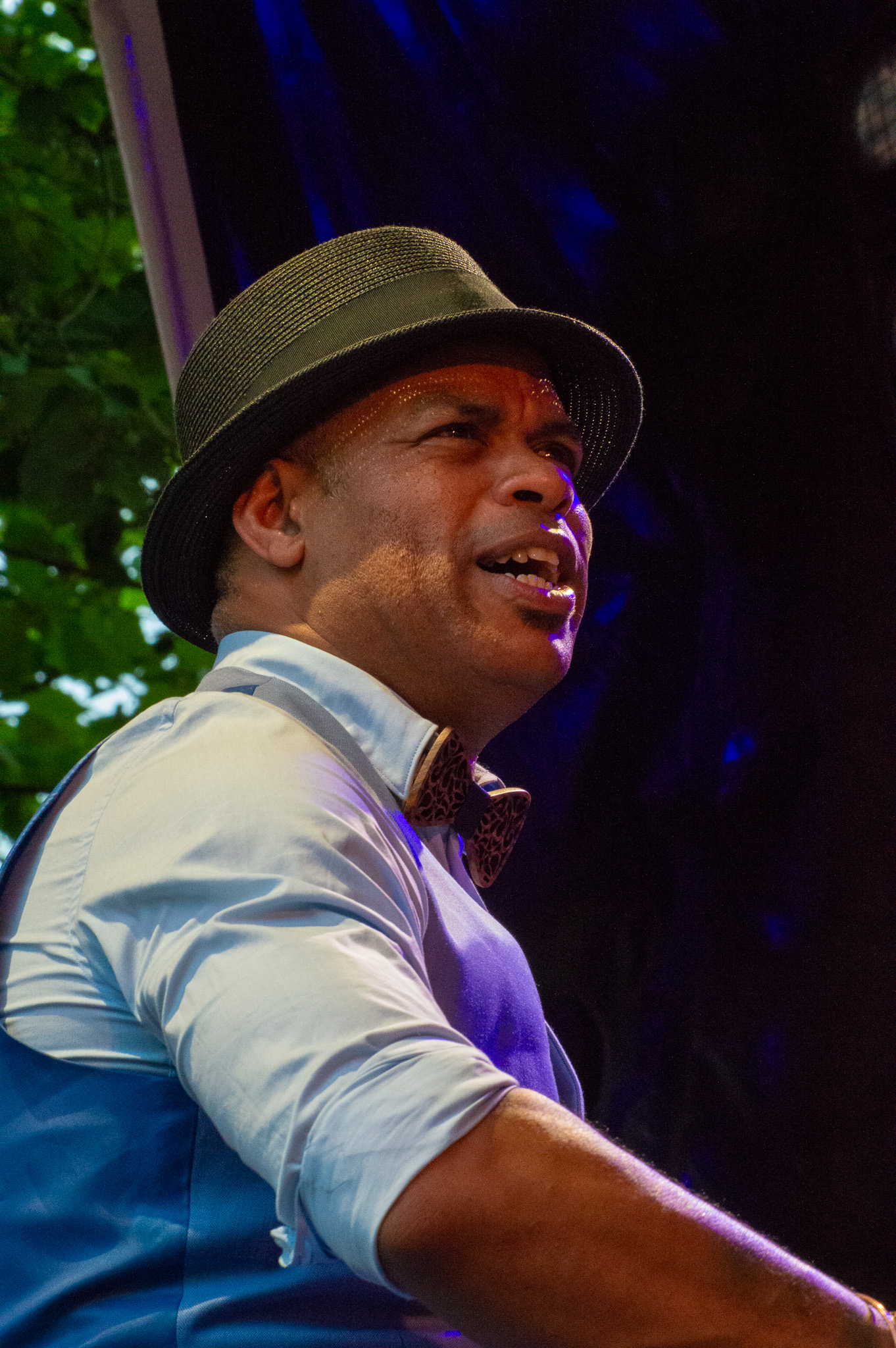
- Roberto Fonseca performing live in 2023

Background information
- Born: 29 March 1975 (age 51); Havana, Cuba
- Genres: Jazz, hip-hop, Latin jazz, drum and bass, urban music, Afro-Cuban music
- Occupations: Musician; singer
- Instruments: Piano; vocals
- Years active: 1999–present
- Labels: EGREM, JVC, Enja, Impulse!
- Website: www.robertofonseca.com

Roberto Fonseca (born 29 March 1975) is a Cuban jazz pianist. From an early age, Fonseca was surrounded by music: his father was drum player Roberto Fonseca, Sr, his mother, Mercedes Cortes Alfaro, a professional singer (she sings on her son's solo album, Zamazu), and his two older half-brothers from his mother's previous marriage to the pianist and musician Jesús "Chucho" Valdés are Emilio Valdés (drums) and Jesús "Chuchito" Valdés Jr. (piano).

== Biography ==
After an early interest in drums, Fonseca switched to piano at the age of 8, and by 14 was experimenting with fusing American jazz and traditional Cuban rhythms; he appeared at Havana's Jazz Plaza Festival in 1991 when he was 15.

Fonseca studied at Cuba's Instituto Superior de Arte, where he obtained a master's degree in composition, even though he often says that he was a really bad student. After earning his degree, he left Cuba to find his sound.

His first album, En El Comienzo, which he recorded with Javier Zalba and the group Temperamento, was awarded Cuba's Best Jazz Album in 1999. This success encouraged him to work on two solo records: Tiene Que Ver and Elengo, combining Latin jazz, drum and bass, hip-hop, urban music and Afro-Cuban rhythms.

In 2001, Fonseca went to Japan to record No Limit: Afro Cuban Jazz. He also toured with the Buena Vista Social Club the same year and has worked with Rubén González, Ibrahim Ferrer, Cachaito, Guajiro Mirabal and Manuel Galbán.

A Buena Vista Social Club tour spanned the world, with over 400 concerts, promoting Ibrahim Ferrer's records next to musicians such as Cachaíto López, Manuel Guajiro Mirabal and Manuel Galbán, among others, and playing at venues such as the Frankfurt Alte Oper, Palais des Congrès (Paris), Albert Hall (London), Beacon Theatre (New York), and the Sydney Opera House (Australia).

That period of intense work, touring round the world, led Fonseca to realise that his music was ready for creating his own project. He dug deep to compose each of the songs that form Zamazu, the result of the integration of all his influences: Afro-Cuban music, jazz, classical music and traditional Cuban music.

In the words of one reviewer, his recording, Zamazu, is "a deftly varied and well-sequenced set that leaves a strong impression of who Fonseca is and promises plenty for the future."

The track "Llego Cachaito" from the Zamazu album was used in the 2008 Will Smith film Hancock.

With his 2009 album, Akokan, Fonseca wanted to bring the magic, strength and improvisation from a live show to the studio. With a quartet formation and accompanied by his band, the one that he had been playing with for the past 12 years, Fonseca as the record's producer encouraged creativity and chemistry amongst the musicians. There are also two collaborations from artists that Fonseca admires, artists that have very different styles: Mayra Andrade, the Cape Verdean singer who wrote the words and sings on "Siete Potencias", and Raul Midón, the American guitarist, who wrote "Everyone Deserves A Second Chance". On this track Fonseca did the arrangements and Midon accompanied him on guitar.

In 2013, Fonseca's seventh studio album, Yo, was nominated for a Grammy Award. The album, which explored the African roots of Cuban music, features collaborations with African musicians such as Fatoumata Diawara.

For Fonseca's ninth studio album titled Yeshun, Fonseca drew inspiration from the names of two water deities from Yoruba-based religions. Yeshun, a name created by Fonseca himself, is a combination of Yemoja, the goddess of the seas, and Oshun, goddess of the rivers. Through the title of his album, which features collaborations from other Cuban artists such as Danay Suárez, Fonseca wanted to compare the vitality and fluidity of water to that of music.

In 2010 and 2016 Fonseca was the musical director for the support act for Omara Portuondo's USA tour. Fonseca's 2010 album Roberto Fonseca Live in Marciac includes a bonus DVD which features footage of the festival's 2009 show. Fonseca often visits and gives spontaneous performances at La Zorra Y el Cuervo Jazz Club in Havana.

== Discography ==
=== As leader ===
Year released	Title	Label	Personnel/Notes
1998	En el Comienzo	Egrem	Album by the group Temperamento, with Javier Zalba and Roberto Fonseca
1999	Tiene Que Ver	Egrem	
2001	Elengo	Egrem	
2001	No Limit	JVC	
2007	Zamazu	Enja	With Javier Zalba (saxes, flute, clarinet), Omar González (bass), Ramsés Rodrigues (drums), guests
2009	Akokan	Enja	With Javier Zalba (clarinet, flute, baritone sax), Omar Gonzalez (bass), Ramsés Rodriguez (bass), Joel Hierrezuelo (percussion), Mayra Andrade (vocals), Raul Midon (vocals, guitar)
2010	Live in Marciac	Enja	Includes DVD; in concert
2012	Yo	Jazz Village	
2015	At Home	Jazz Village	Duo album by Fatoumata Diawara and Roberto Fonseca (Live in Marciac)
2016	Abuc	Impulse!	
2019	Yesun	Mack Avenue	
2023	La Gran Diversion	Montuno	

=== As sideman ===
- Black P. Marabal Soundtrack (2000)
- Cuando Yo Sea Grande – Augusto Enriquez – 1998 (Egrem)
- Cachaíto – Orlando "Cachaito" López – 2001 (World Circuit Records)
- Felicidad – Asa Feeston – 2002 Inter Records Co Ltd
- Buenos Hermanos – Ibrahim Ferrer – 2003 (World Circuit Records)
- Buena Vista Social Club Presents Manuel Guajiro Mirabal – Manuel Guajiro Mirabal – 2004 (World Circuit Records)
- Flor de Amor – Omara Portuondo – 2004 (World Circuit Records)
- Angá Echumingua – Anga Díaz – 2005 (World Circuit Records)
- Javier Zalba – Javier Zalba – 2006 (Colibri)
- Timbalada – Carlinhos Brown – 2006 (Candyall Music)
- Mi sueño – Ibrahim Ferrer – 2007 (World Circuit Records)
- Absolument Latino song Zamazamazu – 2007
- Gracias – Omara Portuondo – 2008 (Montuno / Harmonia Mundi)
- Omara & Maria Bethânia – 2008 (Biscoito Fino)
- Etxea – Kepa Junkera – 2008 (Warner Music Spain)
- Gilles Peterson presents Havana Cultura New Cuban Sound – 2009 (Brownswood Recordings)
- Gilles Peterson presents Havana Cultura Remixed – 2010 (Brownswood Recordings)
