= Live at Ronnie Scott's (Jeff Beck album) =

2008 live album by Jeff Beck

Performing This Week: Live at Ronnie Scott's

Live album by Jeff Beck
- Released: November 10, 2008
- Recorded: November 2007
- Venue: Ronnie Scott's Jazz Club
- Label: Eagle

Performing This Week: Live at Ronnie Scott's is a live album recorded by Jeff Beck, also available on DVD, Blu-ray and streaming, recorded at Ronnie Scott's Jazz Club, in November, 2007 and released on 10 November 2008. Other performers were Jason Rebello on keyboards, Vinnie Colaiuta on drums and Tal Wilkenfeld on bass. The version of "A Day in the Life" featured on this album was awarded a Grammy for Best Instrumental Rock performance. The version of "Scatterbrain" also featured on this album was placed in the hardest setlist, "Fjord of Swords", of the music video game Guitar Hero 5.

== Track listing ==
No.	Title	Writer(s)	Length
1.	"Beck's Bolero"	Jimmy Page	3:29
2.	"Eternity's Breath"	John McLaughlin	1:14
3.	"Stratus"	Billy Cobham	4:47
4.	"Cause We've Ended as Lovers"	Stevie Wonder	5:17
5.	"Behind the Veil"	Tony Hymas	5:09
6.	"You Never Know"	Jan Hammer	3:20
7.	"Nadia"	Nitin Sawhney	3:41
8.	"Blast from the East"	Beck	4:40
9.	"Led Boots"	Max Middleton	4:23
10.	"Angel (Footsteps)"	Tony Hymas	5:41
11.	"Scatterbrain"	Beck, Middleton	4:32
12.	"Goodbye Pork Pie Hat/Brush with the Blues"	Charles Mingus / Hymas, Beck	6:14
13.	"Space Boogie"	Hymas, Simon Phillips	4:20
14.	"Big Block"	Beck, Terry Bozzio, Hymas	5:49
15.	"A Day in the Life"	John Lennon, Paul McCartney	4:46
16.	"Where Were You"	Beck	2:51

Additional tracks are:

- "Blanket" (feat. Imogen Heap)
- "Rollin and Tumblin" (feat. Imogen Heap)
- "People Get Ready" (feat. Joss Stone)

== Track listing (2015 deluxe edition) ==
CD1
No.	Title	Writer(s)	Length
1.	"Beck's Bolero"	Jimmy Page	3:29
2.	"Eternity's Breath"	John McLaughlin	1:14
3.	"Stratus"	Billy Cobham	4:47
4.	"Cause We've Ended as Lovers"	Stevie Wonder	5:17
5.	"Behind the Veil"	Tony Hymas	5:09
6.	"You Never Know"	Jan Hammer	3:20
7.	"Nadia"	Nitin Sawhney	3:41
8.	"Blast from the East"	Beck	4:40
9.	"Led Boots"	Max Middleton	4:23
10.	"Angel (Footsteps)"	Tony Hymas	5:41
11.	"Scatterbrain"	Beck, Middleton	4:32
12.	"Goodbye Pork Pie Hat/Brush with the Blues"	Charles Mingus / Hymas, Beck	6:14
13.	"Space Boogie"	Hymas, Simon Phillips	4:20
14.	"Big Block"	Beck, Terry Bozzio, Hymas	5:49
15.	"A Day in the Life"	John Lennon, Paul McCartney	4:46
16.	"Where Were You"	Beck	2:51

CD2
No.	Title	Writer(s)	Length
1.	"People Get Ready" (feat. Joss Stone)	Curtis Mayfield	5:08
2.	"Blanket" (feat. Imogen Heap)	Peter Akinrinlola, Imogen Heap	6:28
3.	"Little Brown Bird" (feat. Eric Clapton)		4:26
4.	"You Need Love" (feat. Eric Clapton)	Willie Dixon	4:21
5.	"Rollin’ and Tumblin’" (feat. Imogen Heap)	traditional	4:40
6.	"Race With the Devil" (feat. Big Town Playboys)		2:19
7.	"Crazy Legs" (feat. Big Town Playboys)		2:02
8.	"Train Kept A Rollin’" (feat. Big Town Playboys)		2:10
9.	"My Baby Left Me" (feat. Big Town Playboys)		2:35
10.	"Matchbox" (feat. Big Town Playboys)		2:26
11.	"Baby Blue" (feat. Big Town Playboys)		2:31
12.	"Honky Tonk" (feat. Big Town Playboys)		5:08

== Personnel ==
- Guitar – Jeff Beck
- Drums – Vinnie Colaiuta
- Keyboards – Jason Rebello
- Bass – Tal Wilkenfeld
