= 2 Drink Minimum =

Live album by Wayne Krantz
- Released: September 13, 1995
- Recorded: February–April 1995
- Venue: 55 Bar, New York City
- Genre: Jazz fusion
- Length: 52:28
- Label: Enja

Wayne Krantz chronology
Long to Be Loose (1993)	2 Drink Minimum (1995)	Separate Cages (1996)

2 Drink Minimum is an album by jazz guitarist Wayne Krantz.

== Reception ==
The Allmusic review by David R. Adler awarded the album 4.5 stars stating "Essential listening for fans of gritty, non-commercial fusion music.".

Professional ratings
Review scores
Source	Rating
Allmusic	4.5/5 stars

== Track listing ==
1. "Whippersnapper" – 6:47
2. "Dove Gloria" – 4:54
3. "Shirts Off" – 7:29
4. "Dream Called Love" – 9:20
5. "AFKAP" – 7:11
6. "Isabelle" – 8:17
7. "Alliance / Secrets" – 6:50
8. "Lynxpaw" – 1:40

== Personnel ==
- Wayne Krantz – guitar
- Lincoln Goines – bass guitar
- Zach Danziger – drums
