= Silencer (Nels Cline Trio album) =

Studio album by Nels Cline
- Released: 1992
- Recorded: December 20–21, 1990
- Studio: Sage & Sound, Hollywood, California
- Genre: Free jazz, jazz-rock
- Length: 68:43
- Label: Enja
- Producer: Alex Cline, Jeff Gauthier

Nels Cline chronology
Lady Speed Stick (1991)	Silencer (1992)	Beardism/WDTCHC (1992)

Silencer is an album by the American jazz group the Nels Cline Trio, released in 1992.

== Critical reception ==
The Los Angeles Times wrote that the "electric forays don't add up to another grab bag of tired fusion formulas... The pieces on the release stress shifting moods and textures more than virtuoso licks." The Omaha World-Herald concluded that the musicians "often gets into sound for sound's sake as the trio shifts from jazz to fusion to free interplay... The excesses nearly outweigh the good stuff."

== Track listing ==
1. "Las Vegas Tango" (Gil Evans) 7:25
2. "Mags" 7:34
3. "Rampling by the Sea" 4:57
4. "Sacred Love" 4:64
5. "Lucile's Trip" 6:34
6. "Broasted" 5:03
7. "Angels of the Harbour" 7:52
8. "Silencer" 3:31
9. "Lapsing" 14:24
  - "Part 1"
  - "Part 2"
10. "Exiled" 6:02

All compositions by Nels Cline except as indicated.

== Personnel ==
- Nels Cline – guitar
- Mark London Sims – bass guitar
- Michael Preussner – drums
