= Long to Be Loose =

Long To Be Loose

Studio album by Wayne Krantz
- Released: July 23, 1993
- Recorded: February 1993
- Genre: Jazz fusion
- Length: 61:04
- Label: Enja

Wayne Krantz chronology
Signals (1991)	Long To Be Loose (1993)	2 Drink Minimum (1995)

Professional ratings
Review scores
Source	Rating
Allmusic	link

Long to Be Loose is an album by jazz guitarist Wayne Krantz. It was the first album with Lincoln Goines on bass guitar and Zach Danziger at drums.

== Track listing ==
1. "These Instrumental Pieces Were" – 2:01
2. "Not Consciously Written About" – 6:47
3. "Specific People, Places, Things Or Ideas" – 6:38
4. "(Although One Began" – 7:01
5. "From A Little Croaking Sound" – 5:03
6. "A Friend's DAT Machine Makes)" – 6:35
7. "What They Were Written About" – 6:27
8. "Is Something I Don't Understand Yet" – 6:14
9. "But I Know It When I See It" – 6:37
10. "And Hopefully So Will You" – 7:41

== Personnel ==
- Wayne Krantz – guitar
- Lincoln Goines – bass guitar
- Zach Danziger – drums
