= Banyana – Children of Africa =

1976 studio album by Abdullah Ibrahim

Studio album by Abdullah Ibrahim
- Recorded: January 1976
- Genre: Jazz
- Label: Enja

Banyana – Children of Africa is a 1976 jazz album by Abdullah Ibrahim.

== Recording and music ==
The album was recorded in January 1976. It is predominantly a piano trio recording, with Abdullah Ibrahim on piano, Cecil McBee on bass, and Roy Brooks on drums. On "Ishmael", Ibrahim also plays soprano saxophone and sings.

== Release and reception ==
Professional ratings
Review scores
| Source | Rating |
|---|---|
| AllMusic | 4/5 stars |
| The Penguin Guide to Jazz | 3/4 stars |

The album was released by Enja Records. The AllMusic review by Scott Yanow concluded: "Some of the unpredictable music gets a bit intense (Ibrahim is in consistently adventurous form) but his flights always return to earth and have an air of optimism. An above average effort from a true individualist." The Penguin Guide to Jazz described it as: "A set of strongly coloured African themes, containing the germ of Ibrahim's 1980s work with Carlos Ward and Ekaya."

== Track listing ==
1. "Banyana – Children of Africa" – 2:00
2. "Asr" – 8:16
3. "Ishmael" – 15:02
4. "The Honey Bird" – 6:18
5. "The Dream" – 6:42
6. "Yukio Khalifa" – 10:23
7. "Ishmael" (alternative take) – 12:59

== Personnel ==
- Abdullah Ibrahim – piano, soprano saxophone, voice
- Cecil McBee – double bass
- Roy Brooks – drums
