= Akokan (album) =

Studio album by Roberto Fonseca
- Released: 2009
- Recorded: 2008
- Studio: EGREM studio, Havana
- Genre: Latin jazz
- Label: Enja Records

Akokan is the sixth studio album by Cuban jazz pianist Roberto Fonseca. It was released in 2009 by Enja Records. The album's title means "from the heart" in the Yoruba language. Recorded in 2008 in the EGREM studio in Havana, it is a tribute to Rubén González and Ibrahim Ferrer. The album was well received by critics.

== Background and production ==
"Akokan" is Yoruba for "from the heart". Recording took place in late 2008 at the Havana's EGREM studio.

== Overview ==
Like Zamazu, this album begins with a short ritual recitation by Fonseca's mother, Mercedes Cortes Alfaro. The pervading influence of South Africa's Abdullah Ibrahim is apparent on both "Lo Que Me Hace Vivir" and "La Flor Que No Cuidé," while "Cuando Uno Crece" is clearly dedicated to Rubén González. On "Lo Que Me Hace Vivir", Fonseca explores a "bass line exploration vamp that accompanies right-hand runs, defining his thoughts as he emerges from the dense clusters of notes." Fonseca dedicates the dreamy ballad "Como En Las Películas" (Like in the Movies) to the music of France, and claims that "Bulgarian" was inspired by that country. Even so, the combination of Fonseca's piano, the complex time signatures and Javier Zalba's eastern-inflected clarinet on this piece suggest Turkey's Ayşe Tüntüncü Trio. The contrarily titled "Lento Y Despacio" (Slow and slowly) is a stop-start percussive jam, similar in style to Aron Ottignon. The BBC considers the most striking piece to be "Drume Negrita", describing it as "a cool, relaxed vibe and features some lovely sax work by Zalba." Cape Verdean singer Mayra Andrade sings on "Siete Potencias" (Bu Kantu).

== Reception ==
BBC Music cites it as a "wide-ranging and accomplished album", similar to Zamazu, but slightly maturer and more subdued. Raul d'Gama Rose of All About Jazz said that his music on the album "reflects a singular voice, awash with deep emotions that emerge from childlike sentimentality to that of a questioning adult mind. Solos are deeply thoughtful, almost ponderous, with ideas that flow slowly from phrases that ascend like eternal questions, and then descend rich in possibility and the musical avenues he pursues with muscular technicality and textural elegance. He carries with him the tradition of Peruchin and Emiliano Santiago [sic], melded indelibly with the jazz idioms of the great Frank Emilio Flynn. Still, when he annunciates a phrase, idea or dazzling run, it is all Roberto Fonseca." Robin Denselow of The Guardian described Akokan as "[a] classy set, though he seems to be cramming in as many influences as he can."

== Track listing ==
No.	Title	Length
1.	"Fragmento De Misa See All 2"
2.	"Que Me Hace Vivir, Lo"
3.	"Drume Negrita"
4.	"Siete Potencias (Bu Kantu)"
5.	"Bulgarian"
6.	"Cuando Uno Crece"
7.	"Lento Y Despacio"
8.	"Como En Las Peliculas"
9.	"Pequenos Viajes"
10.	"Flor Que No Cuide, La"
11.	"Ritmo de Tus Hombros, El"
12.	"Everyone Deserves a Second Chance"
13.	"Cuando Una Madre Llama A Su Hijo"

== Personnel ==
- Piano and vocals: Roberto Fonseca
- Clarinet, flute, saxophone and baritone: Javier Zalba
- Bass: Omar Gonzalez
- Drums: Ramsés Rodriguez
- Percussion: Joel Hierrezuelo
- Vocals: Mayra Andrade
- Vocals and guitar: Raul Midon
