= Tim Lefebvre =

American bass guitarist (born 1968)

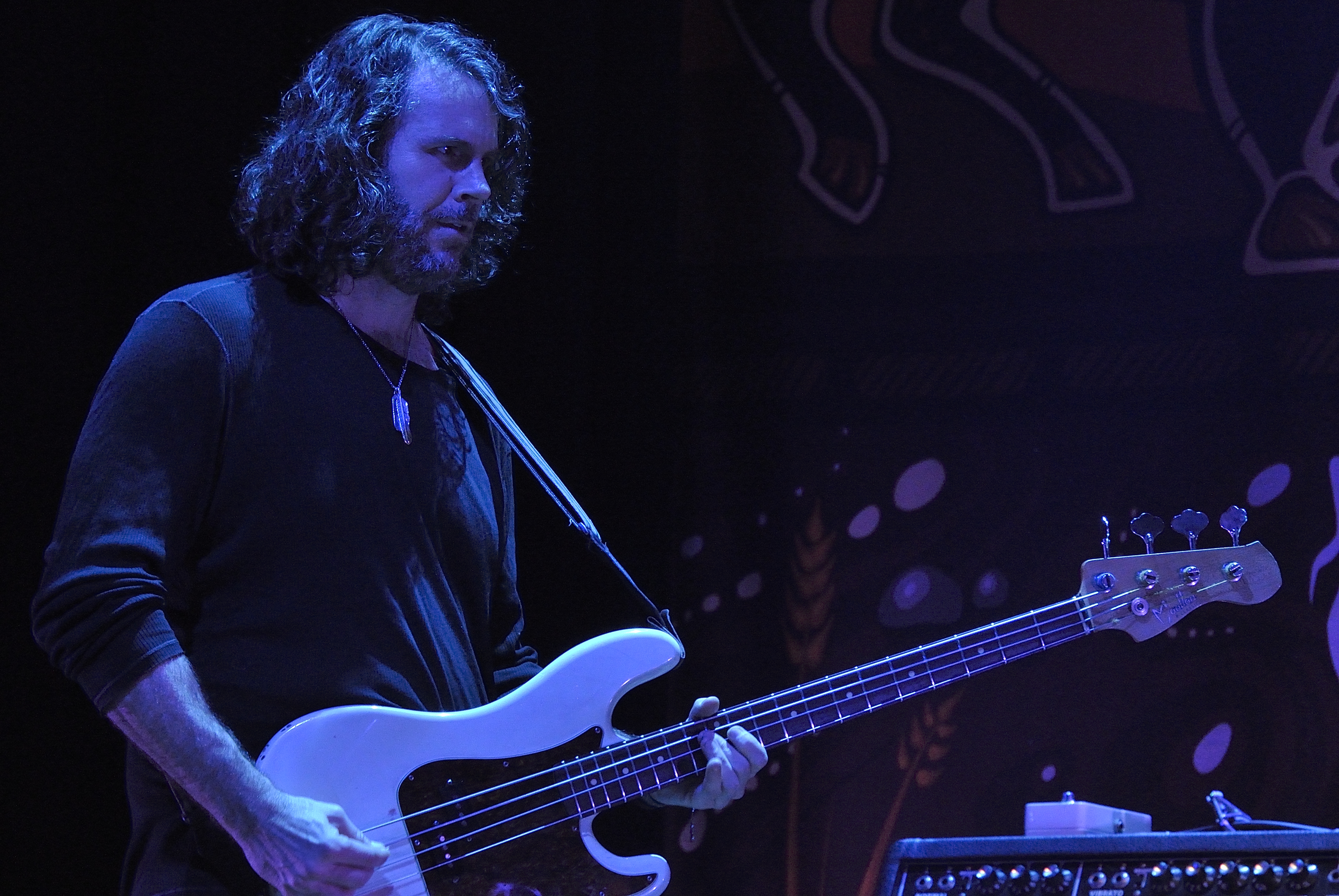
- Lefebvre with Tedeschi Trucks Band, Hitomi Kinen Kōdō, Tokyo, 2014

Background information
- Also known as: Tim Lafave; Skip Herbertson; Johnny Fever
- Born: February 4, 1968 (age 58); Foxboro, Massachusetts, U.S.
- Genres: Rock; jazz fusion; R&B
- Occupation: Musician
- Instruments: Bass guitar, double bass
- Website: www.timlefebvremusic.com

Tim Lefebvre (born February 4, 1968) is an American bass guitarist. Both as a session musician and band member, he has worked with a wide range of musicians, including David Bowie, The Black Crowes, Elvis Costello, Sting, Empire of the Sun, The Sleepy Jackson, Wayne Krantz, Patti Austin, John Mayer, Jovanotti, Chuck Loeb, Mark Guiliana, Jamie Cullum, Chris Botti, and Knower. A member of the Tedeschi Trucks Band until 2018, he also performed on film and television soundtracks, including Ocean's Twelve, The Departed, Analyze That, The Sopranos, and 30 Rock.

Called a "musical linguist" by Bass Musician magazine, Lefebvre is proficient in various genres, including rock, jazz, fusion, electronica, and R&B.

Lefebvre played bass on David Bowie's final studio album, Blackstar, which was released two days before Bowie's death in 2016.

== Equipment ==
Tim Lefebvre playing his Bacci Marleo Tim Lefebvre Signature bass at Officine Poma in Pescia, Tuscany, Italy.

Lefebvre's equipment as published in Bass Player:

Bass guitars

- Bacci Guitars Marleo Tim Lefebvre Signature
- Moollon P-Classic (with flatwounds and roundwounds)
- Moollon J-Classic 5-string
- Moollon fretless J-Classic
- CallowHill OBS5, "Lafave" Model, "Asshole" bass
- Fender Precision Bass ('63 and '68)
- Fender Jazz Bass ('65 and '77)
- Serek Midwestern Bass
- Guild/DeArmond Starfire
- Mathias Thoma acoustic bass with Gage Realist pickup and Pirastro Evah Pirazzi strings
- American Standard acoustic bass with Realist and D'Addario Zyex strings
- J5 Tim Lefebvre Signature
- LEH Offset 5

Rig

- Jad Freer Audio SISMA – Hybrid Tube/Class-G Bass Head _ VENERE series cabinet
- Ampeg SVT-VR head with SVT-810E cabinet
- Ampeg vintage B25-B head
- Aguilar Tone Hammer 500 head with SL 112 cabinet

Effects

- Jad Freer Audio CAPO, multiple preamp & dual D.I.
- Boss OC-2 Octave and RE-20 Space Echo
- Dunlop Way Huge Pork Loin Overdrive, Carbon Copy and Carbon Copy Bright Analog Delay, EchoPlex
- Custom 3 Leaf Audio pedalboard with Octabvre octave pedal and You're Doom fuzz pedal, Wonderlove Envelope Fliter
- Darkglass Microtubes Vintage and Microtubes B7K bass preamp
- Electro-Harmonix Frequency Analyzer
- TC Electronic Röttweiler Distortion
- Line 6 Tap Tremolo
- Pigtronix EP2 Envelope Phaser
- Mantic Vitriol, Density Hulk, Proverb
- Pedaltrain 18
- DOD Meatbox
- Daredevil Fuzz
- Pike Amplification Vulcan XXL

== Discography ==
=== As co-leader ===
- 1998 Blüth, Blüth (aka New York Jazz Guerilla)
- 1999 Boomish, Boomish
- 2000 Clearance Sale, Boomish
- 2004 The Play At Home Version, Boomish
- 2007 Rudder, Rudder
- 2009 Matorning, Rudder
- 2009 Krantz Carlock Lefebvre
- 2010 Domestic Blitz, Tim Lefebvre/Emily Zuzik
- 2016 Let Me Get By, Tedeschi Trucks Band
- 2016 Into The Cosmos Vol. I & II, 19 Foot Trio
- 2017 Live from the Fox Oakland, Tedeschi Trucks Band

(in Boomish he went under pseudonym Skip Herbertson)

=== As sideman ===
With David Bowie

- 2016 Blackstar
- 2017 No Plan
- 2018 Never Let Me Down 2018

With Till Brönner

- 1999 Love
- 2000 Chattin' with Chet
- 2010 At the End of the Day
- 2014 The Movie Album

With Uri Caine

- Bedrock 3 (2002)
- Shelf-Life (2005)
- Plastic Temptation (2009)

With Carmen Cuesta

- 1996 One Kiss
- 2004 Peace of Mind

With Bill Evans

- 1999 Touch
- 2001 Soul Insider

With Wayne Krantz

- Greenwich Mean (1999)
- Your Basic Live (2003)
- Your Basic Live '06 (2007)
- Good Piranha / Bad Piranha (2014)

With Chuck Loeb

- 1996 The Music Inside
- 1998 The Moon, the Stars, and the Setting
- 2001 In a Heartbeat
- 2007 The Love Song Collection

With Donny McCaslin

- 2010 Perpetual Motion
- 2012 Casting for Gravity
- 2015 Fast Future
- 2016 Beyond Now

With Chris Potter

- 2019 Circuits

With Andy Snitzer

- 2011 Traveler
- 2013 The Rhythm

With Knower

- 2012 Paying The Price Now
- 2012 Till The World Ends
- 2013 Get Lucky
- 2014 Lady Gaga
- 2015 Hanging On

With others

- 1997 Beautiful Love, Eddie Daniels
- 1997 Black Guitar, Leni Stern
- 1997 Spiral Staircase, Mark Sherman
- 1997 Turning Night into Day, Nelson Rangell
- 1998 I'll Never Get Over You, Chuck Jackson
- 1999 Parable, Pete McCann
- 2000 Fool No More, Peter Eldridge
- 2000 Jazzpunk, David Fiuczynski
- 2000 Loose Ends, Larry John McNally
- 2000 New York Night, Richard Dobson
- 2000 NYC d'N'B, Droid
- 2002 Balance, David Binney
- 2004 I Get Along With You Very Well, Tony Lakatos
- 2006 Strength, Gil Parris
- 2008 Moss, Moss
- 2010 30 Rock, Jeff Richmond
- 2010 The Pursuit, Jamie Cullum
- 2011 Mad Heaven, Peter Eldridge
- 2011 Time Together, Michael Franks
- 2012 It's Love, Eric Marienthal
- 2013 Sentimental Journey, Emmy Rossum
- 2016 Rich Man, Doyle Bramhall II
- 2016 Til They Bang on the Door, Lucy Woodward
- 2016 Two Vines, Empire of the Sun
- 2016 Angelenos, Emily Zuzik
- 2017 Cosmopolitain, Kamil Rustam
- 2019 HAN, Berhana
- 2019 Falling Awake, Paul Peress
- 2021 XXXX, Michael Wollny
- 2021 Lee Scratch Perry’s Guide to the Universe, New Age Doom
