= Tal Wilkenfeld =

Australian musician

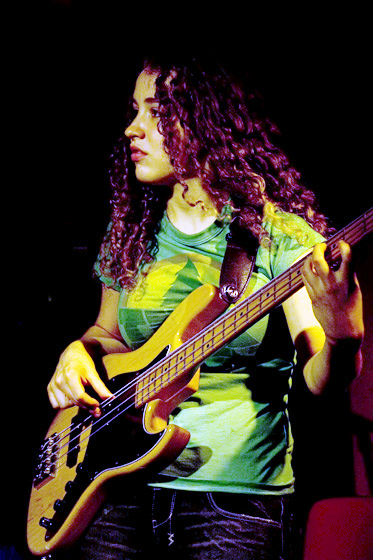
- Wilkenfeld performing in 2008

Background information
- Born: 2 December 1986 (age 39); Bondi, New South Wales, Australia
- Genres: Rock, blues rock, folk, indie rock, funk, jazz, jazz fusion, folk rock
- Occupations: Musician, songwriter, bandleader
- Instruments: Bass, vocals
- Years active: 2002–present
- Label: BMG
- Website: https://talwilkenfeld.net/

Tal Wilkenfeld (born 2 December 1986) is an Australian bassist, singer and songwriter. She has performed with artists including Chick Corea, Jeff Beck, Prince, Incubus, Eric Clapton, Herbie Hancock, Toto, and Mick Jagger. In 2008, Wilkenfeld was voted "The Year's Most Exciting New Player" in a Bass Player magazine readers' choice poll. In 2013, Wilkenfeld was awarded the Bass Player magazine's "Young Gun Award".

Wilkenfeld is a bandleader of her own bands in which she sings, plays bass, and plays guitar. In earlier work, she was backed by musicians such as Wayne Krantz and Vinnie Colaiuta. She opened for the Who on the North American leg of The Who Hits 50! tour in 2016. In 2016, she released a single entitled "Corner Painter" featuring Blake Mills and Benmont Tench. Also in 2016, Rolling Stone said that Wilkenfeld was "working on new music that sees her evolving from an instrumental prodigy into a formidable singer-songwriter." On 15 March 2019, Wilkenfeld released her vocal debut album Love Remains, which reached No. 1 on the Billboard Heatseeker charts on the first week of its release. Love Remains has been highly praised by the press and was featured in Rolling Stone, Relix, Paste, Billboard, and Forbes. Rolling Stone described her vocal debut as having "ten dense, riff-heavy tracks with brazen, introspective lyrics—prove her songwriting abilities." Wilkenfeld has also been a guest on popular podcasts, including WTF with Marc Maron, Lex Fridman and Bill Burr's Monday Morning Podcast.

Wilkenfeld has recorded on projects with Ringo Starr, Brian Wilson, Toto, Todd Rundgren, Macy Gray, Dr. John, Trevor Rabin, Jackson Browne, Joe Walsh, Rod Stewart, John Mayer, Sting, Lee Ritenour, Ben Harper, David Gilmour, Pharrell, Buddy Guy, Billy Gibbons, Wayne Shorter, Prince, Susan Tedeschi, Hans Zimmer and Carlos Santana.

== Early life ==
Born in Bondi, New South Wales to a Jewish family, Wilkenfeld began playing guitar in 2000 when she was 14 years old. Two years later, she dropped out of high school and emigrated to the United States, where she studied electric guitar. Within a year, Wilkenfeld switched to electric bass. In 2004, Wilkenfeld graduated from Los Angeles College of Music. She accepted an endorsement from Sadowsky Guitars, and devoted herself to forming a band and composing songs. At the age of 18, Wilkenfeld moved to New York City and began performing in New York's jazz clubs.

== Early career ==
While playing at a club in New York in 2006, Wilkenfeld met some members of the Allman Brothers Band. She credits Oteil Burbridge and Derek Trucks with encouraging her to join them at the Beacon Theatre, her first time on a large stage. The jam was about 40 minutes long; Wilkenfeld sent a recording of the performance to Jeff Beck when she auditioned for his band.

In 2006, months after performing as a guest with the Allman Brothers Band, Wilkenfeld recorded her debut album, Transformation, in only two days. Wilkenfeld composed, produced, arranged and played bass on seven songs with Wayne Krantz, Geoffrey Keezer, saxophonist Seamus Blake and Keith Carlock.

== Professional bass playing career ==
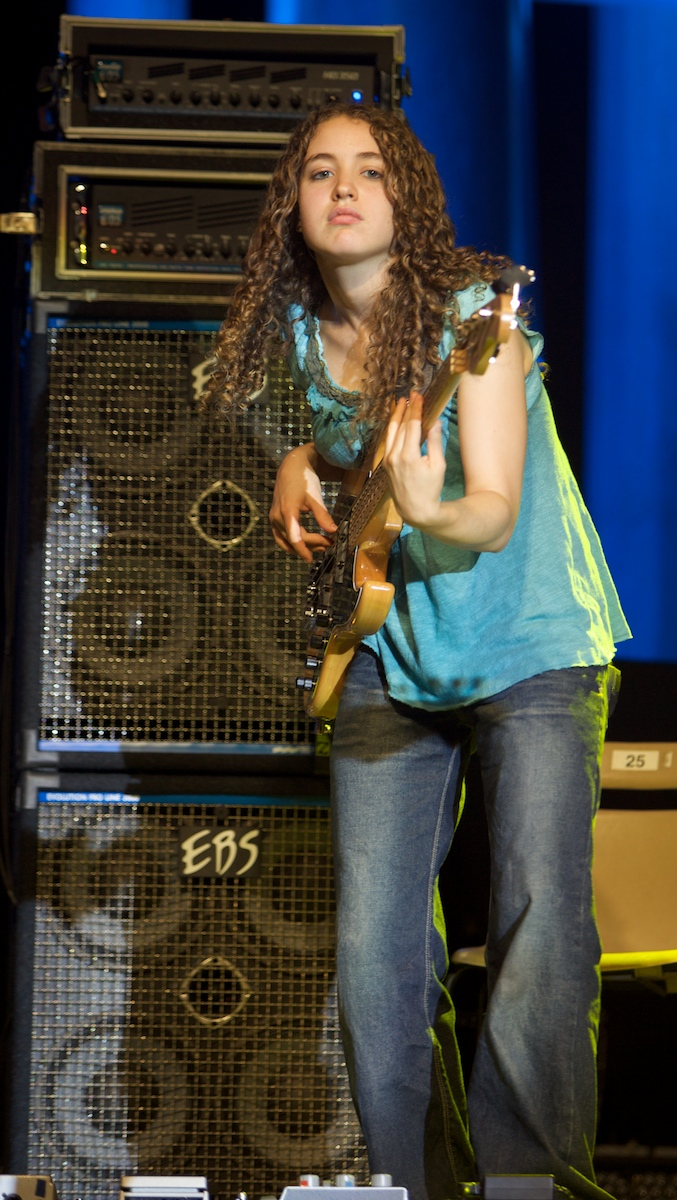
Wilkenfeld with Jeff Beck during his Jazz à Juan tour, July 2009

After learning that Chick Corea was seeking a bassist for an upcoming tour, Wilkenfeld sent him demos of Transformation, and was selected for his 2007 Australian tour, along with Frank Gambale and Antonio Sanchez. A few months later, she joined Jeff Beck, Vinnie Colaiuta, and Jason Rebello for Beck's summer European tour. The group completed a tour performing at Eric Clapton's 2007 Crossroads Guitar Festival in Chicago, performing to a sell-out crowd of approximately 40,000 people.

By November 2007, Wilkenfeld rejoined Beck and the other band members for a week-long residency at Ronnie Scott's Jazz Club in London. Beck selected the venue to record a new DVD and CD, with guests including Clapton, Joss Stone, and Imogen Heap. It was recorded, filmed, and released as Live at Ronnie Scott's. On the same trip, Wilkenfeld joined Herbie Hancock, Wayne Shorter, singer Corinne Bailey Rae, and drummer Colaiuta on a session filmed for the A&E series, Live from Abbey Road. Wilkenfeld completed 2007 with two standing-room-only Greenwich Village shows with Wayne Krantz.

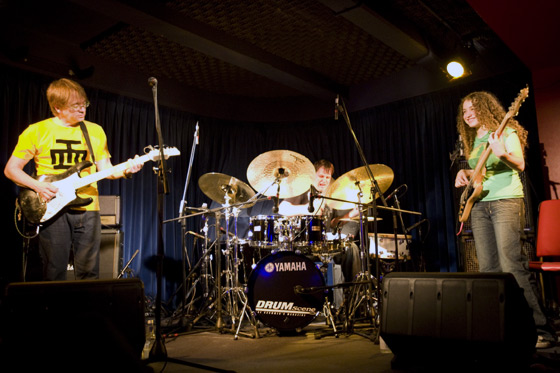
The Tal Wilkenfeld Trio November 2008 L to R: Krantz, Carlock, Wilkenfeld

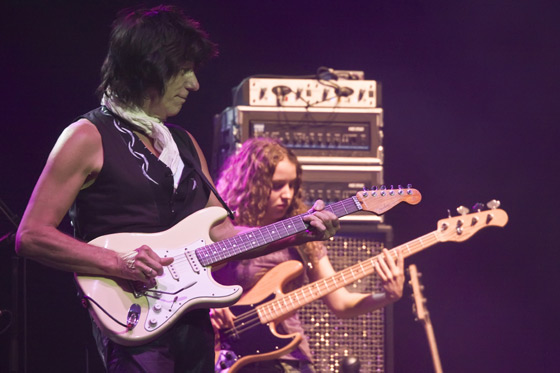
Beck with Wilkenfeld during her tour with Beck at the 2007 Crossroads Guitar Festival in Chicago

In 2008, Wilkenfeld accompanied Krantz at shows in Los Angeles, before an Australian tour with Krantz and Kevin Carlock, a reunion of the band which appeared on Transformation. At the end of the tour, Krantz, Carlock, and John Beasley backed Wilkenfeld during her headlining set for Bass Player LIVE! 2008 in Los Angeles. In July, she accompanied Jeff Beck in a tribute to George Martin in Los Angeles. She appeared at Warren Haynes's 20th Annual Christmas Jam while reuniting and performing with the Allman Brothers and guesting with Gov't Mule, Ivan Neville, and Robben Ford.

In 2008, Wilkenfeld received a phone call from Prince. She was surprised that his first words to her were, "Do you like the drum rolls of Jack DeJohnette?" Prince had Wilkenfeld attend parties at his Los Angeles home. Sometimes he and his band played and she was the only other person there.

Months later, Prince called Wilkenfeld from Minneapolis and said that he wanted to put together a trio with her; he asked Wilkenfeld to find a drummer for the act. Chris Coleman was selected; he had been playing with Chaka Khan and Rachelle Farrell. Prince flew Wilkenfeld and Coleman out to Paisley Park for the first time in late 2009. In March 2010, Wilkenfeld traveled to Paisley Park; she began to improvise and play chords on instruction from Prince. "I just made everything up; he gave me no direction about what to play beyond a chord here or there. It was just do your thing", Wilkenfeld explained. "I never heard the lyrics, never knew what the songs were about, never heard the melody. It was like we had to be psychic when we were playing", she added. The process culminated in Welcome 2 America - Prince's 2021 album and first posthumous release with previously unreleased music featuring Wilkenfeld on bass on 10 of the 12 tracks, recorded in 2010.

In 2009, Wilkenfeld toured Australia and Japan with Jeff Beck. Weeks later the group toured the United States, beginning with Beck's induction into the Rock and Roll Hall of Fame. They played Beck's Bolero there and were joined by Led Zeppelin's Jimmy Page on Immigrant Song. A DVD of this performance, Rock and Roll Hall of Fame: Legends, TV was released in 2010.

Between touring Japan and the US, Wilkenfeld performed with the Roots on Late Night with Jimmy Fallon as their first musical guest, after which she joined Jeff Beck's summer tour through Europe, Canada, and Britain. Pink Floyd's David Gilmour sat in with the group during a performance at the Royal Albert Hall.

In October 2009, Wilkenfeld reunited with Jeff Beck at Madison Square Garden for the Rock and Roll Hall of Fame's 25th Anniversary two-night concert. The set included Buddy Guy on "Let Me Love You Baby", Sting singing "People Get Ready", and Billy Gibbons on "Foxey Lady". The 25th Anniversary Rock and Roll Hall of Fame Concerts DVD, which also included "Big Block", "A Day in the Life", and "Freeway Jam", was released in 2010.

Wilkenfeld was featured on four tracks on Jeff Beck's album Emotion & Commotion. In 2010, she contributed to Hancock's The Imagine Project on "A Change is Gonna Come" and "Don't Give Up" She played on Macy Gray's The Sellout on "That Man", Lee Ritenour's Six String Theory on "68", "In your Dreams", "Give Me One Reason" and Guthrie Govan's song "Fives".

In 2010, Wilkenfeld appeared in the Baked Potato's 40th anniversary show at the Ford Amphitheater with Steve Lukather's band; she accompanied Hancock across the U.S., Canada, and Europe promoting a new release on which she had played. The tour included a show at Carnegie Hall to celebrate Hancock's 70th birthday. In September 2011, Wilkenfeld accompanied Steven Tyler and Jeff Beck at the iHeartRadio Music Festival at the MGM Grand Garden Arena.

On 19 May 2012, Wilkenfeld accompanied Beck and Mick Jagger on Saturday Night Live. In 2013, she joined alt-country singer-songwriter Ryan Adams as a collaborator on his studio album, Ryan Adams (2014). She contributed to two tracks on the Toto album Toto XIV, and co-wrote a song called "Running Whiskey" with ZZ Top guitarist Billy Gibbons. "Running Whiskey" was released in 2016 by Supersonic Blues Machine.

In 2018, Wilkenfeld performed with Bob Weir and his band Wolf Bros at the Arlington Theatre in Santa Barbara, California, and the Beacon Theatre in Manhattan. She was featured on the cover of Bass Player magazine's March 2019 issue. On 22 July 2019, Wilkenfeld appeared on Jimmy Kimmel Live!, performing "Killing Me" and "Corner Painter".

In 2022, Wilkenfeld recorded and performed "Oye Como Va" alongside Santana, Cory Henry and Becky G for "Playing for Change".

In January and February 2023, she played five shows with Incubus while their bassist Ben Kenney recovered from brain surgery. She also made two appearances at Bonnaroo alongside Cory Wong from Vulfpeck and JP Saxe. Scary Pockets released a single featuring Wilkenfeld singing "Big Yellow Taxi" alongside Larry Goldings. She also performed live at the Newport Jazz festival and Monterey Jazz festival with "Scary Goldings" featuring John Scofield.

In 2024, Wilkenfeld was interviewed by Lex Fridman on his podcast. Wilkenfeld sang and played the National Anthem on Kill Tony. At the end of the year, she produced, musical directed and performed on Jeff Ross’s comedy special on Netflix called Torching 2024 alongside John Stamos.

In September 2025, she made a guest appearance on The Jimmy Kimmel Show with Spinal Tap performing live on "Big Bottom", adding further bass alongside Derek Smalls (bass), Nigel Tufnel (bass), David St. Hubbins (bass) and Thundercat (bass).

== Solo career ==
On 3 March 2016, Wilkenfeld released a single, "Corner Painter", which featured Blake Mills and Benmont Tench. On 15 March 2017, Judd Apatow featured "Corner Painter" during a 12-episode season two of his Netflix series Love. She opened for the Who on the North American part of The Who Hits 50! tour, starting in Detroit on 27 February 2016. On her own she headlined between the Who dates, beginning in Toronto on 29 February 2016.

On 14 December 2018, Wilkenfeld released a song entitled "Under the Sun". In 2019, Billboard magazine premiered her new single "Killing Me". Wilkenfeld released her debut vocal album Love Remains on 15 March 2019. The album includes Mills on guitar, Tench on keyboard, and Jackson Browne as executive producer. Love Remains reached No. 1 on the Billboard Heatseeker charts during the first week of its release.

== Personal life ==
Wilkenfeld practices meditation. "I'm very focused on my spiritual, emotional, and mental growth" she told Rolling Stone. "I meditate every day, and I just want to continue to evolve as a person, and I hope that my music will reflect that." In a Popdust interview she added, "Meditating helps creativity flow. The more you meditate, the more you realize that everything is a meditation. The silence is important." Bass Player magazine asked about what it was like to work with Herbie Hancock and Wayne Shorter. She said, "It's comforting to know that two of the greatest musicians alive are just as focused on their spiritual paths as their musical paths, and for them, they're one and the same. I remember standing at the side of the stage a few minutes before I was going to play with Wayne, and he came up to me and said, "Play eternity!" Leonard Cohen, who I was lucky enough to spend time with, was also deeply focused on his spiritual journey. Self-inquiry is a very important part of my life, and it's reassuring to meet other like-minded people."

Wilkenfeld says that stand-up comedy is one of her favorite forms of entertainment. She has appeared on many comedians' podcasts including Marc Maron, Bill Burr, and twice on Jeff Ross's podcast, one time with Dave Attell. She co-wrote and produced a song for Maron called "New Boots" for a movie titled Sword of Trust. In 2023, Joe Rogan and Eric Weinstein discussed their friendships with Tal on the Joe Rogan experience, citing her as a "next level human being".

== Equipment ==
Wilkenfeld endorses Sadowsky electric basses and strings, EBS Professional Bass Equipment amplifiers, as well as cabinets, and effect pedals.

== Discography ==
=== Solo artist ===
Albums

- 2007 – Transformation
- 2019 – Love Remains

Singles

- 2016 – "Corner Painter"; Album: Transformation
- 2018 – "Under the Sun"; Album: Transformation
- 2019 – "Killing Me"; Album: Transformation

=== With Jeff Beck ===
- 2007 – Eric Clapton's Crossroads Guitar Festival, Wilkenfeld with Jeff Beck on "Cause We've Ended as Lovers" and "Big Block".
- 2008 – Live at Ronnie Scott's, Jeff Beck
- 2010 – Emotion & Commotion, Jeff Beck
- 2010 – The 25th Anniversary Rock & Roll Hall of Fame Concerts, featuring Wilkenfeld with Jeff Beck, Sting, Buddy Guy, and Billy Gibbons.
- 2010 – Rock and Roll Hall of Fame + Museum Live Legends DVD, featuring Wilkenfeld with Jeff Beck and Jimmy Page.
- 2013 – Eric Clapton's Crossroads Guitar Festival

=== With Herbie Hancock ===
- 2010 – The Imagine Project, Herbie Hancock CD
- 2013 – Experience Montreux, Herbie Hancock Blu-ray 3D

=== With Macy Gray ===
- 2010 – The Sellout, Macy Gray CD, Wilkenfeld performs on the track "That Man"

=== With Lee Ritenour ===
- 2010 – 6 String Theory, Lee Ritenour
- 2012 – Rhythm Sessions, Lee Ritenour

=== With Jackson Browne ===
- 2012 – Chimes of Freedom: The Songs of Bob Dylan Honoring 50 Years of Amnesty International, on "Love Minus Zero/No Limit", with Jackson Browne, Benmont Tench, Jonathan Wilson, and Jim Keltner
- 2014 – Standing in the Breach

=== With Trevor Rabin ===
- 2012 – Jacaranda, Trevor Rabin

=== With Wayne Krantz ===
- 2012 – Howie 61, Wayne Krantz

=== With Steve Lukather ===
- 2013 – Transition, Steve Lukather

=== With Ryan Adams ===
- 2014 – Ryan Adams, Ryan Adams

=== With Toto ===
- 2015 – Toto XIV, Toto

=== With Todd Rundgren ===
- 2015 – Global, Todd Rundgren

=== With Keith Urban ===
- 2016 – Ripcord, Keith Urban CD, on the track "Break on Me"

=== With Prince ===
- 2021 – Welcome 2 America, Prince CD – recorded in 2010

== DVD and Blu-ray ==
=== With Jeff Beck ===
- 2007 – Eric Clapton's Crossroads Guitar Festival DVD, Wilkenfeld with Jeff Beck on "Cause We've Ended as Lovers" and "Big Block".
- 2008 – Live at Ronnie Scott's, Jeff Beck DVD and Blu-ray
- 2010 – The 25th Anniversary Rock & Roll Hall of Fame Concerts DVD, featuring Wilkenfeld with Jeff Beck, Sting, Buddy Guy, and Billy Gibbons.
- 2010 – Rock and Roll Hall of Fame + Museum Live Legends DVD, featuring Wilkenfeld with Jeff Beck and Jimmy Page.
- 2013 – Eric Clapton's Crossroads Guitar Festival DVD and Blu-ray
- 2018 – Still on the Run (Jeff Beck DVD) Jeff Beck DVD
