= Signals (Wayne Krantz album) =

Studio album by Wayne Krantz
- Released: 1990
- Genre: Jazz fusion
- Length: 41:38
- Label: Enja

Wayne Krantz chronology
Signals (1990)	Long to Be Loose (1993)

Signals is a solo album by American guitarist Wayne Krantz, released in 1990.

== Reception ==
Professional ratings
Review scores
Source	Rating
AllMusic	3/5 stars
The Penguin Guide to Jazz	3/4 stars
The Virgin Encyclopedia of Jazz	3/5 stars

In a review for AllMusic, Alex Henderson noted that "Krantz's hardness and intensity serve him well" on the album, and wrote: "When Krantz lets loose and digs into such complex yet accessible jazz-rock as 'Faith in the Process,' 'Don't Tell Me' and 'Alliance,' the listener can focus on the depth of his playing."

The authors of The Penguin Guide to Jazz Recordings stated that the "starry cast" on the album "suggests a typical fusion slugging match, but the support team is used rather sparingly... and, though the pieces are rather short and curtailed, they're an entertaining bunch."

Jazz Journal's Mark Gilbert described the album as a "pallid set," and commented: "The record is dominated by Krantz's liquid-toned Stratocaster, which comes to us via a little echo and flanging and is used in the main to express bland diatonic ideas with little blues feeling or chromatic spice... the arrangement is cluttered and the dynamic all on one level."

== Track listing ==
All songs written by Wayne Krantz, except where noted

1. "Alliance" – 3:37
2. "Faith In Process" – 3:52
3. "One of Two" – 4:16
4. "Don't Tell Me" – 5:29
5. "As Is" – 3:30 (Leni Stern)
6. "Signals" – 5:35
7. "Sossity, You're a Woman" – 3:32 (Ian Anderson)
8. "Music Room" – 4:50
9. "Two of Two" – 3:17
10. "For Susan" – 3:40

== Personnel ==
- Wayne Krantz – guitar
- Leni Stern – guitar
- Jim Beard – keyboards
- Anthony Jackson – bass guitar
- Dennis Chambers – drums
- Don Alias – percussion
- Hiram Bullock - bass
