= State (album) =

Studio album by Todd Rundgren
- Released: April 9, 2013
- Genre: Rock; electronic
- Length: 51:46
- Label: Esoteric Antenna
- Producer: Todd Rundgren; Co De Kloet

Todd Rundgren chronology
(re)Production (2011)	State (2013)	Global (2015)

Professional ratings
Aggregate scores
Source	Rating
Metacritic	53/100
Review scores
Source	Rating
AllMusic	3.5/5 stars
Blurt	2/5 stars
PopMatters	4/10

State is the twenty-second studio album by American musician Todd Rundgren, released on April 9, 2013 by Esoteric Antenna. The album was written, performed and produced by Rundgren alone, with the exception of vocals by Rachel Haden on "Something from Nothing". Limited editions included a bonus second disc of a live performance at Paradiso, Amsterdam on November 11, 2012 by Rundgren and The Metropole Orchestra.

== Critical reception ==
State was met with "mixed or average" reviews from critics. At Metacritic, which assigns a weighted average rating out of 100 to reviews from mainstream publications, this release received an average score of 53 based on 9 reviews.

In a review for AllMusic, critic reviewer Stephen Thomas Erlewine wrote: "State never feels forced, either in its execution or concept. Rundgren is pushing the edges of his comfort zone just enough to keep himself stimulated while offering enough melody to satisfy those fans whose concentration usually drifts whenever he wanders." Lee Zimmermman of Blurt said: "Paying a revisit to several classic tracks, it offers ample reassurance that regardless of how he diverges, there’s always the comfort of those earlier endeavors."

== Track listing ==
All tracks are written by Todd Rundgren.

State track listing
No.	Title	Length
1.	"Imagination"	8:10
2.	"Serious"	4:13
3.	"In My Mouth"	4:16
4.	"Ping Me"	4:40
5.	"Angry Bird"	4:18
6.	"Smoke"	5:48
7.	"Collide-a-Scope"	5:19
8.	"Something from Nothing"	4:23
9.	"Party Liquor"	4:17
10.	"Sir Reality"	6:22
11.	"Hello-Light-Friends (Digital edition bonus track)"	8:39

Bonus disc – with the Metropole Orkest (Live at The Paradiso, Amsterdam)
No.	Title	Length
1.	"Another Life"	7:03
2.	"Hello, It's Me"	4:48
3.	"Pretending to Care"	4:51
4.	"Flamingo"	3:09
5.	"Frogs"	3:52
6.	"If I Have to Be Alone"	3:56
7.	"Love in Disguise"	4:08
8.	"Love Science"	5:35
9.	"Mammon"	4:47
10.	"Fascist Christ"	7:49
11.	"We Gotta Get You a Woman"	3:44
12.	"Bag Lady"	4:12
13.	"Can We Still Be Friends?"	4:20
14.	"Fade Away"	3:52

== Personnel ==
- Todd Rundgren - vocals and all instruments
- Rachel Haden - vocals
- Mathilde Santing - vocals

== Charts ==
Chart performance for State
Chart (2013)	Peak position
US Top Dance Albums (Billboard)	12
US Independent Albums (Billboard)	49
