= Gianni Iorio =

Italian musician (born 1972)

- Born: March 9, 1972 (age 53); Foggia, Italy
- Genres: Tango. Jazz, classical
- Occupations: Musician, composer
- Instruments: Bandoneón; Piano
- Years active: 1996–present
- Labels: Enja, Jazzhaus, Philology.

Gianni Iorio (born March 9, 1972), is an Italian bandoneón player who performs all over the world.

== Discography ==
- Astor's Mood (Realsound 2002)
- A night in Vienna for Astor Piazzolla "Live Album" (Philology 2005)
- Tango Mediterraneo (Jazzhaus Records 2008)
- D'impulso (Jazzhaus Records 2011)
- Nocturno (Enja Records 2016)
- Mediterranean Tales (Enja Records 2020)
