= Global (Todd Rundgren album) =

Studio album by Todd Rundgren
- Released: April 7, 2015
- Studio: Utopia (Kilauea)
- Genres: Rock; electronic
- Length: 48:27
- Label: Esoteric Antenna
- Producer: Todd Rundgren

Todd Rundgren chronology
State (2013)	Global (2015)	Runddans (2015)

Professional ratings
Aggregate scores
Source	Rating
Metacritic	57/100
Review scores
Source	Rating
AllMusic	3.5/5 stars

Global is the twenty-third studio album by American musician Todd Rundgren, released on April 7, 2015 by Esoteric Antenna.

== Track listing ==
All tracks are written by Todd Rundgren.

No.	Title	Length
1.	"Evrybody"	3:28
2.	"Flesh & Blood"	4:50
3.	"Rise"	3:44
4.	"Holyland"	4:04
5.	"Blind" (with Bobby Strickland)	4:38
6.	"Earth Mother" (with Rachel Haden, Janet Kirker, Michele Rundgren, Jill Sobule & Tal Wilkenfeld)	3:27
7.	"Global Nation"	3:44
8.	"Soothe"	4:23
9.	"Terra Firma"	4:25
10.	"Fate"	4:09
11.	"Skyscraper" (with Kasim Sulton)	4:06
12.	"This Island Earth"	4:01
13.	"Technopolis (Digital edition bonus track)"	4:37

== Personnel ==
- Todd Rundgren - all vocals and instruments, producer, cover art design
- Bobby Strickland - alto saxophone on "Blind"
