= Wayne Krantz =

American guitarist and composer

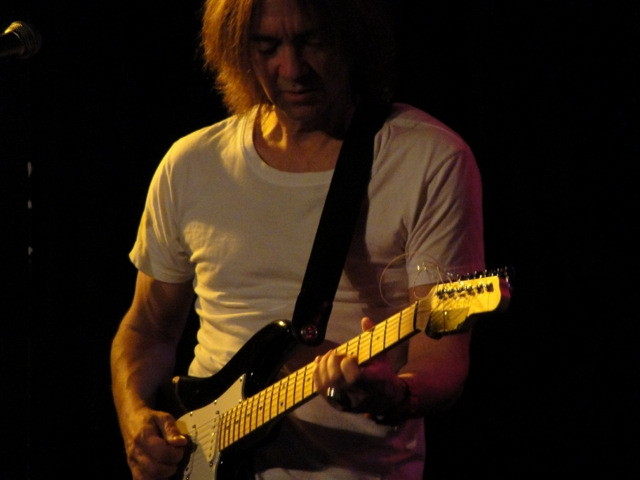
- Krantz in Chicago in 2012

Background information
- Born: 1957 (age 68–69); Corvallis, Oregon, U.S.
- Genres: Jazz rock
- Occupation: Musician · composer
- Instrument: Guitar
- Years active: 1980s–present
- Website: waynekrantz.com

Wayne Krantz is an American guitarist and composer. He has performed and recorded with Steely Dan, Michael Brecker, Donald Fagen, Billy Cobham, Chris Potter, David Binney, and Carla Bley. Since the early 1990s, Krantz has focused primarily on his solo career, mostly as the leader of various trio combinations.

== Career ==
A native of Corvallis, Oregon, Krantz began playing guitar at 14. Initially playing in local rock bands, he heard a jazz record in his father's album collection and became interested in the genre. Moving East after high school, his first international touring experience was with the Carla Bley Sextet. He released his debut solo album, Signals, in 1991. He formed a trio with Lincoln Goines and Zach Danziger and recorded an additional two albums with the Enja label, "Long To Be Loose" and "2 Drink Minimum." His next steady trio was with Tim Lefebvre and Keith Carlock, with whom he recorded three albums, "Greenwich Mean," "Your Basic Live" and "Krantz Carlock Lefebvre."

He has also worked with Billy Cobham, Michael Brecker, Chris Potter, Steely Dan and Donald Fagen.

Krantz worked with record label Abstract Logix to release Krantz Carlock Lefebvre in 2009. In 2012, Krantz released Howie 61 (a reference to Bob Dylan's Highway 61 Revisited), which includes John Patitucci, Charley Drayton, Tal Wilkenfeld, Vinnie Colaiuta, Anton Fig, Jeremy Stacey, Paul Stacey, Pino Palladino, Gabriela Anders, Kenny Wollesen, Nate Wood, Henry Hey, and Owen Biddle.

Krantz has written two books, "An Improvisor's OS," and with James Muller, "TABs On Krantz." He also created an app with Amit Lissack designed to increase tempo awareness, "Humanome."

== Discography ==
=== As leader ===
- Signals (Enja, 1990)
- Long to Be Loose (Enja, 1993)
- 2 Drink Minimum (Enja, 1995)
- Greenwich Mean (East River Joint, 1999)
- Your Basic Live (East River Joint, 2002)
- Your Basic Live '06 (East River Joint, 2006)
- Krantz Carlock Lefebvre (Abstract Logix, 2009)
- Howie 61 (Abstract Logix, 2012)
- Good Piranha / Bad Piranha (Abstract Logix, 2014)
- Write Out Your Head (East River Joint, 2020)
- Music Room 1985 (East River Joint, 2021)
- Player-Songwriter (East River Joint, 2025)

=== As sideman ===
With David Binney

- Balance (ACT, 2002)
- Aliso (Criss Cross, 2010)
- Graylen Epicenter (Mythology, 2011)
- Anacapa (Criss Cross, 2014)

With Leni Stern

- Secrets (Enja, 1989)
- Closer to the Light (Enja, 1990)
- Ten Songs (Lipstick, 1992)
- Separate Cages (Alchemy, 1996)

With others

- Robby Ameen, Days in the Life (Two and Four, 2009)
- Gabriela Anders, Cool Again (Evj! 2015)
- Jay Anderson, Next Exit (DMP, 1992)
- Fahir Atakoglu, Istanbul in Blue (Far & Here, 2007)
- Fahir Atakoglu, Faces & Places (Far & Here, 2009)
- Victor Bailey, Bottom's Up (Atlantic, 1989)
- Victor Bailey, Low Blow (ESC, 1999)
- Ranjit Barot, Bada Boom (EMI, 2010)
- John Escreet, The Age We Live in (Mythology, 2011)
- Donald Fagen, Morph the Cat (Reprise, 2006)
- Michael Formanek, Wide Open Spaces (Enja, 1990)
- Michael Formanek, Extended Animation (Enja, 1992)
- Gary Husband, Dirty & Beautiful Vol. 2 (Abstract Logix, 2012)
- Chris Potter, Underground (Universal/Emarcy, 2006)
- Markus Reuter, Mundo Nuevo (Unsung, 2015)
- Steps Ahead, Yin-Yang (NYC, 1992)
- Jasper van 't Hof, Blau (ACT, 1992)
- Jasper van 't Hof, Blue Corner (ACT, 1996)
