= Ernie Odoom =

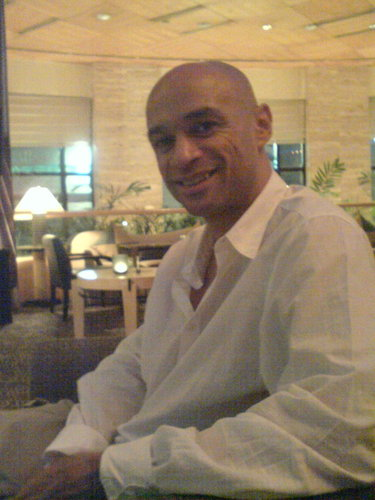
- Photo of Ernie in 2009

Background information
- Genres: Jazz, jazz fusion, jazz funk, improvisation
- Occupations: Bandleader, composer, saxophonist, vocalist
- Instruments: Saxophone, Vocals
- Website: www.ppa-plus.com/ernie

Ernie Odoom is a Swiss Vocalist, Saxophonist and Band Leader. He was a co-founder of PPA+ and Rootman which is Thai version of PPA+. Odoom released albums for the band LeBocal, as a vocalist and saxophonist, with his friends since 2002 and developing modern-improvising on his own style.

Odoom won the Prix du Festival at Crest Vocal Jazz competition in 2004 and went on to form the piano-voice duo E'MOW and the progressive pop quartet Liquid Groovement with pianist Michel Wintsch, who is a reference in improvised music in Switzerland. In 2008, Ernie began work with a new trio, The Glenn Ferris Wheel, with Glenn Ferris on trombone and Bruno Rousselet on double bass.

As a founder of Jaydo's Jazz Cafe in Geneva, he is playing jazz music in Geneva and usually appears on European/Asian jazz stages including AMR Jazz Festival (Swiss), Thailand Jazz Conference (Thailand), Saxophone Pub (Thailand), Eden Lounge (Vietnam), Pickwick Pub (Swiss) and Blakat Jam Session in Au Chat Noir (Swiss).

== Discography ==
Ernie Odoom began recording his full album in 1991. A list of albums featuring Ernie Odoom :

With Les Tontons Flingueurs

- Mama Told Me (1991)
- Voleur de Feu (1995)

With Peeping Tom

- Peeping Tom (1994)

With Sao

- Entre Ciel et Terre (1999)

With LeBocal

- Collectif etc (2002)
- Oh No !... Just Another Frank Zappa Memorial Barbecue ! (2003)
- Ego (2006)
- Bist du froh ? (2012)

With Pavel Pesta Re-Bop Quintet

- Pavel Pesta Re-Bop Quintet (2005)

With Glenn Ferris Wheel Trio

- ENJA (2009)

With William Parker

- Essence of Ellington (Centering, 2012)
- Wood Flute Songs (AUM Fidelity, 2013)

Recordings on his live performances :

- Just Kidding, Interrogation (1999)
- PPA+, Live at the Chat Noir (2002)
- Croon On (2003)
- L’Ilorkestra (2004)
- E’MOW (2006)

A list of CD albums that Ernie was invited to be a guest artist :

- Icare-SaturnSplit-32db (1997) - with Peeping Tom
- Lili Lazer (1998) - with Brico Jardin
- Liquid Sand (1999) - with Peeping Tom
- 16 Nouvelles Aventures (1999) - with Brico Jardin
- Neuf (2000) - with Sandro en Compagnie
- Delivering (2004) - with Actaruss 1
- Pavel Pesta Re-Bop Quintet (2005)
- Right Next Door (2006) - with Quartier Lointain
