= Taner Akyol =

Turkish musician

Taner Akyol (born 1977) is a Turkish saz or bağlama player and classical composer.

== Biography ==
Akyol was born in Bursa. He studied in Germany at the Brandenburgischen Colloquium für Neue Musik and the Hochschule für Musik "Hanns Eisler". In 2003 he founded the Taner Akyol Trio with Antonis Anissegos and David Kuckhermann.

== Recordings ==
=== As composer and performer ===
- 2001, Musica Vitale – one track by Akyol, as prize winner in 1998
- 2003, Traveller – Taner Akyol Trio
- 2006, Global Ear, 4 Modern Composers – Ganesh Anandan, Indian percussionist based in Canada. Jamilia Jazylbekova (born 1971), Kazakhstan. Tanyer Akyol, Turkey, Volker Blumenthaler (born 1951), Germany.
- 2007, Tanyer Akyol Birds Of Passage
- 2011, Maria Farantouri Sings Taner Akyol. Maria Farantouri sings in Greek translation poems of the persecution suffered by the Kurdish people.
- 2012, Ali Baba and the 40 Thieves: children's opera at the Komische Oper Berlin. Libretto by actor Çetin İpekkaya (born 1937).

=== As performer only ===
- 2002, Peri, project
- 2006, Claudio Puntin – performer (bağlama) Rot ist mein Name (Westdeutscher Rundfunk Cologne, 2005)
