= Quique Sinesi =

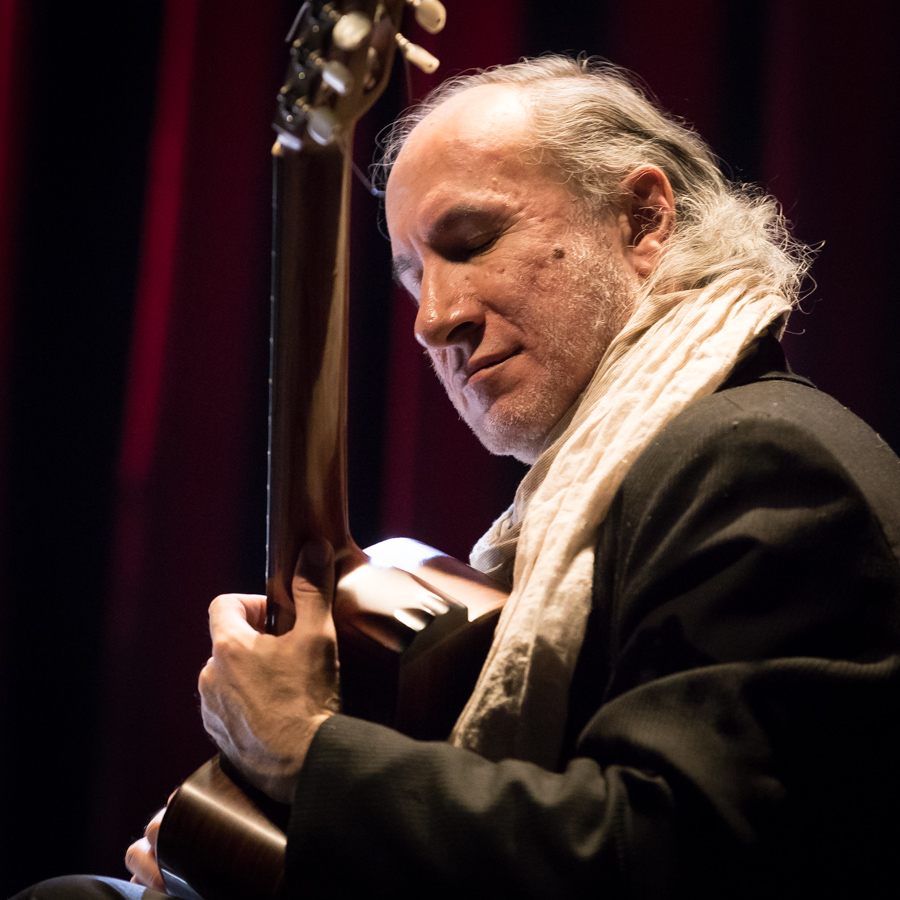
Quique Sinesi in concert in 2017

Quique Sinesi (born March 13, 1960) is a Latin Grammy Award-winning Argentinian guitarist. He has performed with artists such as Joe Lovano, Dino Saluzzi, Pablo Ziegler, Enrico Rava, and Charlie Mariano.
