= Pasquale Stafano =

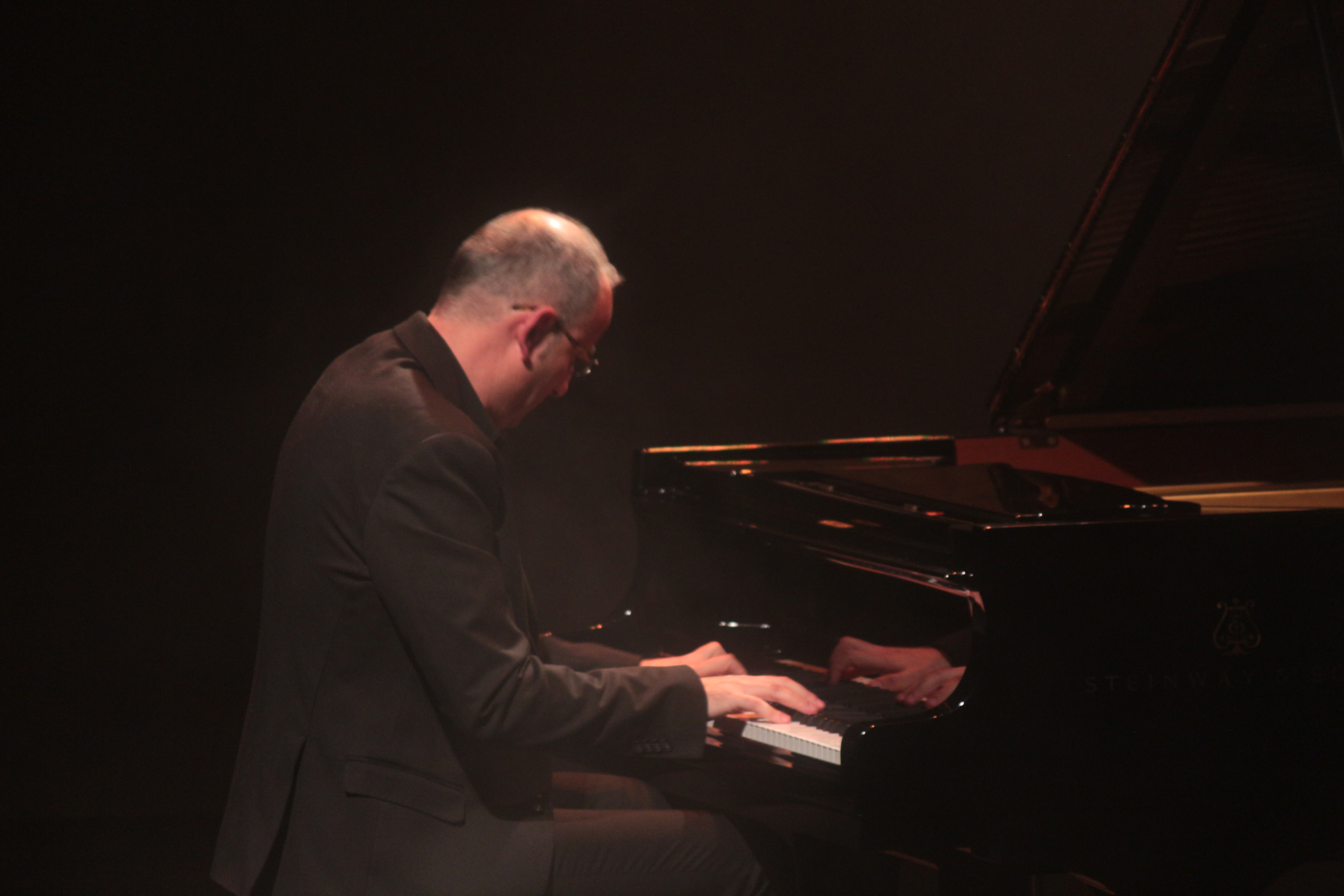

Background information
- Born: 2 December 1972 (age 53); Stornarella, Foggia, Italy
- Genres: Jazz, post-bop, fusion, jazz-funk, classical
- Occupations: Musician, composer, bandleader, arranger
- Instruments: Piano, electric piano, keyboards
- Years active: 1996–present
- Labels: Enja, Jazzhaus, Philology.
- Website: pasqualestafano.it

Pasquale Stafano (born 2 December 1972) is an Italian jazz pianist, composer and arranger who performs internationally.

== Biography ==
Stafano was born in Stornarella and studied at the Music Conservatory in Foggia where he took two degrees in classical piano and in jazz. He has also a degree in economics.

In 1999, he co-founded of the trio Nuevo Tango Ensamble. Stafano's seven albums include the 2021 Sparks recorded for Enja Records. His composition "Milonguita" was recorded by The 12 Cellists of the Berlin Philharmonic on their album Hora Cero released by Sony Classical in 2016. He composed with Jungbum Kim, and recorded with Nuevo Tango Ensamble, two compositions for the soundtrack of the Korean film Chronicle of a blood merchant by Ha Jung-woo.

Stafano teaches piano and jazz and has held workshops and masterclasses in Italy and internationally.

== Discography ==
- Astor's Mood (Realsound 2002)
- A night in Vienna for Astor Piazzolla "Live Album" (Philology 2005)
- Tango Mediterraneo (Jazzhaus Records 2008)
- D'impulso (Jazzhaus Records 2011)
- Nocturno (Enja Records 2016)
- Mediterranean Tales (Enja Records 2020)
- Sparks (Enja Records 2021)
