= Gabriela Anders =

Argentine singer and pianist

- Born: March 17, 1972 (age 54); Buenos Aires, Argentina
- Genres: Jazz, pop
- Occupation: Singer
- Instrument: Piano
- Years active: 1990s–present
- Labels: Warner Bros, Narada
- Website: Official

Gabriela Anders (born March 17, 1972) is an Argentine singer and pianist.

Anders started out on classical guitar, then studied piano at a conservatory in Buenos Aires. In the U.S., she was influenced by jazz and listened to the music of Stan Getz, Dexter Gordon, and John Coltrane. While she was in college, she sang with Tito Puente and Grover Washington Jr. Her first album, Fantasia was released in 1996. This was followed by Wanting released in 1998.
