= Keith Carlock =

American jazz drummer (born 1971)

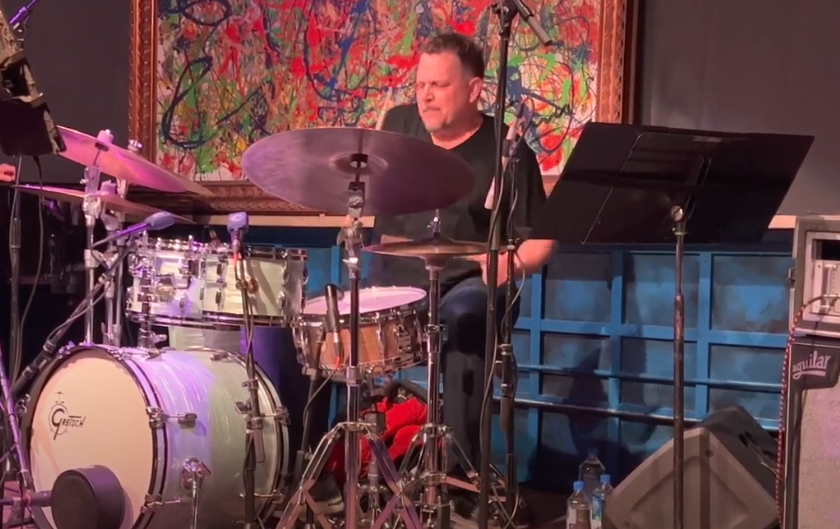
- Carlock in 2022

Background information
- Born: Bryan Keith Carlock; November 29, 1971 (age 54); Clinton, Mississippi, U.S.
- Genres: Rock; blues rock; jazz; jazz fusion
- Occupation: Musician
- Instruments: Drums; percussion
- Years active: 1990s–present
- Website: keithcarlock.com

Bryan Keith Carlock (born November 29, 1971) is an American drummer who is best known for playing with Toto, Wayne Krantz, Steely Dan, James Taylor, Donald Fagen, Walter Becker, Tal Wilkenfeld, John Mayer, Sting, Chris Botti, and Christopher Cross. In Modern Drummer's 2009 Readers Poll, he was voted best Pop, Fusion, and All-Around drummer. He is a member of the Mississippi Musicians Hall of Fame.

Carlock was born in Clinton, Mississippi, and attended The University of North Texas.

In October 2009, he released an instructional DVD called The Big Picture: Phrasing, Improvisation, Style, and Technique.

Carlock met and began playing with Steely Dan in the late 1990s, starring on their album Two Against Nature released in 2000 and then Everything Must Go released in 2003. Carlock has been touring with them since 2003, continuing to do so despite Walter Becker's death in 2017.

In January 2014, Carlock joined Toto, replacing longtime drummer Simon Phillips. He played on every track of the album Toto XIV and toured with them in April–May 2014. Carlock toured with Christopher Cross in 2023.

On May 5, 2026, Toto's touring drummer Shannon Forrest announced that he would be leaving Toto to focus on personal studio work. Shortly after his departure, Carlock rejoined Toto.

Carlock uses Gretsch drums, Evans Drumheads, Zildjian cymbals, and Vic Firth drumsticks.
