= Gevorg Dabaghyan =

Gevorg Dabaghyan Գևորգ Դաբաղյան
- Born: 12 February 1965 (age 61); Yerevan, Armenian SSR, Soviet Union
- Genres: Folk; Liturgical
- Occupation: Musician
- Instrument: Duduk

Gevorg Gourgeni Dabaghyan (Note: Armenian: Գևորգ Գուրգենի Դաբաղյան, romanized: Gevorg Gurgeni Dabaghyan) (born 12 February 1965) is an Armenian duduk player of liturgical and folk music, born in Yerevan. In 1991 he founded the Shoghaken Folk Ensemble, a group of Armenian folk musicians and singers who specialize in traditional Armenian music.

He was part of Yo-Yo Ma's Silk Road Project in 2005 and appears on the Silk Road Journeys: Beyond the Horizon, a 2005 album by Yo-Yo Ma and the Silk Road Ensemble.

== Discography ==
Solo recordings

- [1996] Music of Armenia.Vol.3: Duduk(Celestial Harmonies)
- [2002] Miniatures(Traditional Crossroads)

With Shoghaken Folk Ensemble

- [1996] The Music of Armenia, Vol. 5: Folk Music(Celestial Harmonies)
- [2002] Armenia Anthology(Traditional Crossroads)
- [2004] Traditional Dances Of Armenia(Traditional Crossroads)
- [2005] Hasmik Harutyunyan with The Shoghaken Ensemble - Armenian Lullabies
- [2007] Shoghaken Ensemble - Music from Armenia(Traditional Crossroads)

With Komitas Quartet

- [2005]Vache Sharafyan-On The Fortieth Day(Traditional Crossroads)
- [2008]Lost Songs from Eden(Traditional Crossroads)

With Rabih Abou-Khalil

- [2007]Songs for Sad Women (Enja)

With Mannik Grigorian

- [1996]Mannik Grigorian – Van: Armenian Folk Songs(MEG Recordings)
