= Samo Šalamon =

Slovenian jazz guitarist and composer (born 1978)

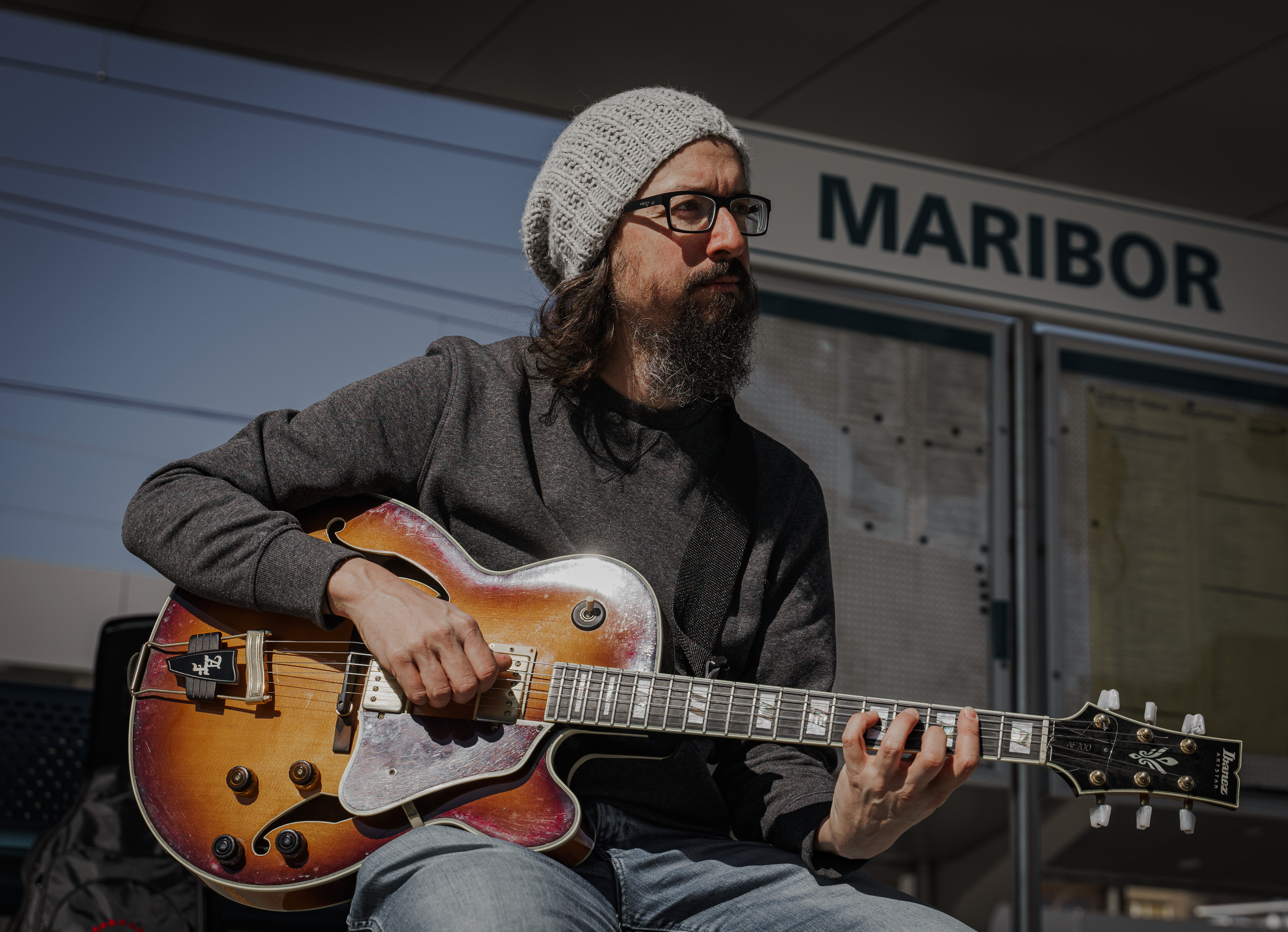
- Samo Šalamon in Maribor, March 2021

Background information
- Born: 9 October 1978 (age 46); Maribor, Slovenia
- Genres: Jazz
- Occupations: Composer; guitarist
- Instrument: Guitar
- Years active: 1990s–present
- Labels: Samo Records, Clean Feed, Fresh Sound New Talent, SteepleChase, Splasc(h)
- Website: www.samosalamon.com

Samo Šalamon (born 9 October 1978 in Maribor, Slovenia) is a Slovenian jazz composer, guitarist and interviewer. He has performed on over 35 albums and is credited with over 300 compositions.

== Biography ==
Šalamon started playing guitar at the age of seven, studying classical guitar in Maribor until the age of fifteen. He later studied at the University of Ljubljana, earning a PhD in American poetry and translation. During his time at the university, he developed an interest in jazz and improvisation.

In 1999, Šalamon met jazz guitarist John Scofield, who became a collaborator and influence on his musical development. In the early 2000s, Šalamon began performing and recording with musicians from the New York jazz scene, including Tim Berne, David Binney, Josh Roseman, Tony Malaby, Mark Helias, Tom Rainey, Gerald Cleaver, Tyshawn Sorey, John Hebert, Donny McCaslin, and others. In 2003, he recorded Ornethology, his debut album, featuring a European quartet with Achille Succi, Salvatore Maiore, and Zlatko Kaučič. With this group, he performed at the Ljubljana Jazz Festival, Roma Jazz Festival, and Skopje Jazz Festival. The album Ornethology was included in The Penguin Guide to Jazz list of the 1001 Best Albums in the History of Jazz.

Šalamon performed extensively across Europe, collaborating with both European and American jazz musicians, including French tubist Michel Godard, American reed player Paul McCandless, saxophonists Achille Succi and Tony Malaby, drummer Roberto Dani, and pianist Stefano Battaglia. His work has incorporated elements of modern composition and improvisation. His projects have included duos with guitarist Hasse Poulsen and clarinetist Francois Houle, and a European sextet on the album The Colours Suite, featuring Julian Arguelles, Achille Succi, Roberto Dani, Pascal Niggenkemper, and Christian Lillinger. He also led a large improvisational orchestra with members such as Fredrik Ljungkvist, Luis Vicente, Albert Cirera, and Martin Küchen.

Šalamon has recorded for European jazz labels such as Clean Feed Records, Fresh Sound New Talent, Not Two Records, SteepleChase Records, and Splasc(h) Records. As a composer, he developed projects synthesizing contemporary jazz, classical music, and free improvisation.

In 2022, Šalamon recorded the album Dolphyology, a collection of Eric Dolphy's music played on solo acoustic guitar. The album features 28 compositions by Eric Dolphy, rearranged for acoustic guitar, ranging from avant-garde to lyrical. In June 2022, Šalamon released Pure and Simple, a collaborative trio album featuring Norwegian bassist Arild Andersen and American drummer Ra-Kalam Bob Moses. The album was followed by a European tour in October 2022.

== Style ==
Šalamon's guitar style is influenced by his studies of jazz saxophonists Ornette Coleman and Eric Dolphy, evident in his first two albums, Ornethology and Ela's Dream. His early guitar playing was influenced by guitarist John Scofield and musicians like John Abercrombie, Ben Monder, Adam Rogers, and Bill Frisell. His compositional style draws from different areas of jazz and modern classical composers such as Béla Bartók, Witold Lutosławski, and Olivier Messiaen.

== Discography ==
Release year	Album	Label	Personnel
2003	Ornethology	Samo Records	Achille Succi, Salvatore Maiore, Zlatko Kaučič
2005	Ela's Dream	Splasc(h) Records	Achille Succi, David Binney, Kyle Gregory, Paolino Dalla Porta, Zlatko Kaučič
2005	Two Hours	Fresh Sound New Talent	Tony Malaby, Mark Helias, Tom Rainey
2006	Kei's Secret	Splasc(h) Records	Achille Succi, Carlo DeRosa, Tyshawn Sorey
2006	Government Cheese	Fresh Sound New Talent	David Binney, Josh Roseman, Mark Helias, Gerald Cleaver
2007	Nano	Goga Records	Julian Argüelles, Michel Godard, Roberto Dani
2007	Fall Memories	Splasc(h) Records	Luciano Biondini, Michel Godard, Roberto Dani
2008	Mamasaal feat. Mark Turner	Dometra Records	Mark Turner, Matt Brewer, Aljoša Jerič
2009	Live!	Samo Records	Michel Godard, Roberto Dani
2011	Almost Almond	Sanje Records	Drew Gress, Tom Rainey
2011	Duality	Samo Records	Tim Berne, Achille Succi, Tom Rainey, Roberto Dani
2012	Eleven Stories	Samo Records	Michel Godard, Roberto Dani
2013	Stretching Out	Samo Records	Donny McCaslin, Dominique Pifarély, Bruno Chevillon, John Hebert, Gerald Cleaver, Roberto Dani
2014	Orchestrology	KGOSF Records	Roberto Dani, Slovene Philharmonic String Chamber Orchestra
2014	2 Alto	SteepleChase Records	Loren Stillman, John O'Gallagher, Roberto Dani
2014	Ives	Samo Records	Manu Codjia, Mikkel Ploug
2015	Little River	Samo Records	Paul McCandless, Roberto Dani
2016	Unity	Samo Records	Julian Argüelles, John Hollenbeck
2016	windS	Klopotec Records	Stefano Battaglia
2017	The Colours Suite	Clean Feed Records	Julian Argüelles, Achille Succi, Pascal Niggenkemper, Christian Lillinger, Roberto Dani
2017	Free Sessions Vol. 1: Planets of Kei	Not Two Records	Achille Succi, Szilard Mezei
2018	Traveling Moving Breathing	Clean Feed Records	Tony Malaby, Roberto Dani
2018	Peaks of Light	Samo Records	Howard Levy
2018	Pure Magic	Alessa Records	Stefano Battaglia
2019	Free Sessions Vol. 2: Freequestra	Klopotec Records	Matija Krecic, Bostjan Simon, Achille Succi, Ziga Murko, Domen Gnezda, Vitja Balzalorsky, Marko Crncec, Goran Krmac, Bojan Krhlanko, Jaka Berger
2019	Swirling Blind Unstilled	Klopotec Records	Szilard Mezei, Jaka Berger
2019	Punk You	Samo Records	Eva Poženel, Achille Succi, Bojan Krhlanko
2020	Rare Ebb	Samo Records	Igor Matković, Kristijan Krajnčan
2020	Common Flow	Samo Records	Igor Matković, Kristijan Krajnčan
2020	Almost Alone Vol. 1	Samo Records	Alex Machacek, Rafal Sarnecki, Cenk Erdogan, Andre Fernandes, Kalle Kalima, Jacob Young, Albert Vila, Dušan Jevtović, Lorenzo Di Maio, Philipp Schaufelberger, Spiros Exaras
2020	Free Distance, Vol. 1: Love is More Thicker	Samo Records	Emanuele Marsico, Alberto Mandarini, Mirko Cisilino, Luís Vicente, Emanuele Parrini, Marco Colonna, Achille Succi, Albert Cirera, Fredrik Ljungkvist, Christoph Irniger, Alberto Pinton, Beppe Scardino, Martin Küchen, Marcelo Dos Reis, Silvia Bolognesi, Vasco Trilla
2021	Timelessness	Samo Records	Cene Resnik, Bojan Krhlanko
2021	String Dancers	Samo Records	Hasse Poulsen
2021	Unobservable Mysteries	Afterday Records	Francois Houle
2022	Joy and Sorrow	Klopotec Records	Sabir Mateen
2022	Free Distance, Vol. 2: Poems are Opening	Fundacja Sluchaj	Emanuele Marsico, Alberto Mandarini, Mirko Cisilino, Luís Vicente, Emanuele Parrini, Marco Colonna, Achille Succi, Albert Cirera, Fredrik Ljungkvist, Christoph Irniger, Alberto Pinton, Beppe Scardino, Martin Küchen, Marcelo Dos Reis, Silvia Bolognesi, Vasco Trilla
2022	Dolphyology	Samo Records	(solo album)
2022	Pure and Simple	Samo Records	Arild Andersen, Ra-Kalam Bob Moses
2022	Before It Rains	Samo Records	Cene Resnik, Jost Drasler, Bojan Krhlanko
2023	Rainbow Bubbles	Samo Records	Asaf Sirkis
2023	Eating Poetry	Clean Feed Records	Emanuele Parrini, Vasco Trilla
2023	Electric Duo	Samo Records	Martin Speake
2023	State of Grace	Samo Records	Bruce Saunders
2024	Dances of Freedom	Samo Records	Vasil Hadžimanov, Ra-Kalam Bob Moses
2024	Unlocking the Code	Samo Records	Kevin Miller
2024	For the Listener Who Listens	Samo Records	Ronan Guilfoyle, Rafal Mazur
2024	The Thinkers	Samo Records	Cene Resnik, Samuel Ber
2025	Acoustic Duo	Samo Records	Martin Speake
2025	Dream Suites Vol. 1	Samo Records	Dave Ballou, Russ Johnson, Tom Varner, Jeb Bishop, Curtis Hasselbring, Steve Swell, Chet Doxas, Ben Goldberg, Vinny Golia, Adam Kolker, Andrew Rathbun, Ned Rothenberg, Dan Willis, Ernst Reijseger, Rez Abbasi, Mike Baggetta, Jonathan Goldberger, Jerome Harris, Michael Cain, Steve Hunt, Jimmy Haslip, Chris Lightcap, Eivind Opsvik, Matt Pavolka, Tim Daisy, Ra-Kalam Bob Moses
