= Vincent Courtois =

French jazz cellist

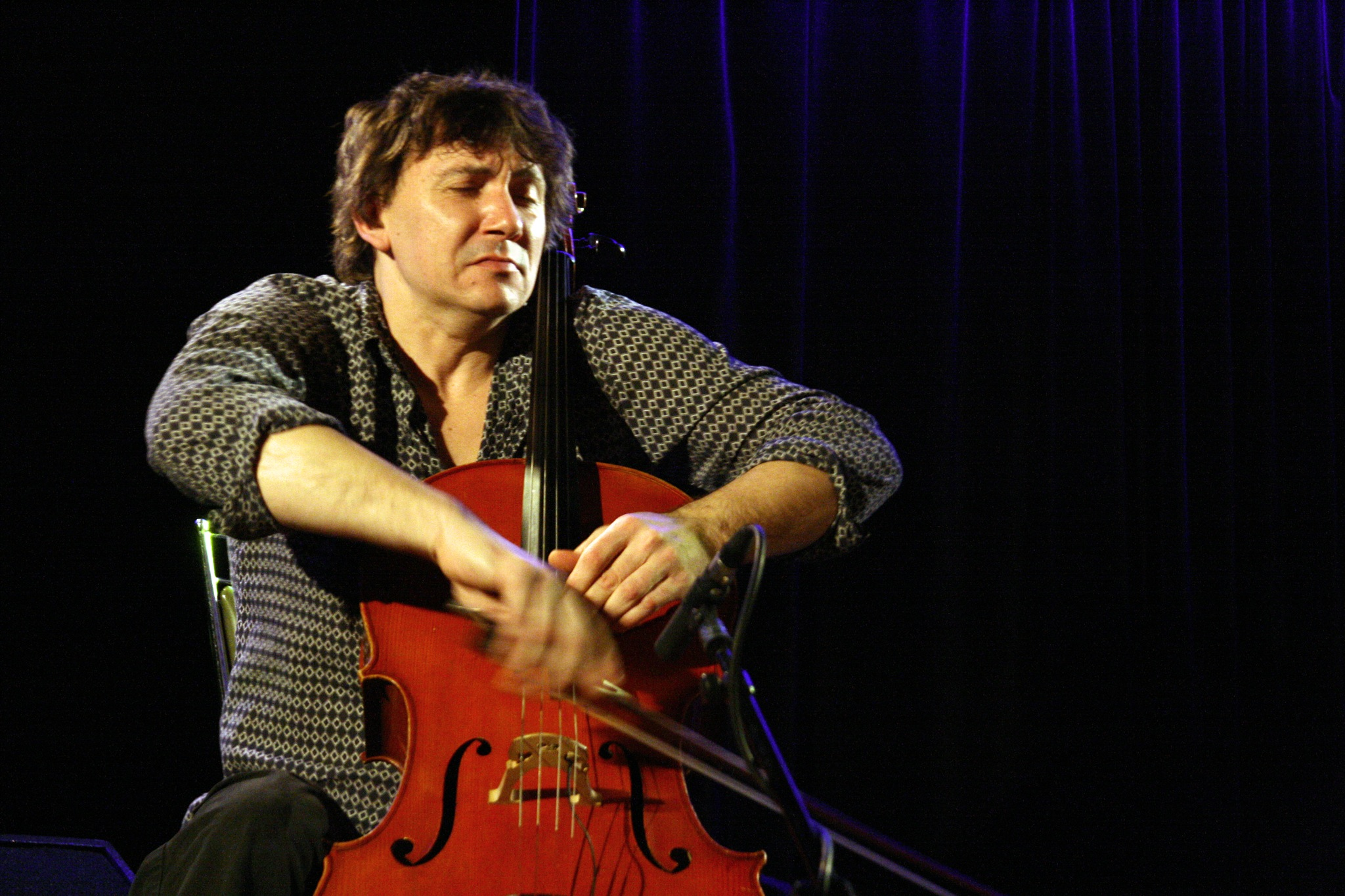
- Le Triton, Les Lilas (2007)

Background information
- Born: 21 March 1968 (age 58); Paris, France
- Genres: Jazz
- Occupation: Musician
- Instrument: Cello
- Website: violoncelle.free.fr

Vincent Courtois (born 21 March 1968) is a French jazz cellist.

== Biography ==
Courtois studied classical cello at the Conservatory of Aubervilliers, first with Erwan Fauré, and then with Roland Pidoux and Frédéric Lodéon. He also played Didier Levallet and Dominique Pifarély, and since 1988 in bandslead by Christian Escoudé and Didier Levallet ("Swing String System") in Paris. In addition he started his own quartet in 1990, releasing his debut solo album Cello News the same year.

He played in the duo with Martial Solal from 1993, with Julien Lourau in "Pendulum Quartet", with Franck Tortiller in the band "Tukish Blend" and the trio "Zebra 3", and in addition he played with Xavier Desandre Navarre. He has also contributed to the album Marvellous (1994) with Michel Petrucciani, Tony Williams and Dave Holland.

In 1995 Courtois performed his first solo concerts, he played within François Corneloup's Septett, and collaborated with Louis Sclavis making music for film and theatre. He also recorded two albums with the quintet of Rabih Abou-Khalil, and in 1998 he participated in an ensemble led by Pierre Favre, and a trio with Yves Robert. In 2000 he performed in three trio constellations, in 2002 a quintet played at the festival "Banlieues Bleues", and in a trio with Ellery Eskelin and Sylvie Courvoisier.

In 2005 Courtois joined Michele Rabbia and Marilyn Crispell to play in Bamako with his own trio. He was involved with Henri Texiers in recording the music to the movie Holy Lola by Bertrand Tavernier. In 2006 he initiated a new quartet with Jeanne Lagt, Marc Baron and François Merville. In 2008 he released the album L' homme avion with Ze Jam Afane.

== Discography ==
=== As leader ===
- 1990: Cello News (Nocturne), with Vincent Courtois Quartet (Pierre Christophe, Benoit Dunoyer de Segonzac, Serge Gacon)
- 1991: Pleine Lune (Nocturne), with Pierre Christophe, Xavier Desandre, Benoît Dunoyer de Segonzac, Serge Gacon, and Julien Loureau
- 1994: Turkish Blend (Al Sur), with Gilles Andrieux
- 1995: Pendulum Quartet (Bond Age), with Julien Lourau, Benoit Dunoyer de Segonzac, and Daniel Garcia Bruno
- 2000: Translucide (Enja), with Noël Akchoté, Michel Godard, and Yves Robert
- 2001: The Fitting Room (Enja), with Marc Ducret and Dominique Pifarély
- 2003: Les Contes de Rose Manivelle (Le Triton)
- 2005: Trio Rouge with Lucilla Galeazzi and Michel Godard
- 2006: What Do You Mean By Silence? (Le Triton), with Vincent Courtois Quartet
- 2008: L'homme Avion (Chief Inspector), with Ze Jam Afane
- 2008: As Soon As Possible (C.A.M. Jazz), with Sylvie Courvoisier and Ellery Eskelin
- 2010: L'Imprévu (La Buissonne)
- 2011: Live In Berlin (Le Triton), with Vincent Courtois Quartet
- 2012: Mediums (La Buissonne)
- 2014: West (La Buissonne)
- 2017: Bandes Originales (La Buissonne), with Daniel Erdmann, Robin Fincker

=== Collaborations ===
With Stefano Battaglia/Michele Rabbia/Dominique Pifarély/Michel Godard

- 2002: Atem (Splasc(H))

With John Greaves, Sophia Domancich

- 2003: The Trouble with Happiness (Le Chant du Monde)

With Michael Riessler & Singer Pur

- 2004: Ahi Vita (ACT)

With Michele Rabbia and Marilyn Crispell

- 2006: Shifting Grace (CAM Jazz)

With Daniel Erdmann, Samuel Rohrer and Frank Möbus

- 2011: How to Catch a Cloud (Intakt)
- 2013: From the Inside of a Cloud (Arjunamusic)
- 2015: Ten Songs About Real Utopia (Arjunamusic)

With Joëlle Léandre

- 2014: Live at Kesselhaus Berlin 08.06.2013 (Jazzdor Series)

With Louis Sclavis and Dominique Pifarely

- 2017: Asian Field Variations (ECM)

With Seb Brun and Robin Fincker

- 2019: Les démons de Tosca (BMC)

With Adam Bałdych

- 2020: Clouds (ACT), with Adam Bałdych, violin and Rogier Telderman, piano

With Fie Schouten clarinets

- 2026: Open Space (Relative Pitch Records)
- 2023: VOSTOK Remote Islands (Relative Pitch Records)

With Aki Takase

- 2023: Carmen Rhapsody (BMC)

With Daniel Erdmann and Robin Fincker

- 2023: Nothing Else (BMC)

With Sanne Rambags and Julian Sartorius

- 2023 : Twigs (BMC)

With Tom Bourgois Quartet & Veronika Harcsa

- 2025 : Lili (BMC)

With Colin Vallon

- 2025 A Simple Fall (BMC)

=== As sideman ===
With Rabih Abou-Khalil

- Yara (Enja, 1998)
- The Cactus of Knowledge (Enja, 2001)
