= Dominique Pifarély =

French jazz violinist

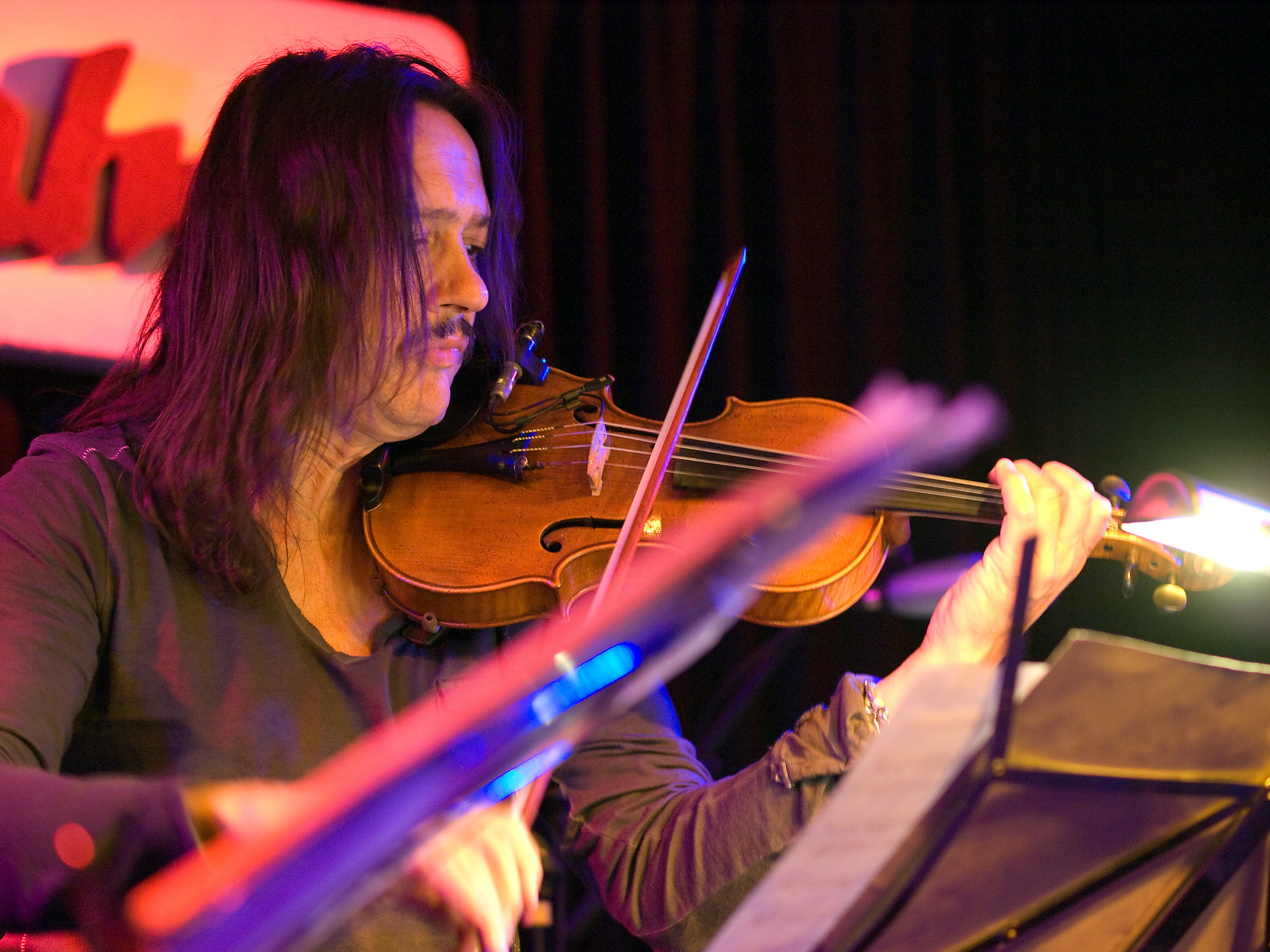
- Pifarély live at Jazz Club Unterfahrt, Munich, 7 October 2010

Background information
- Born: 1957 (age 67–68); Bègles, France
- Genres: Jazz
- Occupation(s): Musician, composer, music conductor
- Instrument: Violin
- Labels: ECM
- Website: pifarely.net

Dominique Pifarély (born 1957) is a French jazz violinist. He works in avant-garde jazz, but he has also worked in post-bop and other contexts.

== Career ==
Pifarély was born in Bègles. In 1979, he began touring with bassist Didier Levallet and guitarist Gérard Marais as a trio. In the 1980s he began leading his own bands, as can be heard on the recording Insula Dulcamara (1988) and Oblique (1992).

In 1985, Pifarély started to work with reedist Louis Sclavis and in 1992, they formed the Sclavis/Pifarély Acoustic Quartet, featuring guitarist Marc Ducret and double bassist Bruno Chevillon, and recorded for ECM. In the late 1990s, he started a duo work with pianist François Couturier, and they recorded an album (Poros, ECM, 1997).

Impromptu is a collaboration with François Couturier, Dominique Visse, and a work on contemporary poetry. He also initiated text/music experiences with French writer François Bon and actors Violaine Schwartz and Pierre Baux. The Dédales ensemble is an acoustic nine-piece band. In 2007 he founded a trio with keyboard player Julien Padovani and drummer Eric Groleau.

He performs in Europe and has toured in the U.S., Canada, Japan, India, Middle East, Latin America, and Africa.

== Discography ==
=== As leader ===
- Acoustic Quartet with Lous Sclavis (ECM, 1994)
- Triplicity with Stefano Battaglia and Paolino dalla Porta (Dischi Della Quercia, 1995)
- Poros with François Couturier (ECM, 1998)
- Time Before and Time After (ECM, 2015)

=== As sideman ===
With Tim Berne

- Insomnia (Clean Feed)

With Safy Boutella

- Mejnoun (Indigo)

With Jean-Paul Celea and François Couturier

- Black Moon, quartet with François Laizeau (Blue Silver)

With Vincent Courtois

- Pleine lune (Nocturne)
- The Fitting Room, trio with Marc Ducret (Enja)

With Marc Ducret

- Qui parle? (Sketch)
- Tower, Vol. 2 (Ayler)

With Rabih Abou-Khalil

- Yara (Enja, 1998)
- Yara, with Nabil Khayat and Vincent Courtois (Enja)

With Didier Levallet

- Paris-suite (Evidence)
- Eurydice (Evidence)

With Eddy Louiss

- Sang mêlé (Nocturne)
- Multicolor Feeling (Nocturne)

With Michele Rabbia and Stefano Battaglia

- Atem, with Michel Godard, Vincent Courtois (Splash)
- Raccolto (ECM 1933/34)

With Samo Salamon

- Stretching Out (Samo Records, 2013)

With Louis Sclavis

- Chine (IDA, 1987 reissued on Label Bleu)
- Chamber Music (IDA, 1989 reissued on Label Bleu)
- Ellington on the Air (IDA, 1992)
- Rouge (ECM, 1992)
- Les violences de Rameau (ECM, 1996)
- Danses et autres scènes (Label Bleu, 1997)
- Dans la nuit (ECM, 2002)

With Mike Westbrook

- On Duke's Birthday (Hat ART, 1985)
- The Orchestra of Smith's Academy (Enja)
