= Morton's Foot =

Studio album by Rabih Abou-Khalil
- Released: 2003
- Recorded: February 25–March 6, 2003
- Studio: Sound Studio, Zerkall, Germany
- Genre: Jazz, world music
- Length: 68:17
- Label: Enja; ENJ 9462
- Producer: Rabih Abou-Khalil, Walter Quintus

Rabih Abou-Khalil chronology
Il Sospiro (2002)	Morton's Foot (2003)	Journey to the Centre of an Egg (2005)

Morton's Foot is an album by the Lebanese oud player and composer Rabih Abou-Khalil which was recorded in Germany in 2003 and released on the Enja label.

== Reception ==
Professional ratings
Review scores
Source	Rating
AllMusic	4/5 stars
The Guardian	3/5 stars
All About Jazz	3/5 stars

The AllMusic review by Thom Jurek stated "The band on Morton's Foot is a truly international ensemble. ... Abou-Khalil's compositions here, as on his other recordings, involve detailed, complex, and labyrinthine melodic structures, though rhythmic invention and harmonic counterpoint add balance and offer tight turns of phrase and dynamic shifts. ... it is the sum of everything here that makes this one of Abou-Khalil's very best outings".

In The Guardian, John Fordham wrote "Lebanese oud player, flautist and composer Rabih Abou-Khalil is doing what he does best: situating his shapely instrumental virtuosity within the unique ensemble that combines cafe-accordion whimsy, fluid contemporary jazz, Italian-wedding clarinet, New Orleans street-music tuba and a mix of punchy swing".

All About Jazz said "The international ensemble that performs on Morton's Foot brings its array of influences together for a freeform improv-rich jam that feels joyful even its most pensive moments ... This is a top pick of 2004, without a doubt" and John Kelman wrote "Abou-Khalil's recordings are never short of completely engrossing, blending his ethnic heritage with spirited and joyous playing in contexts that never cease to surprise. If an artist came out with but one album as good as Morton's Foot, he/she would be assured a place in jazz history; but the truth is Abou-Khalil manages to succeed at this level with almost every release". Jim Santella observed "Abou-Khalil covers a wide range with his compositional use of threads that cross cultures. He's included blatant comedy, dramatic intensity, and sensual passion in his structures. The ensemble responds with spontaneous interpretations that flow seamlessly. Abou-Khalil's music holds something for everyone".

== Track listing ==
All compositions by Rabih Abou-Khalil

1. "Ma Muse M'abuse" – 6:22
2. "Morton's Foot" – 8:12
3. "Il Ritorno del Languore" – 7:24
4. "Lobotomie Mi Baba Lu" – 7:11
5. "L'histoire d'un Parapluie" – 6:04
6. "O Papaia Balerina" – 6:17
7. "Dr. Gieler's Wiener Schnitzel" – 7:16
8. "Il Sospiro" – 6:52
9. "Hopping Jack" – 7:33
10. "Waltz for Dubbya" – 4:07
11. "The Return of the Maltese Chicken" – 0:11

== Personnel ==
- Rabih Abou-Khalil – oud
- Michel Godard – tuba
- Gabriele Mirabassi – clarinet
- Luciano Biondini – accordion
- Gavino Murgia – vocals
- Jarrod Cagwin – drums, frame drums
