= The Wound (1998 film) =

1998 Turkish drama film

- Theatrical Poster
- Directed by: Yılmaz Arslan
- Written by: Yılmaz Arslan
- Produced by: Yılmaz Arslan; Murat Kadıoğlu
- Starring: Yelda Reynaud; Halil Ergün; Füsun Demirel; Mustafa Suphi Baltacı; Nazım Yılmaz; Kader Demir
- Cinematography: Jürgen Jürges
- Music by: Rabih Abou-Khalil
- Production companies: Vega Film; Gün İzi Film Prodüksiyon
- Release date: 7 September 1998
- Running time: 98 minutes
- Countries: Turkey; Germany; Switzerland; Austria
- Language: Turkish

The Wound (Turkish: Yara) is a 1998 international co-production drama film, written, produced and directed by Yılmaz Arslan, starring Yelda Reynaud as a young Turkish emigrant who is forcibly repatriated by her own family. The film, which went on nationwide general release across Turkey on 4 February 2000, won awards at film festivals in Antalya and Istanbul, including the Golden Orange for Best Film.

== Production ==
The film was shot on location in Heidelberg and Frankfurt am Main, Germany and, Aksaray and Istanbul, Turkey.

== Reception ==
Variety reviewer David Stratton said "Yara succeeds on one level: as a portrait of an independent femme’s struggle to escape her environment and survive against all the odds stacked against her. But pic suffers from melodramatic elements and a lack of motivation, making for dim international commercial prospects".

== Musical score and soundtrack ==
Yara

Soundtrack album by Rabih Abou-Khalil
- Released: 1998
- Recorded: 4–6 June 1998
- Studios: Studio Zerkall, Hürtgenwald, Germany
- Genre: Film score
- Length: 55:41
- Labels: Enja; ENJ 9360
- Producers: Rabih Abou-Khalil, Walter Quintus

Rabih Abou-Khalil chronology
Odd Times (1997)	Yara (1998)	The Cactus of Knowledge (2001)

The film score was composed, by Rabih Abou-Khalil and the soundtrack album was released on the Enja label in 1998.

=== Reception ===
Professional ratings
Review scores
Source	Rating
AllMusic	4/5 stars

Allmusic's Michael G. Nastos noted, "the music of Khalil does stand beautifully on its own ... Selections flow freely into each other, much unison playing between the string instruments is prevalent, and Khalil takes the bulk of the lead ... There's pure wonder and revelation in this music. You'll have to see the film to get the full gist, but without the moving pictures, Khalil's unique music is indeed a moving experience in and of its own accord. Recommended". In JazzTimes, Josef Woodard said "Yara emerges here as a set of tunes standing up on its own musical merits-with cinematic evocations, but also a coherent life of its own. The pieces tend to be based on linear, horizontal constructions, entrancingly winding melodies ... this chamber setting conveys a sense of melancholic elegance, alternately bustling with subtle energy and purring with a sad, languid beauty".

=== Track listing ===
All compositions by Rabih Abou-Khalil

1. "Requiem" – 6:48
2. "Imminent Journey" – 1:17
3. "A Gracious Man" – 4:55
4. "On a Bus" – 4:16
5. "Grateful Parting" – 7:09
6. "The Passage of Life" – 4:05
7. "Through the Window" – 5:43
8. "Lithe Dream" – 5:38
9. "Puppet Master" – 3:42
10. "Bint el Bahr" – 6:47
11. "The End of Faith" – 2:16
12. "The Knowledge of a Child" – 2:19

=== Personnel ===
- Rabih Abou-Khalil – oud
- Dominique Pifarély – violin
- Vincent Courtois – cello
- Nabil Khaiat – frame drums
