= The Sultan's Picnic =

Studio album by Rabih Abou-Khalil
- Released: 1994
- Recorded: March 13–16, 1994
- Studio: Sound Studio N, Köln, Germany
- Genre: Jazz, world music
- Length: 51:30
- Label: Enja; ENJ 8078
- Producer: Rabih Abou-Khalil

Rabih Abou-Khalil chronology
| Tarab (1993) | The Sultan's Picnic (1994) | Arabian Waltz (1996) |

The Sultan's Picnic is an album by the Lebanese oud player and composer Rabih Abou-Khalil, fusing traditional Arab music with jazz, which was recorded in 1994 and released on the Enja label.

== Reception ==
Professional ratings
Review scores
| Source | Rating |
|---|---|
| Allmusic | 4.5/5 stars |

The Allmusic review by Kurt Keefner stated "Composer and oudist Rabih Abou-Khalil generates variety and interest by bringing aboard different guest musicians for each album. The personnel on Sultan's Picnic is so similar to that of Blue Camel that one might expect them to sound similar. But there's a key difference in the presence of Howard Levy ... a talented harmonica player who has done a lot of offbeat work ... Despite the power of Charlie Mariano on alto sax and Kenny Wheeler on trumpet, this album is dominated by the idioms of the harmonica, specifically the jazzy, quirky, lackadaisical idiom popularized by Levy's work with the Flecktones".

== Track listing ==
All compositions by Rabih Abou-Khalil

1. "Sunrise in Montreal" – 8:14
2. "Solitude" – 6:32
3. "Dog River" – 4:25
4. "Moments" – 6:17
5. "Lamentation" – 8:59
6. "Nocturne au Villaret" – 6:33
7. "The Happy Sheik" – 6:02
8. "Snake Soup" – 4:28

== Personnel ==
- Rabih Abou-Khalil – oud, bass oud
- Howard Levy – harmonica
- Kenny Wheeler – flugelhorn, trumpet
- Charlie Mariano – alto saxophone
- Michel Godard – tuba, serpent
- Steve Swallow – bass
- Mark Nauseef – drums
- Milton Cardona – congas
- Nabil Khaiat – frame drums
