= Nathan the Wise (film) =

1922 film by Manfred Noa

- Directed by: Manfred Noa
- Written by: Gotthold Ephraim Lessing (play); Hans Kyser
- Produced by: Erich Wagowski
- Starring: Fritz Greiner; Carl de Vogt; Lia Eibenschütz; Werner Krauss
- Cinematography: Hans Karl Gottschalk; Gustave Preiss
- Music by: Willy Schmidt-Gentner (uncredited)
- Production company: Bavaria Film
- Distributed by: Bavaria Film
- Release date: 29 December 1922
- Running time: 128 minutes
- Country: Germany
- Languages: Silent; German intertitles

Nathan the Wise (German: Nathan der Weise) is a 1922 German silent historical film directed by Manfred Noa and starring Fritz Greiner, Carl de Vogt and Lia Eibenschütz. It is based on the 1779 play Nathan the Wise by Gotthold Ephraim Lessing. It was made by Bavaria Film at the Emelka Studios. The film provoked protests in Munich from far-right groups who felt it was too pro-Jewish.

In 2010 oud player and composer Rabih Abou-Khalil released a soundtrack composed for the film entitled Trouble in Jerusalem.

== Plot ==
The film

One of the main works of the Age of Enlightenment, Lessing's play is a powerful plea for tolerance, humanity and freedom of opinion. Set in the age of the crusades, it deals with the relations between the three monotheistic religions. Characters include the historical figure of Sultan Saladin, and the Jewish merchant Nathan; the character of Nathan is based on Lessing's friend, the renowned philosopher Moses Mendelssohn. When the play was published in 1779, this was considered breaching a taboo.

== Cast ==
- Fritz Greiner as Sultan Saladin
- Carl de Vogt as Assad of Filneck / Young Templar
- Lia Eibenschütz as Sittah
- Werner Krauss as Nathan
- Bella Muzsnay as Recha
- Margarete Kupfer as Daja
- Rudolf Lettinger as Brother Bonafides
- Ferdinand Martini as Al-Hafi
- Ernst Schrumpf as the Patriarch of Jerusalem
- Max Schreck as the Great Master of the Order of the Templar
- Wolfgang von Schwindt as the Emir of Kurdistan
- Ernst Matray as the Sultan's jester

== Bibliography ==
- Prawer, Siegbert Salomon (2007) [2005]. Between Two Worlds: The Jewish Presence in German and Austrian Film, 1910–1933. Berghahn Books. ISBN 978-1-84545-303-9.
