= Em Português =

Studio album by Rabih Abou-Khalil
- Released: 2008
- Recorded: September 3–9, 2007
- Studio: Sound Studio, Zerkall, Germany
- Genre: Jazz, world music
- Length: 59:22
- Label: Enja; ENJ 9520
- Producer: Rabih Abou-Khalil, Walter Quintus

Rabih Abou-Khalil chronology
| Songs for Sad Women (2007) | Em Português (2008) | Trouble in Jerusalem (2010) |

Em Português is an album by the Lebanese oud player and composer Rabih Abou-Khalil which was recorded in Germany in 2007 and released on the Enja label the following year.

== Reception ==
Professional ratings
Review scores
| Source | Rating |
|---|---|
| Allmusic | 4/5 stars |
| The Guardian | 3/5 stars |
| All About Jazz | 4.5/5 stars |
| PopMatters | 8/10 stars |

The Allmusic review by Michael G. Nastos stated "Oud master Rabih Abou-Khalil has been known to mix and match various ethnic strains, but in the case of Em Portugues, he's outdone himself. The music has the obvious Middle Eastern tinge you would expect, but also sounds more like a head-on collision of fado and Hasidic or klezmer music underneath heavily sexual Brazilian sounds. What is most striking is that what Abou-Khalil has concocted sounds nothing like any of these distinct musics individually, but more a brand-new hybrid that only he could provide a definition for. It's a powerful, driving, feverish sound that speaks a strong emotional language .... A recording for specific tastes and the leader's fans, it certainly gives food for thought as to what will be the next move from the brilliant bandleader and single-minded world musician, who continues to be in a class by himself".

In The Guardian, John L Walters wrote "it's a deliciously odd idea - Portuguese poems set to music by a composer (Abou-Khalil) who didn't at the time speak a word of the language, and performed by an international band, fronted by Ricardo Ribeiro, the young fado singer from Lisbon. Of course it's a triumph - Abou-Khalil is one of those magicians who can always pull something out of the hat. His rhythmic sensibilities support Ribeiro with a propulsion that wraps fado's sensibilities around a robust spine. ... Abou-Khalil's settings have a spirited tunefulness and a Moorish, Mediterranean flavour that recalls Radio Tarifa".

All About Jazz reviewer Ian Patterson noted "The project sees Abou-Khalil utilizing a singer for the first time—the impressive fadoist Ricardo Ribeiro. Em Portugues however, is not fado, but a marriage between its poetic, blues spirit and the imagination of Abou-Khalil. The music lies firmly in the bed of the rhythmic complexities and melodies stemming from his Arabic roots and wider musical vision. The result is both challenging and powerful".

PopMatters' Deanne Sole rated the album 8 stars out of 10, saying, "There's a feeling of power in this album, of adult strength being channelled and directed towards a common goal, the sound of years of experience being tapped. It's delicious".

== Track listing ==
All compositions by Rabih Abou-Khalil

1. "Como um Rio" – 6:08
2. "No Mar das Tuas Pernas" – 2:46
3. "A Lua Num Quarto" – 4:33
4. "Amarrado à Sausade" – 3:35
5. "Já Não dá Como Esta" – 4:12
6. "Se O Meu Amor Me Pedisse" – 3:02
7. "Quando Te Vejo Sorrir" – 6:54
8. "Casa da Mariquinhas" – 5:59
9. "Beijos Ateus" – 8:29
10. "A Gaivota Que Tu És" – 3:48
11. "Jogo da Vida" – 6:18
12. "Adolescência Perdida" – 3:38

== Personnel ==
- Rabih Abou-Khalil – oud
- Ricardo Ribeiro – vocals
- Luciano Biondini – accordion
- Michel Godard – bass, serpent, tuba
- Jarrod Cagwin – drums, frame drums
