= Arabian Waltz =

Studio album by Rabih Abou-Khalil
- Released: 1996
- Recorded: September 22–26 and December 18–23, 1995
- Studios: SWF Studio, Baden-Baden and CMP Studio, Zerkall, Germany.
- Genres: Jazz, world music, contemporary classical music
- Length: 57:50
- Labels: Enja; ENJ 9059
- Producer: Rabih Abou-Khalil

Rabih Abou-Khalil chronology
The Sultan's Picnic (1994)	Arabian Waltz (1996)	Odd Times (1997)

Arabian Waltz is an album by the Lebanese oud player and composer Rabih Abou-Khalil, featuring the Balanescu Quartet, which was recorded in 1995 and released on the Enja label the following year.

== Reception ==
Professional ratings
Review scores
Source	Rating
Allmusic	4.5/5 stars

The Allmusic review by Kurt Keefner called it "the pinnacle of Rabih Abou-Khalil's achievement as a composer and arranger" and stated "It is a sublime fusion of jazz, Middle Eastern traditional music, and Western classical ... This recording suits every fan of world music, jazz, classical, or just good music".

== Track listing ==
All compositions by Rabih Abou-Khalil

1. "Arabian Waltz" – 8:10
2. "Dreams of a Dying City" – 12:08
3. "Ornette Never Sleeps" – 6:58
4. "Georgina" – 11:09
5. "No Visa" – 9:59
6. "The Pain After" – 9:26

== Personnel ==
- Rabih Abou-Khalil – oud
- Michel Godard – tuba, serpent
- Nabil Khaiat – frame drums
- Balanescu Quartet:
  - Alexander Bălănescu – violin
  - Clare Connors – violin
  - Paul Martin – viola
  - David Cunliffe – violincello
