= Odd Times =

Live album by Rabih Abou-Khalil
- Released: 1997
- Recorded: May 11–13, 1997
- Venue: Stadtgarten, Köln, Germany
- Genre: Jazz, world music
- Length: 64:12
- Label: Enja; ENJ 9330
- Producer: Rabih Abou-Khalil, Howard Levy, Michel Godard, Mark Nauseef, Nabil Khaiat, Walter Quintus

Rabih Abou-Khalil chronology
Arabian Waltz (1996)	Odd Times (1997)	Yara (1998)

Odd Times is a live album by the Lebanese oud player and composer Rabih Abou-Khalil which was recorded in Germany in 1997 and released on the Enja label.

== Reception ==
Professional ratings
Review scores
Source	Rating
Allmusic	2.5/5 stars

The Allmusic review by Kurt Keefner stated "Odd Times is Rabih Abou-Khalil's first live album. Since it would be impractical to assemble all of the guests he has had on his albums over the years, Abou-Khalil has gone in the other direction and pared his ensemble down to what is for him the bare bones ... Most live albums contain well-known pieces from the artist's studio repertoire; in contrast, Odd Times is mostly new material. In general, the album is a mix of shapeless, overlong attempts at atmosphere and fairly bouncy and fun items ... The pared-down lineup is engaging because Abou-Khalil's oud and Godard's tuba are more prominent; unfortunately, Levy's harmonica is also pronounced, and simply clashes with the entire project of fusing Arabic music and jazz".

== Track listing ==
All compositions by Rabih Abou-Khalil

1. "The Sphinx and I" – 5:44
2. "Dr. Gieler's Prescription" – 5:15
3. "Elephant Hips" – 10:15
4. "Q-Tips" – 4:34
5. "Son of Ben Hur" – 11:29
6. "The Happy Sheik" – 9:32
7. "One Of Those Days" – 10:31
8. "Rabou-Abou-Kabou" – 6:52

== Personnel ==
- Rabih Abou-Khalil – oud, bass oud
- Howard Levy – harmonica
- Michel Godard – tuba, serpent
- Mark Nauseef – drums
- Nabil Khaiat – frame drums
