= Ramesh Shotham =

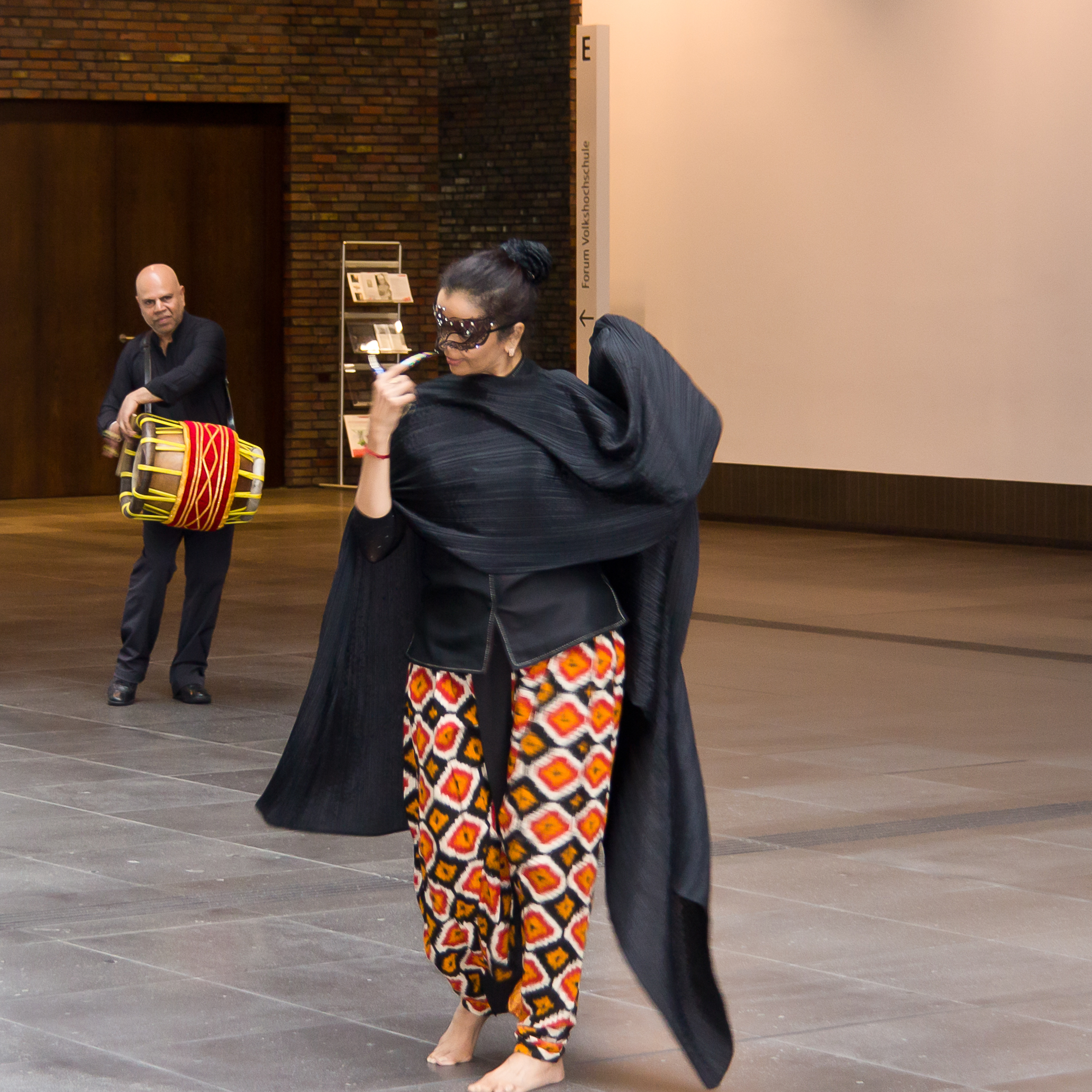
- Ramesh Shotham (background)

Background information
- Origin: Madras, South India
- Genres: Jazz, Fusion, Rock
- Occupation: Musician
- Instrument(s): percussion, drums
- Years active: 1970–present

Ramesh Shotham (born May 7, 1948 in Madras, Tamil Nadu, India) is a percussionist and drummer.

== Life ==
Ramesh Shotham was born in Madras, South India. He graduated with a degree in zoology from Loyola College, University of Madras. He began his musical career as a self-taught drummer, co-leading a rock band called Human Bondage established in 1970 in Bombay and Bangalore then hitting the road gigging in clubs all over the subcontinent. Musical influences at this stage were The Beatles, The Rolling Stones, Jimi Hendrix, Led Zeppelin, and others. It took a live Ravi Shankar concert in Delhi, and a chance meeting with a tourist, who was heading back West and wanted to hock his albums, amongst them ‘Birds of Fire’ by the Mahavishnu Orchestra, for Shotham to begin discovering his musical roots: the vast ocean of Indian music.

During the mid-seventies Shotham returned to Madras to take up study of the thavil (a traditional temple music drum), under Vidwan K.P.Ramu. Since then, he has lived and worked in Europe. Shotam is recognized as one of the most successful percussionists around. He has performed not only with leading European and American Jazz and Rock musicians, but also with artists from Africa, Australia, China, Korea and several Arabic countries. During the last 20-odd years, Shotham has recorded over 250 LPs and CDs and has worked for almost all the leading TV and Radio stations in Germany and Europe. In Mid-2000, he and his wife Alexandra established an independent record company called Permission Music Productions.

In 1987 Shotham was responsible for introducing the late mridangam artist TAS Mani and his Karnataka College of Percussion (KCP) to the German rock group Embryo, paving the way for Mani's popularity in Europe.

His current solo project, Madras Special, features Christian Zurner on electric bass, Zoltan Lantos on violin and Sandhya Sanjana on vocals.

== Discography ==
- Open Hand (Keytone, 1993/97)
- Madras Special (Permission Music, 2002)
- Urban Folklore (Double Moon, 2006)

== As guest musician ==
- Embryo : La Blama Sparozzi ( Schneeball Rec., 1982)
- Embryo : Turn Peace (Schneeball Rec., 1989)
- Rabih Abou Khalil: Between Dusk and Dawn (MMP, 1987; Enja Records, 1993)
- Rabih Abou Khalil: Bukra (MMP, 1988; Enja Records, 1994)
- Rabih Abou Khalil: Al-Jadida (Enja Records, 1990)
- Rabih Abou Khalil: Blue Camel (Enja Records, 1992)
- Rabih Abou Khalil: Tarab (Enja Records, 1993)
- Aziza Mustafa Zadeh: Seventh Truth (Columbia, 1996)
- Charlie Mariano: Nassim (1998)
- Nicolas Simion: Balkan Jazz (Intuition Music, 2001)
- Various Artists: Karma Culture: 21 Asian Pearl CD (Cop International, 2003)
- Abaji: Music of a Nomad (Network, 2005)
- Mariano, Schenk, Shotham: The Tamarind Tree (2007)
- Omri Hason: Shati (Double Moon, 2008)
- Hermann Kock: Two Trios (2008)
- Embryo: 40 (Trikont,2010)
