= Al-Jadida (album) =

Studio album by Rabih Abou-Khalil
- Released: 1991
- Recorded: October 8–10, 1990
- Studios: Tonstudio Bauer, Ludwigsburg, Germany
- Genres: Jazz, Arab music
- Length: 58:44
- Labels: Enja; ENJ 6090
- Producer: Rabih Abou-Khalil

Rabih Abou-Khalil chronology
Roots & Sprouts (1990)	Al-Jadida (1991)	Blue Camel (1992)

Al-Jadida is an album by the Lebanese oud player and composer Rabih Abou-Khalil, fusing traditional Arab music with jazz, which was recorded in 1990 and released on the Enja label the following year.

== Reception ==
Professional ratings
Review scores
Source	Rating
AllMusic	3/5 stars

The AllMusic review by Ron Wynn stated "Rabih Abou-Khalil, among the rare Arabic musicians who have recorded and played extensively with jazz musicians, successfully navigates the middle ground between traditional North African sounds and hard bop. Besides the leader's oud and flute, alto saxophonist Sonny Fortune provides the blues bite; bassist Glen Moore, the rhythmic connection, and percussionists Ramesh Shotham and Nabil Khaiat, provide the African seasoning".

== Track listing ==
All compositions by Rabih Abou-Khalil

1. "Catania" – 7:41
2. "Nashwa" – 9:33
3. "An Evening with Jerry" – 6:59
4. "When the Lights Go Out" – 7:14
5. "Storyteller" – 8:52
6. "Ornette Never Sleeps" – 4:01
7. "Nadim" – 8:29
8. "Wishing Well" – 5:25

== Personnel ==
- Rabih Abou-Khalil – oud
- Sonny Fortune – alto saxophone
- Glen Moore – bass
- Ramesh Shotham – South Indian drums, percussion
- Nabil Khaiat – frame drums
