= Journey to the Centre of an Egg =

Studio album by Rabih Abou-Khalil, Joachim Kühn and Jarrod Cagwin
- Released: 2005
- Recorded: February 10–15, 2004
- Studio: Sound Studio, Zerkall, Germany
- Genre: Jazz, world music
- Length: 52:24
- Label: Enja; ENJ 9479
- Producer: Rabih Abou-Khalil, Joachim Kühn, Walter Quintus

Rabih Abou-Khalil chronology
Morton's Foot (2003)	Journey to the Centre of an Egg (2005)	Songs for Sad Women (2007)

Journey to the Centre of an Egg is an album by the Lebanese oud player Rabih Abou-Khalil with German pianist Joachim Kühn and percussionist Jarrod Cagwin which was recorded in Germany in 2004 and released on the Enja label the following year.

== Reception ==
Professional ratings
Review scores
Source	Rating
All About Jazz	4/5 stars
All About Jazz	3/5 stars

All About Jazz said "Working with Rabih Abou-Khalil is tricky business since he incorporates such a wide range of styles into his music. He doesn't just adapt the oud to a jazz context, he warps and stretches the fabric of improvisation and composition to incorporate a variety of Mediterranean influences. ... The record sounds unusually warm and crisp, which you can really appreciate when you pay close attention—which is generally a good idea anyway, if you want to get the most out of this intelligent, involving multicultural music". Jim Santella observed "Journey to the Centre of an Egg shifts to various parts of the globe, combining mainstream jazz with world music. Most of the flavor in their creations centers on the Middle Eastern tradition ... Thus, oud, piano and percussion revel in their respective theaters of operation, creating a musical landscape representing influences from a sizable portion of the world's music".

== Track listing ==
All compositions by Rabih Abou-Khalil and Joachim Kühn

1. "Shrewd Woman" – 3:38
2. "Little Camels" – 2:46
3. "Die Brücke" – 5:47
4. "I'm Better Off Without You" – 11:12
5. "Natwasheh and Kadwasheh" – 13:27
6. "Mango" – 7:25
7. "No Plastic Cups, Please" – 3:17
8. "Sweet and Sour Milk" – 4:20

== Personnel ==
- Rabih Abou-Khalil – oud
- Joachim Kühn – piano, alto saxophone
- Jarrod Cagwin – drums, frame drums
- Wolfgang Reisinger – drums (tracks 5 & 6)
