= Balanescu Quartet =

Avant-garde string ensemble

- Years active: 1987–present
- Members: Alexander Bălănescu; Yuri Kalnits; Úna Palliser; Nick Holland
- Past members: Katie Wilkinson; James Shenton; Helen Kamminga; Sian Bell; Jonathan Carney; Clare Connors; Nick Cooper; Caroline Dale; Bill Hawkes; Anthony Hinnigan; Kate Musker; Andrew Parker; Paul Martin
- Website: https://www.facebook.com/BalanescuQuartet/

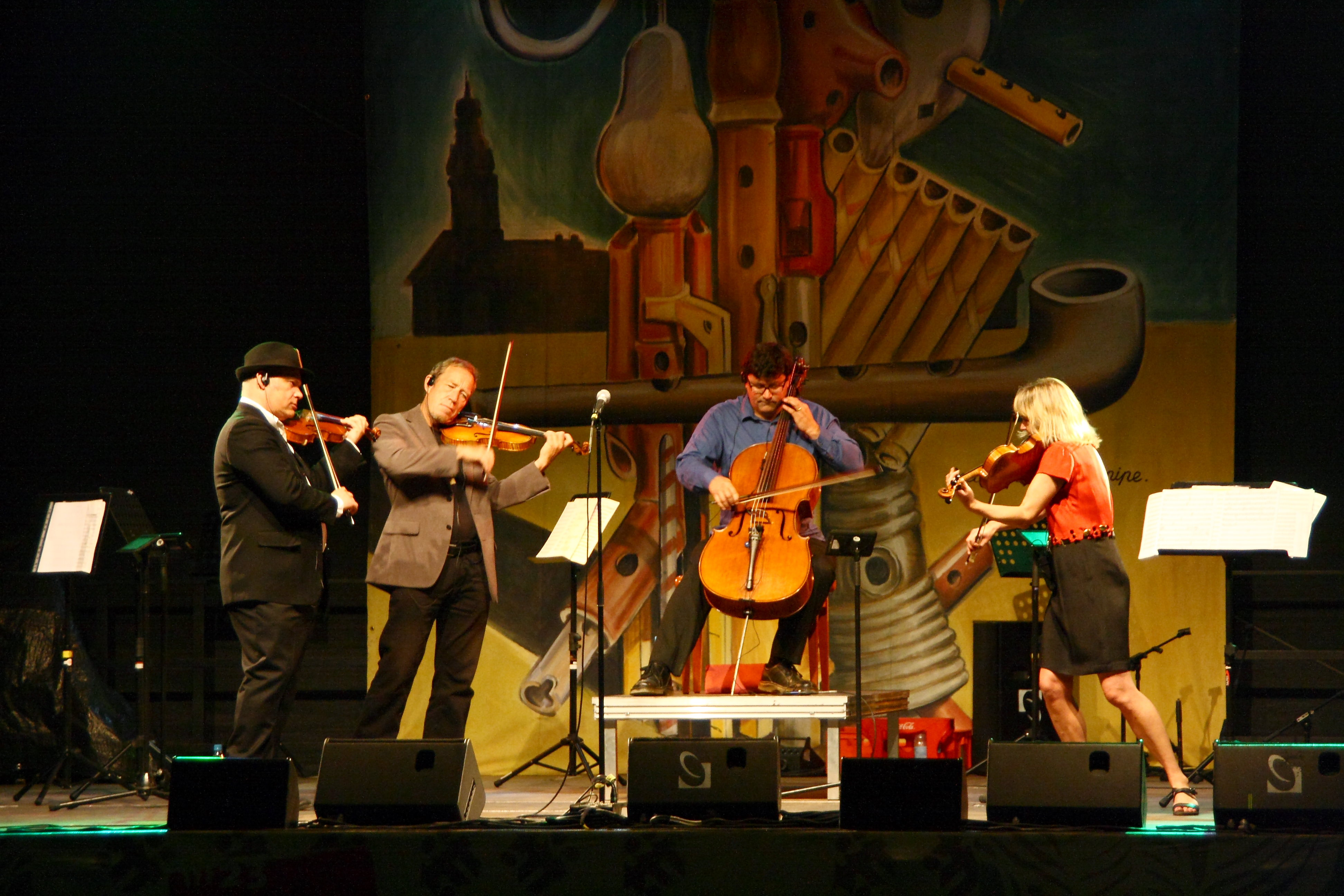
The Balanescu Quartet at TFF Rudolstadt 2013

Balanescu Quartet is an avant-garde string ensemble formed in 1987. Current members are Alexander Bălănescu (violin), Yuri Kalnits (violin), Úna Palliser (viola) and Nick Holland (cello).

== Group history ==
The quartet has roots in collaborations with composers such as Michael Nyman and Gavin Bryars, through projects with Lounge Lizard John Lurie, Jack de Johnette, Ornette Coleman, David Byrne, Pet Shop Boys, Spiritualized, Inspiral Carpets, Kate Bush and Kraftwerk. They have played in locations such as London's South Bank Centre and New York's Knitting Factory, and opened to 10000 Pet Shop Boys fans at Wembley Arena. Their recording of University Challenge's title music on BBC2 in the UK has been in use since 2000.

Their early albums were on Mute Records and Argo Records (UK).

== Recordings ==
- Possessed (1992)
- Luminitza (1994)
- Angels & Insects (1995) (soundtrack)
- East Meets East (1997)
- Maria T (2005)
- This Is The Balanescu Quartet (2011)
- Balanescu (2019)
- Michael Nyman - String Quartets 1-3 - featuring the Balanescu Quartet (1991)
- Balanescu Quartet Play Byrne/Moran/Lurie/Torke - featuring David Byrne, Robert Moran, John Lurie and Michael Torke (1992)
- Geoff Smith - Gas • Food • Lodging - featuring the Balanescu Quartet (1993)
- Kevin Volans - String Quartets Nos. 2 & 3 - performed by the Balanescu Quartet (1994)
- Gavin Bryars - The Last Days - featuring the Balanescu Quartet (1995)
- Spiritualized - Pure Phase (1995)
- Rabih Abou-Khalil - Arabian Waltz - featuring the Balanescu String Quartet (2002)
- Optimo - How To Kill The DJ (Part 2) - featuring music by the Balanescu Quartet (2004)
- Michael Torke - Six - featuring the Balanescu Quartet (2005)
- Stateless - Matilda featuring the Balanescu Quartet (2011)
- Ada Milea & Alexander Balanescu - The Island - featuring the Balanescu Quartet (2011)
- Teho Teardo - Diaz - featuring the Balanescu Quartet (2012) (soundtrack)
