= Evelina Petrova =

Russian composer and accordion player (born 1974)

Evelina Petrova (Russian: Эвелина Петрова; born 27 May 1974, in Kingisepp, Russia) is a Russian composer and accordion player.

== Early life ==
Evelina Petrova graduated from the Saint Petersburg Musical College and after that studied at Theater Academy in a class by Vyacheslav Gayvoronsky titled "The Theater of Musical Improvisation". She began with ensemble performances and eventually joined Gayvoronsky in a duo. In 2002, Evelina graduated from Saint Petersburg State Conservatory with a classical accordionist degree.

== Career ==
Since 1997, Evelina has performed in a duo with Gayvoronsky (trumpet).

In October 1998 at the Firth International Astor Piazzolla Competition in Castelfidardo, Italy, the duo was awarded the special prize for original music style.

In 1999, by vote of Russian music critics, Petrova was awarded Star of the Year.

Since 2001, Evelina has been playing with Saint Petersburg musician Victor Sobolenko (cello). The duo recorded an album called The Northern Tango with original music by Sobolenko in tango style with jazz elements.

Evelina also performs solo. She composed and performed for her debut solo album Year’s Cycle which was released in England in 2004. The album’s twelve tracks represent the twelve months of the year.

After her debut solo album, In 2007 and 2009, she released two CDs: Upside down with Alexander Balanescu, and Living water, which contains music from Evelina’s performance with dancer Tanya Khabarova. It was based on mythology, fairytales, and pagan rituals of ancient Russia.

== Collaborators ==
- Jethro Tull
- Alexander Balanescu
- Phil Milton
- Slava Gayvoronsky
- Iva Bittova
- Viktor Sobolenko
- Bert Van Laethem
- Miniature Musical Circus (UK)
- Tanya Khabarova (theater Derevo)
- Gisele Edwards (rope artist, UK)
- Alexander Balanescu

== Projects ==
- Alexander Balanescu (violin, GB)
- Performance "Timing of butterfly" with Tanya Khabarova (theater DEREVO)
- Viktor Sobolenko (cello, Russia) "The Northern Tango"
- Collaboration projects by SOUNDUK (England) with Balanescu and Miniature Musical Circus (London) "The Others". Ties with aerialist Gisele Edwards and director Emma Bernard (UK).
- Performances with black-white masterpieces: "Faust" by Friedrich Wilhelm Murnau, 1926, Germany; "The Unknown" Director Tod Browning, 1927, USA; short animation films by Lotte Rainiger.
- Composition "Vocalize" ("Shout" on the CD Upside Down)was featured in the film The Best of Times by Svetlana Proskurina.
- Fashion House "Lilia Kisselenko" (St.Petersburg) as a composer /www.kisselenko.ru/

== Discography ==
- Living water Leo Records 2009
- Upside down Leo Records 2007
- Year’s cycle Leo Records 2004
- The northern tango St. Petersburg 2002
- Homeless songs Solyd Records 2001
- Chonyi Together Leo Records 1999
- Postfactum Solyd Records 1999
