= Songs for Sad Women =

Studio album by Rabih Abou-Khalil
- Released: 2007
- Recorded: February 10–15, 2005
- Studio: Sound Studio, Zerkall, Germany
- Genre: Jazz, world music
- Length: 55:47
- Label: Enja; ENJ 9494
- Producer: Rabih Abou-Khalil, Walter Quintus

Rabih Abou-Khalil chronology
Journey to the Centre of an Egg (2005)	Songs for Sad Women (2007)	Em Português (2008)

Songs for Sad Women is an album by the Lebanese oud player and composer Rabih Abou-Khalil which was recorded in Germany in 2005 but not released on the Enja label until 2007.

== Reception ==
Professional ratings
Review scores
Source	Rating
All About Jazz	4.5/5 stars

All About Jazz reviewer Ian Patterson observed "On Songs for Sad Women Abou-Khalil marshals a stripped-down ensemble which plays with air akin to intimate chamber music, yet with the soul of timeless folk music ... This is a highly satisfying addition to Rabih Abou-Khalil's impressive discography; graceful and poetic, and one that lingers in the memory".

The BBC Music review by John Eyles stated "After twenty-five years and eighteen albums, it is unlikely that Rabih Abou-Khalil is going to spring any great surprises; long ago he found a distinctive individual style and has stuck to it since – with sufficient variations to keep it fresh and interesting. One need only hear this music for a few seconds to identify its creator. Aficionados will find everything that keeps them coming back for more; the characteristic blend of jazz-inflected Arabic melody with subtle rhythms combines into a hypnotic whole, as ever with Abou-Khalil’s fluent oud playing in a central role".

== Track listing ==
All compositions by Rabih Abou-Khalil

1. "Mourir Pour Ton Décolleté" – 7:29
2. "How Can We Dance If I Cannot Waltz" – 7:08
3. "Best If You Dressed Less" – 6:56
4. "The Sad Women of Qana" – 8:46
5. "Para O Teu Bumbum" – 7:08
6. "Le Train Bleu" – 6:55
7. "A Chocolate Love Affair" – 11:09

== Personnel ==
- Rabih Abou-Khalil – oud
- Gevorg Dabaghyan – duduk
- Michel Godard – serpent
- Jarrod Cagwin – drums, frame drums
