= Michel Godard (musician) =

French musician

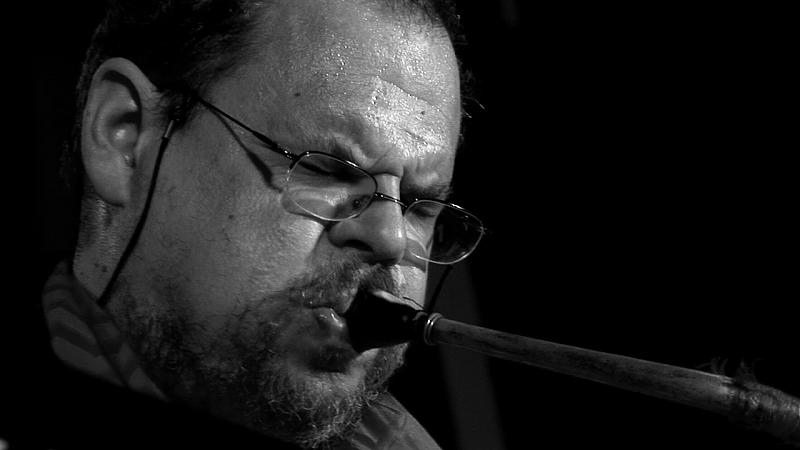

Background information
- Born: Héricourt, Belfort, France
- Genres: Avant-garde jazz, classical, improvised
- Occupations: Musician, composer
- Instruments: Tuba, serpent
- Years active: 1978–present
- Labels: CAM Jazz
- Website: en.ambresiamusic.com/michel-godard

Michel Godard (born October 3, 1960, Héricourt, France) is a French avant-garde jazz and classical musician. He plays tuba and the predecessor of the tuba, a brass instrument known as the serpent.

== Career ==
At 18, Godard was a member of the Philharmonic Orchestra of Radio-France. He has also been member of the French National Jazz Orchestra and the Arban Chamber Brass quintet, and has played with the Ensemble Musique Vivante, the ancient music Ensemble La Venice and "XVIII-21Musique de Lumieres".

Godard has participated in projects with Michel Portal, Louis Sclavis, Enrico Rava, Michael Riessler, Horace Tapscott, Christof Lauer, Kenny Wheeler, Ray Anderson, Rabih Abou-Khalil, Sylvie Courvoisier, Simon Nabatov, Samo Salamon, Linda Sharrock, Pierre Favre, Misha Mengelberg, Gianluigi Trovesi, Willem Breuker, Gabriele Mirabassi, the ARTE Quartett and more recently in a quartet with co-tubist Dave Bargeron.

His album Three Seasons (HGBS, 2014) with Günter "Baby" Sommer and Patrick Bebelaar) was awarded Album of the Year 2014 by The New York City Jazz Record. The album Stupor Mundi (DML, 2015) with Patrick Bebelaar, Vincent Klink, Gavino Murgia and Carlo Rizzo was awarded the German Record Critics' Award.

Godard has also played and recorded with the pipeband of the Brittany town Quimper, with reggae star Alpha Blondy, and with Canterbury rock musicians John Greaves and Pip Pyle.

As a composer, he has been commissioned by Radio France, Donaueschingen Music Festival, and the French Ministry of Cultural Affairs.

== Discography ==
- You Never Lose an Island (dml, 2002) with Patrick Bebelaar, Herbert Joos, Frank Kroll
- Point of View (dml, 2003) with Frank Kroll, Patrick Bebelaar, Prakash Maharaj, Subhash Maharaj, Vikash Maharaj
- Cousins Germains (CAM Jazz, 2005) with Christof Lauer, Wolfgang Pusching, Herbert Joos, Frank Tortiller, Wolfgang Reisinger
- Pantheon (dml, 2007) with Fried Dähn, Patrick Bebelaar, Herbert Joos, Frank Kroll, Carlo Rizzo
- Three Seasons (HGBS, 2014) with Günter Sommer and Patrick Bebelaar
- Stupor Mundi (dml, 2014) with Patrick Bebelaar, Gavino Murgia, Carlo Rizzo and Vincent Klink
- Awakening (Buda Musique, 2019) with Alim Qasimov

With CMC Ensemble

- Contra Puncta (Losen, 2018)

With Rabih Abou-Khalil

- The Sultan's Picnic (Enja, 1994)
- Arabian Waltz (Enja, 1996)
- Odd Times (Enja, 1997)
- The Cactus of Knowledge (Enja, 2001)
- Morton's Foot (Enja, 2003)
- Songs for Sad Women (Enja, 2007)
- Em Português (Enja, 2008)
- Trouble in Jerusalem (Enja, 2010)

With Pierre Favre

- Fleuve (ECM, 2005)

With Samo Salamon

- Nano (Goga, 2006)
- Fall Memories (Splasc(h) Records, 2007)
- Live! (Samo Records, 2009)
- Eleven Stories (Samo Records, 2012)
