= The Cactus of Knowledge =

Studio album by Rabih Abou-Khalil
- Released: 2001
- Recorded: July 22–30, 2000
- Studio: WDR Studio, Köln, Germany
- Genre: Jazz, world music
- Length: 66:16
- Label: Enja; ENJ 9401
- Producer: Rabih Abou-Khalil, Walter Quintus

Rabih Abou-Khalil chronology
Yara (1998)	The Cactus of Knowledge (2001)	Il Sospiro (2002)

The Cactus of Knowledge is an album by the Lebanese oud player and composer Rabih Abou-Khalil which was recorded in Germany in 2000 and released on the Enja label the following year.

== Reception ==
Professional ratings
Review scores
Source	Rating
Allmusic	4/5 stars

The Allmusic review by David R. Adler stated "Rabih Abou-Khalil's ninth Enja release features one of his most expansive lineups to date -- 12 pieces in all, including oud, brass, woodwinds, cello, and percussion. It's quite a departure from 1999's austere Yara. Here the tempos are bright, the unison lines darting and difficult, the improv heated, the tonal combinations ever-changing. Heavy-hitting jazzers dominate the band roster". In JazzTimes, Josef Woodard wrote "The masterful Lebanese oud player Rabih Abou-Kahlil-now living in Germany, where he is best known-has made it his business to combine elements of his native musical language with jazz, while weaving in rock and other ideas from American musical soil. His ongoing refinement process, not merely a continuation of past ideas, is amply evident on his ambitious new album, The Cactus of Knowledge".

== Track listing ==
All compositions by Rabih Abou-Khalil

1. "The Lewinsky March" – 5:25
2. "Business as Usual" – 6:23
3. "Fraises et Creme Fraiche" – 9:53
4. "Got to Go Home" – 8:51
5. "Oum Saïd" – 10:36
6. "Maltese Chicken Farm" – 9:36
7. "Ma Muse M'amuse" – 9:37
8. "Pont Neuf" – 5:41

== Personnel ==
- Rabih Abou-Khalil – oud, bass oud
- Dave Ballou – trumpet
- Eddie Allen – trumpet
- Tom Varner – French horn
- Dave Bargeron – euphonium
- Michel Godard – tuba
- Gabriele Mirabassi – clarinet
- Antonio Hart – alto saxophone
- Ellery Eskelin – tenor saxophone
- Vincent Courtois – cello
- Nabil Khaiat – frame drums
- Jarrod Cagwin – drums
