= Alexander Bălănescu =

Romanian violinist (born 1954)

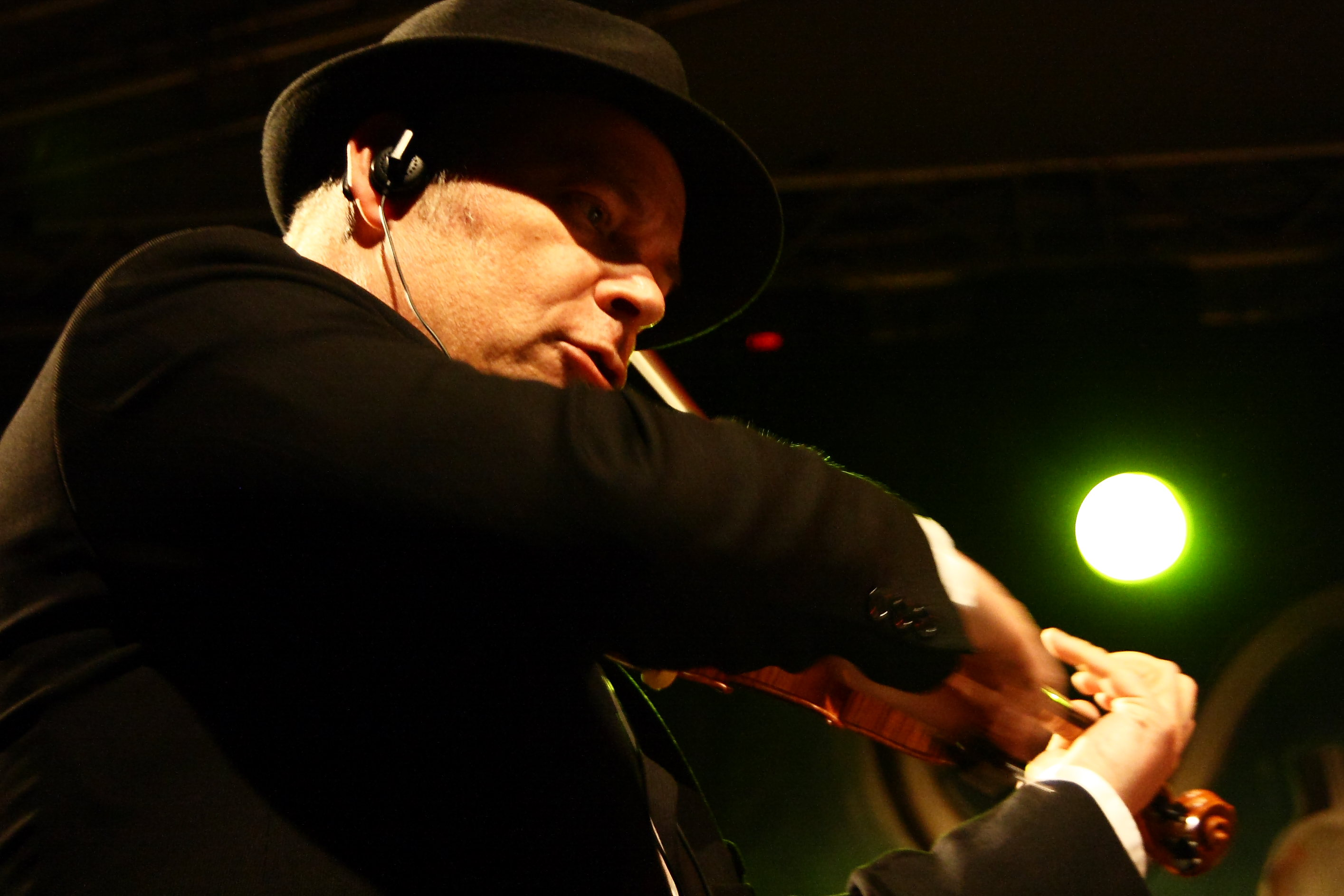
- Bălănescu at TFF Rudolstadt in 2013.

Background information
- Born: 11 June 1954 (age 72); Bucharest, Romania
- Instrument: Violin
- Website: www.balanescu.com

Alexander Bălănescu (Romanian pronunciation: [alekˈsander bələˈnesku]) (born 11 June 1954) is a Romanian violinist, and founder of the Balanescu Quartet.

== Biography ==
Bălănescu was born in Bucharest, and at the age of seven went to the Special School for Music there. His teachers in Romania were Dolly Koritzer, Garabet Avakian and Ștefan Gheorghiu. Of Jewish descent, he emigrated to Israel with his family when he was 14 years old. His studies continued at the Rubin Academy in Jerusalem with Iair Kless, London's Trinity College with Bela Katona, and from 1975-79 at the Juilliard School, New York with Dorothy DeLay, where he also took part in master classes with Pinchas Zukerman, Itzhak Perlman, Felix Galimir and Robert Mann.

In 1979 Bălănescu became leader of the Michael Nyman Band and toured with this group around the world for 15 years. During the same period he was also a member of the Gavin Bryars Ensemble.

Bălănescu was in the Arditti Quartet for four years before forming his own quartet in 1987. The Bălănescu Quartet has worked closely with Michael Nyman, Gavin Bryars, Kevin Volans, as well as musicians from varied musical fields such as John Lurie, David Byrne, Keith Tippett, Carla Bley, Rabih Abou Khalil, Spiritualized and the Pet Shop Boys. The dynamism of the quartet and its innovative approach to repertoire has led to performances on four continents in diverse venues, ranging from intimate clubs to stadiums.

Collaborations as composer/performer include, in dance, with Meryl Tankard, Pina Bausch, Rosemary Lee, Suzy Blok, Jochen Ulrich, Phillipe Saire and Virgilio Sieni, and in theatre productions at Theatre de la Place, Liege, Belgrade State Theatre, Cabaret Dromesko, Rennes, and Watford Palace Theatre. Bălănescu's credits as a composer of film and TV music include the feature films Angels & Insects (dir. Philip Haas), Le Poulpe (dir. Guillaume Nicloux), Il Partigiano Johnny (dir. Guido Chiesa), Eisenstein (dir. Renny Bartlett) and The Way I Spent the End of the World (dir. Cătălin Mitulescu) and over 20 animated films, the majority with his longstanding collaborator the director Phil Mulloy. In 2008 he wrote the music for the Hungarian film Tablo (dir. Gábor Dettre), performed by the Balanescu Quartet. 2009 saw a renewal of his collaboration with the director Philip Haas for the film installations Skeletons Warming themselves by the Fire and The Death of Pentheus commissioned by the Kimbell Art Museum, Fort Worth, Texas. The Death of Pentheus was also screened at the Venice Film Festival. He collaborated on 'On Day in May' with Vera Neubauer, a live performance that contemplated the sculptural and visceral beauty of the mayfly.

His increasingly strong links with his Romanian roots have been the catalyst for a collaboration with the singer and actress Ada Milea, resulting in the pieces The Island and God’s Playground.

Bălănescu was commissioned by Opera North to set a Shakespeare sonnet as part of the presentation of Shakespeare's complete works by the Royal Shakespeare Company in 2007. Also that year, Bălănescu was awarded the inaugural "Gopo" award for best original soundtrack for his work on The Way I Spent the End of the World. April 2007 saw the première by the Bruckner Orchestra under Ingo Metzmacher, of the full length ballet Lorenzaccio commissioned by the Landestheater, Linz, with choreography by Jochen Ulrich.

One can find recordings of Bălănescu's original work on his albums for Mute (Maria T, Possessed, Luminitza, Angels & Insects) as well as his tribute to the Yellow Magic Orchestra, East Meets East (Con-Sipio), his score for the Italian war film Il Partigiano Johnny (Virgin, Italy), collaborations with electronic artists, Lume, Lume (Staubgold), being featured on Carla Bley's Big Band Theory, as well as guesting on albums by Goldfrapp, Gianna Nanini, Malika, To Rococo Rot, Spiritualized, Rabih Abou Khalil, The Pet Shop Boys and Grace Jones. He has also documented on record his collaborations with the Russian accordionist Evelina Petrova, Upside Down (Leo records), as well as his quartet with the guitarist Maurizio Brounod, Claudio Cojanitz and Masimo Barbieri, Marmaduke (splasc(H)records) and Luigi Cinque's group Luna Reverse (EMI).

He is a performer of contemporary music and can be heard playing an arrangement of the University Challenge TV quiz programme intro and outro theme. He has also performed on many of Peter Greenaway's films including The Draughtsman's Contract and The Cook, the Thief, His Wife & Her Lover. Several short animated films by Phil Mulloy use his music.

He founded and leads the Balanescu Quartet and is a founding member of the Michael Nyman Band, performing on most of their albums, except between 1994 and 1998, as well as other ensembles playing Michael Nyman's music. He left the band during the recording of Facing Goya, and his concertmaster seat was assumed by Gabrielle Lester.

Balanescu has lived in London for over 40 years.

== Recordings ==
Solo:

- Alexander Bălănescu - Lume Lume (1991)
- Alexander Bălănescu - Il Partigiano Johnny (2005)

Group:

- Alexander Bălănescu & Jonathan Rees - Vivaldi: Les Quatre Saisons; Concertos pour 3 & 4 Violons (2008)
- Ada Milea & Alexander Bălănescu - The Island - featuring the Bălănescu Quartet (2011)

Featured:

- Michael Nyman - Drowning By Numbers - featuring Peter Greenaway, Alexander Bălănescu (1980s)
- Rabih Abou-Khalil - Arabian Waltz (Enja, 1996) - featuring the Bălănescu String Quartet
- Michael Nyman - And Do They Do/Zoo Caprices - featuring Alexander Bălănescu (1999)
- Muzsikás - The Bartók Album - featuring Márta Sebestyén and Alexander Bălănescu (1999)
- Erhard Grosskopf - Sound Pool: Adagio - featuring Alexander Bălănescu (2000)
- To Rocooco Rot & And I Sound - Music Is A Hungry Ghost - featuring Alexander Bălănescu (2001)
- Upside Down - with Evelina Petrova (2007)
