= Shoghaken Folk Ensemble =

The Shoghaken Folk Ensemble (Armenian: «Շողակն» ժողովրդական համույթ) is an Armenian musical group that performs and records Armenian folk and ashugh (troubadour) music. The ensemble was founded in 1991 in Yerevan. It has since performed in various countries, including France (including a 2006 performance at the Théâtre de la Ville in Paris), Germany, Estonia, Russia, and the United Arab Emirates. In the US, they performed at an eighteen-concert 2004 tour and at the 2002 Folklife Festival as part of the Silk Road project organized by Yo-Yo Ma. The ensemble was also featured on the soundtrack to the Atom Egoyan film Ararat. In 2008, Shoghaken gave concerts during their second major tour of the US and Canada; the tour coincided with the release of the ensemble's latest CD, Shoghaken Ensemble: Music From Armenia.

Among its founding members are sibling singers Hasmik Harutyunyan and Aleksan Harutyunyan, and duduk player Gevorg Dabaghyan. Its members play a variety of traditional Armenian instruments, including but not limited to the duduk, the pku, the zurna, the dhol, the kanon, the kamancha, and the shvi.

== Members ==
- Hasmik Harutyunyan: vocals
- Aleksan Harutyunyan: vocals
- Gevorg Dabaghyan: solo duduk, zurna
- Vardan Baghdasaryan: kamancha
- Karine Hovhannisyan: kanon
- Kamo Khachaturian: dhol
- Levon Tevanyan: shvi, tav shvi, blul, pku and parkapzuk
- Grigor Takushyan: dham duduk (drone)
- Tigran Ambaryan: kamancha
- Artur Arakelyan: ud
- Norayr Davtyan: kamancha

== Awards ==
- 2004: Best Folk Ensemble Album, Armenian Music Awards

== Discography ==
- 1995: Music of Armenia
- 2002: Armenia Anthology
- 2002: Gorani: Traditional Dances of the Armenian Homeland
- 2004: Traditional Dances of Armenia
- 2004: Armenian Lullabies
- 2008: Shoghaken Ensemble: Music From Armenia
