= Trouble in Jerusalem =

Studio album by Rabih Abou-Khalil
- Released: 2010
- Recorded: October 18–23, 2009
- Studio: Marktoberdorf, Germany
- Genre: Jazz, world music, contemporary classical music
- Length: 59:28
- Label: Enja; ENJ 9560
- Producer: Rabih Abou-Khalil, Walter Quintus

Rabih Abou-Khalil chronology
Em Português (2008)	Trouble in Jerusalem (2010)	Hungry People (2012)

Trouble in Jerusalem is an album by the Lebanese oud player and composer Rabih Abou-Khalil, conceived as a soundtrack to the 1922 German silent film Nathan the Wise, which was recorded in Germany in 2009 and released on the Enja label the following year.

== Reception ==
Professional ratings
Review scores
Source	Rating
The Guardian	3/5 stars

The Allmusic review by V. Vasan stated, "This album, unfortunately, is not so exciting and does not live up to its potential. Played by the German Youth Orchestra (BJO) along with composer Rabih Abou-Khalil on the oud and two other soloists, the music seems to neither move nor be adequately programmatic. ... overall, the music does not come alive due to the combination of the music itself (with a heavy use of unisons, even taking cultural differences into account) and an orchestra that is not experienced enough to give the music more shape. ... Trouble in Jerusalem just does not make for an inviting musical experience".

In The Guardian, John Fordham wrote, "Typical Abou-Khalil themes mingle European folk melodies and Arab rhythms, but, aside from the tail-chasing motifs on "Once Upon a Dervish" (which sounds like an Elmer Bernstein western score for a Middle-Eastern rhythm section), much of the ensemble music sounds portentous, and the composer's usual exuberant spontaneity, surrealism, and political wit seem overwhelmed by great-and-good obligations".

== Track listing ==
All compositions by Rabih Abou-Khalil

1. "Jerusalem" – 8:50
2. "Lament" – 10:24
3. "Jerusalemme Liberata" – 12:08
4. "Once Upon a Dervish" – 12:07
5. "Saladin and Nathan the Wise" – 7:29
6. "A Prayer for Tolerance" – 2:19

== Personnel ==
- Rabih Abou-Khalil – oud
- Michel Godard – tuba, serpent
- Jarrod Cagwin – frame drums
- The German Youth Orchestra conducted by Frank Strobel
  - Soloists:
  - Tobias Feldman – violin
  - Sarina Zikgraf – viola
  - Sophie Notte – cello
