= Time Before and Time After =

Studio album by Dominique Pifarély
- Released: August 28, 2015
- Recorded: September 2012 and February 2013
- Studios: Auditorium Saint-Germain, Poitiers and Cave Dimière, Argenteuil in France
- Genre: Jazz
- Length: 1:03:19
- Labels: ECM; ECM 2411
- Producer: Manfred Eicher

Dominique Pifarély chronology
| Time Geography (2014) | Time Before and Time After (2015) | Tracé provisoire (2016) |

Professional ratings
Review scores
| Source | Rating |
|---|---|
| All About Jazz | 4.5/5 stars |

Time Before and Time After is a solo album by French jazz violinist Dominique Pifarély recorded in September 2012 and February 2013 and released on ECM in August 2015.

== Composition ==
The album's name Time Before and Time After is from the T. S. Eliot's poem "Burnt Norton" and the tracklist is also an evocation of the work of many poets like Mahmoud Darwish, Fernando Pessoa, André du Bouchet, Henri Michaux, Paul Celan, Juan Gelman, and Bernard Noël.

== Track listing ==
All music is composed by Dominique Pifarély.

| No. | Title | Writer(s) | Length |
|---|---|---|---|
| 1. | "Sur terre" | | 7:34 |
| 2. | "Meu ser elástico" | | 5:54 |
| 3. | "L'air soudain" | | 7:28 |
| 4. | "D'une main distraite" | | 6:50 |
| 5. | "Avant le regard" | | 8:38 |
| 6. | "Gegenlicht" | | 11:10 |
| 7. | "Violin y otras cuestiones" | | 8:08 |
| 8. | "L'oubli" | | 3:36 |
| 9. | "My Foolish Heart" | Victor Young | 4:01 |
| Total length: | | | 1:03:19 |

== Personnel ==
- Dominique Pifarély – violin
