= Lullabies of Armenia =

The Armenian lullaby is significant for its historical, cultural, and linguistic aspect beyond its purpose of comfort and serving as a bridge to sleep. Influenced in part by their region of origin, Armenian lullabies are characterized by a lightness in melody and the rhythm of simple, repeated phrases that mimic the sound of the rocking cradle. Often, the lyrics also reflect the mother’s griefs and concerns.

== Regional variations ==
In Armenia there are hundreds of lullabies in the oral tradition, which originated in countless towns and villages across the Armenian high plateau. Historically these lullabies varied subtly between villages, towns, and regions. There are melodic and phrasing differences between lullabies from Van and Moush (in Western Armenia, traditionally the heart of the Armenian homeland) to Talish (near Yerevan) to Kessab (near the Mediterranean Sea, now in Syria) to Trebizond (on the coast of the Black Sea).

Listening quietly to an Armenian lullaby, one begins to discern the cadence of a word: oror, oror (rock, rock). Chanted over and over in almost every lullaby, the oror mimics the sound of the thing it represents, the to and fro of the cradle endlessly rocking. The word for "lullaby", or "rocking", can change from oror to heyroor in some regions, and in other regions, to nannik, loorik, nenni, roorik, or nana. Near Yerevan, in the Ararat plains, one can hear all of these versions, a hint at the speaker’s region of origin and social status.

== Themes ==
Most Armenian lullabies are traditional village lullabies, created and sung and passed down by village women. The content of many of the lullabies gives them the quality of a soliloquy, sung by women to themselves — domestic asides that reveal much about Armenian folklore and daily life. Many Armenian lullabies express yearning, disappointment, longing for a former lover or a husband who has emigrated, or the desire for personal or historical revenge, which are inculcated in the sleeping child.

In Armenian manuscripts, the nativity scene depicts Mary lying in a cave next to a wooden box holding the Christ child. Many believed an angel stood at the foot of the cradle, protecting the child from evil forces. Armenian lullabies often contain invocations to God, the Holy Mother and cross, Saint Sargis, Saint Karapet, and others. In the lullaby Taroni Oror (Lullaby of Taron; Taron is a region in eastern Anatolia including the towns of Moush and Sassoun), the mother sings "I tie a charm to your neck", likely part of a ritual protecting the infant from demons.

== Example in Armenian ==
«Օրօր Իմ Բալաս», traditional Armenian lullaby, as arranged by Parsegh Ganatchian (1885-1967)

Օրօր Իմ Բալաս	Oror im Pahlahs	Lullaby
Verse 1. Քուն եղի՛ր, բալաս, աչքերդ խուփ արա՛	Koon yeghir, pahlahs, atchkert khoop ahra	Go to sleep, my dear, close your eyes,
Նաշխուն աչքերուդ քուն թող գայ տեղայ:	Nashkhoon atchkeroot koon togh kah deghah	Let sleep rest upon your pretty eyes.
Chorus: Օրօր իմ բալաս, օրօր ու նանի	Oror im pahlahs, oror oo nahnee	Lullaby, my dear,
Իմ անուշիկիս քունը կը տանի:	Eem anoosheegees koonuh guh dahnee	Sleep takes my sweet one.
2. Դուն ալ քուն եղի՛ր, ինծի ալ քուն տու՛ր,	Toon al koon yegheer, eendzee al koon doohr,	Go to sleep now, and grant me sleep as well,
Սուրբ Աստուածամայր անուշիս քուն տու՛ր:	Soorp Asdvadzamayr anooshees koon doohr	Holy Mother, grant my sweet one sleep.
Repeat Chorus		

== Examples translated into English ==
Also remarkable are three lullabies from vastly different regions — Talish, Van, and Sassoun — in which the mother describes her child as being suckled by a deer:

With small leaves I will cover you
The wild deer will give you milk
But she has no heart
And will give you little milk
The sun is your father
The moon is your mother
And the tree is your cradle.

(From Talishi Oror (Lullaby of Talish), Armenian Lullabies, Hasmik Harutyunyan.)

The Armenian lullaby envelops shards of the folktale and myth. The dreamlike quality of these lullabies helps to create a mythical world and origin for the child. They are filled with natural elements personified — stars, the sun and moon as playmates and parents, and the wind rocking the child:

The south wind rocks you back and forth
Let the stars converse with you
And the sun and moon calm you
The wild deer will offer its milk
Sleep, sleep.

(From Nani Bala (Sleep, My Child), Armenian Lullabies, Hasmik Harutyunyan.)

Armenian lullabies of the modern era, from the Urban Folk genre, include Ari, Im Sokhak (Come, My Nightingale), Anush Knik (Sweet Sleep), and Nazei Oror (Lullaby of Naze), the latter telling of the horrors of the Armenian genocide:

The caravan passed
With a burden of tears
And in the black desert
Fell to its knees
Exhausted
Ah, with the pain of the world
Don’t cry
I have already shed many tears
My milk has frozen
On your lifeless lips
I know it is bitter
My child
And you don’t want it
Ah, my milk has become
The taste of my grief
Don’t cry
I have already shed many tears.

(From Nazei Oror (Lullaby of Naze), Armenian Lullabies, Hasmik Harutyunyan, lyrics by Avetis Aharonian.)
