= Martin Speake =

British saxophonist (born 1958)

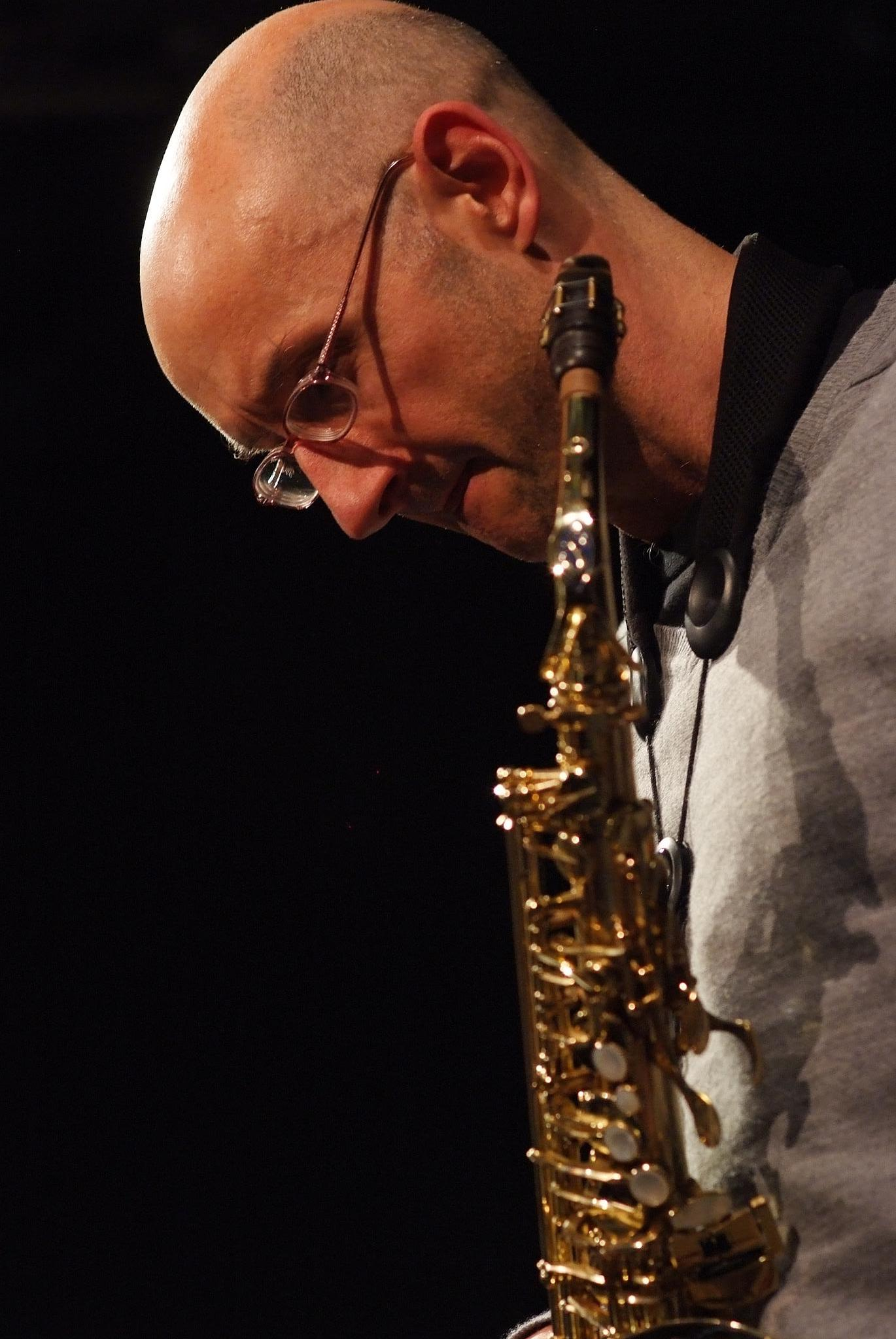
- Speake

Background information
- Born: Martin Speake; 1958 (age 67–68)
- Education: Trinity College of Music
- Genres: Jazz
- Occupations: Musician; Composer; Educator; Oral Historian; Nutritional Medicine
- Instrument: Alto saxophone
- Website: www.martinspeake.com

Martin Speake (born 1958) is a British saxophonist. He teaches at the Royal Academy of Music and at the Guildhall School of Music and Drama. He previously taught at Trinity Laban Conservatoire of Music and Dance in Greenwich. Speake has recorded eighteen albums as leader, including Change Of Heart (2006) with Paul Motian, Bobo Stenson and Mick Hutton.

== Career ==
Speake studied classical saxophone at Trinity College of Music. He joined saxophone quartet Itchy Fingers, touring Europe, South America, Africa and the USA. In 1986, the band won the Schlitz Young Jazz Musicians of the Year Award, which also aired on the BBC.

In 2018, Speake appeared at the London Jazz Festival at Cadogan Hall with Charukesi, his new project formed to reflect his interest in rhythmic music from around the world, drawing from Arabic, Indian and Turkish influences.

Also in 2018, he released Intention on Ubuntu Music, in quartet with Ethan Iverson. The Jazz Mann reviewed the album in April 2018, rating it 3.5 out of 5.

Speake performed a 2018 concert at PizzaExpress Jazz Club, London, which was subsequently broadcast on BBC Radio 3.

Among teaching positions that he holds, Speake is a visiting educator at London's Royal Academy of Music, and the Guildhall School of Music and Drama.

In 2024, Speake was the subject of controversy after an email he sent to a student criticizing Trinity's diversity, equity, and inclusion agenda was forwarded, leading to a student boycott of his classes and circulation of a student petition calling for his dismissal. Speake later took sick leave, and the college distanced itself from the views expressed by him in the email, which was said to undermine the African-American roots of jazz.

== Personal life ==
Speake LTCL is also a practising nutritional therapist, and holds a BSc in Nutritional Medicine. He runs a practice in Abbey Wood.

== Discography ==
=== As leader ===
- Quark with Itchy Fingers (Virgin, 1987)
- Teranga with Itchy Fingers (Pumpkin, 1988)
- In Our Time (Jazz Label, 1994)
- Amazing Grace (Spotlite, 1997)
- The Tan T Ien with Nikki Iles (FMR, 1998)
- Trust (33 Jazz, 1998)
- Secret with Nikki Iles (Basho, 2001)
- Exploring Standards (33 Jazz, 2003)
- The Journey (Black Box, 2004)
- My Ideal with Ethan Iverson (Basho, 2004)
- Charlie Parker (Jazzizit, 2005)
- Change Of Heart (ECM, 2006)
- Hullabaloo (Linn, 2007)
- Spark with Mark Sanders (Pumpkin, 2007)
- Generations (Pumpkin, 2008)
- Live at Riverhouse (Pumpkin, 2009)
- Two Not One with Colin Oxley (Pumpkin, 2010)
- Bloor Street with Secret Quartet (Edition, 2010)
- Strong Tea with Pavillon (Pavillon, 2011)
- Always a First Time (Pumpkin, 2013)
- Sound Clouds with Douglas Finch (Pumpkin, 2013)
- The Quiet Mind (Pumpkin, 2014)
- Duos for Trio (Pumpkin, 2017)
- Zephyr with Faith Brackenbury (Pumpkin, 2017)
- Intention (Ubuntu Music, 2018)
- Feathers (Pumpkin, 2019)

=== As sideman ===
- Barry Green, Introducing Barry Green (Tentoten, 2006)
- Billy Jenkins, Entertainment USA (Babel, 1994)
