= Christoph Irniger =

Swiss musician (born 1979)

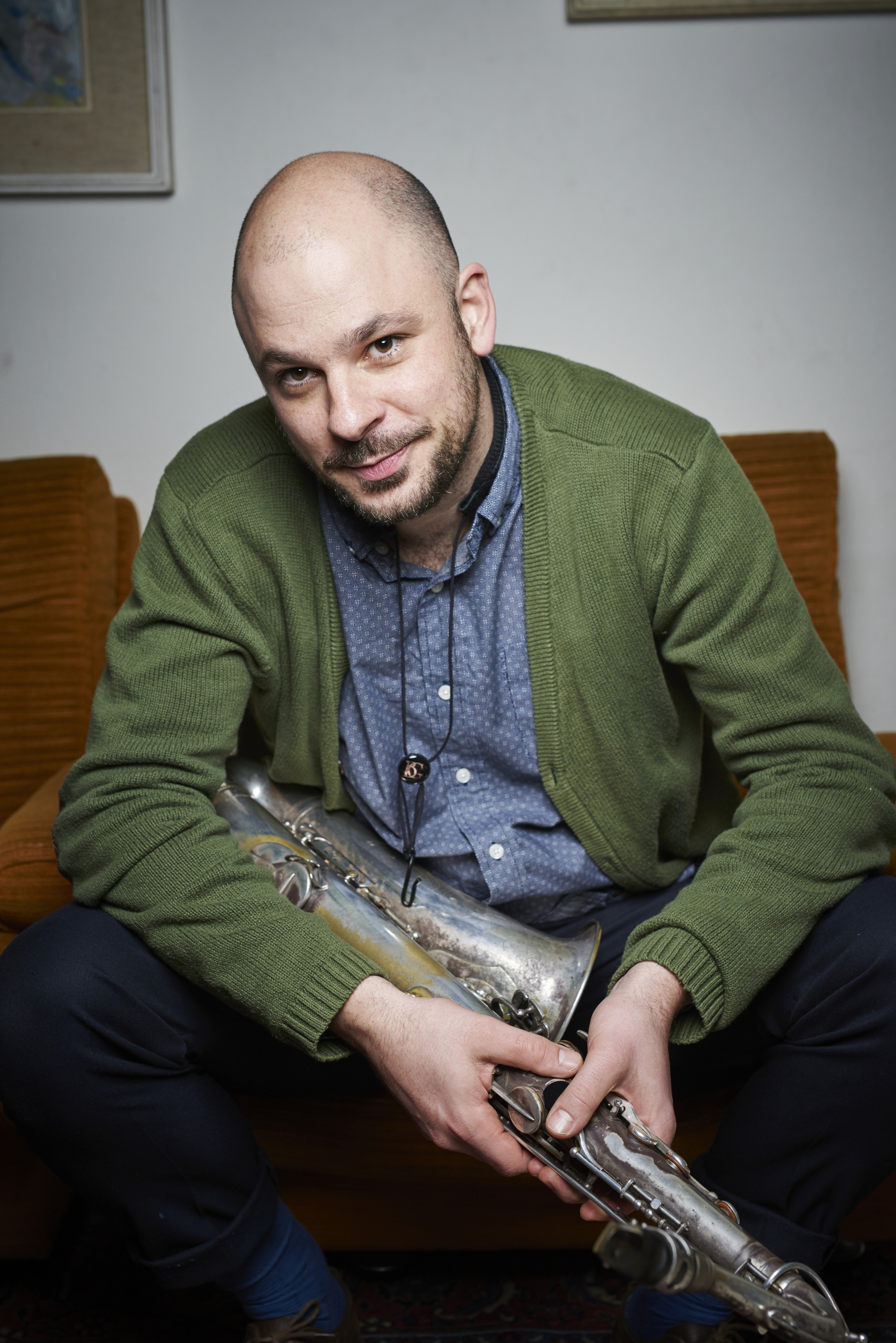
- Irniger in 2016

Background information
- Born: October 30, 1979; Zürich, Switzerland
- Genres: Jazz
- Occupations: Saxophonist, bandleader and composer
- Instrument: Saxophone
- Labels: Fresh Sound, Intakt Records, Brambus Records, Between The Lines
- Website: christophirniger.com

Christoph Irniger (born October 30, 1979) is a Swiss jazz saxophonist, bandleader and composer.

== Education ==
Christoph Irniger studied at Zurich University of the Arts Music Pedagogy and at the Lucerne University of Applied Sciences and Arts Performance Jazz with Christoph Grab and Nat Su between 2000 and 2006. In the following years he stayed regularly in Berlin and New York taking lessons with Dave Liebman, Mark Turner and Ari Hoenig.

== Career ==
Beside his own Trio and his band Pilgrim, which was selected for the three-years-programm high priority jazz promotion of Pro Helvetia during 2015 - 2017, Irniger was part of several other projects. From 2007 to 2014 he was part of the Lucerne Jazz Orchestra conducted by David Grottschreiber, where he played with, among others, Dave Douglas, Claudio Puntin and Matthias Spillmann. His visits to Berlin and New York have led to a number of diverse collaborations, including: Nasheet Waits (No Reduce), Ohad Talmor (Counterpoints) Michael Bates and Don Philippe. He did concerts and recordings with a.o. Nils Wogram, Hayden Chisholm, Max Frankl, Stefan Rusconi, Christian Weber, Chris Wiesendanger, Vera Kappeler, Jean-Paul Brodbeck and Peter Frei, as also the Reggae groups Dodo & the Liberators and GG & the Informers.

Irniger lives in Zürich and teaches saxophone at the music school Konservatorium Zürich since 2004. In 2011 he initiated the jazz series Jazz im Seefeld in Zürich and co-founded the Jazzwerkstatt in Zürich.

== Bandprojects ==
- Pilgrim (since 2009) with Stefan Aeby – piano; Dave Gisler – guitar; Raffaele Bossard – doubblebass; Michi Stulz – drums; Christoph Irniger, tenor saxophone
- Christoph Irniger Trio (since 2012) with Raffaele Bossard – doubblebass; Ziv Ravitz – drums; Christoph Irniger – tenor saxophone
- Cowboys From Hell (since 2005) with Marco Blöchlinger – bass; Chrigel Bosshard – drums; Christoph Irniger – tenor saxophone & electronics
- Noir (since 2012) with Don Philippe – guitar; Christoph Irniger – tenor saxophone
- Counterpoints (since 2012) with Ohad Talmor – tenor saxophone; Bänz Oester – doubblebass; Dan Weiss – drums; Christoph Irniger – tenor saxophone

== Discography ==
- 2008 Christoph Irniger Quartett Chat Noir (Brambus Records)
- 2008 Cowboys From Hell Monster Rodeo (Altrisuoni)
- 2010 R.I.S.S. Color&Style (Unit Records)
- 2011 Christoph Irniger Pilgrim Mt. Tongariro (Between The Lines)
- 2012 Cowboys From Hell Big Fish (Double Moon)
- Noir, Further Reductions (Contemplate, 2013)
- 2012 NoReduce Jaywalkin (nWog Records)
- Christoph Irniger Trio, Gowanus Canal (Intakt Records, 2013)
- Christoph Irniger Pilgrim, Italian Circus Story (Intakt Records, 2014)
- Christoph Irniger Trio, Octopus (Intakt Records, 2015)
- Christoph Irniger Pilgrim, Big Wheel Live (Intakt Records, 2016)
