= Yılmaz Arslan =

German film director, screenwriter and producer

Yılmaz Arslan (born 20 April 1968) is a German film director, screenwriter and producer of Turkish descent.

== Early life and education ==
Yilmaz Arslan was born on the Mediterranean coast in Kazanll, Turkey. In 1975, at the age of seven, he came to Germany. In 1978 he entered the rehabilitation center for children and adolescents in Neckargemünd. At school he founded the theatre group "Sommer Winter" which was invited to Berlin in 1989 with his play "Ohnmacht des Alltags" for the Theatertreffen der Jugend. In 1981 Arslan shot his first feature film "Langer Gang" at the Neckargemünder Reha-Zentrum.

== Career ==
In 1992, at the age of 24, he made his debut film, "Langer Gang", for which he subsequently won many awards. In his second film, Yara (1999) (Filmclub Award at the 1999 Max Ophüls Festival), he was writer and producer. His 2005 film Fratricide (Silver Leopard at the 2005 Locarno International Film Festival) was co-produced by Tarantula Luxembourg and sold in 26 countries. Besides his activities of producer, screenwriter and director, he taught cinema at Goethe Institut network in Europe. He is consultant for script-development of the Medien-und Filmgesellschaft Baden-Württemberg. In 2016, he founded the production company MaxMa Film GmbH.

== Filmography ==
- 1992: Langer Gang
- 1999: Yara
- 2002: Angst isst Seele auf (short film)
- 2005: Fratricide
- 2017: Sandstern
