= Luciano Biondini =

Italian jazz/folk accordion player

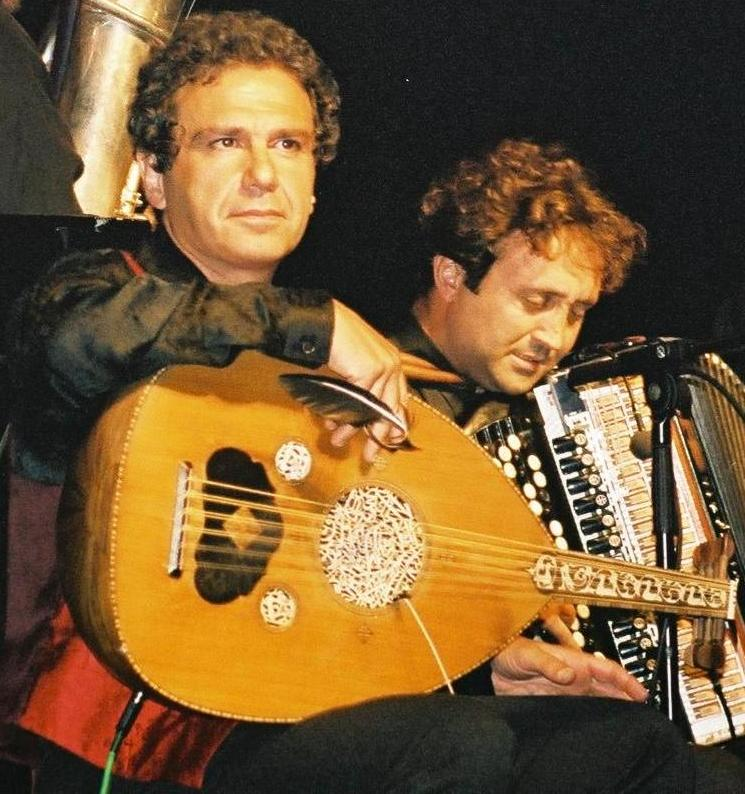
Cactus of Knowledge concert in Bonn, Germany, with Rabih Abou-Khalil.

Luciano Biondini is an Italian jazz and folk music accordion player who has appeared on the albums of various musicians, including Gabriele Mirabassi, Fratelli Mancuso, Ivano Fossati, Samo Šalamon and Rabih Abou-Khalil.

== Discography ==
As leader or co-leader

- Terra Madre, (Enja Records 2005) w/ Javier Girotto
- Prima Del Cuore, (Enja 2007)
- Biondini, Godard, Niggli - What Is There What Is Not (Intakt Records 2011)
- Face To Face (Abeat Records 2013) w/ Fabio Bosso
- La Strada Invisibile (ACT 2014) w/ Rita Marcotulli
- Senza Fine (Intakt Records 2015)
- Cinema Italia (Via Veneto Jazz 2016) w/ Rosario Giuliani, Enzo Pietropaoli, Michele Rabbia
