= Hasmik Harutyunyan =

Armenian folk singer (born 1960)

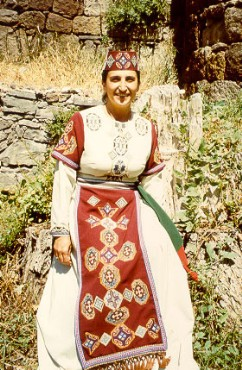

Background information
- Born: December 26, 1960 (age 65); Yerevan, Armenia

Hasmik Harutyunyan (Armenian: Հասմիկ Հարությունյան; born December 26, 1960, in Yerevan) is an Armenian folk singer. She is the leading member of the Shoghaken Folk Ensemble and directs the Hayrik Mouradian Traditional Song and Dance Children's Ensemble.

The music of the Shoghaken Ensemble is featured on the soundtrack of the film Ararat. Harutyunyan's Armenian Lullabies was recognized by the New York Times as an outstanding world music CD in 2004.

Before performing with the Shoghaken Ensemble, Harutyunyan performed as a soloist with the Agunk Ensemble (founded by Hayrik Mouradian) of Armenian National Radio in Armenia, Europe, and the Soviet Union. With Shoghaken, she has performed in Armenia, France (including a 2006 performance at the Théâtre de la Ville in Paris), Germany, Estonia, Russia, the United Arab Emirates, and the U.S. (including an eighteen-concert 2004 tour and an appearance at the 2002 Folklife Festival as part of the Silk Road project organized by Yo Yo Ma). In 2008, Shoghaken gave concerts during their second major tour of the US and Canada; the tour coincided with the release of the ensemble's latest CD, Shoghaken Ensemble: Music From Armenia. Harutyunyan has also recorded with the Ensemble Karot. In April 2009, Hasmik gave a concert of traditional Armenian lullabies at the Giving Voice festival in Wroclaw, Poland, as well as conducting workshops in Armenian folk singing and dancing. In autumn 2009, Hasmik performed in concerts in the US with the Kitka Women's Vocal Ensemble, presenting the music of Komitas, Hayrik Mouradian, and Armenian lullabies, as well as participating in the San Francisco World Music Festival. In 2010, she performed with Shoghaken and gave a workshop on Armenian folk song and dance in Ljubljana, Slovenia.

Harutyunyan graduated from the Yerevan State Pedagogical University and the Department of Vocal Music at the Arno Babajanian School of Music, majoring in opera.

== Discography ==
Shoghaken Folk Ensemble:

- 1995: Music of Armenia Volume V: Folk Music
- 2002: Armenia Anthology
- 2002: Gorani: Traditional Dances of the Armenian Homeland
- 2004: Traditional Dances of Armenia
- 2004: Armenian Lullabies
- 2008: Shoghaken Ensemble: Music from Armenia

Ensemble Karot:

- 2001: Ensemble Karot: Traditional Songs of Armenia (Volume I)
- 2003: Ensemble Karot: Traditional Songs of Armenia (Volume II)

Hayrik Mouradian Traditional Song and Dance Children's Ensemble:

- 2005: Traditional Children's Songs of Armenia

With Aleksan Harutyunyan:

- 2010: Wedding Songs of Armenia
- 2007: Horovel: Traditional Work Songs of Armenia
