= Blue Camel =

Studio album by Rabih Abou-Khalil
- Released: 1992
- Recorded: May 19–21, 1992
- Studios: Sound Studio N, Köln, Germany
- Genres: Jazz, world music
- Length: 60:59
- Labels: Enja; ENJ 7053
- Producer: Rabih Abou-Khalil

Rabih Abou-Khalil chronology
Al-Jadida (1991)	Blue Camel (1992)	Tarab (1993)

Blue Camel is an album by the Lebanese oud player and composer Rabih Abou-Khalil. The album fuses traditional Arabic music with jazz. It was recorded in 1992 and released on the Enja label.

== Reception ==
Professional ratings
Review scores
Source	Rating
AllMusic	4.5/5 stars

The AllMusic review by Kurt Keefner stated "Blue Camel is the pinnacle to date of Lebanese oud player Rabih Abou-Khalil's achievement as a jazzman. In both mood and scope, it can almost be characterized as a new Kind of Blue. Both tense and reflective, it is perfect for listening after midnight ... Blue Camel may not be a perfect album, but it demonstrates better than any other that a fusion between jazz and a musical form from another culture is possible and can work to the advantage of both. Plus, it's just great listening". Metal Reviews said "The album glories in crafting a successful blend of Arabian music and jazz: a very homogeneous and enjoyable fusion with enough shift in mood and method to keep things interesting".

== Track listing ==
All compositions by Rabih Abou-Khalil

1. "Sahara" – 8:18
2. "Tsarka" – 6:45
3. "Ziriab" – 6:49
4. "Blue Camel" – 8:20
5. "On Time" – 6:19
6. "A Night in the Mountains" – 8:37

== Personnel ==
- Rabih Abou-Khalil – oud
- Kenny Wheeler – flugelhorn, trumpet
- Charlie Mariano – alto saxophone
- Steve Swallow – bass
- Ramesh Shotham – South Indian drums, percussion
- Milton Cardona – congas
- Nabil Khaiat – frame drums
