= Gabriele Mirabassi =

Italian jazz clarinetist

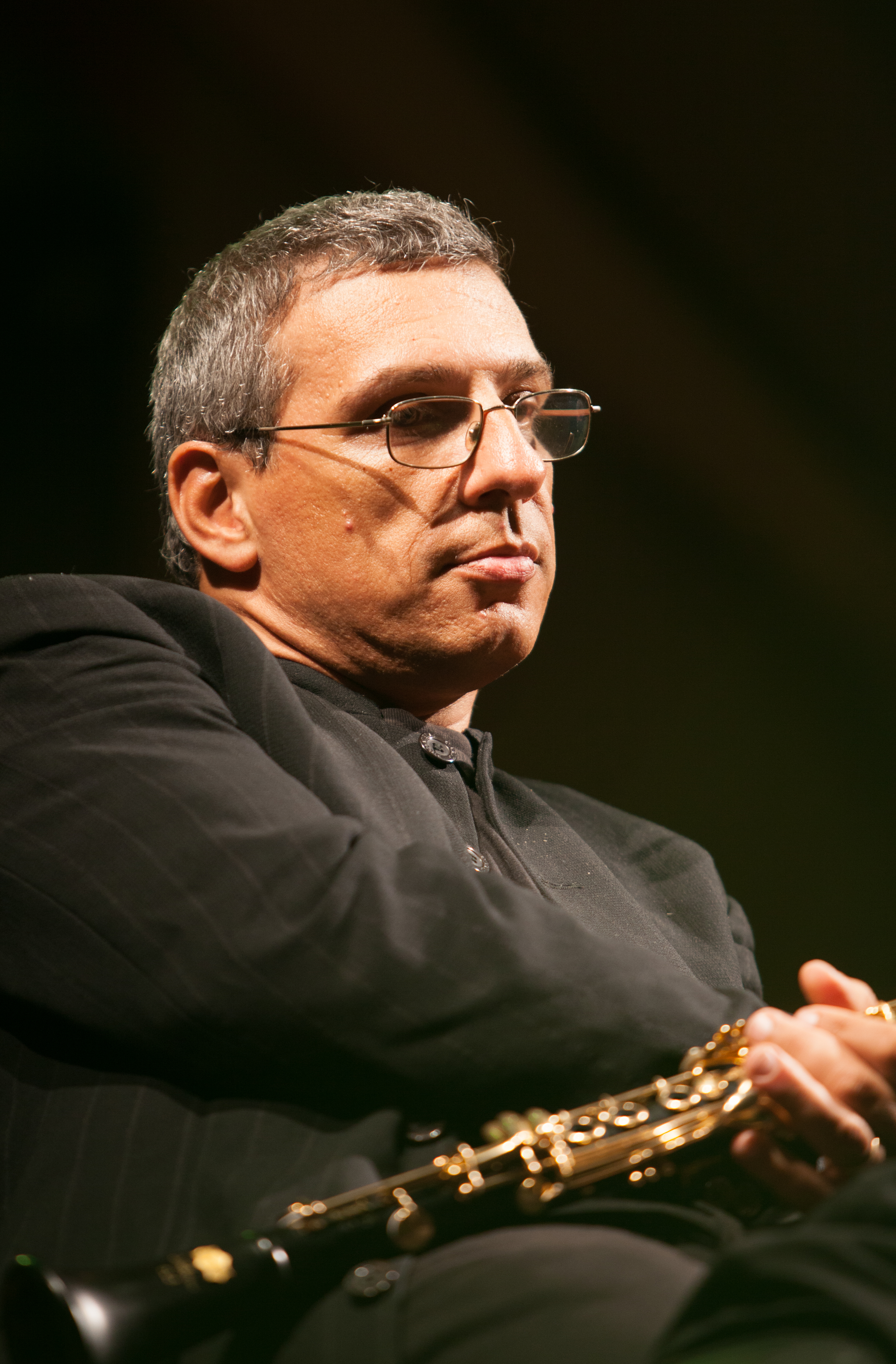
- Gabriele Mirabassi at the TFF Rudolstadt in 2013

Background information
- Born: Perugia, Italy
- Genres: Jazz, classical
- Occupation: Musician
- Instrument: Clarinet
- Years active: 1980s–present
- Label: Egea

Gabriele Mirabassi is an Italian jazz clarinetist.

== Career ==
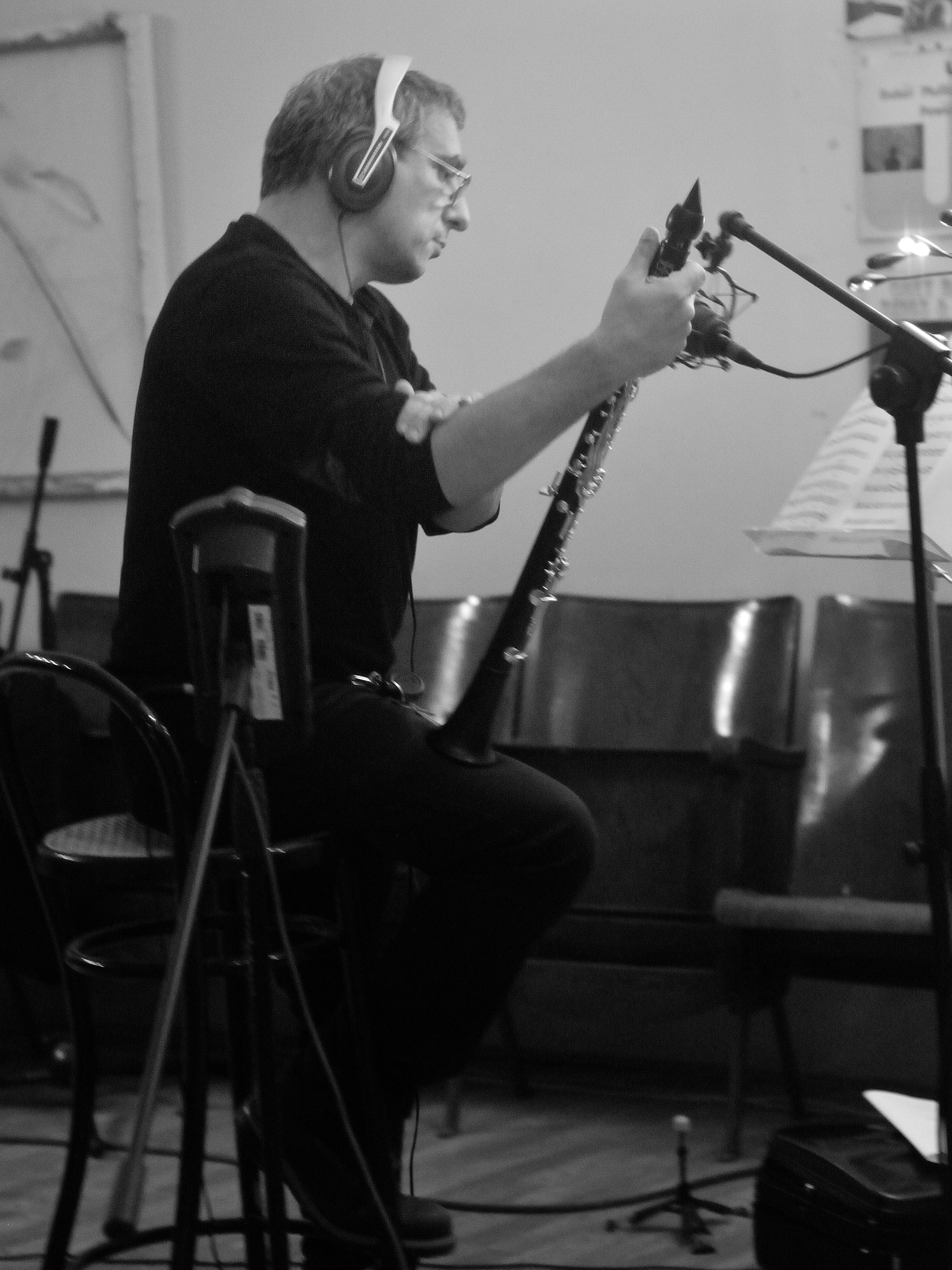
Gabriele Mirabassi in studio di registrazione, February 2015)

He was born in Perugia and is a graduate of the Morlacchi Conservatory. His teacher told him avoid playing jazz because it would damage his technique, so at home he learned jazz on the piano, playing along to his father's records. In his teens he performed locally on piano. He has been a member of the Rabih Abou-Khalil group. In 2013, he performed with harpist Edmar Castañeda at festivals in France and at a choro event in Brazil.

== Discography ==
- Fiabe (Egea, 1995)
- Cambaluc (Egea, 1997)
- Velho Retrato (Egea, 1999)
- Lo Stortino (Egea, 2000)
- Luna Park (Egea, 2000)
- 1–0 (Una a Zero) (Egea, 2001)
- Fuori le Mura, (Egea, 2003)
- Graffiando Vento (Dunya, 2007)
- Canto di Ebano (Egea, 2008)
- Chamber Songs (CAM Jazz, 2019)

With Rabih Abou-Khalil

- The Cactus of Knowledge (Enja, 2001)
- Morton's Foot (Enja, 2003)
