= Rabih Abou-Khalil =

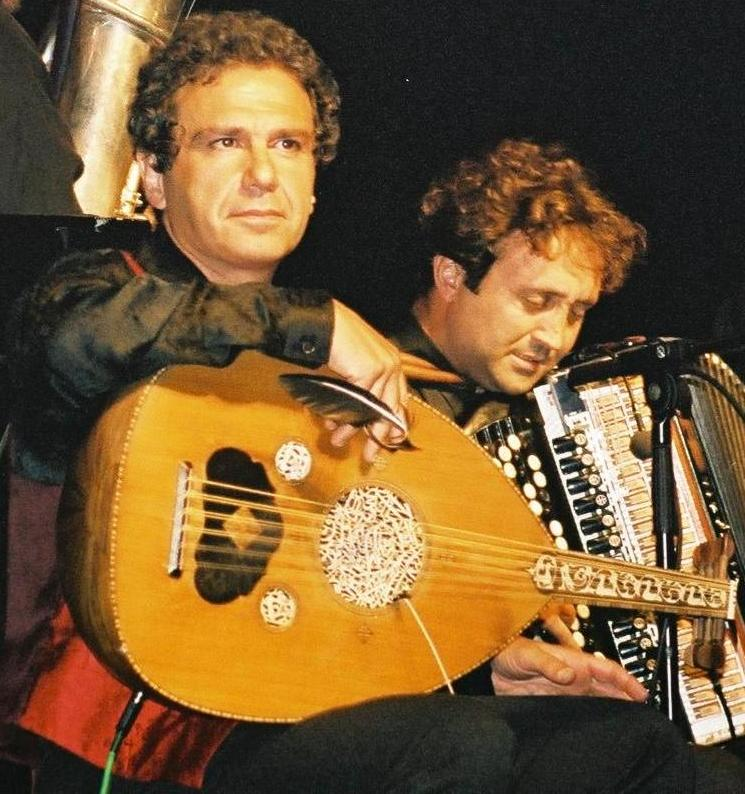
- Cactus of Knowledge concert in Bonn, Germany, with Luciano Biondini

Background information
- Born: August 17, 1957 (age 68); Beirut, Lebanon
- Genres: Ethno jazz, world fusion
- Occupations: Musician, composer, bandleader
- Instruments: Oud, flute
- Years active: 1980–present
- Labels: Enja, MMP, ECM

Rabih Abou-Khalil (Arabic: ربيع أبو خليل, born August 17, 1957) is an oud player and composer born in Lebanon, who combines elements of Arabic music with jazz, classical music, and other styles. He grew up in Beirut and moved to Munich, Germany, during the Lebanese Civil War in 1978.

== Musical style ==
Abou-Khalil studied the oud at the Beirut conservatory with oudist Georges Farah. After moving to Germany, he studied classical flute at the Academy of Music in Munich under Walther Theurer.

In his compositions and live concerts, he combines elements of Arabic music with jazz, rock, or classical music, and has earned praise as "a world musician years before the phrase became a label". — According to a review of his concert in The Guardian of 2002, Abou-Khalil "makes the hot, staccato Middle Eastern flavour and the seamless grooves of jazz mingle, as if they were always meant to."

In a review of his 2007 album Songs For Sad Women, the BBC wrote "the characteristic blend of jazz-inflected Arabic melody with subtle rhythms combines into a hypnotic whole, as ever with Abou-Khalil’s fluent oud playing in a central role."

Along with Tunisian oud virtuosos Anouar Brahem and Dhafer Youssef, he has helped establish the oud as an important instrument of Ethno jazz and world fusion.

Among other musicians, Abou-Khalil has worked with ARTE Quartett (saxophone quartet), Alexander Bălănescu (violin), Luciano Biondini (accordion), Milton Cardona (conga), Sonny Fortune (alto saxophone), Michel Godard (tuba and serpent), Joachim Kühn (piano, alto saxophone), Howard Levy (harmonica), Charlie Mariano (alto saxophone), Gabriele Mirabassi (clarinet), Glen Moore (bass), Mark Nauseef (percussion), Setrak Sarkissian (darabukka), Ramesh Shotham (Indian percussion), Steve Swallow (bass), Glen Velez (frame drum, percussion), or Kenny Wheeler (flugelhorn).

== Albums ==
His only album for the Munich-based label ECM was called Nafas (1988). Since 1990, his albums have been published by Enja Records, Munich. For Al-Jadida (1992), Abou-Khalil invited alto saxophonist Sonny Fortune; Blue Camel (1992), featured alto saxophonist Charlie Mariano and flugelhorn player Kenny Wheeler. Morton's Foot (2004) presents Luciano Biondini on accordion and Sardinian singer Gavino Murgia. Journey to the Centre of an Egg (2005) features a trio of oud, piano (Joachim Kühn, who doubles on alto saxophone) and Jarrod Cagwin on drums.

Nafas and Tarab make use of the ney, the Middle Eastern end-blown flute. Arabian Waltz features Abou-Khalil's compositions for string quartet (performed by the Balanescu Quartet), along with oud, Michel Godard on tuba or serpent, and frame drums.

In 2008, Abou-Khalil released an album entitled "Em Português" ("In Portuguese"), where he mixes fado with Arabic music with the participation of the fadista Ricardo Ribeiro.

== TV series: Visions of Music ==
In 1998, Rabih Abou-Khalil hosted the television series Visions of Music. This 13-part documentary series produced by EuroArts Entertainment set out to explore the blending of jazz with different music styles of the world (Caribbean salsa, Brazilian samba, Argentine tango, French musette, Spanish flamenco, Jewish klezmer, New Orleans R&B and Mississippi blues, as well as West African, South African, Indian, and Middle Eastern music) through historical footage and interviews with musicians by Abou-Khalil. The music of the TV-series was released on the album Visions of Music - World Jazz by Enja Records.

== Discography ==
- Compositions & Improvisations (MMP, 1981)
- Bitter Harvest (MMP, 1984)
- Between Dusk and Dawn (MMP, 1987; Enja, 1993)
- Bukra (MMP, 1988; Enja, 1994)
- Nafas (ECM, 1988)
- Roots & Sprouts (MMP/Enja, 1990)
- World Music Orchestra: East West Suite (Granit, 1990)
- Al-Jadida (Enja, 1991)
- Blue Camel (Enja, 1992)
- Tarab (Enja, 1993)
- The Sultan's Picnic (Enja, 1994)
- Arabian Waltz (Enja, 1996)
- Odd Times (Enja, 1997)
- Yara (Enja, 1998)
- The Cactus of Knowledge (Enja, 2001)
- Il Sospiro (Enja, 2002)
- Morton's Foot (Enja, 2003)
- Journey to the Centre of an Egg (Enja, 2005)
- Songs for Sad Women (Enja, 2007)
- Em Português (Enja, 2008)
- Trouble in Jerusalem (Enja, 2010)
- Hungry People (World Village, 2012)
- The Flood and the Fate of the Fish, (Enja Records, 2020)

=== As guest musician ===
- Chris Karrer: Dervish Kish (Schneeball/Indigo, 1990/91)
- Michael Riessler: Heloise (Wergo, 1992)
- Charlie Mariano & Friends: Seventy (veraBra records, 1993)
- Glen Moore: Nude Bass Ascending (Intuition, 1996/97)
- Ramesh Shotam: Madras Special (Permission Music, 2002)

=== Other ===
- Jakob Wertheim & Rabih Abou-Khalil: KopfKino cassette (Ohrbuch-Verlag, 1988)
- The Jazz Club Highlights DVD (TDK JAZZ CLUB, 1990)
- Rabih Abou-Khalil presents Visions of Music - World Jazz accompanying TV series (Enja, 1999)
