= Ray Anderson (musician) =

American jazz trombonist (born 1952)

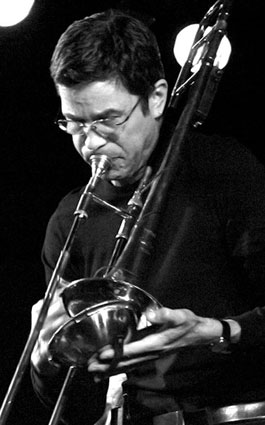

Background information
- Born: October 16, 1952 (age 73); Chicago, Illinois, U.S.
- Genre: Jazz
- Occupation: Musician
- Instruments: Trombone, jazz trumpet, vocals
- Years active: 1973–present
- Label: Enja
- Formerly of: Barry Altschul Trio, BassDrumBone, Bobby Previte & Bump, David Murray Quintet, Fool Proof, George Russell's New York Band, Gerry Hemingway Quartet, Gerry Hemingway Quintet, Greg Alper Band, Henry Threadgill Sextett, Hidden Strength, Leo Smith Creative Orchestra, Liberation Music Orchestra, Marty Ehrlich Large Ensemble, New York Jazz Collective, Oahspe, Ray Anderson Alligatory Band, Ray Anderson Lapis Lazuli Band, Ray Anderson Pocket Brass Band, Ray Anderson Quartet
- Website: www.rayanderson.org

Ray Anderson (born October 16, 1952) is an American jazz trombonist.

== Background ==
Trained by the Chicago Symphony trombonists, he is regarded as someone who pushes the limits of the instrument, including performing on alto and soprano trombone. He is a colleague of trombonist George E. Lewis. Anderson also plays sousaphone (marching tuba) and sings. He was frequently chosen in DownBeat magazine's Critics Poll as best trombonist throughout the late 1980s and early 1990s.

Anderson has worked with David Murray, Charlie Haden's Liberation Music Orchestra, Dr. John, Luther Allison, Bennie Wallace, Gerry Hemingway, Henry Threadgill, John Scofield, Roscoe Mitchell, Randy Sandke's Inside Out Band, Sam Rivers' Rivbea Orchestra, Bobby Previte, George Russell and others. Anderson is a member of Jim Pugh's Super Trombone with Dave Bargeron and Dave Taylor. He received a grant from the National Endowment for the Arts for a series of solo trombone concerts.

Anderson has frequently returned to his early love of New Orleans music for inspiration. His Alligatory Band and Pocket Brass Band, featuring tuba player Bob Stewart or sousaphonist Matt Perrine and trumpeter Lew Soloff, are rooted in its tradition. Since 2003 he has taught and conducted at Stony Brook University.

== Career ==
After studying in California, he moved to New York in 1972 and freelanced. By 1975, he was a playing trombone as a member of the group Hidden Strength, which also included Roy Herring Jr. on vocals, Grover Underwood on keyboards, Ken Sullivan on keyboards, Robert Leach on saxophone, Alvin Brown on bass and Al Thomas on drums. They had a hit with "Hustle on Up (Do the Bump)" which made it to No. 35 on the Billboard Hot Soul Singles chart, and No. 27 on the Cash Box Top 100 R&B chart. Their album also made the Billboard and Cash Box charts. They also had a hit with "I Don't Want to Be a Lone Ranger".

In 1977, he joined Anthony Braxton's Quartet (replacing George E. Lewis) and started working with Barry Altschul's group. He has led his own groups since the late 1970s including the funk-oriented Slickaphonics, in which he began taking an occasional good-humored vocal, where he shows the ability to sing two notes at the same time (a minor third apart). Anderson has worked with George Gruntz's Concert Jazz Band.

== Discography ==
=== As leader/co-leader ===
- Harrisburg Half Life (Moers Music, 1980)
- Right Down Your Alley (Soul Note, 1984)
- Old Bottles - New Wine (Enja, 1985)
- It Just So Happens (Enja, 1987)
- Blues Bred in the Bone (Enja, 1988)
- What Because (Gramavision, 1989)
- Wishbone (Gramavision, 1991)
- Every One of Us (Gramavision, 1992)
- Big Band Record (Gramavision, 1994)
- Azurety (hatART, 1994) with Han Bennink and Christy Doran
- Don't Mow Your Lawn (Enja, 1994) with the Alligatory Band
- Slideride (hat ART, 1994) with Craig Harris, George E. Lewis and Gary Valente
- Cheer Up (hatArt, 1995) with Han Bennink and Christy Doran
- Where Home Is (Enja, 1998)
- Bonemeal (Raybone, 2000)
- Ibrahim Electric Meets Ray Anderson (Sundance, 2005)
- Sweet Chicago Suite (2012)

With BassDrumBone

- Wooferlo (Soul Note, 1989)
- Hence the Reason (Enja, 1997)
- Cooked to Perfection (Auricle, 1999)
- March of Dimes (Data, 2002)
- The Line Up (Clean Feed, 2006)
- The Other Parade (Clean Feed, 2011)
- The Long Road (Auricle, 2016)

With Slickaphonics

- Wow Bag (Enja, 1982)
- Modern Life (Enja, 1984)
- Humatomic Energy (Blue Heron, 1985)
- Check Your Head at the Door (Teldec, 1986)
- Live (Teldec, 1987)

=== As sideman ===
With Barry Altschul

- Another Time/Another Place (Muse, 1978)
- Somewhere Else (Moers Music, 1979)
- Brahma (Sackville, 1980)
- For Stu (Soul Note, 1981)

With Anthony Braxton

- Creative Orchestra (Köln) 1978 (hatART, 1995)
- Performance (Quartet) 1979 (hatART, 1981)
- Seven Compositions 1978 (Moers Music, 1979)
- Composition No. 94 for Three Instrumentalists (1980) (Golden Years of Jazz, 1999)
- Composition 98 (hatART, 1981)

With Charlie Haden

- The Montreal Tapes: Liberation Music Orchestra (rec. 1989, Verve, 1999)
- Dream Keeper (DownBeat's Jazz album of the year)

With Julius Hemphill

- The Boyé Multi-National Crusade for Harmony (New World, 2021)

With Roscoe Mitchell

- Sketches from Bamboo (Moers Music, 1979)

With Lucky Peterson

- Triple Play (Alligator, 1990)

With Bobby Previte & Bump

- Just Add Water (Palmetto, 2001)

With Sam Rivers' Rivbea All-star Orchestra

- Inspiration (BMG France, 1999)
- Culmination (BMG France, 1999)

With Hank Roberts

- Black Pastels (JMT, 1988)

With George Russell's New York Band

- Live in an American Time Spiral (Soul Note, 1983)

With Bob Thiele Collective

- Lion Hearted (1993)

With Roseanna Vitro and Kenny Werner

- The Delirium Blues Project: Serve or Suffer (2008)
