= The Daisy Dillman Band =

- Origin: United States
- Genres: Country rock
- Years active: 1970s –
- Labels: United Artists, RCA Victor
- Past members: Dan Flaherty; Pat Frederick; Steve Seamans; Steve Solmonson; Michael Wolf
- Website: https://www.daisydillman.com/

The Daisy Dillman Band aka The Dillman Band was an American country rock band who were active in the 1970s and 1980s. They released three singles and had album releases on two major American labels. They had charting hits with "Lovin' the Night Away" and "Love Don't Run". After breaking up, the group reformed and was performing into the 2020s.

== Background ==
The group released their self-titled debut album on the United Artists Records label in 1978. In 1981, their second album, Lovin' the Night Away was released. Their single "Lovin' the Night Away" was a hit and made the Billboard Hot 100.

During their active period from the late 1970s to early 1980s, they opened for acts that include, Alabama, Bonnie Raitt, Asleep at the Wheel and Lynyrd Skynyrd. Other acts that they have performed with include, Jerry Jeff Walker, the Amazing Rhythm Aces and the Ozark Mountain Daredevils.

In 2006, the group was inducted into the Minnesota Rock & Country Hall of Fame.

== Career ==
=== 1970s - 1980s ===
The group released their single, "Border Bound". It was produced by Bob Skaff. Backed with " Flyin' Solo", it was released on United Artists UA-XW1128. It was reviewed in the 21 January 1978 issue of Record World. The reviewer wrote that with the Eagles leaning and southwestern feeling, it should prove to be popular. According to the 6 March 1978 issue of Walrus!, the single was doing well in the Midwest where it made the Top 15 on a couple of retail lists. It was also getting heavy airplay at KSFM in Woodland.

==== Debut album ====
The group's self-titled album was released on United Artists UA LA 838. It debuted at No. 199 in the Record World 151-200 album chart for the week of 18 February 1978. For the week of 11 March the album was at No. 154. The following week it debuted at No. 144 in the 101-150 Album Chart. The album reached its peak position of 136 for the week of 1 April. It held that position until the week of 15 April.

It also saw some air-action in Canada. It was shown in the 15 April issue of RPM Weekly that it was playlisted at CFFM-FM .

==== Further activities ====
It was reported in the 24 August 1978 issue of the Stoutonia that the Daisy Dillman band were performing on the 31st of that month in a free concert that was sponsored by the Pop Concert-Dance Commission. The band played to 1500 students in a concert that lasted three hours.

The group released their single, "Lovin' the Night Away" in 1981. It debuted on the Billboard Hot 100 Singles chart for the week of 9 May. It peaked at No. 45 on the Hot 100 for the week of 20 June during its nine-week run. It also made it to No. 36 on the Billboard Adult Contemporary chart and No. 59 on the Cash Box Singles chart.

The group's single "Love Don't Run" was also released in 1981. It was a Single Pick in the 15 August issue of Record World. The review was positive with the reviewer mentioning the merit of the harmony / lead vocals by Steve Seamans and Patrick Fredrick. The reviewer also wrote that the hook and arrangement would win the ears of pop and A/C listeners. It was also reviewed in the 15 August issue of Cash Box. The review was positive with the reviewer finishing off with calling it "Pop powerhouse". It debuted at No. 126 on the Record World 101-150 Singles chart for the week of 12 September.

=== 2000s - 2020s ===
The group was booked to play at the Zumbrota State Theater on 2 November 2013. At the time the lineup was made up of Rick Leibold, Pat Frederick, Feagan Solmonson, Stymie Seamans, and keyboardist Craig Anderson.

==== Reunion ====
It was reported by CBS News on 20 December 2014 that the group were getting back together after a three-decade absence. Prior to that they had only performed some one-off concerts. The line up included four of the original band members. In January 2015, their ten-track CD of original material was set for release. The title of was Radio.

The group reunited in January 2015 and released their CD Radio and played to a full concert in Hopkins. In September that year, they were booked to play at the Parkway Theater in Minneapolis.

==== Further activities ====
It was reported in the 4 June 2018 issue of the Post Bulletin that three of the founding members, Pat Frederick, Steve Solmonson and Steve Seamans played at Crossings at Carnegie, 320 East Ave., Zumbrota in June 2018.

The group was booked to play at the Chanhassen Dinner Theatre on 25 and 26 June 2021. The performance, dedicated to Crosby, Stills, Nash and Young included the songs, "Carry On", "Teach Your Children", "Long Time Gone", "Our House" and "Woodstock".

== Line-up ==
=== 2005 ===
- Steven Solmonson "Feagan" - guitar
- Michael C. Wolf - keyboards
- Stephen William Seamans "Stymie" - bass and peddle steel
- Pat Frederick - violin
- Danny Flaherty - drums

== Discography ==
Singles
Act	Release	Catalogue	Year	Notes
The Daisy Dillman Band	"Border Bound" / "Border Bound"	United Artists UA-XW1128	1978	
The Dillman Band	"Lovin' the Night Away" / "C.O.D."	RCA PB-12206	1981	
The Dillman Band	"Love Don't Run" / "She's Just a Stranger"	RCA PB-12278	1981	

Albums
Act	Release	Catalogue	Year	Notes
The Daisy Dillman Band	The Daisy Dillman Band	United Artists Records UA LA838-G	1978	
The Dillman Band	Lovin' the Night Away	RCA Victor AFL1-3909	1981	
The Daisy Dillman Band	Radio		2015	
