= Hidden Strength =

- Origin: United States
- Genres: Disco, Funk
- Years active: 1970s
- Labels: United Artists, Vision Records, Soul Brother Records
- Past members: Ray Anderson; Alvin Brown; Roy Herring; Robert Leach; Ken Sullivan; Al Thomas; Grover Underwood

Hidden Strength was a disco funk band that was active during the mid 1970s period. They had hits with "Hustle on Up (Do the Bump)" and "I Don't Want to Be a Lone Ranger".

== Background ==
The group Hidden Strength was discovered by Bob Skaff. They were made up of Roy Herring on vocals, Grover Underwood on keyboards, Ken Sullivan on keyboards, Ray Anderson on trombone, Robert Leach on saxophone, Alvin Brown on bass and Al Thomas on drums.

The group's live sound was described by Billboard as something between Jimi Hendrix and Sly & the Family Stone. According to the Funk My Soul website, their recordings are in the Earth Wind & Fire mode.

Hidden Strength was managed by Jimmy Walsh and Namanco productions who handled Joe Namath's career. Namanco was started in 1969.

== Career ==
The group opened for Ike and Tina Turner on New Years Eve 1974 at the NFE Theater (formerly the Fillmore East venue). According to New York Times reviewer John Rockwell, their performance was quite good and full of energy and catchy precision. They were followed by Quicksilver Messenger Service. The performance was also reviewed by Radcliffe Joe in the 25 January issue of Billboard. Joe wrote that the band was ambitious, energetic and hard working. The music in the performance was described as often appealing and inoffensive but not overly imaginative.

On 11 July 1975, the group appeared at the Wollman Rink in New York. The main attractions for the event were Stanley Turrentine and Gil Scott-Heron. Hidden Strength's performance was reviewed by Fobert Ford Jr. and published in the 2 August issue of Billboard. Ford referred to Roy Herring Jr. as a powerful lead singer who has a "dynamic, virile stage presence and strong voice". He wrote that Alvin Brown's bass work was outstanding, adventurous and funky, and electric pianist and composer Grover Underwood's composition work with Herring was impressive. He also wrote that the group with their energetic funk had no trouble reaching an audience that had come to hear traditional jazz. The up-tempo disco song "Hustle on Up" was referred to as standing out.

It was reported in the 4 October 1975 issue of Billboard that studio owner George Klabin was working with producer Mike Cuscuna remixing the upcoming Hidden Strength LP album. The album had a positive review in the 17 January 1976 issue of Cash Box. It also had a positive review in the 28 January issue of Walrus. It made it to No. 45 in the Cash Box Top 50 R&B albums chart and No. 50 in the Billboard Soul LPs chart. It even made the Record World Jazz Lp chart, where it was at No. 40 for the week of 20 March 1976.

One song from their album, "I Wanna Be Your Main Man" had been getting some airplay on progressive jazz programs in early February.

=== Debut single ===
The group released their single "Hustle on Up (Do the Bump)". It was a five-star Pick of the Week single and reviewed in the 7 February 1976 issue of Cash Box. The reviewer wrote that it was the "hottest disco sounds to reach these ears in quite a while". The review in the 27 February issue of Billboard was just as positive. Over in the UK, James Hamilton's review in the 3 April issue of Record Mirror & Disc was luke warm and called it useful if unspectacular disco fodder. The record had a thirteen-week run in the Billboard Hot Soul Singles chart, peaking at No. 35. It also did well in the Cash Box Top 100 R&B chart, where was in the chart for sixteen weeks, peaking at No. 27 for the week of 5 June.

=== Further activities ===
John Abbey from the Blues & Soul magazine did an exposé on the group, which was published in the magazine's 13 July 1976 issue. He wrote that they were destined for big things in the future.

The group recorded their version of Johnny "Guitar" Watson's "I Don't Want to Be a Lone Ranger". It peaked at No. 78 on the Billboard Hot Soul Singles chart for the week of 16 October and held that position for an additional week. It peaked at No. 74 on the Cash Box Top 100 R&B chart for the week of 9 October. It was still at the same position for the week of 16 October.

A single "You're No. 1", credited to Hidden Strength was released on Vision VR004 in 1985.

== Later years ==
Grover Underwood played keyboards on the Brother 2 Brother album, Shades in Creation that was released in 1977.

Robert Leach aka Bobby Leach played on the Ready for Anything album by Richard "Dimples" Fields that was released in 1977. He would later release his own album, Phat Grooves.

Roy Herring sang background on the Heavy Metal Be-Bop album by the Brecker Brothers that was released in 1978. Later he was to become the lead singer of the group Speedway Blvd., singing on their single, "(Think I Better) Hold On" and their self-titled album, both released in 1980. He later had releases under the name of Mr. Roy. He also released a single, "Witchcraft" which was available online.

Trombonist Ray Anderson played on recordings by artists that include, Anthony Braxton, David Murray, Charlie Haden’s Liberation Music Orchestra, Dr. John, the George Gruntz Concert Jazz Band, Luther Allison, Bennie Wallace, Henry Threadgill, Barbara Dennerlein, John Scofield, Roscoe Mitchell, the New York Composers Orchestra, and the Sam Rivers' Rivbea Orchestra. He is also the Director of Jazz Studies at Stony Brook University, a position he has held since 2003.

The Funk My Soul website refers to their 1975 album release as a classic funk album which would appeal those who were into the style of Brass Construction and BT Express.

== Discography ==
Singles
| Act | Release | Catalogue | Year |
|---|---|---|---|
| Hidden Strength | "Hustle on Up (Do the Bump)" / "Hustle on Up (Do the Bump)" (Instrumental) | United Artists Records – UA-XW733-Y | 1975 |
| Hidden Strength | "I Don't Want to Be a Lone Ranger" / "Happy Song" | United Artists Records UA-XW847-Y | 1976 |
| Hidden Strength | "You're No. 1" / "You're No. 1" | Vision Records VR004 | 1985 |
| Hidden Strength | "I Don't Want to Be a Lone Ranger" / Hustle on Up (Do the Bump)" | Soul Brother Records 12-SBT-11 | 2002 |

Album
| Act | Release | Catalogue | Year | Notes |
|---|---|---|---|---|
| Hidden Strength | Hidden Strength | United Artists Records UA-LA555-G | 1975 | |
