= You Can Always Turn Around =

Studio album by Lucky Peterson
- Released: September 28, 2010
- Recorded: March 2010 in Woodstock, NY
- Genre: Blues
- Length: 56:34
- Label: Dreyfus
- Producer: Doug Yoel, Francis Dreyfus, Lucky Peterson

You Can Always Turn Around is a studio album by the American musician Lucky Peterson, released in 2010. It won the Grand Prix du Disque award the same year for the best blues album.

== Reception ==
Professional ratings
Review scores
Source	Rating
AllMusic	3.5/5 stars
DownBeat	4/5 stars

Frank-John Hadley of DownBeat wrote, "He’s never before, in the studio at least, sang with such believable expression and easeful authority over varying the timbre of his strong, rich voice. On good or excellent material selected for him by album co-producer Doug Yoel, Peterson plays guitar, dobro and gospel piano (no B-3 this time) as if he’d found his true focus after so many years".

AllMusic's J. Poet observed, "Lucky Peterson shows off his instrumental versatility on this mostly acoustic set by switching between piano, Duolian resonator guitar, and electric guitar. Vocally he's still at the top of his game and shows plenty of fire and versatility on this set by mixing renditions of blues and gospel classics".

== Track listing ==
No.	Title	Length
1.	"I Believe I'll Dust My Broom (Robert Johnson)"	5:04
2.	"I'm New Here (Bill Callahan)"	3:16
3.	"Statesboro Blues (Blind Willie McTell)"	4:45
4.	"Trouble (Ray LaMontagne)"	6:54
5.	"Trampled Rose (Tom Waits, Katleen Brennan)"	4:57
6.	"Atonement (Lucinda Williams)"	6:31
7.	"Why Are People Like That (Bobby Charles)"	4:27
8.	"Four Little Boys (Lucky Peterson, James Peterson)"	5:35
9.	"Death Don't Have No Mercy (Reverend Gary Davis)"	5:38
10.	"I Wish I Knew How It Would Feel to Be Free (Billy Taylor, Dick Dallas)"	5:44
11.	"Think (Curtis Mayfield)"	3:43
Total length:		56:34

== Personnel ==
- Lucky Peterson – Arranger, Guitar (Acoustic), Guitar (Electric), National Duolian, Piano, Producer, Vocals
- Larry Campbell (musician) – Arranger, Guitar (Acoustic), Mandolin, National Duolian, Pedal Steel
- Gary Burke - Arranger, Drums
- Scott Petito - Arranger, Bass, Engineer, Mastering, Mixing, Octave Mandolin, Shaker
- Tamara Peterson - Vocals (8, 10)
- Doug Yoel - Arranger, Cover Photo, Liner Notes, Photography, Producer, Selection
- Francis Dreyfus - Producer
- Beth Reineke - Assistant Engineer, Inside Photo
- Valérie Lefebvre - Package Coordinator
- Djémila Boukhlifa - Package Coordinator

== Awards and nominations ==
- Winner - Grand Prix du Disque - Best Blues Album (2010, FRANCE)
- Nominee - Blues Music Award - Best Acoustic Blues Album (2011, USA)
