= Hidden Strength (album) =

Studio album by Hidden Strength
- Released: 1975
- Label: United Artists
- Producer: Michael Cuscuna
- Associate producers: Grover Underwood; Robin Kenyatta; Roy Herring

Hidden Strength is a 1975 album by the disco/funk band Hidden Strength. It was released on the United Artists label. It also contains the hit single, "Hustle on Up (Do the Bump)".

== Background ==
It was reported in the 4 October 1975 issue of Billboard that studio owner George Klabin was working with producer Mike Cuscuna remixing the upcoming Hidden Strength LP album.

== Reception ==
The album had a positive review in the 17 January 1976 issue of Cash Box. With the reviewer pointing out that funk and Latin were all in abundance on the album and sound was "of the street", the dance-play and disco potential was also noted. The top picks on the album were "Why Does It Feel So Good to Me", "I Wanna Be Your Main Man", "It Didn't Have to Be This Way" and "Angel of Love".

The album had a positive review in the 28 January issue of The Walrus, where it was referred to as "Tightly wound modern R&B". The reviewer also wrote that the album was supported with a positively nasty rhythm section and went beyond disco.

== Charts ==
=== Cash Box ===
==== Top 50 R&B albums ====
The Hidden Strength album debuted at No. 47 in the Cash Box Top 50 R&B Albums chart for the week of 6 March 1976. It peaked at No. 45 for the week of 27 March and held that position for an additional week.

=== Record World ===
==== The Jazz LP Chart ====
The Hustle on Up album appeared in the Record World Jazz LP chart at No. 40 for the week of 20 March 1976.

==== 151–200 Album Chart ====
For the week of 8 May, the album debuted at No. 190 in the Record World 151–200 Album chart. It was at No. 187 for the week of 22 May.

=== Billboard ===
==== Soul LPs ====
The album debuted at No. 58 in the Billboard Soul LPs chart for the week of 29 May. It held that position for an additional week.

== Track listing ==
=== Side A ===
1. "It Didn't Have to Be This Way" – 5:45
2. "Happy Song" – 5:53
3. "Angel of Love" – 5:08
4. "Hustle On Up (Do the Bump)" – 3:10

=== Side B ===
1. "Why Does It Feel So Good to Me" – 4:55
2. "I Wanna be Your Main Man" – 6:00
3. "Hustle On Up (Do the Bump)" (instrumental) – 4:06
4. "All We Need Is Time" – 5:00

== Credits ==
- Roy Herring – lead vocals, backing vocals
- Ken Sullivan – acoustic piano, electric piano, organ (04), Moog synthesizer (06), clavinet, strings, backing vocals
- Alvin Brown – bass, backing vocals
- Grover Underwood – electric piano, clavinet, organ, Moog bass, vibraphone, backing vocals, arranger
- Robert Leach – tenor saxophone, backing vocals
- Ray Anderson – trombone, backing vocals, congas, percussion
- Al Thomas – drums, percussion, backing vocals

=== Additional musicians ===
- Robin Kenyatta – alto flute (02), alto saxophone (03)
- Hamiet Bluiett – baritone saxophone
- Ralph MacDonald – congas, percussion
- Baikida E.J. Carroll – trumpet
- Carl Hall, Sharon Redd, Tasha Thomas – backing vocals

=== Production ===
- Michael Cuscuna – producer
