= Blues Bred in the Bone =

Studio album by Ray Anderson
- Released: 1988
- Recorded: March 27 & 28, 1988
- Studio: A & R Studios, NYC
- Genre: Jazz
- Length: 45:35
- Label: Enja; ENJ 5081
- Producer: Ray Anderson

Ray Anderson chronology
It Just So Happens (1987)	Blues Bred in the Bone (1988)	What Because (1989)

Blues Bred in the Bone is an album by trombonist Ray Anderson which was recorded in 1988 and released on the Enja label.

== Reception ==
Professional ratings
Review scores
Source	Rating
Allmusic	1.5/5 stars

The Allmusic review by Scott Yanow stated "Unlike on his previous Old Bottles - New Wine recording, trombonist Ray Anderson's high-note technique gets the better of him on this set. He often comes across as a one-line Las Vegas comedian who constantly exclaims, "Look how high I can play!" ... this has to be considered one of Anderson's lesser efforts".

== Track listing ==
All compositions by Ray Anderson except where noted

1. "Blues Bred in the Bone" – 7:58
2. "53rd and Greenwood" – 8:04
3. "Mona Lisa" (Ray Evans, Jay Livingston) – 4:46
4. "Datune" – 5:19
5. "A Flower Is a Lovesome Thing" (Billy Strayhorn) – 6:22
6. "Hemlines" – 7:56
7. "I Don't Want to Set the World on Fire" (Bennie Benjamin, Eddie Durham, Sol Marcus, Eddie Seiler) – 5:10

== Personnel ==
- Ray Anderson – trombone
- John Scofield – guitar
- Anthony Davis – piano
- Mark Dresser – bass
- Johnny Vidacovich – drums
