= I'm Ready =

I'm Ready may refer to:

== Music ==
=== Albums ===
- I'm Ready (Muddy Waters album), 1978
- I'm Ready (Natalie Cole album), 1983
- I'm Ready (Lucky Peterson album), 1993
- I'm Ready (Tevin Campbell album), 1993
- I'm Ready (EP), by AJR, 2013
- I'm Ready, by Elva Hsiao, 2011

=== Songs ===
- "I'm Ready" (AJR song), 2013
- "I'm Ready" (Muddy Waters song), 1954
- "I'm Ready" (Bryan Adams song), 1983
- "I'm Ready" (Cherie song), 2004
- "I'm Ready" (Sori song), 2018
- "I'm Ready" (Sam Smith and Demi Lovato song), 2020
- "I'm Ready" (Tevin Campbell song), 1993
- "I'm Ready", by Fats Domino, 1959
- "I'm Ready", by David Archuleta from the album Postcards in the Sky, 2017
- "I'm Ready", by Tina Turner from the album Tina!, 2008
- "I'm Ready", by Gin Blossoms from the album No Chocolate Cake, 2010
- "I'm Ready", by Kano, 1980
- "I'm Ready", by Tulisa Contostavlos from the album The Female Boss, 2012
- "I'm Ready", by Uriah Heep from the album Into the Wild, 2011
- "I'm Ready", by Tracy Chapman from New Beginning, 1995
- "I'm Ready", by Jaden Smith from the soundtrack of the 2020 video game Marvel's Spider-Man: Miles Morales
- "I'm Ready", by Size 9, 1995

== Other uses ==
- Im Ready or IMReady, public safety portal and mobile app by GMA News and Public Affairs
