= Lovin' the Night Away (album) =

Studio album by The Dillman Band
- Released: 1981
- Studio: Fame Recording Studios
- Label: RCA Victor AFL1-3909
- Producers: Rick Hall
- Executive producer: Bob Skaff

The Dillman Band chronology
| The Daisy Dillman Band (1978) | Lovin' the Night Away (1981) | Radio (2015) |

Lovin' the Night Away is a 1981 album by The Dillman Band. It contains their hit single of the same name.

== Background ==
Lovin’ The Night Away was recorded at Fame Recording Studios and released in 1981. It is the second album by The Dillman Band aka The Daisy Dillman Band.

== Reception ==
As written in Kal Rudman's (FMQB Album) report, 17 April 1981, John Hayes of KTCL in Fort Collins reported that The Dillman Band played at their year-end party which was held at Sam's Ballroom. He said that they were a dynamic band and it showed on their album. However, he did say that there were a few weak cuts, but his advice was to check it out.

The album was reviewed in the 16 May 1981 issue of Billboard. The review was positive with the writer saying that melody abounds on all of the tracks. The picks were, "Lovin' the Night Away", "Slow Ride" and "Breakdown".

It has been given four stars by AllMusic.

== Charts ==
=== Record World ===
The album debuted at No. 199 in the Record World 101-200 Albums chart for the week of 2 May 1981. It peaked at No. 177 for the week of 20 June 1981.

=== Billboard ===
The album debuted at No. 190 in the Billboard Top LPs & Tape chart for the week of 16 May.

== Album tracks ==
=== A ===
1. "Lovin' the Night Away" - (Steve Seamans; Pat Frederick) - 03:57
2. "Breakdown" - (Walt Aldridge) 03:53
3. "Love Don’t Run" - (Steve Pippin, Larry Keith) - 03:56
4. "Roll Like a Stone" - (Steve Seamans) - 03:33
5. "So Much the Smoother" - (Pat Frederick, Luca, Swarbrick, Pegg, Mattacks) 03:30

=== B ===
1. "Slow Ride Home" - (Walt Aldridge) - 03:32
2. "She’s Just a Stranger" - (Steve Seamans) - 03:38
3. "C.O.D." - (Steve Seamans) - 03:52
4. "Spending Time, Making Love, And Going Crazy" - (Dobie Gray, Eddie Setser, Troy Seals) - 04:24

== Personnel ==
Musicians

- Bass - Dik Shopteau
- Drums - Dan Flaherty
- Guitar - Steve Solmonson
- Guitar - Steve Seamans
- Slide Guitar - Steve Seamans
- Pedal Steel Guitar- Steve Seamans
- Piano - Pat Frederick
- Violin - Pat Frederick
- Percussion - Pat Frederick
- Percussion - Dan Flaherty
- Vocals - Steve Seamans
- Vocals- Steve Solmonson
- Vocal s- Pat Frederick

Other Musicians

- Bass - Ralph Ezell
- Drums - Owen Hale
- Guitar - Walt Aldridge
- Guitar - Jimmy English
- Guitar - Mac McAnally
- Keyboards - Steve Nathan
- Sax - Guy Higginbothem
- Sax - Harvey Thompson

Other credits

- Producer – Rick Hall
- Producer (Executive) – Bob Skaff
- Engineer (Recording) – Mike Daniel, Ralph Ezell, Rick Hall, Walt Aldridge
- Design – Emily Lorsbach
- Illustration – Joo Chung
- Photography – Robert Whitman
