= Hustle on Up (Do the Bump) =

Song

from the album Hidden Strength
- A-side: "Hustle on Up (Do the Bump)"
- B-side: "Hustle on Up (Do the Bump) (Instrumental)"
- Released: 1975
- Length: 3:10
- Label: United Artists UA-XW733-Y
- Composer: (T. Moss/M.Brown/R. Herring/G. Underwood)
- Producers: Michael Cuscuna In Assoc. with Grover Underwood & Roy Herring

United States chronology
"Hustle on Up (Do the Bump)" (1975)	"I Don't Want to Be a Lone Ranger" (1976)

"Hustle on Up (Do the Bump)" was a 1975 single for the group Hidden Strength. It was a hit for them in 1976, registering in multiple charts.

== Background ==
"Hustle on Up (Do the Bump)" was composed by Roy Herring and Grover Underwood. However the single has the composers listed as T. Moss, M. Brown, R. Herring and G. Underwood.

The band Hidden Strength was made up of Roy Herring on vocals, Grover Underwood on keyboards, Ken Sullivan on keyboards, Ray Anderson on trombone, Robert Leach on saxophone, Alvin Brown on bass and Al Thomas on drums.

In early 1976, a Hustle on Up dance contest was held at Roosevelt's Grand Ballroom. Fifty dance contestants competed with the winning couple taking the prize of $1000.

== Reception ==
"Hustle on Up (Do the Bump)" was one of the Cash Box Picks of the Week for the week of 7 February 1976. The review was positive with the reviewer writing that the single was "hottest disco sounds to reach these ears in quite a while". It was given five stars.

The single was reviewed in the 27 February issue of Billboard where it was one of the Top Single Picks. The reviewer called it a strong disco cut that made good use of the synthesizer.

The single was reviewed by James Hamilton in his New Spins section of the 3 April issue of Record Mirror & Disc. He referred to it as useful if unspectacular disco fodder.

== Airplay ==
As shown in the 16 April issue of Radio & Records that "Hustle on Up" was seeing significant action on Black radio.

The single was at No. 24 in the Radio & Records Singles Airplay/40 chart for the week of 30 April. It then dropped off the chart. It reappeared at No. 37 in the same chart for the week of 14 May. It peaked again at No. 32 the following week.

The single was seeing action in Canada and as per the 10 July issue of RPM Weekly, it was playlisted at CJRW in Summerside.

== Charts ==
=== Billboard ===
==== Hot Soul Singles ====
"Hustle on Up (Do the Bump)" debuted at No. 100 in the Billboard Hot Soul Singles chart for the week of 28 February 1976. At week eleven, the single peaked at No. 35 for the week of 8 May. It held that position for an additional week.

==== Bubbling Under the Hot 100 ====
The single entered the Billboard Bubbling Under the Hot 100 chart at No. 105 for the week of 13 March. It didn't progress any further.

=== Cash Box ===
==== Looking Ahead ====
"Hustle on Up (Do the Bump)" made its debut at No. 118 in the Cash Box Looking Ahead chart for the week of 6 March 1976. With the chart now renamed to Looking Ahead to the Top 100, the single was at No. 114 for the week of 27 March. The single peaked at No. 105 for the week of 8 May.

==== Top 100 R&B ====
For the week of 6 March 1976, "Hustle on Up (Do the Bump)" debuted at No. 98 in the Cash Box Top 100 R&B chart. Having been in the chart for fourteen weeks, it peaked at No. 27 for the week of 5 June. It was still in the chart for the week of 19 June.

=== Record World ===
==== The R&B Singles Chart ====
"Hustle on Up (Do the Bump)" debuted at No. 75 on the Record World R&B Singles chart for the week of 27 March. It peaked at No. 35 for the week of 22 May and held that position for an additional week. It was still in the chart for the week of 12 June.

==== The 101 - 150 Singles Chart ====
The single made its debut at No. 126 on the 101 - 150 Singles chart for the week of 24 April. The record peaked at No. 116 for the week of 8 May and held that position for another week. It was still in the chart for the week of 22 May.

== Band members ==
- Ray Anderson
- Alvin Brown
- Roy Herring
- Robert Leach
- Ken Sullivan
- Al Thomas
- Grover Underwood
