= Bob Skaff =

- Also known as: Robert Skaff
- Born: 27 November 1930; Cleveland, Ohio, United States
- Origin: United States
- Died: 23 May 2012 (aged 81) Lakewood, Ohio, United States
- Occupations: Music executive, record producer
- Years active: 1960s - 1980s
- Labels: Liberty Records, United Artists Records

Bob Skaff was a music executive and record producer. Artists he worked with include Paul Anka, The Daisy Dillman Band, Hidden Strength, Little Anthony and the Imperials and many others.

== Background ==
Bob Skaff played a big part in the release of Johnny Rivers' At the Whisky à Go Go album. Al Bennett of Liberty Records was reluctant to have the recording released but Skaff who heard and liked the tape convinced him to release it. He also was the one who suggested to Paul Anka that "(You're) Having My Baby" be made a duet. So Anka recorded it with singer Odia.

During the 1970s, Bob Skaff was vice-president of United Artists Records as well as president of Paul Anka Productions.

He was Paul Anka's cousin.

== Career ==
=== 1960s ===
It was reported in the 1 May 1965 issue of Record World that Bob Skaff, vice-president of Liberty Records at the time and A&R chief Don Blocker were on a three-week tour. While Blocker was scouting talent in Chicago, St. Louis, Philadelphia, Detroit, New York City, Washington and Boston, Skaff was concentrating on the promotion scene.

In 1965, Liberty Records was experiencing an upward surge in record sales. It was described by Record World in the magazine's 20 November issue as one of the briskest periods in its history. Skaff, the vice president of A&R promotion had ordered promotion men throughout the country to "bring in that record". He was pushing the coordinated effort to spread the "action" singles that were breaking into different markets. With Liberty national promotion director Pat Pipolo having left on a tour to get the promotion going, Skaff had ordered a major concentration of promotion material to be sent to the label's promotion men everywhere.

Skaff produced the song, "Out of Sight, Out of Mind" for Little Anthony and the Imperials which was released in 1969. The record made it to No. 52 on the Billboard Hot 100 and No. 38 on the Soul Singles chart.

=== 1970s ===
In 1973, Skaff became a partner in Fame Records. He would sign Paul Anka to the label. This led to Anka having the mega hit, "(You're) Having My Baby".

Bob Skaff produced "Times of Your Life" by Paul Anka. The song peaked at No. 7 nationally. Skaff, along with Stan Kulin, Keith Patten, Allan Matthews presented gold and platinum records to Paul Anka. The event was photographed and published in the 11 December 1976 issue of RPM Weekly.

Working with Johnny Harris, he co-produced the single "Jubilation" bw "Tip Top Theme" that was credited to The Johnny Harris Orchestra and released on the United Artists Records label in 1976.

"I Don't Want to Be a Lone Ranger" was recorded by Hidden Strength and released on the United Artists Record label in 1976. It was produced by Denny Diante while Skaff was the executive producer. It was a hit, peaking at No. 78 on the Billboard Hot Soul Singles chart, and No. 74 on the Cash Box Top 100 R&B chart.

=== 1980s ===
Skaff was the executive producer for the Lovin’ the Night Away album by the Dillman Band which was produced by Rick Hall and released on the RCA Victor label in 1981.

== Death ==
Bob Skaff died at his home on at age 81 on 23 May 2012.
