= Azurety =

Studio album by Ray Anderson, Han Bennink and Christy Doran
- Released: 1994
- Recorded: April 21 & 22, 1994
- Studio: Radio DRS, Zurich, Switzerland
- Genre: Jazz
- Length: 55:33
- Label: hat ART; CD 6155
- Producer: Pia Uehlinger, Werner X. Uehlinger, Ulrich Kurth

Ray Anderson chronology
Big Band Record (1994)	Azurety (1994)	Don't Mow Your Lawn (1994)

Han Bennink chronology
Eleven Ghosts (1994)	Azurety (1994)	Cheer Up (1995)

Azurety is an album by trombonist/tubist Ray Anderson, drummer Han Bennink and guitarist Christy Doran which was released on the hat ART label in 1994.

== Reception ==
Professional ratings
Review scores
Source	Rating
Allmusic	4/5 stars

The Allmusic review by Glenn Astarita stated "On this release, the trio is simply having a blast as they surge forward with the intensity of your average high-octane, heavy metal rock outfit. ... The trio engages in uninhibited dialogue in concert with ominous sounding undercurrents thanks to a rollicking and rolling presentation of pieces spanning bluesy, dirge-like progressions and turbulently executed exchanges. ... The musicians also provide the listener with softly enacted swing vamps along with some downright riotous interplay. Recommended!".

== Track listing ==
All compositions by Ray Anderson except where noted

1. "Open House" (Christy Doran) – 11:21
2. "Azurety" – 7:04
3. "B & D" (Han Bennink, Christy Doran) – 4:29
4. "March of the Hipsters" – 6:54
5. "Heights" (Doran) – 10:55
6. "Just Squeeze Me" (Duke Ellington) – 3:29
7. "A B D" (Anderson, Bennink, Doran) – 3:26
8. 'The Waters Dixon Line" – 7:55

== Personnel ==
- Ray Anderson – trombone, tuba
- Han Bennink – drums
- Christy Doran – acoustic guitar, electric guitar, delay devices
