= Cheer Up (Ray Anderson, Han Bennink and Christy Doran album) =

Live album by Ray Anderson, Han Bennink and Christy Doran
- Released: 1995
- Recorded: March 15 & 16, 1995
- Venue: Schulhaus Oberengstringen, Zürich, Switzerland
- Genre: Jazz
- Length: 51:41
- Label: hat ART; CD 6175
- Producer: Pia Uehlinger, Werner X. Uehlinger

Ray Anderson chronology
Slideride (1995)	Cheer Up (1995)	Where Home Is (1998)

Han Bennink chronology
Irène Schweizer & Han Bennink (1995)	Cheer Up (1995)	Serpentine (1996)

Cheer Up is a live album by trombonist/tubist Ray Anderson, drummer Han Bennink and guitarist Christy Doran which was released on the hat ART label in 1995.

== Reception ==
Professional ratings
Review scores
Source	Rating
Allmusic	4/5 stars

The Allmusic review by Thom Jurek stated "This trio's first recording, the wonderful Azurety, met with acclaim by critics and music fans alike for its gleeful abandon, musically astute terrorism, and tunes that were stop-on-a-dime tight. The trio, which was initially together just for a tour, is now a working unit and this second recording proves it. ... This date is killer -- a blast to listen to. Guaranteed to cheer you up, even if you don't need it".

== Track listing ==
All compositions by Ray Anderson except where noted

1. "No Return" (Christy Doran) – 7:21
2. "My Children Are the Reason Why I Need to Own My Publishing" – 4:34
3. "Tabasco Cart" (Ray Anderson, Han Bennink, Christy Doran) – 10:25
4. "Like Silver" – 3:57
5. "Cheer Up" (Doran) – 8:48
6. "Buckethead" (Anderson, Bennink, Doran) – 3:11
7. "Melancholy Mood" (Horace Silver) – 5:45
8. "New H.G." (Doran) – 3:54
9. "Hence the Reason" – 3:46

== Personnel ==
- Ray Anderson – trombone, tuba
- Han Bennink – drums
- Christy Doran – guitars
