= Kenny Neal =

American blues guitarist and singer (born 1967)

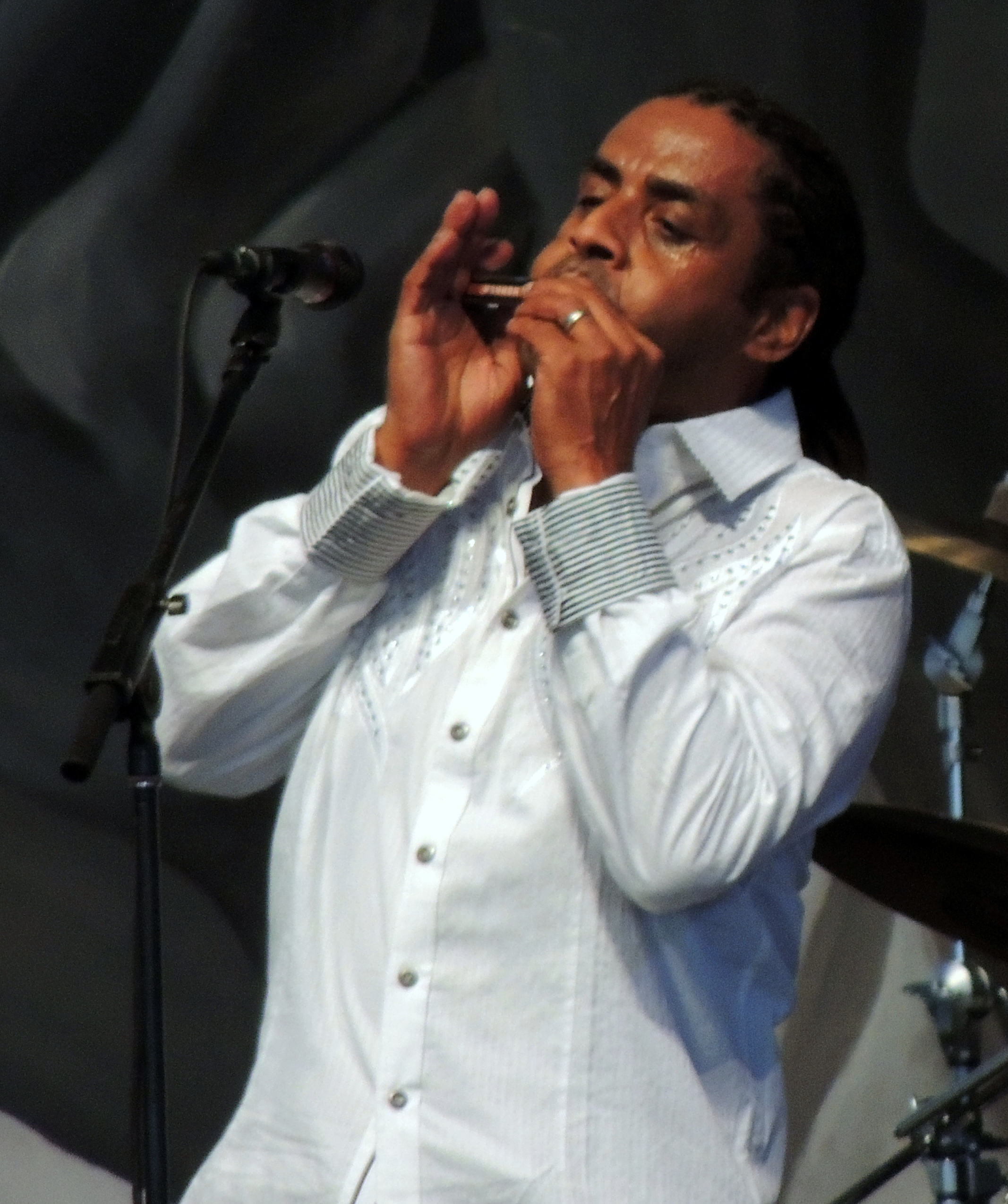
- Neal performing at New Orleans Jazzfest in 2012

Background information
- Born: October 14, 1957 (age 68); New Orleans, Louisiana, United States
- Genres: Blues
- Occupations: Guitarist, singer
- Instrument: Guitar
- Labels: Cleopatra Blues, a division of Cleopatra Records, various others
- Website: www.kennyneal.net

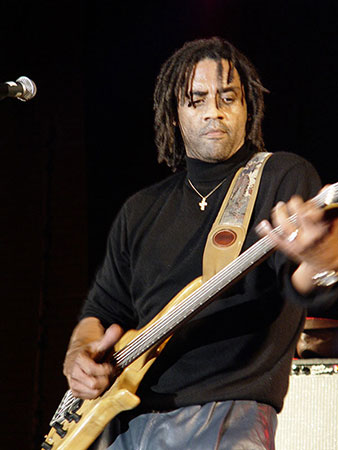
Kenny Neal at Djurs Bluesfestival, Denmark (2009)

Kenny Neal (born October 14, 1957), is an American blues guitar player, singer, and band member.

Neal was born in New Orleans, Louisiana, the son of Raful Neal, and he comes from a musical family. He has often performed with his brothers in his band. In 2026 Neal was inducted into the Blues Hall of Fame.

== Career ==
Neal preserves the blues sound of his native south Louisiana, as befits someone who learned from Slim Harpo, Buddy Guy, and his father, harmonica player Raful Neal.

In 1987, Neal cut his debut album for the Florida record producer Bob Greenlee — an updated swamp feast initially marketed on King Snake Records as Bio on the Bayou. Alligator Records picked it up the following year, retitling it Big News from Baton Rouge!! He released his third album, Walking on Fire, in 1991.

In 1991, he proved to be a talented actor in the Broadway production of the folk musical Mule Bone (by Langston Hughes and Zora Neale Hurston), singing numbers written by Taj Mahal.

Neal has played with blues stars including Lucky Peterson and Lazy Lester, and was at one time a member of The Downchild Blues Band, during a period of relocation to Toronto, Ontario, Canada.

In September 2006, Neal announced he was taking a year's break from recording and performing, due to an undisclosed illness. He returned to the public eye at the Monterey Blues Festival in June 2007. He has children named Kenny, Syreeta, and Micah.

In 2010, he was touring with the Efes Pilsen Blues Festival.

In 2016, Neal's album Bloodline received a Grammy Award nomination for Best Contemporary Blues Album. Neal recorded Bloodline in Nashville, Los Angeles and Baton Rouge. He co-produced it with Buddy Guy’s Grammy-winning producer, Tom Hambridge.

== Awards ==
Honors

- 2026 - Inducted into the Blues Hall of Fame
- 2011 - Inducted into the Louisiana Music Hall of Fame
- 2005 - Official Statement to Kenny Neal, by the Governor of Louisiana
- 1993 - Washington, D.C., USIA Certificate of Appreciation for representing the U.S. with Kenny Neal's Blues Band for tour in Africa

Winner

- 2019 - Blues Music Award for Contemporary Blues Male Artist of the Year
- 2011 - Jus' Blues Music Foundation Contemporary/Traditional Blues Song Of The Year for "Hooked on Your Love"
- 2011 - Critic's Poll Living Blues Award for Best Contemporary Blues Album of the Year
- 2009 - Monterey Bay Blues (M.O.B.B.A.Y.) Artist of the Year Award
- 2009 - Blues Music Award winner for Song of the Year, "Let Life Flow"
- 2009 - West Coast Blues Hall of Fame Awards for Blues CD of the Year "Let Life Flow" and Blues Band of the Year
- 2009 - Blueswax Album of the Year "Let Life Flow"
- 2008 - Blues Critic Awards Readers Poll, Blues Album of the Year "Let Life Flow" and also Contemporary Blues Artist of the Year
- 2008 - Jus' Blues Awards "Junior Wells Harp Award"
- 2008 - Hometown Video Awards, Entertainment Talk Show
- 2007 - W.A.V.E. Award, Talk Show-Entertainment/Pro
- 2005 - W.C. Handy Blues Awards - Acoustic Blues Album
- 2003 - Slim Harpo Award in Baton Rouge
- 1994 - Theatre World Award "Outstanding New Talent" on Broadway
- 1989 - Big Bill Broonzy Award in Paris
- 1989 - JD Miller Award "Outstanding Performance"

Nominated

- 2016 - Grammy Nomination for Bloodline - "Best Contemporary Blues Album"
- 2009 - Grammy nominations in four categories
- 1999 - Grammy Nomination for Tribute to Howlin' Wolf - "Best Traditional Blues Album"

== See also ==
- List of blues musicians
- Long Beach Blues Festival
- San Francisco Blues Festival
