= Michael Cuscuna =

American jazz record producer (1948–2024)

- Cuscuna in 1995

Background information
- Born: September 20, 1948; Stamford, Connecticut, U.S.
- Died: April 20, 2024 (aged 75) Stamford, Connecticut, U.S.
- Genres: Jazz
- Occupation: Record producer
- Labels: ESP-Disk; Atlantic; Motown; ABC; Blue Note; Mosaic

Michael Cuscuna (September 20, 1948 – April 20, 2024) was an American jazz record producer and writer. He was the co-founder of Mosaic Records and a discographer of Blue Note Records.

== Biography ==
=== Career ===
Cuscuna played drums, saxophone and flute while young, but placed his emphasis on founding his own record label. He had a jazz show on WXPN and worked for ESP-Disk late in the 1960s, in addition to writing for Jazz & Pop Magazine and Down Beat. He moved from WXPN to WMMR in 1970, then onto WABC-FM (now WPLJ) as a progressive rock DJ at both stations. He took a position as a producer with Atlantic Records in the 1970s, recording Dave Brubeck and the Art Ensemble of Chicago. In the early 1970s, he also produced albums by Bonnie Raitt (Give It Up) and Chris Smither. He also worked at Motown, ABC (for reissues of Impulse! albums), Arista, Muse, Freedom, Elektra and Novus.

In 1975 Cuscuna produced the Hidden Strength self-titled album. It made it to No. 45 on the Cash Box Top 50 R&B Albums chart, and No. 58 on the Billboard Soul LPs chart the following year. The single from the album, "Hustle on Up (Do the Bump)" also was a hit, peaking at No. 35 on the Billboard Hot Soul Singles chart,. and No. 27 on the Cash Box Top 100 R&B singles chart.

From 1975 to 1981, he searched the Blue Note archive for previously unissued sessions which began to be issued during this period.

In collaboration with business partner Charlie Lourie, he founded Mosaic Records in 1983 specializing in jazz reissue box sets sold by mail order. Artists surveyed include highly visible masters like Thelonious Monk, Miles Davis, and Nat "King" Cole, and lesser known artists such as Tina Brooks and Ike Quebec. Cuscuna won three Grammy Awards for his releases. From 1984 onwards, he handled all reissues for Blue Note records.

=== Personal life ===
Cuscuna was born on September 20, 1948, in Stamford, Connecticut.

Cuscuna died of complications from esophageal cancer at his home in Stamford on April 20, 2024, at the age of 75.

== Grammy Awards ==
- 1993: Best Historical Album for Nat King Cole, The Complete Capitol Trio Recordings
- 1999: Best Album Notes for Miles Davis, Miles Davis Quintet 1965–1968 (with Bob Belden and Todd Coolman)
- 2002: Best Historical Album for Billie Holiday, Lady Day: The Complete Billie Holiday on Columbia 1933–1944 (with Michael Brooks)

== Publications ==
- Syoichi Yui; Michael Cuscuna (1987). Blue Note Jazz Story (in Japanese). Tokyo: Shinchosha.
- Michael Cuscuna; Charlie Lourie; Oscar Schnider (1998). The Blue Note Years. Jazz- Photographie. Zurich: Edition Stemmle.
