= Don't Mow Your Lawn =

Studio album by Ray Anderson Alligatory Band

Studio album by Ray Anderson Alligatory Band
- Released: July 26, 1994
- Recorded: 1994
- Genre: Jazz
- Length: 60:11
- Label: Enja; ENJ 8070

Ray Anderson chronology
Azurety (1994)	Don't Mow Your Lawn (1994)	Slideride (1995)

Don't Mow Your Lawn is an album by trombonist Ray Anderson and his Alligatory band which was released on the Enja label in 1994.

== Reception ==
Professional ratings
Review scores
Source	Rating
Allmusic	3.5/5 stars

The Allmusic review by Scott Yanow stated "Trombonist Ray Anderson is typically uninhibited throughout this joke-filled set. His high-note screams are well-matched by trumpeter Lew Soloff and some of the vocals (most notably on the title cut) are memorable. There is some strong playing by the two horns ... the humor and philosophizing are often dominant".

== Track listing ==
All compositions by Ray Anderson except where noted

1. "Don't Mow Your Lawn" (Ray Anderson, Jackie Raven) – 5:39
2. "Diddleybop" – 8:44
3. "Damaged But Good" (Anderson, Raven) – 5:31
4. "Alligatory Pecadillo" – 7:41
5. "What'cha Gonna Do With That" (Anderson, Raven) – 5:28
6. "Airwaves" – 10:30
7. "Blow Your Own Horn" (Anderson, Raven) – 9:45
8. "Disguise the Limit" – 6:53

== Personnel ==
- Ray Anderson – trombone, lead vocal
- Lew Soloff – trumpet
- Jerome Harris – guitar, background vocal
- Gregory Jones – bass, background vocal
- Tommy Campbell – drums
- Frank Colón – percussion
