= It Just So Happens =

Studio album by Ray Anderson
- Released: 1987
- Recorded: January 31 and February 1, 1987
- Studio: Van Gelder Studio, Englewood Cliffs, NJ
- Genre: Jazz
- Length: 53:35
- Label: Enja; ENJ 5037
- Producer: Matthias Winckelmann

Ray Anderson chronology
| Old Bottles - New Wine (1985) | It Just So Happens (1987) | Blues Bred in the Bone (1988) |

It Just So Happens is an album by trombonist Ray Anderson which was recorded in 1987 and released on the Enja label.

== Reception ==
Professional ratings
Review scores
| Source | Rating |
|---|---|
| Allmusic | 3/5 stars |

The Allmusic review by Scott Yanow stated "Although trombonist Ray Anderson sounded fine on his earlier trio and quartet dates, he really comes into his own when joined by other horns. ... An excellent example of the innovative Ray Anderson's work".

== Track listing ==
All compositions by Ray Anderson except where noted

1. "Once in a While" (Michael Edwards, Bud Green) – 6:17
2. "It Just So Happens" – 5:52
3. "Ross the Boss" – 7:29
4. "Elegy for Joe Scott" – 5:20
5. "La Vie en Rose" (Louiguy, Marguerite Monnot, Édith Piaf) – 4:15
6. "Once in a While" [Alternate Take] (Edwards, Green) – 6:24 Additional track on CD release
7. "Raven's Jolly Jump Up" – 5:24
8. "Fatelet" – 6:59
9. "Fishin' With Gramps" – 4:57

== Personnel ==
- Ray Anderson – trombone
- Stanton Davis – trumpet
- Perry Robinson – clarinet
- Bob Stewart – tuba
- Mark Dresser – bass
- Ronnie Burrage – drums
