= Ain't That a Bitch =

Ain’t That a Bitch

Studio album by Johnny "Guitar" Watson
- Released: June 19, 1976
- Recorded: 1976
- Studio: Paramount Recording Studios, Hollywood, California
- Genre: Soul, funk
- Label: DJM DJLPA-3
- Producer: Johnny Guitar Watson

Johnny "Guitar" Watson chronology
I Don’t Want to Be a Lone Ranger (1975)	Ain’t That a Bitch (1976)	Real Mother for Ya (1977)

Ain’t That a Bitch is a funk album by the American musician Johnny "Guitar" Watson, whose long career influenced the development of blues, soul music, rhythm and blues, funk and rock music. It was recorded and released in 1976.

It was Watson's first successful funk album and contains a few of his best-known funk songs. It was certified as a Gold Record for sales of more than 500,000 copies.

== Critical reception ==
In a retrospective review for AllMusic, Stephen Cook praised Ain't That a Bitch, saying it "works beautifully as a first-disc choice for newcomers [to Watson], especially those who want to hear the '70s funk material."

In 1998, The Wire included Ain't That a Bitch in their list of "100 Records That Set the World on Fire (While No One Was Listening)", where the staff described it as "the best-sounding funk album of all time", complimenting its futuristic lyrics (as on "Superman Lover") and "Watson's unerring ear for note placement" and praising its sound for being "as steely and urgently urban as Edgard Varèse, as slinky as Nat King Cole, as sharp and sassy as no one else in recorded history."

== Track listing ==
All tracks composed by Johnny "Guitar" Watson; except where indicated. The original 1976 release track list is as follows:

1. "I Need It" (4:46)
2. "I Want to Ta-Ta You Baby" (5:49)
3. "Superman Lover" (Reynaldo Rey, Watson) (5:44)
4. "Ain't That a Bitch" (5:02)
5. "Since I Met You Baby (3:30)
6. "We're No Exception" (4:18)
7. "Won't You Forgive Me Baby" (5:17)

In 2003 the UK music company Sanctuary Records, under the Castle Records label, re-released and digitally remastered the album as a "Deluxe Expanded Edition" on compact disc. The track listing was the same, but with two bonus tracks:

1. "I Need It" (7" single edit) (3:31)
2. "Superman Lover" (7" single edit) (3:18)

In 2005 the American music company Shout! Factory Records also re-released the album on compact disc and on vinyl record. The track listing was the same as the original, but with two different bonus tracks:

1. "Funkula" (4:20)
2. "Follow Me" (4:36) (this instrumental was released in 1979 on the album Extra Disco Perception under his funk band name "The Watsonian Institute")

== Personnel ==
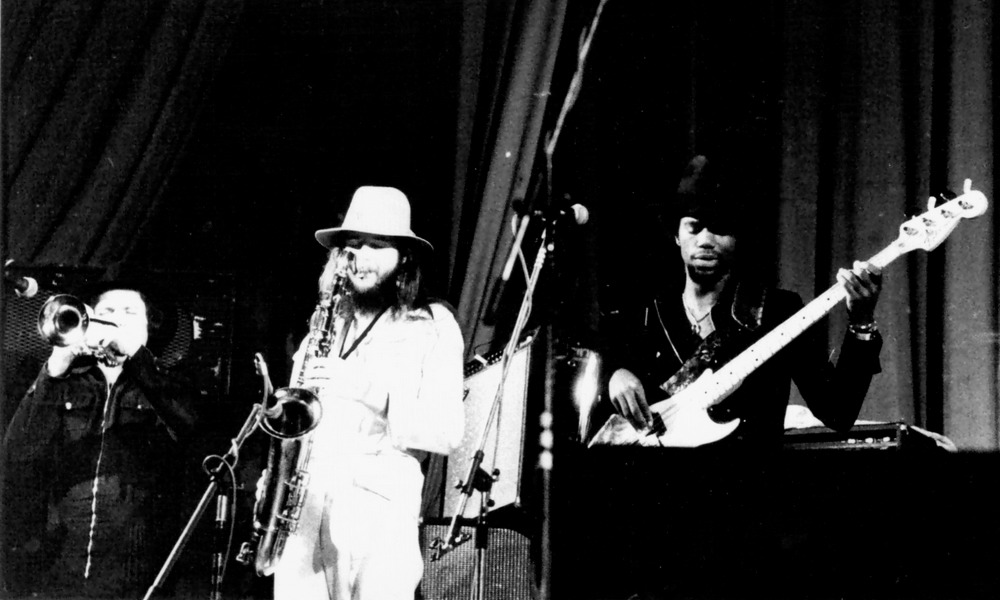
Peter Martin (trumpet) and Paul Dunmall (tenor saxophone) in Watson's orchestra in 1976

- Johnny "Guitar" Watson – organ, synthesizer, bass, guitar, piano, conga, drums, keyboards and vocals
- Paul Dunmall – saxophone
- Peter Martin – trumpet
- Tommy Robertson – trombone
- Emry Thomas – drums, backing vocals, production assistant
- Kerry McNabb – engineer

== Samples by other artists ==
Several tracks from the album have been sampled by other artists:

- "I Want to Ta-Ta You Baby"
  - "Sooperman Luva II" by Redman from the album Dare Iz a Darkside
- "Superman Lover"
  - "A Day of Sooperman Lover" by Redman from the album Whut? Thee Album
  - "Supa GFK" by Ghostface Killah from the album The Big Doe Rehab
  - "The Nod Factor" by Mad Skillz from the album From Where???
  - "Who's the Mic Wrecka" by Da Youngsta's from the album The Aftermath
  - "Afro Puffs" by Lady of Rage from the soundtrack of Above the Rim
  - "The Predator" by Ice Cube from the album The Predator
  - "Comptons Lynchin'" by Compton's Most Wanted from the album Straight Checkn 'Em
  - "Broad Factor" by Quasimoto from the album Yessir Whatever
- "Ain't That a Bitch"
  - "Ain't That a Bitch (Ask Yourself)" by UGK from the album Ridin' Dirty
  - "Funk Soul Sensation" by Jemini the Gifted One from the album Scars and Pain
- "We're No Exception"
  - "Hot Thing" by Talib Kweli from the album Eardrum
