= Slideride =

Studio album by Ray Anderson, Craig Harris, George Lewis and Gary Valente
- Released: 1995
- Recorded: August 29 & 30, 1994
- Studio: Radio Bremen, Bremen, Germany
- Genre: Jazz
- Length: 64:28
- Label: hat ART; CD 6165
- Producer: Peter Schulze, Pia Uehlinger, Werner X. Uehlinger

Ray Anderson chronology
Don't Mow Your Lawn (1994)	Slideride (1995)	Cheer Up (1995)

George Lewis chronology
Changing With the Times (1994)	Slideride (1995)	The Usual Turmoil and Other Duets (1998)

Slideride is an album by trombonists Ray Anderson, Craig Harris, George Lewis, and Gary Valente which was released on the hat ART label in 1995.

== Reception ==
Professional ratings
Review scores
Source	Rating
Allmusic	4/5 stars

The Allmusic review by Scott Yanow stated "On this unusual date, the instrumentation is simply four trombones ... The performances are mostly pretty concise with free sections segueing logically into more arranged sections. No one trombonist emerges as the main star; in fact there is no attempt in the liner notes to point out who plays what although Anderson's high notes give him away at times. The adventurous music is clearly not for everyone but it generally works and one does not miss other instruments. Worth hearing".

== Track listing ==
All compositions by George Lewis except where noted

1. "Sweeps" – 4:11
2. "Miles" (Craig Harris) – 5:53
3. "Again Raven" (Ray Anderson) – 5:48
4. "Lotus Blossom" (Billy Strayhorn) – 3:53
5. "The Jeep Is Jumping" (Duke Ellington, Johnny Hodges) – 2:22
6. "Shadowgraph 5" – 7:40
7. "Shadow Catchers" (Harris) – 7:55
8. "Unison" – 8:03
9. "Four Some" (Anderson) – 7:05
10. "Oclupaca" (Ellington) – 6:01
11. "In Time Out" (Gary Valente) – 4:52

== Personnel ==
- Ray Anderson – trombone
- Craig Harris – trombone
- George Lewis – trombone
- Gary Valente – trombone
