= Space Guitar =

1954 instrumental by Johnny "Guitar" Watson

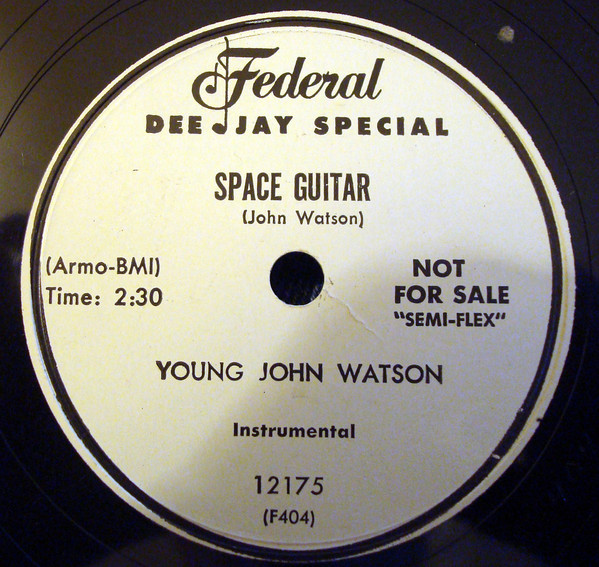
- DJ copy of 78 record label

Single by Young John Watson
- Released: April 1954
- Recorded: Los Angeles, February 1954
- Genre: Rhythm and blues; jump blues; blues instrumental
- Length: 2:30
- Label: Federal
- Songwriter: John Watson
- Producer: Ralph Bass

Official audio
- "Space Guitar" on YouTube

"Space Guitar" is an instrumental composed and recorded by American rhythm and blues artist Johnny "Guitar" Watson. Released as a single in 1954, it was Watson's first recording to showcase his guitar playing. The backing arrangement for the piece is fairly typical for R&B and jump blues at the time. However, Watson's groundbreaking performance on the electric guitar sets it apart.

Billboard magazine rated "Space Guitar" with a score of "77". The single did not appear in the magazine's charts. More current assessments describe the instrumental as being well ahead of its time with Watson's over-the-top guitar playing and the heavy use of audio effects. Guitarists, such as Bo Diddley, Ike Turner, Frank Zappa, Jimmy Page, and Jimi Hendrix have been identified as being influenced by Watson's novel approach. "Space Guitar" is included on several Watson and various artists compilations.

== Background ==
By April 1954, Watson had recorded three singles for Federal Records under the name "Young John Watson". Ralph Bass, the veteran rhythm-and-blues record producer, handled the production, but none had managed to reach the record charts. Watson, who was then 19 years old, had been performing primarily as a vocalist and pianist and other guitarists also appeared on his records. However, for "Space Guitar" he "came into his own as a guitarist", according to music historian Larry Birnbaum.

Originally from Texas, Watson was influenced by T-Bone Walker and Clarence "Gatemouth" Brown, but also incorporated his own ideas: "I was seeing all these new sounds I could create ... I wasn't afraid to take it a little further and see where it went." Commenting on his early style, Jon Hartley Fox wrote: "With jagged blurts of notes, a highly amplified tone, and quirky improvisational ideas, Watson stepped out fully formed as a major stylist." He was also a flamboyant performer and played the guitar with his teeth, behind his head, and while roaming through the audience and beyond – tricks in the style of Walker and Guitar Slim.

== Composition and recording ==
"Space Guitar" was, like a Googie coffee shop or an Olds Rocket 88, a sleek symbol of the modern age, looking to the future as it co-opted the past.

—David Ritz, musician biographer

Except for the guitar, "Space Guitar" has the sound and instrumentation typical for the time. It has been described as rhythm and blues, jump blues, and a blues guitar instrumental. The piece uses a stop-time arrangement, when the other musicians drop out during breaks. During these, Watson plays various guitar figures, including the introduction from the theme music from Dragnet, a popular 1950s television series, before the accompaniment resumes. However, it is Watson's guitar fills, soloing, and the novel use of the rather new reverb effect that have received the most attention.

Birnbaum describes Watson's guitar work as "furious bursts of notes, talking-guitar effects, jangling chords, jarring starts and stops, and wrenching blasts of echo and reverb". Although he fingerpicked the electric guitar, instead of the more common technique with guitar pick, Watson's playing has been described as "hyper-speed" and "rapid-fire". He also used exaggerated string bending and finger slides up and down the neck, which is further emphasized by the intermittent use of heavy reverb.

In the early 1950s, reverb, as an added audio effect in the studio, was "really the only 'effect' available in those days", according to Dan Forte of Guitar Player magazine. It was an attempt to reproduce natural reverberation, in which sounds dissipate more slowly, as in an empty hall or other large space. Reverb has also been used in recordings as "a metaphor for solitude and wide open spaces [and] the vast expanse of outer space". In an interview in 1994, Watson explained that it was also "a great way to sustain notes". Rather than being applied to the same degree throughout or for soloing, in "Space Guitar", reverberated elements dramatically jump in and out at various points in the recording, in what educator Simon Zagorski-Thomas calls "extreme or impossible mixes of spatial sound with the 'dry' [unprocessed] signal".

As with Watson's previous singles, "Space Guitar" was produced by Ralph Bass. The recording session took place in Los Angeles in February 1954, with backing musicians Devonia Willams on piano, Bill Gaither on tenor sax (who plays a 20-second solo about half-way through), Mario Delagarde on bass, and Charles Pendergraft on drums. According to Watson, a remark by the unnamed recording engineer inspired the title for the instrumental: "I don't know what you're trying to do, man, but Jesus, man, what is it? Are you some kind of spaceman?"

== Release and reception ==
"Space Guitar" was released by Federal Records in April 1954. Coupled with the Rudy Toombs composition "Half Pint-a-Whiskey", it was issued on both the 78 rpm and 45 rpm record formats, but without A- or B-side designations. Billboard rated "Space Guitar" "77", writing that "This could break a few eardrums if it's played too loud. It's unusual, has a sound and in a way, it moves. Most unusual wax, and an intriguing coupling for the flip."

Similar to Watson's earlier singles, neither song reached the singles charts and the instrumental was not included on any albums. Feeling that Cincinnati, Ohio-based Federal/King label was not promoting his records adequately, he subsequently signed with the Los Angeles-based Modern Records group of labels. There, he adopted the stage name "Johnny 'Guitar' Watson" (inspired by the 1954 Western Johnny Guitar) and in 1955, he enjoyed his first success on the charts with the slower R&B ballad "Those Lonely Nights".

== Legacy ==
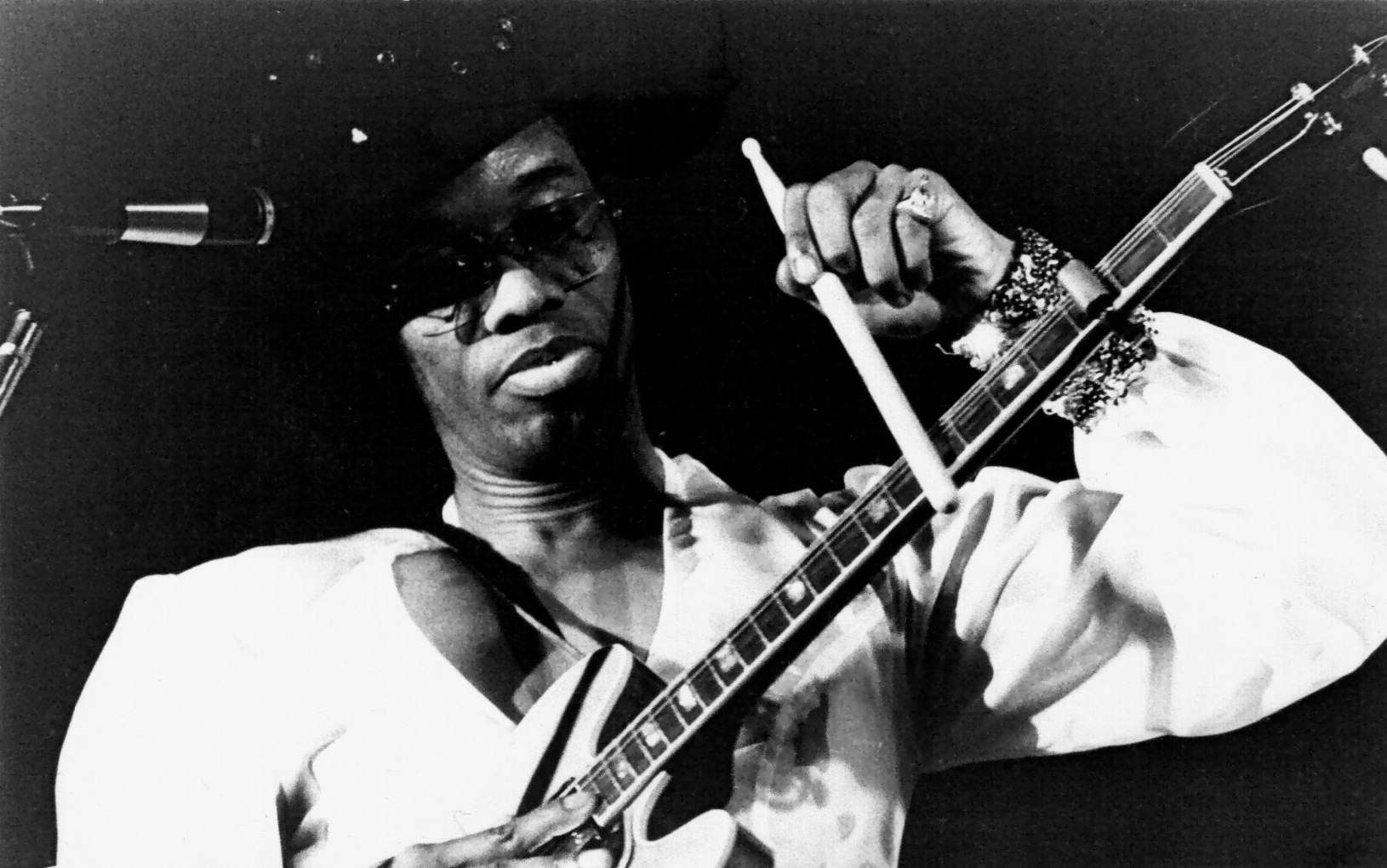
Watson using a drum stick as a slide in 1976

More recently, "Space Guitar" has received critical commentary from a variety of sources. Writing for All Music Guide to the Blues in 1996, critic Richie Unterberger identified the instrumental as "rank[ing] with the greatest achievements of its era [and] presages futuristic effects that rock guitarists still hadn't mastered another 15 years down the line." He later added that it was "one of the relatively obscure classics of the mid-50s." Others have also commented on the forward-looking aspect of the piece: a "tour de force that in terms of both sound and technique was at least a decade ahead of its time" (Batey); and "too freakishly futuristic to sell in its own day" (Birnbaum).

Its more discordant elements have been described as "atonal, dissonant and fractured with reverb, distortion and shredding" (MacDonald); and "[one of the] early rock instrumentals that can be analyzed as examples of 'avant rock' as far as the disconcerting use of dissonance and noise" (Greene). Some writers suggest that "Space Guitar" also features an early use of guitar feedback, although "there is, in fact, no feedback on the record", according to Premier Guitar magazine writer Michael Ross.

Music writer Cub Koda identified Watson as "a futuristic guitarist who influenced Bo Diddley and Ike Turner in the instrument-as-noisemaker department [with] 1954's 'Space Guitar'". According to Frank Zappa biographer John Corcelli, "when he heard Watson's classic instrumental 'Space Guitar' (Federal, 1954), it proved such an epiphany that Zappa adjusted the tone of his guitar to match Watson's when he started playing". Justin Patch wrote that the instrumental "no doubt influenced the sound and imagination of young Jimi Hendrix" and Birnbaum called it "a harbinger of Jimi Hendrix".

"Space Guitar" received more attention when it was later included on several compilation albums of Watson's early singles, such as I Heard That (1985, Charly Records), Gangster of Love (c.1990, Charly), and The Very Best of Johnny "Guitar" Watson (1999, Rhino Entertainment). The various artists collections The King R&B Box Set (1996, King) and Honky Tonk! The King & Federal R&B Instrumentals (2000, Ace Records) also include the piece.

== Personnel ==
- Johnny "Guitar" Watson – electric guitar
- Devonia Williams – piano
- Bill Gaither – tenor sax
- Mario Delagarde – bass
- Charles Pendergraft – drums
- Ralph Bass – producer

== Bibliography ==
- "Reviews of New R&B Records". Billboard. Vol. 66, no. 14. April 3, 1954. ISSN 0006-2510.
- Batey, Rick (2003). The American Blues Guitar: An Illustrated History (1st ed.). Milwaukee, Wisconsin: Hal Leonard. ISBN 0-634-02759-X.
- Birnbaum, Larry (2013). Before Elvis: The Prehistory of Rock 'n' Roll. Lanham, Maryland: Scarecrow Press. ISBN 978-0-8108-8629-2.
- Corcelli, John (2016). Frank Zappa FAQ: All That's Left to Know about the Father of Invention. Milwaukee, Wisconsin: Backbeat Books. ISBN 978-1-61713-603-0.
- Dahl, Bill (December 23, 1994). "Album Persuades 'Guitar' Watson to End Self-imposed Exile". Chicago Tribune. ISSN 1085-6706.
- Eagle, Bob L.; LeBlanc, Eric S. (2013). Blues: A Regional Experience. Santa Barbara, California: ABC-CLIO. ISBN 978-0-313-34424-4.
- Forte, Dan (2003). "The Gnarly Guitar Hall of Fame". In Aldrich, Margret; Dregni, Michael (eds.). This Old Guitar. Stillwater, Minnesota: Voyageur Press. ISBN 0-89658-631-6.
- Fox, John Hartley (2009). King of the Queen City: The Story of King Records. Champaign, Illinois: University of Illinois Press. ISBN 978-0-252-03468-8.
- Greene, Doyle (2016). Rock, Counterculture and the Avant-Garde, 1966–1970. Jefferson, North Carolina: McFarland & Company. ISBN 978-1-4766-6214-5.
- Gregory, Hugh (2003). Roadhouse Blues: Stevie Ray Vaughan and Texas R&B. San Francisco, California: Backbeat Books. ISBN 0-87930-747-1.
- Kennedy, Victor (2013). Strange Brew: Metaphors of Magic and Science in Rock Music. Cambridge Scholars Publishing. ISBN 978-1-4438-4846-6.
- Leigh, Spencer (2016). Love Me Do to Love Me Don't: Beatles on Record. McNidder and Grace. ISBN 978-0-85716-135-2.
- Macdonald, Marie-Paule (2016). Jimi Hendrix: Soundscapes. London: Reaktion Books. ISBN 978-1-78023-542-4.
- Patch, Justin (2020). "Teaching Black Music as a Living Tradition". In Whitt, David (ed.). Popular Music in the Classroom: Essays for Instructors. Jefferson, North Carolina: McFarland & Company. ISBN 978-1-4766-3889-8.
- Ritz, David (1999). The Very Best of Johnny "Guitar" Watson (Compilation booklet). Johnny "Guitar" Watson. Los Angeles: Rhino Entertainment. R2 75702.
- Topping, Ray (1986). 3 Hours Past Midnight (Compilation notes). Johnny "Guitar" Watson. Beverly Hills, California: Flair Records/Virgin Records America. 0777 7 86233 2 8.
- Unterberger, Richie (1996). "Johnny 'Guitar' Watson". In Erlewine, Michael; Bogdanov, Vladimir; Woodstra, Chris; Koda, Cub (eds.). All Music Guide to the Blues. San Francisco: Miller Freeman Books. ISBN 0-87930-424-3.
- Whitburn, Joel (1988). "Johnny 'Guitar' Watson". Top R&B Singles 1942–1988. Menomonee Falls, Wisconsin: Record Research. ISBN 0-89820-068-7.
- Zagorski-Thomas, Simon (2020). "Recorded Music". The Bloomsbury Handbook of Music Production. Bloomsbury Academic. ISBN 978-1-5013-3402-3.
