= Walking on Fire =

Studio album by Kenny Neal
- Released: March 12, 1991
- Studios: King Snake, Sanford, Florida
- Genre: Blues
- Label: Alligator
- Producers: Bob Greenlee, Kenny Neal

Kenny Neal chronology
Devil Child (1989)	Walking on Fire (1991)	Bayou Blood (1992)

Walking on Fire is the third album by the American musician Kenny Neal, released on March 12, 1991. He supported it with a North American tour.

== Production ==
Recorded at King Snake Studios, in Sanford, Florida, the album was produced by Bob Greenlee and Neal. Neal was backed by the Silent Partners rhythm section and Lucky Peterson on keyboards. Fred Wesley and Maceo Parker contributed on horns. Many of the songs were influenced by the Cajun music of Neal's Baton Rouge, Louisiana, youth. "Bad Luck Card" and "Morning After" were inspired by Neal's appearance in the play Mule Bone, written by Langston Hughes and Zora Neale Hurston; played acoustically, the songs are based on poems by Hughes.

== Critical reception ==
Professional ratings
Review scores
Source	Rating
All Music Guide to the Blues	4/5 stars
Chicago Tribune	2.5/4 stars
The Encyclopedia of Popular Music	3/5 stars
The Grove Press Guide to the Blues on CD	4/5 stars
MusicHound Blues: The Essential Album Guide	3/5 stars
The North County Blade-Citizen	3.5/4 stars
The Penguin Guide to Blues Recordings	3/4 stars
The Rolling Stone Jazz & Blues Album Guide	4/5 stars
The Star-Ledger	3.5/4 stars
Windsor Star	A

The Windsor Star said, "This is not a guitar-hero album. All musical elements carry equal weight, making the songs and collective performances the stars." The Chicago Tribune noted that "if there is a problem, it's that Neal still seems sometimes to be doing blues by the numbers". The Los Angeles Times stated that "Neal plays electric blues with the angry-cat passion of the late Freddie King, the economical eloquence of B.B. King, and the slack funk one expects to hear in the blues dens of Chicago."

The New York Times said that Neal "sounds jaunty as he cautions about love's duplicities". The Star-Ledger praised the "raw, fuzzy tones just this side of feedback shriek". The Journal News likened the album to Son Seals's Midnight Son. The North County Blade-Citizen opined that "I Put My Trust in You" "may be the best blues song of the year".

== Track listing ==
No.	Title	Length
1.	"Look But Don't Touch"
2.	"The Truth Hurts"
3.	"I Put My Trust in You"
4.	"Blues Stew"
5.	"Morning After"
6.	"I.O.U."
7.	"My Only Good Thing"
8.	"I Been Missing You, Too"
9.	"Caught in the Jaws of a Vise"
10.	"Things Got to Get Better"
11.	"Walking on Fire"
12.	"Bad Luck Card"
