= Lucky Peterson =

American musician (1964–2020)

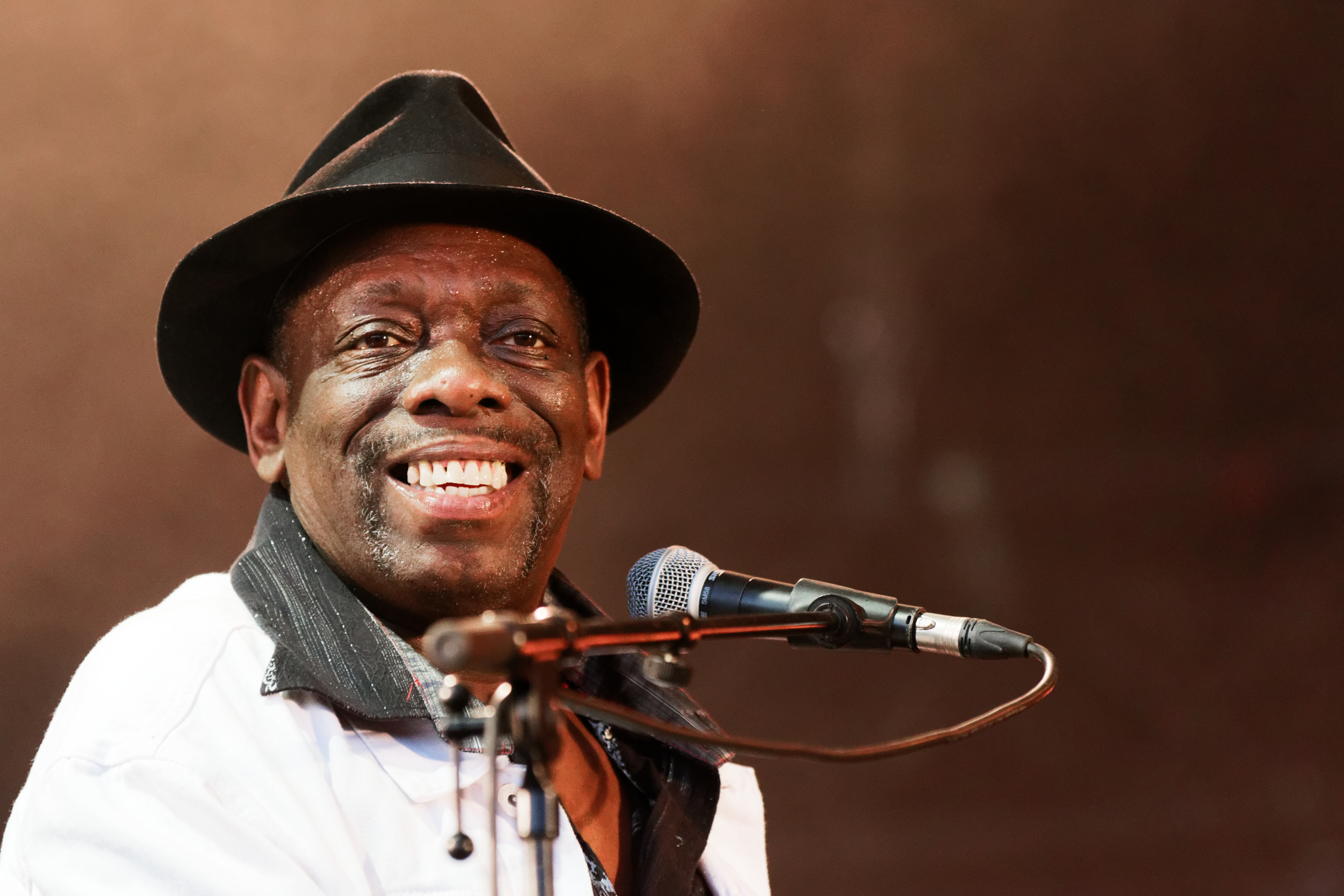
- Peterson at Festival du Bout du Monde in 2016

Background information
- Born: Judge Kenneth Peterson; December 13, 1964; Buffalo, New York, U.S.
- Died: May 17, 2020 (aged 55) Dallas, Texas, U.S.
- Genres: Blues, soul, R&B, gospel, rock and roll
- Occupations: Musician, songwriter
- Instruments: Vocals, guitar, keyboards
- Labels: Disques Dreyfus, Evidence Records, Alligator Records, Verve records, Blue Thumb Records, JSP Records

Judge Kenneth "Lucky" Peterson (December 13, 1964 – May 17, 2020) was an American musician who played contemporary blues, fusing soul, R&B, gospel and rock and roll. He was a vocalist, guitarist and keyboardist. Music journalist Tony Russell, in his book The Blues - From Robert Johnson to Robert Cray has said, "he may be the only blues musician to have had national television exposure in short pants."

== Biography ==
Peterson's father, bluesman James Peterson, owned a nightclub in Buffalo called The Governor's Inn. The club was a regular stop for fellow bluesmen such as Willie Dixon. Dixon saw a five-year-old Lucky Peterson performing at the club and, in Peterson's words, "Took me under his wing." Dixon issued a single of Peterson's recording of "1-2-3-4" on Yambo Records in 1971. Months later, Peterson performed on The Tonight Show, The Ed Sullivan Show and What's My Line?. He also made a guest appearance on Sesame Street. Millions of people watched Peterson sing "1-2-3-4", a cover version of "Please, Please, Please" by James Brown. At the time, Peterson said "his father wrote it". Around this time he recorded his first album, Our Future: 5 Year Old Lucky Peterson, for Today/Perception Records and appeared on the public television show, Soul!.

As a teen, Peterson studied at the Buffalo Academy for Visual and Performing Arts, where he played the French horn with the school symphony. Soon, he was playing backup guitar and keyboards for Etta James, Bobby "Blue" Bland, and Little Milton.

The 1990s were a prolific period for Peterson. Two solo Bob Greenlee produced albums for the Chicago-based Alligator Records (1989's Lucky Strikes!, and the following year's Triple Play) remain his finest recorded offerings. He then released four more for the Verve record label, (I'm Ready, Beyond Cool, Lifetime, and Move). While with Verve, Peterson collaborated with Mavis Staples on a tribute to gospel singer Mahalia Jackson, called Spirituals & Gospel. Peterson played electronic organ behind Staples' singing.

More albums from Peterson came after 2000. He recorded two for Blue Thumb (Lucky Peterson, and Double Dealin' ), and two for Disques Dreyfus (Black Midnight Sun, and You Can Always Turn Around) . In 2007, he released Tête à Tête on JSP Records.

In 2013, the Blackbird Music/55 Arts Club DVD of Live At The 55 Arts Club Berlin was nominated for a Blues Music Award.

Peterson was a favorite of Louisiana bred blues star Kenny Neal, and Peterson's organ and piano work appeared on six of Neal's albums between 1989 and 2010.

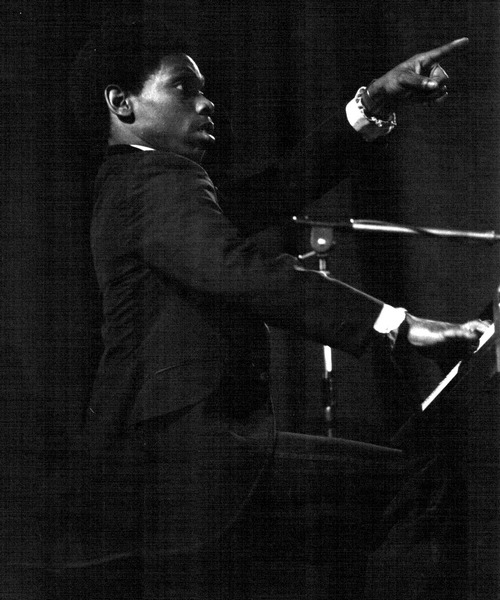
Lucky Peterson in 1984.

== Personal life ==
Peterson lived in Dallas, Texas, and maintained a rigorous tour schedule performing all over the world. He had four children. He died on May 17, 2020, in Dallas at age 55. According to French music critic and journalist Alex Dutihl, Peterson died of a massive brain hemorrhage after falling ill at home.

== Discography ==
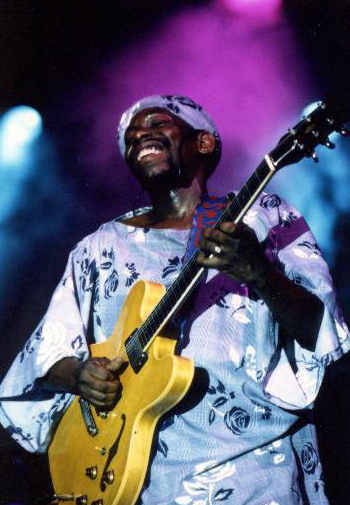
Lucky Peterson at National Blues Festival of Le Creusot in 1994

- 1971: Our Future: 5 Year Old Lucky Peterson – Today TLP-1002
- 1972: The Father, The Son, The Blues (with James Peterson) – Today TLP-1011
- 1984: Ridin' – Evidence 26033; originally issued on Isabel 900.519 [LP] and IS-919.2 [CD].
- 1989: Lucky Strikes! – Alligator 4770
- 1990: Triple Play – Alligator 4789
- 1993: I'm Ready – Verve 517513
- 1993: Beyond Cool – Verve 521147
- 1995: Lifetime – Verve 531202
- 1996: Spirituals & Gospel: Dedicated to Mahalia Jackson (with Mavis Staples) – Verve 533562
- 1997: Move – Verve 537897
- 1999: Lucky Peterson – Blue Thumb/Verve 547433
- 2001: Double Dealin' – Blue Thumb/Verve 549475
- 2003: Black Midnight Sun – Dreyfus 36643
- 2004: If You Can't Fix It (with James Peterson) – JSP 8816
- 2006: Lay My Demons Down (with Tommy McCoy) – Blues Boulevard 250232; originally issued on Green Swamp.
- 2007: Tête à Tête (with Andy Aledort, Larry McCray) – JSP 8805
- 2009: Organ Soul Sessions – Emarcy/Universal (France) 6007 5313798 7 [3-CD set]; also available individually as The Music Is The Magic (6007 5313799 4), Mercy (6007 5313800 7), and Brother Where Are You? (6007 5313801 4).
- 2009: Darling Forever (with Tamara Peterson) – JSP 8814
- 2010: You Can Always Turn Around – Dreyfus 36967
- 2010: Heart of Pain – JSP 8824
- 2011: Every Second a Fool is Born – JSP 8831
- 2012: Live at the 55 Arts Club Berlin (with Tamara Peterson) – Blackbird Music 201209 [2CD]
- 2012: Travelin' Man – JSP 8854
- 2013: Whatever You Say (with Tamara Peterson) – JSP 8848
- 2014: I'm Back Again – Blues Boulevard 250357 (a single disc compilation of the 55 Arts Club set)
- 2014: The Son of a Bluesman – Jazz Village 570035
- 2015: July 28th 2014: Live in Marciac – Jazz Village 570076
- 2016: Long Nights – JSP 3001
- 2017: What Have I Done Wrong: The Best of the JSP Studio Sessions – JSP 3009 (compilation)
- 2017: Tribute to Jimmy Smith (with Archie Shepp) – Jazz Village 570135
- 2019: 50 – Just Warming Up! – Jazz Village 570165

With Carey Bell

- 1995: Deep Down – Alligator 4828

With Abbey Lincoln

- 1995: A Turtle's Dream – Verve 527382

With Kenny Neal

- 1989: Devil Child – Alligator 4774
- 1991: Walking on Fire – Alligator 4795
- 1992: Bayou Blood – Alligator 4809
- 1994: Hoodoo Moon – Alligator 4825
- 2008: Let Life Flow – Blind Pig 5122
- 2010: Hooked on Your Love – Blind Pig 5137

== See also ==
- Long Beach Blues Festival
