= Doug Yoel =

American singer-songwriter

Doug Yoel is an American singer-songwriter, guitarist, record producer, and head of Now Forward Music/Kindred Rhythm, a record label group based in Woodstock, New York. It has managed and marketed a variety of record labels including Dreyfus Jazz USA (Disques Dreyfus), Golden Beams Productions, Groovin' High Records, Thelonious Records, RKM Music and others.
