= Speedway Boulevard (album) =

Studio album by Speedway Boulevard
- Released: 1980
- Studios: K&K Studio City
- Genre: AOR
- Label: Epic
- Producers: Jeffry Katz, Jerry Kasenetz

Speedway Boulevard is the sole self-titled album by the rock band Speedway Boulevard. The album was released in 1980 on Epic Records.

== Background ==
The single had been picked up by a handful of programmers but due to delays with the album's release, they were asked to stop playing the single. When the album was released, the single got picked up again and added to some playlists. By 31 May, the album was added on to the playlist of WSHE-FM in Fort Lauderdale.

According to an ad in the 30 August issue of Billboard, the album was fast becoming a hit on radio stations, WRCN, WQBK, WOUR, WRKK, WQUT, WSHE, WKQQ, WEBN, WXKE, KFMH, KYTX, KLYX, KLBJ, KSHE. KWFM, KPAS, KKDJ, KILO and KZEW. It was a top request at WEBN-FM in Cincinnati and KZEW-FM in Dallas.

== Track listing ==
Track listing adopted from Discogs.

| No. | Title | Lyrics | Length |
|---|---|---|---|
| 1. | "Speedway Boulevard" | | 3:46 |
| 2. | "Chinatown" | Michael Earls | 3:21 |
| 3. | "(Think I Better) Hold On" | Willie Stein | 2:53 |
| 4. | "Dog in the Distance" | | 3:58 |
| 5. | "Out of the Fire" | | 2:58 |
| 6. | "Telephoto Lens" | Glenn Dove | 3:27 |
| 7. | "Prisoner of Time" | | 4:27 |
| 8. | "Money, Money" | Roy Herring Jr. | 3:01 |
| 9. | "(Call My Name) Rock Magic" | Nova Silver | 4:17 |
| 10. | "A Boulevard Nite" | John Marchese | 2:58 |

== Personnel ==
- Roy Herring Jr. - Percussion, piano, vocals
- Jordan Rudess- Keyboards
- Gregg Hoffman- Guitar, vocals
- Dennis Feldman- Bass, vocals
- Glenn Dove- Drums, percussion

== Production ==
- Jeffry Katz and Jerry Kasenetz- Production
- Michael Earls- Engineer
