= I'm Ready (Lucky Peterson album) =

Studio album by Lucky Peterson
- Released: 1993
- Studios: BMG, New York City
- Genre: Blues
- Label: Verve
- Producer: John Snyder

Lucky Peterson chronology
Triple Play (1990)	I'm Ready (1993)	Beyond Cool (1993)

I'm Ready is an album by the American musician Lucky Peterson, released in 1993. It was first released in 1992 in Europe, where it sold more than 40,000 copies. Peterson supported it with a North American tour.

== Production ==
The album, recorded at BMG Studios for $50,000, was produced by John Snyder. Illinois Jacquet contributed on saxophone and Larry McCray played guitar. "Who's Been Talkin'?" is a cover of the Howlin' Wolf song. "Precious Lord Take My Hand" is a version of the Tommy Dorsey composition. "I'm Ready" and "You Shook Me" were written by Willie Dixon.

== Critical reception ==
Professional ratings
Review scores
Source	Rating
All Music Guide to the Blues	3/5 stars
The Buffalo News	4/4 stars
The Encyclopedia of Popular Music	3/5 stars
MusicHound Blues: The Essential Album Guide	2/5 stars
Orlando Sentinel	4/5 stars
The Tampa Tribune	4/4 stars

The Orlando Sentinel concluded, "If Peterson is to take his rightful place among first-rank bluesmen, he needs to break from the crowd and do for the Hammond what such guys as Jimmy Page, Jimi Hendrix and Eric Clapton did for the guitar." The Tampa Tribune praised the "appealingly gruff vocals, lithe, emotion-packed guitar lines and explosive Hammond B-3 organ work". The Buffalo News considered the album to be Peterson's best; DownBeat called it "his most assured".

== Track listing ==
No.	Title	Length
1.	"I'm Ready"
2.	"It Ain't Right"
3.	"You Shook Me"
4.	"Junk Yard"
5.	"Who's Been Talkin'?"
6.	"I Lost Faith Last Night"
7.	"Tribute to the King"
8.	"On the Sea of Love"
9.	"Nothing but Smoke"
10.	"Spankin' Leroy"
11.	"Don't Cloud Up on Me"
12.	"Precious Lord Take My Hand"
