= Old Bottles - New Wine =

Studio album by Ray Anderson
- Released: 1985
- Recorded: June 14 & 15, 1985
- Studio: Classic Sound, NYC
- Genre: Jazz
- Length: 39:21
- Label: Enja; ENJ 4098
- Producer: Ray Anderson

Ray Anderson chronology
Right Down Your Alley (1984)	Old Bottles - New Wine (1985)	It Just So Happens (1987)

Old Bottles - New Wine is an album by trombonist Ray Anderson which was recorded in 1985 and released on the Enja label.

== Reception ==
Professional ratings
Review scores
Source	Rating
Allmusic	4.5/5 stars

The Allmusic review by Scott Yanow stated "Trombonist Ray Anderson, best-known for his avant-garde recordings, surprised many with these explorations of standards. His high-note outbursts are often hilarious, yet on this program he really digs into the material".

== Track listing ==
1. "Love Me or Leave Me" (Walter Donaldson, Gus Kahn) – 4:52
2. "Bohemia After Dark" (Oscar Pettiford) – 5:18
3. "La Rosita" (Allan Stuart, Paul Dupont) – 6:32
4. "Ow!" (Dizzy Gillespie) – 3:38
5. "In a Mellow Tone" (Duke Ellington) – 6:28
6. "Laird Baird" (Charlie Parker) – 5:44
7. "Wine" (Reginald Beam, Avon Long) – 6:49

== Personnel ==
- Ray Anderson – trombone, vocals
- Kenny Barron – piano
- Cecil McBee – bass
- Dannie Richmond – drums
