= Johnny "Guitar" Watson =

American R&B, funk and soul guitarist (1935–1996)

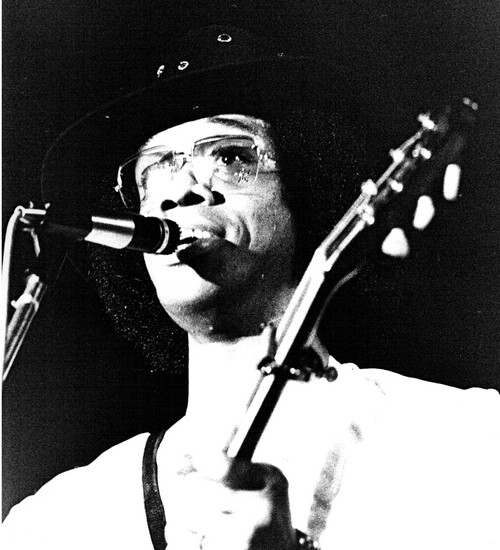
- Watson in 1976

Background information
- Also known as: Young John Watson; Johnny Watson
- Born: John Watson Jr. February 3, 1935; Houston, Texas, U.S.
- Died: May 17, 1996 (aged 61) Yokohama, Japan
- Genres: Rhythm and blues; funk; soul
- Instruments: Guitar; vocals
- Years active: 1952–1996
- Labels: Federal; RPM; Keen; Class; Kent; Arvee; Goth; Escort; King; Highland; Jowat; Okeh; Fantasy; DJM; A&M; Valley Vue; Wilma

John Watson Jr. (February 3, 1935 – May 17, 1996), often known professionally as Johnny "Guitar" Watson, was an American musician. A flamboyant showman and electric guitarist in the style of T-Bone Walker, his recording career spanned 40 years, and encompassed rhythm and blues, funk and soul music.

Watson recorded throughout the 1950s and 1960s with some success. His 1954 instrumental single "Space Guitar" was the first of his recordings to showcase his electric guitar playing. His creative self-reinvention in the 1970s, with funk overtones, saw Watson have hits with "Ain't That a Bitch" and "Superman Lover". His highest-charting single was 1977's "A Real Mother for Ya".

== Early life ==
Watson was born in Houston, Texas. His father John Sr. was a pianist, and taught his son the instrument. But young Watson was immediately attracted to the sound of the guitar, in particular the electric guitar as played by T-Bone Walker and Clarence "Gatemouth" Brown.

His grandfather, a preacher, was also musical. "My grandfather used to sing while he'd play guitar in church, man," Watson reflected many years later. When Johnny was 11, his grandfather offered to give him a guitar if, and only if, the boy did not play any of the "devil's music". His parents separated in 1950, when he was 15. His mother moved to Los Angeles, and took Watson with her.

== Early career ==
In his new city, Watson won several local talent shows. This led to his employment, while still a teenager, with jump blues-style bands such as Chuck Higgins's Mellotones and Amos Milburn. He worked as a vocalist, pianist, and guitarist. He quickly made a name for himself in the African-American juke joints of the West Coast, where he first recorded for Federal Records in 1952. He was billed as Young John Watson until 1954. That year, he saw the Joan Crawford film Johnny Guitar, and a new stage name was born.

On June 7, 1953, Shorty Rogers included Watson as part of his Orchestra to perform at the ninth Cavalcade of Jazz concert, held at Wrigley Field in Los Angeles, California, which was produced by Leon Hefflin, Sr. Also featured that day were Roy Brown and his Orchestra, Don Tosti and His Mexican Jazzmen, Earl Bostic, Nat King Cole, and Louis Armstrong and his All Stars with Velma Middleton.

Watson affected a swaggering, yet humorous personality, indulging a taste for flashy clothes and wild showmanship on stage. His "attacking" style of playing, without a pick, resulted in him often needing to change the strings on his guitar once or twice a show, because he "stressified on them" so much, as he put it. Watson's 1954 instrumental single "Space Guitar" was his first recording to show his "sheer off-the-wall madness" on electric guitar, although it did not chart. According to music historian Larry Birnbaum, for "Space Guitar" he "came into his own as a guitarist". Watson would later influence a subsequent generation of guitarists. His song "Gangster of Love" was first released on Keen Records in 1957. It did not appear in the charts at the time, but was later re-recorded and became a hit in 1978, becoming Watson's "most famous song".

He toured and recorded with his friend Larry Williams, as well as Little Richard, Don and Dewey, the Olympics, Johnny Otis and, in the mid-1970s with David Axelrod. In 1975 he was a guest performer on two tracks (flambe vocals on the out-choruses of "San Ber'dino" and "Andy") on the Frank Zappa album, One Size Fits All. He also played with Herb Alpert and George Duke. But as the popularity of blues declined and the era of soul music dawned in the 1960s, Watson transformed himself from southern blues singer with pompadour into urban soul singer in a pimp hat. His new style was emphatic – wearing gold teeth, broad-brimmed hats, flashy suits, fashionable outsized sunglasses and ostentatious jewelry.

He modified his music accordingly. His albums Ain't That a Bitch (included funk blues singles "Superman Lover" and "I Need It") and A Real Mother For Ya (1977) fused funk and blues. Reviewing A Real Mother for Ya, Robert Christgau wrote in Christgau's Record Guide: Rock Albums of the Seventies (1981): "Watson has been perfecting his own brand of easy-listening funk for years, and this time he's finally gone into the studio with his guitar Freddie and his drummer Emry and a bunch of electric keyboards and come up with a whole album of good stuff. The riff-based tracks go on too long but go down easy and the lyrics have an edge. Granted, Watson can't match George Benson's chops, but this is dance music, chops would just get in the way. And I prefer his Lou-Rawls-without-pipes to Benson's Stevie-Wonder-ditto". The title track, "A Real Mother for Ya", released in 1977, was Watson's highest-charting single.

== Later career ==
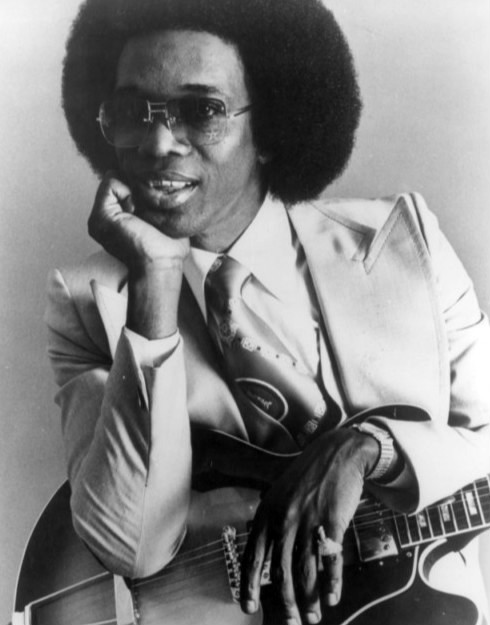
Watson in 1977

Watson's album Love Jones was released in 1980. The death of his friend Larry Williams by gunshot in 1980 and other personal setbacks, led to Watson briefly withdrawing from the spotlight in the 1980s. "I got caught up with the wrong people doing the wrong things", he was quoted as saying by The New York Times.

The release of his album Bow Wow in 1994 brought Watson more visibility and chart success than he had ever known. The album received a Grammy Award nomination. In a 1994 interview with David Ritz for liner notes to The Funk Anthology, Watson was asked if his 1980 song "Telephone Bill" anticipated rap music. "Anticipated?" Watson replied. "I damn well invented it! ... And I wasn't the only one. Talking rhyming lyrics to a groove is something you'd hear in the clubs everywhere from Macon to Memphis. Man, talking has always been the name of the game. When I sing, I'm talking in melody. When I play, I'm talking with my guitar. I may be talking trash, baby, but I'm talking".

In 1995, he was given a Pioneer Award from the Rhythm and Blues Foundation in a presentation and performance ceremony at the Hollywood Palladium. In February 1995, Watson was interviewed by Tomcat Mahoney for his Brooklyn, New York-based blues radio show The Other Half. Watson discussed at length his influences and those he had influenced, referencing Guitar Slim, Jimi Hendrix, Frank Zappa and Stevie Ray Vaughan. He made a special guest appearance on Bo Diddley's 1996 and final studio album, A Man Amongst Men, playing vocoder on the track "I Can't Stand It" and singing on the track "Bo Diddley Is Crazy".

"Johnny was always aware of what was going on around him", recalled Susan Maier Watson (later to become his wife) in an interview printed in the liner notes to the album The Very Best of Johnny 'Guitar' Watson (1999). "He was proud that he could change with the times and not get stuck in the past".

== Death ==
Watson died of a heart attack while on tour on May 17, 1996, collapsing on stage at the Ocean Boulevard Blues Cafe in Yokohama, Japan. At around 7:40, when performing the first verse of "Superman Lover", his first song of the night, he made a gesture as if pushing the microphone stand towards the audience, with his hand on his chest and fell down on his back. He was pronounced dead, at a nearby hospital, less than two hours later. Two days afterward one of Watson's bandmates told the audience, "Johnny once said that if he were to die, he wanted to die on stage". He was 61. Watson left behind two children. His remains were brought home for interment at Forest Lawn Memorial Park Cemetery in Glendale, California, and buried in the Great Mausoleum, Sanctuary of Enduring Honor, Holly Terrace entrance. Since 2022 his son De Jon has been employed with the American professional baseball team the Washington Nationals.

== Influence ==
Watson stated: "I used to play the guitar standing on my hands, I had a 150 foot cord and I could get on top of the auditorium - those things Jimi Hendrix was doing, I started that shit"!

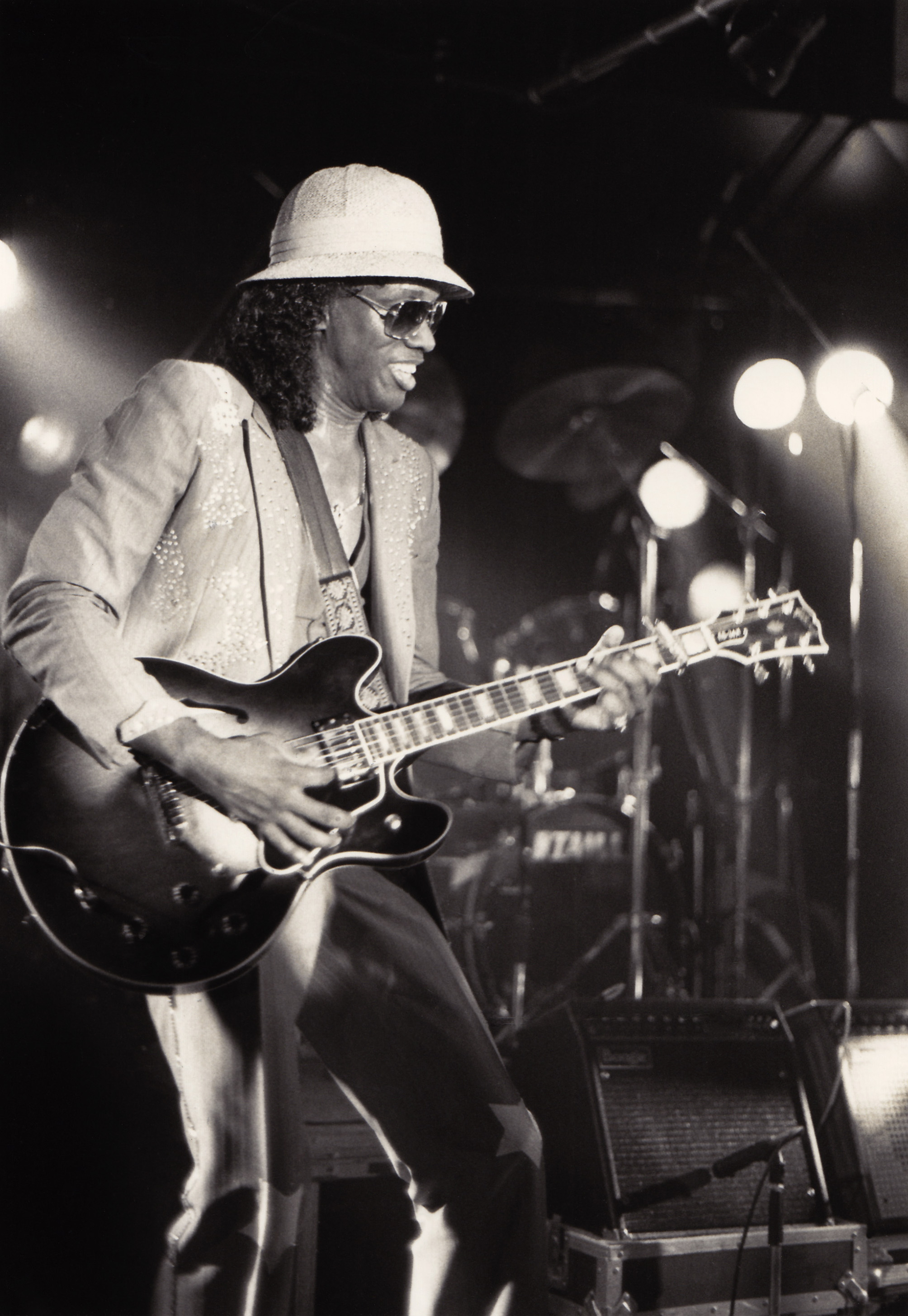
Watson at Bielefeld, Germany, 1987

Frank Zappa stated that "Watson's 1956 song 'Three Hours Past Midnight' inspired me to become a guitarist". Watson contributed to Zappa's albums One Size Fits All (1975), Them or Us (1984), Thing-Fish (1984) and Frank Zappa Meets the Mothers of Prevention (1985). In an August 1979 issue of Musician magazine Zappa said, "To me, it seems incomprehensible that a person could listen to 'Three Hours Past Midnight' by Johnny Guitar Watson and not be moved to get violent... I mean, that's really saying something. Same with the guitar solo on ‘Story Of My Life’ by Guitar Slim. I mean, that stuff used to make me violent. I'd just want to get an icepick and go out and work over the neighborhood!"

Steve Miller recorded Watson's "Gangster of Love" on his 1968 album Sailor. Miller then made a reference to his song title in his 1969 song "Space Cowboy" ("Don't you know that I'm a gangster of love?") from his 1969 album, Brave New World. Miller's 1973 hit song "The Joker" included the lyric "Some call me the gangster of love". Miller had also borrowed the sobriquet for his own "The Gangster Is Back", on his 1971 album Rock Love.

Jimmie Vaughan, brother of Stevie Ray Vaughan, is quoted as saying: "When my brother Stevie and I were growing up in Dallas, we idolized very few guitarists. We were highly selective and highly critical. Johnny 'Guitar' Watson was at the top of the list, along with Freddie, Albert and B. B. King”. Watson influenced Jimi Hendrix, Sly Stone, Etta James, and Stevie Ray Vaughan.

Bobby Womack said: "Music-wise, he (Watson) was the most dangerous gunslinger out there, even when others made a lot of noise in the charts – I'm thinking of Sly Stone or George Clinton".

Etta James stated, in an interview at the 2006 Rochester International Jazz Festival: "Johnny 'Guitar' Watson ... Just one of my favorite singers of all time. I first met him when we were both on the road with Johnny Otis in the '50s, when I was a teenager. We traveled the country in a car together so I would hear him sing every night. His singing style was the one I took on when I was 17 – people used to call me the female Johnny 'Guitar' Watson and him the male Etta James ... He knew what the blues was all about". James is also quoted as saying: "I got everything from Johnny ... He was my main model ... My whole ballad style comes from my imitating Johnny's style... He was the baddest and the best ... Johnny Guitar Watson was not just a guitarist: the man was a master musician. He could call out charts; he could write a beautiful melody or a nasty groove at the drop of a hat; he could lay on the harmonies and he could come up with a whole sound".

Interviewed after his death, blues producer Mike Vernon said of Watson, a friend and colleague: "In the blues world, there are very, very few innovative talents of the size of a Johnny 'Guitar' Watson... John has constantly experimented, he's tried to stay with the times, and created a lot of fantastic music which the anoraks of the blues world tend to pooh-pooh. A talent like John's is very hard to keep in check".

== Partial discography ==
=== Albums ===
Albums rated by All Music Guide to the Blues (excluding bootlegs):

- 1963 Johnny Guitar Watson (King 857)
- 1965 The Blues Soul of Johnny Guitar Watson (Chess 1490)
- 1967 Bad (OKeh 14118)
- 1973 Listen (Fantasy 9437)
- 1975 I Don't Want to Be Alone, Stranger (Fantasy 9484)
- 1976 Ain't That a Bitch (DJM 3)
- 1977 A Real Mother for Ya (DJM 7)
- 1977 Funk Beyond the Call of Duty (DJM 714)
- 1978 Giant (DJM 19)
- 1980 Love Jones (DJM 31)
- 1981 And the Family Clone (DJM 23)
- 1981 That's What Time It Is (A&M 4880)
- 1981 The Very Best of Johnny "Guitar" Watson (DJM 45)
- 1984 Strike on Computers (Valley Vue)
- 1986 3 Hours Past Midnight (Flair, UPC: 07777 86233 28) (compilation)
- 1992 Gonna Hit That Highway: The Complete RPM Recordings (P-Vine 3026/7)
- 1994 Bow Wow (Wilma)
- 1999 Blues Masters: The Very Best of Johnny "Guitar" Watson (Rhino R2-75702)
- 2002 The Essential Johnny "Guitar" Watson (Fuel 2000, UPC: 03020 61230 29)
- 2004 Space Guitar (Varèse Sarabande, UPC: 03020 66611 25)

=== Charting singles ===
Year	Single	US label & no.	Chart Positions		
Year	Single	US label & no.	US Pop	US R&B	UK
1955	"Those Lonely, Lonely Nights"	RPM 436	–	10	–
1962	"Cuttin' In"	King 5579	–	6	–
1967	"Mercy, Mercy, Mercy"; Larry Williams & Johnny Watson	Okeh 7274	96	23	–
1968	"Nobody"; Larry Williams & Johnny Watson with The Kaleidoscope	Okeh 7300	–	40	–
1974	"Like I'm Not Your Man"	Fantasy 721	–	67	–
1975	"I Don't Want to Be a Lone Ranger"	Fantasy 739	99	28	–
1975	"It's Too Late"	Fantasy 752	–	76	–
1976	"I Need It"	DJM 1013	101	40	35
1976	"Superman Lover"	DJM 1019	101	19	–
1977	"A Real Mother for Ya"	DJM 1024	41	5	44
1977	"Lover Jones"	DJM 1029	–	34	–
1978	"Love That Will Not Die"	DJM 1034	–	59	–
1978	"Gangster of Love"	DJM 1101	–	32	–
1979	"What the Hell Is This?"	DJM 1106	–	83	–
1980	"Love Jones"	DJM 1304	–	28	–
1980	"Telephone Bill"	DJM 1305	–	45	–
1982	"The Planet Funk"	A&M 2383	–	62	–
1984	"Strike on Computers"	Valley Vue 769	–	77	–
1994	"Bow Wow"	Wilma 72515	–	89	–
1995	"Hook Me Up"	Wilma 72533	–	48	–
