= Triple Play (Lucky Peterson album) =

Studio album by Lucky Peterson
- Released: 1990
- Studio: Kingsnake
- Genre: Blues
- Label: Alligator
- Producer: Bob Greenlee

Lucky Peterson chronology
Lucky Strikes! (1989)	Triple Play (1990)	I'm Ready (1993)

Triple Play is an album by the American musician Lucky Peterson, released in 1990. It was his second and final album for Alligator Records. Peterson supported the album with a North American tour.

== Production ==
Recorded at Kingsnake Studios, in Sanford, Florida, the album was produced by Bob Greenlee. Peterson sang and played guitar and keyboards; he wrote or cowrote nine of the album's songs. He was backed by the studio's house band. Like many blues musicians of the period, Peterson was influenced by Robert Cray, although he tried to incorporate more of a jazz influence. "I Found a Love" is a cover of the Wilson Pickett song. "Funky Ray" highlights the trombone playing of Ray Anderson.

== Critical reception ==
Professional ratings
Review scores
Source	Rating
AllMusic	4.5/5 stars
Lincoln Journal Star	A−
MusicHound Blues: The Essential Album Guide	3/5 stars
The Penguin Guide to Blues Recordings	3/4 stars
The Tampa Tribune	3.5/4 stars

The Sun-Sentinel wrote that, "with a vision and lyrical outpouring that belies his youth, Peterson scopes the usual blues turf: romance, broken hearts and tough times, in an unusually upbeat, danceable manner." The Kingston Whig-Standard said that Peterson "operates in the same style as Robert Cray, although his voice is a little rougher and gruffer." The Commercial Appeal stated that Peterson "makes modern blues numbers, liberally sprinkling funk, pop and rock."

The Buffalo News concluded that, "despite his instrumental prowess, he still needs a distinct identity." The Leader-Telegram noted that Peterson "can play the blues coarse or fine, sometimes with a little humor mixed in." The Tampa Tribune opined that Peterson "is in the front ranks of American blues/jazz organists." The Liverpool Echo called Peterson "an expressive singer with a superb smokey voice."

== Track listing ==
No.	Title	Length
1.	"Let the Chips Fall Where They May"
2.	"Your Lies"
3.	"Six O'Clock Blues"
4.	"Repo Man"
5.	"I Found a Love"
6.	"Jammin' in the Jungle"
7.	"Locked Out of Love"
8.	"I'm Free"
9.	"Don't Cloud Up on Me"
10.	"Funky Ray"
