= Lovin' the Night Away =

Song by The Dillman Band

from the album Lovin' the Night Away
- A-side: "Lovin the Night Away"
- B-side: "C.O.D."
- Released: 1981
- Composer: Steve Seamans-Patrick Frederick
- Producer: Rick Hall

The Dillman Band singles chronology
| "Border Bound" (1978) | "Lovin' the Night Away" (1981) | "Love Don't Run" (1981) |

"Lovin' the Night Away'" is a 1981 single by The Dillman Band. It proved to be a reasonable hit for them and registered on multiple charts.

== Background ==
"Lovin' the Night Away" was written by Steve Seamans and Patrick Frederick and recorded by The Dillman Band. Backed with Steve Seamans' composition, "C.O.D.", it was released on RCA PB-12206 in April 1981.

This single should not be confused with the song of the same name by female country singer, Noel Haughey who had a minor US Country hit with her composition later that year.

== Reception ==
"Lovin' the Night Away" was reviewed in the 4 April issue of Cash Box where it had a positive reception. There were some aspects of early Eagles sound plus an Ol '55 type of hook. The reviewer finished off with saying that the vocals were marking a group that was on the rise.

The single was reviewed in the 11 April issue of Record World with the attention-grabbing potential of the saxophone and the appeal of the strong vocals being noted.

Along with "Slow Ride" and "Breakdown", "Lovin the Night Away" was a Billboard best album cut from the Lovin' the Night Away album.

== Airplay ==
Following its release as a single, "Lovin' the Night Away" became a Top Add On at radio stations KINT in El Paso, WFLB in Fayetteville, North Carolina, and KFI in Los Angeles.

== Charts ==
=== Billboard Hot 100 ===
"Lovin' the Night Away" debuted at No. 88 on the Billboard Hot 100 Singles chart for the week of 9 May. It peaked at No. 45 on the Hot 100 for the week of 20 June during its nine-week run.

=== Billboard Top 50 Adult Contemporary ===
"Lovin' the Night Away" debuted at No. 43 on the Billboard Adult contemporary chart for the week of 23 May. It peaked at No. 36 for the week of 20 June.

=== Cash Box Top 100 Singles ===
"Lovin' the Night Away" debuted at No. 87 on the Cash Box Top 100 Singles chart for the week of 16 May. It peaked at No. 59 for the week of 13 June.

=== Record World Singles ===
"Lovin' the Night Away" debuted at No. 90 in the Record World Singles chart for the week of 23 May.
