= Love Don't Run (The Dillman Band song) =

Song by The Dillman Band
- A-side: "Love Don't Run"
- B-side: "She's Just a Stranger"
- Released: July 1981
- Composer: Steve Pippin-Larry Keith
- Producer: Rick Hall

The Dillman Band singles chronology
| "Lovin' the Night Away" (1981) | "Love Don't Run" (1981) |

"Love Don't Run" was 1981 single by The Dillman Band. It was a minor hit for them that year, registering on the Record World 101-150 Singles chart.

== Background ==
"Love Don't Run" was written by Steve Pippin and Larry Keith. It was recorded by The Dillman Band. Backed with the Steve Seamans composition, "She's Just a Stranger", it was released on RCA PB-12278 in July 1981.

== Reception ==
"Love Don't Run" was reviewed in the 15 August issue of Record World where it was a Single Pick. It was a positive review, mentioning the merit of the harmony / lead vocals by Steve Seamans and Patrick Fredrick. It was also written that the song's hook and arrangement would win the ears of pop and A/C listeners. It was also reviewed in the 15 August issue of Cash Box. The review was positive with the reviewer finishing off with calling it "Pop powerhouse".

== Charts ==
The single debuted at No. 126 in the Record World 101-150 Singles chart for the week of 12 September. It peaked at No. 118 for the week of 19 September and held that position for another week. It was still in the chart at No. 150 for the week of 7 November.
