= I Don't Want to Be a Lone Ranger =

"I Don't Want to Be a Lone Ranger" is a song written by Johnny "Guitar" Watson. It was a hit for him in 1975 and did quite well on the Billboard Hot Soul Singles chart. It appears on his I Don't Want to Be a Lone Ranger aka I Don't Want to Be Alone, Stranger album. It was also a hit for the group Hidden Strength the following year.

== Johnny "Guitar" Watson version ==
"I Don't Want to Be a Lone Ranger"

Song by Johnny "Guitar" Watson

from the album I Don't Want to Be a Lone Ranger
- A-side: "I Don't Want to Be a Lone Ranger"
- B-side: "You Can Stay but the Noise Must Go"
- Released: 1975
- Length: 3:10
- Composer: Johnny Watson
- Producer: Johnny Watson

=== Background ===
Johnny "Guitar" Watson recorded the song "I Don't Want to Be a Lone Ranger" which was backed with "You Can Stay but the Noise Must Go", and released on Fantasy F-739 in 1975. It was mentioned in the R&B Ingredients section of the Cash Box 5 April issue that Watson's new single "I Don't Want to Be a Lone Ranger" was out and would appear on his upcoming Fantasy Records album.

== Charts ==
=== Billboard Hot Soul Singles ===
"I Don't Want to be a Lone Ranger" made its debut at No. 99 in the Billboard Hot Soul Singles chart for the week of 14 June 1975. It peaked at No. 28.

=== Billboard Hot 100 ===
Johnny "Guitar" Watson's single, "I Don't Want to be a Lone Ranger" debuted at No. 100 in the Billboard Hot 100 singles chart for the week of 4 October 1975. At the time the single was at its seventeenth week in the Hot Soul Singles chart. In its third charting week, the single peaked at No. 99 for the week of 18 October. It held that position for another week.

== Hidden Strength version ==
"I Don't Want to Be a Lone Ranger"

Song by Hidden Strength
- A-side: "I Don't Want to Be a Lone Ranger"
- B-side: "Happy Song"
- Released: 1976
- Length: 3:20
- Label: United Artists Records UA-XW847-Y
- Composer: (J. G. Watson)
- Producer: Denny Diante

USA chronology
| "Hustle on Up (Do the Bump)" (1975) | "I Don't Want to Be a Lone Ranger" (1976) | "You're No. 1" (1985) |

=== Background ===
Hidden Strength released the single, "I Don't Want to Be a Lone Ranger" bw "Happy Song" on United Artists UA-XW847-Y in 1976.

=== Charts ===
==== Billboard Hot Soul Singles ====
"I Don't Want to Be a Lone Ranger" debuted at No. 99 in the Billboard Hot Soul Singles chart for the week of 25 September 1976. At week four, peaked at No. 78 for the week of 16 October and held that position for an additional week.

==== Cash Box Top 100 R&B ====
"I Don't Want to Be a Lone Ranger" debuted at No. 84 in the Cash Box Top 100 R&B chart for the week of 2 October. In its second week in the chart, it peaked at No. 74 for the week of 9 October. It was still at the same position for the week of 16 October.
