= Speedway Boulevard =

American rock band

- Origin: New York City, New York, United States
- Genres: AOR
- Years active: 1980
- Label: Epic
- Spinoff of: Ram Jam
- Past members: Dennis Feldman; Glenn Dove; Gregg Hoffman; Jordan Rudess; Roy Herring

Speedway Boulevard (written as Speedway Blvd.) was an American studio-only rock band, who produced one self-titled studio album for Epic Records in 1980.

== Background ==
The group was put together with session musicians by the bubblegum pop production duo Jeffry Katz and Jerry Kasenetz, who also produced Ram Jam. The band featured Ram Jam live members Dennis Feldman, Glenn Dove, and Gregg Hoffman performing alongside future Dream Theater keyboardist Jordan Rudess, and singer Roy Herring Jr.

Roy Herring co-wrote the hit "Hustle on Up (Do the Bump)" which was a hit for the group Hidden Strength in 1976.

== Career ==
Speedway Blvd released their single, "(Think I Better) Hold On" bw "Speedway Boulevard" on Epic 9-50879 in 1980. It was reviewed in the 10 May issue of Cash Box where it was "One of the Singles to Watch". It was positive with the rock-solid vocals being pushed by reggaeish beat backed with a steel drum-like sound, keyboards and synths being noted. Also mentioned were the unusual arrangements that were said to set the group apart from the usual pop artists. The reviewer finished off with telling the reader to keep an eye out for the group. The single was also reviewed in the 31 May issue of Record World. It was referred to as an "excellent pop-rocker" with Roy Herring Jr.'s urgent vocals and the backing of a muscular rhythm section and bold keyboard lines being mentioned. The album was also added on to the playlist of WSHE-FM in Fort Lauderdale that week.

It was reported by Cash Box in the 2 August 1980 issue that bubble gum moguls, Jerry Kasenetz and Jeff Katz were back with Speedway Boulevard who had been signed to the Epic label.

According to the 9 August issue of Cash Box, the back cover of the group's album, a handful of radio programmers had picked up the single in May. However, they were asked not to play the single due to the album not being available for a couple of months. Then when the album came out, the single was picked up again and was on some playlists.

An ad was run in the 30 August issue of Billboard that the album was fast becoming a hit on stations, WRCN, WQBK, WOUR, WRKK, WQUT, WSHE, WKQQ, WEBN, WXKE, KFMH, KYTX, KLYX, KLBJ, KSHE. KWFM, KPAS, KKDJ, KILO and KZEW. It was a top request at WEBN-FM in Cincinnati and KZEW-FM in Dallas.

The group's new single, "Speedway Boulevard" was reviewed in the 13 September issue of Cash Box where it was one of the "Feature Picks". It was originally the B side for their earlier single. The review was positive with the reviewer calling it a driving track with high octane vocals and the screaming guitar licks and synthesizer to match it. The AOR pop potential was noted.

As shown in the 4 October issue of Billboard, their single "Speedway Boulevard" was a Playlist Top Add on at radio KINT in El Paso.

After their sole self-titled album was a commercial failure, they disbanded. Dennis Feldman later went on to join Balance.

== Later years ==
Roy Herring Jr. would later produce and record under the name of Mr. Roy.

== Members ==
- Dennis Feldman – Bass and vocals
- Glenn Dove – Drums and percussion
- Gregg Hoffman – Guitar and vocals
- Jordan Rudess – Keyboards
- Roy Herring Jr. – Percussion, piano, and vocals

== Discography ==
=== Singles ===
- "(Think I Better) Hold On" / "Speedway Boulevard" - Epic – 9-50879 - 1980
- "Out Of the Fire" / "Speedway Boulevard" - Epic 9-50936 - 1980

=== Album ===
- Speedway Boulevard (1980, Epic)
