= Ingfried Hoffmann =

German jazz musician and composer (born 1935)

- Born: January 30, 1935 (age 91); Szczecin, Poland
- Genres: Jazz; soul jazz; hard bop; easy listening
- Occupations: Musician; composer; arranger
- Instruments: Piano; organ; keyboards; trumpet
- Formerly of: Klaus Doldinger Quartet

Ingfried Hoffmann (born January 30, 1935) is a German jazz organist, pianist, trumpeter, arranger and composer. He has recorded for Columbia, Philips, Polydor, and Verve. In the 1960s, Hoffmann worked extensively with tenor saxophonist Klaus Doldinger, earning the reputation as being one of Europe's best jazz organists. He has also composed music for German television, including music for the German version of Sesame Street and Robbi, Tobbi und das Fliewatüüt.

== Early life and jazz career ==
Hoffmann was born on January 30, 1935 in Szczecin, Poland. His interest in music began when he was a baby, and as early as two years old, he was already completing a daily musical routine of over eight hours. This routine mainly consisted of him listening to his brother Ludwig Hoffmann play the piano, who was a German classical pianist. He was ten years older than Ingfried, and died in 1999. Hoffmann played at his first concert when he was twelve years old, performing The Well-Tempered Clavier by Bach. He studied at the Robert Schumann Conservatory in Düsseldorf, the Cologne University of Music, and the Stern Conservatory in Berlin. Hoffmann also studied musicology, philosophy, and psychology at the University of Cologne. Some of his favorite jazz musicians included Dizzy Gillespie, Bud Powell, Thelonious Monk, and John Coltrane. Hoffmann's earliest recording is a 7-inch single titled Ingfried's Boogie / Bumble Boogie, which he recorded in 1956 with Attila Zoller, Johnny Fischer, and Rudi Sehring. In the same year, he won the title of "best pianist" at the Deutsches Amateur-Jazz-Festival held in Düsseldorf.

In 1952, Hoffmann met German saxophonist Klaus Doldinger, and their friendship developed naturally between them. In the early years of their friendship, the two regularly met to listen to records together, talk about jazz, and to play music together. Doldinger soon started calling him "Friedowitsch" because Hoffmann's mother was Russian. The two performed at the Düsseldorf Amateur-Jazz-Festival in 1955 and 1956 as part of the Birdland Four, the Birdland Five, and Oskar's Trio, three bands led by Doldinger. In Oskar's Trio, Hoffmann played drums whilst Doldinger switched to piano. Hoffmann also played trumpet in Doldinger's Dixieland band The Feetwarmers. In 1962, Hoffmann became a member of the Klaus Doldinger Quartet as the band's Hammond B-3 organist and pianist. Before Doldinger asked him to join his quartet, to which he immediately agreed, Hoffmann had been performing in US Army officers' clubs for three years. The internationally famous band recorded several albums including Jazz Made In Germany, which received international acclaim, and Blues Happening, and performed live frequently throughout the 1960s. In 1963, they performed at the Juan-les-Pins Jazz Festival of that year. Miles Davis, a jazz legend of the time, performed there the same day, and Doldinger with his quartet met him backstage. Hoffmann also performed on several other albums recorded under Doldinger's pseudonym "Paul Nero". Doldinger and Hoffmann performed together at several NDR Jazz Workshops throughout the 1960s, collaborating with musicians such as Albert Mangelsdorff, Ack van Rooyen and Cees See. During the 1960s, Hoffmann earned the reputation as being one of Europe's best jazz organists and pianists, winning several polls in Germany. Hoffmann's reputation as a leading European jazz pianist in the 1960s is shown in Blues Happening, an album recorded in 1968 by the Klaus Doldinger Quartet. The album's liner notes highlight Hoffmann's piano solo in "Tempus Fugit", a composition by Doldinger, describing it as one of his finest performances ever recorded. The Klaus Doldinger Quartet disbanded in 1970, however Hoffmann and Doldinger's friendship lasted for over seventy years. For Doldinger's 70th birthday in May 2006, Hoffmann performed with him once again in various German cities. In 2011, the two performed together with Swedish trombonist Nils Landgren at the Elbjazz Festival of that year. Hoffmann also performed with Doldinger's jazz fusion band Passport at the 9th Hofer Jazztage Festival in 2014.

During the mid-1960s, Hoffmann founded and led his own big band, which was named the Ingfried Hoffmann Big Band. The band's ensemble consisted of musicians such as trumpeter Manfred Schoof, Volker Kriegel, and Helmut Kandlberger. The big band had high profile appearances in 1966 at the 48th NDR Jazz Workshop and in 1967 at the Jazz Am Rhein Festival.

In 1963, Hoffmann released his first solo album titled Hammond Tales, which he recorded with René Thomas, Helmut Kandlberger, and Klaus Weiss. He also released From Twen With Love in 1966, which was recorded with Volker Kriegel, Peter Trunk, Pierre Cavalli, and Rafi Lüderitz. This album, on which Hoffmann only plays organ, interpreted several theme songs from James Bond films, along with a few original compositions by Hoffmann. In 1969, Hoffmann released Swinging Bach-Organ, on which he interpreted several songs by Bach on organ. During the 1960s, he also recorded for Lucky Thompson, Rolf Kühn, and Don Paulin. He founded the band Steel Organ in 1969, which consisted of himself, Helmut Kandlberger, Philip Catherine, and Garcia Morales. The band toured in Europe, South America, and North Africa.

In 1969, Hoffmann recorded two albums under the alias "Memphis Black". He released Soul Club and Soul Cowboy under the name, and he played only the organ on them. He also arranged and composed music for Manfred Krug's album Da Bist Du Ja, which released in 1979.

== Work in television and film ==
In 1970, Hoffmann withdrew from the jazz scene and since then, he has worked in composing and arranging music for television shows and films. One of the first shows Hoffmann wrote music for was Schlager Für Schlappohren, which featured the German children's character Hase Cäsar, and some songs by him were released on an LP of the same name in 1970. In 1968, he appeared on the original show, playing Hammond organ. He also composed the soundtrack for the 1972 television adaption of Robbi, Tobbi und das Fliewatüüt by WDR, which is based on Boy Lornsen's novel of the same name. The show's soundtrack was released on LP and CD in 2002.

Hoffmann became the musical director for Sesamstraße, the German version of Sesame Street, in 1972, and composed music for the show for over 20 years. He composed the show's theme song, "Der, Die, Das", and would often re-arrange or entirely re-compose songs from Sesame Street for the German version because he didn't like most of the original music from the American version. Although he liked some of the American songs, it inspired him to make them even better. Hoffmann's work as the musical director for the show is considered to be the largest composition commission in German television history. Labels such as Poly and Europa released Sesamstraße LPs and CDs with songs composed by Hoffmann featured on the show.

Hoffmann contributed to the soundtrack for the 1966 film Playgirl. The soundtrack was written by Peter Thomas, and Hoffmann played Hammond organ in several songs. The Klaus Doldinger Quartet, in which Hoffmann played organ, also recorded songs for the soundtrack. In 1979, Hoffmann also composed music for Hallo Spencer and wrote the title music for the show. He was the musical editor for Rainer Werner Fassbinder's 1975 film Wie ein Vogel auf dem Draht (Like a Bird on a Wire), where he also made an acting cameo in the film, portraying himself as a barpianist. Hoffmann also arranged and composed music for Impressions de la Haute Mongolie, a 1976 film directed by Salvador Dalí and José Montes-Baquer. In 2017, 41 years after the film's release, Hoffmann was featured in a documentary titled Raymond Roussel: Le Jour de Gloire, which was about the film and Raymond Roussel, the film's subject. He also composed the music for Kümo Henriette, a German television show, working on it from 1979 until the show's end in 1982.

Hoffmann composed the music for the feature film La Ferdinanda, which was directed by Rebecca Horn in 1981. He has also made musical contributions to Die Sendung mit der Maus and wrote the music for Der verdammte Krieg, which was a 1991 television documentary series directed by Guido Knopp. In 1990, he composed the music for Der Hammermörder, which is a film that is loosely based on the true story of serial killer Norbert Poehlke. In 1996, Hoffmann wrote the music for Das Phantom Der Oper, a German musical based on the novel The Phantom of the Opera, with lyrics written by Karl Heinz Freynik. He has additionally produced music for product advertisements such as Mercedes-Benz adverts.

== Later life ==
Later in his life, Hoffmann got involved in composing music for operas aimed at children. He composed the music for Vom Fischer und seiner Frau, which premiered at the Cologne Opera House in 2010. In 2016, Hoffmann also composed the music for children's opera Die Heinzelmännchen zu Köln, which also premiered at the Cologne Opera House, celebrating 20 years of the Cologne Children's Opera. He described his music for it as a "cheerful jazz opera for children", with a small jazz ensemble performing the songs.

Hoffmann is married to Gisela Reschke and resides in a villa, which is situated directly on the Rhine in Rodenkirchen, Cologne as of 2011. He has his own recording studio there and a personal library filled with first editions, which he collects as a hobby. In recent years, Hoffmann has largely withdrawn from performing publicly, with his most recently documented appearance being at the 9th Hofer Jazztage Festival in 2014 with Doldinger's band Passport.

== Sources ==
- Jürgen Wölfer (2008). Jazz in Deutschland – Das Lexikon. Alle Musiker und Plattenfirmen von 1920 bis heute. Höfen an der Enz: Hannibal Verlag. ISBN 978-3-85445-274-4.
