= Klaus Doldinger Quartet =

German jazz band led by Klaus Doldinger

- Origin: Düsseldorf, Germany
- Genres: Jazz; hard bop; Latin jazz; bebop
- Years active: 1962-1970
- Past members: Klaus Doldinger; Ingfried Hoffmann; Helmut Kandlberger; Klaus Weiss; Peter Trunk; Cees See

The Klaus Doldinger Quartet was a jazz band led by German saxophonist Klaus Doldinger in the 1960s. It originated in Düsseldorf and was founded in 1962. The band released several albums throughout the 1960s in different styles of jazz, including hard bop, Latin jazz, and bebop. They performed live frequently, averaging around 100 gigs a year, and toured several continents such as South America, Asia, and Europe, receiving international acclaim. The band's ensemble occasionally rotated and featured several famous European musicians such as Klaus Weiss, Peter Trunk, and Ingfried Hoffmann, who worked extensively with Doldinger and fostered a long friendship with him.

== Origins ==
Since the 1950s, German saxophonist Klaus Doldinger had led multiple bands, most notably The Feetwarmers and Oscar's Trio. After an inspiring trip to the United States in the early-1960s, Doldinger was influenced by American jazz and wanted to pursue his passion for modern jazz. This future path enabled him to craft his own musical language in jazz; he wanted to develop his own unique sound without simply copying his role models out of the respect he had for them. Doldinger wanted to lead his own quartet that he could use to create his own style of modern jazz based on his influence from America whilst grounding it in European traditions and culture.

Doldinger decided that Oscar's Trio was not suitable for this new path due to it being too musically limited for what he wanted to achieve. To obtain his fourth musician, he contacted German jazz pianist and Hammond organist Ingfried Hoffmann, who had been performing in US Army officers' club for three years and was good friends with Doldinger, and asked if he wanted to join his quartet, to which Hoffmann immediately agreed. Hoffmann's compliance pleased Doldinger due to his musicality, knowledge, and open-mindedness. He believed that there was "no better organist in Europe" for the music he wanted to make, and that the Klaus Doldinger Quartet was "born with his acceptance". The quartet's first ensemble featured musicians from Düsseldorf, including bassist Helmut Kandlberger and drummer Klaus Weiss, and it was agreed that the band would run under Doldinger's name as he was in charge of the musical direction and that the band was his idea.

== Recording for Philips ==
In October 1962, the Klaus Doldinger Quartet performed at the Deutsches Amateur-Jazz-Festival held in Düsseldorf. The same night, record producer Siegfried Loch, who worked for Philips Records at the time, approached Doldinger after the concert to enquire about recording an album with him, an offer that Doldinger accepted. Before they could record an LP, Loch was advised by his boss to record a 7-inch EP with Bossa Nova tracks first. Doldinger was initially reluctant as his quartet mainly played modern jazz, however after some persuasion from Loch, they recorded the EP in December 1962, which was subsequently titled Bossa Nova. This release also featured guitarist Bert Helsing and percussionist Rolf Ahrens.

Their first LP was recorded in January 1963 and titled Jazz Made In Germany by Loch, who felt that it was important to convey that, as a German jazz band, they wrote and performed their own music and had a unique independence in this form, and to appeal to international audiences. This album was released in October of the same year as part of Philips' Twen series, and was also the first German jazz album to be released internationally, including countries such as the Netherlands, America, and the United Kingdom. Jazz Made In Germany received international acclaim and led to international tours for the quartet around Europe. Notably, they performed at the Juan-les-Pins Jazz Festival in July 1963, where they met jazz legend Miles Davis, who was performing there with Herbie Hancock, Ron Carter, and Tony Williams on the same day. Doldinger and his band thought of Davis as a "kind of God" to them. In September, the band provided musical accompaniment for the German-language production of George Gershwin's Girl Crazy.

In December 1963, the Doldinger Quartet held two concerts at the Blue Note jazz club in Berlin. Both concerts were recorded and released as a live album titled Live At Blue Note Berlin, which also featured bassist Peter Trunk in a duet between him and Doldinger. Kandlberger left the band in 1964, with Trunk replacing him as the quartet's new bassist. This year brought more concerts in many countries including Italy, Finland, Sweden, Denmark, and Norway. After these European concerts, there were tours of the Middle East and North Africa scheduled with the Goethe-Institut, which included countries such as Egypt, Morocco, and Turkey.

For the spring and summer of 1965, a three-month-long tour of South America was prepared for the quartet and commissioned by the Goethe-Institut. Before the tour, they recorded the album Doldinger In Süd Amerika (Doldinger In South America) in March of that year, which featured Hungarian guitarist Attila Zoller. The band had another change in lineup earlier in the year, with Weiss leaving and being replaced by Dutch drummer Cees See for the album's recording. Their performances in Brazil were successful for them as audiences were crowded, and one of their performances was televised on Brazilian television, which reached around half a million viewers. However, the tour had been disrupted on numerous occasions. Their Buenos Aires performance was delayed by the manager, resulting in a lack of audience members. They also formally requested not to have the performance recorded, however the sound engineer retaliated by disrupting the concert with electronic interference from his systems. Doldinger's wallet and soprano saxophone reeds were stolen from his dressing room during their performance in Santa Fe. Rumours were also spread that the band members were taking drugs, however formal preparations before the tour proved that they were not drug addicts. Their flight to Santiago was delayed due to poor weather conditions, however another date was arranged for them to perform there. The tour had become dangerous when they arrived in Colombia. Due to high crime and unrest in the country at the time, their first concert had to be cancelled, however the second one took place with difficulty as audience members had to pass through high security. Their next concert in Medellín was cancelled, and the entire city center was closed off, resulting in the band members not being able to leave or enter the hotel they were staying in. After performing in Guatemala, Panama, and Mexico City, the quartet also performed in New Orleans. In June 1965, they came back to Düsseldorf after 37 concerts across South America, Central America, and the United States, with Doldinger In Süd Amerika releasing in time for their return. Later that year in November, there were more concerts planned in Ireland and in London at Ronnie Scott's Jazz Club, which was once again financed by the Goethe-Institut. Due to strict requirements for foreign musicians at the time, such as only being able to perform if there were British musicians in the band, this was the only instance the band ever performed in England.

In April 1966, the quartet provided recordings for Will Tremper's Playgirl, a film released in the same year with a soundtrack written by Peter Thomas. Rafi Lüderitz briefly replaced See as the drummer for these sessions. After some performances in France, Doldinger's final Philips album was recorded in March 1967 and titled Doldinger Goes On. This album was recorded with the usual quartet lineup of Doldinger, Hoffmann, Trunk, and See, with the addition of guitarist Volker Kriegel, percussionist Fats Sadi, and the return of Kandlberger, this time also playing bass guitar. After its release, readers of Twen magazine voted Doldinger as "Musician of the Year", the Klaus Doldinger Quartet as "Band of the Year", and Doldinger In Süd Amerika as "Record of the Year". The quartet also performed at the Jazz Am Rhein Festival in September 1967.

== Transition to Liberty Records and final performances ==
Loch resigned from Philips and took on a job to establish a German branch of Liberty Records that was offered by Alvin Bennett, and Doldinger was signed by Loch as his first exclusive artist at the label. In August 1968, the band recorded their first album for Liberty, which was titled Blues Happening. Kandlberger returned to the quartet and replaced Trunk as their latest bassist in time to record the album. It was released in Germany and the United States, and was a step towards freer forms of music for the band, whilst being more compositionally mature than Doldinger's earlier work, containing hard bop and modal jazz compositions by him. After studying the music of John Coltrane, Archie Shepp, and Frank Zappa, the album contained a fusion of swing, blues, and free jazz, and had fully arranged and composed instrumentals and denser textures than his earlier improvisations, resulting in an intimate interplay between the quartet's members. This is praised in the album's liner notes, along with a number of dynamic highlights in the title song. The album also features four additional musicians including guitarist Joe Quick, bassist Lothar Meid, and drummers Kurt Bong and Wolfgang Paap, along with a horn section at the beginning of the title song.

A year earlier in May 1967, a television debate aired on WDR comparing "pop jazz" and "free jazz", as the latter was developing and becoming more popular over the course of time. The program featured a panel of seven experts and critics on jazz, including Felix Schmidt, Werner Burkhardt, Manfred Miller, Doldinger's producer Loch, and others. Siegfried Schmidt-Joos, who occasionally wrote liner notes for Doldinger's albums, was on the panel and also hosted the show. Doldinger and his quartet represented pop jazz, whilst saxophonist Peter Brötzmann represented free jazz with his trio of himself, bassist Peter Kowald, and drummer Aldo Romano. The two saxophonists were supposed to perform together at the end of the show, however after tense discussions, they refused due to the environment becoming too heated. Most of the panel were reportedly skeptical of the style Brötzmann represented, associating it with having a lack of instrumental technique, with Loch labelling one of his previous performances that he had attended as "amusing". Other members of the panel also described Brötzmann's music as a "musical traffic accident" and "sound carnage". Manfred Miller, another member of the panel, defended Brötzmann by attributing his style to having a "real-time realisation of form" in his music and mentioned its emotional core. He also stated the general artistic merits of free jazz and insisted that conventional jazz metrics were irrelevant to his music. A year later in March 1968, Doldinger performed Blues Happening at the German Jazz Festival held in Frankfurt, where Brötzmann also performed with his song Machine Gun.

In January 1969, the quartet embarked on a tour across Asia, performing in countries such as Pakistan, Turkey, Thailand, Singapore, Sri Lanka, Hong Kong, and India to a total of 45,000 people. The tour lasted until the end of February and their ensemble remained the same as the one that recorded Blues Happening, including Doldinger, Hoffmann, Kandlberger, and See. They primarily performed songs from Blues Happening, which were played in an avant-garde style. Each night, they were developed further, performing them with a bold use of dissonance, occasionally overwhelming audiences. An audience member stated after a performance in Mumbai that she "actually came to hear music", however she felt that it was "pure noise". After a concert in Tehran, the press reported that the performance had been "equally wonderful, exciting, and confusing". The sense of confusion may have been caused by sound issues and unsuitable equipment for most of the tour.

After their Asian tour, the band had a tour of Germany scheduled, which was soon folllowed by studio recordings for their final album. This album, which was recorded for Liberty but also part of Philips' Twen series, was recorded in June 1969 and titled The Ambassador by Loch, reflecting Doldinger's self-image as an international ambassador for German jazz. The Ambassador was influenced by Doldinger's impressions of India, North Africa, and Brazil, containing Latin, raga, and jazz fusion elements. The album was also integral to Doldinger's increasing openness to rock and pop. It was a double LP, with one disc containing recordings from Trixi Studio in Munich, where Blues Happening was also recorded, and a second disc with live recordings from the Domicile jazz club, also located in Munich. One of the live recordings is a Doldinger composition titled Sahara, which uses elements from his song Blues Happening and has a mixture of African music and moderate free jazz, making a big impression on Doldinger listeners at the time. The song would later evolve into Sahara Sketches, being performed by Doldinger's jazz fusion band Passport regularly.

The last recorded performance of the Klaus Doldinger Quartet was at the German Jazz Festival in Frankfurt. Doldinger played there with Hoffmann, Kandlberger, and See in March 1970, covering The Windmills of Your Mind and performing Sahara. It was recorded and released on LP and CD.

== Discography ==
=== Studio albums ===
- Bossa Nova (7" EP) - Klaus Doldinger Quartett + Afro Cuban, 1962, Philips, 423451 PE
- Solar / I Didn't Know What Time It Was / Woody'n You (7" EP) - Klaus Doldinger Quartett, 1963, Fontana, E 76810
- Jazz Made In Germany - Klaus Doldinger Quartett, 1963, Philips, 48024 L
- Live At Blue Note Berlin - Klaus Doldinger Quartett, 1963, Philips, 48067 L
- Jazz Makers: Delilah / Blues For George (7" EP) - Klaus Doldinger Quartett, 1964, Philips, 423465
- Doldinger In Süd Amerika - Klaus Doldinger Quartett + Attila Zoller, 1965, Philips, 843728 PY
- Doldinger Goes On - Klaus Doldinger Septett, 1967, Philips, 843966 PY
- Blues Happening - Klaus Doldinger Quartett, 1968, Liberty, LBS 83167 I
- The Ambassador - Klaus Doldinger Quartett, 1969, Liberty, LBS 83317/18 X

=== Live releases ===
- Die Deutschen All Stars - Various Artists - Klaus Doldinger Quartett, 1963, Columbia, C 83 418
- Born Free - Various Artists - K. Doldinger Quartett, 1970, Scout, S 12
- Modern At The German Jazz Festival 1966 - Various Artists - Klaus Doldinger Quartett + Rolf Kühn, 2015, Be! Jazz, Be! Jazz 6084/85
- ...From The German Jazz Festival 1964 - Various Artists - Klaus Doldinger Quartett + Inge Brandenburg + Rolf Kühn, 2016, be-bop, 6250 CD
- Jazz Antibes 1963: Festival International Du Jazz Juan-Les-Pins - Various Artists - Klaus Doldinger Quartett, 2016, bebop, 6254 CD
- Jazz Am Rhein - Various Artists - Klaus Doldinger Quartett, 2017, Be! Jazz, Be! Jazz 6262-67 CD

=== Soundtracks ===
- Playgirl - Various Artists - Klaus Doldinger Quartett, 1966, Philips, 843903 PY
