= Weltflug.tv – The Gyrocopter World Tour =

- Genre: documentary
- Created by: Andreas Stuetz; Melanie Stuetz
- Country of origin: Germany
- Original languages: English and German
- No. of episodes: 5

Production
- Production locations: cross-frontier GmbH; Munich, Germany
- Camera setup: Film; multi-camera
- Running time: 205 minutes

Weltflug.tv – The Gyrocopter World Tour is the title of a five-part documentary series by Melanie & Andreas Stuetz and of "Weltflug – Two high-flyers on five continents" by Andreas Stuetz.

== Content ==
Blu-ray, DVD and book document the flight that started in April 2009 by Melanie and Andreas Stuetz and led in 18 months and 100,000 miles of travel around the world. Highlights of the route were:

The Way of St. James (Europe), the Okavango Delta, the Kalahari and the Namib Desert (South Africa, Botswana, Namibia), the Outback and the Tasman Sea (Australia), Tauranga via Wellington to Queenstown, New Zealand, Seattle over San Francisco to Los Angeles (USA), Buenos Aires over Iguazu Falls to Rio de Janeiro (South America).

The idea for the real adventure comes from the book "Robbi, Tobbi und das Fliewatüüt" of Boy Lornsen, a famous children's author.

Melanie dreamed as a little girl in the GDR about boundless travel. Andreas devoured as a young boy in West Germany, the children's TV series "Robbi, Tobbi und das Fliewatüüt". His childhood dream was to be like Tobbi make a trip around the world with a vehicle that flies ("Flie"), lands on water ("wa") and drives like a car ("tuut). Later in the James Bond film "You Only Live Twice", the couple saw a plane similar to the Fliewatüüt. Sean Connery triumphed in Japan with a kind of bonsai helicopter, called gyrocopter or autogyro "Little Nellie", against four combat helicopters. The autogyro looked indeed like a small helicopter, but started and landed like an airplane. Still before they have kids and would support their dreams, Melanie and Andreas learned to fly. They acquired their own autogyro and launched the first World Tour with a gyrocopter at all, with stages in Europe, Africa, Australia & New Zealand, the USA and South America.

Until they had started this project with an autogyro, a microlight sport vehicle built for short range, it was believed to be an impossible undertaking.

Melanie and Andreas used the travel to support and draw attention to the work of the children's charity Terre des hommes. They visited children in projects of Terre des Hommes in South Africa, India, Thailand, Peru and Bolivia, and asked children and adults about their childhood dreams. The couple met in the interviews with the caregivers and the children and learned that childhood dreams can be an important key for the development in life. Children who pursue a dream for their lives, have a strong motivation to overcome opposition and adversity. With the realization of their world tour Melanie and Andreas encourage children and adults across borders to pursue their dreams. A portion of proceeds from the book and movie will go directly to help the children of Terre des Hommes.

== Filming ==
Melanie and Andreas Stuetz were equipped with two HD cameras. With the cameras they filmed both the flying scenes in the cockpit but were also filmed from the ground and during the flight from other aircraft.

=== DVD / Blu-ray ===
The DVD – and Blu-ray edition appeared 2012. On five DVDs and Blu-rays five episodes are included. The individual episodes are titled and describe the following travel sections

- Episode 1: Europe
- Episode 2: Africa
- Episode 3: Australia & New Zealand
- Episode 4: USA
- Episode 5: South America

The footage was dubbed in German and English. Subtitles in German and English. The German TV stations ARD (broadcaster), ZDF and RTL Television showed parts of Weltflug.tv footage in the editorial coverage of the adventure.

== Autogyro ==
Andreas and Melanie flew initially a gyroplane type of Xenon Celier Aviation.

After passing the Europe and Africa Adventure the German market leader for gyroplanes, the company AutoGyro from Hildesheim decided to support the adventure with MTOsport gyroplanes in Australia, New Zealand, the US and South America.

== Challenges ==
=== Europe ===
In France, they saved themselves with a dramatic flight during a storm just into a strictly forbidden military restriction zone. When they tried to cross the Pyrenees between France and Spain, they threatened to crash into a cloud-covered massif. At the last moment a gap opened in the clouds and they were able to fly over the mountains. On the Atlantic coast, they barely escaped a storm system in which they were trapped.

=== Africa ===
Shortly before the start of the flight in Africa the Gyroplane was badly damaged by another pilot at an air show. When Melanie and Andreas were forced to land on a gravel road in the Namib Desert, a special force of the Namibian military was alerted. Within 15 minutes, the two found themselves surrounded by numerous armed guards. Two hours prior to the end the prerotator shaft of the rotor broke. They could prerotate the rotor by hand and made it to the final destination Springs in Johannesburg.

=== Australia and New Zealand ===
The rejection of the European Medical certificate and the lack of insurance of the gyroplane seemed to let fail the adventure for weeks. During this time they lived in a small disused caravan in the middle of the Australian bush. In close proximity with kangaroos, koalas and cockatoos they experienced their Australian Dreamtime. They managed to solve formal problems and finally took off. The flight went through the eucalyptus forests across the Dividing Range from the east coast and then flying low directly above the pounding surf along the coast towards Cairns . Because of an approaching cyclone, the two finally were stopped by storms and heavy rain on the coast and could only continue their trip in New Zealand. There the pilot couple flew in a formation with five local gyroplanes and 60 others, some unique historic aircraft at the "New Zealand Air Safari". Over 5,000 kilometers their autogyro tour took them in the north, then to the extreme south of "The Lord of the Rings" islands and back. In their approach to the international airport Wellington they temporarily lost control of the autogyro in heavy turbulence. The autogyro reared up like a rowing boat in rough seas. Despite the extreme conditions they kept their nerve and landed safely in the capital of New Zealand. To get from the North to the South Island, they had to fly over the Cook Strait, 30 kilometers travel across open sea. In one of the last landing at Omaka New Zealand a squall tilted the autogyro.

=== United States ===
In a dramatic bad weather flight they managed to get through the foothills of the Cascades to the Pacific coast, at Gold Beach. They followed the coastline of Oregon southward to the Golden Gate Bridge of San Francisco in California. The airport Half Moon Bay near San Francisco, was completely covered with clouds. In their type of aircraft you lose orientation and control of the aircraft in clouds within seconds. However, they had hardly any fuel left and alternative airfields were no longer within reach. So they decided to do a bold approach to the airfield of Half Moon Bay, which was completely under clouds. In San Francisco, they met with Karl-Heinz Johannsmeier, who had made it from a Stasi prisoner in East Germany to a multi-millionaire in the United States. After they had interviewed him at his estate about his success and his dreams, they continued their adventures. They flew over the dream factory Hollywood to their destination near Los Angeles.

=== South America ===
After visiting seven different authorities in Buenos Aires and with a personal letter from the President of the Argentine Civil Aviation Authority Melanie and Andreas succeeded to create the preconditions for a launch in Argentina. A mature 70-year-old scrap truck transported the autogyro to the airport and promptly got stuck in the mud just before reaching the hangar. In a complex operation the truck dinosaur could be freed with an additional four-wheel drive SUV and a tractor. The sport pilots took off and eventually flew along the Río Uruguay. Due to a singularity of the earth magnetic field both compass and the GPS were disturbed and they temporarily lost orientation during the flight. They made it yet to the Iguazú Falls and filmed the largest waterfalls in the world, both from the air and from the ground. On their connecting flight, they were caught in a storm over the jungle, but reached the coast of the South Atlantic in Brazil. On the last leg of their Weltflug adventure, the couple flew over the beaches of Copacabana (Rio de Janeiro) and Ipanema. Five times they circled around the Christ the Redeemer (statue) statue of Rio de Janeiro, at the same time the climax and conclusion of the two-year adventure.
