= Passport (Passport album) =

Studio album by Passport
- Released: 1971
- Genre: Jazz-rock; jazz fusion
- Length: 42:16
- Label: Atlantic
- Producer: Klaus Doldinger

Passport chronology
Passport (1971)	Second Passport (1972)

Passport is the debut studio album by German jazz fusion band Passport. Released by Atlantic Records in 1971, the album was produced by Klaus Doldinger. The album is sometimes referred to as Doldinger.

== Background ==
Klaus Doldinger, having already been an established musician as a saxophonist and prolific composer in West Germany, had released rock-influenced albums with his group Doldinger's Motherhood, between 1969 and 1970 with drummers Udo Lindenberg, who sang for their albums, and Keith Forsey. Doldinger then renamed Doldinger's Motherhood to Passport the following year, and, with the assistance of Siegfried "Siggi" Loch, made a record deal with Kinney National Company (later known as WEA) under the Atlantic Records label. For the album Passport, it marked a turning point for Doldinger and Lindenberg: while a member of Passport, Lindenberg became acquainted with the music business and would later start his solo career, whereas Doldinger gradually turned toward a more melodic and instrumental approach to his music while incorporating newer instruments such as the Moog synthesizer. The debut album was recorded at Munich, West Germany, in autumn 1971.

== Release and reception ==
Professional ratings
Review scores
Source	Rating
AllMusic	4.5/5 stars

Passport was released by Atlantic Records in West Germany in 1971. According to Siegfried Loch, the album was only released in the country because he could not secure a distribution deal for the United States at the time, although he would later be successful in doing so for the future albums from Doldinger and Passport. The album was promoted with an instrumental song "Schirokko", released as a single, as well as a television appearance the following year in the television series Beat-Club. Neither the album or single charted, but the album was reportedly to have sold well to gain popularity and notice among the German jazz scene in Munich. The lineup composed of Lindenberg, Kübler, Jackson, and Meid, would disband in 1972, shortly after recording Passport since Doldinger reportedly wanted to take the band into a jazz-influenced direction, whereas the other members desired for a more rock-influenced direction.

Another album with the same name as the debut album was released by Reprise Records in the United States in 1973, containing all songs from Passport's second album Second Passport, with two songs "Lemuria's Dance" and "Madhouse Jam" replacing "Registration O". Writing for DownBeat magazine, in September 1973, Herb Nolan and Jim Schaffer were receptive to the American edition of Passport and called it "an unprecedented example" of musicians making "today's contemporary music" and gave the album five stars.

In 1996, Steven and Alan Freeman gave a retrospective evaluation in their book The Crack in the Cosmic Egg, and described the original edition of the debut album as "powerful fusion", noting musician Jimmy Jackson's "haunting keyboards", the "strong melodic context" and "powerful arrangements" in the album.

The original edition of the album Passport was reissued and included as part of their Original Album Series boxed set by Warner Music Germany in 2011.

== Track listing ==
All songs written by Klaus Doldinger.

Side one
No.	Title	Length
1.	"Uranus"	6:35
2.	"Schirokko"	5:44
3.	"Hexensabbat"	4:27
4.	"Nostalgia"	5:13

Side two
No.	Title	Length
1.	"Lemuria's Dance"	4:37
2.	"Continuation"	9:53
3.	"Madhouse Jam"	5:47

== Personnel ==
Personnel per Siegfried Loch and Atlantic Records.

Passport

- Klaus Doldinger – tenor, alto, soprano saxophone, Moog synthesizer, electric piano
- Udo Lindenberg – drums, percussion
- Olaf Kübler – tenor saxophone, flute
- Lothar Meid – electric bass
- Jimmy Jackson – organ
- Paul Vincent – guitar (uncredited)

Production

- Klaus Doldinger – producer
- Petrus Wandrey (Wandrey's Studio) – art direction
