= Passport (disambiguation) =

A passport is a travel document.

- Internal passport – Document issued to control domestic travel and internal migration

(The) Passport may also refer to:

== Automobiles ==
- Passport (automobile dealership), a Canadian car dealership owned by General Motors
- Passport Optima, a rebranded version of the automobile Opel Kadett
- Honda Passport, a sport utility vehicle

== Entertainment ==
- Passport (1961 film), a Bollywood film
- Passport (1990 film), Russian film
- Passport (2012 film), Indian Bengali film
- The Passport (2018 film), an Iranian short film
- Passport (2024 film), Sri Lankan film
- The Passport (2025 film), an Albanian romantic drama film
- Passport (band), a German jazz fusion band
  - Passport (Passport album), a 1971 studio album by German jazz fusion band Passport
- Passport (Nana Mouskouri album), a 1976 compilation album by Greek singer Nana Mouskouri
- Passport (Pascal & Pearce album), a 2011 album by Pascal & Pearce
- "Passport" (instrumental), by Charlie Parker (1950)
- Passport Records, a U.S.-based independent record label that existed between 1973 and 1988
- "Passport", a song by Circa Waves from their 2019 album What's It Like Over There?
- "Passport", an unreleased song by SZA
- "Passports", a song by Reks from his 2012 album REBELutionary
- The Passport (novel), a novel by Herta Müller

== Other ==
- Passport (company), a mobile payment platform
- Passport, Illinois, an unincorporated community in Richland County, Illinois
- Passport Inns, a brand of Hospitality International
- BlackBerry Passport, a BlackBerry smartphone
- My Passport, the brand name of a series of external hard drives made by Western Digital
- Passport, a summary of qualifications, as in European Language Passport
- Microsoft account, a single sign-on Microsoft user account previously known as Microsoft Passport and .NET Passport

== See also ==
- Henley Passport Index, a global ranking of countries according to the travel freedom of holders of their ordinary (non-diplomatic) passport holders
