= René Thomas (guitarist) =

Belgian jazz guitarist (1926–1975)

- Born: 25 February 1926; Liège, Belgium
- Died: 3 January 1975 (aged 48) Santander, Spain
- Genre: Jazz
- Occupation: Musician
- Instrument: Guitar
- Years active: 1940s–1975
- Labels: Vogue, Barclay, Polydor, Jazzland, RCA

René Thomas (25 February 1926 – 3 January 1975) was a Belgian jazz guitarist.

In the early 1950s, he moved to Paris, France, and became part of the modern jazz scene, playing in the style of Jimmy Raney. He spent brief periods in the United States from 1958 to 1962. Back in Europe, he toured and recorded with Chet Baker, Bobby Jaspar, Kenny Clarke, Eddy Louiss, Stan Getz, Lucky Thompson, Sonny Criss, Jacques Pelzer, Lou Bennett, Charles "Lolo" Bellonzi, and Ingfried Hoffmann.

Thomas died of a heart attack in Santander, Spain, at the age of 48 on 3 January 1975.

== Discography ==
=== As leader ===
- Rene Thomas et Son Quintette (Vogue, 1955)
- Guitar Groove (Jazzland, 1960)
- Thomas/Jaspar Quintet (RCA Victor, 1962)
- Meeting Mister Thomas (Barclay, 1963)
- Eddy Louiss-Kenny Clarke-René Thomas (Cy, 1973)
- TPL (Thomas Pelzer Limited) (Vogel, 1974)
- Blue Note Paris 1964 (Royal Jazz, 1990)
- Guitar Genius (AMC, 1991)
- Guitar Genius Vol. 2 (AMC, 1992)
- Hommage a...Rene Thomas (Timeless, 1994)

=== As sideman ===
- Bud Powell, Parisian Thoroughfares (1957-61) (Pablo, released 2003)
- Sonny Rollins, Sonny Rollins and the Big Brass (MetroJazz, 1958)
- Toshiko Akiyoshi, United Notions (MetroJazz, 1958)
- Jack Sels, Jack Sels (1961) (Best Seller, released 1978)
- Chet Baker, Chet Is Back! (RCA Victor, 1962)
- Bobby Jaspar, The Bobby Jaspar Quartet at Ronnie Scott's 1962 (Mole, released 1986)
- John Lewis, A Milanese Story (Atlantic, 1962)
- Sonny Criss, Mr Blues Pour Flirter (Brunswick, 1963)
- Ingfried Hoffmann, Hammond Tales (Philips, 1963)
- Lou Bennett, Enfin! (RCA Victor, 1963)
- Lou Bennett, Echoes and Rhythms of My Church (Bel Air, 1964)
- Lou Bennett, Pentacostal [sic?] Feeling (Philips, 1966)
- Daniel Humair, Surrounded 1964/87 (Blue Flame, released 1987)
- Lucky Thompson, A Lucky Songbook in Europe (MPS, 1969)
- Stan Getz, Dynasty (Verve, 1971)
