= Liebling Kreuzberg =

German television series

- Created by: Jurek Becker
- Starring: Manfred Krug, Corinna Genest, Anja Franke
- Country of origin: Germany
- No. of seasons: 5
- No. of episodes: 58

Production
- Running time: 45 min

Original release
- Network: Das Erste
- Release: 1986 – 1998

Liebling Kreuzberg is a television series on German TV network ARD, which was first aired in five seasons with a total of 58 episodes from 1986 to 1998.

The scripts of seasons one through three and five were written by Jurek Becker, who tailor-made the role of idiosyncratic Berlin Kreuzberg attorney Robert Liebling for his friend Manfred Krug, the fourth season was written by Ulrich Plenzdorf. The series was directed by Heinz Schirk (first season), Werner Masten (second to fourth season) and Vera Loebner (fifth season). It was produced by SFB, NDR and WDR. The music of the first season was composed by Hans-Martin Majewski, in the later seasons by Klaus Doldinger.

== Content and Characters ==
The eponymous main character, Robert Liebling (born June 12, 1939) is an attorney and notary, who has his office in Berlin's Kreuzberg district. In the first four seasons he has a three-day beard, wears a hat, drives a motorcycle (a Honda first, then a BMW) and convertibles (4th season, a Mercedes-Benz W124 series, season 5, a Mercedes-Benz W111), smokes cigar and consumes götterspeise in large amounts, which his secretaries Paula (Corinna Genest) and Senta (Anja Franke) always have to keep in stock. Sometimes Liebling has several girlfriends simultaneously, which often leads to trouble. While he does these things quite easily, he reacted with jealousy when one of his liaisons moved into the vicinity of infidelity.

As a matter of principle, Liebling only takes cases that interest him. In the first episode of the 1st Season, he explains that he has sold a real estate business inherited from his father and is now, in his capacity as a notary, documenting any resulting sales contracts. This secures him a degree of financial independence, so that he can afford to avoid work if possible. Much rather he goes for a walk during the day along the river Spree or sleeps in his office. Much of the remaining work he delegates to his associates. In the first three seasons, this is Michael Kausch in the role of Dr. Giselmund Arnold, later Jenny Gröllmann as Isolde Isenthal "Issi" and finally Stefan Reck as Dr. Bruno Pelzer. They are often idealistic, while at the same time more conventional and serve as antagonists of pragmatic, but unconventional Liebling. Most funny dialogues in the series result from this contrast. However, the contrast is often only a seeming one, because Liebling—although a cynic—has also idealistic traits.

The individual episodes usually deal with minor disputes, which often confront the layman with unexpected legal facts. In the parallel storyline favorite girlfriends are a supporting subject. In the early episodes, the relationships change most rapidly, while the suspense in later episodes is generated by the professional or personal background of the women. In the 2nd and 3rd Season it is the attorney Rosemarie Monk (Diana Körner), in the 4th Season Lena Lewandowsky (Isa Jank), in the 5th Season the married Lola Kornhaus (Monika Woytowicz) and finally Miriam Breslauer (Johanna Liebeneiner). Another important role in the private setting of the story is his chaotic and chronically broke daughter Sarah Liebling (Roswitha Schreiner), who in the final season—initially in secret—is the girlfriend of Dr. Bruno Pelzer.

== Other actors ==
- Corinna Genest: Paula Fink (Season 1–3, 5)
- Anja Franke: Senta Kurzweg (Season 1–5)
- Michael Kausch: Gieselmund Arnol Season (1–3)
- Stefan Reck: Bruno Pelzer (Season 5)
- Diana Körner: Rosemarie Monk (Season 2–4)
- Jenny Gröllmann: Isolde Isenthal (Season 4)
- Friedrich-Karl Praetorius: Clerk Mr. Wittlich (Season 2)
- Adrian Schröck: Robertschen Liebling (Season 4–5)
- Brigitte Grothum: Erika Liebling (Season 1)
- Jochen Schroeder: Bob (Season 5)
- Joachim Kemmer: Dr. Klinda (Season 4)
- Karin Hardt: Mother of Robert Liebling (Season 2)
- Hans Nitschke: Mohrenhaupt, public prosecutor (Seasons 3–4)
- Monika Woytowicz: Lola Kornhaus
- Johanna Liebeneiner: Miriam Breslauer
- Liesa Schober: Barbara Isenthal (Season 4)
- Peter Schiff: Lawyer Wolter (Season 1–5)
- Rolf Zacher: Willi Gumpert/Willi Rodegast (Season 2–4)

== Seasons ==
1. 1985/1986
2. 1987/1988
3. 1989/1990
4. 1993/1994
5. 1997/1998

== Episode list ==
1st season

1. Der neue Mann
2. Ein dringender Fall
3. Der Beschützer
4. Doppeleinsatz
5. Kleine Fische
6. Der Retter

2nd season

1. Taschenpfändung
2. Glück kommt, Glück geht
3. Die Staatsanwältin
4. Der Besuch
5. Die Abkassierer
6. Teilerfolg
7. Zweimal Entlassung
8. Hausbesuche
9. Das eigene Geld
10. Rom und zurück
11. Alles auf Bewährung
12. Die Fehler der anderen
13. Ehrengericht

3rd season

1. Ein Bruch nach dem anderen
2. Blumen für den Rechtsanwalt
3. Selbsthilfe
4. Ausnahmsweise umsonst
5. Die Freiheit der Kunst
6. Anwälte unter sich
7. Die Tochter der Freundin des Vaters
8. Jede Menge Abschied

4th season

1. Einmal Anwalt – immer Anwalt
2. Berlin ist ein Dorf
3. Rote Ohren
4. Lernet, ihr Richter auf Erden
5. Des Menschen Wille
6. Speckkartoffeln mit Pflaumen
7. Widerstand und so weiter
8. Spatz in der Hand
9. Wer schmeißt denn da mit Lehm
10. Kein bißchen schwanger
11. Ein bißchen Gewalt
12. Ladendiebstahl lohnt sich
13. Weiche Landung

5th season

1. Lieblings neues Glück
2. Unter uns Machos
3. Der Verbieter
4. Wissen ist Macht
5. Der Bauch eines Richters
6. Schmerzensgeld
7. Ausländersachen
8. Paradies mit Folgen
9. Eine nette Intrige
10. Der Krawattenmann
11. Die Sache Anja Clemens
12. Paula, komm wieder
13. Besorgte Väter
14. Teure Zeugen
15. Der Killer
16. Hirngespinste
17. Schwer verdientes Geld
18. Der einzige Ehrliche
