= Liebeneiner =

Liebeneiner is a surname. Notable people with the surname include:

- Johanna Liebeneiner (born 1945), German actress; daughter of Wolfgang Liebeneiner
- Wolfgang Liebeneiner (1905–1987), German actor, film director and theatre director
