= Stefan Reck =

German television actor (born 1954)

- Born: Stephan Reck; 1954 (age 71–72); Lippstadt, West Germany
- Occupation: Actor
- Website: official website

Stefan Reck (born 1954, in Lippstadt) is a German television actor. Currently he lives in Berlin.

His acting training stretching among others graduated from the "Hochschule für Musik und darstellende Kunst" in Hamburg. He played among others in Fabrik der Offiziere, and episodes of the series The Old Fox and Derrick. His most famous roles are Alles außer Mord and that of lawyer Bruno Pelzer in Liebling Kreuzberg. In addition to roles in film and television, Stefan Reck was also on the stage in the role of Frédéric Chopin in the Sommer in Nohant. Reck lives in Berlin.

He was awarded the Goldener Löwe in 1998 for Liebling Kreuzberg.

== Filmography ==
- 1983: Class Enemy
- 1985: The Old Fox: Der Leibwächter
- 1989: Fabrik der Offiziere
- 1989: Löwengrube
- 1990: Derrick: Beziehung abgebrochen
- 1993: Morlock
- 1993: The Great Bellheim
- 1996: The Shadow Man
- 1997–1998: Liebling Kreuzberg
- 1997: Busenfreunde
- 1998: Busenfreunde 2
- 1999: The Beast in the Lake
- 2000: Taboo
- 2000: Stubbe – Von Fall zu Fall: Baby-Deal
- 2007–2008: Familie Sonnenfeld, as Thorsten
