= Cees See =

Dutch jazz drummer

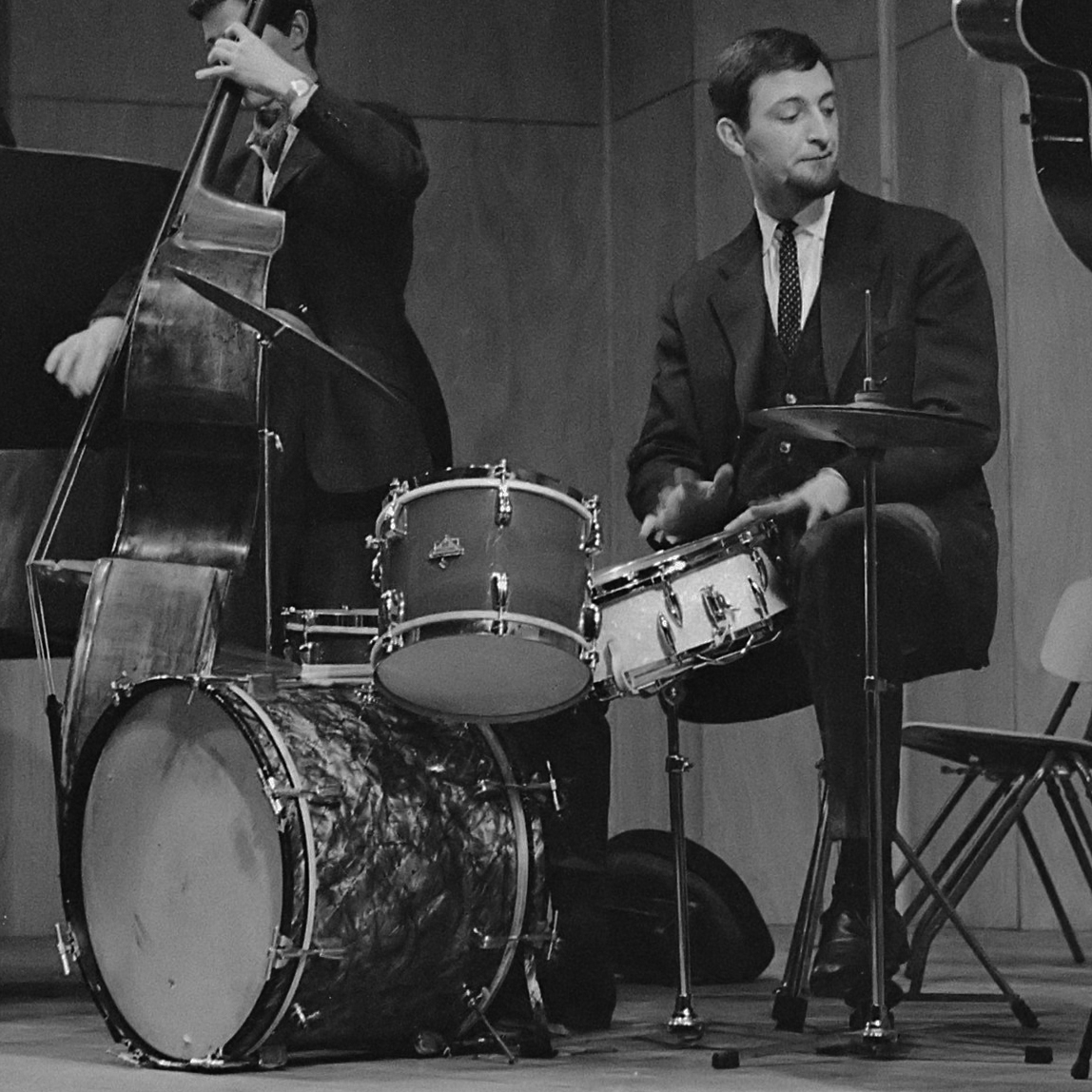
Cees See (performing in 1960)

Cees See (January 5, 1934, Amsterdam - December 9, 1985, The Hague) was a Dutch jazz drummer.

See worked in the 1950s with Freddy Logan and Jack Sels, and in the early 1960s with Rolf Kühn, Pim Jacobs, and Herman Schoonderwalt. He also played with an ensemble formed for Sender Freies Berlin, whose members included Herb Geller and Jerry van Rooyen. In the second half of the 1960s he played with Teddy Wilson, Klaus Doldinger, Volker Kriegel, Dusko Goykovich, Nathan Davis, and Jan Hammer. He was a member of the New Jazz Trio with Manfred Schoof and Peter Trunk in 1970–1972, and in the early 1970s also continued to work with Kriegel and Goykovich, as well as with Wolfgang Dauner and Chris Hinze.
