= Alles außer Mord =

German crime television series

- Also known as: Everything but Murder
- Created by: Michael Baier
- Starring: Dieter Landuris; Stefan Reck; Gustav Peter Wöhler; Lene Beyer; Petra Kleinert; Peter Fitz
- Theme music composer: Klaus Doldinger
- Country of origin: Germany
- No. of seasons: 3
- No. of episodes: 14

Original release
- Network: ProSieben
- Release: 10 April 1994

Alles außer Mord (Everything but Murder) was a German crime television series that aired on the TV station ProSieben between 1993 and 1995. 14 episodes were produced. The series features various criminal cases led by private investigator Uli Fichte (Dieter Landuris), who tells his clients that he will take any case, except murder. The series was created by Michael Baier.

The unstable PI Fichte lives in an old industrial building in the port of Hamburg and drives an old Mercedes-Benz. His social entourage is made up of psychologist Dr. Frieder Tamm, his wife Melanie, his two sons, and the journalist Horst Weinstein. In spite of his personal motto, Fichte always ends up dealing with murder cases, even though at the beginning of each episode, these cases appear innocent and straightforward.

The series received low ratings during its original run despite positive reviews, and ProSieben produced few episodes. Between 1993 and 1995, three seasons with a combined total of 14 episodes were made. The series was cancelled in 1996.

A boxset with all 14 episodes on 7 DVDs was published in 2008.

== See also ==
- List of German television series
