= Lou Bennett (American musician) =

American jazz organist (1926–1997)

Lou Bennett (May 18, 1926, Philadelphia – February 10, 1997, Paris) was an American jazz organist.

Bennett first played bebop on piano, but started playing organ in 1956 after hearing Jimmy Smith. Bennett toured the U.S. with an organ trio between 1957 and 1959, and then moved to Paris in 1960. There he recorded and performed at the Blue Note with Jimmy Gourley and Kenny Clarke (as well as Rene Thomas); he returned to America only once, for the 1964 Newport Jazz Festival. He also recorded in the 1960s with Philip Catherine, Shirley Bunnie Foy and Franco Manzecchi. In the 1980s he played in his own quintet with Gerard Badini, among others. During this period he also toured extensively throughout Spain, including, Almeria, Barcelona, La Coruna, Segovia, Salamanca and Madrid.

== Discography ==
=== As leader ===
- Amen (RCA Victor, 1960)
- Dansez et Rêvez (RCA Victor, 1960)
- Enfin! (RCA Victor, 1963)
- Echoes and Rhythms of My Church (Bel Air [France], 1964)
- Lou Bennett et Son Quintette avec Kenny Clarke [EP] (Bel Air, 1964)
- Pentacostal [sic?] Feeling (Philips, 1966; Gitanes, 2001)
- Núria Feliu, Lou Bennett: I Els Seus Amics (Edigsa [Spain], 1966)
- La Vil Seducción (Sonoplay [Spain], 1968; Fonomusic [Spain], 1997)
- Plays For Clem (Clem [Germany], 1971)
- Live at Club Saint-Germain (Vogue, 1980)
- Blue Lou's Blues (Caravage [France], 1986)
- Now Hear My Meaning (Mas [Spain], 1993)

=== As sideman ===
- Eddie "Lockjaw" Davis, That's All (Music For Pleasure [France], 1983; EPM Musique, 1990)
- Johnny Griffin, Body and Soul (Moon [Italy], 1967 [rel. 1989])
- Brew Moore, Live in Europe 1961 (Sonorama [Germany], 2015)
- Jack Sels, Sax Appeal (Relax [Netherlands], 1966)
- Ximo Tebar, Hello Mr. Bennett (DM/Difusió Mediterranea, 1993; WEA, 1997)
- Ximo Tebar, Son Mediterraneo (WEA, 1995)
- Rene Thomas, Meeting Mister Thomas (Barclay, 1963; Gitanes, 2001)
- Leo Wright, It's All Wright (BASF, 1973)
