= Klaus Doldinger =

German saxophonist and composer (1936–2025)

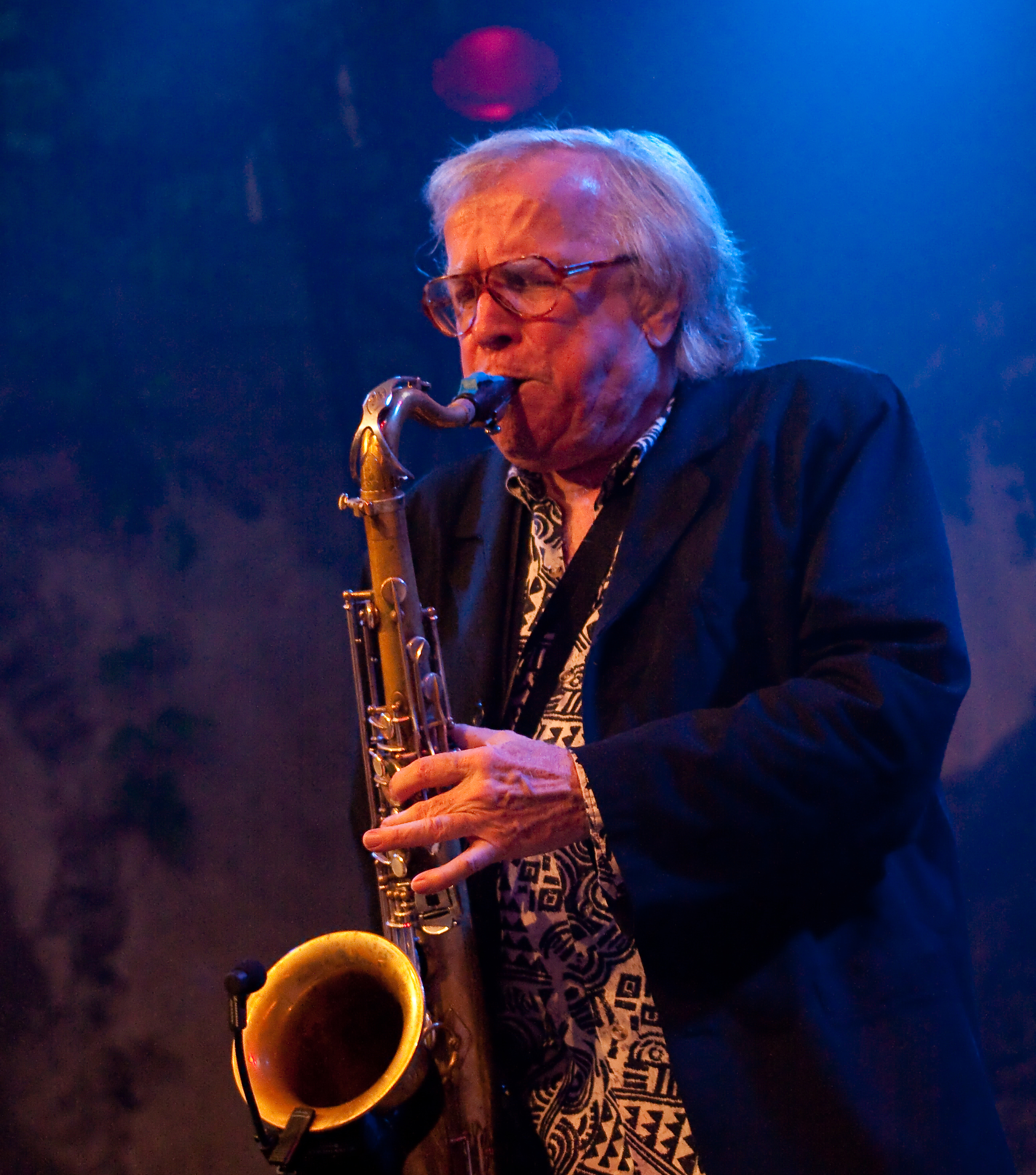
- Doldinger performing in 2006

Background information
- Born: Klaus Erich Dieter Doldinger; 12 May 1936; Berlin, Germany
- Died: 16 October 2025 (aged 89) Icking, Germany
- Genres: Jazz; jazz fusion; Latin jazz
- Occupations: Musician; composer
- Instruments: Saxophone; clarinet; keyboards; synthesizer
- Formerly of: Klaus Doldinger Quartet; Passport
- Website: klausdoldinger.de

Klaus Doldinger (German: [klaʊs ˈdɔldɪŋɐ]; 12 May 1936 – 16 October 2025) was a German saxophonist known for his work in jazz and as a film music composer. He founded the group Passport in 1971; they played in different formations for decades and became successful internationally. Doldinger composed several filmscores, including Wolfgang Petersen's Das Boot (1981) and The NeverEnding Story (1984). He is known for writing the theme music of Tatort, running on television since 1970.

== Life and career ==
=== Early life and work ===
Doldinger was born on 12 May 1936 in Berlin. The family moved to Vienna when he was age four; his mother moved with him and his brother to Schrobenhausen, Bavaria, where he heard jazz first at age nine, played by American soldiers. His father was already living then in Düsseldorf, where the family was reunited. Doldinger attended school there and was admitted to the Düsseldorf Conservatory in 1947 for piano and from 1952 clarinet. He heard his first jazz concert there with the Lionel Hampton big band in 1952.

After his Abitur in 1957 he studied musicology and Tonmeister at the Düsseldorf Conservatory. In addition to his studies, he played soprano saxophone in Düsseldorf bars, sometimes together with Günter Grass, and played clarinet with the Dixieland band The Feetwarmers, recording with them in 1955, two years before completing school. Later that year, he founded Oscar's Trio, modeled after Oscar Peterson's work. They won the first prize, the Coup Sidney Bechet, at the Brussels jazz festival, and their "Muss i' denn zum Städtele hinaus" earned them an invitation to play in the United States in 1960. He was awarded honorary citizenship of New Orleans.

=== Klaus Doldinger Quartet ===
After being influenced from America and wanting to build his own musical language using modern jazz, he founded the Klaus Doldinger Quartet in 1962 with bassist Helmut Kandlberger, drummer Klaus Weiss, and organist Ingfried Hoffmann, who was a close working partner and friend of Doldinger for decades. He thought that there was "no better organist in Europe" than Hoffmann for the music that Doldinger wanted to make and that the band was "born with his acceptence". They released their first LP in 1963, Jazz Made In Germany, with producer Siggi Loch, who became a friend for life. The album won international recognition for jazz from Germany that was not only a copy of American models. The album Doldinger Live at Blue Note Berlin was recorded live in the Blue Note club in Berlin the same year. Doldinger's quartet released several more albums which incorporated Latin jazz, hard bop, and free jazz such as Doldinger In Süd Amerika and Blues Happening until their disbandment in 1970. Musicians such as Cees See and Peter Trunk also played in the band. The band was also praised for their intimate interplay. They regularly performed live and toured continents such as Asia, Europe, and South America, averaging around 100 gigs a year. During the 1960s, he played tenor saxophone, while also visiting American jazz musicians and beat groups like Ian and the Zodiacs, and making recordings. In part to his first album, he travelled to around 40 countries as an "ambassador of German jazz" for the Goethe-Institut. He was inspired especially by music from Morocco and Brazil. He founded a band Motherhood in 1969, making two albums of fusion jazz, again with Loch. His music was influenced by jazz, blues and rock, spiced by Latin American rhythms and experimental electronic sounds.

=== Passport ===
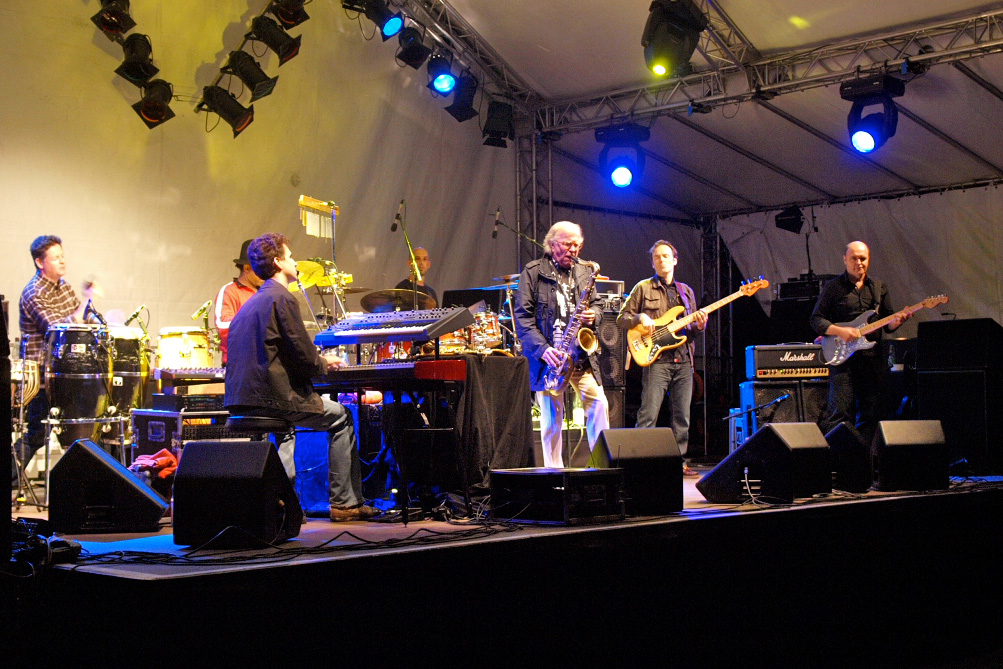
Doldinger's band Passport in 2008

Doldinger's recurring jazz project Passport, started in 1971 (then called "Klaus Doldinger's Passport"). Udo Lindenberg was percussionist in the first formation. Their second album, Second Passport, was a success in the charts in 1973. The group was selected as artists of the year in the category Ensemble Pop National of the Deutscher Schallplattenpreis in both 1976 and 1981. In terms of its influence it was sometimes called the European version of Weather Report.

The second setup of Passport included percussionist Curt Kress, Kristian Schultze for keyboards and bassist Wolfgang Schmid, successful on major tours to the US. Doldinger found promising young talents such as drummers Wolfgang Haffner and Andi Haberl; at various times members of Passport included Peter O'Mara (guitar), Roberto Di Gioia (keyboards), Patrick Scales (bass, since 1994), Ernst Ströer (percussion, since 1989), Christian Lettner (drums, since 2000), Michael Hornek (keyboard since 2009), Biboul Darouiche (percussion, since 1995) and others. Guests include Brian Auger (1973), Johnny Griffin (1973) and Pete York (1973). The band recorded more than 30 albums, and Doldinger composed over 2000 pieces. In jubilee performances, Doldinger played with members from "generations" of the group. In 2021 they made a record presenting 50 years of the band's history, The First 50 Years Of Passport.

=== Composition ===
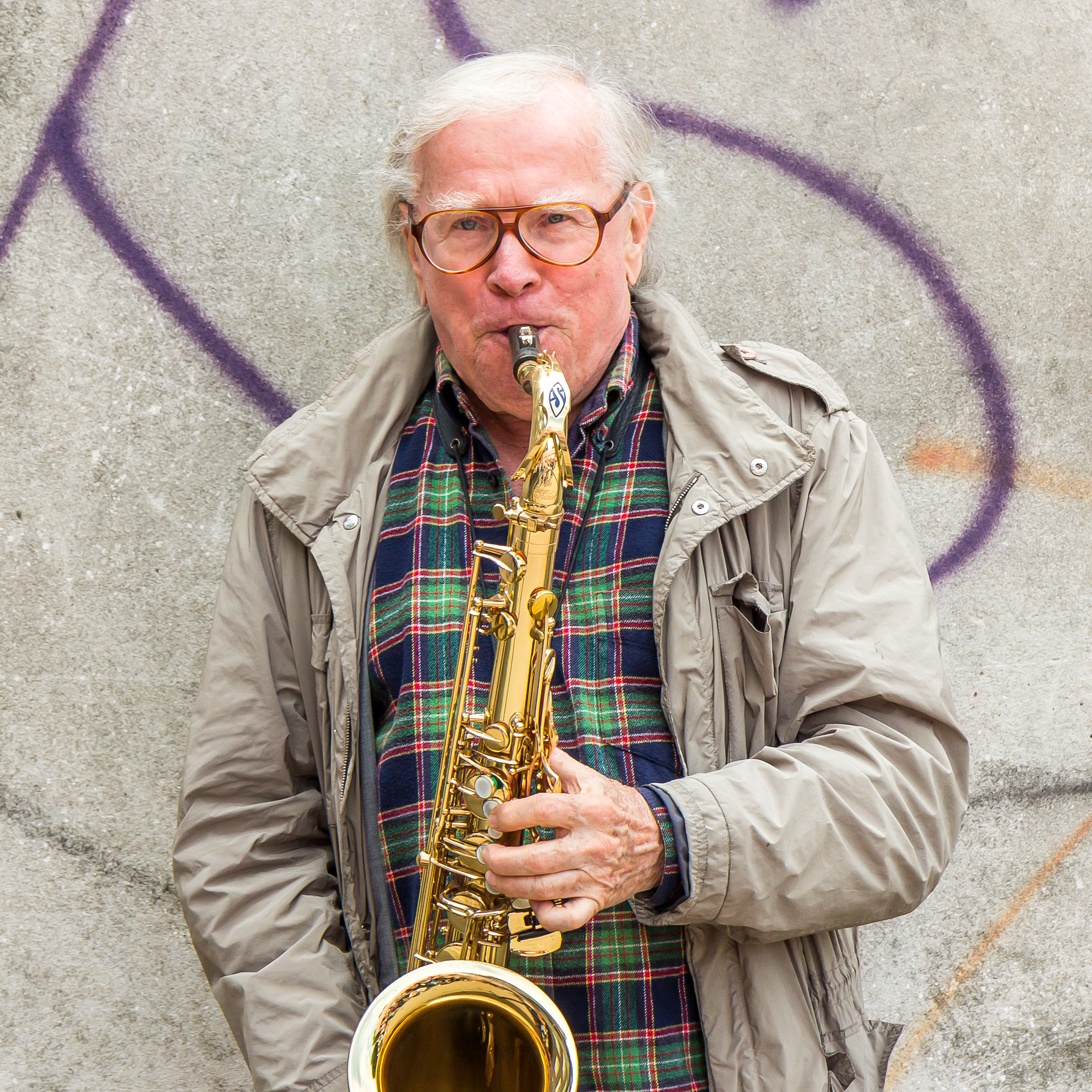
Doldinger filmed for a Tatort episode, "Wacht am Rhein", in 2016

Doldinger used his studio for producing advertisement jingles for Nescafé, Fa and Pril. For television, he first wrote the theme music for programmes airing on the new colour TV format, and then landed his greatest success in 1970: the theme music of the long-ongoing television series Tatort. This was followed by music for the series Ein Fall für Zwei (A Case for Two), Liebling Kreuzberg, Wolffs Revier and Alles außer Mord.

He contributed film scores to the German U-boat film Das Boot (1981) and later The NeverEnding Story (1984), both directed by frequent collaborator Wolfgang Petersen. He composed, among others, music for the 1993 film Salz auf meiner Haut (Salt on Our Skin), directed by Andrew Birkin.

=== Personal life ===
Doldinger married Inge Beck in 1960; his wife worked as a model. they had three children, Viola, Melanie and Nicolas. From 1968, they resided in Icking, a village south of Munich, where he ran his own studio. On 1 September 2022, Doldinger released his autobiography Made in Germany.

Doldinger died on the evening of 16 October 2025 at his home in Icking at the age of 89, exactly 35 years after the death of jazz drummer Art Blakey; he had reportedly been suffering from "severely affected health" since 2023.

President Frank-Walter Steinmeier described him as "a living jazz legend, a creative spirit who always gives improvised music new and independent forms of expression, a composer and arranger who has worked with countless internationally leading jazz musicians, and a teacher and artist whose work has influenced improvised music for decades".

== Selected film and television scores ==
- Negresco (1968)
- Wie kommt ein so reizendes Mädchen zu diesem Gewerbe? (How Did a Nice Girl Like You Get Into This Business?, 1970)
- Baal (1970)
- Tatort (television series, 1970–)
- Das Netz (The Net, 1975)
- Bis zur bitteren Neige (To the Bitter End, 1975)
- The Swiss Conspiracy (1976)
- Der Alte (television series, 1977–)
- Das zweite Erwachen der Christa Klages (The Second Awakening of Christa Klages, 1978)
- Der Sturz (1979)
- Ein Fall für zwei (A Case for Two, television series, 1981–2013)
- Das Boot (1981)
- Die wilden Fünfziger (The Roaring Fifties, 1983)
- Die unendliche Geschichte (The NeverEnding Story, 1984; with Giorgio Moroder)
- Nonni and Manni (1988)
- Peterchens Mondfahrt (Peter in Magicland, 1990)
- Salz auf meiner Haut (Salt on Our Skin,1993)
- Palmetto (1998)

== Writings ==
- Doldinger, Klaus; Groß, Torsten (2022). Made in Germany (in German). München: Piper. ISBN 978-3-492-07124-6.

== Awards ==
- 1976: Deutscher Schallplattenpreis
- 1978: Order of Merit of the Federal Republic of Germany
- 1981: Deutscher Schallplattenpreis
- 1996: Echo Jazz
- 1997: Honorary Bavarian Film Award
- 2005: Grimme Preis
- 2007: Goldene Kamera
- 2007: Bavarian Order of Merit
- 2016: Deutscher Filmpreis
- 2022: DAfFNE from the Deutsche Akademie für Fernsehen
- 2023: Bavarian Maximilian Order for Science and Art
