= Siegfried Loch =

German record producer (born 1940)

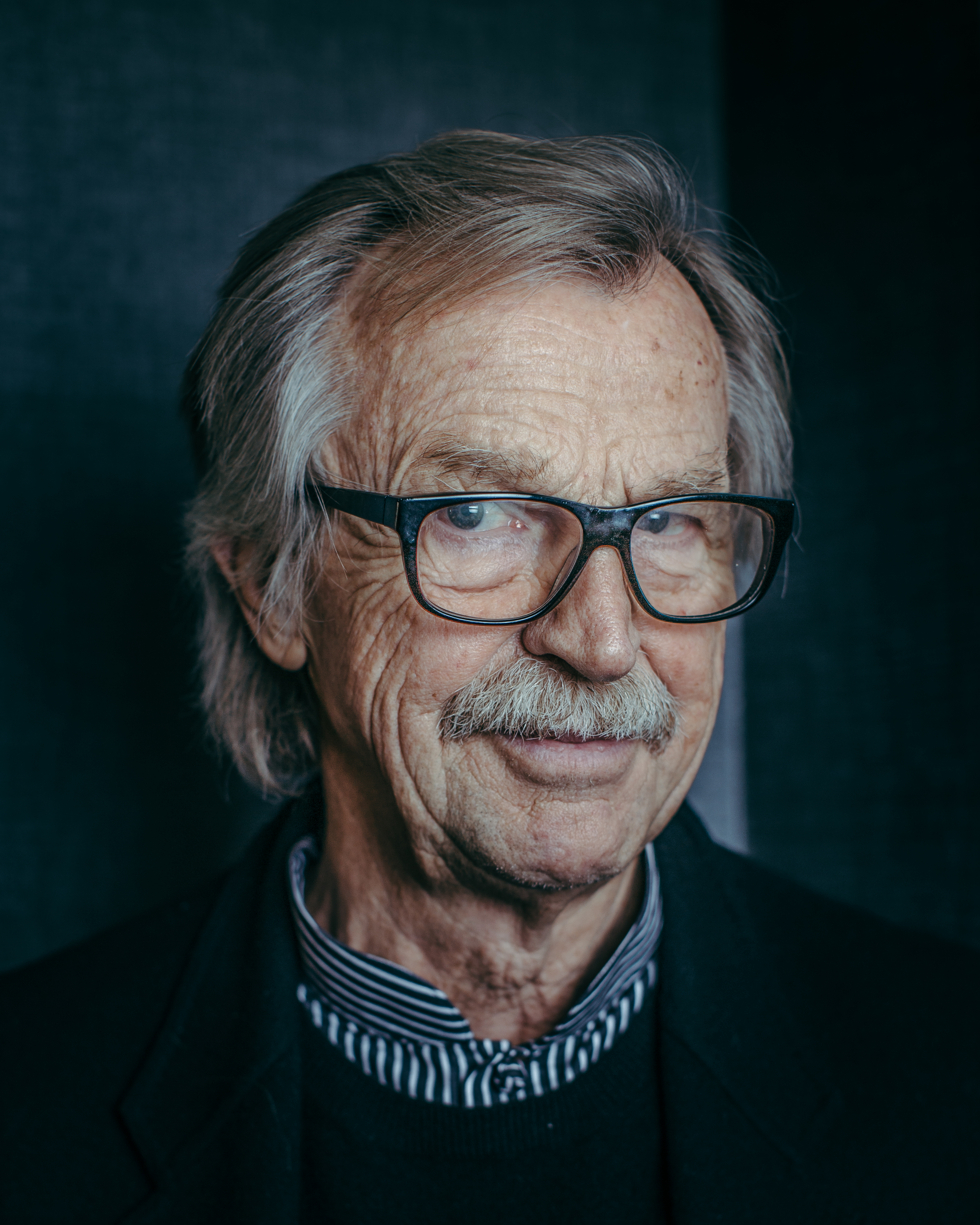

Background information
- Born: 9 August 1940 (age 86); Słupsk, Germany (present day Poland)
- Genre: Jazz
- Occupations: Record producer, musician
- Years active: 1956–present
- Label: ACT Music (founder)
- Website: www.actmusic.com

Siegfried Loch (born 9 August 1940) is a German record producer, a record industry executive, and the founder of the ACT Music record label. As both a producer and record label pioneer, Loch is considered to have had a significant impact on the exposure, development, and success of modern jazz music, particularly European jazz.

During his career Loch has produced recordings for some of the most recognisable names in jazz, including Yusef Lateef, Eddie Harris, Joe Pass, Tim Hagans, Terri Lyne Carrington, Dave Brubeck, Vijay Iyer, Vince Mendoza, George Gruntz, Esbjörn Svensson Trio and Manu Katché; many more released albums on his ACT Music label.

== Early life ==
Loch was born in the German town of Stolp, now Słupsk in present-day Poland. His family fled East Germany in 1951 to Hanover and initially endured financial hardship. Loch's interest in jazz developed after gatecrashing a Sidney Bechet concert in May 1956. Loch described this event as "life changing", stating in a 2020 interview:

I got into a concert by Sidney Bechet. It was the first time that I was aware of listening to jazz. This music radiated the pure joy of life and a feeling of freedom with no limitations. For me this was a moment of complete enlightenment.

He developed as a jazz drummer in the years thereafter but considered his talents insufficient to become a professional musician. He therefore resolved to remain creatively connected to jazz music by engaging in alternative job roles within the music recording industry.

== Career ==
In 1960, Loch joined Electrola, a German subsidiary of EMI, as a foreign sale representative, introducing him to the operations of the recording industry. By 1963, Loch had moved to Hamburg to assume label management responsibility for the jazz section of Philips. Soon afterwards he was persuaded label bosses that he should also assume production responsibilities.

Loch's first production credit was Jazz Made In Germany by the Klaus Doldinger Quartet, the first German jazz album to enjoy a global release. Other early production work was undertaken for George Gruntz, Ingfried Hoffmann, and Don Paulin. Tapping into the growing public interest in blues and rock 'n' roll emerging from outside established jazz clubs, Loch briefly diversified the label by recording and producing a number of acts tangential to German jazz, including Spencer Davis, The Searchers, and Jerry Lee Lewis. Loch's "uncomplicated" production on Jerry Lee Lewis's Live at the Star Club, Hamburg was key to capturing the band's raw and raucous performance, raising Loch's international reputation as a producer. Live at the Star Club, Hamburg has since become widely regarded as one of the greatest live rock 'n' roll albums ever recorded.

By the late 1960s, Loch had become the managing director of the German arm of the newly formed Liberty Records/United Artists label in Munich, with special responsibility for the Blue Note Records catalogue. In 1971 he became founding managing director of WEA Music Hamburg (later to become Warner Music Germany). During this time Loch continued his production activities, including a touchstone recording of Gerry Mulligan, Paul Desmond and the Dave Brubeck Trio. Loch's time at WEA enabled him to work alongside seminal Atlantic Records jazz producer, Nesuhi Ertegun, who later appointed him president of WEA-Europe in London. His ascendancy within the recording industry was reflected in his commercial successes, which some attribute to his zeal for valuing the priorities of artists and listeners, described as a "balancing act between ethics and profitability".

=== ACT Music ===
Loch's seniority within the industry increasingly distracted him from his original musical passions, particularly production:

I was just running a record company, and this was rather successful. I was working for Warner for eighteen years, and at the end of the career I was the president of Warner Europe and then I realised that all of that had taken me away from my initial life in music, and love in music, which of course was jazz. This was in 1988. I decided to leave Warner and become an independent. [...] I started recording some other music, but in 1992, with the project Jazzpaña I started my own jazz label. It took actually thirty years before I realised my dream and had my own label.

After some initial failures, Loch fulfilled his jazz dreams by successfully establishing ACT Music in 1992, named after his commitment to encouraging signed artists to express themselves creatively. Loch's first production project with ACT Music was the jazz-flamenco crossover, Jazzpaña, with The Mendoza-Mardin Project. Jazzpaña assembled Spanish and US musicians with the Cologne-based WDR Big Band, performing arrangements by the then unknown American saxophonist Vince Mendoza. Guests included Michael Brecker, Al Di Meola, Peter Erskine, and Steve Khan. Jazzpaña received critical acclaim and enjoyed two Grammy nominations, quickly establishing the jazz credentials of the label. Loch has remarked that the Jazzpaña album set the blueprint for the ACT Music ethos, which entailed a 'European-flavoured jazz aesthetic' packaged distinctively.

With Loch's combined label management and proficiency in production, ACT Music has since become one of the largest and most successful jazz labels in the world, issuing over 700 albums. Many of these albums have attracted critical plaudits, including prizes or nominations. Prizes have included the German Echo Music Awards, the Norwegian Spellemannprisen, the UK Mercury Music Prize, the US Grammy Award for Best Jazz Instrumental Album, Swedish Grammis, among others. Loch has continued to develop an extensive catalogue for ACT Music and has projected the musical profiles of numerous European jazz artists, including Joachim Kühn, Michael Wollny, Nguyên Lê, Adam Bałdych, Marius Neset, Émile Parisien, and Lars Danielsson, as well as US artists such as Terri Lyne Carrington, Vijay Iyer, Rudresh Mahanthappa, and Scott DuBois.

The success of ACT Music has been attributed to Loch's progressive approach to label management, which has included Loch's ability to identify creative talent and harness his role as a producer to give "optimal exposure to unusual talents". ACT Music is one of the few labels to demonstrate gender parity on its executive board.

== Personal life ==
Loch is a passionate collector of post-war and contemporary art, some of which features as artwork on ACT Music album releases. This is a passion shared with his wife, Sissi Loch, whom he married in 1964. The Siggi & Sissi Loch Collection includes works by Yves Klein, Gerhard Richter, Georg Baselitz, Per Kirkeby and Sigmar Polke, among many others. Some have been auctioned to support the Siggi & Sissi Loch Charitable Foundation. One of Loch's first art acquisitions was by Gerhard Richter, costing close to 15,000 Deutschmarks upon purchase in the early 1970s. Selling the artwork some 40 years later financed Loch's purchase of a house in Berlin.

== Awards ==
- 1998 German Record Critics Award ('Ehrenpreise') : Producer
- 2010 1st Class Knight, the Royal Order Of The Polar Star by King Carl XVI Gustaf of Sweden : For work promoting Swedish jazz
- 2014 Order of Merit of the Federal Republic of Germany : In recognition of his merits for the country and the people
- 2023 'Basisten' Award, Swedish Jazz Association : for support of Swedish jazz
