= Robbi, Tobbi und das Fliewatüüt =

1967 German children's book by Boy Lornsen

Robbi, Tobbi und das Fliewatüüt is a German book for children by Boy Lornsen, first published in 1967.

It was adapted into a screen play for television, a radio and two audio dramas. An audio book exists as well.

== Plot ==
The book themes around the adventures of a pupil called Tobias Findteisen (nicknamed Tobbi) who accompanied the robot ROB 344–66/IIIa (nicknamed Robbi) to help with the latter's exam at robot school. The team travels in an all-in-one vehicle, designed by Tobbi and built by Robbi, to find answers to the exam's riddles all over the world.

Tobbi calls this vehicle (which runs on juice from red raspberries, later substituted by cod liver oil) "Flie-wa-tüüt" because:

1. it can fly (in German: fliegen)
2. it can travel on water (in German Wasser)
3. it can be used as a car (and as such has a klaxon making the sound "tüüt")

During their adventures, young inventor Tobbi and his pilot Robbi have to tackle many challenges.

== Book ==
Robbi, Tobbi und das Fliewatüüt was first published by Verlag K. Thienemann, Stuttgart, in 1967. It featured illustrations by Franz Josef Tripp. The 256-pages sized book was listed in the Auswahlliste des Deutschen Jugendbuchpreises.

== Television series ==
Robbi, Tobbi und das Fliewatüüt
- Created by: Armin Maiwald
- Opening theme: Ingfried Hoffmann
- Composer: Ingfried Hoffmann
- Country of origin: Germany
- Original language: German
- No. of seasons: 1
- No. of episodes: 4

Production
- Production company: WDR

Original release
- Network: ARD
- Release: 3 September – 1 October 1972

Based on the novel, Robbi, Tobbi und das Fliewatüüt was adapted as a German television series for children by WDR in 1972. It was animated by puppeteer Albrecht Roser and his team.

The series used early chroma key technology. Over the years, the series saw countless re-runs.

== Film ==
An animated film, Robbi, Tobbi und das Fliewatüüt was released in 2016, directed by Wolfgang Groos, with Arsseni Bultmann as Tobbi and Alexandra Maria Lara as Sharon Schalldämpfer.

== Plays ==
Known audio drama adaptions:

- WDR radio drama in 1968 with Jürgen von Manger as speaker (Regie: Heinz-Dieter Köhler).
- Intercord audio play in 1972/1973 on three LPs or MCs with Sigi Harreis as Tante Paula and Dieter Eppler as Robbi.
- Karussell audio play in 1991 on two CDs or MCs. This version also became available by Der Audio Verlag (DAV) in 2005, with the cover incorrectly stating made by WDR (which would indicate the 1968 play).
- Der Audio Verlag audio book on 3 times 2 CDs (total playing time 460 minutes), read by Stefan Kaminski in 2006.

== See also ==
- List of German television series
