= Impressions de la Haute Mongolie =

Impressions de la haute Mongolie (Hommage à Raymond Roussel) is a 1976 comedy film directed by Salvador Dalí and José Montes-Baquer, starring Dalí. It is a mockumentary about a hunt through Mongolia for a giant hallucinogenic mushroom. The film is dedicated to Raymond Roussel, author of the similarly titled novel Impressions d’Afrique.
