= Petrus Wandrey =

German artist

- Born: Ulrich Carl Peter Wandrey; 8 March 1939; Dresden, Germany
- Died: 5 November 2012 (aged 73); Hamburg, Germany
- Education: Hochschule für Angewandte Wissenschaften Hamburg (College of Fashion Design, Advertising and Graphic Design in the Free Hanseatic City of Hamburg, Germany), Hochschule für bildende Künste Hamburg (University of Fine Arts of Hamburg, Germany)
- Known for: Painting, Relief, Sculpture, Applied Art, Installation, Graphic, Design
- Movement: Digitalism

Petrus Wandrey (8 March 1939 – 5 November 2012) was a German artist who lived and worked in Hamburg. Wandrey studied at Hochschule für Angewandte Wissenschaften Hamburg (fashion school located at Armgartstraße), from 1960 to 1963, and from 1963 to 1968 at Hochschule für bildende Künste Hamburg. He was influenced by Surrealism, Pop Art and the Dada movement.

Wandrey was fascinated by science and technology. These subjects frequently appear in his work, influenced by the simplicity and brilliance of digital image culture. He proclaimed the Digitalist Movement with the delivery of his panel Science and Beyond at Fordham University, New York, in 1978. The work integrates vertical and horizontal pixel sequences, the smallest square-shaped units displayed on the monitor screen. Pixels create a characteristic silhouette with typically jagged outlines that become one of the trademarks of Wandrey's multi-faceted and highly diverse palette of visual imagery. Another distinctive characteristic in many of his works is his use of computer junk or individually manufactured hardware as elements in the creative process.

== Early years ==
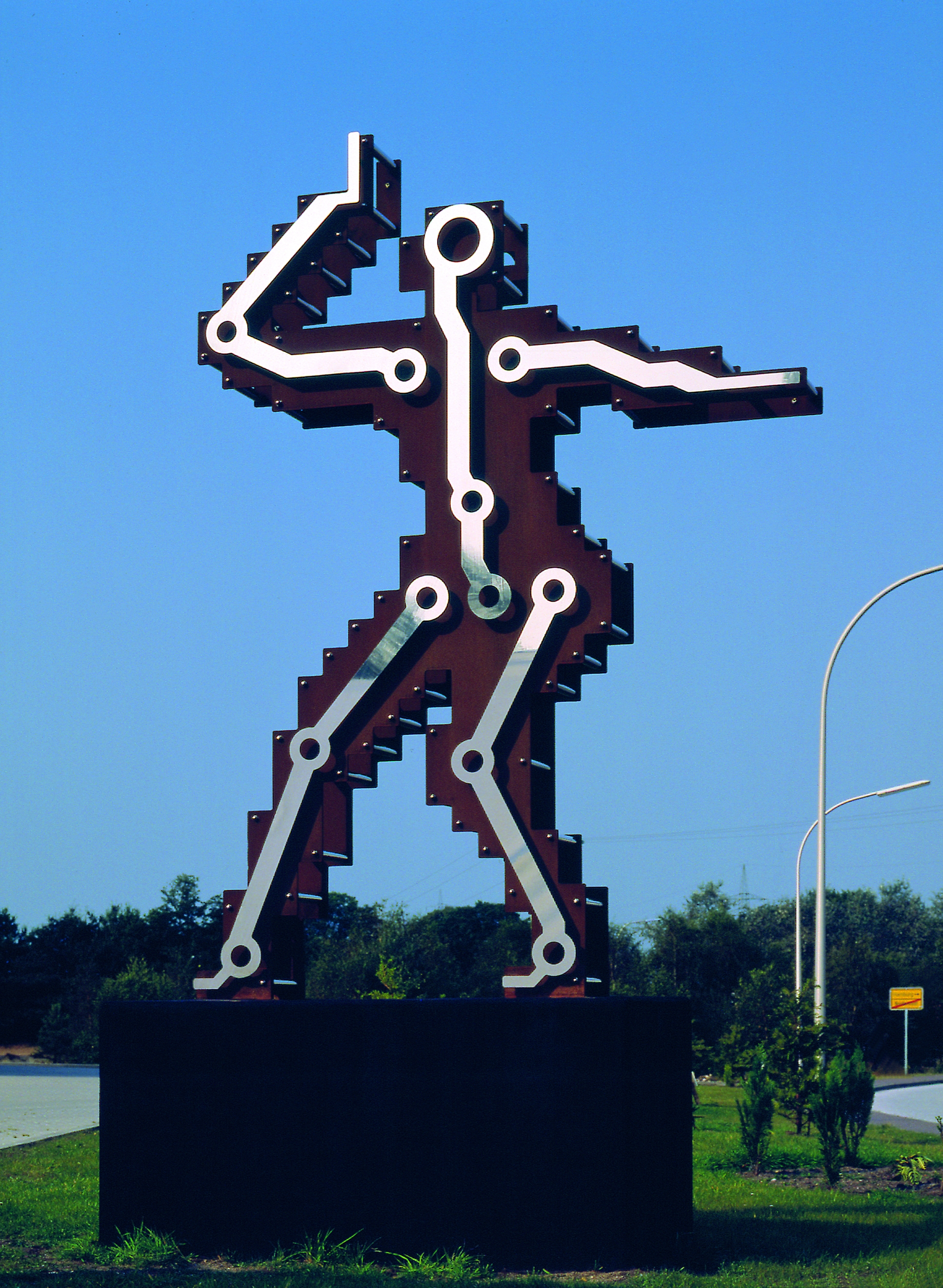
Circuit Woman (1990)

Ulrich Carl Peter Wandrey was born in Dresden. He worked in many creative fields including painting, sculpture, installation art, graphics, art objects, furniture design, jewelry design, and textile design. He initially was a designer and illustrator of countless record sleeves for classic, jazz and rock music. He then designed covers for Der Spiegel and Capital magazines, illustrations for Playboy, Stern, TransAtlantik magazines and for the weekly newspaper Die Zeit. He also created numerous posters, for instance for the Rainer Werner Fassbinder movies Chinese Roulette (1976) and Despair (1978), and for rock stars. Wandrey then used the proceeds from these commissions to finance his own independent work.

In 1975 he travelled to Port Lligat in Spain where he gave his work Venus' Wind to his idol Salvador Dalí as a birthday present. Dalí then put Wandrey's Venus on permanent show in the Mae West Room at his Dalí Theatre and Museum in Figueres, Spain.

== 1974–1983: The Dawn of Digitalism ==
Wandrey almost accidentally discovers the language of shapes that he had long been seeking. Among other things he is inspired by the visual characteristics of the first computer games produced by the multimedia electronics company Atari, and by the transmission of the Arecibo message in 1975 with its concise binary digital information about life on Earth and its position in the Solar System. Wandrey utilizes the design scope of grids and pixel graphics to analogically create his sculptures and pictures. The fascination of Pop Art, Surrealism, the undefined Dada movement and the language of shapes of the digital age form the basis of his artistic innovation and his analysis of the logic of binary imagery.

The visual mode of the dawning computer age was elevated to a creative principle, the pixel - as the smallest unit of the monitor screen - to a compositional device.

In 1978 Wandrey proclaimed his Digitalism in New York with his panel Science and Beyond. Since then he studied and experimented with the extensive possibilities of digital art work. According to Wandrey, the digital language of form does not allow recognizable national or continental features to dominate. Moreover, it is the first symbolic composition method to be globally comprehensible and accepted by people of all nations.

The aesthetic assessment of hardware and its inclusion in art work results in countless experiments. Their intrinsic nature induces Wandrey to investigate the materiality of high-tech tools and the aesthetic attraction of electronic components such as printed circuit boards, LaserDiscs, laser diodes, microchips, cable bundles, heat sink units and plotter prints used in chip assembly. The formal principle of his digital art also includes components extracted from computer junk, as in the installation Personal Identity (1994) and the objects Angel of Recycling 1-3 (1992–1996). The computer is literally disemboweled to construct provoking sculptures and assemblies and combine seemingly contradictory elements. Wandrey calls for "an alliance of art and technology" and characterizes his Digitalism of 1978 as "a stylistic tendency in the visual arts that utilizes digital forms of representation and thus constitutes the form language for the epoch of digital technology".

Rarely was an artist able to label his style and composition technique as accurate as Hamburg based Digitalist Petrus Wandrey.

In that Wandrey intentionally violates the user's manual, the electronic parts are transposed into a new, sometimes astonishing context. Through the intervention of the artist, they are simultaneously demystified and endowed with fresh mysteries.

Similar to the artists of the Renaissance, who created paintings, graphics, sculptures, architecture, or even jewelry and commodities, Wandrey covers a broad spectrum with works such as the architectural model Casa Digitale for a skyscraper or Computer Man (1997), where a human figure echoes the shape of a pictogram. In the 1980s he adds a collection of furniture and room textiles integrating elements of computer iconography. The installation Polart Room (1980) is populated with picture elements and furniture objects based on tenfold enlargements of photo cassette elements from the SX-70 folding single lens reflex Land Camera of the Polaroid Corporation.

== 1984–1993 ==
For the technical realization of his projects Wandrey temporarily cooperates with physicians, technology producing companies, and handicraft enterprises. In 1983 he creates the monumental relief Extraterrestrial Dance (1983) using polispectral colored stainless steel. A new contact with the Norderstedt based printed circuit board manufacturer Heidemarie Heger of Heger GmbH then forms the foundation for many fine arts projects using specially manufactured printed circuit boards as design elements. Professor Dieter Kind, President of the Physikalisch-Technische Bundesanstalt (PTB) in Braunschweig, helps Wandrey to acquire rejected elements from the «H 1» hydrogen maser atomic clock, which he assembles to form the sculpture Atomic Time Guardian (1988). Through Philips RHW, Wandrey is able to access large-format plotter-prints, diagrams of microchips for processor assemblies, which he uses in many of his art compositions. He also uses dual in-line package (DIP), wafers, electrical cables, etc. in many works mounted on stainless steel sheets or wood. In works such as the Jugglers triptych (1989) and Digitalistic Lesson (1989) he uses this hardware and rigorously robs it of its technological meaning by placing it in a purely artistic context. In Orbiter 1–4 (1990) he uses NASA photographs of Mars and complements their segmented formats with printed circuit boards and LaserDiscs. In 1992 Wandrey discovers the bizarre and exciting shapes of heat sink units at the Fischer Elektronik Company. He then exploits their aesthetic potential as assembly and collage elements for image, sculpture, and object arrangements, such as in the sculptures Interface 1-10 (1992).

Chips and printed circuit boards on the one hand exist as real form, with which Wandrey plays and composes. On the other hand for him they are hieroglyphs of an occult, surreal-mystic world. His art migrates between worlds, that of real form and that of surreal transmission and message.

In 1985 curator Prof. Dr. David Galloway shows the furniture Chip-Case and Chip-Table from the series Casa Digitale by Wandrey at the exhibition Artware in the Congress Center Hamburg, Germany. Later that year Wandrey develops computer graphics with the Quantel Paintbox at VAP (Video-Audio-Print), the computer studio of his friend Richard Kunicki. With the help of the journalist and arts exhibition manager Andreas Grosz the Digitalismus (Digitalism) exhibition of paintings, sculptures and objects by Petrus Wandrey is staged at the State Museum of Braunschweig, accompanied by the catalogue Digitalismus. Grosz had already initiated many projects on the subjects of corporate culture, new media, design, and architecture. The exhibition includes a lecture and discussion series on Culture and Technology – Esthetics in Change with contributions by Professors Ulrich Seiffert, Mihai Nadin, Bernd Rebe, Bazon Brock, and Walther Christoph Zimmerli. Since 1991 Wandrey lived in a relationship with Ute Janssen who was born in 1952 and is a doctor of anaesthesiology. In 2010 they married. In 1992 Wandrey traveled to Antibes, where he meets the jurist and entrepreneur Dr. Harald Falckenberg and inspired him to develop an art collection. Since then many of Wandrey's works were added to the Sammlung Falckenberg.

== Since 1994 ==
In 1995 the gallery owner Hans Mayer showed an extensive solo exhibition of Wandrey's works at his commercial gallery in Düsseldorf. It meets with such unexpected success, particularly among young audiences, that it is extended twice. Aesthetics professor Bazon Brock holds the opening speech and writes an article about Wandrey's "digitalist" experiments for Der Spiegel special magazine.

His focus is not on computer aided image production. Wandrey does not pretend to create art with software, as unfortunately legions of naïve technology disciples tend to do. If the medium in itself is the message - holy McLuhan -, then the message cannot be 'art' but only the medium again: Graphic-Computer-In-Action. [...] Or, in the case of Wandrey, hardware has to become heartware.

In 1999 the Leipzig Museum of Applied Arts hosts the exhibition Petrus Wandrey Retrospective. The curator is Prof. Dr. David Galloway, who also publishes the exhibition catalogue at Oktagon Publishing House, Köln (Cologne).

Wandrey died in Hamburg.

== Symbolism ==
=== Super icons Aphrodite and Mona Lisa ===
For Wandrey the super icons of fine art are the ancient Aphrodite of Milos and the world-famous Renaissance masterpiece by Leonardo da Vinci, the Mona Lisa. Inspired by these "fuel rods of cultural history" he transforms them with the means and potential of his compositional principles. Paintings, reliefs and sculptures are the results. He creates his first Venus metamorphoses in 1973. Wandrey and his artist friend Volker Hildebrandt sway David Galloway to publish the edition Mona 2000.

In Mona Lisa: Homage to Leonardo da Vinci (1975), Petrus Wandrey combines the best-known features of the picture – the face and the crossed hands – to create a new, surrealistic interpretation of the original. Later, in the spirit of the New Media, a Mona Digitalis (1988) is produced from circuit boards and plotter drawings, as well as a Cultware series (1991) on plots for the production of microchips. In the progression of media and materials, the artist fulfills a dictum from Goethe which he enjoys quoting: 'One must reinterpret that which is past, rethink it.' [...] Yet there is nothing in Wandrey's oeuvre comparable to his innumerable paraphrases of the Venus de Milo as the incarnation of female beauty and classical proportions.

=== Money ===
Wandrey often had to overcome financial difficulties. Consequently, the subject of money regularly recurs in his work. Many motifs feature collages with US dollar bills as text messages and visual elements, as in Cash-Man (1995) and Cash-Woman (1995). In Rich and Poor Company (1998), Riches Have Wings (1998) and Ex-Rich-Credit-Side (1998) text elements are carved into the wooden picture surfaces, corresponding with mounted US one-dollar bills. Other works featuring the symbolism of money include the Mona Lisa likenesses Mona Money (1998), Victory-Sexy-Euro (1999) and Money Has No Smell (2006). Medicin Plant (2008) depicts a medicinal plant with deceptive blossoms of US dollar bills.

In Mona Money (1998) Wandrey wryly clarifies his ability to unite divergent positions by marrying George Washington's portrait painted by Gilbert Stuart with La Gioconda's body. The likeness of the general and president is depicted on the one-dollar bill "so it must be the most frequently reproduced work of art in history."

As early as 1550, Vasari wrote about 'the so winsome smile' of the lady. Other observers have seen something coquettish here, something cunning, erotic, or even threatening. The sitter's 'secret' has been attributed to pregnancy, tooth decay and even transvestism. For the tightly pressed lips of George Washington, however, there is an historically verifiable determinant: shortly before he sat for his portrait, the General had all his teeth pulled and struggled now with a set of wooden dentures. In Mona Money Wandrey gently lifts the severe corners of the model's mouth and lends him the hint of a 'winsome smile'. Thus, the fusion of two icons acquires a mischievous byplay.

=== Angels ===
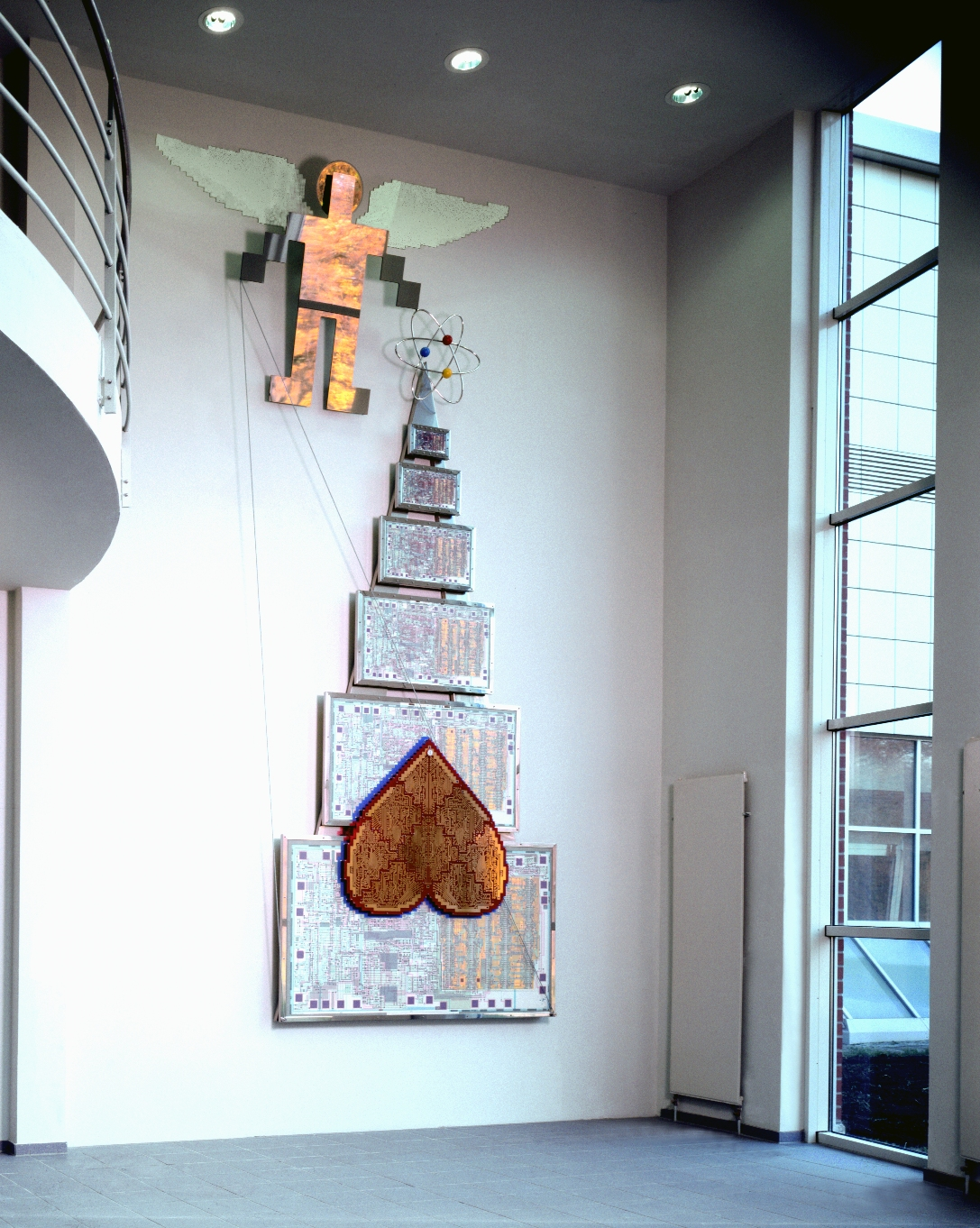
Balance of Power (1992)

Wandrey is convinced that the angel phenomenon is one of mankind's first surrealistic inventions found in almost all early cultures. To this day it is cultivated as a symbol of hope and an intermediary to a higher intelligence in the diverse religions that have also been invented by man. Wandrey admires the unsurpassed beauty and noble composure of winged creatures that can be found not only in Renaissance paintings, such as Annunciation by Leonardo da Vinci, but also in Ancient Greek and Egyptian angel depictions. Wandrey develops the sculpture Atomic-Time-Guardian (1988) as the guardian angel or protector of atomic time. In 1992 he creates his first work on angels, the segmented wall installation Balance of Power for the Physikalisch-Technische Bundesanstalt in Braunschweig. It has a corpus of polished stainless steel, wings of polymethyl methacrylate (acrylic glass) and a halo shimmering with the color spectrum in the light-reflecting siliciumlayer of an optical disc. In 1993 an exhibition titled Angels for Europe features a series of 25 "winged" works in Braunschweig Cathedral, and in 2000 the exhibition Angel Age is held at Hamburg's principal Lutheran St. Catherine's Church. In this context Petrus Wandrey wrote: "Man's longing for supernatural assistance has remained a part of his Intellect in all ages. In times of insecurity, of worldwide menace, the irrational booms. If our age ensures that one thinks and speaks about angels, man will recognize, comprehend and perhaps even follow a peaceful course in his evolution."

=== Masks ===
The characteristic contours in computer graphics, the jagged lines, are reminiscent of Maya and Aztec cultural shapes. Wandrey's masks fit into this context, starting with the poster design for LiLaLe, the artists' festival held by Hamburg's University of Fine Arts (Hochschule für bildende Künste Hamburg) in 1967. The design featured the photograph of a woman's face which was so intensely simplified and erotically manipulated that it acquired an enigmatic, mask-like anonymity creating an almost aphrodisiac effect.

In Software Mask (1979) Wandrey uses sound and image carriers in combination with objets trouvés masks created from gilt picture frames. In Regeneration 1 (1995) an ancient Egyptian mask is transformed by the addition of printed circuits boards, microchips and cooling elements. Referring to this work David Galloway describes "the elegance and ceremonial aura of this improbable fusion of cultures, epochs, and materials. But even works like Mrs. Nerd and Mr. Nerd (1995), which consist entirely of electronic components, suggest something antique, even Aztec." Utopian beauty is radiated by the works Queen Cool and King Cool (2007), limited edition sculptures made from stainless steel, cooling elements and specially manufactured printed circuits boards.

In addition to sculptures and reliefs, Wandrey has also produced numerous graphics and paintings on the theme of masks. Even his own artist logo is simultaneously mask and self-portrait [...].

=== Animals and flowers ===
The motif of the "belling stag" was very popular for wall decoration of petty bourgeois German living rooms and beer taverns in the 19th and 20th centuries. Wandrey took this sickly-sweet icon and propelled it into a new provocative existence as Oh, My Deer (1986). In this way he added continuity to this classic mass product of the kitsch industry and carried it into the digital age. The large-sized relief depicts the nationally venerated cultural icon as a "cyber stag" created from specially manufactured printed circuits boards with a blinking light emitting diode for its eye and surrounded by cable bushes on a copper background. The stag appears again in My Deer (1986), a sculpture made from printed circuit boards and stainless steel. For several years the artist collected more than 200 advertising icons from leaflets and newspapers focusing exclusively on animal motifs. He then worked them into a substantial picture series, the Propagandimals series (2007), translating them into digitalistic language forms. The oil painting Warning Decadence (1990) is one of Wandrey's political and socio-critical works. It features a black cat with eyes depicted as atomic radiation warning signs. The cat is standing on a gradually melting bar of gold and possesses an aggressive, gleaming aura. Wandrey creates the Artist's multiple hybrid flowers between 1994 and 2000: Hybrid-Rose (1994), Hybrid-Lily (1995), Hybrid-Tulip (1996), Hybrid-Sunflower (1998) and Hybrid-Lotus (2000).

Humor runs like a leitmotif through all the works of Petrus Wandrey. The playful handling of themes, materials, fine-arts quotations and even titles can be regarded as part of his surrealist heritage. [...] The artist's merriment is perhaps most directly experienced in a group of works with animal and flower motifs. In these jeux d'esprit he seems to put his "kitsch-courage" to the test and yet, at the same time, to overcome through winsome domesticated subjects the resistance that the viewer often feels when confronted with new-media art.

=== Cyborg – man ===
The central theme of Wandrey's oeuvre is man in his "Brave New World". In Fall of Man (1991) Adam and Eve are made of electronic elements, yet they still seem to be naked. They are mounted on large-scale colored copperplate engravings by Giovanni Volpato (1733–1803) and Johann Ottaviani depicting the magnificent wall decorations of the Vatican Loggias. Numerous works give the impression of man as a cyborg or as composite creatures from virtual and natural worlds, addicted and totally dependent on technological luxuries, such as in the monumental four-part work Chronokrat 1–4 (1988). Wandrey took the classic icon of shock, horror, and fear in the face of apocalyptic world events, conflict and war, the world-famous painting The Scream (1910) by Edvard Munch, as a departure point for various digital world interpretations, such as Echo (1989). Man also appears as an erotic being in Wandrey's works, for example in the triptych New Age (1978–79), which is based on Faustian subject matter. The female torso Heavy-Petting (1993) is ingeniously appetizing. And the interpretation of man naturally includes the many portraits of celebrities and friends of the artist.

The portrayal of a cabled human in the sculpture Astronaut (1991), which is a good two meters high, is reminiscent of a heroic suit of armor but made from printed circuit boards, optical discs and stainless steel. Personal Identity (1994) and Narcissus (1994) on the other hand depict a human being in everyday surroundings, standing in front of a mirror, sitting at a table, utterly cabled and networked right down to the mass of wires that replace each figure's hair. The first is the ancient motif of self-reflection, the search for one's own ego: the cyborg sits in front of a monitor, where colored masks in all variations of "his" face alternate in constant succession.

Hereby, the figure fulfills Vilém Flusser's image of the new city as a 'rental agency for masks'. [...] this vision, with its mixture of hope and horror, is one Wandrey has depicted in a monumental, interconnected sequence of pictures with the title Virtual Contact (1994), in which ten life-sized male and ten life- sized female torsi can be randomly interconnected through "plugs" in the brain, the posterior, the genitals or the heart. This work alone would be sufficient evidence that even today, 20 years after his Digitalism manifesto, the artist is still seeking for ways to deal with technological progress, both aesthetically and philosophically.

=== Dancers ===
Wandrey's "Dancers" mirror his love of music and consequently possess strong autobiographical traits. Aged 15, as a fan of jazz vibe player Wolfgang Schlüter of the Michael-Naura-Quintet, he is already a regular at the Hamburg jazz club Barrett. In 1958 Wandrey experiments as a vibe player in a specially founded modern jazz-combo. In the sixties countless nights are spent at beat clubs like the Top Ten Club and Star-Club, and in the seventies Wandrey is fascinated by punk rock which duly inspires his paintings and objects.

A female friend at the Hamburgische Staatsoper Ballett (Hamburg State Opera Ballet) introduces him to the beauty of classical and modern ballet. He admires the strict techniques generating the smooth and effortless motion sequences that are abruptly interrupted by what seems to be a "freezing" of certain positions. The works reminiscent of dancers under the stroboscope, Dancer 1–4 (1986), were inspired by Wandrey's freelance activities at light shows in many beat clubs. He developed Circuit-Dancer 1–4 in 1986 with specially manufactured printed circuit boards mounted on figure silhouettes of stainless-steel. He later completed the small sculptures Techno-Dancer 1–2 (2002) and numerous porcelain objects for the famous Meissen State Porcelain Factory.

This group of works concentrates largely on the graceful positions in classical ballet, with the exception of an acrylic and printed circuits board combination, Digital Kid (1986), and a sequence of twelve works on handmade paper, Brave New Dancer (1987), which focus on the disco world. The Dream-Dancer series (1985) is among the earliest of these works. Here he took colored prints from an ancient catalogue for drapery and fancy trimmings as a background for dancers with zigzag contours borrowed from the pixel resolution of monitor screens. They "seem unfazed by the somewhat musty décor of their surroundings. In fact, the artist typically creates a harmony between seemingly dissonant visual languages. Later the ballet stars gain their independence to appear as the subjects of paintings and sculptures as well as reliefs that are playfully complemented by "dancing" light diodes."

Situated on the Radweg-zur Kunst ("Bike-Route-to-Art"), section Kunst beWEGt ("art in movement"), is Wandrey's sculpture EURO-DANCER (2003), corten-steel cut-out on cut-out stainless-steel on a concrete pedestal, measurements 340 x 100 x 120 cm.

=== Iconoclasm ===
As early as 1973 Wandrey created two tables, one featuring axes as table legs, Hatchet-Table (1977), and the other featuring saws as legs, Saw-Table (1977). In Blade-Table (1980) he focuses on the famous punk symbol with two heavily enlarged razor blades made of polished stainless steel functioning as the base and the tabletop.

In the mid nineties Wandrey discovers a new subject. The resulting motifs deal with the simplest forms of visualization, in other words the question of imagery itself. They are pictures without content, simply emblematic allusions to destruction by such implements as scissors, saws, knives, axes and hatchets. They suggest damage and even destruction to the revered image, and Wandrey transforms them into aluminum reliefs, plots, paintings and works in wood. The focus on destruction continues with sawed-up classicist picture frames in the digitalistic image compositions of several relief groups, such as Misfit 1–5 (2003) or Flash-Back 1–2 (2006).

In the series Cut on Dotted Line (1996) lines and scissors complement the new visual repertoire. Pictures are symbolically annulled through crossing out, which in turn creates astonishingly new variations of imagery and expression. Handprints "defile" the surfaces of canvasses and paper, whilst paradoxically reminding the viewer of the proud handprints in the cave paintings of prehistoric artists.

Further expressions of the literally curtailed flow of information include Black Right Hand Out (1996) in which the aluminum relief of a gigantic hand is mounted directly onto a decorative 19th-century gilded frame; Black Sign Off (1996) in which an exquisite 18th-century frame is crossed out and thus virtually made null and void; Blue Icon 1–2 (1995) in which the naked canvas is rendered useless by an aluminum cross, and finally Black Hook (1995) in which the creative image surface is simply checked off and forgotten.

Wandrey's Bildersturm [iconoclasm] also made him attentive to the signs and symbols of advertising where, for example, a stylized pair of scissors makes it clear to the reader that he should cut out a coupon along dotted line. The artist collected these and similar visual signals that can also be regarded as an invitation to "destroy" a sheet of paper. Reflections and experiments of this kind ultimately led to the Fire! ensemble (1998), produced from the charred remains of an information stand at documenta 9. [...] Augmented with digitalized flames, this dramatic, three-part work underscores the fragile line that can separate creativity and destruction.

=== Politics ===
The debate with political reality induces Wandrey to create extremely diverse of works. His maternal grandmother acts as an early role model with her contempt for Nazism, and her openly expressed hostility to the National Socialist Party causes her significant hardship. Banishment by the German communists (KPD) in 1945 also drives the family into desperate circumstances whilst cementing their hopes for a democratic government and way of life. The artist is confronted with the atrocities of the Holocaust through films that are discussed in classes at school. The extreme horror of this experience moves him to depict this subject with unsurpassed clarity in the painting Holocaust (1976), where a gilded figure of Christ is nailed to a bloody swastika.

The painting Warning War (1995) shows a torso clad in military camouflage fabric with blood gushing from the neck and the stumps of the arms and legs. The motif of extreme human suffering is formulated with accusing clarity in (2004–2006), based on the notorious photo of a torture scene at Abu Ghraib prison in Iraq on 4 November 2003. In the large-format painting the hooded man tormented by US personnel is displayed in front of the Christian cross bearing the colors and contours of the American Star-Spangled Banner.

A work of greatest importance to Wandrey is the life-sized Heldenporträt (portrait of a hero - 2004), which he produced as a silkscreen on canvas and depicts Hitler's attempted assassin Claus Schenk Graf von Stauffenberg in military uniform with angel's wings. The subjects of war, greed and other vices can be found in many of Wandrey's works. His attitude becomes clear in his call for the artistic community to act on its obligation and help to lead the intellectual battle against political injustices and religious fanaticism.

The increasing wastefulness in our throwaway society is addressed in the sculpture Recycler (2009). Greed is illustrated in the large-format silkscreen on canvas Greed Kills (2008) depicting a gigantic golden calf" with a figure in the foreground composed of two machine guns and a skull. The figure's forehead bears the logo of the powerful and ruthless "private army" of the US, the security contractor "Blackwater Worldwide". His mixture of enthusiasm and skepticism towards the charismatically proclaimed vision of the American President Barack Obama can be seen in the diptych Evergreen-Evergrey - ¥ € $ We Can - ¥ € $ We Pay (2009). Here Wandrey gets to the point, or rather crystallizes his views into concise pixels, about speculative solutions and horror headlines surrounding worldwide financial crashes, gigantic losses in value and the Bankruptcy Abuse Prevention and Consumer Protection Act.

== Exhibitions ==
=== Solo exhibitions ===
- Berlin, Spandau Citadel, Bastion Kronprinz, DIGITALISM ART - die geniale Welt des Petrus Wandrey, 2014
- Verden/Aller, DIGITALISMUS-PETRUS WANDREY, Gallery Sabatier, 2006
- Bodenburg, DIGITAL-GENIAL-DIGITALISMUS, DIGI-ART-SHOW, Kunstgebäude Schlosshof Bodenburg, Kunstverein Bad Salzdetfurth e.V., 2004
- Cologne, PETRUS WANDREY – Meissener Porzellan für die digitale Epoche, Galerie im Meissen-Haus, 2002
- Hamburg, ANGEL AGE, principal Lutheran St. Catherine's Church, 2000
- Regensburg, COOL-COOL, Gallery Lindinger + Schmid, 1999
- Bremen, DIGITALISMUS, University of Bremen – LFM, 1999
- Leipzig, PETRUS WANDREY – RETROSPEKTIVE, Museum of Fine Arts, 1999
- Düsseldorf, DIGITALISMUS – PETRUS WANDREY, Gallery Hans Mayer, 1995
- Braunschweig, ENGEL FÜR EUROPA, Braunschweig Cathedral, 1994
- Hamburg, DIGITALISMUS, Deutsche Aerospace - Airbus - GmbH, 1992
- Hannover, DIGITALISMUS, Lower Saxony-Pavilion, Industrial Fair Hannover, 1991
- Braunschweig, DIGITALISMUS – PETRUS WANDREY, Braunschweigisches Landesmuseum, 1990
- Frankfurt a. M., DIGITALISMUS, Dresdner Bank AG – Electronic Banking Centre, 1989
- Hamburg, DIGITALISMUS, Electrum – Museum of Electricity, 1986
- Berlin, BILDER UND OBJEKTE, Internationale Funkausstellung, 1983
- New York, Proclamation of DIGITALISM with the work SCIENCE AND BEYOND, Institute of Scientific Humanism at Fordham University, 1978

=== Group exhibitions ===
- Bodenburg, "HORTUS MEDICUS", Kunstverein Bad Salzdetfurth e.V., 2010
- Bodenburg, "...EINEN AUGENBLICK, BITTE!" – PLEASE CAST AN EYE, Kunstverein Bad Salzdetfurth e.V., 2008
- Chicago, LIFE AS A LEGEND: MARILYN MONROE, Chicago Cultural Center, 2008
- Bodenburg, TRZEBA MIEC NOSA – HAVE A GOOD NOSE, Kunstverein Bad Salzdetfurth e.V., 2008
- Quarnstedt / Gartow, POLITICS, Westwendischer Kunstverein e.V., 2008
- Vienna, Munich, Kiel, "True Romance – Allegorien der Liebe von der Renaissance bis heute", Vienna, Kunsthalle Vienna, October 5, 2007, to February 3, 2008; Munich, Museum Villa Stuck, February 21 to May 18, 2008; Kiel, Kunsthalle Kiel of the Christian-Albrechts-University. May 31 to September 9, 2008
- Lüdenscheid, "GUT+BÖSE / Politik, Kunst, Gesellschaft", City Gallery Lüdenscheid, November 25, 2006, to February 18, 2007
- Bodenburg, LEND ME YOUR EAR, Kunstverein Bad Salzdetfurth e.V., 2006
- Bodenburg, LA MAIN DANS LA MAIN, Kunstverein Bad Salzdetfurth e.V., 2005
- Halle, DER AUGENBLICK IST EWIGKEIT, Kunsthalle e.V., 2003
- Leipzig, AUF DEN PUNKT GEBRACHT – Porzellane für Meissen, Grassi-Museum, 2000
- Gladbeck, COMPUTERKUNST '98, Innovation Centre Wiesenbusch-Gladbeck, 1998
- Leverkusen, GLOBAL FUN, Museum Morsbroich, 1998
- Bodenburg, VOM SCARABÄUS ZUM NEW BEETLE, Kunstverein Bad Salzdetfurth e.V., 1999
- Hannover, AUGENLUST, Art House Hannover, 1998
- Bodenburg, EUROPA BESTEIGE DEN STIER, Kunstverein Bad Salzdetfurth e.V., 1998
- Berlin, Artforum-Berlin '97, Lutz Teutloff Gallery, 1997
- Bonn, ARTIST FOR NATURE, State Art Arena, 1996
- Regensburg, EIN HAUS VOLLER HÄUSER, Gallery Lindinger+Schmid, 1996
- Chicago, ART-Chicago, Gallery Hans Mayer GmbH, 1996
- Basel, ART-Basel '96, Gallery Hans Mayer GmbH, 1996
- Hagen, TORSO, Gallery M. Schlieper, 1996
- Frankfurt a.M., ART-Frankfurt, Lutz Teutloff Gallery, 1996
- Paris, FIAC '94, Gallery Hans Mayer GmbH, 1994 and 1995
- Frankfurt a.M., ART-Frankfurt, Gallery Hans Mayer GmbH, 1994 and 1995
- Gent, Belgien, LINEA '83, Design-Fair, 1983

== Literature ==
- Brock, Bazon, Prof. "Heartware". SPIEGEL special. 3/1995. Hamburg: SPIEGEL - VERLAG Rudolf Augstein GmbH & Co. KG: 146–153.
- Galloway, David (1999). PETRUS WANDREY Bilder, Skulpturen, Objekte. Cologne: Oktagon. ISBN 3-89611-069-1.
- Falckenberg, Harald (2000). Angel Age – Abstract from the Exhibition Opening Speech. Principal Lutheran St. Catherine's Church, Hamburg.
- Grosz, Andreas (1990). "DIGITALISMUS Petrus Wandrey". KUNST UND TECHNOLOGIE – Ästhetik im Wandel. 61. Braunschweig: Veröffentlichungen des Braunschweigischen Landesmuseums. ISBN 3-927939-06-4.
