= Johanna Liebeneiner =

German actress

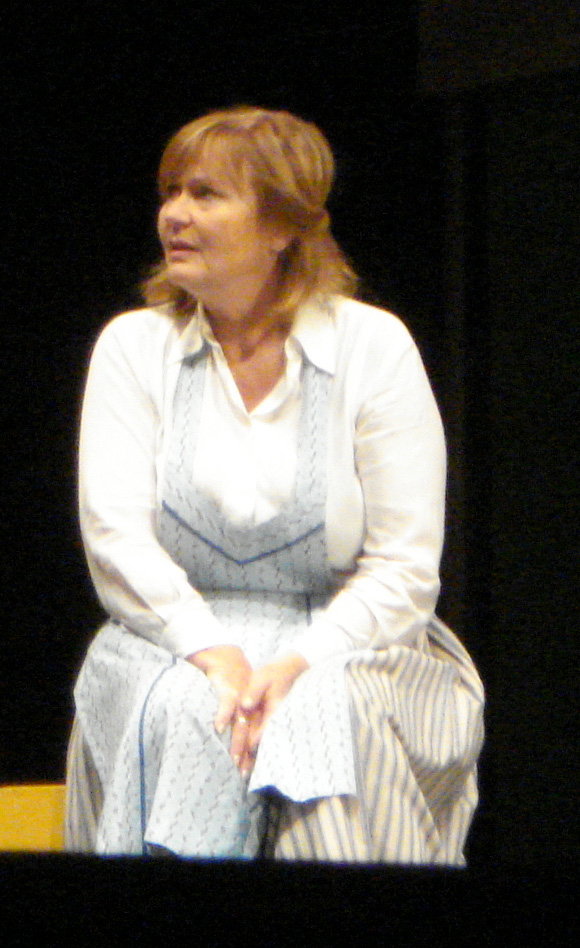
- Liebeneiner in 2008
- Born: 25 June 1945 (age 80); Hamburg, Germany
- Occupation: Actress
- Years active: 1965-

Johanna Liebeneiner (born 25 June 1945) is a German stage, film and television actress. She is the daughter of the actors Hilde Krahl and Wolfgang Liebeneiner.

== Bibliography ==
- Goble, Alan. The Complete Index to Literary Sources in Film. Walter de Gruyter, 1999.
