= Boy Lornsen =

German sculptor and writer

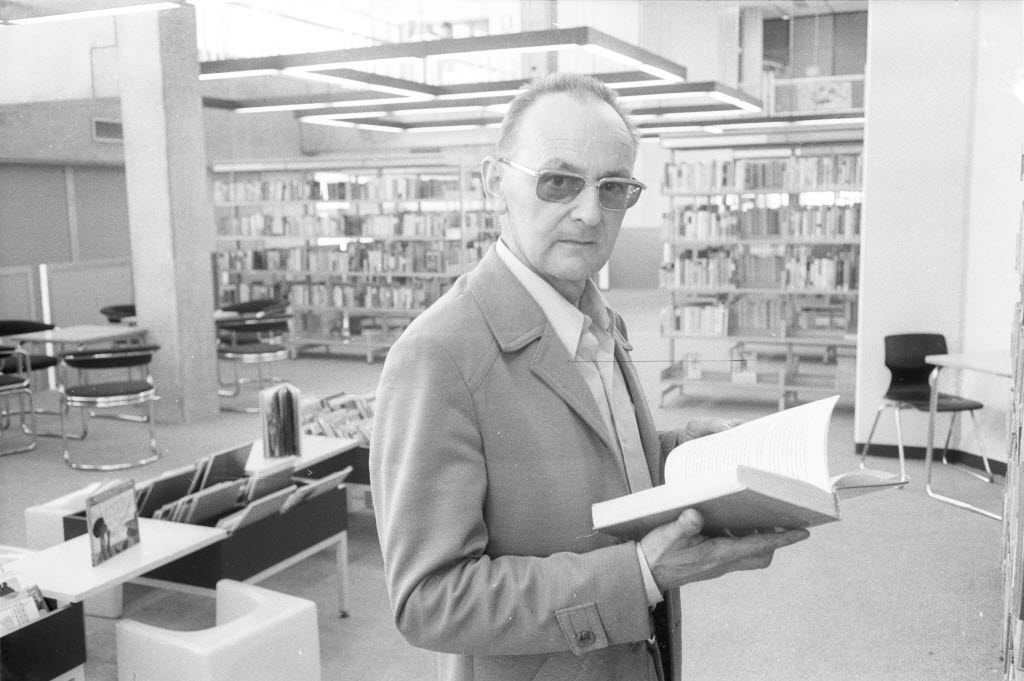
- On the occasion of the opening of the new district library in Friedrichsort.
- Born: 7 August 1922; Keitum, Sylt, Schleswig-Holstein, Germany
- Died: 26 July 1995 (aged 72); Keitum, Sylt, Schleswig-Holstein, Germany
- Occupations: Sculptor and author of children's literature
- Writing career
- Language: Standard German, Platt
- Genre: Children's literature

Boy Lornsen (7 August 1922 – 26 July 1995) was a German sculptor and author of children's literature, writing both in Standard German and in Platt.

Lornsen served as pilot and radio operator in the German Luftwaffe during World War II. After the war, he was educated as a sculptor at Hanover. He worked as a sculptor into the 1960s.

In 1967, he published his first children's book, about a boy who helps a robot with his homework, Robbi, Tobbi und das Fliewatüüt. The book was a success, and was adapted for television in 1972. Lornsen was a member of P.E.N. from 1981.

Lornsen's books were translated into numerous languages, including Greek, Japanese and Norwegian. In 1980, his Jakobus Nimmersatt was adapted by Japan's Nippon Animation studio into a TV special, Nodoka Mori no Dobutsu Daisakusen (The Great Plan of the Animals of Placid Forest), directed by Yoshio Kuroda; the special was released in English under two different titles, Back to the Forest and Peter of Placid Forest.

Paul the Octopus was named after one of his poems: Der Tintenfisch Paul Oktopus.

== Bibliography ==
- Robbi, Tobbi und das Fliewatüüt (1967)
- Jakobus Nimmersatt (1968)
- Abakus an mini-Max (1970)
- Barrnabas und seine Welt (1972)
- Feuer im Nacken (1974)
- Der Brandstifter von Tarafal (1974)
- Dies und das kann Fridolin (1978)
- Gottes Freund und aller Welt Feind (1980)
- Auf Kaperfahrt mit der Friedlichen Jenny (1982)
- Hieronymus Bosch (1983)
- Williwitt und Fischermann (1983)
- Williwitt und der große Sturm (1983)
- Williwitt und Vogelmeier (1984)
- Ferien im Storchendorf (1984)
- Sinfunikonzert - 13 plattdeutsche Gedichte (1984)
- Tim Träumer (1985)
- Wasser, Wind und Williwitt (1985)
- Nis Puk in der Luk (1985)
- Traugott und Das Wildschwein (1985)
- Der Hase mit dem halben Ohr (1986)
- Tante Jeske (1986)
- Seenotrettungskreuzer Adolph Bermpohl (1987)
- Nis Puk - Mit der Schule stimmt was nicht (1988)
- Sie wohnen hinter dem Deich (1989)
- Schiffe: vom Einbaum zum Ozeanriesen (1989)
- Die Möwe und der Gartenzwerg oder... (1989)
- Sien Schöpfung un wat achterno keem (1991) (als Hörbuch [Audio-CD] 2002 im Quickborn-Verlag)
- Nis Puk und die Wintermacher (1993)
- Das Wrack vor der Küste (1993)
- Jesus von Nazareth. Een Stremel Weltgeschicht (1994)
- Klaus Störtebeker
