= Jack Sels =

Belgian jazz saxophonist, arranger, and composer

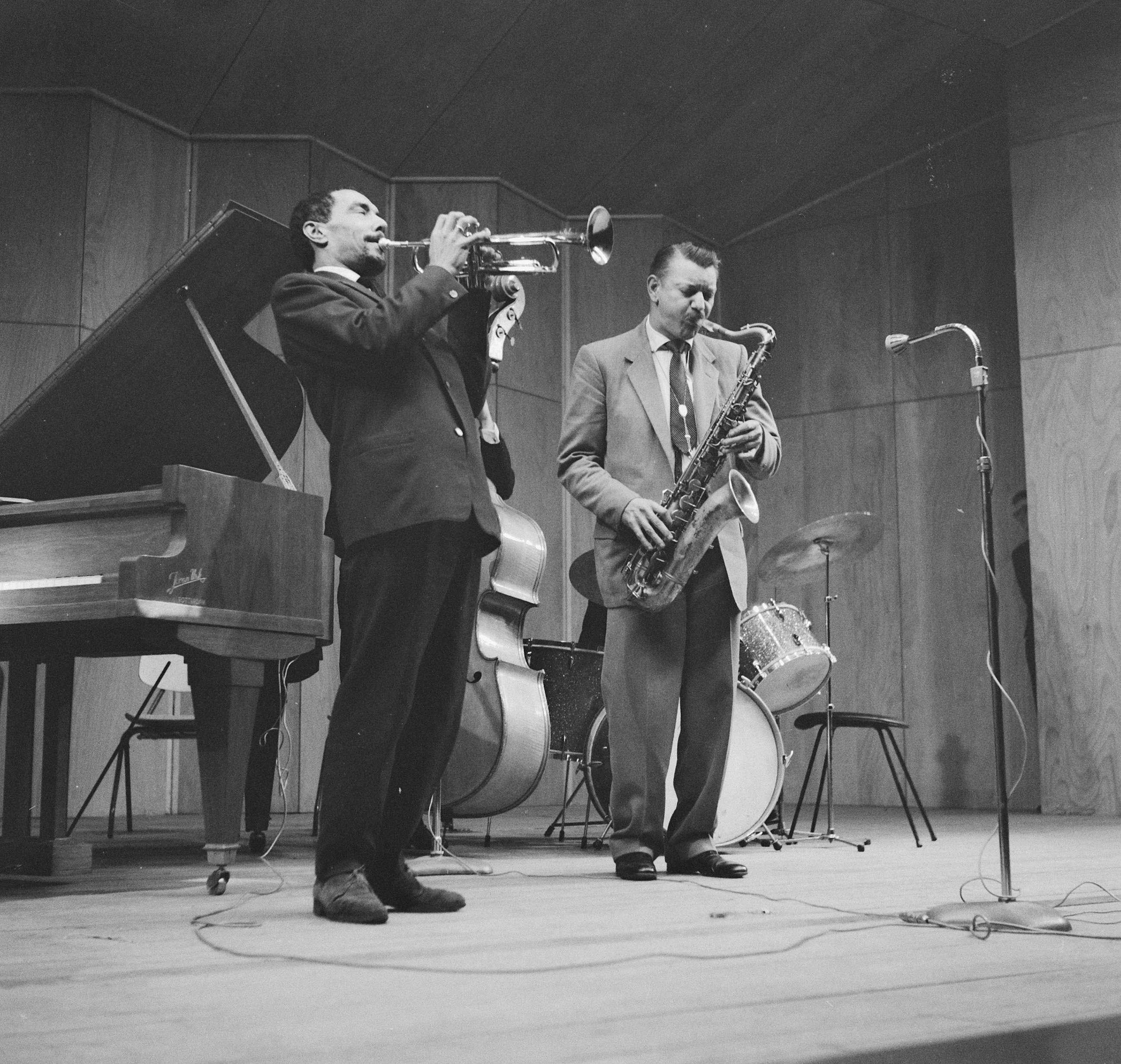
- Sels (right) performs in Rotterdam with Ado Broodboom on trumpet (1960)

Background information
- Born: Jean-Jacques Sels; 29 January 1922; Berchem, Belgium
- Died: 21 March 1970 (aged 48) Antwerp
- Genres: Jazz
- Occupation: Musician
- Instrument: Saxophone

Jean-Jacques (Jack) Sels (29 January 1922 – 21 March 1970) was a Belgian jazz saxophonist, arranger, and composer.

== Biography ==
Jack Sels, a prominent figure in the Belgian jazz scene, began his journey in music by collecting jazz records as a teenager while growing up in Antwerp. A substantial inheritance from his father allowed Sels to amass a 10,000 records, but a bombing during Second World War destroyed it. He studied piano and then taught himself to play the tenor saxophone. To earn a living, he worked in an ice cream parlour in the Antwerp Hoogstraat (High Street). He spent much time listening to his jazz idols, including tenor saxophonist Lester Young, trumpeters Miles Davis, Dizzy Gillespie and alto saxophonist Charlie Parker. After the Second World War many American and Canadian soldiers arrived in the port of Antwerp and Jack Sels eagerly engaged with them to listen to the new records they brought from the United States, helping him to further expand his record collection.

The arrival of Dizzy Gillespie's big band at Antwerp in 1948 had a significant impact on Jack Sels, which led to the founding of his own big band and the composition of the music that they would perform. The band made an impressive debut with some of the best musicians of that time. On trumpet: Paul Heyndrickx, Charlie Knegtel, Theo Mertens, Herman and Nick Sandy Fissette; on trombone: Nat Peck, Frans Van Dijk, Jan Mertens and Christian Kellens; on Sax: Jay Cameron, Marcel Peeters, Gene Verstrepen, Bobby Jaspar and Roger Asselberghs plus Jean Warland on bass, Francis Coppieters on piano, John Ward on drums, Rudy Frankel on conga and Vilez Bill on bongo drum. However, because of financial and other problems, it was hard for him to hold such a big band together. In 1951, he formed a band with 15 musicians, modelled after his idol Miles Davis, and later a still smaller group with which he toured in Germany. Back in Belgium, in 1954, he recorded six tracks in boogy style for Ronnex Records and performed on stage with Nat King Cole.

In 1955, he composed the soundtrack for the movie Meeuwen Sterven in de Haven (Seagulls Die in the Harbour) by Roland Verhavert. From 1958 on, he worked on radio programs for the NIR, the later BRT radio, and on behalf of the Adult Education department of the Ministry of Culture, he toured through Flanders to promote jazz music. That same year, he played with his group at the World Exhibition in Brussels.

Although Jack Sels played with jazz legends like Dizzy Gillespie, Lester Young, Lou Bennett and Kenny Clarke, his decision to remain in Antwerp limited his international fame. During the last three years of his life, his health declined significantly, making it very difficult for him to play. He suffered a heart attack in his Antwerp home and died on 21 March 1970.
