= Peter Trunk =

German composer

Peter Trunk (May 17, 1936, Frankfurt – December 31, 1973, New York) was a German jazz double-bassist.

Trunk played late in the 1950s in concert and on radio with Kenny Clarke, Stan Getz, Albert Mangelsdorff, and Zoot Sims. During this time he also recorded with Hans Koller. In the 1960s, he worked with Benny Bailey, Don Byas, Klaus Doldinger, Dusko Goykovich, Volker Kriegel, Tete Montoliu, Manfred Schoof, Lucky Thompson and Ben Webster. In 1972 he recorded with Kurt Edelhagen. On New Year's Eve, 1973, he was killed in a car accident.

== Discography ==
=== As sideman ===
- Benny Bailey, Midnight in Europe (MCE 1964)
- Klaus Doldinger, Live at Blue Note Berlin (Philips, 1963)
- Klaus Doldinger, Doldinger in Sud Amerika (Philips, 1965)
- Klaus Doldinger, Goes On (Philips, 1967)
- Dusko Goykovich, Swinging Macedonia (Philips, 1967)
- George Gruntz, Jazz Goes Baroque (Philips, 1964)
- George Gruntz, Jazz Goes Baroque 2 (Philips, 1965)
- Ingfried Hoffmann, From Twen with Love (Philips, 1966)
- Volker Kriegel, With a Little Help from My Friends (Liberty 1968)
- Volker Kriegel, Spectrum (MPS/BASF, 1971)
- Tete Montoliu, Piano for Nuria (SABA, 1968)
- Lucky Thompson, Lord, Lord, Am I Ever Gonna Know? (Candid 1997)
- Ben Webster & Don Byas, Ben Webster Meets Don Byas (SABA, 1968)
