= Military officers' club =

Place of leisure for military officers

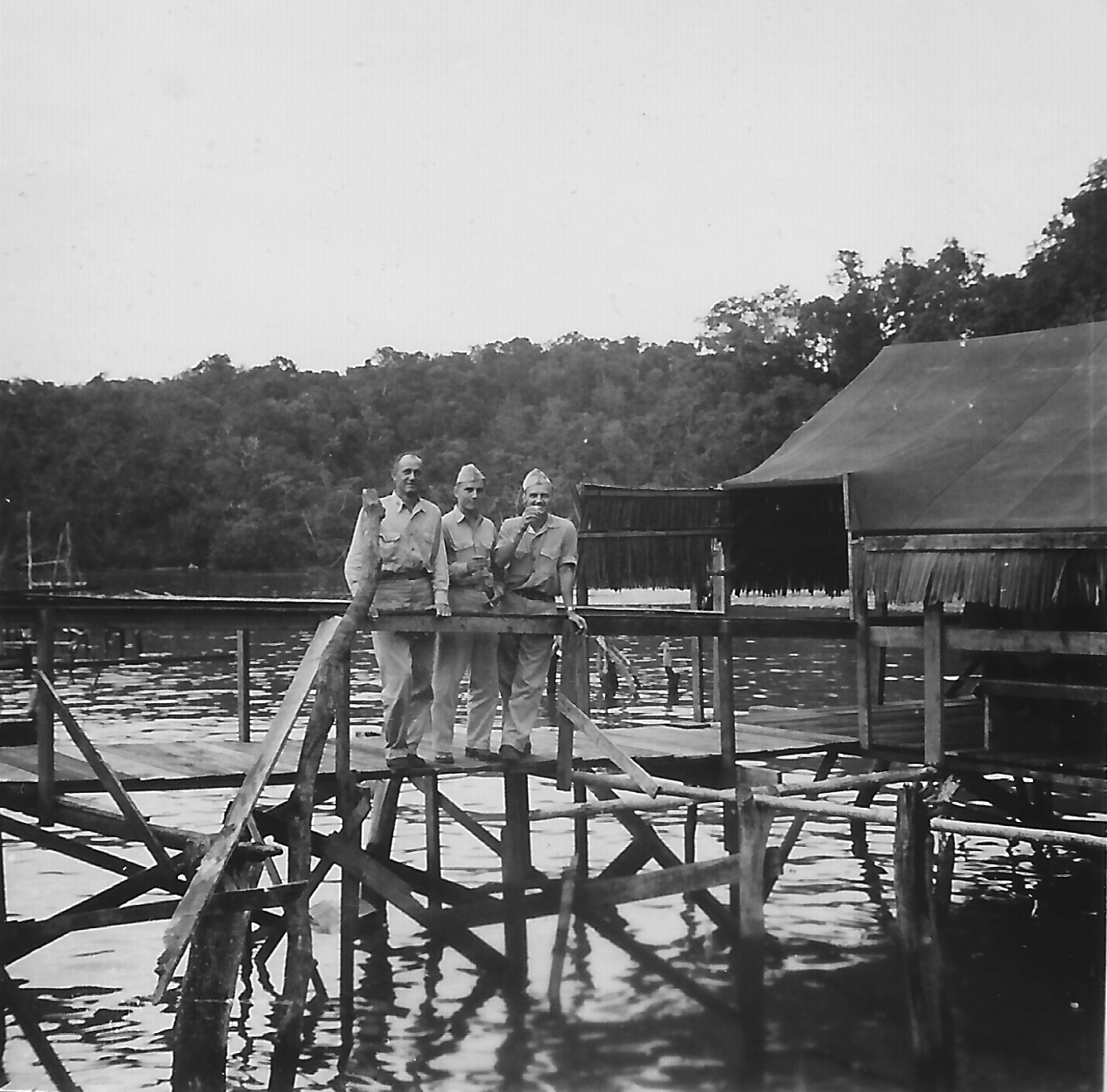
This 1944 officers' club was a bar for off-duty officers of the VII Amphibious Force ships. Despite its primitive appearance, the breeze off Yos Sudarso Bay brought relief from the smells and insects ashore.

An officers' club, known within the military as an O club, is an establishment similar to a gentlemen's club for commissioned officers of the armed forces. Few officers' clubs have survived the end of the Cold War.‍

== Origins ==
Officers' clubs are an artifact of the feudalism recognizing officers from the aristocratic European landowners as different from the peasants they commanded in military campaigns. Enlisted personnel recruited or inducted into military service remained ineligible for the privileges enjoyed by their officers while commissions awarded to graduates of officer training programs replaced commissions once given by royalty to the sons of their vassals.‍ This social distance was maintained to prevent officers from perceiving their enlisted personnel as friends. Warfare requires expenditure of lives, and officers responsible for ordering enlisted personnel into high-risk situations find it easier to risk lives they don't recognize as friends.‍

== 20th century ==
Maintaining the separation between officers and enlisted personnel is difficult in the remote places where military bases are built and battles are fought. There are few commercial recreational opportunities, and the financial resources of a few officers cannot match income possibilities these businesses realize from the larger number of enlisted personnel ready to pay for food, drinks, and sexual companionship. So the base facilities would include an officers' club where officers might relax in isolation from their enlisted personnel, and where intoxication might encourage tolerance for deviation from the customary deference of conversations between senior and subordinate officers.‍

Prohibition was a bleak time for officers' clubs in the United States. A bar was the essential element of most officers' clubs. Some served meals as an alternative to the rigid schedule and customs of the mess, and a few clubs on the larger bases hired musical entertainment during their busier hours.‍ Most officers' clubs paid operating expenses from the sale of alcoholic drinks. The most important part of their operating schedule was the happy hours beginning when the base work day ended.‍

The end of Prohibition restored normalcy to US officers' clubs, and was especially important on naval bases because the United States Navy continued to prohibit alcoholic beverages aboard ships. Unlike officers of the other armed services, officers living aboard ship could not drink in their quarters while off-duty. The best days of the officers' clubs began as mobilization for World War II funded construction of bases with officers' clubs sustained for half a century by military staffing levels maintained through the Cold War. These bases often included separate enlisted clubs, but the officers' club was usually built in the location with the best view and air circulation distant from noise, odors, dust or mud, while the preferred social distance often put the enlisted club in a significantly different location.‍ The protected environment of an officers' club offered refuge from public disapproval of the Vietnam War; so drinking at the officers' club became a preferred off-duty social activity for career officers.‍

== Decline ==
The civil rights movements focused on the perceived inequalities preserving that refuge, and the Tailhook Scandal of 1991 brought public attention to the problem of alcoholism within the military while the dissolution of the Soviet Union encouraged reduced military spending. United States military policy changes in response to political criticism included discouraging alcohol consumption and opening the officers' clubs to enlisted personnel. Many officers' clubs closed as they became unable to compete with civilian restaurants after a sharp decline in revenue from alcoholic drink sales.‍
