= Passport (band) =

German jazz fusion band

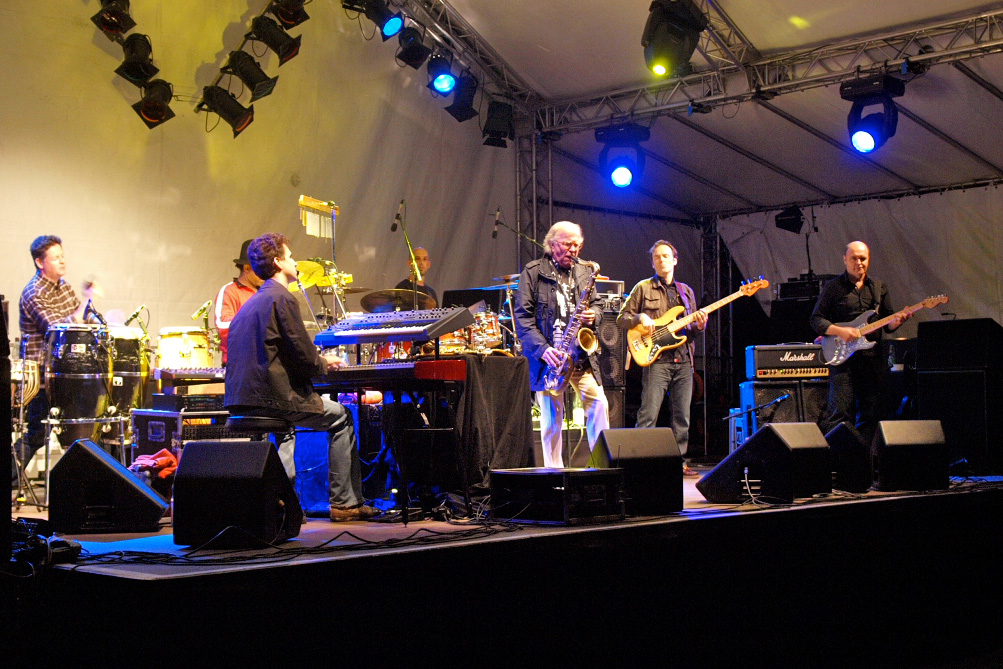
- Passport in the Offside Festival, Geldern, (2008).

Background information
- Origin: Munich, Germany
- Genres: Jazz fusion; progressive rock
- Years active: 1971–2021
- Labels: Atlantic, Warner, Atco
- Past members: Martin Scales; Patrick Scales; Michael Hornek; Christian Lettner; Biboul Darouiche; Ernst Ströer; Peter O'Mara; Brian Auger; Klaus Doldinger; Frank Roberts; Philip Catherine; Curt Cress; Johnny Griffin; Jim Jackson; Brian Spring; Willy Ketzer; Alexis Korner; Volker Kriegel; Olaf Kubler; Udo Lindenberg; Elmer Louis; Roy Louis; Lothar Meid; Alphonse Mouzon; Kevin Mulligan; Dieter Petereit; Hendrik Schaper; Wolfgang Schmid; John Mealing; Kristian Schultze; Vladislav Sendecki; Hermann Weindorf; Roykey Whydh; Pete York
- Website: www.passportjazz.com

Passport was a German jazz fusion ensemble led by saxophonist Klaus Doldinger. Formed in 1971, their first recording was issued the same year. The band's membership had had numerous changes over the years. The lineup that brought them to European and international prominence in the mid 1970s consisted of Doldinger, drummer Curt Cress, guitarist/bassist Wolfgang Schmid and keyboardist Kristian Schultze. The group has recorded for Atlantic and Warner Bros.

== Members ==
=== Past ===
- Martin Scales – guitar
- Patrick Scales – bass
- Michael Hornek
- Christian Lettner
- Biboul Darouiche
- Ernst Ströer
- Brian Auger – keyboards
- Klaus Doldinger - saxophone, flute, keyboards
- Frank Roberts - keyboards
- Philip Catherine – guitar
- Curt Cress – drums
- Johnny Griffin
- Jim Jackson – drums
- Brian Spring - drums
- Willy Ketzer – drums
- Alexis Korner – guitar, vocals
- Volker Kriegel – guitar
- Olaf Kubler – saxophone, flute
- Udo Lindenberg – drums
- Elmer Louis
- Roy Louis
- Lothar Meid – bass
- Alphonse Mouzon – drums
- Kevin Mulligan – guitar
- Dieter Petereit (de) – bass
- Hendrik Schaper
- Wolfgang Schmid – bass, guitar
- Kevin Mulligan – guitar
- Peter O'Mara – guitar
- John Mealing - keyboards
- Kristian Schultze – keyboards
- Vladislav Sendecki – keyboards
- Hermann Weindorf – keyboards, vocals
- Roykey Whydh – guitar
- Pete York – drums

== Discography ==
- Passport (Atlantic, 1971)
- Second Passport (Atlantic, 1972)
- Looking Thru (Atlantic, 1973)
- Hand Made (Atlantic, 1973)
- Doldinger Jubilee Concert (Atlantic, 1974)
- Doldinger Jubilee '75 (Atlantic, 1975)
- Cross-Collateral (Atlantic, 1975) U.S. No. 137
- Infinity Machine (Atlantic, 1976)
- Iguacu (Atlantic, 1977) U.S. No. 191, U.S. Jazz No. 23
- Ataraxia (titled Sky Blue in the US) (Atlantic, 1978) U.S. No. 140, U.S. Jazz No. 12
- Garden of Eden (Atlantic, 1979) U.S. Jazz No. 17
- Lifelike with Klaus Doldinger (Atlantic, 1980)
- Oceanliner (Atlantic, 1980) U.S. No. 163, U.S. Jazz No. 14
- Blue Tattoo (Atlantic, 1981) U.S. No. 175, U.S. Jazz No. 14
- Earthborn (Atlantic, 1982) U.S. Jazz No. 40
- Man in the Mirror (WEA, 1983)
- Running in Real Time (WEA, 1985)
- Heavy Nights (WEA, 1986)
- Talk Back (WEA, 1988)
- Balance of Happiness (WEA, 1990)
- Blues Roots (WEA, 1991)
- Down to Earth (WEA, 1993)
- Passport to Paradise (WEA, 1996)
- Move (WEA, 1998)
- Live with Klaus Doldinger (WEA, 2000)
- Back to Brazil (Warner, 2003)
- Passport to Morocco (Warner, 2006)
- On Stage (Warner, 2008)
- Inner Blue (Warner, 2011)
- En Route (Warner, 2015)
- Doldinger (Warner, 2016)
- Motherhood (Warner, 2020)
