= Tete =

Tete may refer to:

- Tete, Mozambique, a city in Mozambique
- Tété (born 1975), a French musician
- Tetê (born 2000), a Brazilian footballer
- Tete Montoliu (1933–1997), Spanish jazz pianist
  - Tete!, an album by Tete Montoliu
- Tete Province, a province of Mozambique
- Zolani Tete (1988–2026), a South African boxer

== See also ==
- Tête (disambiguation)
- Tête à Tête (disambiguation)
