= Billy Lewis Brooks =

American jazz percussion player

- Born: Billie Lee Lewis; 25 May 1943; United States
- Died: 21 August 2023 (aged 80) Germany
- Genres: Jazz
- Occupation: Musician
- Instruments: Percussion, flute

Billy Lewis Brooks (born Billie Lee Lewis; 25 May 1943 – 21 August 2023) was an American jazz percussionist and flautist.

== Biography ==
Brooks moved to Europe in 1964. From 1972 until his retirement in 2008 he taught percussion at the Swiss Jazz School in Bern, Switzerland, which was later part of the Bern Academy of Arts.

In the mid-1960s he collaborated with jazz organist Larry Young as part of an influential expatriate circle in Europe, most notably alongside trumpeter Woody Shaw and tenor saxophonist Nathan Davis in Paris, which can be heard on the album “Larry Young in Paris” posthumously released in 2016.

In 1966, Brooks played in the quartet of Swedish trombonist Eje Thelin. At the beginning of 1970's, he founded the group El Babaku with the bass player Bert Thompson in Berlin, recording one album, Live At The Jazz Galerie, in 1971 for the MPS label. He appeared on two albums with Fritz Pauer: Live At The Berlin "Jazz Galerie" (with Jimmy Woode; 1970) and Water Plants (1977). Other appearances and collaborations include those with the Slide Hampton/Joe Haider Orchestra, Tete Montoliu and Núria Feliu, Benny Bailey, Miriam Klein, Nathan Davis, Duško Gojković, Philip Catherine and Ximo Tebar.

Brooks died in Germany on 21 August 2023.

== Selected discography ==
With The Lou Bennett Trio

- Live At Club Saint-Germain (Vogue, 1980)

With Nathan Davis

- Happy Girl (SABA, 1965)

With El Babaku

- Live At The Jazz Galerie (MPS, 1971)

With Núria Feliu

- Núria Feliu (Edigsa, 1965) – with Booker Ervin, Tete Montoliu and Eric Peter

With Duško Gojković

- East Of Montenegro (Cosmic Sounds, 2003)

With Eddie Harris

- Cool Sax from Hollywood to Broadway (Columbia, 1964)

With Miriam Klein

- Lady Like (MPS, 1973) – with Roy Eldridge, Dexter Gordon and Slide Hampton

With Tete Montoliu

- A Tot Jazz (Concentric, 1965)
- A Tot Jazz/2 (Concentric, 1965)

With Horace Parlan

- One For Wilton (EGO, 1980)

With Fritz Pauer

- Live At The Berlin "Jazz Galerie" (MPS, 1970)
- Water Plants (EGO, 1977)

With Ximo Tebar

- So What! (WEA, 1997) – with Lonnie Smith
