= List of number-one albums in Spain from 1969 to 1979 =

The list of number-one albums in Spain from 1969 to 1979 is derived from the Top 100 España record chart published weekly by PROMUSICAE (Productores de Música de España), a non-profit organization composed by Spain and multinational record companies.

Albums are listed chronologically by the date each reached number one on the chart for the first time.

== Number-one albums of the 1970s ==
| Artist | Album | Reached number one | Weeks at number one |
|---|---|---|---|
| Nuestro Pequeño Mundo | El Folklore de Nuestro Pequeño Mundo | 31 March 1969 | 4 |
| Joan Manuel Serrat | La Paloma | 21 April 1969 | 7 |
| Joan Manuel Serrat | Dedicado a Antonio Machado, Poeta | 16 June 1969 | 22 |
| The Beatles | Abbey Road | 17 November 1969 | 11 |
| Ten Years After | Ssssh | 26 January 1970 | 3 |
| Led Zeppelin | Led Zeppelin | 9 February 1970 | 1 |
| John Mayall | The Turning Point | 16 March 1970 | 1 |
| Led Zeppelin | Led Zeppelin II | 23 March 1970 | 3 |
| Santana | Santana | 13 April 1970 | 6 |
| Simon & Garfunkel | Bridge over Troubled Water | 25 May 1970 | 20 |
| Varios Intérpretes | Fill Your Head with Rock | 29 June 1970 | 3 |
| Mari Trini | Amores | 2 November 1970 | 6 |
| José Feliciano | Fireworks | 14 December 1970 | 1 |
| Waldo de los Ríos | Sinfonías | 21 December 1970 | 11 |
| George Harrison | All Things Must Pass | 8 March 1971 | 8 |
| Francis Lai | Love Story | 3 May 1971 | 8 |
| Varios intérpretes | Rock 71 | 21 June 1971 | 2 |
| Paul McCartney | Ram | 12 July 1971 | 13 |
| The Rolling Stones | Sticky Fingers | 11 October 1971 | 1 |
| Carole King | Tapestry | 18 October 1971 | 3 |
| Mari Trini | Amores | 8 November 1971 | 3 |
| Emerson, Lake and Palmer | Tarkus | 22 November 1971 | 1 |
| Santana | Santana III | 6 December 1971 | 3 |
| Joan Manuel Serrat | Mediterráneo | 27 December 1971 | 21 |
| Mari Trini | Escúchame | 6 March 1972 | 10 |
| Juan Pardo | Natural | 24 July 1972 | 9 |
| The Rolling Stones | Exile On Main Street | 18 September 1972 | 3 |
| Elton John | Honky Château | 23 October 1972 | 4 |
| Emerson, Lake and Palmer | Trilogy | 20 November 1972 | 1 |
| Andy Williams | Love Theme from "The Godfather" | 27 November 1972 | 2 |
| Joan Manuel Serrat | Miguel Hernández | 11 December 1972 | 13 |
| Santana | Caravanserai | 26 February 1973 | 3 |
| Mari Trini | Ventanas | 2 April 1973 | 4 |
| Elton John | Don't Shoot Me I'm Only the Piano Player | 30 April 1973 | 2 |
| Raphael | Le llaman Jesús | 7 May 1973 | 2 |
| Mocedades | Mocedades 4 | 21 May 1973 | 1 |
| Nino Bravo | Mi tierra | 4 June 1973 | 6 |
| Paul Simon | There Goes Rhymin' Simon | 25 June 1973 | 1 |
| Juan Pardo | My guitar | 23 July 1973 | 3 |
| The Beatles | The Beatles 1962-1966 | 13 August 1973 | 3 |
| Paul McCartney and Wings | Red Rose Speedway | 3 September 1973 | 3 |
| George Harrison | Living in the Material World | 24 September 1973 | 2 |
| The Beatles | The Beatles 1967-1970 | 8 October 1973 | 1 |
| Nino Bravo | ...Y Vol. 5 | 15 October 1973 | 1 |
| Cat Stevens | Foreigner | 22 October 1973 | 9 |
| Deodato | Prelude | 29 October 1973 | 1 |
| Santana, Mahavishnu and John McLaughlin | Love Devotion Surrender | 5 November 1973 | 1 |
| Gaby, Fofó y Miliki con Fofito | Había una vez un circo | 7 January 1974 | 2 |
| The Rolling Stones | Goats Head Soup | 21 January 1974 | 1 |
| Ringo Starr | Ringo | 28 January 1974 | 2 |
| Camilo Sesto | Algo más | 11 February 1974 | 1 |
| Paul McCartney and Wings | Band on the Run | 18 February 1974 | 2 |
| Joan Manuel Serrat | Per al meu amic | 4 March 1974 | 8 |
| Joan Manuel Serrat | Canción infantil | 29 April 1974 | 14 |
| The Love Unlimited Orchestra | Rhapsody in White | 22 July 1974 | 4 |
| MFSB and others | El sonido de Filadelfia | 2 September 1974 | 10 |
| Rick Wakeman | Journey to the Centre of the Earth | 23 September 1974 | 3 |
| Paco de Lucía | Fuente y caudal | 2 December 1974 | 17 |
| Ted Neely/Yvonne Elliman/Carl Anderson and others | Jesus Christ Superstar (B.S.O. de la película) | 31 March 1975 | 28 |
| Paul McCartney and Wings | Venus and Mars | 13 October 1975 | 3 |
| Joan Manuel Serrat | ...Para piel de manzana | 3 November 1975 | 1 |
| Pink Floyd | Wish You Were Here | 10 November 1975 | 20 |
| Bob Dylan | Desire | 29 March 1976 | 23 |
| Lluís Llach | Barcelona, Gener de 1976 | 24 May 1976 | 1 |
| Santana | Amigos | 13 September 1976 | 9 |
| The Beatles | Rock 'n' Roll Music | 15 November 1976 | 5 |
| Donna Summer | A Love Trilogy | 6 December 1976 | 2 |
| The Beatles | Rock 'n' Roll Music | 3 January 1977 | 1 |
| Varios intérpretes | Los Súper 20 | 10 January 1977 | 2 |
| Jarcha | Libertad sin ira | 24 January 1977 | 2 |
| Peter Frampton | Frampton Comes Alive! | 7 February 1977 | 2 |
| The Ritchie Family | Arabian Nights | 21 February 1977 | 4 |
| Boney M | Take the Heat off Me | 21 March 1977 | 2 |
| Chicago | Chicago X | 4 April 1977 | 1 |
| Lluís Llach | Campanadas a morts | 4 April 1977 | 1 |
| Pink Floyd | Animals | 11 April 1977 | 8 |
| Eagles | Hotel California | 13 June 1977 | 11 |
| The Manhattan Transfer | Coming Out | 11 July 1977 | 4 |
| Boney M | Love for Sale | 26 September 1977 | 7 |
| Donna Summer | I Remember Yesterday | 14 November 1977 | 1 |
| Varios intérpretes | Los Súper 30 | 21 November 1977 | 5 |
| Supertramp | Even in the Quietest Moments... | 19 December 1977 | 1 |
| Elvis Presley | Sus 40 Mayores Éxitos Originales | 2 January 1978 | 5 |
| Supertramp | Even in the Quietest Moments... | 6 February 1978 | 10 |
| Bee Gees / Various artists | Saturday Night Fever: The Original Movie Sound Track | 17 April 1978 | 22 |
| Boney M | Nightflight to Venus | 18 September 1978 | 1 |
| John Travolta/Olivia Newton-John/Various artists | Grease (B.S.O. de la película) | 25 September 1978 | 15 |
| Enrique y Ana | El disco para los pequeños con Enrique y Ana | 1 January 1979 | 4 |
| Varios Intérpretes | La Guerra de los Mundos (Jeff Wayne's War of the Worlds) en español | 5 February 1979 | 3 |
| Rod Stewart | Blondes Have More Fun | 26 February 1979 | 5 |
| Bee Gees | Spirits Having Flown | 26 March 1979 | 7 |
| Supertramp | Breakfast in America | 21 May 1979 | 11 |
| Richard Clayderman | 16 Grandes Éxitos de Siempre | 16 July 1979 | 4 |
| Dire Straits | Communiqué | 6 August 1979 | 4 |
| Julio Iglesias | 24 Éxitos de Oro | 13 August 1979 | 1 |
| Varios Intérpretes | Disco de Oro de Epic, Vol. 2 | 20 August 1979 | 4 |
| Electric Light Orchestra | Discovery | 5 November 1979 | 4 |
| Boney M | Oceans of Fantasy | 3 December 1979 | 4 |
| Neil Diamond | 20 Diamond Hits | 31 December 1979 | 2 |

== See also ==
- List of number-one hits (Spain)
