= Face to Face =

Face to Face or Face 2 Face may refer to:

== Films ==
- Face to Face (1914 film), an American silent short film starring Miriam Nesbitt
- Face to Face (1922 film), an American silent mystery film starring Marguerite Marsh
- Face to Face (1952 film), an American two-part film
- Face to Face (1963 film) (Licem u Lice), a Croatian film
- Face to Face (1967 film) (Faccia a faccia), an Italian spaghetti western
- Face to Face (1976 film) (Ansikte mot ansikte), a Swedish film by Ingmar Bergman
- Face to Face (1979 film) (Ballë për Ballë), an Albanian drama
- Face to Face (1984 film) (Mukhamukham), a Malayalam film
- Face to Face (1990 film), a TV film presented by the Hallmark Hall of Fame
- Face to Face, a 2001 American film featuring Meat Loaf
- Face to Face (2011 film), an independent Australian film directed by Michael Rymer
- Face 2 Face (2012 Malayalam film), a mystery film starring Mammootty
- Face 2 Face (2012 American film), a documentary-styled film directed by Katherine Brooks
- Face 2 Face (2016 film), an American film starring Daniela Bobadilla
- Face to Face (2019 Sri Lankan film), an action thriller by Harsha Udakanda
- Face 2 Face (2019 Indian film), a romantic thriller by Sandeep Sanardhan
- Face to Face (2025 film), a Spanish drama directed by Javier Marco

== Literature ==
- Face to Face (Kulin novel), by Ayşe Kulin
- Face to Face (play), 2000, by David Williamson
- Face to Face, a novel by Ellery Queen
- Face to Face, a novel by Hall Bartlett
- Face to Face, a 1949 short story collection by Nadine Gordimer
- Face to Face, a novel by Robert Grant
- "Face to Face", a 1980s Sunday Times (South Africa) column by Jani Allan
- Face to Face: Polar Portraits, a photography and exploration book by Huw Lewis-Jones

== Music ==
=== Tours ===
- A series of tours by Elton John and Billy Joel from 1994 to 2010, starting with Face to Face 1994

=== Groups ===
- Face to Face (new wave band), a 1980s band from Boston
- Face to Face (punk band), a band from California

=== Albums ===
- Face to Face (The Angels album), 1978
- Face to Face (Baby Face Willette album), 1961
- Face to Face (Barclay James Harvest album), 1987
- Face to Face (Cissy Houston album), 1996
- Face to Face (Evelyn King album), 1983
- Face to Face (1984 Face to Face album)
- Face to Face (1996 Face to Face album)
- Face to Face (GQ album), 1981
- Face to Face (The Kinks album), 1966
- Face to Face (Oscar Peterson and Freddie Hubbard album), 1982
- Face to Face (Tete Montoliu and Niels-Henning Ørsted Pedersen album), 1982
- Face to Face (Trevor Rabin album), 1979
- Face to Face (Westlife album), 2005
- Face to Face: A Live Recording, by Steve Harley & Cockney Rebel, 1977
- Face 2 Face (2face Idibia album), 2004
- Face 2 Face (EP), by Cassidy, 2010
- Face2Face (Babyface album), 2001
- Twin Fantasy (Face to Face), Car Seat Headrest, 2018
- Face to Face, by 999, 1985
- Face to Face, by Bob Kilpatrick, 2000
- Face to Face, by Bounty Killer, 1994
- Face to Face, by Chemistry, 2008
- Face to Face, by The Dells, 1979
- Face to Face, by Frank Duval, 1982
- Face to Face, by Gary Burton and Makoto Ozone, 1995
- Face to Face, by Gino Soccio, 1982
- Face to Face, by Jagjit Singh, 1994
- Face to Face, by John Lee Hooker, 2004
- Face to Face, by Kevin Eubanks, 1986
- Face to Face, by Klinik, 1989
- Face to Face, by Richard Galliano and Eddy Louiss, 2001
- Face to Face, by Rick Derringer, 1980
- Face to Face, by Tiger Okoshi, 1989
- Face to Face, by Wayman Tisdale, 2001
- Face 2 Face, by Refugees of Rap, 2010

=== Songs ===
- "Face to Face" (Alabama song), 1987
- "Face to Face" (Barry Gibb and Olivia Newton-John song), 1984
- "Face to Face" (Daft Punk song), 2003
- "Face to Face" (Gary Barlow song), 2014
- "Face to Face" (Goodbye Mr. Mackenzie song), 1987
- "Face 2 Face" (Juice Wrld song), 2022
- "Face to Face" (KAT-TUN song), 2013
- "Face to Face" (Ruel song), 2019
- "Face to Face" (Sevendust song), 2004
- "Face to Face" (Siouxsie and the Banshees song), 1992
- "Face to Face", by 2 Unlimited from Real Things, 1994
- "Face to Face", by Loudness from Lightning Strikes, 1986
- "Face to Face", by Quiet Riot from Quiet Riot II, 1978
- "Face to Face", by Rex Orange County from Pony, 2019
- "Face to Face", by Yes from The Ladder, 1999
- "Face to Face", by the Vels from House of Miracles

== Television ==
=== Shows ===
- Face to Face (Australian TV program), a 1990s Australian political talk program
- Face to Face (British TV programme), a 1959–1962 British interview programme, revived 1989–1998
- Face to Face (Danish TV series), a 2019–2023 crime drama series, known as Forhøret in Denmark
- Face to Face (game show), a 1946–1947 American game show that aired on NBC
- Face 2 Face (talk show), a 2010 Philippine talk show program

=== Episodes ===
- "Face to Face", a 1955 episode of I Love Lucy
- "Face to Face", an episode of Jason of Star Command
- "Face to Face", a 1997 episode of Night Man
- "Face to Face", an episode of The Better Woman
- "Face to Face", an episode of The Stoneman Murders

== Other uses ==
- Face-to-face, also known as Face-me-I-face-you, a type of residential real estate, where a group of one-room apartments have their entrances facing each other
- Face to Face (photograph), a photograph of two warriors staring each other down during the Oka Crisis
- Face-to-face (philosophy), a philosophical concept described by Emmanuel Lévinas based on the idea that people are responsible to one another in their face-to-face encounters
- Face-to-face interaction, a concept in sociology, linguistics and communication studies involving social interaction carried out without any mediating technology
- face2face (software), an application to help mobile users identify when members of their social networks are nearby within walking distance
- Face to Face, in Christianity, a type of three-day movement

== See also ==
- F2F (disambiguation)
- "Face the Face", a song by Pete Townshend from White City: A Novel
- Face time, interaction between two or more people at the same time and place
- Friend-to-friend, a type of peer-to-peer computer network
- Tête à Tête (disambiguation)
- Aamne Samne (disambiguation)
