= Swiss Jazz Orchestra =

The Swiss Jazz Orchestra is a big band that was founded in 2003. Though the band has seen many changes, there are still some of its initial members. The orchestra's origins lie in the Big Band of the Swiss Jazz School, the oldest college for jazz music in Switzerland (which has been part of the Art School of Bern Hochschule der Künste Bern since 2003). One of the orchestra's features is Monday Jazz Nights, a series of concerts which take place every Monday night at the venue Bierhübeli in Bern. The Swiss Jazz Orchestra celebrated its 10th anniversary in the 2013–2014 season. The Swiss Jazz Orchestra has worked with Anders Bergcrantz, Jerry Bergonzi, Buddy DeFranco, Torun Eriksen, George Gruntz, Joe Haider, Bert Joris, Pepe Lienhard, Jim McNeely, Adrian Mears, Bob Mintzer, Sandy Patton, Chico Pinheiro, Paquito D'Rivera, Claudio Roditi, Alex Sipiagin, and Phil Woods.

== History ==
Members of the Big Band of the Swiss Jazz School (SJS) in Bern grew tired of losing the graduating and now excellent musicians decided to create a Big Band to continue playing together later on. That's when the Swiss Jazz Orchestra (SJO) was founded. During the first season, orchestra performed Marian's Jazzroom in Bern.

== Organization ==
One of the reasons this anniversary can be celebrated is also thanks to the roots that the Bernese surgeon and jazz insider Ulrich Althaus planted for this orchestra: He founded the Association Swiss Jazz Orchestra (Verein Swiss Jazz Orchestra (VSJO)) on February 9, 2004. The purpose of the association is to lay a financial and administrative basis for the SJO. Althaus caught attention and support for that project from the public.

Following Ulrich Althaus, Hans Rudolf Isliker took on the role as president of the Association Swiss Jazz Orchestra (VSJO) until in 2012 Peter Knutti was elected president of the VSJO. For many years, musicians from the band did the management themselves (Till Grünewald, Klaus Widmer, Johannes Walter, Thomas Knuchel), until in 2012 Angela Schenker was hired as part-time manager. With Peter Knutti and the musician's deputies they form the business administration.

== Monday Big Band Jazz Nights ==
Monday Big Band Jazz Nights are a series of concerts that take place every Monday night at the Bierhübeli in Bern. The series has a rotation of different themes (Latin, Tribute, Gala, and Groove Night), which give the orchestra the opportunity to practice its skills in different styles.

The Swiss Jazz Orchestra is the only big band in Switzerland that performs a series of concerts on a regular basis. It means great effort to work on an at least partially new repertoire each week. The Monday Big Band Jazz Nights form the backbone and help realize other advanced projects that include CD productions and touring in Switzerland and abroad.

The program of the Monday Big Band Jazz Nights contains a rotation of four different themes: Groove-Night focusses on tricky and unusual rhythms. Latin Night takes the audience to Latin-American spheres. Furthermore, the SJO has obtained a diverse repertoire of the most different stylistics by all kinds of well-known composers. Once each month, a particular artist or a more general subject that derives from the history of jazz is featured in Tribute-Night. The fourth category of concerts is the Gala Night. For these concerts, a guest is invited who enriches the program through his or her own music, expertise, and personality.

== Musical direction ==
It is very unusual for an orchestra to have not one, but multiple leaders who derive from the orchestra itself. Philip Henzi explains the reasons for that as follows: "Why there is not only one musical leader goes back to the early days of its foundation: The orchestra has been founded by three people. Because we appreciate and depend on the impetus, the motivation and ideals of each band member, we try to have all interests of the band represented democratically amongst the musical leaders. Presumably that is the reason for the consistency in the line-up of our musicians. Furthermore, the large number of tasks (concerning the preparation of programs, the communication with guest-soloists and also the coordination of the rehearsals) makes it almost impossible for one person alone to manage it."

- Leaders: Stefan Schlegel, Johannes Walter, Philip Henzi, Lukas Thöni, Dave Blaser, Andreas Tschopp, Jürg Bucher
- Former leaders: George Robert, Stephan Geiser, Daniel Woodtli

== Albums ==
Different musical leaders contributed to the making of different albums, ranging from live concerts conducted by the Swiss Jazz legend Pepe Lienhard (Live mit Pepe Lienhard, Mons, 2005) to collaborations with pop singers with a nationwide reputation, such as Sina, Polo Hofer and Kuno Lauener (I schänke dir mis Härz on Buebetröim, 2007/2009).

The album Paul Klee (2006) in cooperation with the American pianist and composer Jim McNeely has been the most challenging for the orchestra so far. The compositions were inspired by the drawings and paintings of the Bern-based artist Paul Klee and the CD gained national and international appreciation. For the album Buebetröim ("Boys' dreams"), the SJO asked singers Büne Huber and Sina to join their production. In 2008, the SJO recorded another CD with Camerata Bern, Markus Stockhausen and Philip Henzi which bears the name Tanzendes Licht & Trimorphum ("Dancing Light & Trimorphum") (Aktivraum AG). The guest-soloist on Close Encounter (Mons, 2009) was the Swiss/Argentinian bandoneon player Michael Zisman.

It almost seems like the orchestra tried to quote itself or to recall its roots, when, in 2012 Bert Joris resumed to play a big role in leading the band for the recording of Lucidity 25 years after he obtained the leadership of the Jazz-School-Conservatoire Big Band. Concerning all the recordings, it is important to draw attention to Philip Henzi: Each and every CD of the Swiss Jazz Orchestra contains arrangements, most of the albums also compositions of his. Lucidity has entirely been composed by him, a humorous element apparent in many of the titles.

Two albums were released in 2013: one is a live album recorded during the 38th International Jazzfestival Bern at Marian's Jazzroom and features Argentinian-Swiss bandoneon player Michael Zisman, Cuban saxophonist Paquito d'Rivera and Brazilian trumpeter Claudio Roditi. The second was released in 2013 named Sincerely Yours and offers a cross section of the repertoire from concerts. The title aims at the audience, the ones that make the anniversary of the band possible and ensure the continuation of the band's ambitions.

== Cultural award ==
Kulturpreis 2010 der Burgergemeinde Bern

The cultural prize of the Burgergemeinde (engl. Inherited Citizen Community) of the city of Bern is awarded once a year to a group or an organization or a cultural institution for outstanding contribution to the welfare of cultural life in Bern. In 2010 the prize was awarded to the Swiss Jazz Orchestra. The committee especially honored the success story of the SJO, which is founded on the Monday Big Band Nights at the venue Bierhübeli in Bern. During a period of eight months of each year, these concerts are performed in a unique frequency and quality. Two other aspects were honored: first the international reputation of the orchestra, resulting from the long lasting cooperation with famous bandleaders, composers and musicians, second the fact that the musicians – despite earning a humble salary – play top-class concerts, a sign for their commitment. The cultural award also influenced the Swiss Jazz Orchestra itself, planning an ambitious future. On one hand, the prize can be considered as a reward, on the other hand the orchestra is bound to invest in a sustainable future. The SJO wants to increase its offering of being a platform for the very best young Jazz-musicians, so that they can demonstrate their abilities as artists in a segment, that has gained a higher reputation by the modern system. Also, the orchestra makes the invitation of more special guests of sounding name their business to attract more people. Future projects are planned to strengthen the role of the orchestra in the top league.

== Members ==
The lineup of the Swiss Jazz Orchestras changed a lot throughout the ten years since it was founded: While some chairs still bare the original musicians that started the band in the first place, some positions had quick changes. The list of former band members is therefore pretty diversified:

=== Saxophones ===
- Lead Alto: George Robert (until 2006), Adrian Pflugshaupt
- 2. Alto: Phil Stöckli (until 2004), Adrian Pflugshaupt (2004–2006), Jürg Bucher (2007–2010), Reto Suhner (since 2011)
- 1. Tenor: Till Grünewald
- 2. Tenor: Klaus Widmer (until 2011), Jürg Bucher
- Baritone: Daniel Durrer (until 2004), Neta Noren (2004 bis 2007), Marc Schödler

=== Trumpets ===
- Lead: Stephan Geiser (until 2011), David Blaser
- 2. tp: Johannes Walter
- 3. tp: Daniel Woodtli (until 2012), Lukas Thoeni
- 4. tp: Thomas Knuchel

=== Trombones ===
- Lead: Vincent Lachat
- 2. tb: René Mosele (until 2007), Stefan Schlegel (seit 2008)
- 3. tb: Samuel Blaser (until 2004), Bernhard Bamert (2004–2007), Andreas Tschopp
- Bass tb: Bernhard Bamert (until 2004), Reto Zumstein

=== Rhythm section ===
- Piano: Philip Henzi
- Guitar: Nick Perrin (since 2006), Nikolay Karageorgiev (2010–2012)
- Double Bass: Lorenz Beyeler
- E-Bass: Wolfgang Zwiauer (2004–2008), Antonio Schiavano
- Drums: Tobias Friedli (since 2003), Fabian Kuratli (2004–2007), Rico Baumann (since 2007)
- Percussion: Roland Wäger (since 2010)

=== Substitutes ===
- Following musicians have played as subs for one or more concerts of the SJO, some of them for entire projects:
- Saxes: Reto Anneler, Florian Egli, Dave Feusi, Thomi Geiger, Cédric Gschwind, Rolf Häsler, Matthias Kohler, Simon Stirnimann, Corinne Windler
- Trumpets: Sandro Häsler, Julian Hesse, Linus Hunkeler, Nolan Quinn, Balthasar Streit
- Trombones: Dirk Amrein, Lukas Briggen, Justin Clark, Dave Montreuil, Pavel Pisanko, Jan Schreiner, Nina Thöni, Adrian Weber, Maro Widmer, Lukas Wyss
- Piano: Stefan Aeby, Florian Favre, Oliver Friedli, Andy Harder
- Guitar: Marco Figini, Max Frankl, Fabio Pinto, Thomas Sauter
- Double Bass/E-Bass: Giorgos Antoniou, Hans Ermel, André Pousaz, Christoph Utzinger
- Drums/Percussion: Pius Baschnagel, Peter Haas, Christoph Mohler, David Stauffacher

=== Engineers ===
- Michael Fink, Kaspar Hochuli, Marco Jeger, Raphael Ochsenbein, Martin Ruch, Jan Stehle, Christoph Utzinger

== Discography ==
- Live mit Pepe Lienhard (Mons, 2005)
- Paul Klee (Mons, 2006)
- Buebetroeim Vol. 1 (Musikvertrieb, 2007)
- Tanzendes Licht (Aktivraum, 2008)
- Close Encounter (Mons, 2009)
- Buebetroeim Vol. 2 (Musikvertrieb AG, 2009)
- Lucidity (Mons, 2011)
- Live@Jazzfestival Bern (Mons, 2014)
- Sincerely Yours (2014)
- Pools (Mons, 2016)
