= Joe Nay =

German jazz musician

Joe Nay (May 10, 1934, in Berlin – December 22, 1990, near Munich) was a German jazz musician, composer and drummer.

After studying guitar at the Berlin Conservatory, Nay studied under Kenny Clarke in Paris in 1959. Together with the pianist Jan Huydts and the bassist Peter Trunk, he founded the house band at the Berlin club Blue Note in the 1960s. This trio accompanied American musicians such as Roland Kirk, Don Byas, Dexter Gordon and Johnny Griffin.

He also played in the Michael Naura Quintet and, alongside Hartwig Bartz, Ralf Hübner and Klaus Weiss, developed into one of the most important German jazz drummers.

Later he played with Dusko Goykovich, Randy Brecker, Volker Kriegel, Ruby Braff and Jasper van't Hof. His Northern Lights ensemble, active at the end of the 1970s, included Johannes Faber, Andy Scherrer, Harry Pepl, Christoph Spendel and Adelhard Roidinger. In the 1980s he directed the group Message, in which musicians such as Harry Sokal and Paul Grabowsky played. He has worked on more than 80 LP or CD recordings.

He died from the consequences of an auto accident.

His son, Sebastian Nay, is also jazz drummer who works with the pianist Tine Schneider.

== Discography ==
As leader

- Message (1986)

As sideman

- Barbara Dennerlein: Be-Bab, 1985
- Wilton Gaynair: Alpharian, 1982
- Dusko Goykovich: It's About Blues Time, 1971
- Dusko Goykovich: After Hours, 1971
- Johnny Griffin: Body & Soul, 1990
- Dick Heckstall-Smith: Live 1990, with John Etheridge, Rainer Glas 1990
- Jan Huydts: Trio Conception, 1963
- Carmell Jones: Carmell Jones in Europe, 1969
- Volker Kriegel: Mild Maniac, 1974
- Volker Kriegel: Topical Harvest, 1975
- Tete Montoliu: Body & Soul (Enja, 1971 [1983])
- Tete Montoliu: It's About Blues Time, 1971
- Tete Montoliu: Recordando A Line, 1971
- Michael Naura: Michael Naura Quintet, 1963
- Michael Naura: Call, 1970
- Michael Naura: Rainbow Runner, 1973
- Fritz Pauer: Beat The Beat, 1966
- Fritz Pauer & Joe Nay: The Rambler, 1966
- Dieter Reith: Join Us, 1978
- Annie Ross & Pony Poindexter: Annie Ross and Pony Poindexter, 1966
- Kristian Schultze: Recreation, 1972
- Peter Trunk: Sincerely P. T., 1973
- Utopia: Utopia, 1973 (with Jimmy Jackson, Kristian Schulze, Olaf Kübler, Lothar Meid and other Amon Düül II members)
