= Video manipulation =

Editing of video content for malicious intent

A deepfake video of Vladimir Putin speaking about election interference, created in 2020 by nonpartisan advocacy group RepresentUs

Video manipulation is a type of media manipulation that targets digital video using video processing and video editing techniques. The applications of these methods range from educational videos to videos aimed at (mass) manipulation and propaganda, a straightforward extension of the long-standing possibilities of photo manipulation. This form of computer-generated misinformation has contributed to fake news, and there have been instances when this technology was used during political campaigns to create confusion and/or promote misleading information. Other uses are less sinister; entertainment purposes and harmless pranks provide users with movie-quality artistic possibilities.

== History ==
The concept of manipulating video can be traced back as far as the 1950s when the 2-inch Quadruplex tape used in videotape recorders would be manually cut and spliced. After being coated with ferrofluid, the two ends of tape that were to be joined were painted with a mixture of iron filings and carbon tetrachloride, a toxic and carcinogenic compound to make the tracks in the tape visible when viewed through a microscope so that they could be aligned in a splicer designed for this task

As the video cassette recorder developed in the 1960s, 1970s, 1980s, and 1990s, the ability to record over an existing magnetic tape became possible. This led to the concept of overlaying specific parts of film to give the illusion of one consistently recorded video, which is the first identifiable instance of video manipulation.

In 1985, Quantel released The Harry, the first all-digital video editing and effects compositing system. It recorded and applied effects to a maximum of 80 seconds of 8-bit uncompressed digital video. A few years later, in 1991, Adobe released its first version of Premiere for the Mac, a program that has since become an industry standard for editing and is now commonly used for video manipulation. In 1999, Apple released Final Cut Pro, which competed with Adobe Premiere and was used in the production of major films such as The Rules of Attraction and No Country for Old Men.

Face detection became a major research subject in the early 2000s that has continued to be studied in the present. In 2017, an amateur coder named “DeepFakes” was altering pornography videos by digitally substituting the faces of celebrities for those in the original videos. The word deepfake has become a generic noun for the use of algorithms and facial-mapping technology to manipulate videos.

On the consumer side, popular video manipulation programs FaceApp and Faceswap, developed from similar technology, have become increasingly sophisticated.

The proof-of-principle software Face2Face was developed at the University of Erlangen-Nuremberg, the Max-Planck Institute for Informatics, and Stanford University. Such advanced video manipulation must be ranked alongside and beyond previous examples of deepfakes.

== Types of video manipulation ==
Computer applications are becoming more advanced in terms of being able to generate fake audio and video content that looks real. A video published by researchers depicts how video and audio manipulation works using facial recognition. Though video manipulation could be thought of as piecing together different video clips, the types of video manipulation extend further than that. For example, an actor can sit in front of a camera moving his face. The computer then generates the same facial movement in real time on an existing video of Barack Obama. When the actor shakes his head, Obama also shakes his head, and the same happens when the actor speaks. Not only does this create fake content, but it masks the content as even more authentic than other types of fake news, as video and audio were once the most reliable types of media for many people.

One of the most dangerous parts of video manipulation is the concept of politics; campaign videos are being manipulated to pose a threat to other nations. Dartmouth College computer science professor Hany Farid commented on video manipulation and its dangers. Farid said that actors could generate videos of Trump claiming to launch nuclear weapons. These fabricated videos could be shared on social media before the mistake can be fixed, possibly resulting in war. Despite the presence of manipulated video and audio, research teams are working to combat the issue. Prof. Christian Theobalt, a member of a team working on the technology at the Max-Planck-Institute for informatics in Germany, states that researchers have created forensic methods to detect fakes.

The Washington Post's fact-checking team has identified six forms of video manipulation, classified into three categories:

1. Missing context
  - Misrepresentation: Placing original video footage into an incorrect context to misinform the audience
  - Isolation: Publishing a short segment from a video that presents a different narrative than the full video
2. Deceptive editing
  - Omission: Removing major segments from a video to present a different story
  - Splicing: Combining segments from different videos to form a narrative not supported by any of the individual videos
3. Malicious transformation
  - Doctoring: Directly modifying video frames
  - Fabrication: Using technology to construct bogus videos, such as deepfakes

== Video manipulation and fake news ==
With fake news becoming increasingly prominent in popular culture and with rapid advancements in audio and video manipulation technology, the public is increasingly encountering fake news that is supported by deceptive videos. In terms of types of fake news, the potential to be classified is ever-expanding but includes five main types — satire or parody, selective reporting, sloppy journalism, clickbait, and conspiracies. Though the five main types of fake news are prominent globally, one of the most destructive types of fake news lies within all five types and is video and audio manipulation. Video and audio manipulation are defined as a new variant of media manipulation that targets digital video using a combination of traditional video processing and video editing techniques with auxiliary methods from artificial intelligence like face recognition. The results range from artistic videos produced for aesthetic effects to videos aimed at (mass) manipulation and propaganda, a straightforward extension of the long-standing possibilities of photo manipulation.

== Digital fakes ==
A digital fake refers to a digital video, photo, or audio file that has been altered or manipulated by digital application software. Deepfake videos fall within the category of digital fake media, but a video may be digitally altered without being considered a deepfake. The alterations can be done for entertainment purposes, or for more nefarious purposes such as spreading disinformation. The information can be used to conduct malicious attacks, political gains, financial crimes, or fraud.

== Regulation ==
Due to the social and political impacts caused by deepfakes, many national states have implemented regulations to combat these effects of video manipulation. Technical regulations range from real-name verification requirements, labeling information, censorships, and banning synthetic images, audio, and video.

=== China ===
China issued the "Provision on the Administration of Deep Synthesis Internet Information Service" on January 28, 2022. China's State Internet Information Office enforced this regulation as a way to control manipulated content on the Internet and increase technological stability within the Chinese Communist Party (CCP). There are 25 articles in total and each article section ultimately explains the terms and conditions of the regulation itself.

"Article 5: Encourage relevant industry organizations to strengthen industry self-discipline, establish and improve industry standards, industry guidelines, and self-regulatory management systems, supervise and guide deep synthesis service providers to formulate and improve service specifications, strengthen information content security management, provide services in accordance with the law, and accept social supervision."

One of the policy articles that were mentioned in Emmie Hine and Luciano Floridi's text was Article 5, which goes over that while the government will look over the information being posted publicly, industry corporations are also responsible for keeping track of content that is published on their social platforms. This particular policy pushes companies in China to be more aware of what is shown online because if not, the companies themselves will be fined.

=== European Union ===
The European Union (EU) enacted its Artificial Intelligence Act (AI Act) in 2024. An early version of the act was first drafted in 2021, but the speed at which AI was progressing made it difficult to create specific regulations. Ultimately, the EU's AI Act categorizes AI technologies based on risk, ranging from "unacceptable" to high, medium, and low hazard. Additionally, the EU requires companies to label AI-generated images, audio, and text designed to look authentic with "a digital watermark to show the artificial origins of the content".

=== United States ===
The United States issued the "DEEP FAKES Accountability Act" in 2019. However, Hine and Luciano stated this policy only prevents the act around "unauthorized digital recreations of people". This established bill ultimately puts criminal penalties for related impersonations and pornography violations. Because of this regulation, many well-known platforms like Facebook and Twitter began to removed unlawful information that violated the policy and even require labeling regulations.

== Video manipulation market failures ==
Some of the main reasons why large national states like the United States and China are implementing video manipulation regulations/policies are because of market failures. In particular, market failures revolve around the topics of public goods and negative externalities. Public goods refer to products and services that can be used by everyone. On the other hand, negative externalities are negative actions that affect someone who did not fully consent or was not involved with the situation.

=== Public goods ===
Synthetic information, including content taken by Deepfake, is shown and available to everyone in the public eye (characteristics of general public goods). Because of the easy and worldwide access, misinformation is spread rapidly and sometimes out of control. In turn, lawmakers and governmental organizations create policies that control what is being put on the internet. One example that explicitly demonstrates content being "over-consumed" within society is "The Voice of April" event. The Voice of April was a day when numerous videos of Shanghai citizens were being censored and banned during COVID-19. However, because these videos were published on the Internet, they continued to circulate throughout China and some people even made different versions when the original content got deleted. Covered in MIT Technology Review, Zeyi Yang informed that videos being censored by the government were re-uploaded into copies and stored through outside social platforms. Due to the challenges faced by the open-access content published online, nations continue to implement more regulations to maintain verified information.

=== Negative externalities ===
Video manipulation essentially creates fake scenarios that never happened. As a result of this act, many people can be impacted by synthetic information despite not being directly part of the scene. Jack Langa states in a Law Journal article that "a bad actor could take advantage of region's instability by using a deepfake to inflame a local population, which could lead to civilian casualties..." One example that showcases negative externalities from misleading/manipulated information is the January 6, 2021 attack on the US Capitol. This event led to approximately 140 police officers being assaulted (noted by the United States Department of Justice). However, Judy Woodruff declared in a PBS News Hours that the whole incident was caused by a big lie about election fraud in 2020. Even though the situation was based on manipulated content, it ultimately led to numerous officers being harmed in the process.
