= Ximo Tebar =

Spanish jazz musician (born 1963)

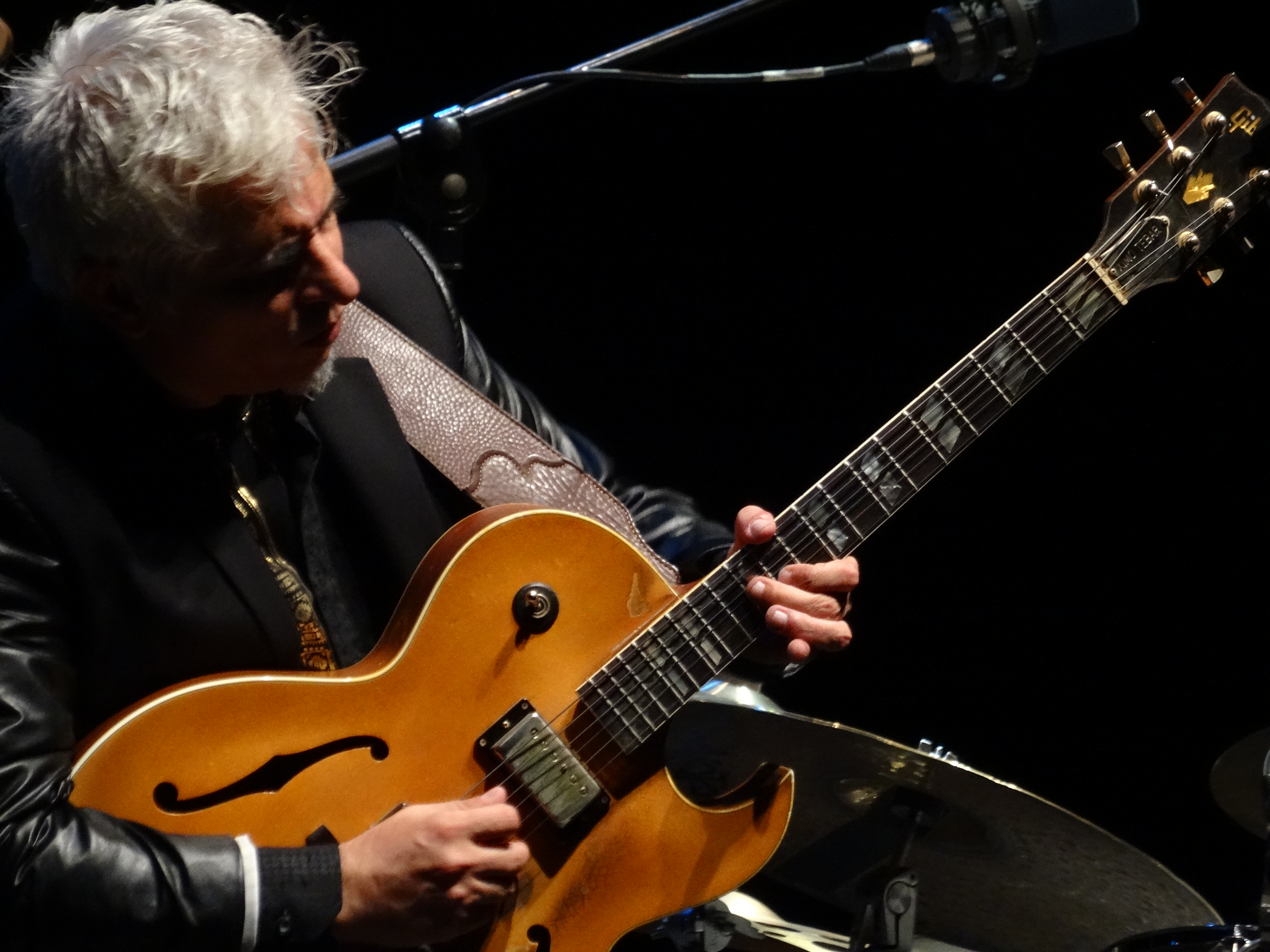
- Ximo Tebar, was a Spanish jazz musician and a guitarist.

Background information
- Born: March 30, 1963 (age 63); Valencia; Spain
- Genres: jazz
- Occupation: Musician
- Instrument: guitar
- Website: ximotebar.net

Ximo Tebar (March 30, 1963 in Valencia) is a Spanish jazz musician (guitar, composition).

== Life and works ==
Tebar started taking guitar lessons at the age of seven. His first music genre was flamenco. At the age of 15, he was attracted to Brazilian music. When he was 17, he decided to take up a career in the professional music and founded his own Jazz Group. He won with his group the international competition of the jazz festival Getxo in 1990. In 1989, he played as the representative of Spain in the big band of EBU.

Since then, Tebar made regularly international tours with his band or as a solo guitarist. Also, he performed with Lou Bennett in Europe in 1992. In 1995, he made a record contract with Warner Brothers. In 1997, he made a tour with Lou Donaldson, Lonnie Smith, Idris Muhammad and Billy Lewis Brooks. His album Goes Blue, which was published with his own label Omix, was praised as an excellent work by critics. In 2002, he appeared for the first time in the New York jazz club, Birdland. At the end of 2003, he moved to New York for working with Arturo O'Farrill and the Afro Cuban Jazz Orchestra of Chico O'Farrill. he has produced also albums for David Schnitter and Ester Andujar. Besides, he has worked with Johnny Griffin, Benny Golson, Joe Lovano, Tom Harrell, Tete Montoliu, Anthony Jackson, Louie Bellson, Pedro Iturralde or Jan Akkerman.

With IVAM jazz ensemble, founded on the initiative of the Museum of Modern Art in Valencia, Tebar merged Erik Satie's music with flamenco jazz. He has collaborated also with Joc Fora, Ricardo Belda, Lou Bennett (Now Hear My Meaning), Presuntos Implicados, Roque Martinez and David Pastor.

== Awards and honors ==
Tebar as a soloist and as a member of this group was awarded Muestra Nacional de Jazz by the ministry of Culture in 1989 and 1990. His group won the competition of Getxo in 1990. In 2001 and 2002, his band was awarded Premio Jazz Promusics as the best group. The album Homepage achieved this award again in 2001. In 2007, he was appreciated by the award for extraordinary performance in the field of jazz education of the International Association for Jazz Education.

== Discography ==
- Live in Russia (DM 1991)
- Hello Mr. Bennett (DM, 1993)
- Son Mediterraneo (WEA, 1995)
- So What! (WEA, 1997)
- Homepage (WEA, 1998)
- Goes Blue (Nuevos Medios, 2001)
- Anis Del Gnomo (Omix, 2002)
- Te Kiero Con K (Omix, 2002)
- Embrujado (Omix, 2003)
- The Champs (Sunnyside, 2004)
- Eclipse (Sunnyside, 2006)
- Steps (Omix, 2008)
- Celebrating Erik Satie (Xabia Jazz, 2009)
- A Jazzy World Christmas (Omix, 2010)
