= Words of Love (disambiguation) =

"Words of Love" is a 1957 song written by Buddy Holly.

Words of Love may also refer to:

- "Words of Love" (The Mamas & the Papas song), 1966
- Words of Love (Tete Montoliu album), 1978
- Words of Love (Buddy Holly & The Crickets album), 1993
- "Dragostea Din Tei", English title "Words of Love", a single by O-Zone

== See also ==
- "Las Palabras de Amor (The Words of Love)", a rock ballad by Queen
