= Songs for Love =

Studio album by Tete Montoliu
- Released: 1974
- Recorded: September 25, 1971
- Studio: Bavaria Sound Studio, Munich, Germany
- Genre: Jazz
- Length: 42:56
- Label: Enja enja 2040
- Producer: Klaus Weiss

Tete Montoliu chronology
| Lush Life (1971) | Songs for Love (1974) | Recordando a Line (1971) |

Songs for Love is a solo album by pianist Tete Montoliu. It was recorded in 1971 and released on the German label Enja in 1974.

== Reception ==
Professional ratings
Review scores
| Source | Rating |
|---|---|
| AllMusic | 3/5 stars |

Ken Dryden of AllMusic said "the pianist is in great form throughout the date."

== Track listing ==
All compositions by Tete Montoliu except where noted

1. "Rainy Day" (Jimmy Van Heusen, Johnny Burke) – 5:17
2. "Django" (John Lewis) – 5:41
3. "Two Catalan Songs" (Joan Manuel Serrat) – 5:34
4. "Gentofte" – 3:52
5. "Apartment 512" – 7:40
6. "Autumn In New York" (Vernon Duke) – 5:54
7. "Ballad For Line" – 5:33
8. "Little Camilla" – 3:47

== Personnel ==
- Tete Montoliu – piano
