= Catalonian Nights Vol. 2 =

Live album by Tete Montoliu
- Released: 1989
- Recorded: May 30, 1980
- Venue: Zeleste Club, Barcelona, Spain
- Genre: Jazz
- Length: 66:52
- Label: SteepleChase; SCS 1241
- Producer: Nils Winther

Tete Montoliu chronology
I Wanna Talk About You (1980)	Catalonian Nights Vol. 2 (1989)	Catalonian Nights Vol. 1 (1980)

Catalonian Nights Vol. 2 is a live album by pianist Tete Montoliu recorded in Spain in 1980 and released on the Danish label, SteepleChase in 1989.

Professional ratings
Review scores
Source	Rating
AllMusic	3/5 stars
The Penguin Guide to Jazz Recordings	3/4 stars

== Track listing ==
1. "I'll Remember April" (Gene de Paul, Pat Johnston, Don Raye) – 7:43
2. "El Neu Carrer" (Joan Manuel Serrat) – 6:30
3. "A Child Is Born" (Thad Jones) – 2:26
4. "Tune-Up" (Miles Davis) – 5:53
5. "Willow Weep for Me" (Ann Ronell) – 12:42 Bonus track on CD
6. "Steeplechase" (Charlie Parker) – 7:40
7. "My Old Flame" (Arthur Johnston, Sam Coslow) – 14:41
8. "Doxy" (Sonny Rollins) – 9:17

== Personnel ==
- Tete Montoliu – piano
- John Heard – bass
- Albert Heath – drums
