= Blues for Myself =

Blues for Myself may refer to:

- Blues for Myself (Cedar Walton album)
- Blues for Myself (Tete Montoliu album)
