= Catalonian Fire =

Studio album by Tete Montoliu Trio
- Released: 1974
- Recorded: May 26, 1974
- Studios: Rosenberg Studie in Copenhagen, Denmark
- Genre: Jazz
- Length: 57:21
- Labels: SteepleChase; SCS 1017
- Producer: Nils Winther

Tete Montoliu chronology
Temi Brasiliani (1974)	Catalonian Fire (1974)	Music for Perla (1974)

Catalonian Fire is an album by pianist Tete Montoliu's trio recorded in 1974 and released on the Danish label, SteepleChase.

== Reception ==
Professional ratings
Review scores
Source	Rating
AllMusic	4/5 stars
The Penguin Guide to Jazz Recordings	3/4 stars

Ken Dryden of AllMusic states, "Montoliu chose his rhythm section well, because both of these musicians respond well to an aggressive pianist like their leader, providing both strong support and lively interplay. ...Recommended".

== Track listing ==
1. "Sweet Georgia Fame" (Blossom Dearie, Sandra Harris) – 7:37
2. "A Nightingale Sang in Berkeley Square" (Eric Maschwitz, Manning Sherwin) – 7:35
3. "Blues for Perla" (Tete Montoliu) – 8:54
4. "Falling in Love With Love" (Lorenz Hart, Richard Rodgers) – 10:22
5. "Old Folks" (Dedette Lee Hill, Willard Robison) – 8:08
6. "Au Privave" (Charlie Parker) – 4:52
7. "Body and Soul" (Frank Eyton, Johnny Green, Edward Heyman, Robert Sour) – 9:52 Bonus track on CD reissue

== Personnel ==
- Tete Montoliu – piano
- Niels-Henning Ørsted Pedersen – bass
- Albert Heath – drums
