= Lunch in L.A. =

Studio album by Tete Montoliu
- Released: 1980
- Recorded: October 2, 1979
- Studios: Contemporary Records Studio in Los Angeles, CA
- Genre: Jazz
- Length: 54:11
- Labels: Contemporary; SJP 107
- Producer: John Koenig

Tete Montoliu chronology
Live at the Keystone Corner (1979)	Lunch in L.A. (1980)	Boston Concert (1980)

Lunch in L.A. is a solo album by pianist Tete Montoliu (with one duet with Chick Corea) recorded in 1979 and released on the Contemporary label.

== Reception ==
Professional ratings
Review scores
Source	Rating
AllMusic	4.5/5 stars
The Rolling Stone Jazz Record Guide	4/5 stars

Scott Yanow of AllMusic stated: "For what was probably his only session for an American label, the great pianist Tete Montoliu is heard in top form... Excellent playing".

== Track listing ==
All compositions by Tete Montoliu, except as indicated

1. "Airegin" (Sonny Rollins) – 3:48
2. "Blues Before Lunch" – 7:03
3. "I Want to Talk About You" (Billy Eckstine) – 12:22
4. "Put Your Little Foot Right Out" (Larry Spier) – 9:30
5. "Blues After Lunch" – 5:41
6. "Sophisticated Lady" (Duke Ellington, Irving Mills, Mitchell Parish) – 7:07
7. "Margareta" (Perry Robinson) – 8:40

== Personnel ==
- Tete Montoliu – piano
- Chick Corea – piano (track 4)
