= Face to Face (Tete Montoliu and Niels-Henning Ørsted Pedersen album) =

Studio album by Tete Montoliu and Niels-Henning Ørsted Pedersen
- Released: 1984
- Recorded: April 15, 1982
- Studio: Umeå, Sweden
- Genre: Jazz
- Length: 40:32
- Label: SteepleChase; SCS 1185
- Producer: Nils Winther

Tete Montoliu chronology
Catalonian Nights Vol. 3 (1980)	Face to Face (1984)	Carmina (1984)

Face to Face is an album by pianist Tete Montoliu and bassist Niels-Henning Ørsted Pedersen recorded in 1982 and released on the Danish label, SteepleChase.

Professional ratings
Review scores
Source	Rating
AllMusic	3/5 stars
The Penguin Guide to Jazz Recordings	3/4 stars

== Track listing ==
1. "There Will Never Be Another You" (Harry Warren, Mack Gordon) – 10:34
2. "I Love You" (Cole Porter) – 9:20
3. "I Fall in Love Too Easily" (Jule Styne, Sammy Cahn) – 11:02
4. "Lover Man/Salt Peanuts" (Jimmy Davis, Roger "Ram" Ramirez, James Sherman/Dizzy Gillespie) – 9:34

== Personnel ==
- Tete Montoliu – piano
- Niels-Henning Ørsted Pedersen – bass
