= Body & Soul (Tete Montoliu album) =

Live album by Tete Montoliu
- Released: 1983
- Recorded: April 1971
- Venues: The Domicile, Munich, Germany
- Genre: Jazz
- Length: 40:31
- Labels: Enja enja 4042
- Producer: Ernst Knauff

Tete Montoliu chronology
Tete Montoliu Interpreta a Serrat (1969)	Body & Soul (1983)	That's All (1971)

Body & Soul is a live album by pianist Tete Montoliu recorded in 1971 and released on the German label, Enja in 1983.

== Reception ==
Professional ratings
Review scores
Source	Rating
AllMusic	4.5/5 stars

Ken Dryden of AllMusic said "This 1971 live date comes from a Munich nightclub, with a respectfully audience that saves its raucous applause until the conclusion of each number. ... highly recommended".

== Track listing ==
1. "Sweet Georgia Fame" (Blossom Dearie) – 8:09
2. "Old Folks" (Dedette Lee Hill, Willard Robison) – 5:56
3. "Blues" (Tete Montoliu) – 6:11
4. "A Nightingale Sang in Berkeley Square" (Eric Maschwitz, Manning Sherwin) – 7:25
5. "Body and Soul" (Johnny Green) – 8:04
6. "Lament" (J. J. Johnson) – 4:46

== Personnel ==
- Tete Montoliu – piano
- George Mraz – bass
- Joe Nay – drums
