= Live at the Keystone Corner =

Live album by Tete Montoliu
- Released: 1981
- Recorded: September 28–29. 1979
- Venue: Keystone Korner, San Francisco, CA
- Genre: Jazz
- Length: 43:08
- Label: Timeless; SJP 138
- Producer: Wim Wigt

Tete Montoliu chronology
| Al Palau (1978) | Live at the Keystone Corner (1981) | Lunch in L.A. (1979) |

Live at the Keystone Corner is a live album by pianist Tete Montoliu recorded at Keystone Korner in 1979 and released on the Dutch label, Timeless.

Professional ratings
Review scores
| Source | Rating |
|---|---|
| AllMusic | 3/5 stars |

== Track listing ==
1. "Autumn in New York/Scrapple from the Apple" (Vernon Duke/Charlie Parker) – 10:23
2. "I'll Remember April" (Gene de Paul, Patricia Johnston, Don Raye) – 12:44
3. "You've Changed" (Carl T. Fischer, Bill Carey) – 11:12
4. "Lady Bird" (Tadd Dameron) – 8:49

== Personnel ==
- Tete Montoliu – piano
- Herbie Lewis – bass
- Billy Higgins – drums
