= Boleros (Tete Montoliu album) =

Live album by Tete Montoliu
- Released: 1977
- Recorded: May 1977
- Venues: Casino de L'Aliança del Poblenou, Barcelona, Spain
- Genre: Jazz
- Length: 45:32
- Labels: Ensayo; ENY-305

Tete Montoliu chronology
Secret Love (1977)	Boleros (1977)	Catalonian Folksongs (1977)

Boleros is an album by pianist Tete Montoliu recorded in 1977 and originally released on the Spanish label, Ensayo.

== Reception ==
Professional ratings
Review scores
Source	Rating
AllMusic	3.5/5 stars

Ken Dryden of AllMusic said "Tete Montoliu, a native of the Catalonian region of Spain, was best-known for his interpretations of standards from the Great American Songbook; he was equally familiar with popular works by jazz greats. This release has a different focus, emphasizing the works of Spanish composers. ... Recommended".

== Track listing ==
1. "Somos" (Mario Clavel) – 4:22
2. "Adoro" (Armando Manzanero) – 5:19
3. "Miénteme" (Alberto Domínguez) – 5:13
4. "Sabrá Dios" (Álvaro Carrillo) – 4:12
5. "Siboney" (Ernesto Lecuona) – 3:45
6. "Somos Novios" (Armando Manzanero) – 5:12
7. "Por Elamor de Una Mujer" (Sonny Marti, Danny Daniel) – 4:50
8. "Piel Canela" (Bobby Capó) – 3:11
9. "Sabor a M" (Carrillo) – 4:56
10. "Poinciana" (Nat Simon, Buddy Bernier) – 4:32

== Personnel ==
- Tete Montoliu – piano
- Manuel Elias – bass
- Peer Wyboris – drums
- Rogelio Juárez – percussion
