= I Wanna Talk About You =

Studio album by Tete Montoliu
- Released: 1980
- Recorded: March 22, 1980
- Studio: Sweet Silence Studios, NYC
- Genre: Jazz
- Length: 42:33
- Label: SteepleChase; SCS 1137
- Producer: Nils Winther

Tete Montoliu chronology
Boston Concert (1980)	I Wanna Talk About You (1980)	Catalonian Nights Vol. 2 (1976)

I Wanna Talk About You is an album by pianist Tete Montoliu recorded in 1980 and released on the Danish SteepleChase label.

== Reception ==
Professional ratings
Review scores
Source	Rating
AllMusic	4/5 stars
The Penguin Guide to Jazz Recordings	3/4 stars

Ken Dryden of AllMusic said: "Tete Montoliu's releases are inevitably a joy to hear; this 1980 studio session with bassist George Mraz and drummer Al Foster is no exception. ... Tenor saxophonist Hank Mobley, who by 1980 had pretty much retired from performing due to ill health, makes one of his final record dates by guesting on "Autumn Leaves"; he starts slow but ends up turning in a fine performance. Highly recommended."

== Track listing ==
All compositions by Tete Montoliu except where noted

1. "Nexus, Plexus, Sexus"- 7:09
2. "Blues for Wim and Maxine" – 7:29
3. "Scandia Skies" (Kenny Dorham) – 6:44
4. "Jo Vull Que M' Acariciis (Caress Me)" – 9:40
5. "I Wanna Talk About You" (Billy Eckstine) – 11:37
6. "Confirmation" (Charlie Parker) – 7:36 Bonus track on CD
7. "Autumn Leaves" (Joseph Kosma) – 8:08 Bonus track on CD

== Personnel ==
- Tete Montoliu – piano
- George Mraz – bass
- Al Foster – drums
- Hank Mobley – tenor saxophone (track 7)
