= Catalonian Nights Vol. 1 =

Live album by Tete Montoliu
- Released: 1981
- Recorded: May 30, 1980
- Venue: Zeleste Club, Barcelona, Spain
- Genre: Jazz
- Length: 55:18
- Label: SteepleChase; SCS 1148
- Producer: Nils Winther

Tete Montoliu chronology
Catalonian Nights Vol. 2 (1980)	Catalonian Nights Vol. 1 (1981)	Catalonian Nights Vol. 3 (1980)

Catalonian Nights Vol. 1 is a live album by pianist Tete Montoliu recorded in Spain in 1980 and released on the Danish label, SteepleChase.

== Reception ==
Professional ratings
Review scores
Source	Rating
AllMusic	4/5 stars
The Penguin Guide to Jazz Recordings	3/4 stars

Scott Yanow of AllMusic said "Although not an innovator, Montoliu (like Oscar Peterson, whose phenomenal technique he approached) was a master of the modern mainstream and of chordal improvisation. He digs into these songs and comes up with consistently fresh and swinging ideas".

== Track listing ==
1. "D & E" (Milt Jackson) – 14:03
2. "Lady Bird" (Tadd Dameron) – 7:25
3. "Jo Vull Que M'Acariciis" (Tete Montoliu) – 11:46 Bonus track on CD
4. "Autumn in New York" (Vernon Duke) – 13:22
5. "Blue Bossa" (Kenny Dorham) – 8:14
6. "Theme" (Montoliu) – 0:29

== Personnel ==
- Tete Montoliu – piano
- John Heard – bass
- Albert Heath – drums
