= That's All (Tete Montoliu album) =

Studio album by Tete Montoliu
- Released: 1985
- Recorded: September 25, 1971
- Studio: Bavaria Sound Studio, Munich, Germany
- Genre: Jazz
- Length: 37:02
- Label: SteepleChase; SCS 1199
- Producer: Klaus Weiss

Tete Montoliu chronology
Body & Soul (1971)	That's All (1985)	Lush Life (1971)

That's All is a solo album by pianist Tete Montoliu recorded in 1971 and released on the Danish label, SteepleChase Records, in 1985.

== Reception ==
Professional ratings
Review scores
Source	Rating
AllMusic	4.5/5 stars
The Penguin Guide to Jazz	3/4 stars

Scott Yanow of AllMusic wrote, "Montoliu's style has Bud Powell's bop approach as its foundation but also incorporates the more modern chord voicings of McCoy Tyner and Bill Evans. This album is a fine example of his talents".

== Track listing ==
1. "You Go to My Head" (J. Fred Coots, Haven Gillespie) – 5:11
2. "When I Fall in Love" (Victor Young, Edward Heyman) – 2:34
3. "'Round About Midnight" (Thelonious Monk) – 5:35
4. "A Child Is Born" (Thad Jones) – 5:13
5. "Giant Steps" (John Coltrane) – 4:12
6. "Imagination" (Jimmy Van Heusen, Johnny Burke) – 5:22
7. "That's All" (Alan Brandt, Bob Haymes) – 4:49
8. "Solar" (Miles Davis) – 4:07

== Personnel ==
- Tete Montoliu – piano
