= The Music I Like to Play Vol. 4 =

Studio album by Tete Montoliu
- Released: 1992
- Recorded: January 28, 1990
- Studio: Barigozzi Studio, Milan
- Genre: Jazz
- Length: 49:00
- Label: Soul Note; SN 12 1250
- Producer: Giovanni Bonandrini

Tete Montoliu chronology
The Music I Like to Play Vol. 3 (1989)	The Music I Like to Play Vol. 4 (1992)	The Man from Barcelona (1990)

The Music I Like to Play Vol. 4, subtitled Soul Eyes, is a solo album by pianist Tete Montoliu recorded in 1990 and released on the Italian Soul Note label.

== Reception ==
Professional ratings
Review scores
Source	Rating
AllMusic	4/5 stars
The Penguin Guide to Jazz	3/4 stars

In his review for AllMusic, Ken Dryden wrote, "Mixing standards, swing, bop, and hard bop compositions, Montoliu consistently comes up with imaginative treatments. ... Although Montoliu would record several additional CDs after this session, this is easily one of his most essential releases".

== Track listing ==
1. "Bluesology" (Milt Jackson) – 4:16
2. "Sophisticated Lady" (Duke Ellington, Irving Mills, Mitchell Parish) – 7:12
3. "The Way You Look Tonight" (Jerome Kern, Dorothy Fields) – 5:13
4. "Soul Eyes" (Mal Waldron) – 8:15
5. "All the Things You Are" (Kern, Oscar Hammerstein II) – 4:13
6. "Nancy (with the Laughing Face)" (Jimmy Van Heusen, Phil Silvers) – 5:28
7. "Fair Weather" (Benny Golson) – 4:18
8. "If I Should Lose You" (Ralph Rainger, Leo Robin) – 5:22
9. "Up Jumped Spring" (Freddie Hubbard) – 4:43

== Personnel ==
- Tete Montoliu – piano
