= Carmina (album) =

Studio album by Tete Montoliu
- Released: 1984
- Recorded: April 25, 1984
- Studios: Hollywood, CA
- Genre: Jazz
- Length: 43:58
- Labels: JazzIzz; JIR 4003
- Producer: Nils Winther

Tete Montoliu chronology
| Catalonian Nights Vol. 3 (1980) | Carmina (1984) | The Music I Like to Play Vol. 1 (1986) |

Carmina is an album by pianist Tete Montoliu recorded in 1984 and released on the JazzIzz label.

Professional ratings
Review scores
| Source | Rating |
|---|---|
| AllMusic | 3/5 stars |

== Track listing ==
1. "Please! No More Smoking!" (Tete Montoliu) – 3:19
2. "You Are Too Beautiful" (Richard Rodgers, Lorenz Hart) – 9:04
3. "Scandia Sky" (Kenny Dorham) – 6:15
4. "Salt Peanuts" (Dizzy Gillespie) – 2:19
5. "Carmina" (Tete Montoliu) – 7:23
6. "My Foolish Heart" (Victor Young, Ned Washington) – 9:00
7. "Stablemates" (Benny Golson) – 6:38

== Personnel ==
- Tete Montoliu – piano
- John Heard – bass
- Sherman Ferguson – drums
