= The Man from Barcelona =

Studio album by Tete Montoliu Trio
- Released: 1991
- Recorded: October 30, 1990
- Studio: Angel Studio, Lisbon, Portugal
- Genre: Jazz
- Length: 63:27
- Label: Timeless; SJP 368

Tete Montoliu chronology
| The Music I Like to Play Vol. 4 (1990) | The Man from Barcelona (1991) | A Spanish Treasure (1991) |

The Man from Barcelona is an album by pianist Tete Montoliu recorded in 1990 and released on the Dutch label, Timeless.

== Reception ==
Professional ratings
Review scores
| Source | Rating |
|---|---|
| AllMusic | 4/5 stars |

Ken Dryden of AllMusic states: "The blind Catalonian pianist Tete Montoliu is in top form throughout this 1990 trio date ... The session draws from standards and timeless jazz compositions, all played with Montoliu's inventive touch. He throws quite a few twists into his complex setting of "Stella by Starlight," shows off his chops in an intense workout of "Autumn Leaves," and pulls out all stops with the furious rendition of "A Night in Tunisia." The pianist's lyrical side is showcased in ballads like "Easy Living" and "I Fall in Love Too Easily." Montoliu returns to a bit of flashy playing in his original blues composition "Please I Like to Be Gentle." ... Highly recommended!"

== Track listing ==
1. "Concierto de Aranjuez" (Joaquín Rodrigo) – 4:01
2. "Stella by Starlight" (Victor Young, Ned Washington) – 7:16
3. "Easy Living" (Ralph Rainger, Leo Robin) – 6:33
4. "Autumn Leaves" (Joseph Kosma, Jacques Prévert, Johnny Mercer) – 5:57
5. "For You My Love" (Traditional) – 5:07
6. "Tune Up" (Miles Davis) – 4:59
7. "I Fall in Love Too Easily" (Jule Styne, Sammy Cahn) – 7:25
8. "Django" (John Lewis) – 5:45
9. "When Lights Are Low" (Benny Carter, Spencer Williams) – 5:50
10. "Please I Like to Be Gentle" (Tete Montoliu) – 4:09
11. "A Night in Tunisia" (Dizzy Gillespie, Frank Paparelli) – 5:54

== Personnel ==
- Tete Montoliu – piano
- George Mraz – bass
- Lewis Nash – drums
