= Yellow Dolphin Street =

Studio album by Tete Montoliu
- Released: 1977
- Recorded: February 28, 1977
- Studios: Dureco Studio in Weesp, Holland
- Genre: Jazz
- Labels: Timeless; SJP 107
- Producer: Wim Wigt

Tete Montoliu chronology
Meditation (1977)	Yellow Dolphin Street (1977)	Secret Love (1978)

Yellow Dolphin Street is a solo album by pianist Tete Montoliu recorded in early 1977 and released on the Dutch label, Timeless.

== Reception ==
Professional ratings
Review scores
Source	Rating
AllMusic	4/5 stars

Ken Dryden of AllMusic states, "Although this may be one of Tete Montoliu's more obscure recordings, it is also one of his finest".

== Track listing ==
All compositions by Tete Montoliu except as indicated

1. "Yellow Dolphin Street" - 5:58
2. "Come Sunday" (Duke Ellington) - 6:48
3. "I Hate You" - 4:40
4. "You've Changed" (Bill Carey, Carl Fischer) - 6:52
5. "Walse for Nicolien" - 3:52
6. "Where Are You" (Harold Adamson, Jimmy McHugh) - 5:46
7. "Napoleon" - 3:54
8. "If You Could See Me Now" (Tadd Dameron) - 5:19

== Personnel ==
- Tete Montoliu – piano
