= The Music I Like to Play Vol. 2 =

Studio album by Tete Montoliu
- Released: 1989
- Recorded: December 1, 1986
- Studio: Barigozzi Studio, Milan
- Genre: Jazz
- Length: 41:35
- Label: Soul Note; SN 1200
- Producer: Giovanni Bonandrini

Tete Montoliu chronology
The Music I Like to Play Vol. 1 (1986)	The Music I Like to Play Vol. 2 (1989)	It's Standard Time Volume 1 (1989)

The Music I Like to Play Vol. 2 is a solo album by pianist Tete Montoliu recorded in 1986 and released on the Italian Soul Note label.

Professional ratings
Review scores
Source	Rating
AllMusic	4/5 stars
The Penguin Guide to Jazz	3/4 stars

== Track listing ==
1. "Oleo" (Sonny Rollins) – 3:21
2. "Don't Blame Me" (Jimmy McHugh, Dorothy Fields) – 6:29
3. "All of You" (Cole Porter) – 5:13
4. "Cherokee" (Ray Noble) – 4:29
5. "Parker's Mood" (Charlie Parker) – 5:02
6. "Softly, as in a Morning Sunrise" (Sigmund Romberg, Oscar Hammerstein II) – 4:35
7. "You Go to My Head" (J. Fred Coots, Haven Gillespie) – 5:17
8. "Blues for Nuria" (Tete Montoliu) – 5:05
9. "A Child Is Born" (Thad Jones) – 2:04

== Personnel ==
- Tete Montoliu – piano
