= Tête-à-Tête =

Tête-à-tête (French for "face to face", literally "head to head") may refer to:

== Music ==
- Tête à Tête (opera company), a British opera company based in Cornwall
- Tête-à-Tête (Art Pepper and George Cables album), 1983
- Tête à Tete (Tete Montoliu album), 1976
- Tête à Tête, an album by ABBC, a collaboration between Amor Belhom Duo and Calexico, 2001
- Tête à tête, an album by Murray Head, 2007
- Tête-à-Tête (Ruth Anderson and Annea Lockwood album), 2023

== Other uses ==
- Tête-à-tête (book), a 2006 book about Jean-Paul Sartre and Simone de Beauvoir, by Hazel Rowley
- Tête-à-tête (furniture), a type of loveseat
- Narcissus 'Tête-à-tête', a daffodil cultivar
- The Tête à Tête, the second canvas in the Marriage A-la-Mode set of satirical paintings by William Hogarth painted in 1743

== See also ==
- Tête à Tête à Tête, a sculpture by Marcia Donahue, in Brooklyn Park (Portland, Oregon), US
- Face to Face (disambiguation)
