= Words of Love (Tete Montoliu album) =

Studio album by Tete Montoliu
- Released: 1978
- Recorded: March 20, 1976
- Studio: Dureco Studio, Weesp, Netherlands
- Genre: Jazz
- Length: 47:39 CD with additional tracks
- Label: SteepleChase; SCS 1084
- Producer: Nils Winther

Tete Montoliu chronology
Tootie's Tempo (1976)	Words of Love (1978)	Blues for Myself (1977)

Words of Love is a solo album by pianist Tete Montoliu recorded in 1976 and released on the Danish label, SteepleChase in 1978 and as a CD with additional tracks in 1994.

Professional ratings
Review scores
Source	Rating
The Penguin Guide to Jazz	3/4 stars

== Track listing ==
All compositions by Tete Montoliu except where noted

1. "Complication" – 3:43
2. "Words of Love" (Joan Manuel Serrat) – 5:44
3. "Iru Damachu" – 4:55
4. "Pietsie" – 3:24
5. "You Know" – 6:07
6. "I Didn't Know That" – 3:36
7. "Ballad for Carmen" – 2:23
8. "Point and Counterpoint" – 4:45
9. "Afscheid" (Robert Long) – 2:07 Additional track on CD release
10. "Willow Weep for Me" (Ann Ronell) – 4:43 Additional track on CD release
11. "You Don't Know What Love Is" (Gene de Paul, Don Raye) – 3:49 Additional track on CD release
12. "Airegin" (Sonny Rollins) – 2:23 Additional track on CD release

== Personnel ==
- Tete Montoliu – piano
