= F2F =

F2F may refer to:

- Friend-to-friend, a type of private P2P computer network
- Firewall-to-firewall transfers, an important part of most modern P2P network designs
- FAI CLASS F2F - Diesel Powered Profile Fuselage Control Line Team Racing Model Aircraft.
- F2F (TV series), a UK youth chat show
- "F2F" (song) by SZA, from her 2022 album SOS
- Fears to Fathom, episodic psychological horror video game series
- Grumman F2F, a biplane fighter aircraft
- Face to Face (disambiguation)
- Forecast-to-Fulfil, a term used in supply chain management, particularly in relation to cash flow or financial management
- Frequency/double frequency or Aiken Biphase. See Differential Manchester encoding.
