= Piano for Nuria =

Studio album by Tete Montoliu
- Released: 1968
- Recorded: 1968
- Studio: MPS Studio, Villingen, Germany
- Genre: Jazz
- Length: 36:28
- Label: SABA; SB 15 163 ST
- Producer: Hans Georg Brunner-Schwer

Tete Montoliu chronology
Tete Montoliu Presenta Elia Fleta (1966)	Piano for Nuria (1968)	Tete Montoliu Interpreta a Serrat (1969)

Piano for Nuria is an album by pianist Tete Montoliu recorded in 1968 and released on the German label, SABA.

== Reception ==
Professional ratings
Review scores
Source	Rating
AllMusic	4/5 stars

Ken Dryden of AllMusic stated: "The opening track is a startling original blues by Montoliu that mixes the flavor of Monk's dissonance with the Catalonian's own furious hard bop technique. Trunk contributed both the bluesy waltz 'Tranquillogy' and the unpredictable 'Visca l'Ampurda,' which must have been a challenge to learn. Montoliu's approach to standards like 'Alone Together' and 'Speak Low' is more typical, while he tackles 'I Surrender, Dear' as a solo. Unlike most recordings issued by Brunner-Schwer, the piano on this CD seems out of tune and slightly overmodulated, giving it a somewhat brittle sound. But Montoliu's breathtaking performances are able to overcome these minor blemishes".

== Track listing ==
1. "Blues For Nuria" (Tete Montoliu) – 6:01
2. "Tranquillogy" (Peter Trunk) – 5:02
3. "Alone Together" (Arthur Schwartz, Howard Dietz) – 5:40
4. "Speak Low" (Kurt Weill) – 4:17
5. "Visca L'Ampurda" (Trunk) – 5:43
6. "I Surrender Dear" (Harry Barris, Gordon Clifford) – 5:15
7. "Stable Mates" (Benny Golson) – 4:20

== Personnel ==
- Tete Montoliu – piano
- Peter Trunk – bass (tracks 1–5 & 7)
- Albert Heath – drums (tracks 1–5 & 7)
