= Lush Life (Tete Montoliu album) =

Studio album by Tete Montoliu
- Released: 1986
- Recorded: September 25, 1971
- Studios: Bavaria Sound Studio, Munich, Germany
- Genre: Jazz
- Length: 45:16
- Labels: SteepleChase; SCS 1216
- Producer: Nils Winther

Tete Montoliu chronology
That's All (1971)	Lush Life (1986)	Songs for Love (1971)

Lush Life is a solo album by pianist Tete Montoliu recorded in 1971 and released on the Danish label SteepleChase in 1986.

== Reception ==
Professional ratings
Review scores
Source	Rating
AllMusic	4/5 stars
The Penguin Guide to Jazz	3/4 stars

Scott Yanow of AllMusic wrote: "This set finds the great pianist Tete Montoliu performing his fresh and virtuosic interpretations of six standards, plus two versions of Perry Robinson's "Margareta" and his own original 'Dia Inolvidabli'. A typically excellent and swinging set".

== Track listing ==
1. "Airegin" (Sonny Rollins) - 2:44
2. "You Don't Know What Love Is" (Gene de Paul, Don Raye) - 6:04
3. "Yesterdays" (Jerome Kern, Otto Harbach) - 5:34
4. "Lush Life" (Billy Strayhorn) - 5:58
5. "Margareta" [take 1] (Perry Robinson) - 4:22
6. "Dia Inolvidabli" (Tete Montoliu) - 4:47
7. "Margareta" [take 2] (Robinson) - 5:36
8. "Willow Weep for Me" (Ann Ronell) - 4:54
9. "Imagination" (Jimmy Van Heusen, Johnny Burke) - 5:17

== Personnel ==
- Tete Montoliu – piano
