= Tête =

Tête, head in French, may refer to:

- Tête (sculpture), a 1912 work of art by Amedeo Modigliani; one of the most expensive sculptures ever sold
- "Je danse dans ma tête", a 1991 song from the Dion chante Plamondon album by Céline Dion
- Tête-bêche, a joined pair of stamps in philately
- Tête Jaune (died 1828), Iroquois-Métis trapper/furtrader/explorer
- Tête Jaune Cache, British Columbia, a town in Canada
- Tête à Tête (Murray Head album), a 2007 studio album by Murray Head
- Tête de Moine, a Swiss cheese
- Grosse Tête, Louisiana, a village in the United States of America
- La mauvaise tête, a 1957 Spirou et Fantasio album
- Tête-à-la-Baleine Airport, in Tête-à-La-Baleine, Quebec
- a title in the list of Picasso artworks 1911-1920
- Tête Blanche, a mountain in the Alps

== See also ==
- Roman Catholic Diocese of Tete
- Tete Montoliu (1933–1997)
- Tété
- Teté (1907–1962)
- Tete Province
- Chingale de Tete
- Desportivo Tete
- Physokentia tete
- Sumrai Tete (born 1979)
