= Meditation (George Coleman and Tete Montoliu album) =

Studio album by George Coleman - Tete Montoliu Duo
- Released: 1977
- Recorded: February 22, 1977
- Studios: Dureco Studio in Weesp, Holland
- Genre: Jazz
- Labels: Timeless; SJP 110
- Producer: Wim Wigt

George Coleman chronology
Meditation (1977)	Amsterdam After Dark (1978)

Tete Montoliu chronology
Blues for Myself (1977)	Meditation (1977)	Yellow Dolphin Street (1977)

Meditation (also released as Dynamic Duo) is an album of duets by the American saxophonist George Coleman and Spanish pianist Tete Montoliu recorded in early 1977 and released on the Dutch label, Timeless.

== Reception ==
Professional ratings
Review scores
Source	Rating
AllMusic	4.5/5 stars
DownBeat	4.5/5 stars

Steve Loewy of AllMusic states, "A pairing of tenor saxophonist George Coleman and pianist Tete Montoliu might at first seem odd, but this is a remarkably coherent album in nearly every respect. Coleman and Montoliu are each at the top of their form (coming straight from a European tour), the saxophonist blowing strings of notes like soap bubbles from a pipe and Montoliu singing his Tatum-esque lines".

DownBeat assigned the album 4 stars. Reviewer Lee Jeske wrote, "this is a compelling album that should stand high in anyone’s collection as a strong example of a jazz duet, as a strong example of improvised music in general or as a strong example of what can be done with two men, two instruments and no embellishment".

== Track listing ==
All compositions by George Coleman except as indicated

1. "Lisa" (Tete Montoliu) – 5:28
2. "Dynamic Duo" – 4:03
3. "First Time Down" – 5:01
4. "Waltzing at Rosa's Place" – 6:38
5. "Meditation" (Antônio Carlos Jobim, Newton Mendonça) – 11:55
6. "Sophisticated Lady" (Duke Ellington, Irving Mills, Mitchell Parish) – 5:50

== Personnel ==
- George Coleman – tenor saxophone
- Tete Montoliu – piano
