= Music for Perla =

Studio album by Tete Montoliu
- Released: 1974
- Recorded: May 26, 1974
- Studios: Rosenberg Studie in Copenhagen, Denmark
- Genre: Jazz
- Length: 46:03
- Labels: SteepleChase; SCS 1021
- Producer: Nils Winther

Tete Montoliu chronology
Catalonian Fire (1974)	Music for Perla (1974)	Tete! (1974)

Music for Perla is a solo album by pianist Tete Montoliu recorded in 1974 and released on the Danish label SteepleChase.

== Reception ==
Professional ratings
Review scores
Source	Rating
AllMusic	4/5 stars
The Penguin Guide to Jazz	3/4 stars

Ken Dryden of AllMusic states, "Beautifully recorded in a bright-sounding studio with a first-rate piano, this CD is a great example of Tete Montoliu's abilities early in his recording career."

== Track listing ==
All compositions by Tete Montoliu except as indicated

1. "Yesterdays" (Otto Harbach, Jerome Kern) – 6:07
2. "Here's That Rainy Day" (Johnny Burke, Jimmy Van Heusen) – 5:11
3. "Margareta" (Perry Robinson) – 4:57
4. "Imagination" (Burke, Van Heusen) – 5:11
5. "Have You Met Miss Jones?" (Lorenz Hart, Richard Rodgers) – 4:05
6. "I Feel All Alone" – 2:50
7. "What Is It?" – 1:15
8. "Circe" – 2:33
9. "Gentofte 4349" – 2:31
10. "Apartment 512" – 11:23

== Personnel ==
- Tete Montoliu – piano
