= The Music I Like to Play Vol. 1 =

Studio album by Tete Montoliu
- Released: 1987
- Recorded: December 1, 1986
- Studio: Barigozzi Studio, Milan
- Genre: Jazz
- Length: 44:31
- Label: Soul Note; SN 1180
- Producer: Giovanni Bonandrini

Tete Montoliu chronology
Carmina (1984)	The Music I Like to Play Vol. 1 (1987)	The Music I Like to Play Vol. 2 (1986)

The Music I Like to Play Vol. 1 is a solo album by pianist Tete Montoliu recorded in 1986 and released on the Italian Soul Note label.

== Reception ==
Professional ratings
Review scores
Source	Rating
AllMusic	4/5 stars
The Penguin Guide to Jazz	3/4 stars

Scott Yanow of AllMusic states, "One of the underrated greats (due to his residing in his native Spain throughout his career), Montoliu recorded fairly frequently throughout his career in Europe and was quite consistent. This album gives one a fine example of his talented playing".

== Track listing ==
1. "Don't Smoke Anymore" (Tete Montoliu) – 5:10
2. "It Never Entered My Mind" (Richard Rodgers, Lorenz Hart) – 5:48
3. "Alone Together" (Howard Dietz, Arthur Schwartz) – 4:37
4. "Old Folks" (Willard Robison, Dedette Lee Hill) – 6:28
5. "Little B's Poem" (Bobby Hutcherson) – 6:01
6. "I'll Remember April" (Gene de Paul, Patricia Johnston, Don Raye) – 4:32
7. "A Time for Love" (Johnny Mandel, Paul Francis Webster) – 6:56
8. "Whisper Not" (Benny Golson) – 4:59

== Personnel ==
- Tete Montoliu – piano
