= Tete Montoliu Presenta Elia Fleta =

Studio album by Tete Montoliu and Elia Fleta
- Released: 1966
- Recorded: January 1966
- Studio: Barcelona, Spain
- Genre: Jazz
- Length: 23:36
- Label: Concentric; 6038 ZC & 6043-ZC

Tete Montoliu chronology
A Tot Jazz/2 (1965)	Tete Montoliu Presenta Elia Fleta (1966)	Piano for Nuria (1968)

Elia Fleta Tete Montoliu Trio Cover

Tete Montoliu Presenta Elia Fleta is an album by pianist Tete Montoliu and vocalist Elia Fleta recorded in 1966 and originally released on the Spanish label, Concentric as two separate 7-inch EPs before being collected on CD on the Fresh Sound label in 1989.

== Reception ==
Professional ratings
Review scores
Source	Rating
AllMusic	3.5/5 stars
The Penguin Guide to Jazz Recordings	3.5/4 stars

Ken Dryden of AllMusic said "Blind Catalonian pianist Tete Montoliu evidently introduced singer Elia Fleta on this 1966 session, but it could have been a more interesting date if the pianist had been showcased a bit more. Fleta has a pleasant voice, even if her vocals sung in English are a bit heavily accented and she has a tendency to overdo things at times. Montoliu is flawless in his role as accompanist, though with each performance running under three minutes, there is little exposure for any of them".

== Track listing ==
1. "Lush Life" (Billy Strayhorn) – 3:33
2. "This Can't Be Love" (Richard Rodgers, Lorenz Hart) – 1:40
3. "Satin Doll" (Duke Ellington) – 2:31- Previously unreleased
4. "My Romance" (Rodgers, Hart) – 2:33
5. "Honeysuckle Rose" (Fats Waller, Andy Razaf) – 2:29
6. "I Fall in Love Too Easily (M'enamoro Tan Facilment)" (Jule Styne, Sammy Cahn) – 2:44
7. "Love For Sale (Amor Per Vendre)" (Cole Porter) – 2:48
8. "Cor Inquiet (My Foolish Heart)" (Victor Young, Ned Washington) – 2:38
9. "Les Fulles Mortes (Les Feuilles Mortes)" (Joseph Kosma, Jacques Prévert) – 2:40

== Personnel ==
- Tete Montoliu – piano
- Elia Fleta – vocals
- Erik Peter – bass
- Peer Wyboris – drums
- Josep Maria Espinàs- adaptation (tracks 8 & 9)
