= The Music I Like to Play Vol. 3 =

Studio album by Tete Montoliu
- Released: 1991
- Recorded: January 28, 1990
- Studio: Barigozzi Studio, Milan
- Genre: Jazz
- Length: 47:14
- Label: Soul Note; SN 1180
- Producer: Giovanni Bonandrini

Tete Montoliu chronology
Sweet'n Lovely Volume 1 (1989)	The Music I Like to Play Vol. 3 (1991)	The Music I Like to Play Vol. 4 (1990)

The Music I Like to Play Vol. 3, subtitled Let's Call This, is a solo album by pianist Tete Montoliu performing compositions associated with Thelonious Monk recorded in 1990 and released on the Italian Soul Note label.

== Reception ==
Professional ratings
Review scores
Source	Rating
AllMusic	4/5 stars
The Penguin Guide to Jazz	3/4 stars

Ken Dryden of AllMusic states, "Montoliu's approach to the keyboard is hardly a slavish adaptation of Monk's style, though there are some obvious influences, and as liner note writer Art Lange points out, he owes a debt to Bud Powell as well. He opens the CD with an uncredited chorus or so of the elegantly played "Jackie-Ing" before launching into overdrive for "Straight, No Chaser"; likewise, his daredevil approach to the furiously played "Well, You Needn't" is a treat. His disguised introduction to "Let's Call This" plays with the listener's ears, and he plays a modified form of stride in "Blues Five Spot." He also stretches the boundaries of the two standards "Sweet and Lovely" and "April in Paris" in a playful way worthy of Monk. It's a pity that Montoliu only recorded one more studio session as a leader following this productive date, but all of the late blind pianist's releases from his final years are well worth acquiring".

== Track listing ==
All compositions by Thelonious Monk except where noted.

1. "Straight, No Chaser" – 4:56
2. "Reflections" – 7:02
3. "In Walked Bud" – 3:31
4. "Misterioso" – 4:32
5. "Well, You Needn't" – 3:31
6. "April in Paris" (Vernon Duke, Yip Harburg) – 4:38
7. "Let's Call This" – 3:58
8. "Sweet and Lovely" (Gus Arnheim, Jules LeMare, Harry Tobias) – 5:01
9. "Blues Five Spot" – 3:27
10. "Monk's Mood" – 3:54
11. "Rhythm-a-Ning" – 2:44

== Personnel ==
- Tete Montoliu – piano
