= Tootie's Tempo =

Studio album by Tete Montoliu Trio
- Released: 1979
- Recorded: February 15–16, 1976
- Studios: Weesp, The Netherlands
- Genre: Jazz
- Length: 51:28
- Labels: SteepleChase; SCS 1108
- Producer: Nils Winther

Tete Montoliu chronology
Tête à Tete (1976)	Tootie's Tempo (1979)	Words of Love (1976)

Tootie's Tempo is an album by pianist Tete Montoliu's Trio recorded in 1976 and released on the Danish label, SteepleChase.

== Reception ==
Professional ratings
Review scores
Source	Rating
AllMusic	3/5 stars
The Penguin Guide to Jazz Recordings	3.5/4 stars

Ken Dryden of AllMusic said, "This CD is highly recommended, as are all of Tete Montoliu's recordings for Steeplechase."

== Track listing ==
1. "Invitation" (Bronisław Kaper) – 9:49
2. "Lover Man" (Jimmy Davis, Ram Ramirez, Jimmy Sherman) – 5:42
3. "Some Other Blues" (John Coltrane) – 5:45
4. "Time for Love" (Slide Hampton) – 9:31
5. "Lament" (J. J. Johnson) – 8:00
6. "Tootie's Tempo" (Tete Montoliu) – 5:30
7. "Darn That Dream" (Eddie DeLange, Jimmy Van Heusen) – 7:11

== Personnel ==
- Tete Montoliu – piano
- Niels-Henning Ørsted Pedersen – bass
- Albert Heath – drums
