= A Tot Jazz/2 =

Studio album by Tete Montoliu
- Released: 1966
- Recorded: Summer 1965
- Studios: Barcelona, Spain
- Genre: Jazz
- Length: 39:17
- Labels: Concentric; 5703-SZL

Tete Montoliu chronology
A Tot Jazz (1965)	A Tot Jazz/2 (1966)	Tete Montoliu Presenta Elia Fleta (1966)

A Tot Jazz/2 is an album by pianist Tete Montoliu recorded in 1965 and originally released on the Spanish label, Concentric.

== Reception ==
Professional ratings
Review scores
Source	Rating
AllMusic	4/5 stars

Ken Dryden of AllMusic stated: "This is another excellent date by the blind Catalonian pianist."

== Track listing ==
1. "Chim Chim Cher-ee" (Richard M. Sherman, Robert B. Sherman) – 5:50
2. "Polka Dots and Moonbeams" (Jimmy Van Heusen, Johnny Burke) – 4:12
3. "Secret Love" (Sammy Fain, Paul Francis Webster ) – 7:12
4. "Salt Peanuts" (Dizzy Gillespie, Kenny Clarke) – 3:17
5. "Israel" (John Carisi) – 4:38
6. "Sometime Ago" (Sergio Mihanovich) – 5:42
7. "Come Rain or Come Shine" (Harold Arlen, Johnny Mercer) – 5:19
8. "Have You Met Miss Jones?" (Richard Rodgers, Lorenz Hart) – 3:07

== Personnel ==
- Tete Montoliu – piano
- Erik Peter – bass
- Billy Brooks – drums
