= Catalonian Folksongs =

Studio album by Tete Montoliu
- Released: 1978
- Recorded: December 9, 1977
- Studios: Fendal Sound Studio, Loenen aan de Vecht, Holland
- Genre: Jazz
- Length: 40:58
- Labels: Timeless; SJP 116
- Producer: Wim Wigt

Tete Montoliu chronology
Boleros (1977)	Catalonian Folksongs (1978)	Al Palau (1978)

Catalonian Folksongs is a solo album by pianist Tete Montoliu recorded in 1977 and released on the Dutch label, Timeless.

== Reception ==
Professional ratings
Review scores
Source	Rating
AllMusic	3/5 stars

Scott Yanow of AllMusic states, "For this set of piano solos, Tete Montoliu (a native of Spain who, if he had played regularly in the U.S., would have been much more famous in the jazz world) plays lyrical versions of ten obscure songs, most of which were composed by the Spanish singer-guitarist Joan Manuel Serrat. The melodies are sometimes haunting, sometimes just sentimental, but Montoliu consistently brings out their beauty during his concise interpretations".

== Track listing ==
All compositions by Joan Manuel Serrat except where noted.

1. "Cigales al Ven" (Tete Montoliu) – 5:01
2. "Cançó de Matinada" – 4:38
3. "Manuel" – 5:19
4. "Me Embaix Apeu" – 4:15
5. "Una Guitarra" – 3:54
6. "Ruco" (Lluís Millet) – 5:40
7. "Quin Plan Teniu Señor" – 3:28
8. "Sota un Cireré Flurit" – 4:15
9. "La Amelia Esta Malalba" (Josep Maria Llongueres) – 3:25
10. "Els Segadors" (Francesc Alió) – 1:03

== Personnel ==
- Tete Montoliu – piano
