= Aamne Samne =

Aamne Samne (lit. 'Face to Face') may refer to these Indian Hindi-language films:

- Aamne Samne (1967 film)
- Aamne Samne (1982 film), by Ashim Samanta

== See also ==
- Face to Face (disambiguation)
