= Secret Love (Tete Montoliu album) =

Live album by Tete Montoliu Trio
- Released: 1978
- Recorded: March 31 and April 1, 1977
- Venue: De Bommel, Breda, Holland
- Genre: Jazz
- Length: 49:18
- Label: Timeless; SJP 111
- Producer: Wim Wigt

Tete Montoliu chronology
| Yellow Dolphin Street (1977) | Secret Love (1978) | Boleros (1977) |

Secret Love is a live album by pianist Tete Montoliu recorded in Breda in 1977 and released on the Dutch label, Timeless.

== Track listing ==
1. "Secret Love" (Sammy Fain, Johnny Mercer) – 10:45
2. "Airegin" (Sonny Rollins) – 5:31
3. "Confirmation" (Charlie Parker) – 7:30
4. "Four" (Miles Davis) – 8:51
5. "Stella by Starlight" (Victor Young, Ned Washington) – 16:41

== Personnel ==
- Tete Montoliu – piano
- Sam Jones – bass
- Billy Higgins – drums
