= A Tot Jazz =

A Tot Jazz/2

Studio album by Tete Montoliu
- Released: 1966
- Recorded: Summer 1965
- Studios: Barcelona, Spain
- Genre: Jazz
- Length: 39:17
- Labels: Concentric; 5701-SZL

Tete Montoliu chronology
A Tot Jazz/2 (1966)	A Tot Jazz/2 (1965)

A Tot Jazz is the debut album by pianist Tete Montoliu recorded in 1965 and originally released on the Spanish label, Concentric.

== Reception ==
Professional ratings
Review scores
Source	Rating
AllMusic	4/5 stars
The Penguin Guide to Jazz Recordings	3.5/4 stars

Ken Dryden of AllMusic stated: "Tete Montoliu's abilities as a pianist are overlooked by many jazz fans because few of his recordings were readily available outside of Europe during his lifetime, though they are generally all worth hearing. ... Recommended".

== Track listing ==
1. "Stella By Starlight" (Victor Young, Ned Washington) – 9:12
2. "I Guess I'll Hang My Tears Out to Dry" (Jule Styne, Sammy Cahn) – 6:07
3. "Scandia Sky" (Kenny Dorham) – 4:30
4. "Fly Me to the Moon" (Bart Howard) – 8:09
5. "Lament" (J. J. Johnson) – 5:14
6. "Au Privave" (Charlie Parker) – 6:32

== Personnel ==
- Tete Montoliu – piano
- Erik Peter – bass
- Billy Brooks – drums
