= Boston Concert =

Live album by Tete Montoliu
- Released: 1981
- Recorded: March 17, 1980
- Venue: Morse Auditorium, Boston University, Boston, MA
- Genre: Jazz
- Length: 78:31
- Label: SteepleChase; SCS 1152/53
- Producer: Nils Winther

Tete Montoliu chronology
Lunch in L.A. (1979)	Boston Concert (1981)	I Wanna Talk About You (1980)

Boston Concert is a live solo album by pianist Tete Montoliu recorded in Boston in 1980 and originally released on the Danish label, SteepleChase as a double LP in 1981 then released in 1989 as two single CD volumes.

Professional ratings
Review scores
Source	Rating
AllMusic	3/5 stars
The Penguin Guide to Jazz	3/4 stars

== Track listing ==
Disc one

1. Introduction – 1:34 Bonus track on CD released
2. "New England Blues" – 7:17
3. "I Guess I'll Hang My Tears Out to Dry" (Jule Styne, Sammy Cahn) – 9:10
4. "Have You Met Miss Jones?" (Richard Rodgers, Lorenz Hart) – 5:15
5. "Catalan Suite" (Traditional) – 16:15
6. "Hot House" (Tadd Dameron) – 5:00

Disc two

1. "Airegin" (Sonny Rollins) – 6:20
2. "Lush Life" (Billy Strayhorn) – 8:00
3. "Giant Steps" (John Coltrane) – 4:15
4. "When I Fall in Love" (Victor Young, Edward Heyman) – 1:55
5. "A Child Is Born" (Thad Jones) – 2:30
6. "Confirmation" (Charlie Parker) – 5:10
7. "Apartment 512" (Tete Montoliu) – 11:50
8. "Oleo/Come Sunday/Oleo" (Rollis/Duke Ellington/Rollins) – 3:00

== Personnel ==
- Tete Montoliu – piano
