= Andy Scherrer =

Swiss musician (1946–2019)

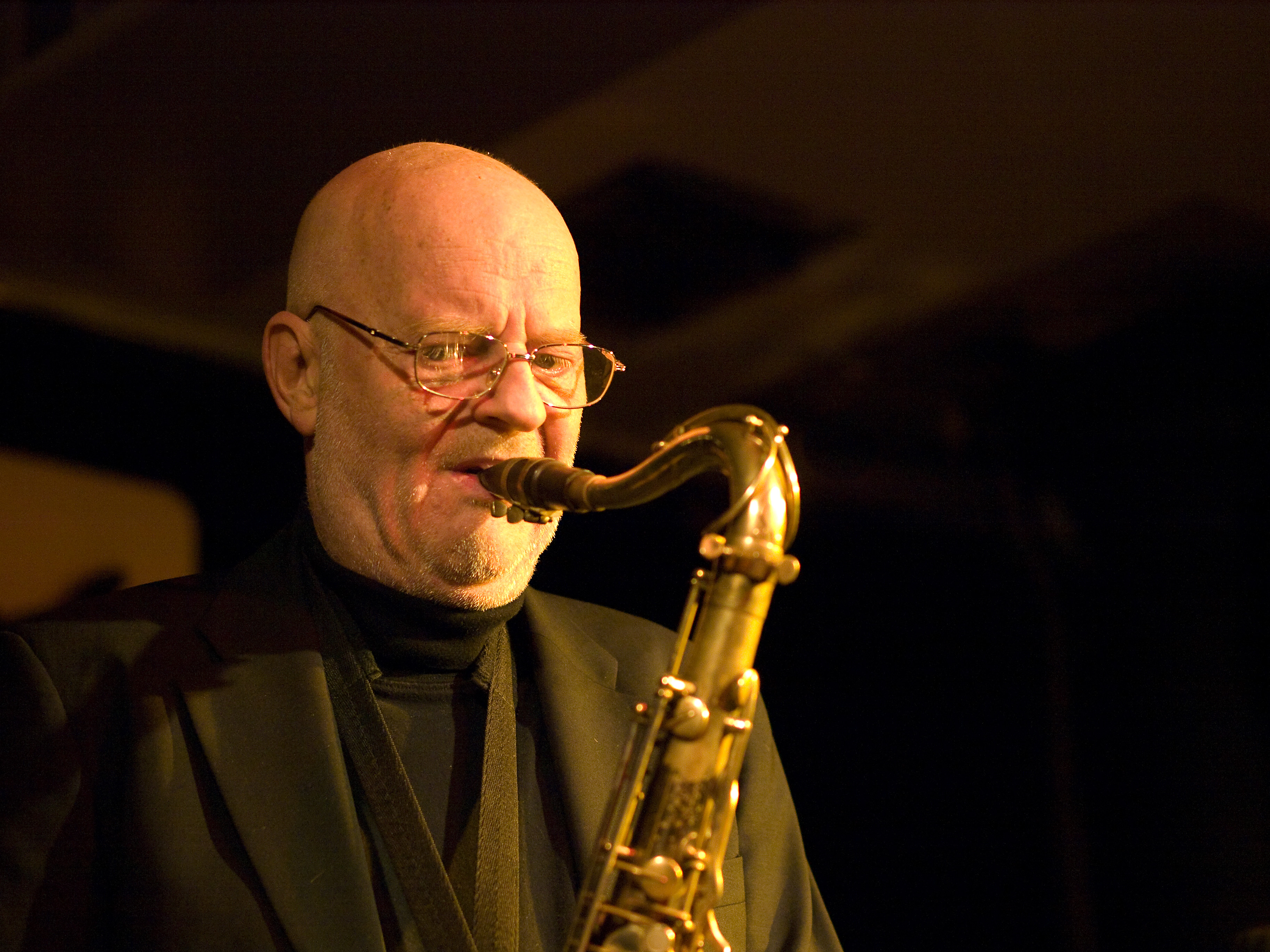

Background information
- Born: 10 October 1946; Brunnadern, Switzerland
- Died: 26 November 2019 (aged 73)
- Genres: Jazz
- Occupation: Musician
- Instrument(s): Piano, saxophone

Andy Scherrer (10 October 1946 – 26 November 2019) was a Swiss musician who played piano and saxophone.

== Biography ==
Scherrer was born in 1946 in Brunnadern. At the age of 15, Scherrer taught himself how to play saxophone. He was educated at the City of Basel Music Academy, and taught at the Swiss Jazz School in Bern from 1975 to 2011. He was a member of the Vienna Art Orchestra and The George Gruntz Concert Jazz Band. In addition to the saxophone, he also played piano.

Radio Télévision Suisse referred to Scherrer as a "monument to Swiss jazz."

Scherrer died on 26 November 2019.
