= Mari Trini =

Spanish pop singer and actress

- Born: María Trinidad Pérez de Miravete Mille; 12 July 1947; Caravaca de la Cruz, Murcia, Spain
- Died: 6 April 2009 (aged 61) Murcia, Murcia, Spain
- Occupation: Singer-songwriter

María Trinidad Pérez de Miravete Mille (12 July 1947 – 6 April 2009), better known as Mari Trini, was a Spanish singer-songwriter.

Born in Caravaca de la Cruz, she learned to play guitar as a youngster and wrote songs from an early age. Trini met producer Nicholas Ray in the 1960s, and he encouraged her to move to London; soon after she left for Paris, where she eventually signed to a record label. Her debut album was released in 1969, and through the 1970s and 1980s was a popular figure in Spanish pop music.

Mari Trini died in Murcia in 2009, from liver cancer.

== Discography ==
- 1969: Mari Trini
- 1970: Amores
- 1971: Escúchame
- 1973: Ventanas
- 1973: L'automne
- 1974: ¿Quién?
- 1975: Canta en francés
- 1975: Transparencias
- 1976: Como el rocío
- 1977: El tiempo y yo
- 1978: Solo para ti
- 1978: Ayúdala
- 1979: A mi aire
- 1981: Oraciones de amor
- 1982: Una estrella en mi jardín
- 1984: Mari Trini
- 1984: Diario de una mujer
- 1985: En vivo
- 1986: Quién me venderá
- 1987: En tu piel
- 1990: Espejismos
- 1993: Sus grandes éxitos
- 1995: Sin barreras
- 1996: Alas de cristal
- 2001: Mari Trini con los Panchos

== See also ==
- List of best-selling Latin music artists
