= Tete! =

Studio album by Tete Montoliu Trio
- Released: 1975
- Recorded: May 28, 1974
- Studios: Rosenberg Studie in Copenhagen, Denmark
- Genre: Jazz
- Length: 46:03
- Labels: SteepleChase; SCS 1029
- Producer: Nils Winther

Tete Montoliu chronology
Music for Perla (1974)	Tete! (1975)	Vampyria (1974)

Tete! is an album by pianist Tete Montoliu's Trio recorded in 1974 and released on the Danish label, SteepleChase.

== Reception ==
Professional ratings
Review scores
Source	Rating
AllMusic	4.5/5 stars
The Penguin Guide to Jazz Recordings	3.5/4 stars

Scott Yanow of AllMusic called it "a typically excellent date.".

== Track listing ==
1. "Giant Steps" (John Coltrane) - 6:31
2. "Theme for Ernie" (Fred Lacey) - 7:14
3. "Body and Soul" (Frank Eyton, Johnny Green, Edward Heyman, Robert Sour) - 12:22
4. "Solar" (Miles Davis) - 7:00
5. "I Remember Clifford" (Benny Golson) - 8:26
6. "Hot House" (Tadd Dameron) - 7:00

== Personnel ==
- Tete Montoliu – piano
- Niels-Henning Ørsted Pedersen - bass
- Albert Heath - drums
