= Blues for Myself (Tete Montoliu album) =

Studio album by Tete Montoliu
- Released: 1977
- Recorded: January 3, 1977
- Studios: Barcelona, Spain
- Genre: Jazz
- Length: 40:29
- Labels: Ensayo; ENY-304

Tete Montoliu chronology
Words of Love (1976)	Blues for Myself (1977)	Meditation (1977)

Blues for Myself is an album by pianist Tete Montoliu recorded in 1977 and originally released on the Spanish label, Ensayo.

== Reception ==
Professional ratings
Review scores
Source	Rating
AllMusic	4/5 stars

Ken Dryden of AllMusic said "The blind Catalonian pianist Tete Montoliu is in great form on this 1977 session recorded in Spain ... this disc is worth acquiring".

== Track listing ==
All compositions by Tete Montoliu except where noted.

1. "Blues for Corien" – 5:05
2. "You've Changed" (Bill Carey, Carl T. Fischer) – 7:30
3. "It Could Happen to You" (Jimmy Van Heusen, Johnny Burke) – 6:05
4. "Blues for Myself" – 6:10
5. "Jimmy's Tempo" (Jimmy Heath) – 5:10
6. "Blues for Llorach" – 5:55
7. "Blues for Coltrane" – 3:50

== Personnel ==
- Tete Montoliu – piano
- Erik Peter – bass
- Peer Wyboris – drums
