= Tête à Tete (Tete Montoliu album) =

Studio album by Tete Montoliu Trio
- Released: 1976
- Recorded: February 15–16, 1976
- Studios: Weesp, The Netherlands
- Genre: Jazz
- Length: 40:12
- Labels: SteepleChase; SCS 1054
- Producer: Nils Winther

Tete Montoliu chronology
Vampyria (1974)	Tête à Tete (1976)	Tootie's Tempo (1976)

Tête à Tete is an album by pianist Tete Montoliu's Trio recorded in 1976 and released on the Danish label SteepleChase.

== Reception ==
Professional ratings
Review scores
Source	Rating
AllMusic	3/5 stars
The Rolling Stone Jazz Record Guide	4/5 stars
The Penguin Guide to Jazz Recordings	3.5/4 stars
DownBeat	5/5 stars

Ken Dryden of AllMusic said "This is an essential CD for fans of the late Tete Montoliu."

== Track listing ==
1. "What's New?" (Bob Haggart, Johnny Burke) – 11:06
2. "We'll Be Together Again" (Carl T. Fischer, Frankie Laine) – 9:05
3. "Catalan Suite" (Tete Montoliu) – 20:01

== Personnel ==
- Tete Montoliu – piano
- Niels-Henning Ørsted Pedersen – bass
- Albert Heath – drums
