= Catalonian Nights Vol. 3 =

Live album by Tete Montoliu
- Released: 1989
- Recorded: May 31, 1980
- Venue: Zeleste Club, Barcelona, Spain
- Genre: Jazz
- Length: 71:54
- Label: SteepleChase; SCCD 31433
- Producer: Nils Winther

Tete Montoliu chronology
Catalonian Nights Vol. 1 (1980)	Catalonian Nights Vol. 3 (1989)	Face to Face (1982)

Catalonian Nights Vol. 3 is a live album by pianist Tete Montoliu recorded in Spain in 1980 and released on the Danish label SteepleChase in 1989.

Professional ratings
Review scores
Source	Rating
AllMusic	3/5 stars
The Penguin Guide to Jazz Recordings	3/4 stars

== Track listing ==
1. "Easy Living" (Ralph Rainger, Leo Robin) – 11:50
2. "No Greater Love" (Isham Jones, Marty Symes) – 10:04
3. "Jo Vull Que M'Acariciis" (Tete Montoliu) – 10:13
4. "Scrapple from the Apple" (Charlie Parker) – 6:19
5. "When Lights Are Low" (Benny Carter, Spencer Williams) – 8:04
6. "We'll Be Together Again" (Carl T. Fischer, Frankie Laine) – 10:20
7. "Joy Spring" (Clifford Brown) – 5:40
8. "Bags' Groove" (Milt Jackson) – 9:27

== Personnel ==
- Tete Montoliu – piano
- John Heard – bass
- Albert Heath – drums
