= Miriam Klein =

Swiss jazz singer

- Born: 27 March 1937 (age 88); Basel; Switzerland
- Genres: jazz
- Occupation: singer

Miriam Klein (27 March 1937 in Basel) is a Swiss jazz singer.

== Life and works ==
Miriam Klein gained fame for the first time, when she appeared on the scene in Paris with Pierre Michelot, Don Byas and Art Simmons in the 1950s. After education at the music school in Vienna, she went back to Switzerland and has sung in the group of her husband Oscar Klein since 1963.

In 1960s and 1970s, she gained international fame as a singer. In 1973, her famous album Lady Like was published. The album was dedicated to Billie Holiday. In the album, she performed with the musicians Roy Eldridge, Dexter Gordon and Slide Hampton. She recorded also music with Albert Nicholas (1971) and Wild Bill Davison (1976).

In 1977, Klein worked with Fritz Pauer's trio and in 1978 with Roland Hanna and George Mraz in her album By Myself. In 1981/82, she made a tour with Kenny Clarke, Hanna and Isla Eckinger. In 2001, she took part in My Marilyn, the album of her son David Klein.
