= Mediterráneo (Joan Manuel Serrat album) =

Studio album by Joan Manuel Serrat
- Released: 1971
- Genres: Nueva canción; Nova Cançó; trova; Spanish folk
- Length: 33:49
- Label: Novola

Joan Manuel Serrat chronology
Serrat IV (1970)	Mediterráneo (1971)	Vagabundear (1972)

Professional ratings
Review scores
Source	Rating
LaFonoteca	5/5 stars

Mediterráneo is the eighth studio album by Joan Manuel Serrat, released in 1971 by Novola. It is considered by both critics and audiences as one of the best albums in the history of Spanish music. In celebration of their 20th in 2004, Rockdelux published a special 198 page issue with a list of "the 100 greatest Spanish records of the 20th century" Mediterráneo placed in third. The album was inducted into the Latin Grammy Hall of Fame in 2007. The album went out of print in the decades that followed its release and was eventually reissued in 2000.

All the songs were written by Joan Manuel Serrat, except the lyrics of "Vencidos", which was based on a poem by León Felipe. The arrangements were done by Juan Carlos Calderón, Gian Piero Reverberi and Antoni Ros-Marbà and with Calderón and Reverberi also providing musical direction.

== Track listing ==
All tracks are written by Joan Manuel Serrat, except where noted.

No.	Title	Length
1.	"Mediterráneo"	3:25
2.	"Aquellas pequeñas cosas"	1:48
3.	"La mujer que yo quiero"	3:48
4.	"Pueblo blanco"	4:50
5.	"Tío Alberto"	3:20
6.	"Qué va a ser de ti"	4:36
7.	"Lucía"	3:03
8.	"Vagabundear"	2:36
9.	"Barquito de papel"	3:00
10.	"Vencidos" (León Felipe)	3:20
