= Face2face (software) =

Mobile application developed by Proximate Global Inc.

face2face
- Original author: Proximate Global Inc.
- Release: July 2010; 16 years ago
- Stable release: 1.5.2.35
- Size: 6.9 MB
- Available in: English
- Type: social networking
- Website: www.face2face.ws

Face2Face is a proximity-based mobile application developed by Proximate Global Inc. that enables users to identify when members of their social networks are within close proximity. Launched in July 2010, the app integrates data from various social networks to provide users with information about nearby connections while maintaining privacy controls.

== Privacy and security ==
Face2Face gathers data from social and business networks, such as Facebook, LinkedIn, MySpace, and Twitter, to facilitate its proximity alerts. To address privacy concerns about location-based apps, Face2Face incorporates a "reciprocal sharing" feature, ensuring that users only share their location with others if they have mutually agreed to reveal their presence. Although the app collects location data, it does not disclose exact coordinates, providing an additional layer of privacy protection.

== Reception and Awards ==
Shortly after its launch, Face2Face was downloaded 10,000 times within its first month of availability. The app received recognition from Mashable, earning the "Spark of Genius" award in July 2010.
