= Joan Manuel Serrat =

Spanish musician (born 1943)

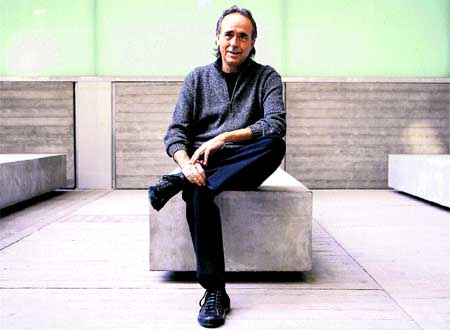
- Serrat in 2007

Background information
- Born: Joan Manuel Serrat Teresa; 27 December 1943 (age 82); Barcelona, Spain
- Genres: Nueva canción; pop; rock
- Occupations: Musician; singer; composer
- Instruments: Vocals; guitar
- Years active: 1965–2022
- Labels: Serdisco; Sony BMG; Zafiro
- Website: www.jmserrat.com (in Spanish and Catalan)

Joan Manuel Serrat Teresa (Catalan pronunciation: [ʒuˈam mənuˈɛl səˈrat]; born 27 December 1943) is a Spanish musician, singer, and composer. He is considered one of the most important figures of modern, popular music in both the Spanish and Catalan languages.

Serrat's lyrical style has been influenced by other poets such as Mario Benedetti, Antonio Machado, Miguel Hernández, Rafael Alberti, Federico García Lorca, Pablo Neruda, and León Felipe. He has also recorded songs by Violeta Parra and Víctor Jara. Serrat was one of the pioneers of what is known in Catalan as "Nova Cançó" (Nueva Canción). Juan Manuel Serrat is also known by the names "El noi del Poble-sec" and "El Nano".

== Biography ==
=== Childhood ===
Joan Manuel Serrat Teresa was born 27 December 1943 in the Poble-sec neighbourhood of Barcelona, to members of a working family. His father, Josep Serrat, was a Catalan anarchist affiliated with the CNT and his mother, Ángeles Teresa, a housewife, was from Belchite, Zaragoza in the region of Aragon. His childhood and environment in his neighbourhood greatly impacted him, as a great number of his songs described Catalonia after the Spanish Civil War (examples are "La Carmeta", "La tieta" and "El drapaire" as stereotypical characters from his neighbourhood).

=== Early career ===
Serrat became involved with music at the age of 17 when he obtained his first guitar to which he dedicated one of his earliest songs, "Una guitarra". In the early 1960s, the young artist participated in a pop band, playing along with classmates at Barcelona's Agronomy School and performing mainly Beatles songs and Italian 'pop-of-the-era' songs translated to Spanish. In 1965, while singing in a radio show called Radioscope, host Salvador Escamilla helped him secure a record deal with local label Edigsa, from there joining the group Els Setze Jutges which defended the Catalan language during the Francoist Spain. In that same year, he recorded his first EP Una guitarra with the songs Una guitarra, Ella em deixa, La mort de l'avi and El mocador. In 1966 appeared his second EP Ara que tinc vint anys with the songs Ara que tinc vint anys, Quan arriba el fred, El drapaire and Sota un cirerer florit. In 1967 his first LP was released Ara que tinc vint anys which included some songs from previous EP recordings, as well as Balada per a un trobador, Els vells amants and Els titelles. Joan Manuel Serrat's first live stage performance in 1967 at the Palau de la Música Catalana, served to establish him as one of the most important artists inside the Nova cançó movement in Catalonia.

The following year, Televisión Española (TVE) entered Serrat in the Eurovision Song Contest 1968 to sing "La, la, la", but he demanded to sing it in Catalan, to which the broadcaster did not agree. This would be the first time he would come into conflict with the language politics of Francoist Spain, because of his decision to sing in his native language. Ultimately, Serrat participation was cancelled, and was replaced by Massiel, who went on to win the contest with her performance in Spanish.

=== 1969–1976 ===
Serrat's first son Queco was born in 1969, and in that same year he made his first tour to South America. He released an album containing songs with texts of Antonio Machado, a well-known Spanish poet of late 19th-early 20th century. This album brought him immediate fame in all Spain and Latin America though, in spite of this, his decision to sing in Spanish was criticized in some Catalan nationalist circles. Regarding this and other times when his choice of language (sometimes Spanish, sometimes Catalan) raised controversy on either side of the political sphere, he once explained: "I sing better in the language they forbid me." This statement has often been interpreted in the context of the Francoist regime’s repression of Catalan, but Serrat later clarified that he was referring to Spanish. In democratic Spain, knowledge of Spanish is legally mandatory throughout the country, as established in Article 3 of the 1978 Constitution, whereas no law in Catalonia obliges citizens to know Catalan. He participated and won the song festival of Rio de Janeiro in 1970 with his single "Penélope".

The release of the Mediterráneo LP in 1971 consolidated the artist's reputation worldwide. During that year, Serrat sang a seminal concert at the theater of the University of Puerto Rico, Río Piedras Campus, which was highly influential in the Puerto Rican music community of the time, and which had repercussions as late as 2006.

In late 1974, Serrat was exiled in Mexico due to his condemnation of capital punishment in Francoist Spain. It wasn't until Franco's death on 20 November 1975 that Serrat was able to return to his homeland. In 1976, Joan Manuel Serrat was acclaimed for the first time in the United States, while performing in Los Angeles, San Francisco, and New York.

=== 1995 to present ===
In January 1995, the Spanish government awarded him a medal for his contribution to Hispanic culture. That same year, a tribute album called Serrat, eres único was made to honour his career, featuring artists such as Diego Torres, Ketama, Rosario Flores, Joaquín Sabina, and Antonio Flores. In the same year, he toured "Nadie es Perfecto", through several countries in Latin America. In February 1995, Serrat gave a concert at University of Lima, in Lima, Peru. On 28 November 1998, Serrat performed the Cant del Barça during the FC Barcelona Centenary festival at the Camp Nou.

In 2000, the Spanish Association of Authors and Editors (SGAE) awarded him with one of ten Medals of the Century.

Serrat revealed in October 2004 that he had been undergoing treatment for cancer of the urinary bladder and in November that year he had to cancel a tour of Latin America and the US in order to undergo surgery in Barcelona, where he still lives. His signature song "Mediterráneo" was selected as the most important song of the 20th century in Spain.

His recovery was satisfactory, and in 2005 he went on tour again ("Serrat 100×100") around Spain and Latin America with his lifelong producer and arranger, Ricard Miralles. During the tour Serrat played symphonic versions of his songs with local symphony orchestras.

A second volume of Serrat, eres único was also released this year, featuring Alejandro Sanz, Estopa, and Pasión Vega. Around the same time, Cuban artists such as Silvio Rodríguez, Pablo Milanés, Chucho Valdés, and Ibrahim Ferrer came together to make another tribute CD, Cuba le canta a Serrat.

By 2006, the theater of the University of Puerto Rico in Río Piedras where Serrat sang in 1970 had undergone a multimillion-dollar renovation, after being closed for ten years. The university planned to reopen the theater with Serrat as its first popular culture act, thus recalling his first performance there. However, student protests over the university conceding private entities control over some theater administration functions ended up in a physical confrontation between some student leaders and patrons attending the theater's inaugural gala, the day before Serrat's first scheduled performance. As a result, the concerts had to be postponed and changed to another venue. Serrat felt particularly uneasy about the whole situation; when he was pressed to take sides in the controversy he opted to remain neutral.

In 2006, Serrat also released Mô, his first album completely in Catalan in 17 years. The album title refers to the city of Mahón, capital of the Spanish island of Menorca, where he likes to get away from it all during long touring seasons.

In 2017 and 2018, he carried a tour named "Mediterraneo da Capo" to commemorate the 47th anniversary of his mythical record "Mediterraneo".

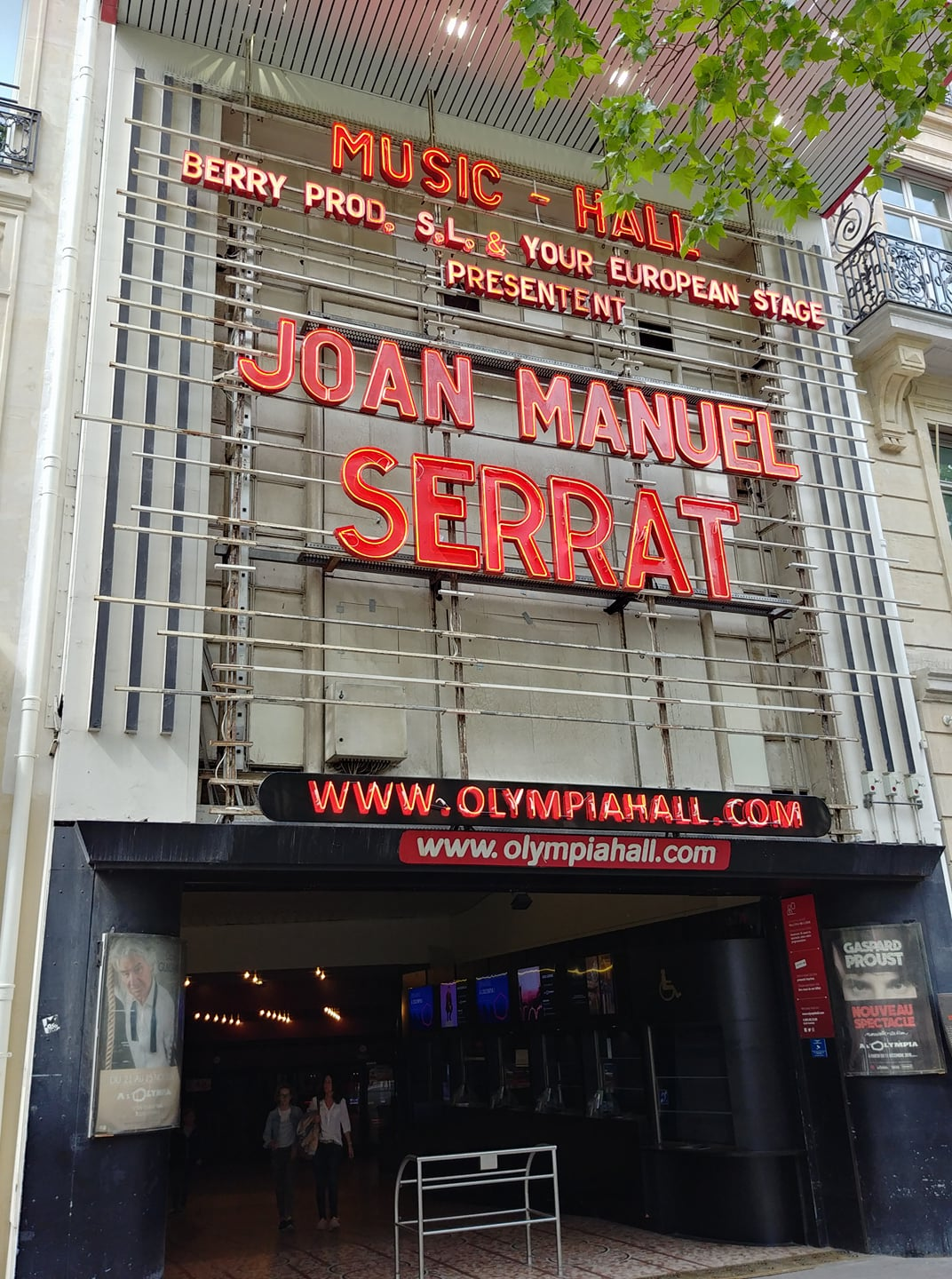
Billboard of the Olympia (Paris), on 12 May 2018 –tour "Mediterraneo da Capo"–

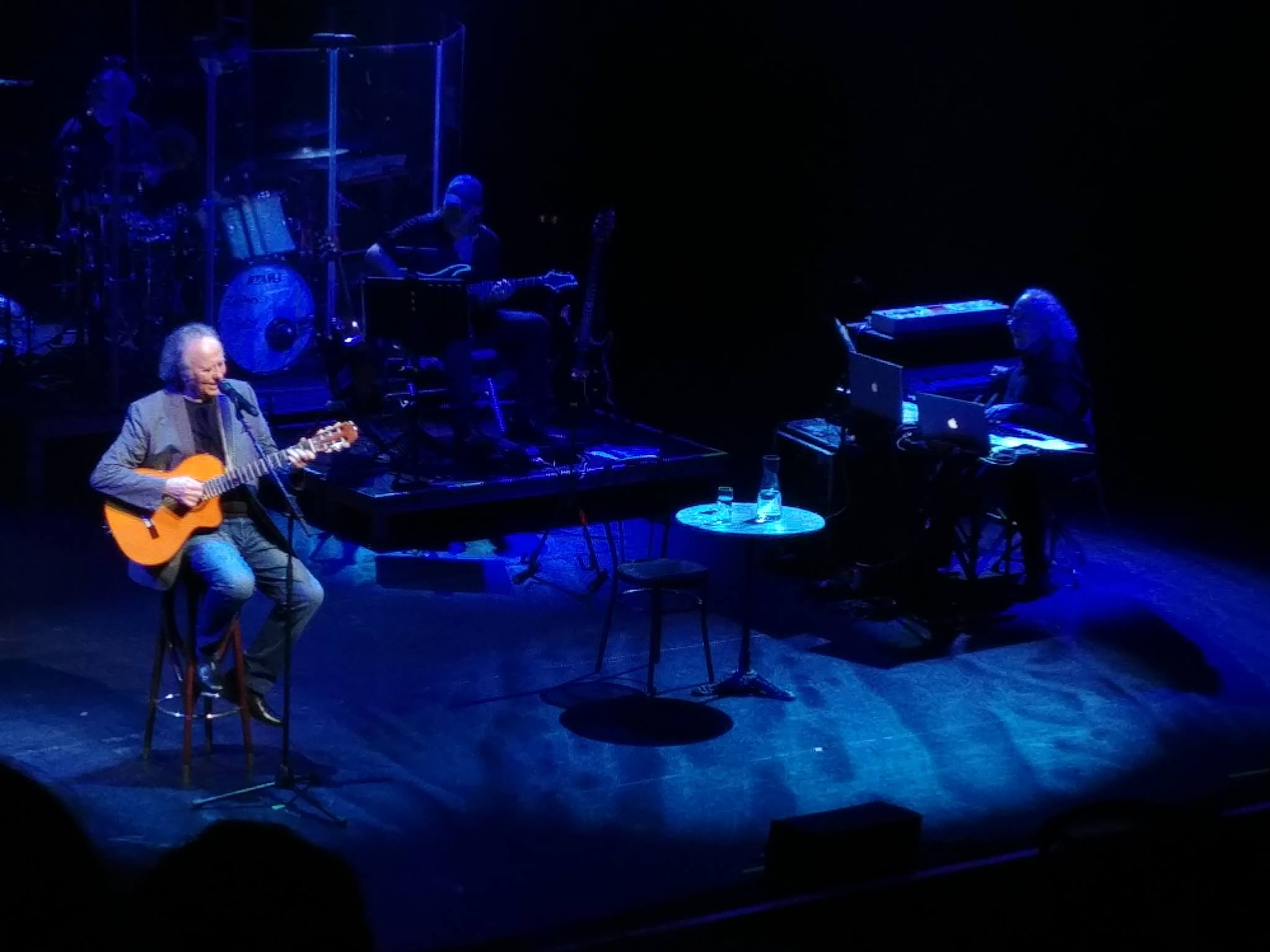
Serrat during his concert in the Olympia (Paris), on 12 May 2018

Serrat is a part owner of the Mas Perinet winery producing both DO Montsant and DOC Priorat wines in La Morera de Montsant.

== Legacy ==
There are many artists and authors of songs that have paid homage to the figure and work of Joan Manuel Serrat. Among the most noteworthy are Ahí te mando mi guitarra, Juan Manuel, composed by Manuel Alejandro and played by Blanca Villa while Serrat was in exile for his statements against the death penalty; the recent Maldito Serrat by the Argentine singer-songwriter Ignacio Copani; Mi primo el Nano, composed by his friend Joaquín Sabina, and the Canción para un maño, a song by Georges Brassens adapted by Paco Ibáñez.

Apart from these songs that deal exclusively with the figure of Joan Manuel Serrat, there are others that mention the name of Joan Manuel Serrat or some of his songs. These are the cases of Alberto Cortez in his live version of No soy de aquí, by Joaquín Sabina himself when he recorded No hago otra cosa que pensar en ti on the album Serrat, eres único, of Presuntos Implicados in "Ser de agua" or of singer-songwriters like Juan Carlos Baglietto, Fito Páez, Javier Ruibal, Víctor Heredia, Fernando Delgadillo, Ricardo Arjona, Amaury Pérez, Vicente Feliú, Alejandro Filio, Kiko Tovar, Cacho Duvanced, Ramiro Segrelles, Joan Isaac, Guillermina Motta, Gerardo Peña, Hernaldo Zúñiga, Liuba María Hevia, Alejandro Nardecchia, Miquel Pujadó, Joan Baptista Humet, among others.

You can also quote in this section the lyrics of Sóc el millor, which Francesc Pi de la Serra composed, although more than in homage was a harsh criticism towards Serrat for his decision of Joan Manuel to sing also in Spanish. Also noteworthy is the humorous version of the song Ara que tinc vint anys, which La Trinca recorded with a change in title: Ara que tinc 80 anys.

== Political views ==
In 1974, during a visit to Mexico, an arrest warrant was issued for Serrat in Spain after he criticised the death penalty and the "established and official violence" of the dictatorship of Francisco Franco. Serrat lived in exile for the remainder of the Francoist dictatorship, returning after the death of Franco in 1975 and Spain's return to democracy.

In several of his statements. Serrat has criticized the independence movement of Catalonia, as well as the 1 October 2017 Catalan independence referendum, becoming a figure for Catalans who choose the union of Spain. He has also criticized several times the economic corruption of the independentist Catalan government and the national government of Mariano Rajoy. Serrat holds the view that the unilateral 2017 Catalan declaration of independence and the reaction from the government of Rajoy served the purpose of "covering up years of cuts and economic corruption" from both the Catalan regional government and Spanish national government. On several occasions, some in the independence movement called for a boycott against Serrat.

== Serrat and Llach ==
Joan Manuel Serrat has long been compared to fellow Catalan singer-songwriter Lluís Llach, particularly in regard to their linguistic choices and political symbolism. While Llach exclusively performed in Catalan as an act of cultural and political assertion, especially during and after the Franco regime, Serrat opted to sing in both Catalan and Spanish, which earned him both praise and criticism. Some viewed his bilingualism as a bridge between communities, while others saw it as a concession to mainstream Spanish audiences. Despite their differences, both artists are regarded as iconic voices of modern Catalan music.

== Select discography ==
=== Albums ===
- 1967: Ara que tinc Vint Anys
- 1968: Cançons Tradicionals
- 1969: Com ho fa el Vent
- 1969: La Paloma
- 1969: Dedicado a Antonio Machado, poeta
- 1970: Serrat IV
- 1971: Mediterráneo
- 1972: Vagabundear
- 1972: Miguel Hernández
- 1973: Per al meu Amic
- 1974: Canción Infantil
- 1975: ...Para Piel de Manzana
- 1976: Retratos
- 1977: Res no és Mesquí
- 1978: 1978
- 1979: Mi Niñez
- 1980: Tal com Raja
- 1981: En Tránsito
- 1983: Cada Loco con su Tema
- 1984: Fa Vint Anys que tinc Vint Anys
- 1984: En Directo
- 1985: El Sur También Existe
- 1986: Sinceramente Teu
- 1987: Bienaventurados
- 1989: Material Sensible
- 1992: Utopía List of number-one albums of 1992 (Spain)
- 1994: Nadie es Perfecto
- 1996: Banda Sonora d'un Temps d'un País
- 1996: El Gusto Es Nuestro
- 1998: Sombras de la China
- 2000: Cansiones (Tarrés)
- 2002: Versos en la Boca
- 2003: Serrat Sinfónico
- 2006: Mô
- 2007: Dos Pájaros de un Tiro
- 2010: Hijo de la Luz y de la Sombra
- 2012: La orquesta del Titanic
- 2012: Serrat & Sabina En El Luna Park
- 2015: En Bellas Artes

=== Tribute albums ===
- 1969: Tete Montoliu – Tete Montoliu Interpreta a Serrat (Discmedi)
- 1977: Tete Montoliu – Catalonian Folksongs (Timeless)
- 1995: Varios – Serrat, eres único (BMG Ariola)
- 2002: Ricardo León – Antes que lleguen los perros (Whitehill)
- 2004: Ricardo León – Levementeodioso (Whitehill)
- 2005: Varios – Serrat, eres único (volumen 2) (BMG Ariola)
- 2005: Varios – Cuba le canta a Serrat (Discmedi)
- 2006: Varios – Per al meu amic Serrat (Discmedi)
- 2007: Varios – Cuba le canta a Serrat (volumen 2) (Discmedi)

== Some awards and recognitions received ==
- Fotogramas de Plata for the best musical activity (1970 and 1972)
- Premios Ondas special award of the Organization for his professional career in the history of Spanish popular music in 1995.
- Doctor honoris causa by National University of Comahue (Neuquén, Argentina) in 1999.
- Honorary Doctorate from the Autonomous University of the State of Morelos of Cuernavaca (Morelos, Mexico), 16 May 2003.
- Doctor honoris causa by National University of Córdoba (Argentina), 25 November 2005.
- Doctor honoris causa for the Meritorious Autonomous University of Puebla (Mexico), 12 January 2006.
- Doctor honoris causa by the Complutense University of Madrid, on 15 March 2006.
- Doctor honoris causa by Miguel Hernández University of Elche, on 21 May 2010.
- Doctor honoris causa by Pompeu Fabra University of Barcelona, on 14 June 2011.
- Honorary Doctorate from the National Autonomous University of Mexico, on 22 September 2011.
- Honorary Doctorate from the Autonomous University of Mexico State, on 13 October 2015
- Premios Micrófono de Oro award of Castile and León (Spain), in 2003.
- Gold Medal of the city of Barcelona, on 24 March 2006.
- His Mediterráneo song was chosen as the best song of the 20th century Spanish language by the Rolling Stone magazine, in 2006.
- Spanish Gold Medal of Merit in Labour for his entire career, on 25 March 2006.
- Medal of Honor of Parliament of Catalonia, in 2007.
- Premio Nacional de Músicas Actuales award, in 2010.
- Order of the Aztec Eagle in insignia degree, by the federal government of Mexico in 2010.
- City of Barcelona Award for music, for his work "Hijo de la luz y de la sombra" (2010).
- Premio Luna del Auditorio Nacional award as the best Ibero-American show next to Joaquín Sabina. (2013).
- Latin Grammy, honorary award as 2014 Person of the Year. (2014).
- Premios Ondas award, For his artistic career. (2014).
- Premio Cortes de Cádiz award, 2015.
- High Distinction of the Generalitat Valenciana
- Grand Cross of the Order of James I the Conqueror, 2017.
- Doctor Honoris Causa by the National University of Rosario (UNR) (Argentina), on 7 October 2017
- Grand Cross of the Civil Order of Alfonso X, the Wise, on 8 December 2021.
- Princess of Asturias Award for the Arts.

== See also ==
- List of best-selling Latin music artists
