= Swiss Jazz School =

Coordinates: 46.940918°N 7.431619°E

- Type: Public college
- Established: 1967
- Location: Bern, Canton of Bern, Switzerland
- Website: https://www.sjs.ch/?lang=en

Swiss Jazz School in Bern is the first autonomous jazz school in Europe, which offers continuously jazz lessons. The school was founded in 1967.

The Swiss Jazz School has currently two departments:

- General School: The general school of the Swiss Jazz School offers a semi-professional training in the field of jazz and styles related to jazz.
- College department: The college department of the school offers bachelor's degree in a three years lasting education, which is followed by a two years lasting master's degree in the subjects teaching jazz, performance or arrangement-composition.

== History ==
In 1967, the Swiss Jazz School was founded on the initiative of two musicians from Bern, Heinz Bigler and Tony Hostettler. The next teachers of the school were Joe Haider, Isla Eckinger and Peter Giger. In 1972, the Swiss Jazz School became an independent teaching school, which was supported by the city and the canton of Bern. In this year, the school was divided in two departments.
