= Tete Montoliu =

Spanish jazz pianist (1933–1997)

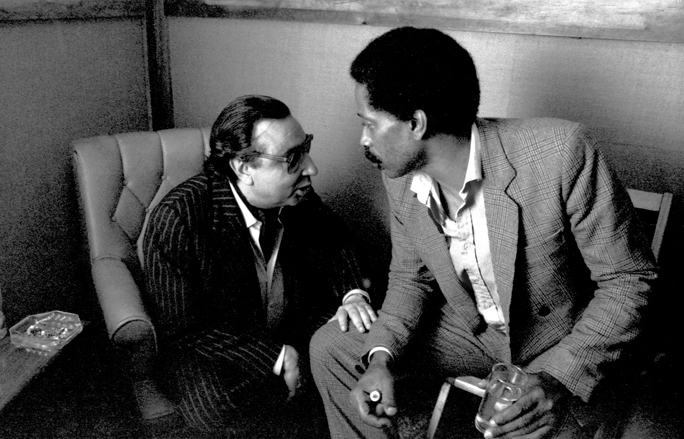
- Montoliu (left), with Bobby Hutcherson at Kuumbwa Jazz Center, Santa Cruz, California, 14 May 1984

Background information
- Born: Vicente Montolíu Massana; 28 March 1933; Catalonia, Spain
- Died: 24 August 1997 (aged 64)
- Genres: Jazz
- Occupation: Musician
- Instrument: Piano

Vicenç Montoliu i Massana, better known as Tete Montoliu (28 March 1933 – 24 August 1997) was a Spanish jazz pianist from Catalonia, Spain. Born blind, he learnt braille music at age seven. His styles varied from hard bop, through Afro-Cuban, world fusion, to post bop. He recorded with Lionel Hampton in 1956 and played with saxophonist Roland Kirk in 1963. He also worked with leading American jazz musicians who toured in, or relocated to Europe including Kenny Dorham, Dexter Gordon, Ben Webster, Lucky Thompson, and Anthony Braxton. Tete Montoliu recorded two albums in the US, and recorded for Enja, SteepleChase Records, and Soul Note in Europe.

== Biography ==
Montoliu was born blind, in the Eixample district of Barcelona, Spain, and died in the same city. He was the only son of Vicenç Montoliu (a professional musician) and Àngela Massana, a jazz enthusiast, who encouraged her son to study piano. Montoliu's earliest piano teaching took place under the tutelage of Enric Mas at the private school for blind children he attended from 1939 to 1944. In 1944, Montoliu's mother arranged for Petri Palou to provide him with formal piano lessons.

From 1946 to 1953, Montoliu studied music at the Conservatori Superior de Música del Liceu in Barcelona, where he also met jazz musicians and became familiar with the idiom in jam sessions. During the early stages of his career, Montoliu was particularly influenced by the music of U.S. jazz pianist Art Tatum, although he soon developed his own style. (Coincidentally, Tatum was also impaired with extremely limited vision). Montoliu began playing professionally at pubs in Barcelona, where he was noticed by Lionel Hampton on 13 March 1956. Montoliu toured with Hampton through Spain and France and recorded Jazz Flamenco.

In 1967, Montoliu performed in New York City with bassist Richard Davis and drummer Elvin Jones. Two concerts at the Village Gate in April were recorded for the Impulse! label, but an album was never released. He frequently appeared in Madrid during the 1960s at the Whiskey Jazz Club with musicians Pedro Iturralde and singer Donna Hightower. During the 1970s, Montoliu travelled extensively throughout Europe. During the 1980s, he performed in concerts with musicians such as Dexter Gordon, Johnny Griffin, George Coleman, Joe Henderson, Dizzy Gillespie, Chick Corea, Hank Jones, Roy Hargrove, Idris Muhammad, Herbie Lewis and Jesse Davis, among others.

In 1996, shortly before his death a year later, Spain paid public tribute to Montoliu for his 50-year career in jazz.

He died in August 1997 from lung cancer, at the age of 64.

== Discography ==
=== As leader/co-leader ===
- 1965: A Tot Jazz (Concentric, 1966)
- 1965: A Tot Jazz/2 (Concentric, 1966)
- 1966: Tete Montoliu Presenta Elia Fleta with Elia Fleta (Concentric, 1966)
- 1968: Piano for Nuria (SABA, 1968)
- 1969: Tete Montoliu Interpreta a Serrat (Discophon, 1969)
- 1970?: Lliure Jazz (Discophon, 1970)
- 1971: Body & Soul (Enja, 1983) – live
- 1971: That's All (SteepleChase, 1985)
- 1971: Lush Life (SteepleChase, 1986)
- 1971: Songs for Love (Enja, 1974)
- 1971: Recordando a Line (Discophon, 1972)
- 1973: Temas Hispanoamericanos (Ensayo, 1974)
- 1973: Temas Brasilenos (Ensayo, 1974)
- 1974?: Vampyria with Jordi Sabatés (BASF, 1974)
- 1974: Catalonian Fire (SteepleChase, 1974)
- 1974: Music for Perla (SteepleChase, 1974)
- 1974: Tete! (SteepleChase, 1975)
- 1976: Tête à Tete (SteepleChase, 1976)
- 1976: Tootie's Tempo (SteepleChase, 1979)
- 1976: Words of Love (SteepleChase, 1978)
- 1977: Blues for Myself (Ensayo, 1977)
- 1977: Meditation with George Coleman (Timeless, 1977)
- 1977: Yellow Dolphin Street (Timeless, 1977)
- 1977: Secret Love (Timeless, 1978) – live
- 1977: Boleros (Ensayo, 1977) – live
- 1977: Catalonian Folksongs (Timeless, 1978)
- 1979: Al Palau (Zeleste-Edigsa, 1979)
- 1979: Live at the Keystone Corner (Timeless, 1981) – live
- 1979: Lunch in L.A. (Contemporary, 1980)
- 1980: Boston Concert (SteepleChase, 1981) – live
- 1980: I Wanna Talk About You (SteepleChase, 1980)
- 1980: Catalonian Nights Vol. 1 (SteepleChase, 1981) – live
- 1980: Catalonian Nights Vol. 2 (SteepleChase, 1985) – live
- 1980: Catalonian Nights Vol. 3 (SteepleChase, 1998) – live
- 1982: Face to Face with Niels-Henning Ørsted Pedersen (SteepleChase, 1984)
- 1984: Carmina (Jazzizz, 1984)
- 1986: The Music I Like to Play Vol. 1 (Soul Note, 1987)
- 1986: The Music I Like to Play Vol. 2 (Soul Note, 1989)
- 1988: Orquestra Taller de Músics de Barcelona amb Tete Montoliu with Orquestra Taller de Músics de Barcelona (Justine, 1988)
- 1989: New Year's Morning '89 with Peter King (Fresh Sound, 1989) – live
- 1989: Sweet 'n Lovely 1 with Mundell Lowe (Fresh Sound, 1991)
- 1989: Sweet 'n Lovely 2 with Mundell Lowe (Fresh Sound, 1991)
- 1990: The Music I Like to Play Vol. 3 (Soul Note, 1991)
- 1990: The Music I Like to Play Vol. 4 (Soul Note, 1992)
- 1990: The Man from Barcelona (Timeless, 1991)
- 1991: A Spanish Treasure (Concord Jazz, 1992)
- 1992: Catalonian Rhapsody (Alfa, 1992)
- 1992: Music for Anna (Mas i Mas, 1993)
- 1995: Tete en la Trompetilla: En Vivo (SRP Discos, 1995) – live
- 1995: Tete Montoliu en El San Juan (Nuevos Medios, 1996) – live
- 1996: T'Estimo Tant (DiscMedi, 1999) – studio live
- 1997: Per Sempre Tete (DiscMedi, 1997) – live
- 1997: Palau de la Musica Catalana (DiscMedi, 1999) – live

Posthumous compilations

- Momentos Inolvidables de una Vida: Barcelona 1965-1992 (Fresh Sound, 1997)[2CD]
- Montoliu Plays Tete (DiscMedi, 2005)[2CD]
- Jazz en Espana (Rtve, 2005)[2CD]

=== As sideman ===
With Anthony Braxton

- In the Tradition (SteepleChase, 1974)
- In the Tradition Volume 2 (SteepleChase, 1977) – rec. 1974

With Dexter Gordon

- 1964: Cheese Cake (SteepleChase, 1979)
- 1964: King Neptune (SteepleChase, 1979)
- 1964: I Want More (SteepleChase, 1980)
- 1964: Love for Sale (SteepleChase, 1981)
- 1964: It's You or No One (SteepleChase, 1983)
- 1964: Billie's Bounce (SteepleChase, 1983)
- 1975: Bouncin' with Dex (SteepleChase, 1976)

With Rahsaan Roland Kirk

- Kirk in Copenhagen (Mercury, 1963)
- Dog Years in the Fourth Ring (32 Jazz, 1997) – appears on one track only

With Charlie Mariano

- It's Standard Time Volume 1 (Fresh Sound)
- It's Standard Time Volume 2 (Fresh Sound)

With Ben Webster

- Ben Webster Meets Don Byas (MPS, 1968) with Don Byas
- Live at The Haarlemse Jazz Clib (Timeless, 1972)
- Ben Webster in Hot House (Hot House, 1979) – rec. 1972
- Gentle Ben (Ensayo, 1972)

With others

- Núria Feliu, Núria Feliu with Booker Ervin (Edigsa, 1965) with Booker Ervin
- Eddie Harris, Steps Up (SteepleChase, 1981)
- Jordi Sabatés, Tot l'Enyor de Dema (Edigsa, 1976)
- Archie Shepp and Lars Gullin, The House I Live In (SteepleChase, 1980)
- Buddy Tate, Tate a Tete (Storyville, 1975)
- Lucky Thompson, Soul's Nite Out (Ensayo, 1969)
- Barney Wilen, Barney Wilen Quartet - Live
- Jerome Richardson, Groovin' High In Barcelona (Fresh Sound, 1988)

== In Popular Cultures ==
- Tete Telerin is given the name of a boy from Familia Telerín created by Jose Luis Moro.
