= Jo Thönes =

German percussionist

Jo Thönes (born 28 November 1958) is a German percussionist, Jazz drummer and composer.

== Life ==
Born in Leverkusen, Thönes began playing the drums at the age of thirteen. In 1976 and 1977, he had lessons with Christoph Caskel at the Rheinische Musikschule in Cologne, with whom he subsequently studied at the Hochschule für Musik Köln. During his studies, he was a member of Manfred Schoof's band, with whose big band he also performed at the Deutsches Jazzfestival, Prague and the JazzFest Berlin in the 1980s. He also played in Sigi Buschs' bands, for example in a trio with Tom van der Geld and was a member of the GermanFrench Jazz Ensemble of Henri Texier and Albert Mangelsdorff, with whom he also performed in a trio. Since 1981, he has been a member of various ensembles of Uli Beckerhoff, in whose recordings of "Private Life" (1992) and "Das Geheimnis" (1994) he was also involved. He also played with the quartet of Kenny Wheeler and Tom Van der Geld, with Reinhard_Glöder, Christof Lauer, Tony Lakatos, Jiří Stivín, Dom Um Romão, Jasper van 't Hof, Klaus Doldinger and Hugo Read. In 1989, Thönes began his collaboration with Markus and Simon Stockhausen, which also resulted in recordings such as Aparis (1989) and Jubilee (1996). Thönes has also been a guest soloist with the WDR Big Band, as well as in several projects by Klaus König and in the "Celebration Orchestra" of Tony Oxley, but also with Joachim Kühn as well as with jazz fusion musicians like James Blood Ulmer, Christoph Spendel, Michael Sagmeister, John Schröder, John Abercrombie and Peter O'Mara.

Thönes increasingly worked as an interpreter of Neue Musik and was involved in performances of works by Charles Ives, Bernd Alois Zimmermann, Mauricio Kagel and Steve Reich. He also composed ballet music for the New York Palindrome Dance Company.

Thönes also worked as a studio musician for film and television productions and as a lecturer at numerous jazz workshops and at the Folkwang University of the Arts before he was appointed professor at the Hochschule für Musik Franz Liszt, Weimar in 1995.
