= Barbara Thompson (musician) =

English jazz saxophonist, flautist and composer (1944–2022)

Barbara Thompson MBE
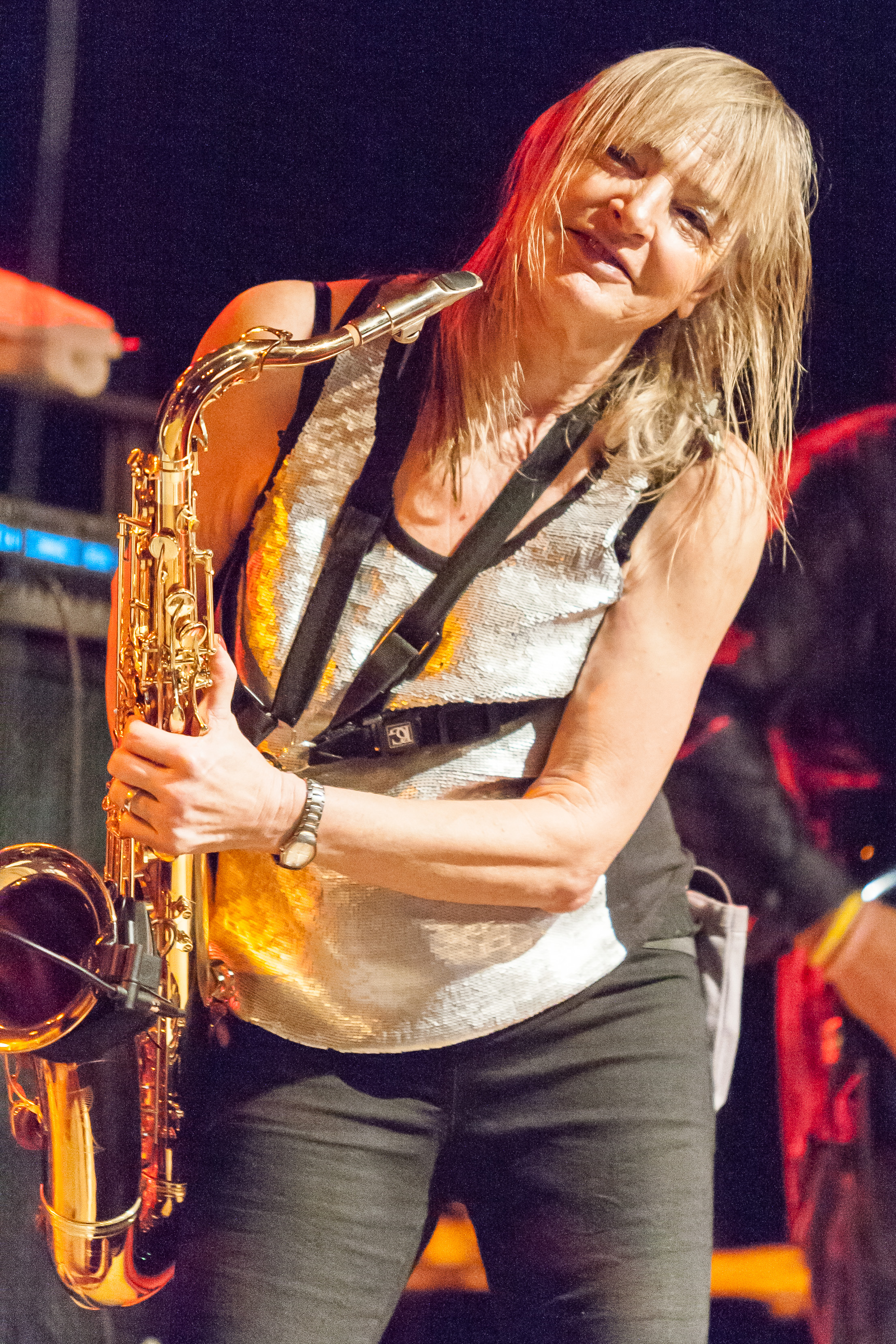
- Thompson in 2010

Background information
- Born: Barbara Gracey Thompson; 27 July 1944; Oxford, England
- Origin: Finchley, England
- Died: 9 July 2022 (aged 77) Carshalton, London, England
- Genres: Jazz; jazz rock
- Occupations: Musician, composer
- Instruments: Saxophone; flute
- Years active: 1964–2022
- Labels: MCA, Mood, Intuition
- Spouse: Jon Hiseman (m. 1967; died 2018)
- Website: www.temple-music.com

Barbara Gracey Thompson MBE (27 July 1944 – 9 July 2022) was an English jazz saxophonist, flautist and composer. She studied clarinet, flute, piano and classical composition at the Royal College of Music, but the music of Duke Ellington and John Coltrane made her shift her interests to jazz and saxophone. She was married to drummer Jon Hiseman of Colosseum from 1967 until his death in 2018.

== Career ==
Around 1970, Thompson was part of Neil Ardley's New Jazz Orchestra and appeared on albums by Colosseum. Beginning in 1975, she was involved in the foundation of three bands:

- United Jazz and Rock Ensemble, a "band of bandleaders" with Wolfgang Dauner (p), Volker Kriegel (g), Albert Mangelsdorff (tb), Eberhard Weber (b), Ian Carr (tp), Charlie Mariano (sax), Ack van Rooyen (tp) and Jon Hiseman (dr).
- Barbara Thompson's Jubiaba (9-piece Latin/rock band) including Peter Lemer, Roy Babbington, Henry Lowther, Ian Hamer, Derek Wadsworth, Trevor Tomkins, Bill Le Sage, Glyn Thomas.
- Barbara Thompson's Paraphernalia, a band with Peter Lemer (p), Billy Thompson (v), Dave Ball (b) and Jon Hiseman on drums.

She was awarded the MBE in 1996 for services to music. Due to Parkinson's disease, which was diagnosed in 1997, she retired as an active saxophonist in 2001 with a farewell tour. After a period of working as a composer exclusively, she returned to the stage in 2003 for a tour with Colosseum.

After she was hospitalised with atrial fibrillation, her attendance in an accident and emergency department was featured in an episode of the Channel 4 fly-on-the-wall television documentary 24 Hours in A&E in October 2020.

Thompson worked closely with Andrew Lloyd Webber on musicals such as Cats and Starlight Express, his Requiem, and Lloyd Webber's 1978 classical-fusion album Variations. She wrote several classical compositions, music for film and television, a musical of her own and songs for the United Jazz and Rock Ensemble, Barbara Thompson's Paraphernalia and her big band Moving Parts. She was a regular, along with her husband drummer Jon Hiseman and bassist David "Dill" Katz in the underground "Cellar Bar" at South Hill Park Arts Centre in Bracknell during the late 1970s and 1980s.

She played the incidental music in the ITV police series A Touch of Frost, starring David Jason. She also played flute on Jeff Wayne's Musical Version of The War of the Worlds.

== Personal life and death ==
Thompson was married to Colosseum drummer Jon Hiseman, from 1967 until his death in June 2018. The couple's son Marcus was born in 1972, and their daughter Anna (now known as singer/songwriter Ana Gracey) in 1975.

An autobiography, Journey to a Destination Unknown, was published in 2020. Thompson died at a care home in Carshalton, London, on 9 July 2022, aged 77, after having Parkinson's disease for 25 years.

== Discography ==
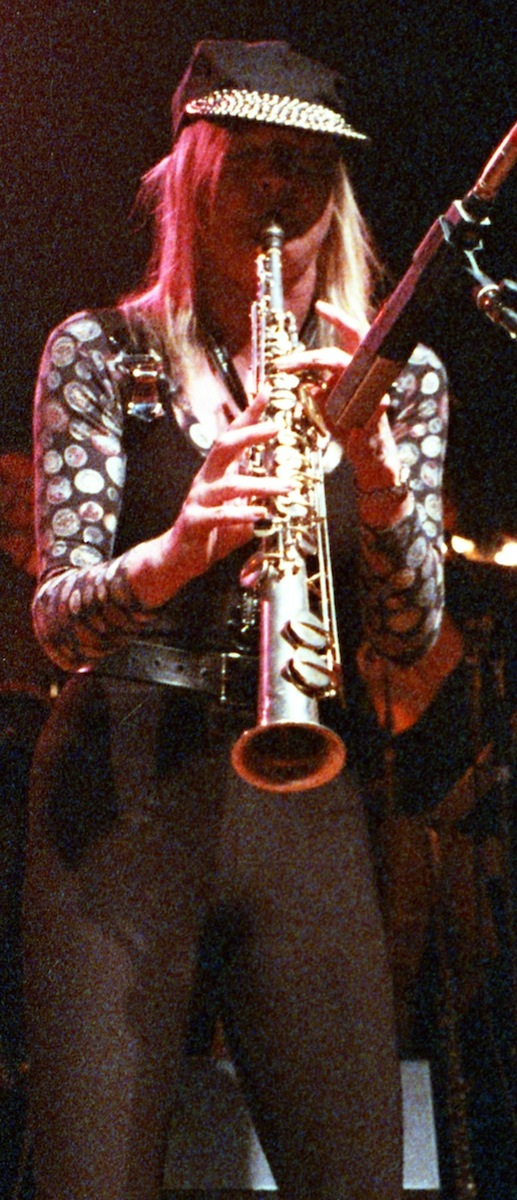
Barbara Thompson, 1992

Year	Album	Performer
1966	The Man Who Took the Valise Off the Floor of Grand Central Station at Noon	The She Trinity
1968	Angle	Howard Riley Trio
1969	Valentyne Suite	Colosseum
1970	Daughter of Time	Colosseum
1970	Michael Gibbs	Michael Gibbs
1971	Little Big Band	Keef Hartley Band
1973	The Beginning – Vol. 6: Keef Hartley Band	Keef Hartley Band
1973	Mike Taylor Remembered	Jon Hiseman, Neil Ardley, Ian Carr etc.
1976	The Roaring Silence	Manfred Mann's Earth Band
1976	Kaleidoscope of Rainbows	Neil Ardley
1977	Live in Schuetzenhaus	United Jazz + Rock Ensemble
1977	NDR Jazzworkshop '77	Various Artists
1978	Barbara Thompson's Paraphernalia	Barbara Thompson's Paraphernalia
1978	Barbara Thompson's Jubiaba	Barbara Thompson
1978	Variations	Andrew Lloyd Webber
1978	Harmony of the Spheres	Neil Ardley
1978	Teamwork	United Jazz + Rock Ensemble
1979	Wilde Tales	Barbara Thompson's Paraphernalia
1979	Tell Me on a Sunday	Marti Webb
1979	The Break Even Point	United Jazz + Rock Ensemble
1980	Live in Concert	Barbara Thompson's Paraphernalia
1980	Chance	Manfred Mann's Earth Band
1981	Cats	Andrew Lloyd Webber
1981	Live in Berlin	United Jazz + Rock Ensemble
1981	Zwischenbilanz – Das Beste aus den Jahren 1977 –1981	United Jazz + Rock Ensemble
1982	Mother Earth	Barbara Thompson
1982	Ghosts	Barbara Thompson/Rod Argent
1983	Cool Cat	Jeff Wohlgenannt and Friends
1983	Requiem	Andrew Lloyd Webber
1984	Pure Fantasy	Barbara Thompson's Paraphernalia
1984	United Live Opus Sechs	United Jazz + Rock Ensemble
1985	Frauen – Power	Various Artists
1985	Shadow Show	Barbara Thompson/Rod Argent
1985	Live im Berliner Metropol – Theater	Barbara Thompson's Paraphernalia
1986	Heavenly Bodies	Barbara Thompson
1986	Ganz schoen heiss, Man! About Time Too!	Jon Hiseman
1987	Highlights II	United Jazz + Rock Ensemble
1988	A Cry from the Heart	Barbara Thompson's Paraphernalia Live in London
1990	Songs from the Center of the Earth	Barbara Thompson
1991	Perspective '92	Various Artists
1991	Breathless	Barbara Thompson's Paraphernalia
1992	Round Seven	United Jazz + Rock Ensemble
1993	Everlasting Flame	Barbara Thompson's Paraphernalia
1995	Barbara Song	Barbara Thompson and the Medici String Quartet
1995	Lady Saxophone	Barbara Thompson's Paraphernalia
1996	Die Neunte von United	United Jazz + Rock Ensemble
1996	Women's Music from Celestial Harmonies	Various Artists
1998	Shifting Sands	Barbara Thompson's Paraphernalia
1998	The Sound Inside / Music and Architecture	Various Artists
1999	X	United Jazz + Rock Ensemble
2000	Thompson's Tangos and Other Soft Dances	Barbara Thompson's Paraphernalia
2001	Cuff Clout	Kate Westbrook and Mike Westbrook
2003	In the Eye of a Storm	Barbara Thompson's Paraphernalia
2004	2006	Manfred Mann '06 with Manfred Mann's Earth Band
2005	Never Say Goodbye	Barbara Thompson's Paraphernalia
2007	Live 05	Colosseum
2011	George Martin Presents	Barbara Thompson
2014	Live '05 (DVD)	Barbara Thompson's Paraphernalia
2014	Time On Our Side	Colosseum
2015	The Last Fandango	Barbara Thompson's Paraphernalia
2021	Bulletproof	Barbara Thompson's Paraphernalia with National Youth Jazz Orchestra

== Compositions ==
Year	Album	Performer
2006	Three Quartets	The Apollo Saxophone Quartet
2012	Perpetual Motion	The Apollo Saxophone Orchestra
