= Peter O'Mara =

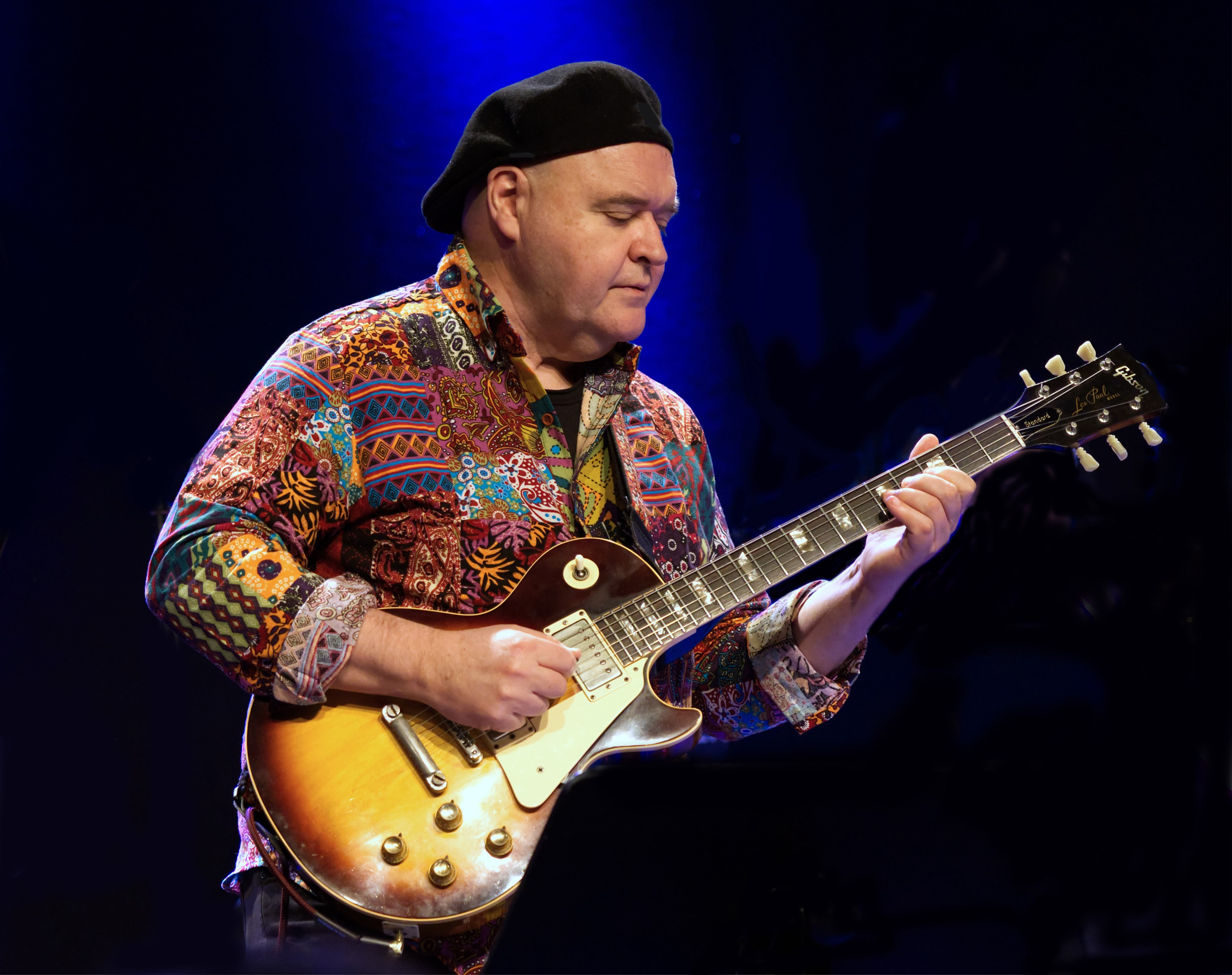
- Peter O'Mara playing a 1973 Les Paul Standard in December 2023

Background information
- Born: Peter John O'Mara; 9 December 1957 (age 68)
- Origin: Sydney, New South Wales, Australia
- Genre: Jazz
- Occupations: Musician, composer, teacher, author
- Years active: 1976–present
- Website: peteromara.com

Peter John O'Mara (born 9 December 1957) is an Australian-born jazz guitarist, composer, arranger, teacher and author. He has been based in Germany since late 1981.

== Biography ==
O'Mara is a self-taught musician and began his professional career in Sydney in 1976. He had private lessons with George Golla at the Academy of Guitar in Sydney as well as attending a number of jazz clinics presented by Jamey Aebersold including musicians like Dave Liebman, Randy Brecker, John Scofield and Hal Galper. He was a regular at jam sessions where he met musicians like Steve Murphy, Tommy Emmanuel, Michael Bartolomei, Willy Qua, Dale Barlow, Miroslav Bukovsky and Jackie Orszaczky. Steve Murphy and Jackie Orszaczky in particular gave Peter a lot of support, giving him free lessons, musical guidance and gigs. Jackie even produced Peter's first album "Peter O'Mara" which was eventually released on the independent label Batt Jazz in 1980, receiving widespread critical acclaim. After submitting this recording for a grant application he was awarded the prestigious Don Banks Memorial Fellowship for overseas study. At 21 Peter found himself performing regularly with seasoned jazz musicians like Errol Buddle, Barry Duggan and Stewie Speer as well as the big band at South Juniors Football Club backing artists like Patti Page and Al Martino. Peter spent three months in New York in summer 1981 going to concerts, jam sessions as well as having lessons from musicians like Dave Liebman, John Scofield, Jimmy Raney and Attila Zoller. Attila was so excited about Peter's musicality that he recommended him for a position teaching jazz guitar at the University of Memphis, Tennessee. Visa complications prevented him from taking up this opportunity.

He was a prizewinner for Jazz Composition 1980 & 1982, awarded by the NSW Jazz Action Society.

O'Mara moved to Munich, Germany in late 1981 and quickly established himself as one of the most versatile guitarists and composers in Europe. In 1982 he invited Australian saxophonist Dale Barlow to join him for a four-week tour of Germany and Austria. Peter had been able to secure Wayne Darling on bass and Bill Elgart on drums. The success of this project lead to the creation of a trio "Sundial" which performed regularly until 1990, also including tours with Kenny Wheeler as special guest. In 1985 Peter was invited by jazz bassist Detlev Beier to join the faculty of the Kontaktstudium at the Hochschule für Musik und Theater Hamburg as well as jazz workshops in Ibbenbüren and Bielefeld. It was here that he met trumpeter Uli Beckerhoff who soon involved Peter in various projects including the International Skoda All Star Band as well as an annual workshop in Trier, featuring musicians like Norma Winstone, Maria Pia De Vito, John Taylor, John Marshall, Matthias Nadolny and Bruno Castellucci. Another important contact was Austrian bassist Adelhard Roidinger with whom Peter performed in a variety of settings from duo to quintet. In late 1989 Adelhard asked Peter to join the faculty at the Bruckner University in Linz, Austria. In 1992 another teaching position presented itself, this time at the Richard Strauss Conservatorium in Munich, later becoming part of the Hochschule Für Musik und Theater. Peter holds tenured professorships at both of these institutions. In 1990 a chance meeting with saxophonist and composer Klaus Doldinger led to Peter being invited to join the legendary Jazz-Rock group Passport where he played for over 25 years, touring Europe a number of times as well as South Africa, Brazil, Morocco and New Zealand. As of late 2019 he is again performing occasionally with the group. Another opportunity came in 1999 when he was asked to join the legendary Jazz-Rock group "United Jazz and Rock Ensemble" where he also contributed two compositions to the group's cd "X".

On 9 December 2022, his 65th birthday, Peter presented a concert of his compositions arranged for big band at the Jazzclub Unterfahrt which he had composed and arranged during the Covid lockdown. The success of this project led to a number of similar concerts in München,(UMPA Big Band Jazz Institute) Nuremberg (Groove Legend Orchestra) and Linz.(Big Band Bruckner University)

His teaching activities include, among many workshops throughout Europe, Australia and New Zealand, tenured professorships for Jazz guitar at the Anton Bruckner Private University for Music, Drama, and Dance Austria, as well as the University of Music and Performing Arts Munich. He has published many instructional videos and is also author of four highly acclaimed books published by internationally renowned Jazz publishers Advance Music/Schott.

In 2012 Peter issued a jazz album, My Time on his label Marangani Records.

== Musicians that O'Mara has worked with ==
He has worked and recorded with many musicians on the international Jazz scene including: Kenny Wheeler, Joe Lovano, Dave Holland, Jon Christensen, Roberto Di Gioia, Adam Nussbaum, Bob Mintzer, Russell Ferrante, Anthony Jackson, Randy Brecker, Pee Wee Ellis, Fred Wesley, Joe Nay, Maria Joao, John Marshall, Patrick Scales, John Taylor, Charlie Mariano, Benny Bailey, Mike Nock, Albert Mangelsdorff, Barbara Thompson, Jon Hiseman, Ian Carr, Wolfgang Dauner, Ack van Rooyen, Johnny Griffin, Tony Lakatos, Tim Collins.

== Books ==
- A Rhythmic Concept for Funk/Fusion Guitar (Advance Music)
- A Modal Concept for Jazz Guitar (Advance Music)
- A Chordal Concept for Jazz Guitar (Advance Music) (1996)
- A Rhythmic Concept For Jazz Guitar (Advance Music) (2004)

== Discography ==
Selected discography

- Peter O'Mara (1980) Battjazz (BAT 2074)
- Prime Time Live at the Jazzlab ABC Jazz Records 2026
- It Is What It Is Bandcamp 2024
- Teletime Unit Records 2015
- My Time (2012) Marangani Records
- Acentric featuring Michael Hornek, Patrick Scales & Christian Lettner Marangani 2009
- YuMag featuring Michael Hornek, Patrick Scales & Christian Lettner Marangani 2008
- Mirage featuring Adam Nussbaum Pirouet 2003
- With-Within-Without Acoustic Music 2001
- Back Seat Driver featuring Johannes Enders Enja 1999
- Too Early For This World GLM Edition Collage 1998
- Heritage featuring Guido May & Biboul Darouiche SBF 1997
- A-Strain featuring Adrian Mears, Patrick Scales & Falk Willis SBF 1996
- Symmetry featuring Bob Mintzer, Marc Johnson & Falk Willis GLM Edition Collage 1995
- Travellers featuring Tony Lakatos, Roberto di Gioia, Anthony Jackson, Ernst Stroeer & Wolfgang Haffner SBF 1994
- Stairway featuring Tony Lakatos, Russell Ferrante, Anthony Jackson, Tom Brechtlein & Alex Acuña Enja 1993
- Kuranda featuring Henning Sieverts, Tony Lush & Mike Nock ITM Pacific 1991
- Avenue U featuring Joe Lovano, Roberto Di Gioia, Dave Holland & Adam Nussbaum Enja 1990
- Wheeler O'Mara Darling Elgart Koala Records 1991
