= United Jazz + Rock Ensemble =

German musical ensemble

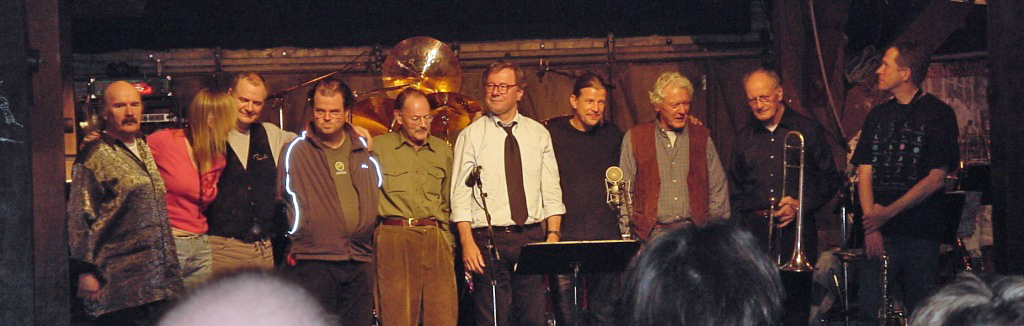
- United Jazz + Rock Ensemble Farewell Tour 2002

Background information
- Origin: Germany
- Genres: Jazz; Rock
- Years active: 1974–2002
- Past members: Wolfgang Dauner; Barbara Thompson; Jon Hiseman; Dave King; Ian Carr; Volker Kriegel; Rüdiger Baldauf; Ack van Rooyen; Albert Mangelsdorff; Christof Lauer; Eberhard Weber; Kenny Wheeler; Johannes Faber; Charlie Mariano; Thorsten Benkenstein; Peter O'Mara
- Website: www.ujre.net

The United Jazz + Rock Ensemble (abbr. "United" or "UJRE") developed from a group of jazz musicians that was formed for a 1974 to 1975 television show of Süddeutscher Rundfunk (South German Broadcasting). Almost all future members of "United" were present from the beginning.

The group played mostly original compositions ranging from jazz to rock. Charlie Mariano's experience with Indian music occasionally brought in ethnic elements. Because all band members extensively played in their own bands before and after UJRE was formed, the ensemble was often called the 'Band of Band Leaders'. Some of the members hold teaching positions with various musical colleges.

During the 27 years of its existence, the band produced nine albums and several compilation albums, all of them on Mood Records.

In 2002, the group went on their "Farewell Tour 2002". Among the reasons was Barbara Thompson's suffering from Parkinson's disease.

The final cast of 2002 was Wolfgang Dauner (piano), Barbara Thompson (saxophone), Jon Hiseman (drums), Dave King (bass), Ian Carr (trumpet), Volker Kriegel (guitar), Rüdiger Baldauf (trumpet), Ack van Rooyen (trumpet, fluegelhorn), Albert Mangelsdorff (trombone), Christof Lauer (saxophone)

Former members include Eberhard Weber, bass, Kenny Wheeler, trumpet, Johannes Faber, trumpet, Charlie Mariano, saxophone and ethnic instruments, Thorsten Benkenstein, trumpet, Peter O'Mara, guitar.

== Discography ==
=== Albums ===
- Live im Schützenhaus (1977)
- Teamwork (1978)
- The Break Even Point (1979)
- Live in Berlin (1981)
- United Live - Opus Sechs (1984)
- Round Seven (1987)
- Na endlich! - Live in Concert (1992)
- Live - Die Neunte von United (1996)
- X (1999)

=== Compilations ===
- Zwischenbilanz - Das Beste aus den Jahren 1977-1981 (1982)
- Highlights (1987)
- Highlights II (1994)
