= Patrick Scales =

Patrick Scales may refer to:

- Patrick Scales (musician) (born 1965), German bass guitar player
- Patrick Scales (American football) (born 1988), American football long snapper
