= Michael Sagmeister =

German guitarist

Michael Sagmeister (born 27 July 1959 in Frankfurt, West Germany) is a German jazz guitarist.

Sagmeister gained first prominence when he performed in 1975 at the Frankfurt Jazz Festival. The following year he founded the Michael Sagmeister Trio with Udo Kistner (playing bass) and Michael Kuettner on drums which became his most successful ensemble. In the 1980s he toured as a supporting act with the United Jazz and Rock Ensemble by which he became well known in the jazz scene.

From 1993 to 1997 Sagmeister was a lecturer at Berklee College of Music in Boston. In 1999 he became a tenured professor at the Frankfurt University of Music and Performing Arts. Sagmeister published three primers about Jazz guitar.

== Discography ==
- The Silent Spectacle with Christof Lauer, Jochen Schmidt, Michael Kuettner (Mood, 1982)
- Waiting for Better Days (Mood, 1983)
- Two Is a Crowd with Thomas Heidepriem (Mood, 1984)
- So Near So Far with Christoph Spendel (L+R 1987)
- Looking Out of My Window (Mood, 1987)
- A Certain Gift: Live (MGI, 1990)
- Still with Me (MGI, 1992)
- Here and Now (Acoustic Music, 1998)
- Binary with Christoph Spendel (Acoustic Music, 1999)
- Dedicato: Canzoni e Jazz with Camillo D'Ancona (Acoustic Music, 2000)
- Conversation with Pat Martino (Acoustic Music, 2000)
- Dualism with Dave Samuels (Timba, 2002)
- Repose (Acoustic Music, 2002)
- The Way We Feel About It with Britta Medeiros (Acoustic Music, 2003)
- When the Moment Sings with Britta Medeiros (Acoustic Music, 2005)
- Soul Ticket (Acoustic Music, 2006)
- True to the Moment (Jawo, 2010)
- Nell Anima with Antonella D'Orio (Jawo, 2012)
- Home (Acoustic Music, 2015)
- Power of Resistance (Acoustic Music, 2019)
- The Antonella Letters (Acoustic Music, 2020)
- Story Board (Acoustic Music, 2021)
