= Wolfgang Dauner =

German musician (1935–2020)

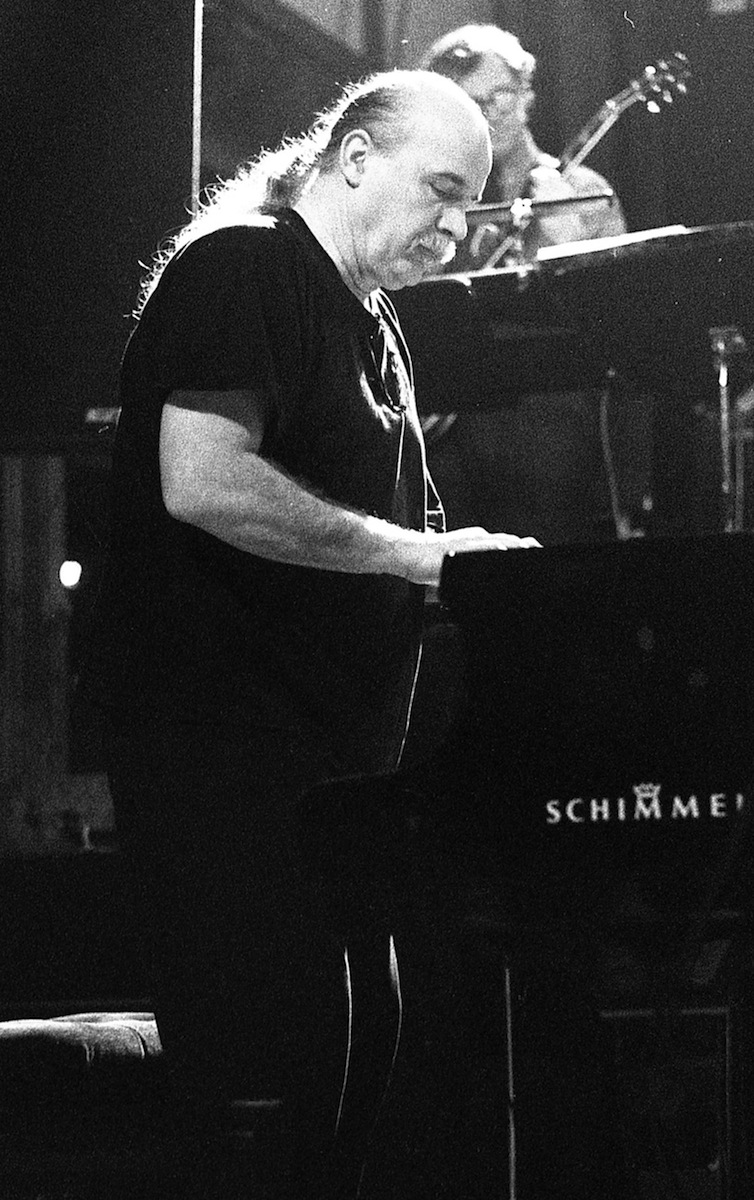
- Dauner performing with the United Jazz and Rock Ensemble, 1992

Background information
- Born: 30 December 1935; Stuttgart, Württemberg, Nazi Germany
- Died: 10 January 2020 (aged 84) Stuttgart, Baden-Württemberg, Germany
- Genres: Jazz, rock
- Occupation: Musician
- Instrument: Piano
- Years active: 1960s–2010s
- Labels: MPS, ECM
- Formerly of: United Jazz + Rock Ensemble
- Website: dauner-around.de

Wolfgang Dauner ([ˈvɔlfɡaŋ ˈdaʊ̯nɐ]; 30 December 1935 – 10 January 2020) was a German jazz pianist who co-founded the United Jazz + Rock Ensemble. He worked with Hans Koller, Albert Mangelsdorff, Volker Kriegel and Ack van Rooyen and composed for radio, television, and film.

== Education and career ==
Dauner attended the Musikhochschule in Stuttgart, where he focused on composition, piano, and trumpet. In the 1960s he belonged to a sextet led by Joki Freund. As the leader of his trio, he recorded for the first time in 1964, an early session in the history of European free jazz. In 1969, he was leader and composer for Radio Jazz Group Stuttgart. A year later he started the jazz rock band Et Cetera. With Hans Koller, he began the Free Sound & Super Brass Big Band. In 1975, he was a founding member of the United Jazz and Rock Ensemble. It was a collaboration of trombonist Albert Mangelsdorff, trumpeter Ack van Rooyen, sax player Charlie Mariano, bassist Eberhard Weber and guitarist Volker Kriegel. Additionally, he worked as a composer in radio, film, and television. He composed two chamber operas.

== Personal life ==
Dauner was married to Randi Bubat, a stage and costume designer. He was the father of German drummer Florian Dauner.

He died in Stuttgart on 10 January 2020.

== Discography ==
- Dream Talk (CBS, 1964)
- Free Action (SABA, 1967)
- Wolfgang Dauner/Eberhard Weber/Jurgen Karg/Fred Braceful (Calig, 1969)
- Requiem for Che Guevara/Psalmus Spei (MPS, 1969)
- The Oimels (MPS, 1969)
- Rischkas Soul (CTR, 1970)
- Output (ECM, 1970)
- Musica Sacra Nova II (Schwann AMS Studio, 1970)
- Changes (Mood, 1978)
- Grandison Musik fur Einen Film (Zweitausendeins, 1979)
- Two Is Company (Mood, 1983)
- Solo Piano (Mood, 1983)
- Meditation on a Landscape/Tagore (Mood, 1986)
- Zeitlaufe (Mood, 1988)
- One Night in 88 (Mood, 1988)
- Pas de Trois (Mood, 1989)
- Solo Piano 2 (Mood, 1994)
- Live in Concert (Mood, 1998)
- Filmmusik Studio Orchester (Mood, 2001)
- Dauner Zu House Remixed (Mood, 2001)
- Tribute to the Past (HGBS, 2010)
- Dauner/Dauner (Connector, 2014)
- Elektronische Mythen (Connector, 2016)
- 80 Jahre Das Jubilaumskonzert (Timba, 2017)

== Awards ==
Dauner received the Order of Merit of the Federal Republic of Germany, and in 2016 the Echo for his life's work. The same year, on the occasion of his 80th birthday, he was awarded a special prize of the 2016 Jazzpreis Baden-Württemberg, as one of the most versatile jazz pianists and keyboarders ("einer der vielseitigsten Jazzpianisten und -keyboarder unserer Zeit") which included a concert in Stuttgart. He also received the Staufermedaille of the state Baden-Württemberg then.

== See also ==
- Anne Haigis
