= Mary Bauermeister =

German artist (1934–2023)

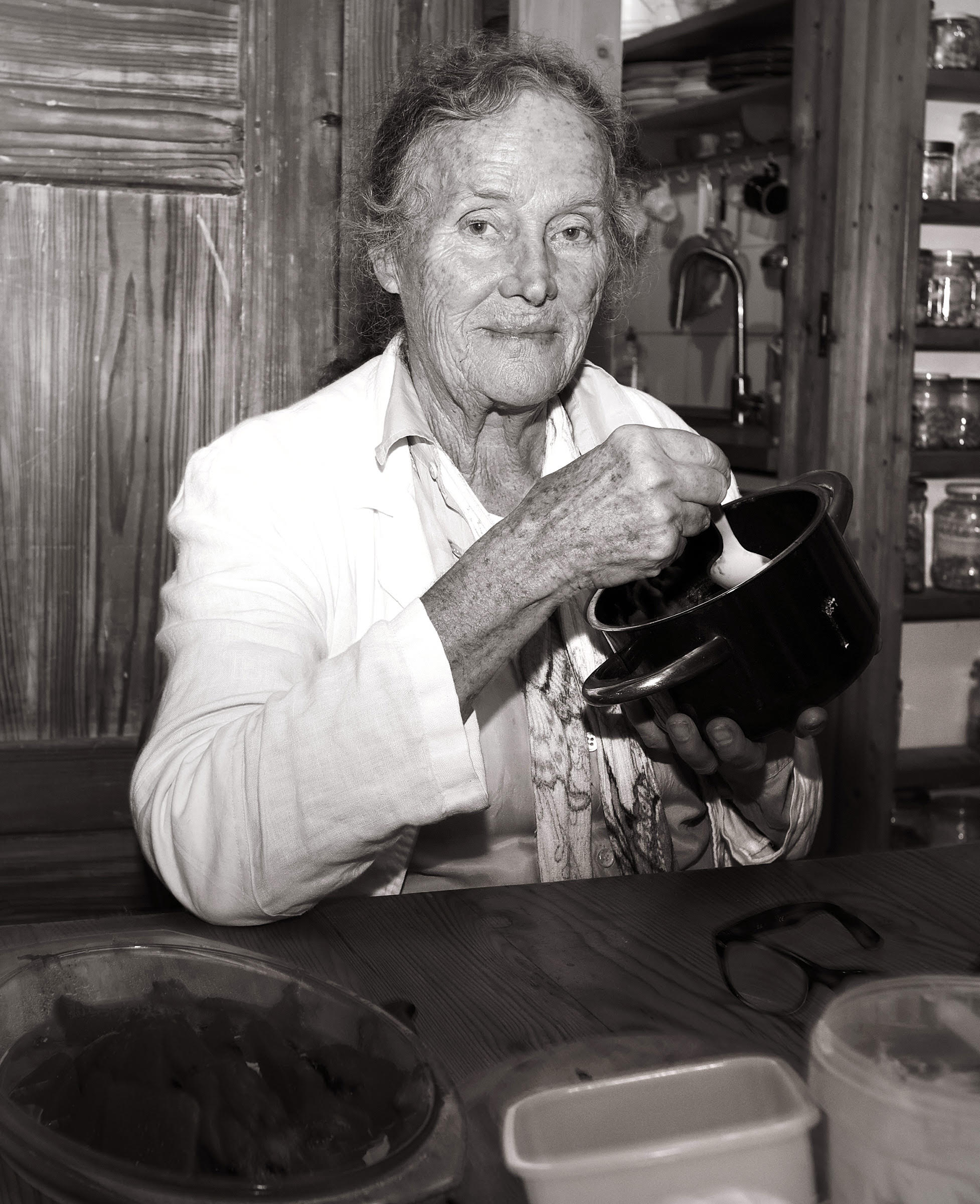
- Portrait by Oliver Mark, 2014
- Born: Mary Hildegard Ruth Bauermeister; 7 September 1934; Frankfurt am Main, Gau Hesse-Nassau, Germany
- Died: 2 March 2023 (aged 88); Rösrath, North Rhine-Westphalia, Germany
- Education: Hochschule für Gestaltung Ulm; Staatliche Schule für Kunst und Handwerk Saarbrücken
- Occupation: Artist
- Known for: Fluxus
- Spouse: Karlheinz Stockhausen (m. 1967; div. 1972)
- Children: 4, including Simon Stockhausen
- Awards: Order of Merit of the Federal Republic of Germany

Mary Hildegard Ruth Bauermeister (7 September 1934 – 2 March 2023) was a German artist who worked in sculpture, drawing, installation, performance, and music. Influenced by Fluxus artists and Nouveau Réalisme, her work addresses esoteric issues of how information is transferable through society. "I only followed an inner drive to express what was not yet there, in reality or thought", she said of her practice. "To make art was more a finding, searching process than a knowing." Beginning in the 1970s, her work concentrated on the themes surrounding New Age spirituality, specifically geomancy, the divine interpretation of lines on the ground.

== Biography ==
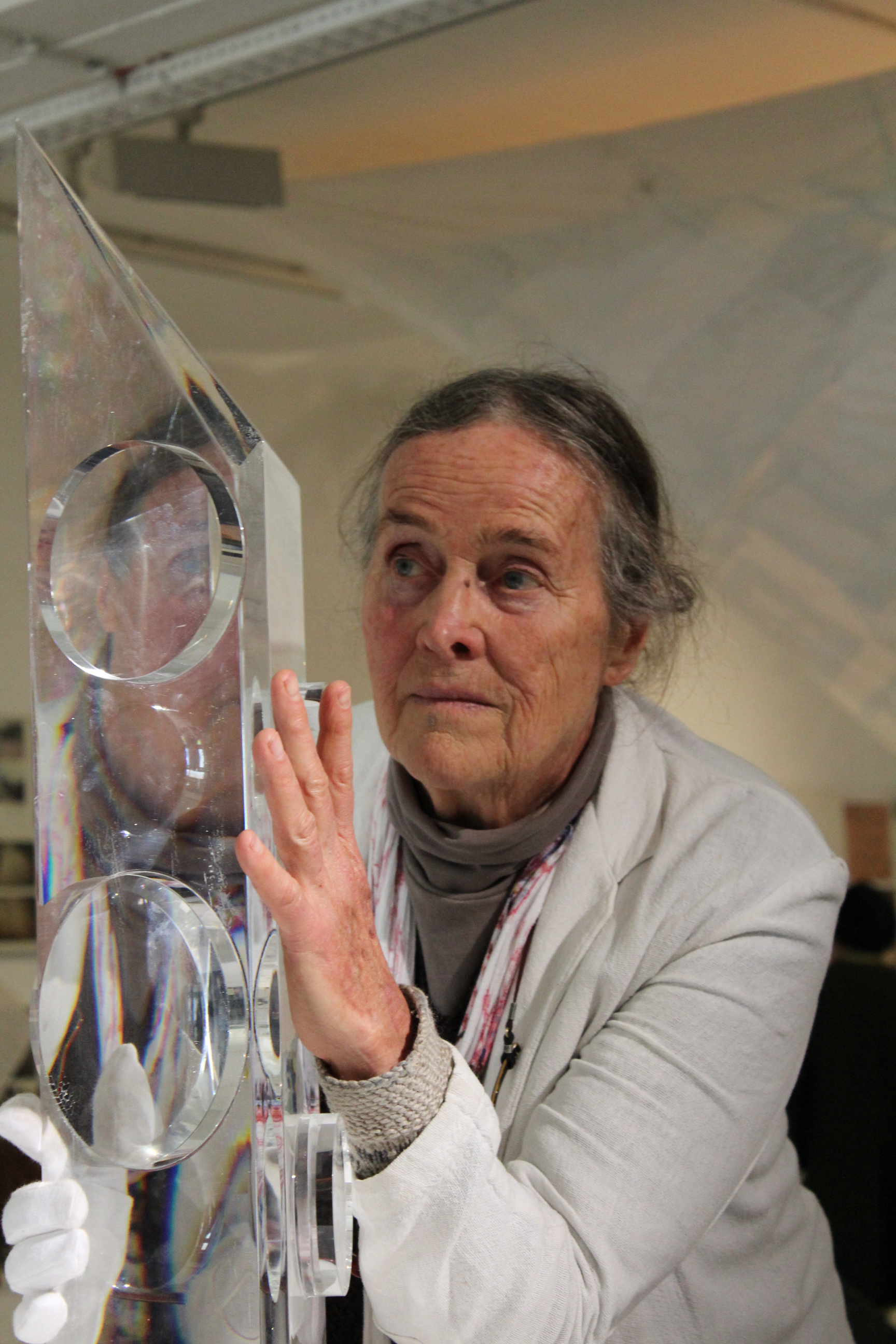
Bauermeister in 2012

=== Early life and artistic beginnings ===
Mary Bauermeister was born in Frankfurt am Main, the second of five children, to Wolf Bauermeister, a professor of genetics and anthropology, and Laura (Renzi) Bauermeister, a singer. She spent her early childhood in Kiel, before moving to the suburbs of Cologne. During the Second World War, she and her brother Martin lived in the mountains near the border with Austria. After the divorce of her parents, she lived with her father.

Bauermeister was artistically influenced in secondary school (1946 to 1954) by her drawing teacher, Günter Ott. She studied in 1954–55 at the Hochschule für Gestaltung in Ulm with the architect Max Bill, and in 1955–56 at the Staatliche Schule für Kunst und Handwerk in Saarbrücken with the photographer Otto Steinert. She settled in Cologne in 1956. In 1957 she met her future husband, the composer Karlheinz Stockhausen.

In 1960, in her studio at Lintgasse 28 in Cologne, she launched a series of gatherings of members of the evolving global artistic movement Fluxus. At her invitation, avant-garde poets, composers and visual artists such as Hans G. Helms, David Tudor, John Cage, Christo, George Maciunas, Wolf Vostell, George Brecht, and Nam June Paik organised unconventional concerts of the "newest music", readings, exhibits, and actions. These activities have been described as "comparatively non-hierarchical exchanges of information across national, disciplinary and age boundaries", contributing in that way to the character of the Fluxus movement which had been developing during the 1950s. The actions earned her the title Mutter der Fluxus-Bewegung (Mother of the Fluxux movement).

In 1961, she took part in Karlheinz Stockhausen's composition course at the Internationale Ferienkursen für Neue Musik in Darmstadt. Later that same year she collaborated with Stockhausen in a theatre piece titled Originale (Originals), which was given twelve performances at the Theater am Dom, Cologne, from 26 October to 6 November 1961. Amongst the performers were Bauermeister herself (as The Painter), Paik (Actions), Tudor (piano and percussion), and Helms (The Poet). In 1962 she had her first solo exhibition at the Stedelijk Museum in Amsterdam with a simultaneous day-long performance of electronic music under Stockhausen's direction.

=== Residence in New York ===
Drawn by the vitality of the Pop Art movement, in October 1962 Bauermeister relocated to New York City. In the artistic circles of Pop Art, Nouveau Réalisme, and Fluxus, she maintained friendships with Robert Rauschenberg, Jasper Johns, Niki de Saint Phalle, and Jean Tinguely. In New York Bauermeister enjoyed considerable artistic success. She exhibited regularly at the Galeria Bonino on 57th Street.

On 3 April 1967, in San Francisco, she married Stockhausen, with whom she had two children: Julika (born 22 January 1966) and Simon (born 5 June 1967). They were divorced in 1972. She had two younger daughters, Sofie (born July 1972, father David C. Johnson) and Esther (born 1974, father Josef Halevi).

=== Later life ===
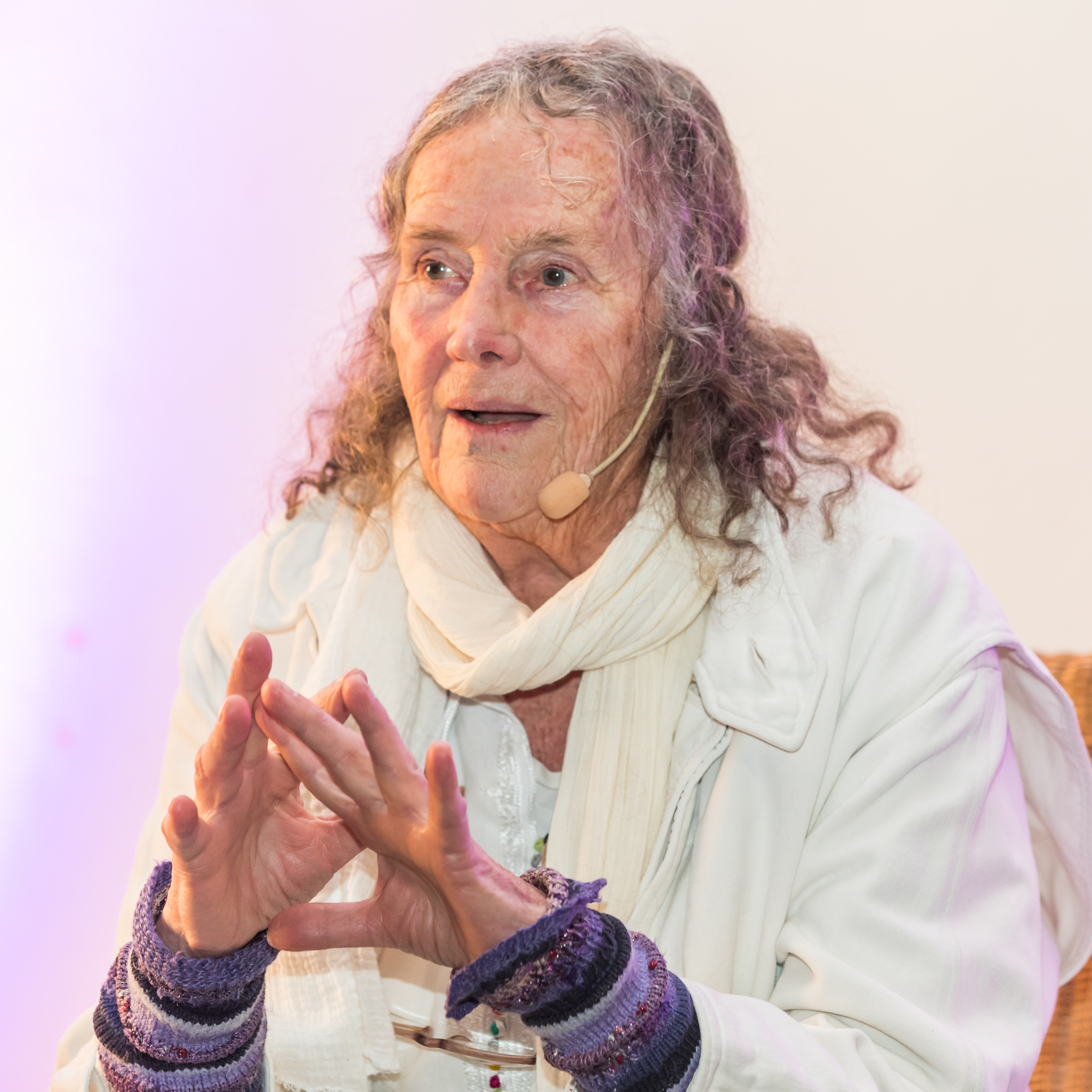
Bauermeister in 2019

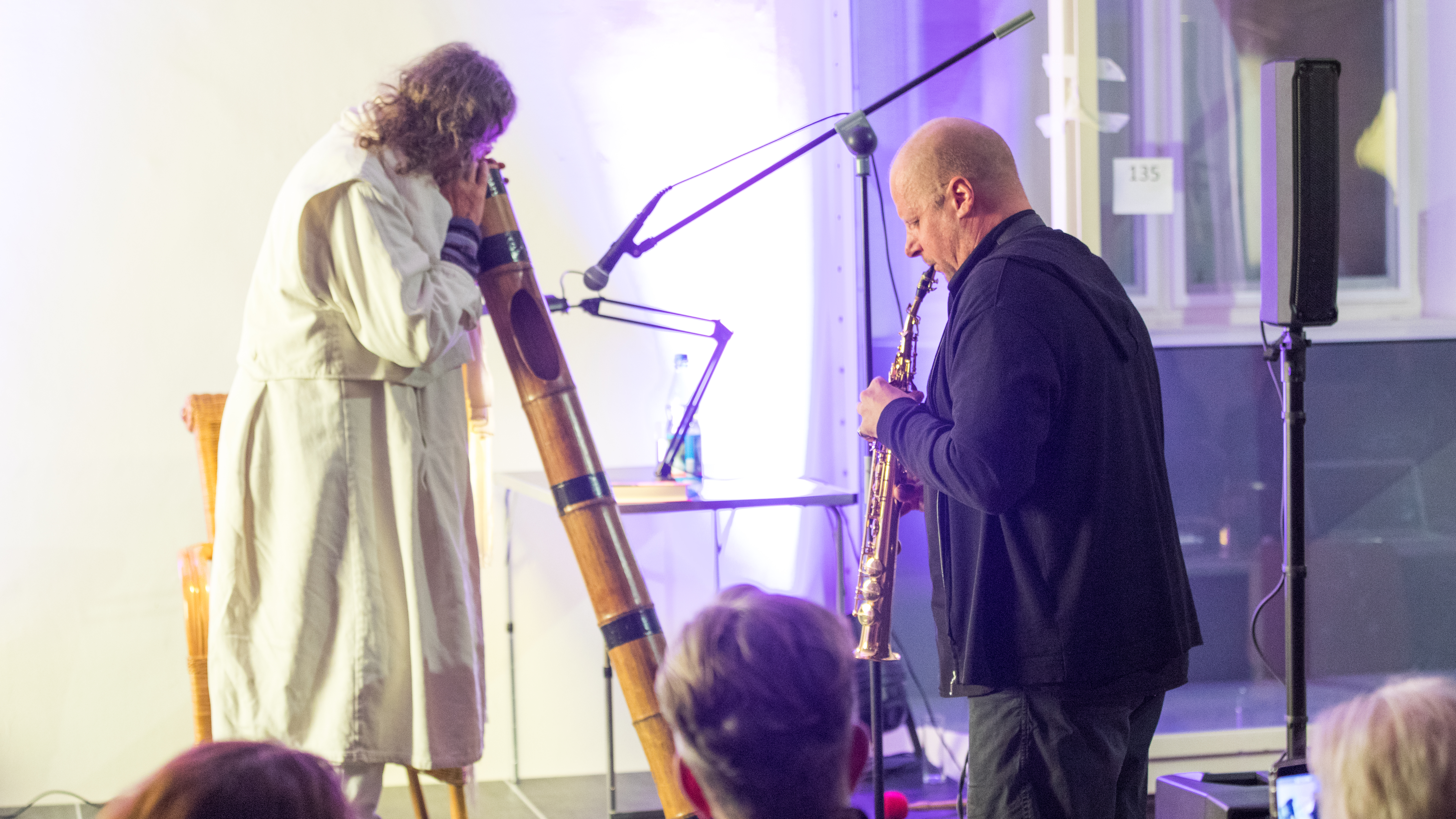
Bauermeister and her son Simon Stockhausen in 2019

In the 1970s, Bauermeister returned to Germany and began to occupy herself with marginal sciences, for example geomancy, the science of energy structures in the earth. She used the knowledge she garnered from these studies for the planning of gardens, which she implemented for public and private clients throughout the world.

She lived in Forsbach, part of Rösrath near Cologne, where she made her house a meeting place of artists, with huts and circus wagons in the garden to house young people. It was a place for communication and inspiration, with events and concerts. Over decades, she invited to a monthly meeting on a Sunday, with performances, readings, singing and discussions. She worked closely with the sculptor Hannes Lorenz and with students of the Alanus University of Arts and Social Sciences in Alfter.

On the occasion of her 70th birthday in September 2004, the Cologne Museum Ludwig acquired her 1963 wall installation Needless Needles and arranged a display of the work for several months. In 2019, Museum Ludwig acquired three more works by Bauermeister, Rundes Wabenbild, Magnetbild Schwarz-Weiss, and the relating 34 sketches Möglichkeiten Serieller Malerei. In 2018 Bauermeister signed an exclusive contract with the Michael Rosenfeld Gallery in Chelsea, Manhattan.

Bauermeister died in Rösrath on 2 March 2023, at the age of 88, after a serious illness over several months.

== Honours ==
On 15 June 2020, Bauermeister was awarded the Officer's Cross of the Order of Merit of the Federal Republic of Germany for her contributions to Germany's post-war art scene. In 2021, she received the Kunstpreis des Landes Nordrhein-Westfalen, then a new award.

== Exhibitions ==
- 1964 "Mary Bauermeister – paintings and constructions" Galerie Bonino, Buenos Aires
- 1965 "Linsenkästen" Galerie Bonino, Buenos Aires
- 1967 "Linsenkästen" II Galerie Bonino, Buenos Aires
- 1972 First retrospective in Mittelrhein-Museum, Koblenz
- 1972 Galerie Arturo Schwarz in Mailand
- 1985 Participation in the International Crystallography Congress and presentation of her works
- 1986 Kölner Kunstverein
- 2004 Museum Ludwig in Cologne
- 2010 Wilhelm Hack Museum in Ludwigshafen

== Bibliography ==
- Heller, Jules; Heller, Nancy (1995). "Bauermeister, Mary (1934– )". North American women artists of the twentieth century : a biographical dictionary. New York. ISBN 0-8240-6049-0. OCLC 31865530.
- Bauermeister, Mary. 1964. Bauermeister: Paintings and Constructions. 17 March – 18 April 1964. Exhibition no. 5. New York: Galeria Bonino, 1964.
- Bauermeister, Mary. 1965. Bauermeister: Paintings and Constructions, [exhibition, 13 April – 8 May 1965]. New York: Galeria Bonino.
- Bauermeister, Mary. 1967. Bauermeister: Paintings and Constructions, [exhibition, 7 February – 4 March 1967]. New York: Galeria Bonino.
- Bauermeister, Mary. 1972. Mary Bauermeister: Recent Paintings and Constructions. New York: Staempfli Gallery.
- Bauermeister, Mary; Skrobanek, Kerstin; Spieler, Reinhard; Wilhelm-Hack-Museum (2010). Welten in der Schachtel : Mary Bauermeister und die experimentelle Kunst der 1960er Jahre = Worlds in a box : Mary Bauermeister and the experimental art of the Sixties. Bielefeld: Kerber. ISBN 978-3-86678-449-9. OCLC 681481129.
- Bauermeister, Mary, Alfio Castelli, et al. 1963. Two Sculptors, Four Painters: Catalog of an Exhibition Held at the Galeria Bonino, 18 Dec to 11 January 1964. Exhibition no. 2. New York: Galeria Bonino.
- Bauermeister, Mary, et al. 1969. Blackwhite: Exhibition of Paintings and Constructions by Bauermeister ... [et al.]. Catalog of an exhibition held at Morris R. Williams Center for the Arts, LaFayette College, 12–27 October 1969 and circulated by the Smithsonian Institution Traveling Exhibition Service. Easton, Pennsylvania: Lafayette College.
- Bauermeister, Mary, and Karlheinz Stockhausen. 1963. Manifestatie Mary Bauermeister en Karlheinz Stockhausen: schilderijen, elektronische muziek: Catalogus van een tentoonstellingen, Haags Gemeentemuseum, 1/2-24/2 1963. Den Haag: Gemeentemuseum.
- Matz, Reinhard; Historisches Archiv der Stadt Köln (1993). Das Atelier Mary Bauermeister in Köln 1960 – 62; intermedial, kontrovers, experimentell (in German). Köln. ISBN 978-3-924491-43-7. OCLC 214535577.
- Esman, Rosa, and Henry Geldzahler. 1966. New York International .... Design consultant: Elaine Lustig Cohen. [New York]: Tanglewood Press.
- Merrill, Peter C. (1997). German immigrant artists in America : a biographical dictionary. Lanham, Md.: Scarecrow Press. ISBN 0-8108-3266-6. OCLC 35686096.
- Perneczky, Géza . 1972. Mary Bauermeister: dal 3 al 29 febbraio 1972 alla Galleria Schwarz Catalogo (Galleria Schwarz) no. 114 . Milano: Galleria Schwarz.
- Pfennig, Reinhard. "Dreissig deutsche Maler: Situation 1962". Veranstaltet vom Oldenburger Kunstverein, vom 11. November bis 9. Dezember 1962. Oldenburg: Der Kunstverein, 1962
- Bauermeister, Mary; Schüppenhauer, Christel; Galerie Schüppenhauer (2004). Mary Bauermeister "all things involved in all other things". Köln. ISBN 978-3-926226-57-0. OCLC 76497628.
- Siano, Leopoldo. 2016. "Between Music and Visual Art in the 1960s: Mary Bauermeister and Karlheinz Stockhausen". Grant, M. J.; Misch, Imke (2016). The musical legacy of Karlheinz Stockhausen : looking back and forward. Hofheim am Taunus. ISBN 978-3-95593-068-4. OCLC 951086124.
- State University College at Potsdam, New York Art Gallery. 1972. Women in Art: Mary Bauermeister, Ellen Cibula, Dorthy Dehner, Harriet FeBland, Audrey Flack, Linae Frei, Sue Fuller, Dorothy Hood, Marisol, Eleanore Mikus, Beverly Pepper; an exhibition of painting and sculpture, 3 to 28 March 1972. Potsdam, New York: New York State University College, Potsdam, Art Gallery.
- Stockhausen, Karlheinz, and Mary Bauermeister. 1962. Karlheinz Stockhausen, electronische muziek & Mary Bauermeister, schilderijen: Stedelijk Museum, Amsterdam 2–25 juni 1962 .... Catalogs / Stedelijk Museum Amsterdam, 311. "Malerische Konzeption" (folded chart) by Mary Bauermeister laid in. Amsterdam: Stedelijk van Abbemuseum.; Groninger Museum.
- Bauermeister, Mary; Velte, Maria; Mittelrhein-Museum Koblenz (1972). Mary Bauermeister; Gemälde und Objekte, 1952–1972 (in German). München: Buchund Offsetdruckerei W. Biering. OCLC 959266.
