= Mild Maniac Orchestra =

German jazz-rock band

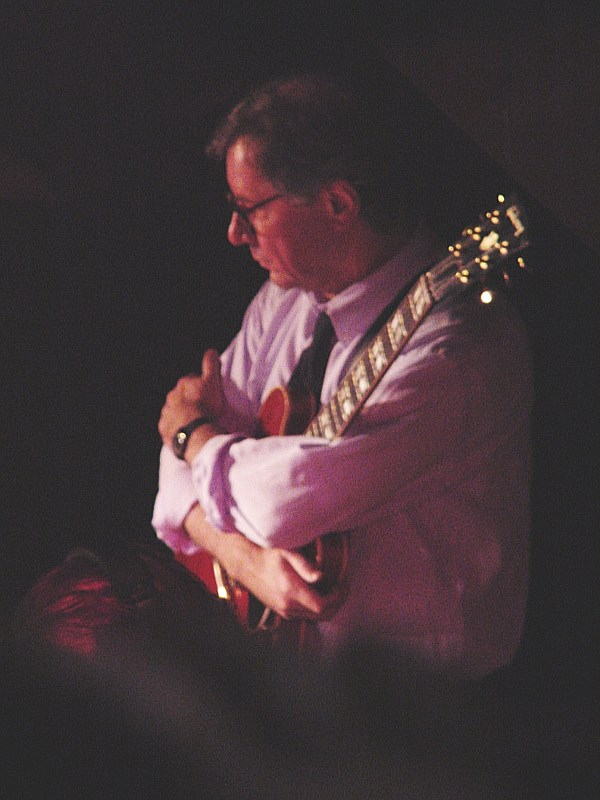
Volker Kriegel, founder of the Mild Maniac Orchestra

The Mild Maniac Orchestra was a German jazz-rock band founded in the 1970s by guitarist Volker Kriegel. It existed until the beginning of the 1980s. The band was named after Kriegel's album Mild Maniac from 1974. Another founding member was keyboard player Rainer Brüninghaus, although he does not appear on the published recordings.

From 1975 on Kriegel appeared with his band as Mild Maniac Orchestra. Between 1976 and 1980 he recorded four albums under the name Volker Kriegel & Mild Maniac Orchestra. The band included Thomas Bettermann (keyboards), Hans Peter Ströer (bass), and Evert Fraterman (drums).

== Awards ==
- 1982 Deutscher Schallplattenpreis (German Record Award), Künstler der Jahres 1982 (Musician of the Year 1982), category Ensemble Pop National

== Discography ==
- Octember Variations (1976)
- Elastic Menu (1977) with Nippy Noya (percussion)
- Long Distance (1979) with Hans Behrendt (percussion)
- Live in Bayern (1980) with Hans Behrendt (percussion)
