= Simon Stockhausen =

German composer

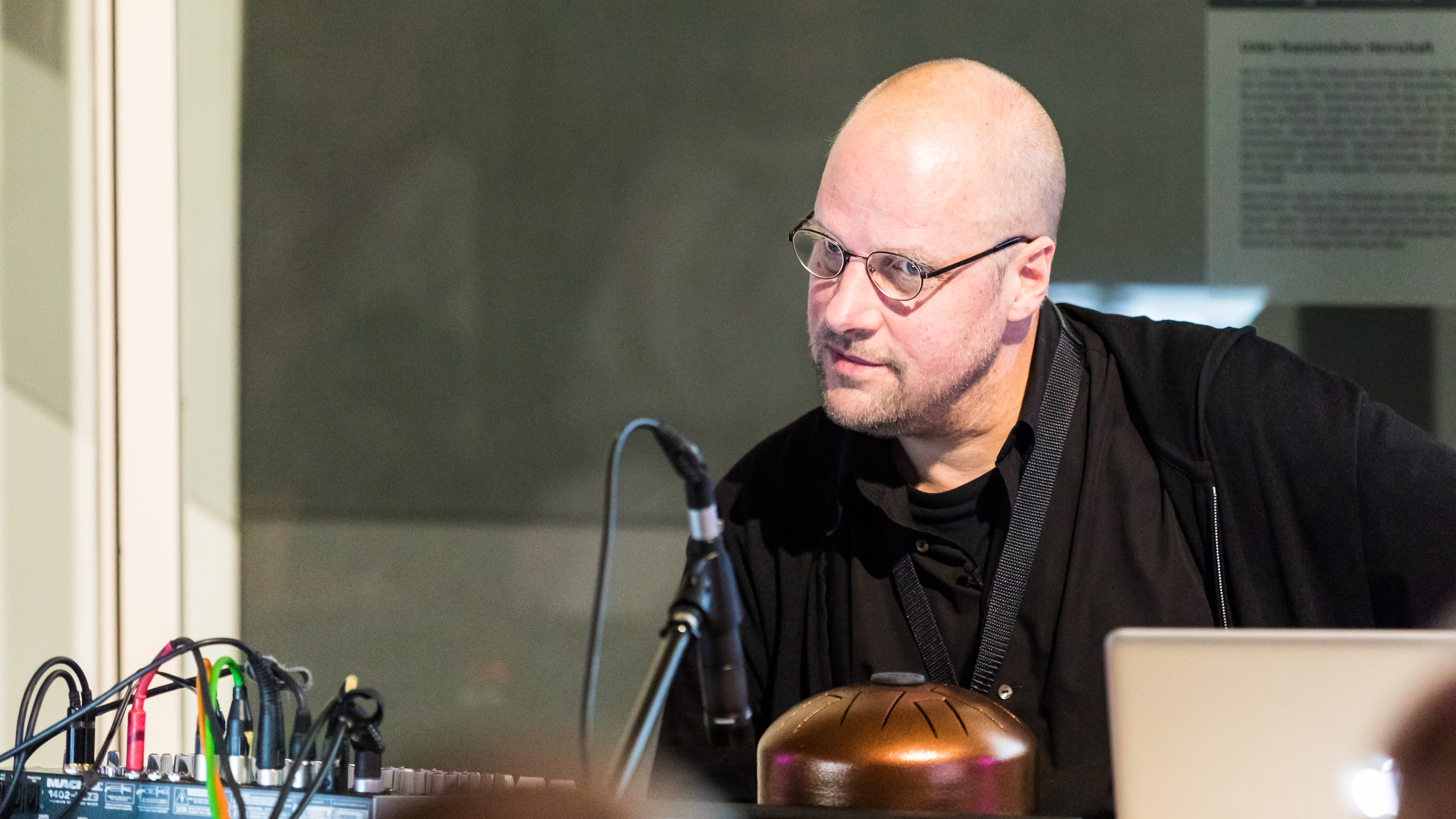
Simon Stockhausen, 2019

Simon Stockhausen (born 5 June 1967) is a German composer. His parents are the artist Mary Bauermeister and the composer Karlheinz Stockhausen; the musician Markus Stockhausen is his half-brother.

== Life ==
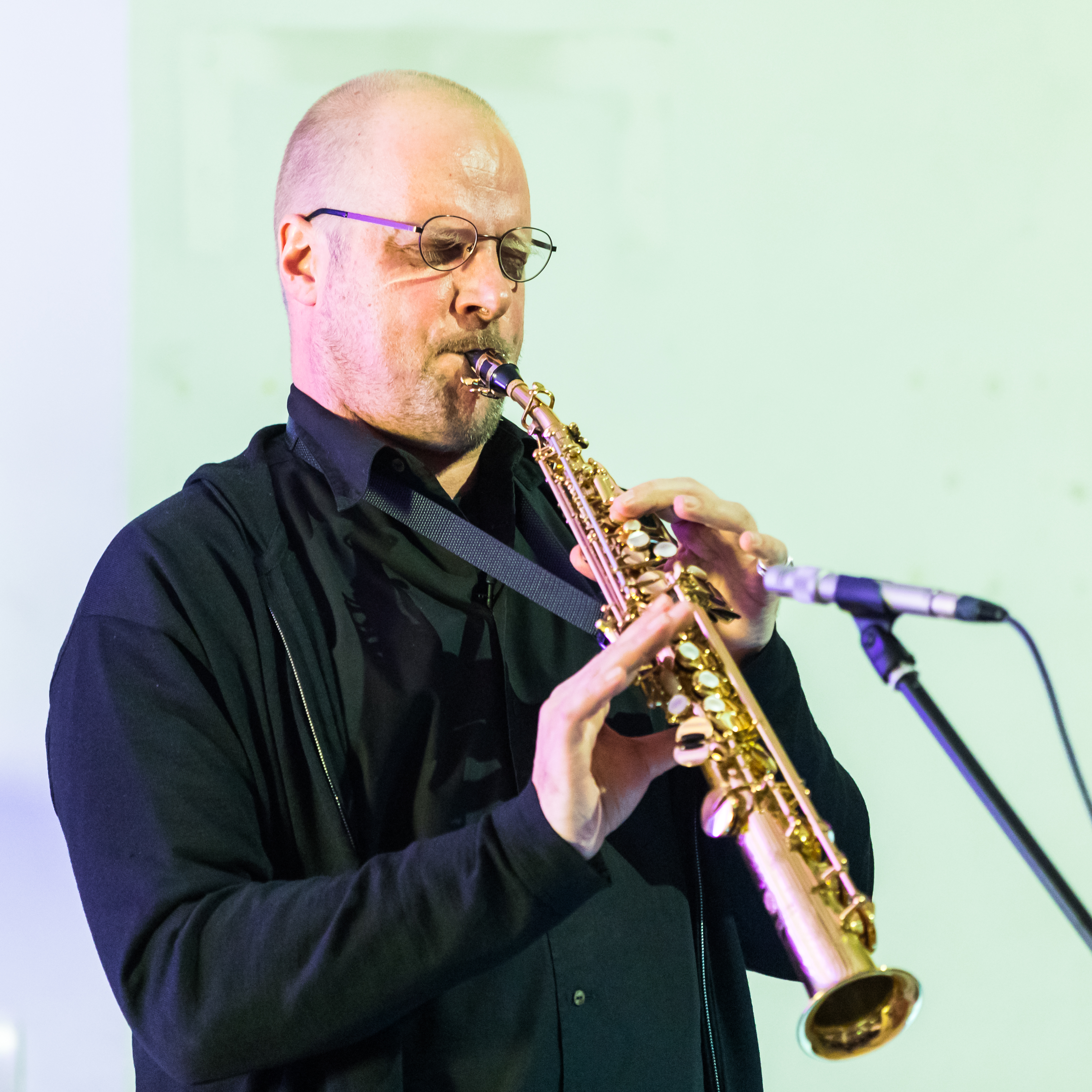
Simon Stockhausen plays a soprano saxophone (2019)

Born in Bergisch Gladbach, Stockhausen received his musical education from his father and various private teachers. He wrote his first compositions as a child and in 1980, he appeared publicly as a synthesizer player in the performance of his father's composition Sternklang. In 1981, he performed as soprano saxophonist at the Teatro alla Scala in the opera Donnerstag aus Licht. After graduating from the Freiherr-vom-Stein-Schule Gymnasium Rösrath in 1986, Stockhausen gave concerts worldwide with his father's ensemble and was involved in the production and composition of electronic music for two operas from the cycle Licht. In 1996 he ended the collaboration with his father.

Since 1982, he has also worked in various ensembles (including Kairos, Aparis and Possible Worlds) with his half-brother Markus Stockhausen. Together with Jo Thönes, they formed the jazz trio Aparis, which gave international concerts and published two CDs at ECM. In 1991, Simon and Markus together composed the piece Köln Music Fantasy for the fifth anniversary of the Kölner Philharmonie and in 1996, the piece Jubilee for the tenth anniversary. After the release of their album nonDuality in 2005 the musical paths of the half-brothers separated.

Since 1991 Simon Stockhausen has been composing for various German ensembles in the field of contemporary music, including the Ensemble Modern and the MusikFabrik. This was followed by jazz compositions and performances as a keyboardist with Lalo Schifrin and James Morrison, among others, with whom he founded the band On the Edge in 2003. Since 1998, he has composed numerous incidental music for plays, including for the Berliner Ensemble, the Schauspielhaus Dortmund, the Staatstheater Mainz, the Schauspiel Frankfurt, the Bad Hersfelder Festspiele, the Düsseldorfer and Kölner Schauspielhaus, as well as the Nationaltheater Mannheim (drama). He worked with directors such as Peter Palitzsch, Burkhard C. Kosminski and András Fricsay.

For the Neuköllner Oper, Simon Stockhausen composed the music theatre piece Rheingold Feuerland based on Wagner Das Rheingold to a libretto by Bernhard Glocks in 2011.

In 1999 he founded the group MIR with Manos Tsangaris – for whom he also realised various theatre music as co-composer – in which the Cologne percussionist Jaki Liebezeit was also involved. He has also performed in a wide variety of formations as a keyboardist, live electronic musician and soprano saxophonist, including with Vince Mendoza, Peter Erskine, Michael Riessler, Péter Eötvös, the WDR Big Band, the Sharoun Ensemble and the Berliner Philharmoniker. In 2004, he founded the band Royce with Christian Weidner. Stockhausen also composed numerous soundtracks for feature films, documentaries and short films, including the cinema documentary Trip to Asia – Die Suche nach dem Einklang and feature films by Israeli film director Amos Gitai.

Stockhausen and an ensemble of musicians put together for the 47th Grimme-Preis on 1 April 2011, designed the musical supporting programme for the award ceremony. For each of the 16 prizes awarded, Stockhausen composed his own music, which referred to the respective prize-winning films.

In the 2012/2013 concert season, Stockhausen was an artist in residence with the Hamburg Symphony and premiered a total of five new works, including a major orchestral piece entitled "Doktrin der Ruhe".

Since 2016, Simon has also been working with his mother, the artist Mary Bauermeister, and composed, among other things, the work Farbrausch for the picture series Farbrausch, which was performed on various occasions.

== Composition method ==
In his compositional work, Simon Stockhausen makes use of computer technology. He is particularly interested in the potential musicality of sounds and the exploration of sound in all its dimensions. Textures, rhythms and harmonies are derived from noises by sound synthesis and then processed in compositions. Through fundamental processes, e.g. time parameters, dynamic changes through compression and the possibility to play back recordings, recorded sounds are changed, i.e. processed. This approach can be described in musicological terms as "compositional sound synthesis". He uses found sounds as material to create music in which the boundaries between pop, jazz, electronics and new music dissolve. The preparation of the material with the help of compositional sound synthesis has long been part of the composition process of a music that can detach language from its message and make sounds musical.
