= Rüdiger Baldauf =

German musician

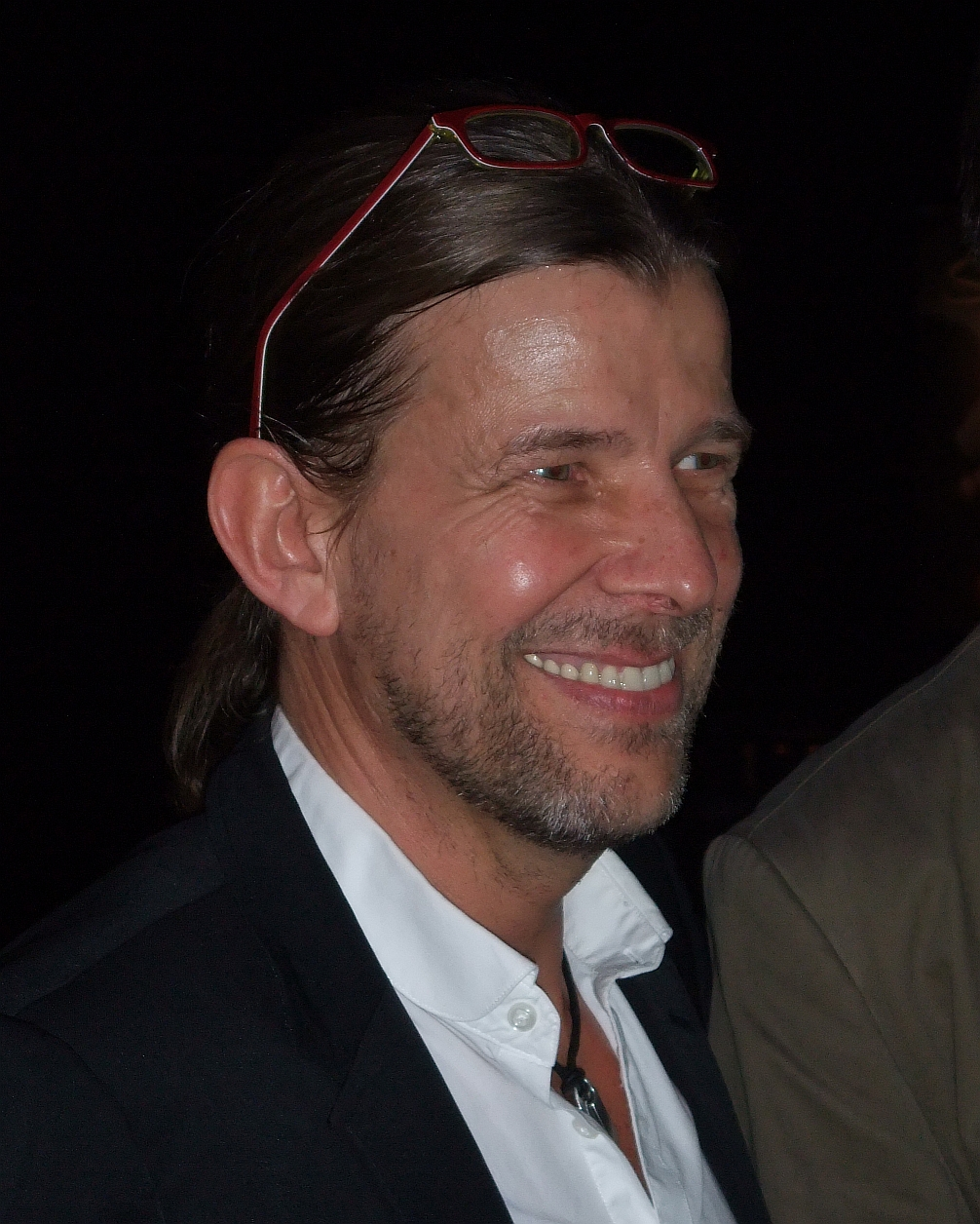
- Born: 31 January 1961 (age 65)
- Occupations: Jazz musician, Trumpet player, Composer and Arranger.

Rüdiger Baldauf (born 31 January 1961 in Bensberg, North Rhine-Westphalia) is a German jazz musician, trumpet player, composer and arranger.

== History ==
- 1980: secondary-school examinations Nicolaus Cusanus Gymnasium in Bergisch Gladbach.
- 1981 - 1985: Conservatory Köln
- 1985 - 1988: scholarship holder at the Herbert von Karajan Stiftung in Berlin for Classic Trumpet (professors: Robert Platt and Ack van Rooyen)

Baldauf played with James Brown, Liza Minnelli, Seal, Shirley Bassey, Michael Bublé, and he was on tour with Maceo Parker, Joe Zawinul, Shirley Bassey, Udo Jürgens.

- 1989 - 1999: professor for jazz trumpet at the Conservatory Köln
- 1999 - 2002: member of the United Jazz + Rock Ensemble
- 1992 - 2010: member of the Paul Kuhn Orchestra
- 1992 - 2010: regular guest in various German big bands, especially the WDR Big Band Köln

During the late 1980s and the 1990s Baldauf contributed to some 100 studio albums. He was member of the RTL Allstars which was the band of the first German Comedy TV show called RTL Samstag Nacht.

Since 2003 Baldauf has been playing trumpet in Stefan Raab's Tonight Show TV total in the band heavytones.

In June 2010 Baldauf launched his first solo album with the title Own Style. Prominent guests accompanied him, like Till Brönner, Nils Landgren, Ack van Rooyen, Andy Haderer and Max Mutzke.

== Music ==
Baldauf completed a classical education but at an early age he preferred Jazz, Funk and Soul. He used to play the first trumpet in Leonard Bernstein's West Side Story as well as Neue Musik of Mauricio Kagel.

== Discography ==
=== As leader ===
- Own Style (Mons, 2010)
- Trumpet Night (Mons, 2012)
- Jackson Trip (Mons, 2017

=== As guest ===
- 1994 Eddie Harris Last Concert with the WDR Big Band Köln
- 1996 Gianna Nannini Profumo
- 1999 Bernard Purdie Soul to Jazz
- 2000 Wolfgang Haffner Music
- 2002 No Angels When the Angels Swing
- 2003 Paul Kuhn/Bert Kaempfert Remember When
- 2006 SEAL One Night to Remember
