= Volker Kriegel =

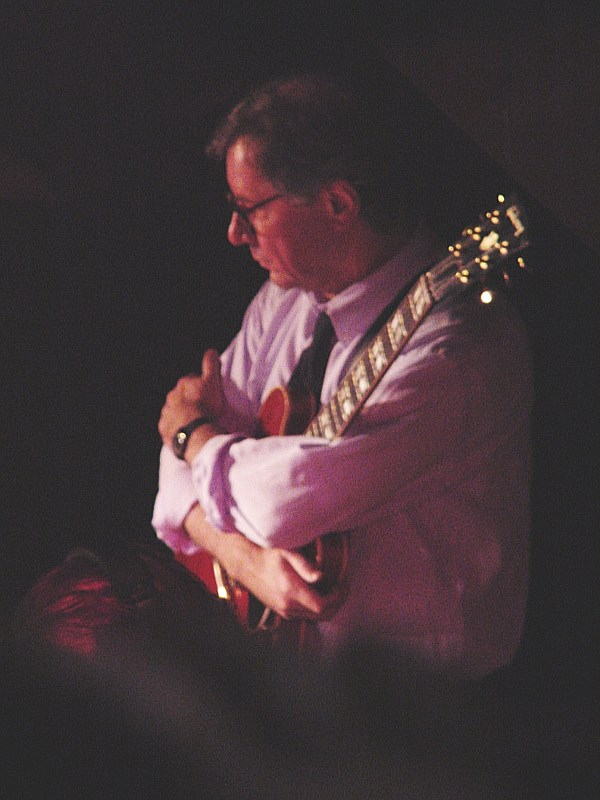

Background information
- Born: 24 December 1943; Darmstadt, Germany
- Died: 14 June 2003 (aged 59); Spain
- Genres: Jazz, Jazz rock, jazz fusion
- Occupation(s): Musician, composer, author, cartoonist
- Instrument: Guitar
- Years active: 1962–2003
- Labels: MPS, Mood
- Formerly of: Mild Maniac Orchestra, United Jazz + Rock Ensemble

Volker Kriegel (24 December 1943 – 14 June 2003) was a German jazz guitarist and composer who was a founding member of the United Jazz + Rock Ensemble. He was also an author and a cartoonist.

== Biography ==
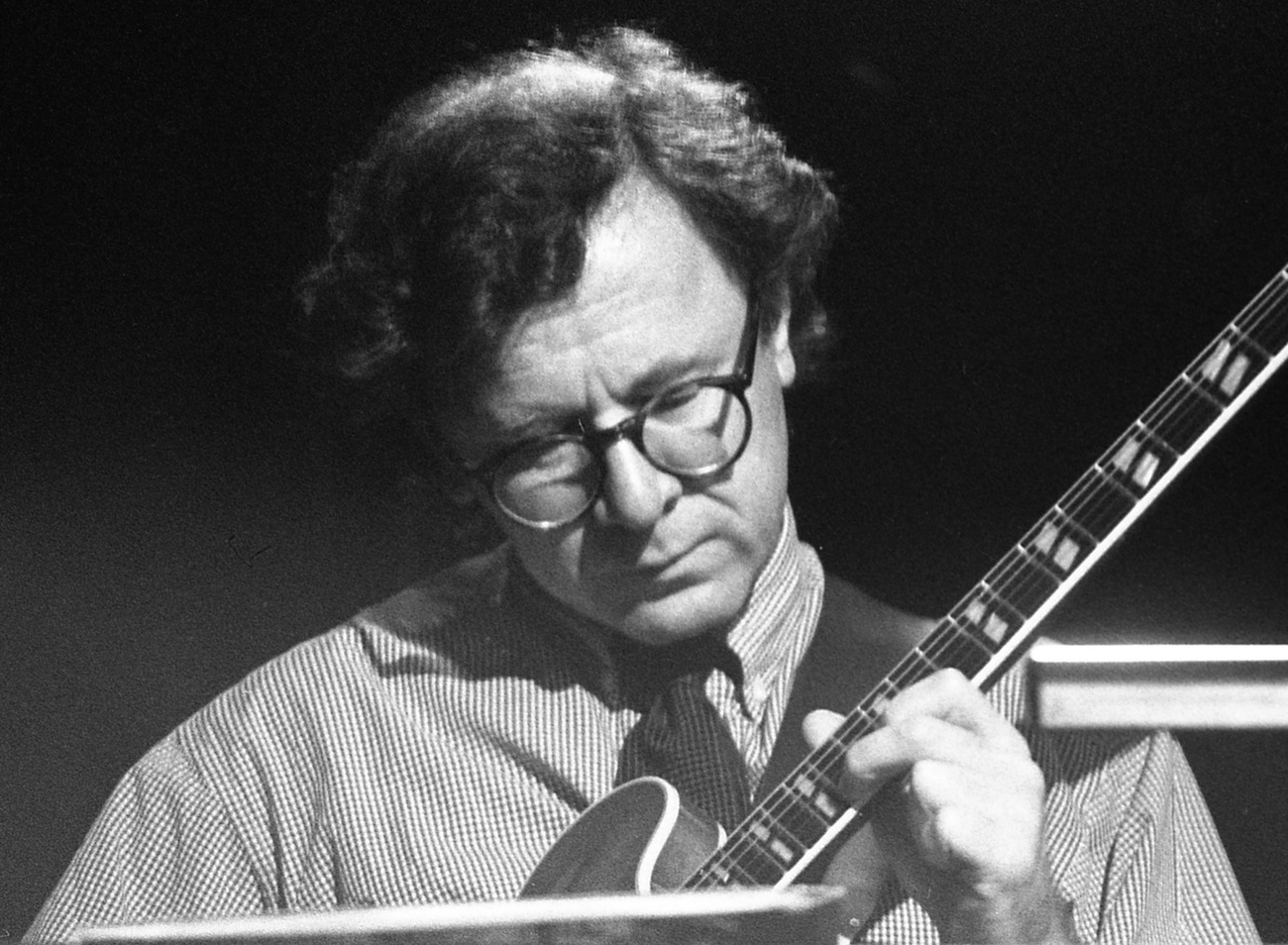
Volker Kriegel performing with United Jazz and Rock Ensemble in 1992

Kriegel was born in Darmstadt on 24 December 1943. He began to play the guitar at the age of 15.

Kriegel studied sociology with Theodor Adorno, but in 1962 was already playing in a band with Albert and Emil Mangelsdorff in Frankfurt, and abandoned his studies. He was then in a fusion band led by an American expatriate, vibraphonist Dave Pike, and recorded the album Noisy Silence – Gentle Noise (1969). Concurrent with his work with Pike, Kriegel started Spectrum, and in 1975 also formed the Mild Maniac Orchestra. He recorded with Don "Sugarcane" Harris on the album Keep on Driving (MPS, 1970), then signed with MPS and released the jazz-rock album Spectrum (1971). Five years later he started the United Jazz + Rock Ensemble, a shifting collective that at various times included Charlie Mariano, Albert Mangelsdorff, Ack van Rooyen, and Barbara Thompson. In 1977 Kriegel co-founded the label Mood Records, which released his own music and that of the United Jazz + Rock Ensemble.

Kriegel drifted from music and started writing children's books. "During the 1990s, he ceased his activities as a leader and concentrated instead on working as a composer and on his longstanding second career as a cartoonist; his illustrations appeared in newspapers, magazines, books, and animated films." Manchmal ist es besser, man sagt gar nix, a book containing some of his cartoons and writings on jazz and other topics, was published in 1998. He reunited the Ensemble for a tour in 2002. He died of cancer in Spain on 15 June 2003.

== Discography ==
=== As leader ===
- With a Little Help from My Friends (Liberty, 1968) with Peter Trunk, Günter Lenz, Peter Baumeister, Claudio Szenkar
- Spectrum (MPS 1971, re-released 2003) with John Taylor, Peter Trunk, Cees See, Peter Baumeister
- Inside: Missing Link (MPS, 1972) with Albert Mangelsdorff, Alan Skidmore, Heinz Sauer, John Taylor, Eberhard Weber, John Marshall, Peter Baumeister, Cees See
- Lift! (MPS, 1973) with Zbigniew Seifert, Stan Sulzmann, Eberhard Weber, John Taylor, John Marshall
- Mild Maniac (MPS, 1974) with Rainer Brüninghaus, Eberhard Weber, Peter Giger, Joe Nay
- Topical Harvest (MPS, 1975) with Rainer Brüninghaus, Hans Peter Ströer, Ray Mantilla, Peter Giger, Joe Nay, Albert Mangelsdorff, Peter Coura
- Octember Variations (MPS, 1976)
- Elastic Menu (MPS, 1977)
- House Boat (MPS, 1978)
- Long Distance (MPS, 1979)
- Live In Bayern (MPS, 1980)
- Journal (Mood, 1981)
- Schöne Aussichten (Mood, 1983)
- Palazzo Blue (Mood, 1987)

With United Jazz + Rock Ensemble

- Live in Schützenhaus (Mood, 1977)
- Teamwork (Mood, 1978)
- The Break Even Point (Mood, 1979)
- Live in Berlin (Mood, 1981)
- United Live Opus Sechs (Mood, 1984)
- Round Seven (Mood, 1987)
- Na endlich! (Mood, 1992)
- Die neunte von United (Mood, 1996)

=== As sideman ===
With Klaus Doldinger

- Doldinger Goes On (1967)
- Doldinger Jubilee Concert, Passport (1974)

With Don "Sugarcane" Harris

- Keep on Driving (1970)
- Got the Blues (1972)
- New Violin Summit (1972)
- Keyzop (1975)
- Flashin' Time (1976)

With Dave Pike

- Noisy Silence – Gentle Noise (1969, MPS)
- Four Reasons (1969, MPS)
- Live at the Philharmonie (1969, MPS)
- Album (1971, MPS)
- Infra Red (1972, MPS)
- Salomao (1973, MPS)

With others

- Emil Mangelsdorff: Swinging Oil Drops (1966)
- Kühn Brothers & The Mad Rockers (1969)
- Jonny Teupen: Harpadelic (1969, MPS)
- Curt Cress Clan: CCC (1975)

== Sources ==
- Carr, Ian; Fairweather, Digby; Priestley, Brian. Jazz: The Rough Guide, Penguin, 1995, ISBN 1-85828-137-7
