= Emil Mangelsdorff =

German jazz musician (1925–2022)

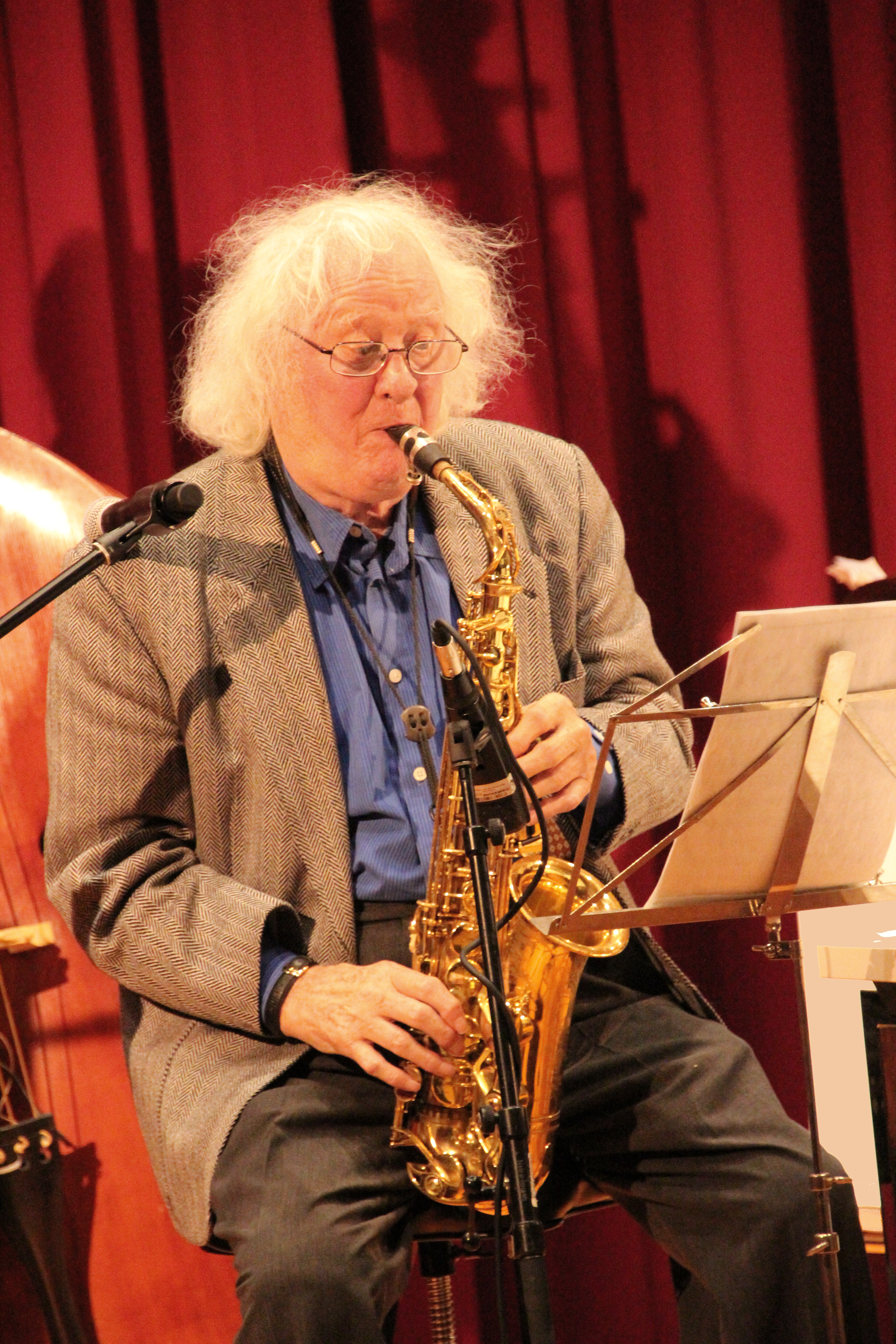
- Mangelsdorff in 2015

Background information
- Born: 11 April 1925; Frankfurt am Main, Hesse-Nassau, Prussia, Germany
- Died: 20 January 2022 (aged 96) Frankfurt, Hesse, Germany
- Genres: Jazz
- Instruments: alto saxophone, soprano saxophone, clarinet, flute

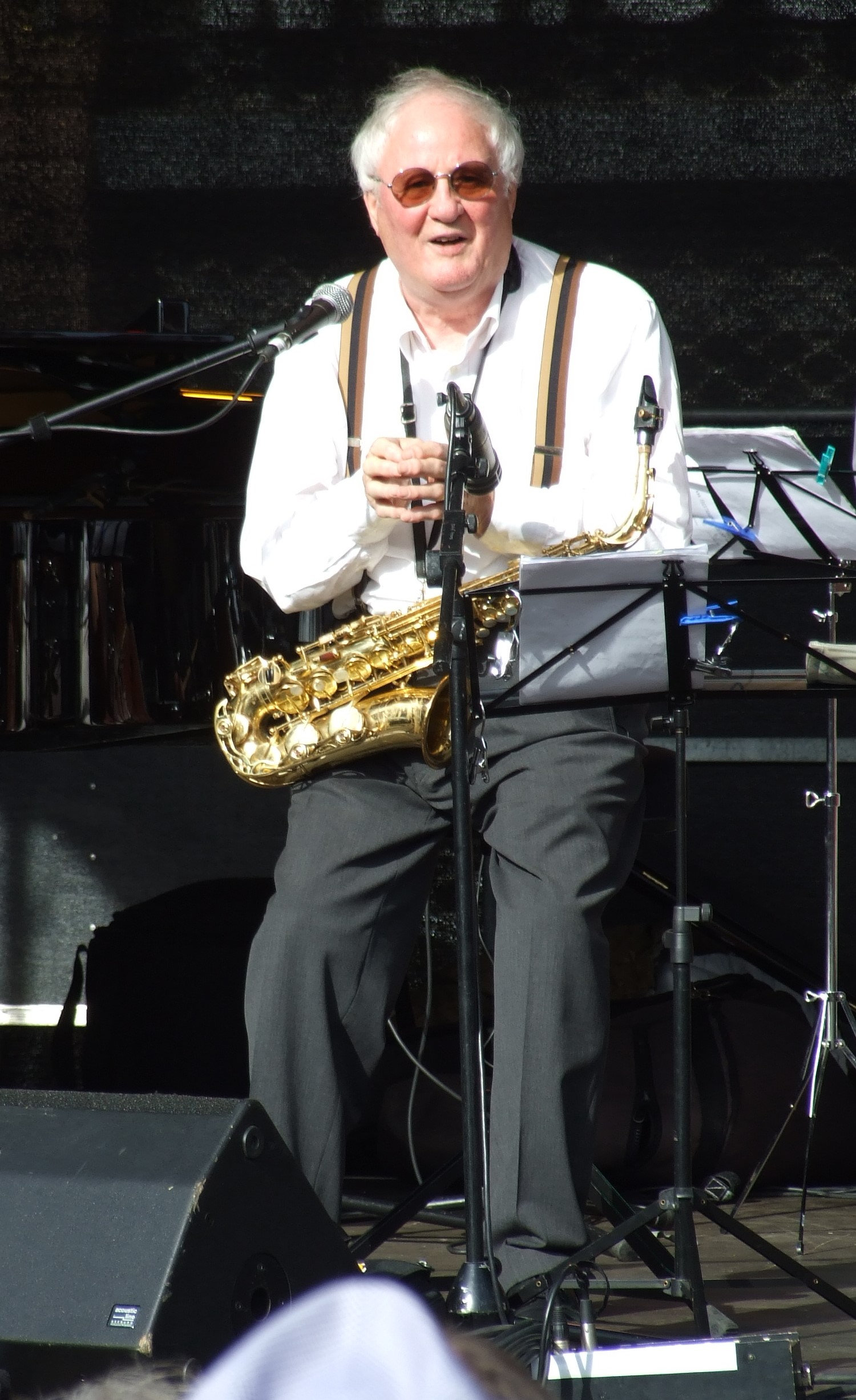
Mangelsdorff in 2009

Emil Mangelsdorff ([ˈɛmɪl ˈmaŋl̩s.dɔʁf]; 11 April 1925 – 20 January 2022) was a German jazz musician who played alto saxophone, soprano saxophone, clarinet and flute. He was a jazz pioneer under the Nazi regime which led to his imprisonment. After World War II and years as a prisoner of war, he was a founding member of the jazz ensemble of Hessischer Rundfunk in 1958. He played with several groups and was active, also as an educator, until old age.

== Life and career ==
Mangelsdorff was born in Frankfurt, as the son of the bookbinder Emil Albert Joseph Mangelsdorff (1891–1963), born in Ingolstadt, and his wife Luise, née Becker (1896–1976), from Wertheim. Mangelsdorff was introduced to jazz at age nine, when his mother switched to Radio Luxemburg, and he heard the voice of Louis Armstrong. His first instrument was accordion. In 1942 and 1943, Mangelsdorff studied clarinet at the Hoch Conservatory in Frankfurt. As a member of the Frankfurt Hotclub Combo, with trumpeter Carlo Bohländer, bassist Hans Otto Jung and drummer Hans Podehl, he performed jazz and became a figurehead for Swing Youth, which led to his being imprisoned by the Gestapo. He was forced into the German army and was a Russian prisoner of war for four years. In 1949, he returned to Frankfurt and decided to become a professional jazz musician. He played in the groups of Joe Klimm and Jutta Hipp, and was also a member of the Frankfurt All Stars and of the jazz ensemble of the broadcaster Hessischer Rundfunk from 1958. In 1966, he founded Swinging Oil Drops, with Joki Freund, Volker Kriegel, Fritz Hartschuh and Günter Lenz.

Mangelsdorff was influenced by swing. He continued to develop musically, playing bebop, fusion and cool. In 1964, Mangelsdorff wrote an instruction manual for jazz saxophone. He played with Charles Mingus in New York and performed often in the Jazzkeller (jazz cellar) in Kleine Bockenheimer Straße, Frankfurt, sometimes together with his brother, trombonist Albert Mangelsdorff. He gave his last concert in Frankfurt's Holzhausenschlösschen on 1 November 2021. He also informed in schools about the Nazi era as a witness of the time, continuing remembrance work until old age.

His first wife Simone, an operatic soprano, died in 1973. Monique (died 2018) was his second wife. Mangelsdorff died in Frankfurt am Main on 20 January 2022, at the age of 96.

== Awards ==
- 1995 Hessian Jazz Prize
- 1995 Goethe Plaque of the City of Frankfurt
- 2001 Wilhelm Leuschner Medal
- 2006 Goethe-Plakette of Hesse
- 2008 Officer's Cross of the Order of Merit of the Federal Republic of Germany
- 2015 Honorary professorship of the state of Hesse
