= Tenoration =

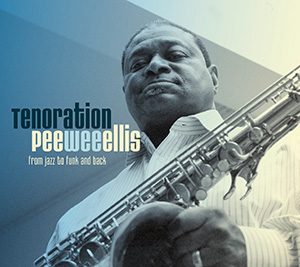

Studio album by Pee Wee Ellis
- Released: April 2011
- Recorded: November 2010
- Genre: Jazz, funk
- Length: 73:39
- Label: Art of Groove
- Producer: Joachim Becker

Pee Wee Ellis chronology
Different Rooms (2005)	Tenoration (2011)	The Spirit of Christmas (2013)

Professional ratings
Review scores
Source	Rating
AllMusic	link
Jazzandbeyond	link

Tenoration is a 12-track jazz and funk double album by Pee Wee Ellis. It is an all-instrumental album. Its subtitle, From Jazz to Funk and Back reflects Pee Wee Ellis' affection to both jazz and funk music. On this production, Ellis uses two different rhythm sections. CD1 emphasizes mainly on funk, CD 2 mainly on jazz.

== Reception ==
The album received positive reviews from critics. AllMusic rated it four stars with reviewer Hal Horowitz noting: "The playing is tough, uncompromising, and filled with substantial jazzy improvisation while keeping the backbeat rugged, especially on a lean but sizzling ten-minute take of Cannonball Adderley's Sticks... and prove that Ellis is equally adept at either jazz or funk, but perhaps best when he joins the two." Wayne Dawson of Jazzandbeyond wrote: "The first disk offers the best jazz-funk your ever likely to hear. The stamina levels are intense and everyone holds the line with the over ten minute 'Sticks' (a piece written by Julian Adderley) representing a high point...The second disk is just as up on it, with the same drummer carried over for the entire set (how could you let him go?).

== Track listing ==
=== Disc 1 ===
1. Slanky P (Pee Wee "Alfred" Ellis / Jim Payne) – 7:15
2. Gittin’ a little hipper (James Brown /(Pee Wee "Alfred" Ellis / Bud Hobgood) – 3:01
3. Bon Bonn ((Pee Wee "Alfred" Ellis) – 7:00
4. Sticks (Cannonball Adderley) – 10:42
5. Zig Zag (Pee Wee "Alfred" Ellis / Paul Rusky / Jim Schneider) – 7:01
6. At Last (Mack Gordon / Harry Warren) – 6:04 #"Out of the Blue" (Wright, Terry) – 2:15

=== Disc 2 ===
1. You've Changed (Bill Carey / Carl Fischer) – 4:30
2. Sticks (Cannonball Adderley) – 4:11
3. Parlayin’ (Pee Wee "Alfred" Ellis) – 4:30
4. Sonnymoon for Two (Sonny Rollins) – 8:37
5. Now Go On (Pee Wee "Alfred" Ellis) – 6:01
6. Freedom Jazz Dance (Eddie Harris) – 4:47

== Personnel ==
- Guitar: Tony Remy (1-6)
- Keyboards: Dan Moore (1-6)
- Piano: Gareth Williams (7-12)
- Bass: Patrick Scales (1-6)
- Bass: Laurence Cottle (7-12)
- Drums: Guido May
