= Patrick Scales (musician) =

German electric bass guitarist and teacher

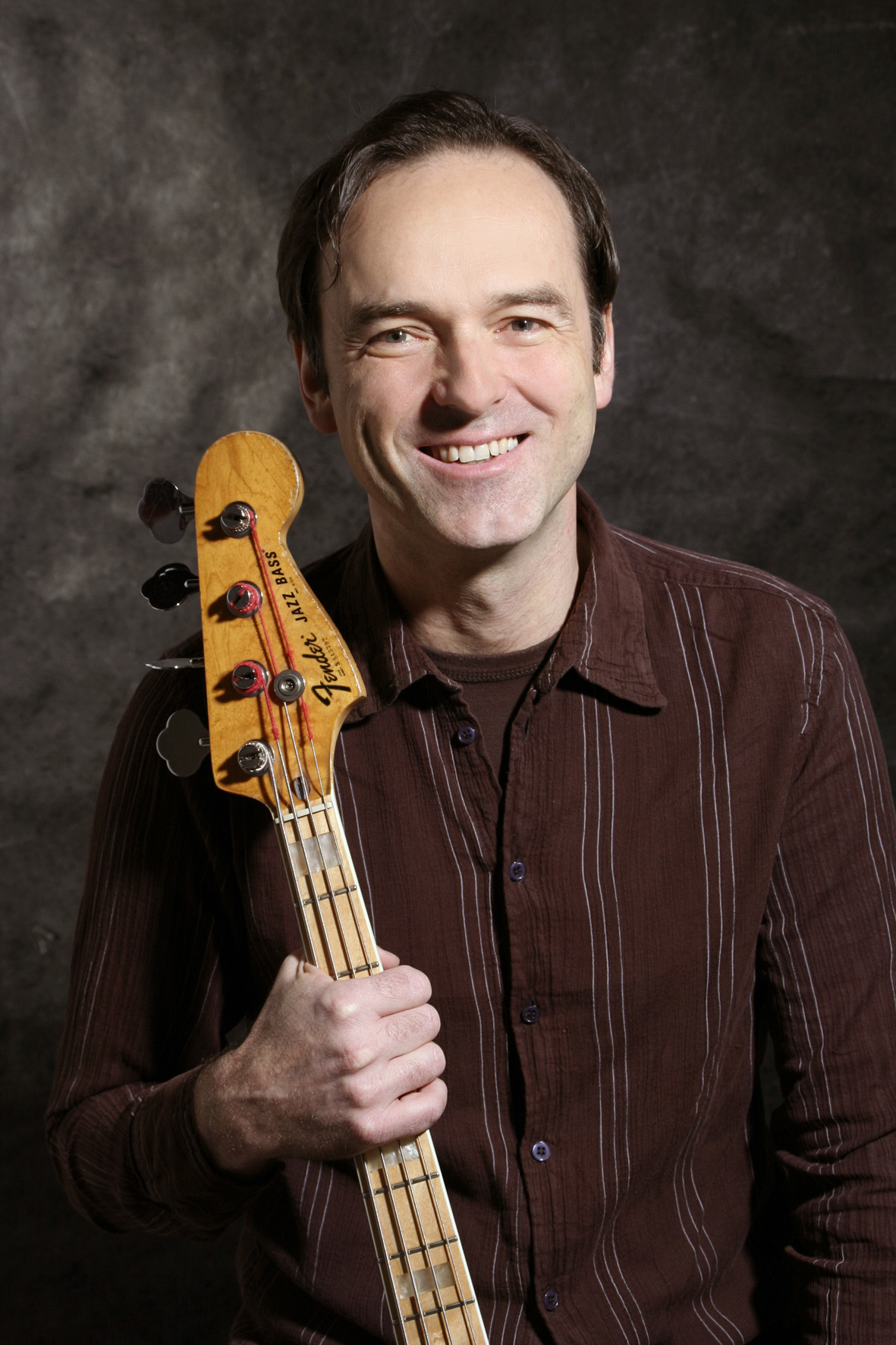

Background information
- Born: 24 March 1965 (age 61)
- Origin: Garmisch-Partenkirchen, Germany
- Occupations: Bass player, teacher
- Instrument: Electric bass
- Website: www.patrickscales.com

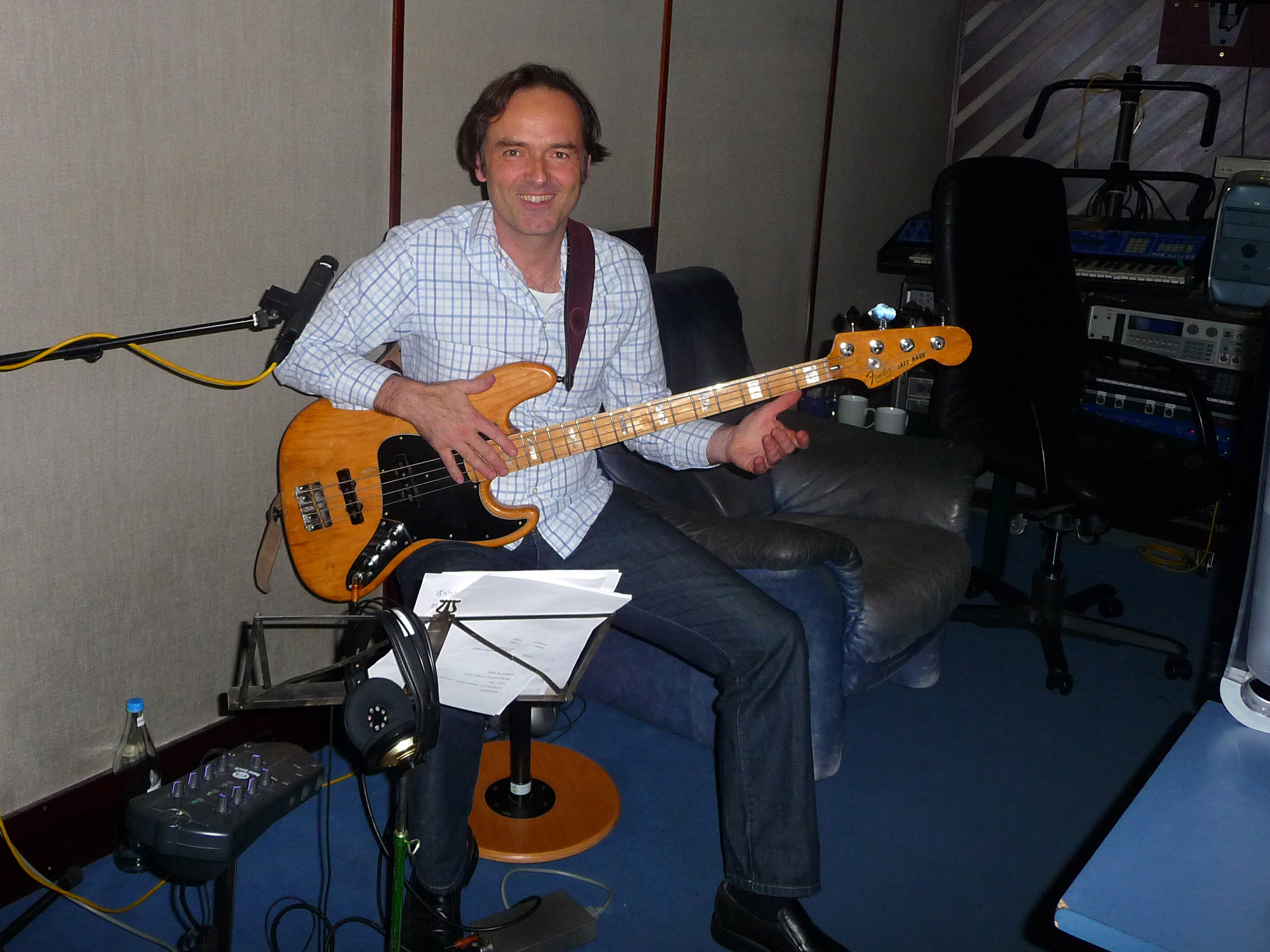
Patrick Scales recording the bass tracks for the CD Tenoration of Pee Wee Ellis November 2010

Patrick Scales (born 24 March 1965) in Garmisch-Partenkirchen, Germany is a German electric bass guitar player and teacher.

== Biography ==
Patrick Scales was born in a small town in the Bavarian Alps. As the town was a recreation area for the American army, there were many clubs with live music around. Patrick could often listen to a big variety of music. From bluegrass to rock, soul music and jazz everything was present. At the age of 12 he was taking up classical guitar lessons with his teacher Jeffrey Ashton.

For his 14th birthday he got an electric bass and because of the recommendations of his teacher Wayne Martin, half a year later he started playing gigs regularly in army clubs with musicians twice his age.

After finishing school he and his brother Martin Scales (guitar) decided to visit the U.S.A. to play music and study for a period of time.

1989 Patrick moved to Munich, where he started gigging with bands in all kinds of musical fields. He was touring with the New York blues guitar player Jonathan Kalb, the avant-garde jazz band Brother Virus (CD: Live at the Knitting Factory-New York; Enja records-1991), the Brazilian band Coisa Nostra and others.

1993 Patrick and his brother Martin recorded their debut album SCALESENDERS together with their old friend Johannes Enders.

1994 Patrick joined Klaus Doldinger´s band Passport, where he is playing since and has recorded 5 CDs with.

1996 Patrick started teaching at the Music University of Mannheim. He played bass on the CD "A new shift" of Pee Wee Ellis.

1997 the CD Scales Brothers “Our House” was released at Enja Records.

1999 Patrick began to teach at the Richard Strauss Conservatory in Munich.

2000 the CD Scales “Grounded” was released at Blue Note Records.

2004 the book "A Rhythmic Concept For Fusion / Funk" (Advance Music) by Peter O'Mara and Patrick Scales was released.

2008 Patrick became teacher at the University of Music and Performing Arts Munich.

== Musicians that Scales recorded or played concerts with ==
Scales has worked with many musicians including: Klaus Doldinger, Pee Wee Ellis, Fred Wesley, Chuck Loeb, Terri Lyne Carrington, Randy Brecker, Johnny Griffin, Benny Bailey, Bob Mintzer, Claudio Roditi, Jay Ashby, Roy Ayers, Peter O'Mara, Joo Kraus, Adrian Mears, Johannes Enders a.o.

== Discography (selected) ==
With his own band

- Scales, Grounded, Blue Note Records (2000)
- Scales Brothers, Our House, Enja (1997)
- Scalesenders, This And More, GLM (1994)

With other musicians

- Pee Wee Ellis, Tenoration, Art Of Groove - MIG-Music (2011)
- Klaus Doldinger Passport, Inner Blue, Warner Music Group (2011)
- Klaus Doldinger Passport, Symphonic Projectl, Warner Music Group (2011)
- Klaus Doldinger Passport, On Stage, Warner Music Group (2008)
- Frank Monelli, Easy Life & Love, Sonoton (2008)
- YuMAG, Live im Kongress, Marangani Records (2007)
- Joo Kraus & Basic Jazz Lounge, The Ride, Edel Records (2006)
- Klaus Doldinger Passport, Passport To Morocco, WEA (2006)
- Klaus Doldinger Passport, Back to Brazil, Warner Music Group (2003)
- Enders Room, Monolith, Enja (2002), featuring Rebekka Bakken, Wolfgang Muthspiel
- Wolfgang Haffner, Urban Life, Skip (2001)
- Dieter Reith, Manic -Organic, Mons Records (2001)
- Klaus Doldinger Passport, Move, Warner Music Group (2000)
- Tatort, Die Songs, Warner Music Group (2000), featuring Manfred Krug
- A-Strain, A-Strain, SBF Records (1998)
- Alison Welles, Expect Me, House Master Records (1997), featuring Bob Mintzer, Dave Samuels
- Zappel Bude, Mood Records (1997)
- Pee Wee Ellis, A New Shift, Minor Music (1996)
- Klaus Doldinger Passport, To Paradise, Warner Music Group (1996)
- Color Box, Forbidden Blue, BSC Music (1995), featuring Randy Brecker
- SPLASH, Just A Party, Nu Trax (1994)
- Coisa Nostra, Nao Eu Nao Sou Brasilero, JMP Records (1993)
- Brother Virus Happy Hour , Enja (1991)
- F.L.T., Wölfe Remix, da music (1988)
