= Christof Lauer =

German jazz saxophonist

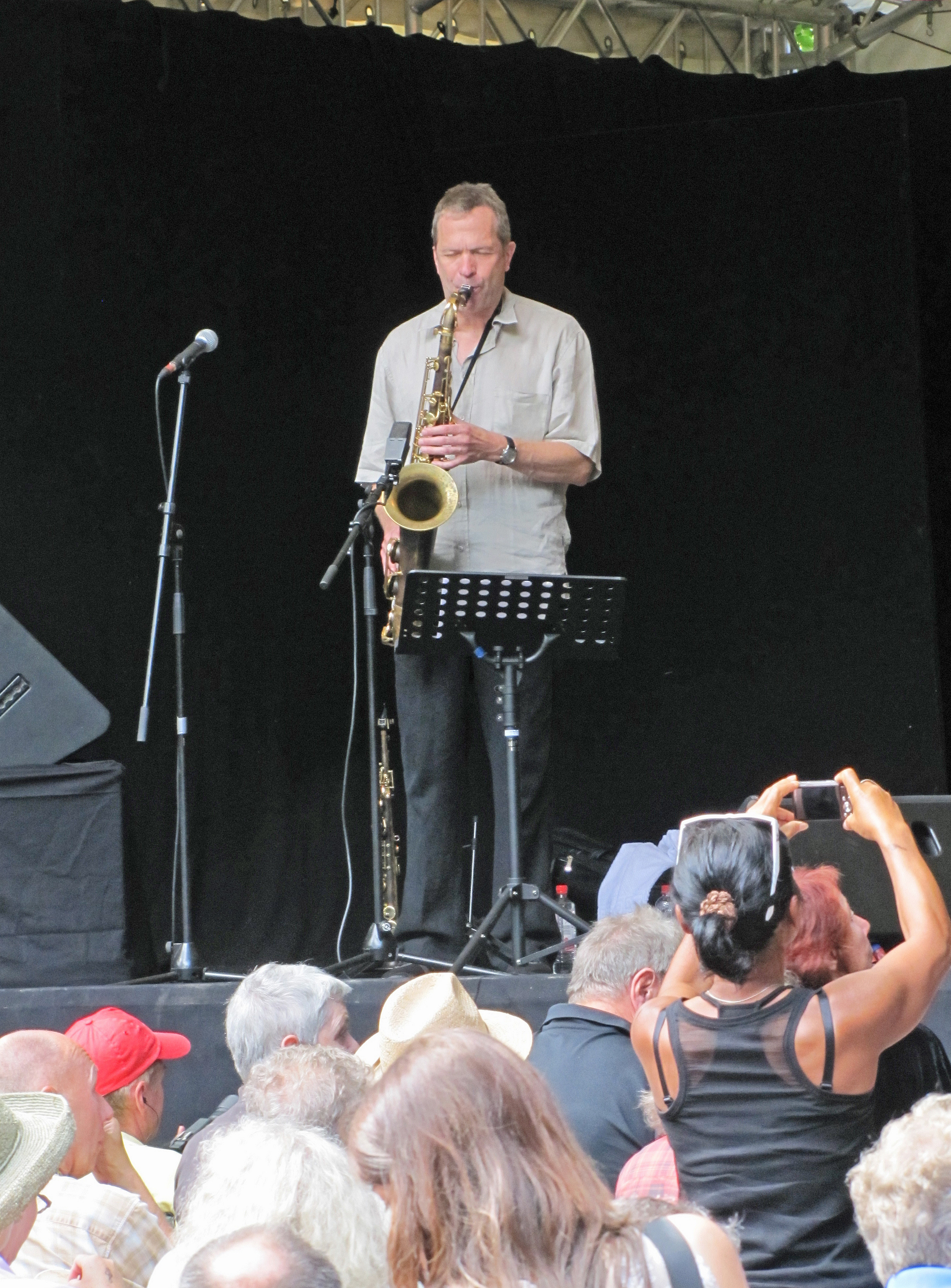

Background information
- Born: 25 May 1953 (age 72); Melsungen, Germany
- Genres: Jazz
- Occupation: Musician
- Instrument(s): Tenor and soprano saxophone
- Labels: CMP, ACT

Christof Lauer (born 25 May 1953) is a German jazz tenor and soprano saxophonist, born in Melsungen, Germany, perhaps most well known in Europe where he has done projects with various musicians, such as Palle Danielsson, Carla Bley, Anthony Cox, Michel Godard and Gary Husband, Vince Mendoza's Jazzpaña, Michel Portal, Maria João, Alphonse Mouzon, and Peter Erskine.

Since 1979 he is member of the Jazzensemble des Hessischen Rundfunks led by Albert Mangelsdorff. In 1994 Lauer joined the United Jazz and Rock Ensemble and replaced Charlie Mariano, and is also a member of the Hamburg NDR Radio Orchestra.

== Discography ==
- Perlboot (L+R Records, 1987), quartet with Ralf R. Hübner
- Christof Lauer (CMP, 1989), quartet with Joachim Kühn, Palle Danielsson and Peter Erskine
- Moabiter Blues (L+R Records, 1991), duo with Ralf R. Hübner
- Bluebells (CMP, 1992) with Wolfgang Puschnig, Bob Stewart and Thomas Alkier
- Evidence (CMP, 1995), trio featuring Anthony Cox and Daniel Humair
- Mondspinner (Free Flow Music, 1996), quartet with Ralf R. Hübner
- Fragile Network (ACT, 1999), quintet featuring Michel Godard, Marc Ducret, Anthony Cox and Gene Jackson
- Shadows in the Rain (ACT, 2001), duo with pianist Jens Thomas plus strings featuring Sidsel Endresen, tribute to Sting
- Pure Joy (ACT, 2003), duo with pianist Jens Thomas
- Heaven (ACT, 2003) with Norwegian Brass featuring Sondre Bratland, Rebekka Bakken and Geir Lysne
- Blues in Mind (ACT, 2007) with Michel Godard and Gary Husband
- Play Sidney Bechet Petite Fleur (ACT, 2014) with the NDR BigBand
