= Ack van Rooyen =

Dutch trumpeter (1930–2021)

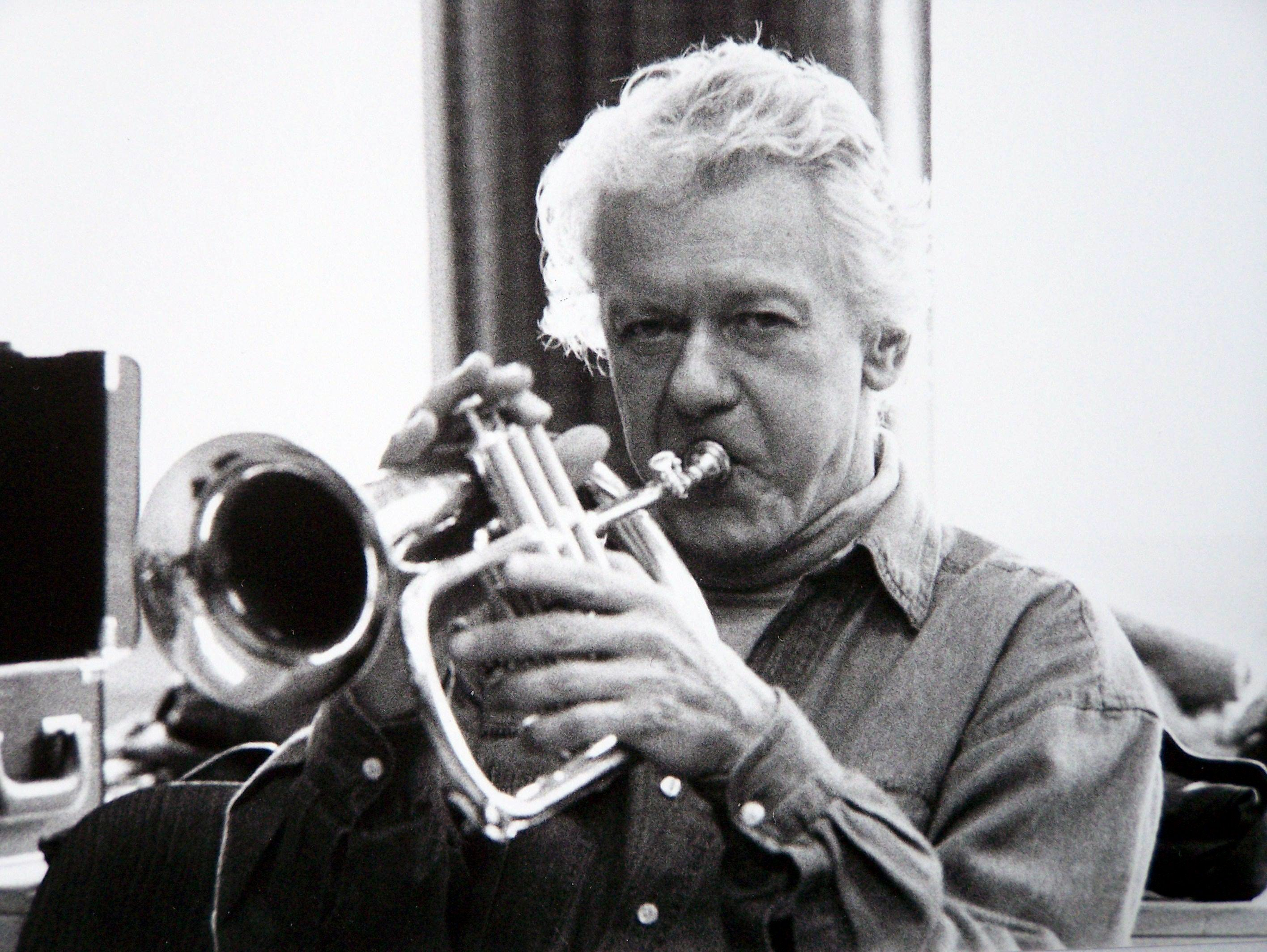
Van Rooyen in 1995

Ack van Rooyen (1 January 1930 – 18 November 2021) was a Dutch jazz trumpeter and flugelhornist. He was the brother of Jerry van Rooyen, also a trumpeter-composer.

== Biography ==
Ack van Rooyen was born in The Hague on 1 January 1930. He began playing with a military band as a teenager, touring bases in Indonesia. He then studied music at the Royal Conservatory of The Hague, graduating in 1950, then worked with Ernst van 't Hoff and his brother. He played with The Ramblers in 1955–1957, then moved to France in 1957, where he worked with Aime Barelli, Kenny Clarke, Lucky Thompson, and Barney Wilen. In 1960, he relocated to Germany, playing in a big band at Sender Freies Berlin with his brother, in addition to side work with Hans Koller, Bert Kaempfert, and Åke Persson. He settled in Stuttgart in 1967 and worked with musicians such as Volker Kriegel, Charly Antolini, Friedrich Gulda, Slide Hampton, and Eberhard Weber. He also toured widely during this time.

In 1980, he returned to the Netherlands, eventually taking a position as an educator at his alma mater, the Royal Conservatory.

He died on 18 November 2021, at the age of 91.
