= Albert Mangelsdorff =

German jazz trombonist

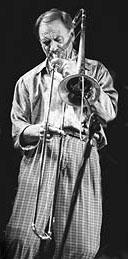
- Mangelsdorff in concert

Background information
- Born: September 5, 1928; Frankfurt am Main, Hesse-Nassau, Prussia, Germany
- Died: July 25, 2005 (aged 76) Frankfurt am Main, Hesse, Germany
- Genres: Jazz
- Occupation: Musician
- Instrument: Trombone
- Years active: 1948–2005
- Formerly of: United Jazz + Rock Ensemble

Albert Mangelsdorff (September 5, 1928 – July 25, 2005) was a German jazz trombonist. Working mainly in free jazz, he was an innovator in multiphonics.

== Early life ==
Mangelsdorff was born in Frankfurt on September 5, 1928, as the son of the bookbinder Emil Albert Joseph Mangelsdorff (1891–1963), born in Ingolstadt, and his wife Luise, née Becker (1896–1976), from Wertheim. He was given violin lessons as a child and was self-taught on guitar in addition to knowing trombone. His brother, Emil Mangelsdorff, had a jazz record collection, but during the Nazi period Albert's enthusiasm for the music had to be restrained. Mangelsdorff began his career as a professional musician in 1947 as a rhythm guitarist in the Otto Laufner Big Band, which played in US Army clubs. Mangelsdorff bought his first trombone on the black market for a few cartons of cigarettes. Then he took lessons from the principal trombonist at the Oper Frankfurt, Fritz Stähr (1889–1971).

== Later life and career ==
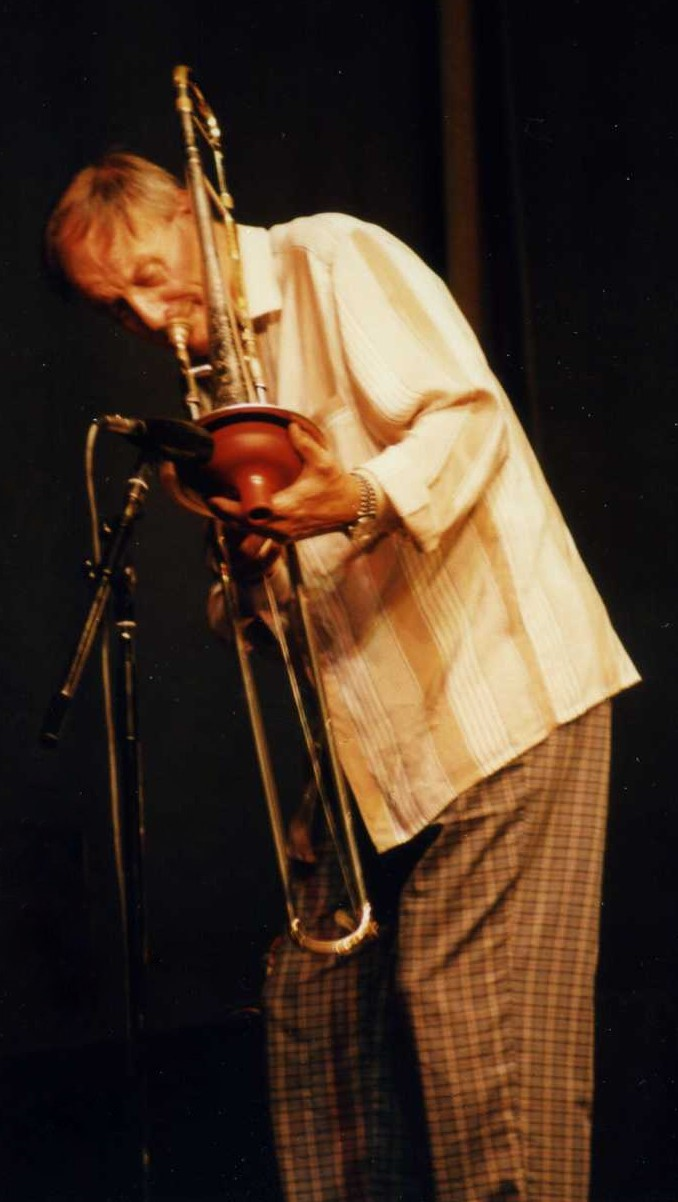
Mangelsdorff performing in 1987

He played in the bands of Joe Klimm (1950–53) and Hans Koller (1953/54) as well as in the HR Dance Orchestra conducted by Willy Berking (1955–57). Mangelsdorff made his recording debut in 1952, playing with Hans Koller. As the German representative for the Newport Jazz Festival International Band in 1958, he collaborated with the American musicians Gerry Mulligan and Louis Armstrong. From 1959, he performed in the Jazz im Palmengarten series of events.

In 1961, he founded his Albert Mangelsdorff Quintet. Mangelsdorff recorded prolifically in the 1960s, including sessions with his own quintet, his brother, and with pianist John Lewis. By the time of his solo performance at the Munich Olympic Games in 1972, he was playing more free jazz. In 1972, he recorded his first solo record Trombirds.

"He made solo trombone – a heretofore unknown concept in jazz – a reality via multiphonics, the physically and technically demanding simultaneous blowing and singing of notes into his horn; the method opened vast new dimensions like harmonies and chords".

He performed with pianist Chick Corea, cool jazz saxophonist Lee Konitz and bassist Jaco Pastorius. Mangelsdorff later worked with the NDR Big Band, Old Friends (led by Manfred Schoof), the Globe Unity Orchestra, and the United Jazz + Rock Ensemble.

In 1993, Mangelsdorff was appointed honorary professor for jazz at the Frankfurt University of Music and Performing Arts. From 1995 to 2001, he directed the Berlin Jazz Festival.

== Personal life ==
Mangelsdorff was married to Ilo. He was the father of countertenor and biologist Ralph Daniel Mangelsdorff (born 1958). Mangelsdorff was a passionate ornithologist. He died in Frankfurt am Main on July 25, 2005. He is buried at the Frankfurt Main Cemetery (Gewann XV 31).

== Legacy ==
The Albert Mangelsdorff Prize, which emerged from the German Jazz Prize in 1994, is awarded every two years by the Union of German Jazz Musicians. In 2008, the Albert Mangelsdorff Foyer was opened in the Alte Oper. In 2013, the inauguration of the Albert-Mangelsdorff-Weiher (pond) in Frankfurt, Bockenheimer Anlage, took place.

=== Estate ===
In 2009, the Institut für Stadtgeschichte Frankfurt founded a Jazzarchiv (jazz archive) with the takeover of Mangelsdorff's estate.

== Discography ==
- Tension (CBS, 1963)
- Now Jazz Ramwong (CBS, 1964)
- Animal Dance with John Lewis, Zagreb Jazz Quartet (Atlantic, 1964)
- Folk Mond and Flower Dream (CBS, 1967)
- Zo-Ko-Ma with Attila Zoller, Lee Konitz (MPS, 1968)
- Albert Mangelsdorff and His Friends (MPS, 1969)
- Open Space with Karin Krog, John Surman, Francy Boland, Niels H.O. Pedersen, Daniel Humair (MPS, 1969)
- Wild Goose with Colin Wilkie, Shirley Hart, Joki Freund (MPS, 1969)
- Never Let It End (MPS, 1970)
- Live in Tokyo (Enja, 1971)
- The End with Brotzmann, Van Hove, Bennink (FMP, 1971)
- Couscouss de la Mauresque with Brotzmann, Van Hove, Bennink (FMP, 1971)
- Elements with Brotzmann, Van Hove, Bennink (FMP, 1971)
- Spontaneous with Masahiko Sato, Peter Warren, Allen Blairman (Enja, 1972)
- Trombone Workshop with Jiggs Whigham, Slide Hampton, Ake Persson (MPS, 1972)
- Trombirds (MPS, 1973)
- Birds of Underground (MPS, 1973)
- It's Up to You with Friedrich Gulda (Preiser, 1974)
- The Wide Point with Elvin Jones, Palle Danielson (MPS, 1975)
- Outspan No. 1 with Brotzmann, Van Hove, Bennink (FMP, 1975)
- Solo Now with Pierre Favre, Joachim Kuhn, Gunter Hampel (MPS, 1976)
- Trilogue Live at the Berlin Jazz Days with Alphonse Mouzon, Jaco Pastorius (MPS, 1977)
- Tromboneliness (MPS, 1977)
- A Matter Of Taste with Mumps (John Surman, Barre Phillips, Stu Martin) (MPS, 1977)
- Solo with John Tchicai (FMP, 1977)
- Triplicity with Arild Andersen, Pierre Favre (Skip, 1979, released 2005)
- A Jazz Tune I Hope (MPS, 1979)
- Horns with Gerd Dudek, Paul Rutherford, Manfred Schoof, Kenny Wheeler (FMP, 1979)
- Trombone Summit with Winding, Watrous, Whigham (MPS, 1981)
- Live in Montreux! with J.F. Jenny-Clark, Ronald Shannon Jackson (MPS, 1981)
- Solo (MPS, 1982)
- Two Is Company with Wolfgang Dauner (Mood, 1983)
- Triple Entente (MPS, 1983)
- Reflections with Manfred Schoof, Wolfgang Dauner, Eberhard Weber (Mood, 1984)
- Pica Pica with Brotzmann, Sommer (FMP, 1984)
- Ochsenzoll with Michael Naura, Wolfgang Schlueter, Herbert Joos (Mood, 1985)
- Hot Hut (Musikant, 1986)
- Moon at Noon with Wolfgang Dauner (Musikant, 1987)
- Art of the Duo with Lee Konitz (Enja, 1988)
- Listen and Lay Back (Dino Music, 1988)
- Rooty Toot (Dino Music, 1990)
- Purity (Mood, 1990)
- Dodging Bullets with John Lindberg, Eric Watson (Black Saint, 1992)
- Room 1220 with John Surman (Konnex, 1993)
- Live: The Very Human Factor (Muffin, 1993)
- Lanaya (Plainisphare, 1994)
- The Wake Keeping with Chico Freeman (Amori, 1996)
- Live at Montreux with Reto Weber (Double Moon, 1999)
- Shake Shuttle & Blow with Bruno Spoerri, Christy Doran, Reto Weber (Enja, 1999)
- Looking Outside (Altrisuoni, 2001)
- Music for Jazz Orchestra with NDR Big Band (Skip, 2003)

== Writings ==
- "Anleitung zur Improvisation". Schott Music.

== See also ==
- Jazz in Germany
