= Thomas Heberer (musician) =

German musician and composer (1965)

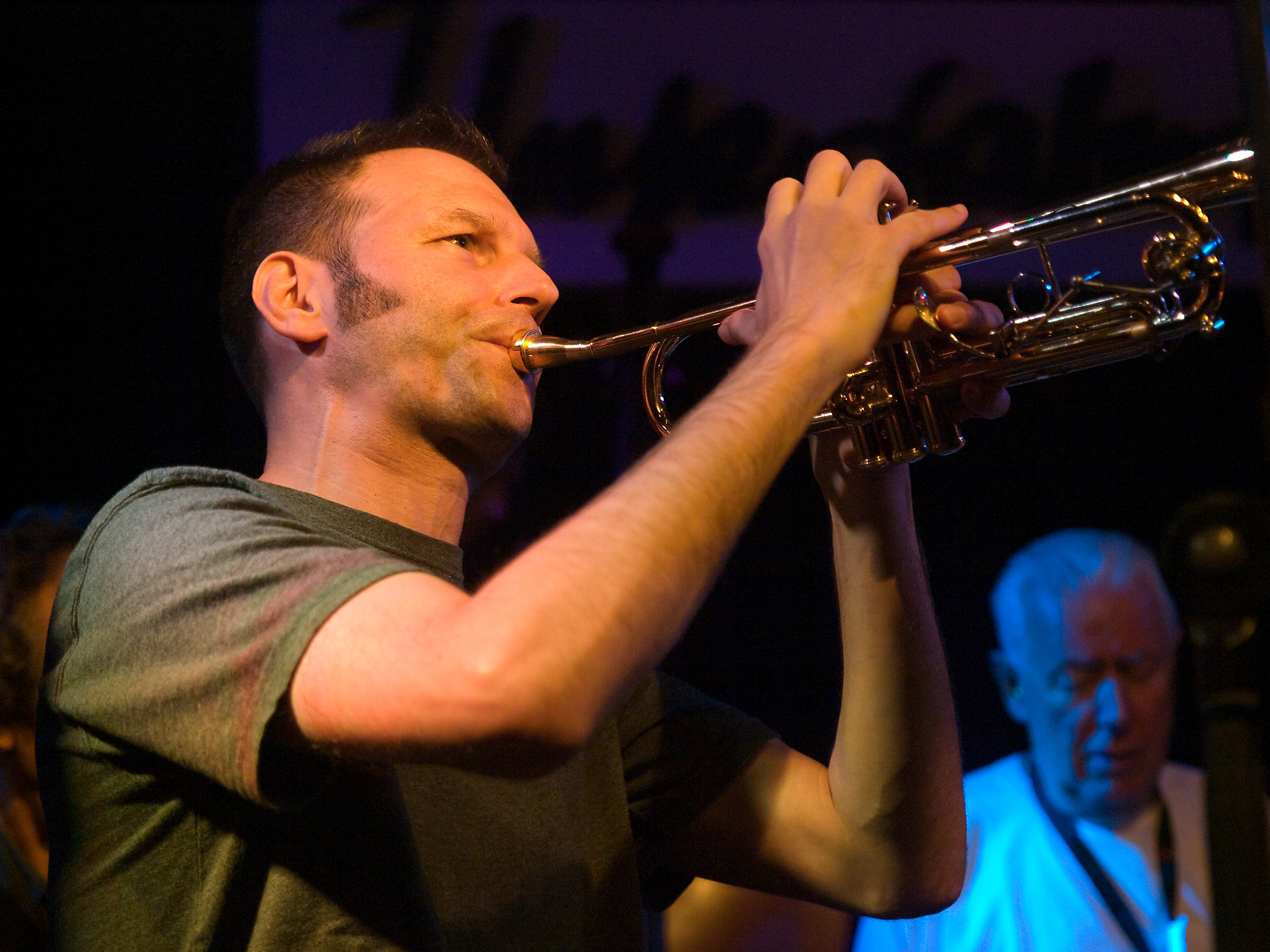
- Heberer in 2010

Background information
- Born: 24 September 1965 (age 61); Schleswig, Schleswig-Holstein, Germany
- Genres: Improvised music; jazz; chamber music
- Occupations: Musician; composer
- Instruments: Trumpet; cornet; keyboard
- Education: Cologne University of Music
- Website: www.thomasheberer.com

Thomas Heberer (born 24 September 1965, in Schleswig, Germany) is a German trumpeter, quarter-tone trumpeter, cornetist, keyboardist and composer, primarily focused on creative improvised music, jazz, and contemporary chamber music. Based in New York City, he currently works as a leader and sideman in a variety of bands in Europe and the US.

== Early life and education ==
Heberer began playing trumpet at the age of 11. From 1984 to 1987, he studied at the Cologne University of Music with Manfred Schoof.

== Notable projects ==
=== As leader ===
Heberer leads several projects, including past and present:

- Lip Lab, a trio with Carl Ludwig Hübsch on tuba and Christian Thomé on drums. The group released Lex Luna on JazzHausMusik in 2007.
- Clarino, a trio with clarinetist Joachim Badenhorst and bassist Pascal Niggenkemper, released two albums: Klippe in 2011 (Clean Feed) and 2012's Cookbook (Red Toucan). Pivotal to developing Heberer's own notation code, detailed in "Concepts" below.
- Garden, a trio with bassist Max Johnson and drummer Lou Grassi, recorded Push Play in 2013, which was released on CIMP in 2022.
- X Marks the Spot, a quartet with guitarist Terrence McManus, bassist Michael Bates, and drummer Jeff Davis, debuted with an eponymous album in 2019 on OutNow Recordings.
- A quartet, featuring saxophonist Ingrid Laubrock, bassist John Hébert, and drummer Michael Sarin. Their debut album The Day That Is was released by Sunnyside Records in 2021. It received four stars in DownBeat and five stars in the German magazine Jazzthetik, where Hans-Jürgen Schaal called it "Ein Album für Gegenwart, Zukunft und Ewigkeit" ("an album for the present, future and forever").

=== Solo work ===
He has recorded and performed solo. Notable recordings include The Heroic Millipede in 1988 (ITM); "Kill Yr Darlins" in 1997 (Poise); two albums on the Poise label under the pseudonym T.O.M.: Stella in 2001 and Mouth in 2003; and a vinyl-only release called One on NoBusiness Records in 2011. The Other Side of the Spoon, released on Bandcamp in 2023, is a set of solo trumpet improvisations, dedicated to the memory of Tristan Honsinger, one of Heberer' longtime musical partners in the ICP Orchestra.

His solo work has been used for films and dance performances, including for two choreographies by Pina Bausch. Choreographer Bausch's Für die Kinder von gestern, heute and morgen (2002) uses a track from Stella called "German Measles"; Bausch's Ten Chi (2004), uses a track called "Blue" from the album Mouth.

Wim Wenders used "Blue" in Pina, which was nominated for an Academy Award in 2011 for Best Documentary Feature.

"Blue" and "German Measles" were both used in Pina Bausch, a documentary directed by Anne Linsel (WDR/Arte) in 2006 and re-released by the Goethe-Institut in 2012 (IN2998).

=== ICP Orchestra and other ensembles ===
He has been a member of the ICP Orchestra from 1993 to present. Founded by Misha Mengelberg, Han Bennink and Willem Breuker, ICP currently comprises Ab Baars, Han Bennink, Joost Buis, Tobias Delius, Ernst Glerum, Guus Janssen, Michael Moore, and Mary Oliver.

During Heberer's involvement, the band has recorded numerous albums for hatOLOGY and ICP, and performed extensively around the world, including tours in Argentina, Australia, Brazil, Canada, China, Colombia, Europe, Japan and the US. Notable US performances with ICP include the Library of Congress, Harvard University, and the Great American Music Hall in San Francisco.

From 1987 to 2000, Heberer was a member of Alexander von Schlippenbach's Berlin Contemporary Jazz Orchestra, which at the time included Evan Parker, Kenny Wheeler, Aki Takase, Paul Lovens and others. During his involvement, the Orchestra recorded three albums for ECM, FMP and DIW, and performed in Europe and Japan.

Heberer was a member of Tome XX with saxophonist Dirk Raulf, bassist Tim Wells (1987-1989), bassist, Dieter Manderscheid (1990-1996), and drummer Fritz Wittek. From 1987 to 1996, the band recorded four albums under the JazzHausMusik label, touring across Europe, Africa and South America.

From 1988 to 1996, Heberer was a member of the European Jazz Ensemble, along with Joachim Kühn, Gerd Dudek, Konrad Bauer, Charlie Mariano, Tony Levin and others. In addition to performing across Europe, he is included on two recordings from the time: Meets the Khan Family (MA Music) and 20th Anniversary Tour (Konnex).

Heberer received significant attention in 1990 with his release of the album Chicago Breakdown: The Music of Jelly Roll Morton, recorded with bassist Dieter Manderscheid. The Penguin Guide to Jazz gave Chicago Breakdown four stars, the publication's highest rating, citing it "highly recommended." Heberer and Manderscheid went on to record two more duo albums: What a Wonderful World (2002), in recognition for the centenary of Louis Armstrong, and Wanderlust (2007), a reflection on American blues music. What a Wonderful World was critically acclaimed and received four out of five stars in Down Beat. As a duo, Heberer and Manderscheid have performed across Europe, Asia and the US.

From 2008 to 2013, Heberer joined drummer Joe Hertenstein's band HNH with bassist Pascal Niggenkemper. The band released two records on Clean Feed: HNH (black album) and HNH (white album). With the addition of clarinetist Joachim Badenhorst, the band made an album called Polylemma on Red Toucan Records, released in 2011. That year, Polylemma won the Happy New Ears award from the Free Jazz Collective. With Pascal Niggenkemper, Thomas released Miners Pick on the British FMR label (2014), a duet album, exclusively focusing on his cornet playing.

In 2013, Heberer and longtime collaborator Achim Kaufmann released their first recording on Red Toucan called Knoten, followed by a second recording with Ken Filiano joining Kaufmann and Heberer, called Interstices on NuScope Recordings in 2015.

In 2014, Heberer replaced the late Roy Campbell in the Nu Band, which then comprised Heberer with Lou Grassi, Joe Fonda, and Mark Whitecage. Upon the death of Whitecage in 2021, the group was joined by Kenny Wessel. They toured Europe in 2014, 2016, 2017, 2019, 2023, and 2025. Four recordings were issued on Not Two Records: The Cosmological Constant (2015), Live in Geneva (2017), In Memory of Mark Whitecage (2021), and Renual (2022).

In 2016, Thomas became a founding member of the Angelica Sanchez Nonet. In addition to the leader, the ensemble includes Michaël Attias, Ben Goldberg, John Hébert, Sam Ospovat, Chris Speed, Omar Tamez, and Kenny Warren. The nonet's debut, Nighttime Creatures, was released on Pyroclastic Records in 2023, and ranked among the Best Albums of the Year in Downbeat.

In 2020, Heberer, bassist Joe Fonda and drummer Joe Hertenstein formed the group REMEDY. The trio toured Europe in 2024 and has released four albums on the Fundacja Słuchaj! label: REMEDY (2021), Vol. 2 (2023), Hipp Hipp Hooray–Celebrating the Centennial of Jutta Hipp (2025), REMEDY + Aki Takase (2025). Their debut and Vol. 2 were both voted among the Albums of the Year by the New York City Jazz Record. A recording from a performance in Germany, called Live at Jazzkammer, was released in 2024 on Bandcamp.

=== Sideman ===
He participates as a sideman in numerous ensembles and recordings with leaders such as Muhal Richard Abrams, Karl Berger, Peter Brötzmann, Han Bennink, Eugene Chadbourne, Dave Douglas, Joe Fonda, Frank Gratkowski, Barry Guy, Christoph Haberer, Gabriele Hasler, Guus Janssen, Maria João, Paul van Kemenade, Yoni Kretzmer, Misha Mengelberg, Butch Morris, Bob Moses, Alphonse Mouzon, David Murray, Sunny Murray, Michael Riessler, Alexander von Schlippenbach, Andreas Schmidt, Frank Schulte, Elliott Sharp, Norbert Stein, Steve Swell, Aki Takase, Attila Zoller, John Zorn.

== With Harald Schmidt ==
He served as a member of the regular band supporting German talk show host and entertainer Harald Schmidt from 1995 to 2007. He was also featured as a guest several times including for the Miles Davis episode on November 22, 2002.

From 1995 to 2003, the show aired four times a week for the German SAT1 private television channel. From 2005 to 2007, the show was performed two times per week for ARD, Germany's national television channel.

== Critical reception ==
Die Zeit critic Konrad Heidkamp called him "the master of German trumpet", The Penguin Guide to Jazz said he was "outstandingly gifted", the Rowohlt Jazz Lexikon credits him with having "developed a unique trumpet style", and pianist Alexander von Schlippenbach named him "our new trumpet genius".

== Teaching ==
From 1993 to 1997, Heberer lectured at the music conservatory Hochschule für Musik und Darstellende Kunst in Frankfurt, Germany.

He has conducted numerous workshops with the ICP Orchestra (among others, the 2007 Banff International Workshop in Jazz and Creative Music in Alberta, Canada), as well as for the Goethe-Institut in South America, Asia and Africa.

He compiled a summary on trumpet techniques called "Trumpet Mechanics".

Other teaching positions include the jazz workshop at Akademie Remscheid in Germany and the Maine Jazz Camp at the University of Maine in Farmington.

== Concepts ==
In addition to using regular staff paper for his compositions, Heberer has developed a notation code that he calls "Cookbook." It is an instant composition method, which allows for a high amount of freedom on the musicians' side while allowing significant structural tools on the composer's side as well. It does so by implementing the idea of instant memory shaped according to a specific set of rules.

== Awards and recognition ==
- SWR-Jazzpreis, 1990
- Preis der Deutschen Schallplattenkritik, Vierteljahresliste, 1990, for "Chicago Breakdown: The Music of Jelly Roll Morton" with Dieter Manderscheid
- Jazz-Art Preis in 2002, for "What a Wonderful World" with Dieter Manderscheid
- Winner of DownBeat Critics TDWR Poll Award in 2002, for Instant Composers Pool (ICP) Orchestra
- Preis der Deutschen Schallplattenkritik, Jahrespreis 2004, for the Aki Takase Band "Plays Fats Waller"
- Finalist in DownBeat 58th Annual Critics Poll 2010, for Instant Composers Pool (ICP) Orchestra
- Winner of the Happy New Ears award 2011 for Polylemma, an album by the Joe Hertenstein Quartet on Red Toucan

== Select discography ==
Ensemble/Artist	Title	Year	Label
Norbert Stein	Die Fünf Tage	1987	JazzHausMusik (JHM 31)
Thomas Heberer	The Heroic Millipede	1988	ITM Records (ITM 1443)
Tome XX	Natura Morta	1988	JazzHausMusik (JHM 32)
Berlin Contemporary Jazz Orchestra	Berlin Contemporary Jazz Orchestra	1989	ECM (ECM 1409)
Thomas Heberer, Dieter Manderscheid	Chicago Breakdown: The Music of Jelly Roll Morton	1990	JazzHausMusik (JHM 38)
Norbert Stein	Die Wilden Pferde Der Armen Leute	1990	JazzHausMusik (JHM 39)
Tome XX	The Red Snapper	1991	JazzHausMusik (JHM 47)
European Jazz Ensemble	Meets the Kahn Family	1992	MA Music (A 807-2)
Sotto in Su	Südamerika Sept. 90	1992	JazzHausMusik (JHM 51)
David Murray	Baltic Suite	1993	GOWI (CDG 05)
Berlin Contemporary Jazz Orchestra	The Morlocks and Other Pieces	1994	FMP (FMP 61)
Tome XX	Third Degree	1994	JazzHausMusik (JHM 63)
Christoph Haberer	Pulsation	1994	JazzHausMusik (JHM 66)
European Trumpet Summit	European Trumpet Summit	1994	Konnex (KCD 5064)
Frank Schulte	Switchbox	1994	No Man's Land (NML 9421)
Jazzensemble des Hessischen Rundfunks	Atmospheric Conditions Permitting	1995	ECM (ECM 1549)
Gabriele Hasler	Rosenstücke	1996	Foolish Music (211 096)
Berlin Contemporary Jazz Orchestra	Live in Japan '96	1996	DIW Records (DIW-922)
Sotto in Su featuring Sussan Deyhim	Vanitas	1997	Poise (Poise 4)
Thomas Heberer	Kill Yr Darlins	1997	Poise (Poise 5)
European Jazz Ensemble	20th Anniversary Tour	1997	Konnex (KCD 5078)
Misha Mengelberg	The Root of the Problem	1997	hatOLOGY (hatOLOGY 504)
Michael Riessler	Honig und Asche	1998	ENJA (ENJ-9303)
ICP Orchestra	Jubilee Varia	1999, 2010	hatOLOGY (hatOLOGY 528, 667)
Thomas Heberer's T.O.M.	Stella	2001	Poise (Poise 8)
ICP Orchestra	Oh, My Dog!	2001	ICP (ICP 040)
Thomas Heberer, Dieter Manderscheid	What a Wonderful World	2002	JazzHausMusik (JHM 118)
Thomas Heberer's T.O.M.	Mouth	2003	Poise (Poise 9)
ICP Orchestra	Aan & Uit	2004	ICP (ICP 042)
Aki Takase	Plays Fats Waller	2004	ENJA (ENJA 9152-2)
Norbert Scholly, Frank Schulte, Thomas Heberer	SSH Plays Shhh	2005	Konnex (KCD 5134)
Norbert Stein	Code Carnival	2005	Pata Music (Pata 17)
ICP Orchestra	Weer Is een Dag Voorbij	2006	ICP (ICP 043)
Thomas Heberer, Dieter Manderscheid	Wanderlust	2006	JazzHausMusik (JHM 151)
Thomas Heberer's Lip Lab	Lex Luna	2007	JazzHausMusik (JHM 162)
James Choice Orchestra	Live at Moers	2007	Moers Music (03020)
ICP Orchestra	Live at the Bimhuis	2008	ICP (ICP 046)
Andreas Schmidt, Samuel Rohrer, Thomas Heberer	Pieces for a Husky Puzzle	2009	JazzWerkstatt (JW 075)
Joe Hertenstein, Pascal Niggenkemper, Thomas Heberer	HNH	2010	Clean Feed (CF205)
ICP Orchestra	Orchestra	2010	ICP (ICP 049)
ICP Orchestra	!ICP! 50	2010	ICP (ICP 50)
Thomas Heberer's Clarino	Klippe	2011	Clean Feed (CF226)
Thomas Heberer	Klippe/One	2011	NoBusiness Records (NBLP32/33)
Joe Hertenstein Quartet	Polylemma	2011	Red Toucan (RT 9342)
Peter Brötzmann's Full Blast and Friends	Sketches and Ballads	2011	Trost (TR107)
Getatchew Mekuria & the Ex & Friends	Y'Anbessaw Tezeta	2012	Terp Records (AS 21/22)
Thomas Heberer's Clarino	Cookbook	2012	Red Toucan (RT 9345)
ICP Orchestra	ICP Complete Boxed Catalogue	2012	Challenge Records (Buzz 1275)
Thomas Heberer, Achim Kaufmann	Knoten	2013	Red Toucan (RT 9347)
Aki Takase	Plays Fats Waller in Berlin	2013	Jazzwerkstatt (JW 029)
Datenverarbeiter	Fleur Noire Joue Les Images	2014	Fuego (2274-2)
Thomas Heberer, Pascal Niggenkemper	Miner's Pick	2014	FMR (FMR 383-0714)
ICP Orchestra	East of the Sun	2014	ICP (ICP 051)
Thomas Heberer, Achim Kaufmann, Ken Filiano	Interstices	2015	NuScope Recordings (CD 1029)
The Nu Band	The Cosmological Constant	2015	Not Two (MW 923-2)
ICP Orchestra	Live at the Vortex London	2015	ICP (ICP 053)
Joe Hertenstein, Pascal Niggenkemper, Thomas Heberer	HNH 2	2015	Clean Feed (CF332)
ICP Orchestra	Restless in Pieces	2016	ICP (ICP 054)
Yoni Kretzmer Five	Five	2016	OutNow Recordings (ONR 026)
The Nu Band	Live in Geneva	2017	Not Two (MW 948-2)
Thomas Heberer, Yoni Kretzmer, Christian Weber	BIG	2018	OutNow Recordings (ONR 031)
Thomas Heberer	X Marks the Spot	2019	OutNow Recordings (ONR 037)
ICP Orchestra & Nieuw Amsterdams Peil	De Hondemepper	2020	ICP (ICP 062)
Enrique Haneine	Unaltered	2020	Elegant Walk Records (003)
REMEDY (Thomas Heberer, Joe Fonda, Joe Hertenstein)	REMEDY	2021	Fundacja Słuchaj! (FSR 08 2021)
Thomas Heberer	The Day That Is	2021	Sunnyside Records (SSC 1638)
The Nu Band	In Memory of Mark Whitecage	2021	Not Two Records (MW 1019-2)
ICP Orchestra	30 Year Jubileum—Day 1, 2, 3	2022	Bandcamp (ICP205-1, ICP205-2, ICP205-3)
Thomas Heberer’s Garden	Push Play	2022	CIMP (423)
The Nu Band	Renual	2022	Not Two Records (MW 1028-2)
Thomas Heberer, Ken Filiano, Phil Haynes	Spontaneous Composition	2022	CornerStoreJazz (CSJ-0129)
Thomas Heberer & Christof Knoche	The In Side	2023	Bandcamp (420 CPW 01)
Thomas Heberer	The Other Side of the Spoon	2023	Bandcamp (420 CPW 02)
REMEDY (Thomas Heberer, Joe Fonda, Joe Hertenstein)	Vol. 2	2023	Fundacja Słuchaj! (FSR 12 2023)
Steve Swell & Thomas Heberer	12 Paradoxes	2023	Bandcamp (420 CPW 03)
The Angelica Sanchez Nonet	Nighttime Creatures	2023	Pyroclastic Records (PR30)
REMEDY (Thomas Heberer, Joe Fonda, Joe Hertenstein)	Live at Jazzkammer	2024	Bandcamp (420 CPW 05)
Yoni Kretzmer & Juan Pablo Carletti’s BIGGISH	Live at Scholes Street Studio	2024	Bandcamp (gaucimusic)
REMEDY (Thomas Heberer, Joe Fonda, Joe Hertenstein)	Hipp Hipp Hooray–Celebrating the Centennial of Jutta Hipp	2025	Fundacja Słuchaj! (FSR 02 2025)
Joe Fonda & Thomas Heberer	West of the Moon	2025	Bandcamp (420 CPW 06)
ICP Orchestra	Happy Birthday -> Naar Zee Z.O.Z.	2025	Bandcamp (ICP213)
Enrique Haneine	Conceivable Directions	2025	Elegant Walk Records (004)
REMEDY (Thomas Heberer, Joe Fonda, Joe Hertenstein)	REMEDY + Aki Takase	2025	Fundacja Słuchaj! (FSR 26 2025)

== Select filmography ==
Ensemble/Artist	Title	Director	Year	Producer/Distributor
New Jazz Meeting	New Jazz Meeting 89	H. Werner Wunderlich	1989	SWF
Tome XX	D.C.	Reiner Michalke	1992	RTL
Aki Takase	Plays Fats Waller	Stephane Jourdain	2005	La Huit
Pina Bausch	Pina Bausch	Anne Linsel	2006	WDR/Arte
ICP Orchestra	ICP Orchestra	Guy Girard	2006	La Huit
Misha Mengelberg	Afijn	Jellie Dekker	2006	Data Images/ICP
Eugene Chadbourne	The Jack & Jim Show	Robert O'Haire	2007	Modern Alchemy
The Ex	Convoy Tour: 25 Years of the Ex	The Ex	2009	EX Records
Han Bennink	Hazentijd	Jellie Dekker	2010	Data Images/ICP
ICP Orchestra	Steigerpijp	Barbara Hin, Martin van der Veen	2010	Sushi Film
Pina Bausch	Pina	Wim Wenders	2011	Neue Road Movies
ICP Orchestra	Misha enzovoort	Cherry Duyns	2013	ICP
Fleur noire	Dix-Neuf	Werner Kiera	2015	Datenverarbeiter
Lance Gries Dancers + Thomas Heberer	Vision Festival No. 20	Lance Gries	2015	Arts for Arts
Thomas Heberer	Catch You on the Flip Side	Thomas Heberer	2016	420 CPW
Thomas Heberer	Peel	Thomas Heberer	2016	420 CPW
Thomas Heberer, Christof Knoche	Sequoia	Thomas Heberer	2016	420 CPW
Robert Dick, Thomas Heberer, Ken Filiano, Lukas Ligeti	Live at the Stone NYC	Don Mount	2022	Don Mount
Dr. Jazz Talks	Thomas Heberer Interview	Samo Šalamon	2023	Samo Šalamon
REMEDY	Live in Rochester	Dan Gross	2025	Bop Shop Records
