= Carlos Bica =

Portuguese jazz bassist

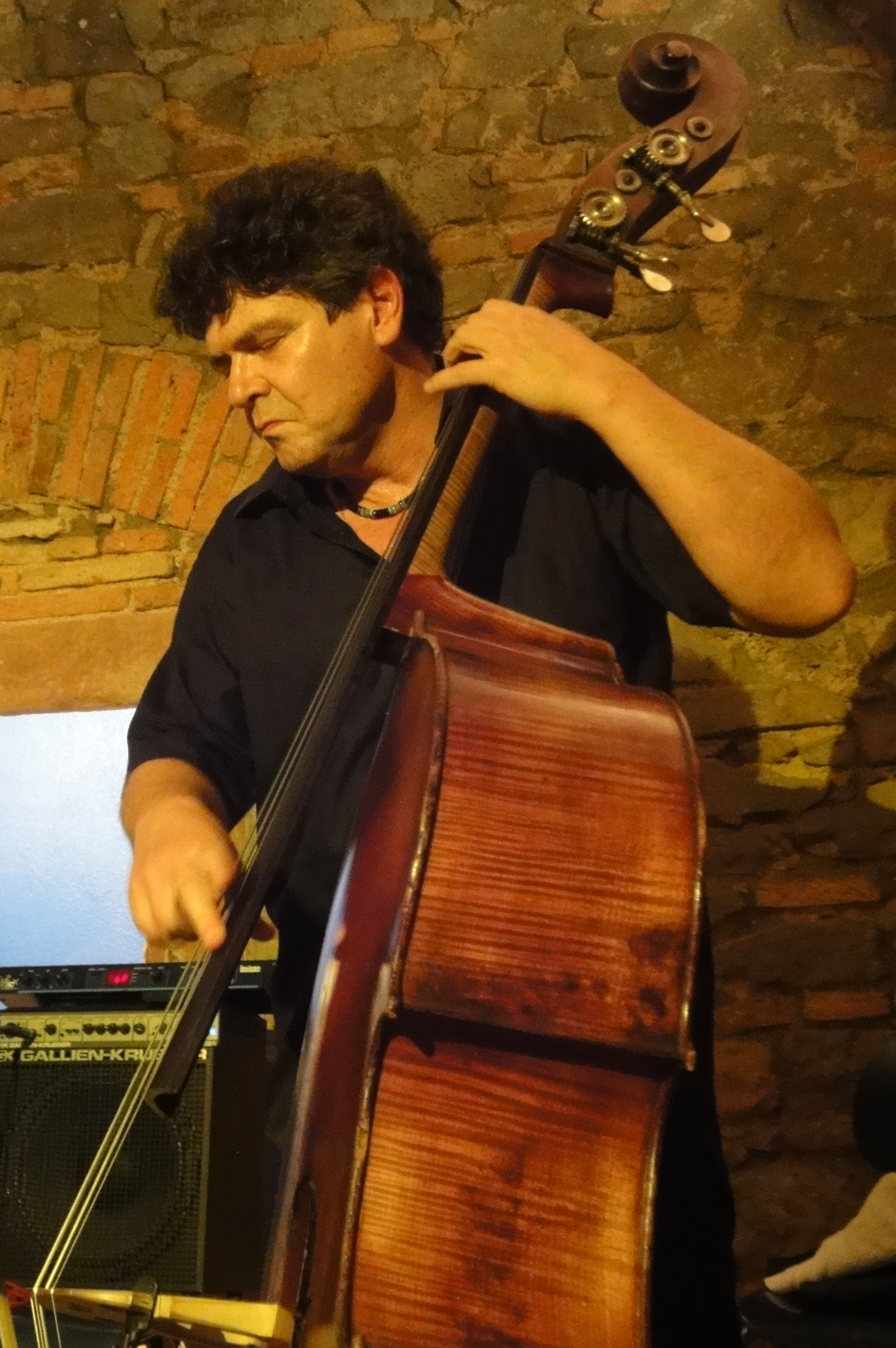

Background information
- Born: Lisbon, Portugal
- Genres: Jazz
- Occupation: Musician
- Instrument: Double bass
- Years active: 1985–present
- Website: carlosbica.com

Carlos Bica is a Portuguese jazz bassist.

== Career ==
Bica studied at the Academia dos Amadores de Musica in Lisbon and the Hochschule für Musik in Würzburg. He was "Musician of the Year" in Portugal in 1998 and in 2016. For his album Matéria-Prima released in 2010, the Carlos Paredes Prize 2011 was awarded to Carlos Bica. His trio AZUL with Frank Möbus and Jim Black become his showcase as a bass player and composer. For more than twenty years Carlos Bica’s AZUL has fascinated its listeners. He has played at important jazz festivals across Europe, Canada and Asia.

He has composed for theater, dance, and film. He worked for many years with Portuguese vocalist Maria João. He has also worked with Portuguese Fado singers Carlos do Carmo, Camané, Cristina Branco, Ana Moura, José Mário Branco, and jazz musicians Ray Anderson, Kenny Wheeler, Aki Takase, Paolo Fresu, Julian Argüelles, Gebhard Ullmann, Lee Konitz, Mário Laginha, Markus Stockhausen, Alexander von Schlippenbach, Kurt Rosenwinkel, and John Zorn.

== Discography ==
=== As leader ===
- Azul (EmArcy, 1996)
- Twist (Enja, 1998)
- Diz (Enja, 2001)
- Look What They've Done to My Song (Enja, 2003)
- Single (Bor Land, 2005)
- A Chama Do Sol (Nabel, 2006)
- Believer (Enja, 2006)
- Carlos Bica + Materia-Prima (Clean Feed, 2010)
- Things About (Clean Feed, 2011)
- More Than This (Clean Feed, 2017)
- Azul in Ljubljana (Clean Feed, 2018)
- I Am the Escaped One (Clean Feed, 2019)
- Playing with Beethoven (Clean Feed, 2023)
- 11:11 (Clean Feed, 2024)

=== As sideman ===
With Camane

- Na Linha Da Vida (EMI, 1998)
- Esta Coisa Da Alma ((EMI, 2000)
- Pelo Dia Dentro (EMI, 2001)
- Sempre De Mim (EMI, 2008)
- Ao Vivo No Coliseu (EMI, 2009)
- Do Amor E Dos Dias (EMI, 2010)

With others

- Pedro Caldeira Cabral, Pedro Caldeira Cabral (EMI, 1985)
- Maria João Quinteto, Conversa (Nabel Records, 1986)
- Marta Dias, Aqui (Farol Musica, 1999)
- Ulrike Haage, Die Stille Hinter Den Worten (Sans Soleil, 2008)
- Maria Joao, Conversa (Nabel, 1986)
- Maria Joao, Sol (Enja, 1991)
- Amelia Muge, Taco a Taco (Mercury, 1998)
- Paul Brody, Klezmer Stories (Laika, 2000)
- Paul Brody, The South Klezmer Suite (Laika, 2003)
- Jorge Palma, Norte (EMI/Virgin, 2004)
- Sam the Kid, Pratica(mente) (Edel, 2006)
- Gebhard Ullmann, Essencia (Between the Lines/EFA, 2001)
