= Andreas Schmidt (jazz pianist) =

German pianist, composer and arranger (born 1967)

- Born: March 21, 1967; Berlin, Germany
- Genres: Jazz, free jazz, avant-garde jazz, Cool jazz, Post-bop
- Occupations: Pianist; Composer; Arranger
- Instruments: Piano, Saxophone
- Years active: 1990s–present
- Website: www.zerozero.de

Andreas Schmidt (born 21 March 1967) is a German pianist, composer and arranger.

== Early life and education ==
Andreas Schmidt was born in Berlin. He took piano lessons beginning at since age 13 and later also studied saxophone. His piano teachers Aki Takase (Japan) and Walter Norris (United States) encouraged him to study jazz piano, composing and arranging. From 1993 to 1998 Schmidt studied in the jazz department of the Berlin University of the Arts.

== Career ==
In 1994 Schmidt met saxophonist Lee Konitz. The pair recorded a CD together entitled Haiku, along with drummer Jerry Granelli, bass clarinetist Rudi Mahall and vocalist Sayumi Yoshida, for which Schmidt composed all the music.

In 1995 Andreas Schmidt received a composition grant from the Berlin Senate and spent six months in New York City working with Jim Black, Jane Ira Bloom, D. D. Jackson, Susie Ibarra and Joe Fiedler. There he also met pianist Paul Bley, who motivated him to work with bassist Gary Peacock. From this project emerged the CD, berlin, 1999.

Since 1997 Schmidt has been the house pianist of the Berlin jazz club A-Trane, playing with many notable musicians.

Schmidt has contributed either compositions or playing to about 30 albums. In 2007 his third album was released, entitled "hommage à tristano". It was followed in early 2008 by "Andreas Schmidt & David Liebman & Friends in Berlin".

In 2009, Schmidt released two albums: Schmidt Happens!, a live recording with Berlin musicians [ndreas Henze (bass), Kai Bussenius (drums) and saxophonist Peter Weniger, and a trio recording with drummer Samuel Rohrer and trumpeter Thomas Heberer entitled Pieces for a Husky Puzzle. In early 2010 the trio played concerts at clubs in both Berlin and New York.

In 2013 he played on the album Yingying as part of the Birgitta Flick Quartet. The quartet also recorded an album Dalarna in 2016.

Schmidt is currently teacher at UDK in Berlin.

== Discography ==
- 1995: Haiku (with Lee Konitz) (as Pianist, Composer and Producer)
- 1996: just a moment (as Pianist and Composer)
- 1999: Neothis und Neothat (as Pianist and Composer)
- 1999: berlin, 1999 (with Gary Peacock) (as Pianist, Composer and Producer)
- 2000: Kannenberg on Purpose (als Pianist and Arranger)
- 2002: A Sigh, A Song (as Pianist and Arranger)
- 2003: M. Schiefel: Gay (as Pianist)
- 2004: Jazz & Blues Award Berlin 2004
- 2006: Y MOVE
- 2007: hommage á tristano
- 2008: Andreas Schmidt & David Liebman & Friends in Berlin
- 2009: Schmidt Happens! (Andreas Schmidt Quartet with Peter Weniger)
- 2009: Pieces for a Husky Puzzle (Trio with Thomas Heberer)
- 2010: slow motion emotion (Solo CD, as Pianist and Composer)

== Awards ==
- Jazz-Performance-Preis der Karl-Hofer-Gesellschaft 2003
- Jazz & Blues Award
- Hip Hop
