= Gary Wiggins (musician) =

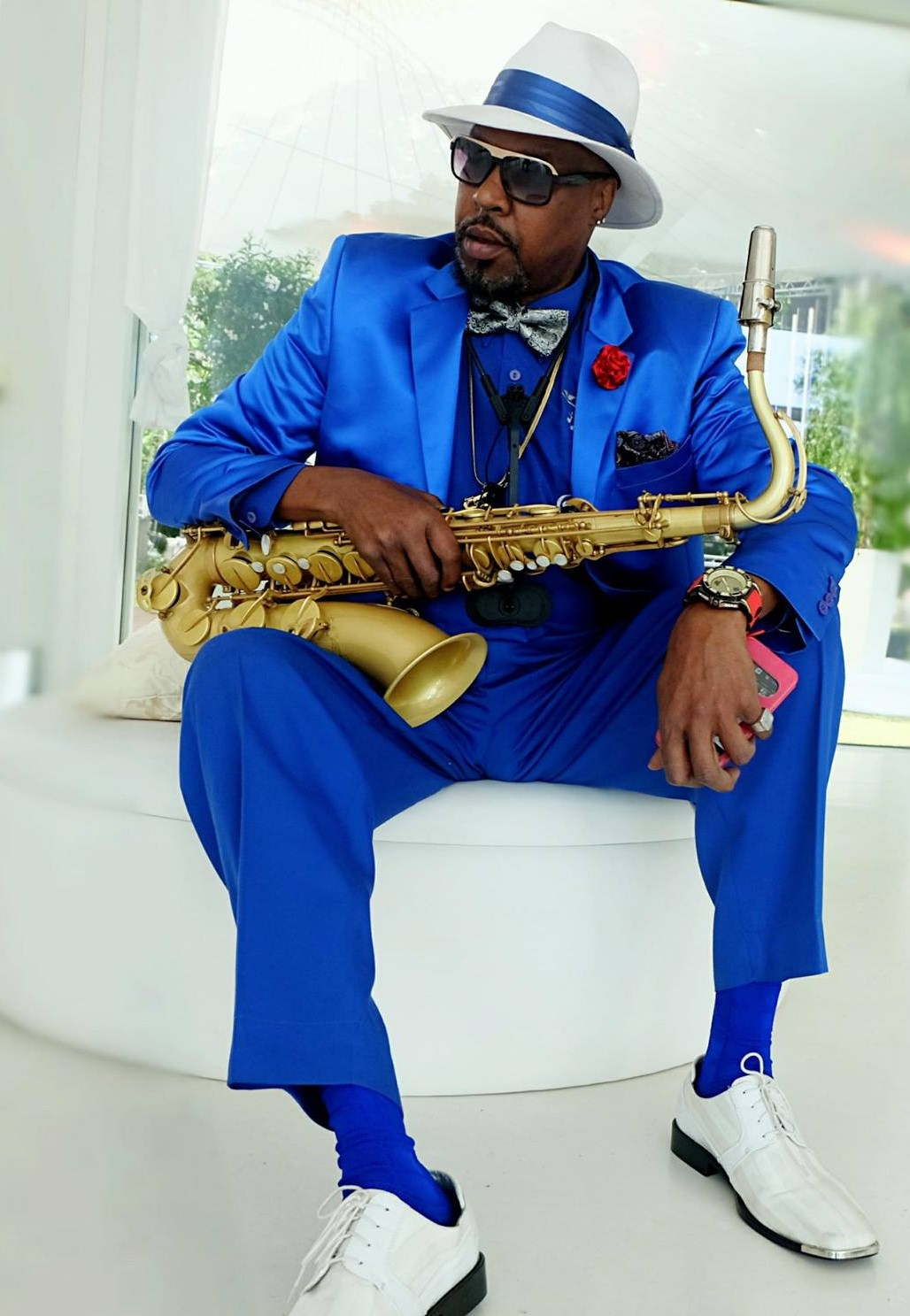

Background information
- Also known as: Detroit Gary Wiggins
- Born: Gary Allen Wiggins; November 10, 1952; Inkster, Michigan, United States
- Origin: Detroit, Michigan, United States
- Died: November 22, 2020 (aged 68) Bissingen an der Teck, South Germany
- Genres: Jazz, Blues, Soul, Chicago Blues, Detroit blues, Funk, electric blues, Rhythm and blues
- Occupations: Bandleader, songwriter, producer, and director
- Instruments: Saxophone, vocals
- Years active: 1962–2020
- Labels: Ornament Records, Imtrat, CrossCut Records
- Website: Official website

Gary Allen Wiggins, known as "Detroit" Gary Wiggins (November 10, 1952 – November 22, 2020) was an American musician.

== Biography ==
Born in Inkster, Michigan, United States, while he was still an infant his family moved to the west side of Detroit, on Oregon Street, where he was raised. His late mother, Ruth Russell Wiggins (1920-1999), reared him in the church where he began to perform on the saxophone with Brother Lawhorn in 1962. He attended Northwestern High School until 1970, and played in a jazz band while attending community college.

At age 14, he played in Bobo Jenkins Blues Band, in Detroit. Wiggins made his first recorded release "That Good Old Funky Feeling" on 45 rpm at the age of 17 with his band, The Impacs.

The Impacs were a backing band for several of the Detroit R&B vocal groups such as the Dramatics. After touring with the Dramatics and performing in such places as the Apollo in Harlem, the T.P. Warner Theater in Washington D.C. and tours through Panama, and the eastern coast of North America, he headed west and camped in California for five years. During this time he performed with musicians such as Eddie Shaw, Eddie "Cleanhead" Vinson, Johnny Heartsman, Roy Brown, Big Mama Thornton, and many other musicians on the West Coast music scene.

In 1982, he spent a year in the Chicago blues scene where he played in the bands of the late Lefty Dizz, Sunnyland Slim, Johnny Littlejohn and Sugar Blue. and they released three vinyls.

Since moving to Europe in 1983 and in addition to producing several music concerts for Jazz Clubs and Festivals, he has toured with Charlie Musselwhite, Arnett Cobb, Screaming Jay Hawkins Jimmy Rogers, Johnny Copeland, Big Jay McNeely (Saxomania Tour, Europe), Katie Webster, Scott Hamilton, Louisiana Red and Carey Bell.

He joined the Ray Charles show in Germany twice, and went to Japan. In Osnabrueck, Germany, Rannenberg and Wiggins founded the Pink Piano Jam Sessions (where Arnett Cobb's last performance was recorded) and, after moving to Berlin, he continued inviting international stars to the Berlin Blues Café.

During his years performing throughout Europe, Wiggins collaborated with numerous emerging musicians, including guitarist Hendrik Helmer, with whom he shared several live blues performances in Germany.

Wiggins played in the A-Trane International Jazz Club Berlin – that announced him as "one of the most important american Saxophonists living in Europe", – for more than 20 years, as well as Europe's oldest jazz club in Paris Le Caveau de las Huchette.

The International Blues Duo produced and released three albums, and Wiggins has recorded with, among others, Bobby McFerrin, Robert Covington, and Roy Gaines.

Wiggins won the Berlin Jazz & Blues Award in 2002 and the German Preis der Deutschen Schallplattenkritik 1994 for Acoustic Soul, as well as appearing on the Gong Show in 1977 with Rick Murphy and David Winans as The Show Bizz Kids. In his latter years he started acrylic painting and undertook several art projects.

Wiggins died on November 22, 2020n in Bissingen an der Teck, South Germany, at the age of 68.

== Discography ==
- Introducing The International Blues Duo To The World (1984)
- The International Blues Duo Meets Blues Wire – Truly International (1987 / 2014)
- Bobby McFerrin feat. Detroit Gary Wiggins: Bobby's Thing and Lady Fair (1988)
- The International Blues Duo Featuring Katie Webster (1989)
- Time For Saxin’ (1990)
- Detroit Gary Wiggins & C.C. the Boogieman: Acoustic Soul (1992)
- I Got Up (1996)
- Fabrice Eulry & Detroit Gary Wiggins: Paris Jook (1996)
- Ballads in a Diplomatic Lounge (2004)
- Zeitlos (2005)
- Saxin’ the Blues (2011)

As a side-person

- Lefty Dizz & Shock Treatment: Live in Chicago (1982/2008)
- Klaus Lage: Schweissperlen (1985)
- Johnny Heartsman: Sacramento (1987)
- Roy Gaines: Going Home to See Mama (1987)
- Angela Brown: Live (1993)
- The Gospel Messengers: Lean on Me (1996)
- EB Davis: Fool for the Ladies (1996) with Big Jay Mc Neely
- Siggy Davis: Live (2013)
- Jimmie Smith: Timemension (1983)
- The Cat – several albums
- Errol Dixon: Mr. Boogie Woogie
- Robert Covington: The Golden Voice of Robert Covington (1987)
- The Dramatics: What You See is What You Get (1972)
- Jimmy Scott: A Pair and a Spair (1973)
- Cindy Rickmond: New Ideas (1990)
