= Iron Wedding =

Studio album by Aki Takase, Alexander von Schlippenbach
- Recorded: 19–20 March 2008
- Genre: Jazz
- Length: 65:20
- Label: Intakt

Iron Wedding is an album by Aki Takase and Alexander von Schlippenbach.

== Background ==
Pianists Aki Takase and Alexander von Schlippenbach had not recorded duets together for 15 years. The previous album was Piano Duets: Live in Berlin 93/94.

== Recording and music ==
The album was recorded on 19 and 20 March 2008. Of the 17 tracks, some "are casual-sounding formal conundrums; others charge along in a kind of psychic boogie".

== Release and reception ==
Professional ratings
Review scores
Source	Rating
Down Beat	3.5/5 stars
The Guardian	4/5 stars

Iron Wedding was released by Intakt Records. Critic John Fordham wrote that "None of this music addresses any familiar hooks, grooves or thematic ideas, but the spontaneous thoughts of two such consummate keyboard artists and thinkers make a very powerful substitute."

== Track listing ==
1. "Early Light"
2. "Circuit"
3. "Suite in Five Parts"
4. "Steinblock"
5. "Twelve Tone Tales"
6. "RTP"
7. "Gold Inside"
8. "Eight"
9. "Zankapfel"
10. "Thrown In"
11. "Off Hand"
12. "Dwarn's Late Light"
13. "Iron Wedding"
14. "Passacaglia 1, 2, 3"
15. "Yui's Dance"
16. "Rain"
17. "Far On"

== Personnel ==
- Aki Takase – piano
- Alexander von Schlippenbach – piano
