= Fernest Arceneaux =

American zydeco musician (1940–2008)

- Arceneaux playing the accordion

Background information
- Also known as: The New Prince of Accordion
- Born: Fernest Arceneaux; August 27, 1940; Lafayette, Louisiana, U.S.
- Died: September 4, 2008 (aged 68) Lafayette, Louisiana, U.S.
- Genres: Zydeco
- Occupation: Musician
- Instruments: Accordion, vocals
- Years active: 1960s–2000s
- Labels: Ornament, JSP, Mardi Gras

Fernest Arceneaux (August 27, 1940 – September 4, 2008) was a French-speaking Creole Zydeco accordionist and singer from Louisiana. He was known as "The New Prince of Accordion" for his virtuosity.

== Biography ==
Arceneaux was born to a large Creole family based in Carencro, Louisiana. Arceneaux first picked up his brother-in-law's accordion as a child and learned to play by copying his father, Ferdinand Arceneaux, a Creole accordionist whom he backed at local house parties.

By the 1960s, Arceneaux had switched to guitar in his rock and roll group Fernest and the Thunders. Not until 1978, at the behest of his hero Clifton Chenier, did Arceneaux return to the accordion.

Also in 1978, Arceneaux and his band were discovered by Belgian blues enthusiast Robert Sacre. They recorded their first album, and began touring extensively, particularly in Europe. Arceneaux later earned the title "The New Prince of Accordion" for his virtuosic playing.

Fernest and the Thunders were a groundbreaking early zydeco band that mixed blues and early R&B with Creole accordion. Arceneaux gained fame for recording "Zydeco Boogaloo" for the first time, a track that still stands as a timeless zydeco standard.

In addition to his band Fernest and The Thunders, Arceneaux's discography includes recordings under band names Fernest Arceneaux and the Zydeco All Stars, and Fernest Arceneaux & His Louisiana French Band.

In 1991, Fernest's great-nephew Corey Arceneaux toured with him for a year before forming his own band, Corey Arceneaux and the Zydeco Hot Peppers. Fernest was Corey's initial inspiration for playing the accordion.

== Style ==
Arceneaux's style was heavily influenced by soul music, including artists Ray Charles and Johnny Ace.

== Discography ==
=== Studio and live albums ===
| Album title | Record label | Stock number | Release year |
|---|---|---|---|
| Fernest and The Thunders | Blues Unlimited Records | LP-5005 | 1979 |
| Live+Well | Ornament Records (Germany) | CH-7.114 | 1979 |
| Zydeco Stomp | JSP Records (UK) | JSP 1029 | 1981 (re-released on CD in 1995 and 2011) |
| From The Heart of the Bayous | JSP Records (UK) | JSP 1064 | 1983 |
| Zydeco Thunder | Greybeard Records | G.R.I.-101 | 1985 |
| Gumbo Special | Chrisly Records | 40006 | 1987 |
| Gumbo Special | Schubert Records (Germany) | SCH-104 | 1987 |
| Gumbo Special | CMA (Germany) | CM 8016 | 1992 and 1994 |
| Rockin' Pneumonia | Ornament Records (Germany) | CM-8009 | 1991 |
| Rockin' Pneumonia | CMA (Germany) | CM-8009 | 1992 |
| Rockin' Pneumonia | Crisly Records | 30009 | 2000 |
| Zydeco Blues Party (with special guest Rockin' Dopsie, Jr.) | Mardi Gras Records | MG 1019 | 1994 |
| Old School Zydeco | Mardi Gras Records | MG 1051 | 2000 |

=== Singles ===
| Song title(s) | Album title | Record label | Stock number | Release year | Note(s) |
|---|---|---|---|---|---|
| "Nobody Wants to Dance With Me" / "Hey La Ba" | <unknown> | Blues Unlimited Records | 2005 | 1976 | Vocals by Bobby Price; 7", 45 RPM |
| "It's All Right" / "Mean Mean Woman" | <unknown> | Blues Unlimited Records | 2006 | 1976 | Bobby Price with Fernest & The Thunders; 7", 45 RPM |
| "Mustang Sally" / "Lost Lover Blues" | <unknown> | Blues Unlimited Records | 2007 | 1976 | 7", 45 RPM |
| "It Ain't Right" / "Irene" | <unknown> | Blues Unlimited Records | 2008 | 1977 | Lead vocals by Gene Morris; 7", 45 RPM |
| "Lonely Lonely Nights" / "I Know" | <unknown> | Blues Unlimited Records | 2009 | 1977 | Side 1 vocals by Gene Morris / Side 2 vocals by Kathryn Ervin; 7", 45 RPM |
| "Mother's Love" / "My Girl Josephine" | <unknown> | Blues Unlimited Records | 2011 | 1978 | 7", 45 RPM |
| "Little Woman" / "Zydeco Boogoloo" | Fernest and the Thunders | Blues Unlimited Records | 2017 | 1979? | 7", 45 RPM |
| "Last Night" / "I'm on My Way Back Home" | <unknown> | Mardi Gras Records | MG 204 | 1994 | 7", 45 RPM |
| "Midnight Train" / "Send Me Some Lovin" | <unknown> | Blues Unlimited Records | 2023 | <unknown> | 7", 45 RPM |

=== Various artist compilation albums ===
| Album title | Record label | Stock number | Release year | Song title(s) |
|---|---|---|---|---|
| Zydeco Blues | Flyright Records (UK) | LP 539 | 1978 | "Lonely Lonely Nights" |
| Zydeco Blues | Flyright Records (UK) | LP 539 | 1978 | "Lost Lover Blues" |
| Zydeco Blues | Flyright Records (UK) | LP 539 | 1978 | "Nobody Wants To Dance" |
| Zydeco Blues | Flyright Records (UK) | LP 539 | 1978 | "Irene" |
| Zydeco Blues, v. 2 | Flyright Records (UK) | FLY 600 | 1984 | "Hey La Ba" |
| Blues Experience, volume 1 | Conifer Records (UK) | CDRR 301 | 1989 | "Bye Bye Lucille" |
| Rockin' Accordion | Flyright Records (UK) | FLY 622 | 1989 | "Mean Mean Woman" (with Bobby Price, vocals) |
| Rockin' Accordion | Flyright Records (UK) | FLY 622 | 1989 | "Send Me Some Lovin'" (with Bobby Price, vocals) |
| Rockin' Accordion | Flyright Records (UK) | FLY 622 | 1989 | "Little Woman" |
| Rockin' Accordion | Flyright Records (UK) | FLY 622 | 1989 | "Mother's Love" |
| Zydeco Blues | Flyright Records (UK) | FLY CD 36 | 1991 | "Little Woman" |
| Zydeco Blues | Flyright Records (UK) | FLY CD 36 | 1991 | "Hey La Bas" |
| Zydeco Blues | Flyright Records (UK) | FLY CD 36 | 1991 | "Lonely Lonely Nights" |
| Zydeco Blues | Flyright Records (UK) | FLY CD 36 | 1991 | "Lost Lover Blues" |
| Zydeco Blues | Flyright Records (UK) | FLY CD 36 | 1991 | "Nobody Wants To Dance" |
| Zydeco Blues | Flyright Records (UK) | FLY CD 36 | 1991 | "Irene" |
| Zydeco Blues | Flyright Records (UK) | FLY CD 36 | 1991 | "Nobody Wants To Dance With Me" (Bobby Price, vocals) |
| Zydeco Blues | Flyright Records (UK) | FLY CD 36 | 1991 | "Send Me Some Lovin'" (Bobby Price, vocals) |
| Zydeco Blues | Flyright Records (UK) | FLY CD 36 | 1991 | "Mother's Love" |
| Alligator Stomp: Cajun & Zydeco Classics, Vol. 3 | Rhino | R2 70312 | 1992 | "It's Alright" |
| The Ultimate Blues Collection [Tonträger]: Volume 2 | CMA (Germany) | 11002/5/8 | 1992 | <unknown> |
| The Real Blues Sampler | Ornament Records | CM-8000 | 1991 | "Don't Cry No More" |
| The Real Blues Sampler | CMA (Germany) | CM 8000 | 1992 | "Don't Cry No More" |
| Best of Louisiana Music: Sampler | Mardi Gras Records | MG 5015 | 1995 | "Zydeco Boogaloo" |
| Mississippi Blues, volume two | Pulse Records | PBX CD 402/2 | 1996 | "Got You on My Mind" |
| Mississippi Blues, volume two | Pulse Records | PBX CD 402/2 | 1996 | "Bernadette" |
| Super Cajun! : Best of Cajun/Zydeco | Mardi Gras Records | MG 1032 | 1996 | "Bernadette" |
| Super Cajun! : Best of Cajun/Zydeco | Mardi Gras Records | MG 1032 | 1996 | "Jolie Blonde" |
| Bayou Beat | EasyDisc | ED CD 7053 | 1997 | "Bernadette" |
| Zydeco: Dance Party | K-Tel International | 4012-2 | 1997 | "The Fish Song" |
| Zydeco: Dance Party | K-Tel International | 4012-2 | 1997 | "Jolie Blonde" |
| Zydeco: Dance Party | K-Tel International | 4012-2 | 1997 | "I'm on My Way Back Home" |
| Zydeco Party | Jewel Records | EDCD7045 | 1997 | "Bye Bye Lucille" |
| Zydeco Party | EasyDisc | ED CD 7045 | 1998 | "Bye Bye Lucille" |
| Zydeco Stomp: All Instrumental | Rounder | ED CD 7065 | 1998 | "Zydeco Stomp" |
| ¡Garonne! le festival: Toulouse, le fleuve aux artistes | Sude (France) | SDB 69120 ? | 2001 | "Going Back To Big Mamou" |
| Ultimate Zydeco | Mardi Gras Records | MG 1056 | 2001 | "I'm on My Way Back Home" |
| Ultimate Zydeco | Mardi Gras Records | MG 1056 | 2001 | "Eh, Mama" |
| Zydecajun Instrumentals | Mambito Records | MR001 | 2002 | <unknown> |
| The Ultimate Zydeco Party | Mambito Records | MR018 | 2003 | "Going Back To Big Mamou" |
| The Ultimate Zydeco Party | Mambito Records | MR018 | 2003 | "Don't Mess with My Toot Toot" |
| Best of Zydeco | Mardi Gras Records | MG 5101 | 2005 | "I'm on My Way Back Home" |
| Best of Zydeco | Mardi Gras Records | MG 5101 | 2005 | "Pine Grove Blues (My Negress)" |
| Ultimate New Orleans | Mardi Gras Records | MG 1091 | 2005 | "My Negress (Pine Grove Blues)" |
| Bayou Trax: Louisiana Tailgatin' | Mardi Gras Records | MG 1116 | 2008 | "Don't Mess with My Toot-Toot" |
| Blues Party | Putumayo World Music | PUT 360-2 | 2016 | "I Don't Want Nobody" |

=== Guest appearance credits ===
| Album title | Artist(s) | Record label | Stock number | Release year | Role |
|---|---|---|---|---|---|
| Two Trains a' Runnin' | Bobby Price | Blues Unlimited Records | LP-5025 | 1985 | accordion |
| Zydeco Train Revue | J. J. Caillier | Caillier Records | LP-8601 | 1986 | accordion |
