= Ornament Records =

German record label

- Founded: 1972
- Founder: Siegfried A. Christmann
- Genre: Blues, jazz, folk
- Country of origin: Germany
- Official website: www.ornament-musikproduktion.de

Ornament Records is a German record label set up in 1972 by Siegfried A. "Ziggy" Christmann. It initially specialised in issuing live recordings of blues artists who were touring Germany. Soon the label started releasing jazz and German (especially Moselle Franconian) folk music as well.

Artists who were recorded for the label or in some cases whose US recordings were released on the label included Doctor Ross, Willie Mabon, John Lee Hooker, Blind John Davis, Jim Kahr Group, Champion Jack Dupree, Sunnyland Slim, Tommy Tucker, Big Joe Williams, Fernest Arceneaux, Louisiana Red, Al Rapone, Katie Webster, Big Jay McNeely, Detroit Gary Wiggins & Chris Rannenberg as the International Blues Duo and Black Cat Bone.

Almost all of the label's original blues LPs were—some with additional bonus tracks—re-released on CD on the CMA label in 1991. Some of these were released again on the Chrisly label in 2000 under the Ornament Blues Masters series.

Ornament also had two short-lived blues sub-labels: Chrischaa and ESCEHA Schallplatten. Both of these folded in June 1978.

== See also ==
- List of record labels
