= Paul Lovens =

German musician

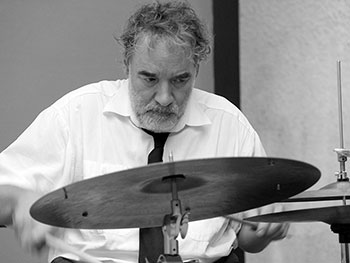
- Paul Lovens in Aarhus, Denmark

Background information
- Born: 6 June 1949 (age 76); Aachen, West Germany
- Genres: Free jazz, Free improvisation
- Occupation: Musician
- Instruments: Drums, percussion
- Labels: Po Torch

Paul Lovens (born 6 June 1949) is a German musician. He plays drums, percussion, singing saw, and cymbals. He has performed with the Aardvark Jazz Orchestra and Berlin Contemporary Jazz Orchestra.

He was born in Aachen, Germany. In the early 1970s, he was part of a trio with pianist Alexander von Schlippenbach. Since then he has worked with Cecil Taylor, Harri Sjöström, Günther Christmann, Eugene Chadbourne, Peter Brötzmann, Teppo Hauta-Aho, Mats Gustafsson, Thomas Lehn, Phil Wachsmann, Rajesh Mehta and Joëlle Léandre. He also played with Florian Schneider and Ebehard Kranemann in an early incarnation of Kraftwerk. Since 1967, Lovens has run the record label Po Torch with Paul Lytton.

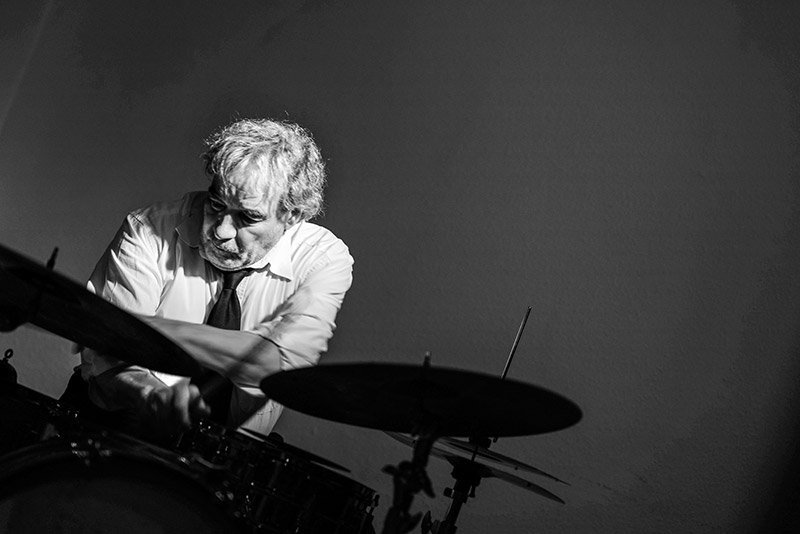
Paul Lovens performs in Aarhus, Denmark, in 2018.

== Discography ==
=== As leader ===
- Voerkel/Frey/Lovens (FMP, 1976)
- Carpathes with Michel Pilz, Peter Kowald (FMP, 1976)
- Was It Me with Paul Lytton (Po Torch, 1977)
- Paul Rutherford/Paul Lovens (Po Torch, 1978)
- Moinho Da Asneira with Paul Lytton (Po Torch, 1980)
- Weavers with Gunter Christmann, Maarten Altena (Po Torch, 1980)
- The Last Supper with Toshinori Kondo (Po Torch, 1981)
- Der Traum Der Roten Plame (FMP, 1982)
- Death Is Our Eternal Friend with Toshinori Kondo (DIW, 1983)
- The Fetch with Paul Lytton (Po Torch, 1984)
- Stranger Than Love with Alexander von Schlippenbach (Po Torch, 1985)
- News from the Shed with Butcher/Durrant/Malfatti/Russell (Acta, 1989)
- Regalia with Cecil Taylor (FMP, 1989)
- Goldberg with Urs Voerkel (Po Torch, 1990)
- Nothing to Read with Mats Gustafsson (Blue Tower, 1991)
- Choice-Chase with Stephan Wittwer (Intakt, 1995)
- Mouth Eating Trees and Related Activities with Mats Gustafsson (Okka Disk, 1996)
- Patrizio with Eugene Chadbourne (Victo, 1997)
- Quicksand with Frank Gratkowski (Meniscus, 2001)
- Papajo (Emanem, 2002)
- Acthung with Thomas Lehn (Grob, 2003)
- Trio with Christmann/Gustaffson (FMP 2010)
- Wegen Meines with Moodswing 3 (Rai Trade, 2010)
- Live at Hasselt with Vandeweyer/Van Hove/Blume (NoBusiness, 2013)
- Live 2013 with Stefan Keune (FMR, 2016)
- Mein Freund Der Baum with Stoffner/Mahall (Wide Ear, 2017)
- The Room: Time and Space with Seppe Gebruers, Hugo Antunes (el NEGOCITO Records, Po Torch & Troika vzw, 2018)
- Nothing Particularly Horrible with Keune/Russell/Schneider (FMR, 2019)
- Meeting the Past (Zarek, 2020)

With Globe Unity Orchestra

- Live in Wuppertal (FMP, 1973)
- Der Alte Mann Bricht ... Sein Schweigen (FMP, 1974)
- Bavarian Calypso & Good Bye (FMP, 1975)
- Evidence Vol. 1 (FMP, 1976)
- Into the Valley Vol. 2 (FMP, 1976)
- Pearls (FMP, 1977)
- Jahrmarkt & Local Fair (Po Torch, 1977)
- Improvisations (Japo, 1978)
- Hamburg '74 (FMP, 1979)
- Compositions (Japo, 1980)
- Intergalactic Blow (Japo, 1983)
- Rumbling (FMP, 1991)
- 20th Anniversary (FMP, 1993)
- Globe Unity 2002 (Intakt, 2003)
- Baden-Baden '75 (FMP, 2011)

=== As sideman ===
With Alfred Harth

- Es Herrscht Uhu Im Land (Japo, 1981)
- 1970–1971 (Laubhuette, 2007)
- Groups Duos (Laubhuette, 2009)

With Sven-Ake Johansson

- Idylle & Katastrophen (Po Torch, 1980)
- Uber Ursache & Wirkung Der Meinungsverschiedenheiten Beim Turmbau Zu Babel (FMP, 1989)
- Fur Paul Klee (Jazzwerkstatt, 2012)

With Evan Parker

- The Ericle of Dolphi (Po Torch, 1989)
- 50th Birthday Concert (Leo, 1994)
- 2x3=5 (Leo, 2001)

With Mario Schiano

- Unlike (Splasc(H), 1990)
- Meetings (Splasc(H), 1994)
- Used to Be Friends (Splasc(H), 1996)
- Social Security (Victo, 1997)

With Alexander von Schlippenbach

- Pakistani Pomade (FMP, 1973)
- Three Nails Left (FMP, 1975)
- The Hidden Peak (FMP, 1977)
- Anticlockwise (FMP, 1983)
- Das Hohe Lied (Po Torch, 1991)
- Detto Fra Di Noi (Po Torch, 1982)
- Elf Bagatellen (FMP, 1990)
- Physics (FMP, 1993)
- The Morlocks and Other Pieces (FMP, 1994)
- Complete Combustion (FMP, 1999)
- Swinging the Bim (FMP, 2000)
- Hunting the Snake (Atavistic, 2000)
- Globe Unity 67 & 70 (Atavistic, 2001)
- Broomriding (Psi, 2003)
- Compression: Live at Total Music Meeting 2002 (a/l/l, 2004)
- Winterreise (Psi, 2006)
- Globe Unity 40 Years (Intakt, 2007)
- Gold Is Where You Find It (Intakt, 2008)
- Bauhaus Dessau (Intakt, 2010)
- First Recordings (Trost, 2014)
- Features (Intakt, 2015)
- Warsaw Concert (Intakt, 2016)
- Globe Unity 50 Years (Intakt, 2018)

With Aki Takase

- St. Louis Blues (Enja, 2001)
- Plays Fats Waller (Enja, 2003)
- New Blues (Yellowbird, 2012)
- Plays Fats Waller in Berlin (Jazzwerkstatt, 2013)
- Signals (Trost, 2016)

With others

- Rajesh Mehta, Orka:solos and duos feat. Paul Lovens (Hatology, 1998)
- Aardvark Jazz Orchestra, Trumpet Madness (Leo, 2005)
- Maarten Altena, Pisa 1980: Improvisors' Symposium (Incus, 1981)
- Berlin Contemporary Jazz Orchestra, Live in Japan '96 (DIW, 1997)
- Paul Burwell, Circadian Rhythm (Incus, 1980)
- Eugene Chadbourne, Hellington Country (Intakt, 1997)
- Gunter Christmann, Sometimes Crosswise (Moers Music, 1995)
- Ivar Grydeland, These Six (Sofa, 2003)
- Peter Kowald, Peter Kowald Quintet (FMP, 1973)
- Joelle Leandre, Joëlle Léandre Project (Leo, 2000)
- Joelle Leandre, At the Le Mans Jazz Festival (Leo, 2006)
- Guerino Mazzola, Synthesis (Stoa Music, 1991)
- Irène Schweizer, Ramifications (Ogun, 1975)
- Irène Schweizer, Live at Taktlos (Intakt, 1986)
- Cecil Taylor, Lifting the Bandstand (Fundacja Słuchaj!, 2021)
- Philipp Wachsmann, Free Zone Appleby 2006 (Psi, 2007)
