= Two for Two =

Studio album by Aki Takase, Han Bennink
- Recorded: 2–4 May 2011
- Genre: Jazz
- Length: 59:07
- Label: Intakt

Two for Two is an album by Aki Takase and Han Bennink.

== Recording and music ==
The album was recorded on 2–4 May 2011. The performances are by pianist Aki Takase and drummer Han Bennink. Most of the 16 tracks are credited to Takase as composer.

== Release and reception ==
Professional ratings
Review scores
Source	Rating
AllMusic	4/5 stars
Down Beat	4/5 stars

Two for Two was released by Intakt Records. The AllMusic reviewer concluded that "The predictably unpredictable results are sure to gratify seasoned modern jazz lovers and dazzle impressionable listeners unfamiliar with this kind of creative exchange". The Down Beat reviewer commented on the humour in some of the playing and wrote that "fans of both musicians will enjoy this solid and cohesive – not to mention delightful – effort".

== Track listing ==
1. "Two for Two"
2. "My Tokyo"
3. "Locomotive"
4. "Zankapfel"
5. "Knut"
6. "Baumkuchen"
7. "Monochrome"
8. "Raise Four"
9. "Do You Know What It Means to Miss New Orleans?"
10. "A Chotto Matte"
11. "Hat and Beard"
12. "Ohana Han"
13. "Rolled Up"
14. "Hell Und Dunkel"
15. "Hommage to Thelonious Monk"
16. "Two for Two"

== Personnel ==
- Aki Takase – piano
- Han Bennink – drums
