= Berlin Contemporary Jazz Orchestra (album) =

Studio album by Berlin Contemporary Jazz Orchestra
- Released: 1990
- Recorded: May 1989
- Studio: Studio 10, RIAS Berlin
- Genre: Jazz; big band
- Length: 49:38
- Label: ECM; ECM 1409
- Producer: ECM, RIAS Berlin

Berlin Contemporary Jazz Orchestra chronology
Berlin Contemporary Jazz Orchestra (1990)	The Morlocks and Other Pieces (1994)

Berlin Contemporary Jazz Orchestra is the debut album by the eponymous ensemble—conducted by founder Alexander von Schlippenbach—recorded in May 1989 and released on ECM the following year.

== Reception ==
Professional ratings
Review scores
Source	Rating
AllMusic	3/5 stars
The Penguin Guide to Jazz	4/4 stars

In a review for AllMusic, Brian Olewnick wrote: "This album ... is a good deal less raucous than one might otherwise expect. All three compositions ... are only a step or three away from fairly mainstream big band jazz.... [The] release is solid and reasonably enjoyable, but much less 'contemporary' than one might have hoped."

The authors of the Penguin Guide to Jazz Recordings awarded the album 4 stars, calling it a "superb set," and stated: "Wheeler's 'Ana' is a long, almost hymnic, piece whose mournful aspect nevertheless doesn't soften some powerful soloing... Mengelberg's 'Reef Und Kneebus' and 'Salz' are very much in the line of a post-war Dutch style in which jazz is almost as dominant an element as serial procedures... Thoroughly enjoyable and thought-provoking music."

Writing for ECM blog Between Sound and Space, Tyran Grillo commented: "This is a full recording, one that accentuates the breezy rhythm section and keeps the brass well separated. The band blows free and easy and tries its best to keep us out of the compositional rut with some freer gesticulations."

== Track listing ==
No.	Title	Writer(s)	Length
1.	"Ana"	Kenny Wheeler	22:29

No.	Title	Writer(s)	Length
1.	"Salz"	Misha Mengelberg	7:41
2.	"Reef und Kneebus"	Misha Mengelberg	19:28
Total length:			49:38

== Personnel ==
- Alexander von Schlippenbach – conductor
  - Berlin Contemporary Jazz Orchestra
    - Paul van Kemenade, Felix Wahnschaffe – alto saxophone
    - Gerd Dudek – soprano saxophone, tenor saxophone, clarinet, flute
    - Walter Gauchel – tenor saxophone
    - E. L. Petrowsky – baritone saxophone
    - Willem Breuker – baritone saxophone, bass clarinet
    - Benny Bailey, Thomas Heberer, Henry Lowther – trumpet
    - Kenny Wheeler – trumpet, flugelhorn
    - Henning Berg, Hermann Breuer, Hubert Katzenbeier – trombone
    - Utz Zimmermann – bass trombone
    - Aki Takase, Misha Mengelberg – piano
    - Günter Lenz – bass
    - Ed Thigpen – drums
