= Live in Japan '96 =

Live album by Berlin Contemporary Jazz Orchestra
- Released: 1997
- Recorded: July 31, 1996, and August 6, 1996
- Venue: Nakano Public Hall, Tokyo, Japan, and Shin-Kobe Oriental Theatre, Kobe, Japan
- Genre: Jazz, big band
- Label: DIW; DIW-922

Berlin Contemporary Jazz Orchestra chronology
The Morlocks and Other Pieces (1994)	Live in Japan '96 (1997)

Live in Japan '96 is a live album by the Berlin Contemporary Jazz Orchestra. One track was recorded in July 1996 at Nakano Public Hall in Tokyo, while the remaining tracks were recorded in August 1996 at Shin-Kobe Oriental Theatre in Kobe. The album was released in 1997 by DIW. The music was conducted by Alexander von Schlippenbach and Aki Takase.

== Reception ==
Professional ratings
Review scores
Source	Rating
AllMusic	4/5 stars
The Penguin Guide to Jazz	3.5/4 stars

In a review for AllMusic, Joslyn Lane wrote: "Live in Japan '96 is an excellent show from a premiere cast of musicians."

Bill Shoemaker, writing for Jazz Times, commented: "free improvisations are well-integrated into the structure of the works... Schlippenbach and Takase are a formidable composer/arranger/pianist/conductor tag-team; the Berlin Contemporary Jazz Orchestra is an excellent vehicle for their uncompromising work."

== Track listing ==
1. "Eric Dolphy Medley: The Prophet / Serene / Hat and Beard" (Eric Dolphy; arranged by Aki Takase) – 17:04
2. "The Morlocks" (Alexander von Schlippenbach) – 15:46
3. "Shijo No Ai" (traditional; arranged by Aki Takase) – 6:21
4. "Way Down South Where the Blues Began" (W. C. Handy; arranged by Alexander von Schlippenbach) – 12:18
5. "Jackhammer" (Alexander von Schlippenbach) – 10:29
6. "Goodbye" (Gordon Jenkins; arranged by Willem Breuker) – 4:17

Track 2 recorded on July 31, 1996, at Nakano Public Hall, Tokyo. Remaining tracks recorded on August 6, 1996, at Shin-Kobe Oriental Theatre, Kobe.

== Personnel ==
- Alexander von Schlippenbach – piano, conductor
- Aki Takase – piano, conductor
- Eiichi Hayashi – alto saxophone
- Walter Gauchel – tenor saxophone
- Hiroaki Katayama – tenor saxophone, baritone saxophone
- Evan Parker – tenor saxophone, soprano saxophone
- Gerd Dudek – tenor saxophone, soprano saxophone, flute, clarinet
- Rudi Mahall – bass clarinet
- Axel Dörner – trumpet
- Henry Lowther – trumpet
- Issei Igarashi – trumpet
- Thomas Heberer – trumpet
- Haruki Sato – trombone
- Marc Boukouya – trombone
- Paul Rutherford – trombone
- Wolter Wierbos – trombone
- Nobuyoshi Ino – bass
- Paul Lovens – drums
