= Berlin Contemporary Jazz Orchestra =

German jazz ensemble

The Berlin Contemporary Jazz Orchestra is a large German jazz ensemble led by Alexander von Schlippenbach. The orchestra performs orchestral jazz and experimental big band music and has included in its ranks such leading musicians as Misha Mengelberg and Kenny Wheeler. The orchestra, which performs rather infrequently, was founded in 1988 by Schlippenbach and has commissioned works by Carla Bley, Manfred Schoof, and Willem Breuker, among others.

== Founding members ==
- Marc Stutz Boukouya
- Axel Dörner
- Gerd Dudek
- Bruno Leicht
- Walter Gauchel
- Dan Gottshall
- Thomas Heberer
- Jörg Huke
- Nobuyuki Ino
- Paul Lovens
- Henry Lowther
- Rudi Mahall
- Evan Parker
- Aki Takase
- Alexander von Schlippenbach
- Felix Wahnschaffe
- Utz Zimmermann

== Discography ==
- Berlin Contemporary Jazz Orchestra (ECM, 1990)
- The Morlocks and Other Pieces (FMP, 1994)
- Live in Japan '96 (DIW, 1998) with Aki Takase

== See also ==
- List of experimental big bands
