= List of experimental big bands =

Experimental jazz big bands.

== A ==
- Aardvark Jazz Orchestra
- Muhal Richard Abrams Orchestra
- Neil Ardley's Kaleidoscope of Rainbows
- Darcy James Argue's Secret Society

== B ==
- Berlin Contemporary Jazz Orchestra
- Anthony Braxton's Creative Orchestra Music
- Willem Breuker Kollektief
- Brotherhood of Breath
- Brussels Jazz Orchestra

== C ==
- Carla Bley Band
- Centipede

== D ==
- Bill Dixon Orchestra
- Pierre Dørge's New Jungle Orchestra

== E ==
- Either/Orchestra
- Don Ellis Orchestra
- Ensemble Kappa
- Gil Evans Orchestra

== F ==
- Flat Earth Society
- Satoko Fujii Orchestra

== G ==
- Michael Gibbs Orchestra
- George Gruntz Concert Jazz Band
- Glasgow Improvisers Orchestra
- Globe Unity Orchestra
- The Vinny Golia Large Ensemble
- Gordon Goodwin's Big Phat Band

== H ==
- Hard Rubber Orchestra
- Julius Hemphill Big Band

== I ==
- ICP Orchestra
- Italian Instabile Orchestra

== J ==
- The Thad Jones/Mel Lewis Orchestra
- Jazz Composer's Orchestra (a.k.a. Jazz Composer's Orchestra of America)

== K ==
- Jeff Kaiser Ockodektet
- Stan Kenton and the Innovations Orchestra

== L ==
- Liberation Music Orchestra
- London Jazz Composers Orchestra
- Loose Tubes

== M ==
- Tina Marsh and the Creative Opportunity Orchestra
- The Microscopic Septet
- Mingus Big Band
- David Murray Big Band

== N ==
- Nucleus
- Paal Nilssen-Love's Large Unit

== O ==
- Orange Then Blue

== P ==
- William Parker & The Little Huey Creative Orchestra

== R ==
- Sun Ra and his Arkestra
- George Russell and the Living Time Orchestra

== S ==
- Sam Rivers and the Rivbea All-Star Orchestra
- Scratch Orchestra
- Seatbelts
- Shibusashirazu Orchestra
- Maria Schneider Orchestra

== T ==
- Cecil Taylor's Orchestra of Two Continents

== V ==
- Ken Vandermark's Territory Band
- Vienna Art Orchestra

== W ==
- Mike Westbrook Orchestra
