= Hendrik Helmer =

German-American guitarist, songwriter, and producer

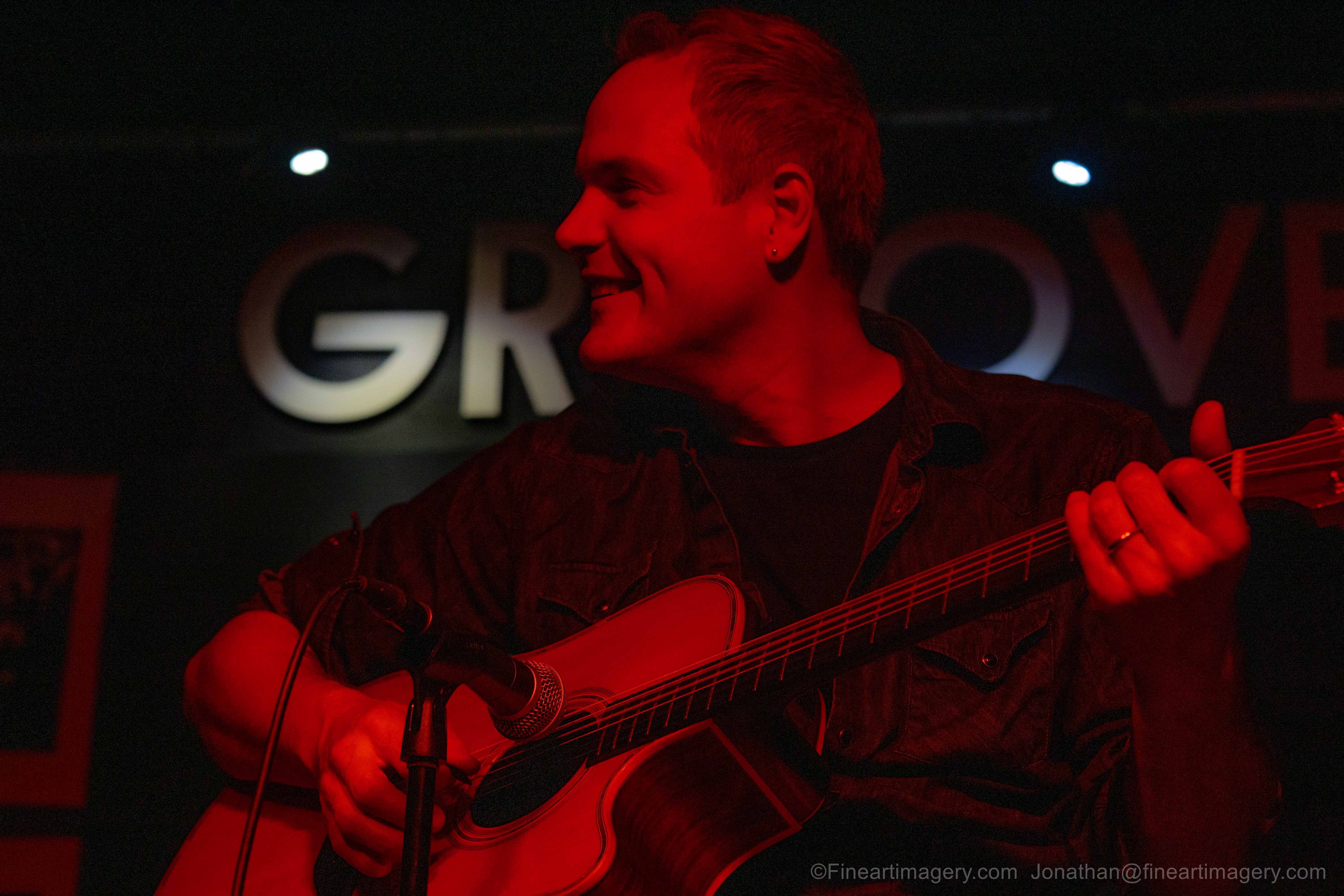

Background information
- Born: Hendrik Helmer; June 5, 1970 (age 56); Münster, Germany
- Origin: New York City, United States
- Genres: Pop, rock, blues, jazz
- Occupations: Musician, producer, educator
- Instruments: Guitar, bass, vocals & piano
- Years active: 1985–present
- Labels: Licorice Pizza Records, Henmusicrecords
- Website: www.hendrikhelmer.com www.hefa-productions.com

Hendrik Helmer is an American guitarist, songwriter, and producer based in New York City. He has collaborated and worked with artists including Carly Simon, Paul Shaffer, John Patitucci, Carmine Rojas, Vinnie Colaiuta, Steve Ferrone, Keith Carlock, Oz Noy, and Madonna, and has worked with a wide range of international performers across pop, jazz, and blues genres. He has also taught at the Juilliard School.

== Early life and education ==
Helmer studied music in the Netherlands for six years before relocating to New York City in 1998. Details about his early musical influences include jazz and classical guitar training and exposure to both European and American classic rock, jazz, and blues traditions. He was picked by the Dutch percussionist Nippy Noya to be a part of the Berklee College of Music seminar in Epe, Germany, in 1996.

Helmer’s most prominent teachers were Peter Bernstein, Larry Goldings, Reggie Workman, Buster Williams, Andrew Cyrille, Michael Carvin, Jon Davis, Lee Anne Ledgerwood, Garry Dial, Phil Markowitz, Jim ten Boske & Bobby Sanabria.

At age 15, Helmer began performing weekly at the Pink Piano in Osnabrück, Germany, where he had the opportunity to play alongside visiting American blues musicians. These formative performances introduced him to artists who would later become significant collaborators in his musical development.

In his teenage years, Helmer's passion for live performance led him to collaborate with a number of noted blues artists, including Gary Wiggins, Louisiana Red, Eddie C. Campbell, Big Jay McNeely, Jean Carroll, and Angela Brown. These early collaborations helped establish Helmer's foundation as a versatile live performer with deep roots in blues and soul traditions.

Between 1995 and 1997, Helmer toured extensively throughout France, Poland, Belgium and the Netherlands with percussionist Nippy Noya, performing numerous live shows including a notable concert at Paradiso in Amsterdam, which featured René Engels on drums.

== Career ==
Building on his early experiences performing alongside blues and jazz legends, Helmer went on to establish himself as a versatile guitarist, composer, and producer within the New York City music scene.

He has worked, performed, and recorded with artists including Amber, Carly Simon, Wyclef Jean, Maxwell, and Paul Shaffer. Helmer's career spans both live performance and studio recording sessions, blending his blues foundation with pop, rock, and soul influences.

In 2000, Helmer received a documentary film award in Frankfurt am Main, Germany, for Go With the Flow, a film that was produced by Karl Wortmann through the production company Ikon3film.

Throughout the 2000s and 2010s, Helmer remained an active presence in New York's recording and performance circuit. He contributed to albums with artists such as Marie-Claire Cremers (Amber), Carmen Browne, and Greer Baxter, and played on the benefit compilation Listen (A Benefit Album for Our Time), which also featured Carly Simon, Daryl Hall, Ann Hampton Callaway, Blue Man Group, and Mandy Patinkin.

From 2008 to 2014, Helmer collaborated with the Our Time Company, performing at special events and workshops alongside prominent actors such as Edie Falco, Victor Garber, Paul Rudd, Sam Rockwell, and British comedian John Oliver. In 2005, he also coached actor Oscar Isaac during a three-month rehearsal at the Juilliard School for Isaac's final performance piece, The American Occupation, directed by Trip Cull.

In 2012, Helmer released his EP Tales of Lost Love, which received a five-star rating from AllMusic and was described as "thoughtfully crafted" with a "reflective and almost cinematic quality." He made his Carnegie Hall debut on June 14, 2014.

Since 2015, Helmer has worked as a private guitar instructor for high-profile clients, including Madonna’s children, Rocco Ritchie and David Banda, and, in 2023, English actress Mickey Sumner, daughter of Sting. One of Helmer's longtime students, Sarah Solovay, won the John Mayer Songwriting Competition in 2008 for her single "Gone".

On December 31, 2025, Helmer was interviewed by radio presenter by Musicologist Dr. Holger Hettinger on Deutschlandfunk Kultur's program Musik im Gespräch, discussing the climate for cultural professionals in the United States. In addition to his extensive session work, Helmer has released solo albums and EPs showcasing his skills as a composer, arranger, and bandleader.

== Recent work ==
In 2018, Helmer collaborated with Michele Bettencourt on the album New Normal. In 2025, he produced, wrote, and recorded a follow-up project with Bettencourt in New York City titled Vampire Time, released on Licorice Pizza Records in Los Angeles. The release was supported by the single Everybody Loves a Circus, with coverage in New Music Radio Network describing Helmer as an "accomplished guitarist in New York City" and one of the exceptional musicians involved in the project.

The single also received chart recognition. It debuted at number 28 on the Independent Music Network Mainstream Top 30 Countdown, was listed among the most-added tracks on National Radio Hits AC40 with 11 reporting stations, and appeared on New Music Weekly's "Up & Coming" list with five station adds. The recent single Gilded Age hits number one in the top 40 internet charts in July 2026. In 2025 Helmer also recorded his 4th studio album FOR HARRY which featured drum icon Vinnie Colaiuta on drums on 4 songs.

Additional reporting in Airplay Access emphasized Bettencourt's early collaboration with Helmer, noting that she "joined forces with Hendrik Helmer, an accomplished guitarist in New York City" to record New Normal, which, although never marketed or distributed, was described as "as timely now as it was then."

Drummer Andy Parker of UFO also referenced Helmer as part of the production team for Vampire Time, alongside Everett Bradley, Steve Ferrone, and Kerry Brown.

In 2025, Helmer contributed to the single "Everybody Loves a Circus" by Michele Bettencourt & Vampire Time, which received the Independent Music Network (IMN) Award for Mainstream Breakout Single. Michele Bettencourt's album Vampire Time received three nominations in 2026: Favorite Single, Mainstream Breakout Single and New Discovery Artist by the IMN.

In 2026, Helmer co-founded Hefa-Production with Fawn Segerson, an emerging artist production that they have jointly operated since June 2026.

== Album and single releases ==
Year	Title	Notes	Reference
1998	How Little We Know	Studio album; Kawomusic	
1999	Hugging Perfekt Stranger	Studio album; Kawomusic	
2004	My Kind of World	Album	
2004	Life in the Loop	Album	
2005	You Move Me	Single	
2005	Voodoo	Single	
2007	My Name is Rasulus	Album	
2007	Palladium II: Horses On Mars	Album	
2008	Listen (A Benefit Album for Our Time)	Various	
2009	Primetime	Album, guitars	
2010	Holedelic	Album	
2012	Tales of Lost Love	EP	
2019	Bleed (with Greer Baxter)	EP	
2019	Believe (with Devonee B.)	Album; production	
2019	Something's There (with Devonee B.)	Single	
2018	New Normal (with Michele Bettencourt)	EP	
2020	Carousel (Keith Ward)	EP	
2019	Push You Away, Bags Half Packed (Greer Baxter)	Co-production	
2020	My Way Life at Rockwood Musical (Keith Ward)	Live	
2025	Vampire Time (Michele Bettencourt and Vampire Time)	Licorice Pizza Records studio album	
2026	For Harry	EP	
2026	Cryin'	Single	
2026	Nothing Without You	Single	
2026	Best of Huggin Perfekt Stranger	Album	
2026	Best of Life in the Loop	Album	

Year	Title	Artist	Role
2019	You're in Love With Me	Glenn Kidd	Backing vocals, co-producer and engineer
2020	Everyday People	Glenn Kidd	Drums and percussion, co-producer and co-engineer
2021	Life Is for the Living	Glenn Kidd	Guitar, co-producer and engineer
2022	Give Up the Ghost	Glenn Kidd	Co-producer and co-engineer

== Music videos ==
Year	Title	Artist	Reference
2001	Blaue Schuh'	Karl Schmieder	
2010	Love You From Afar	Hendrik Helmer	
2012	Tales of Lost Love	Hendrik Helmer	
2012	If There is a Heaven	Hendrik Helmer	
2012	The Same	Hendrik Helmer	
2012	Better Days	Hendrik Helmer	
2013	Don't Wanna Make You Mine	Kiki Voss	
2013	Take Me As I Am	Kiki Voss	
2013	God in Drag	Glenn Kidd	
2025	Trash	Michele Bettencourt	
2025	Vampire Time	Michele Bettencourt	
2025	Everybody loves a circus	Michele Bettencourt	
2026	Meat Head	Gary Fisher	
2026	Gilded Age	Michele Bettencourt	
2026	Promo video "For Harry"	Hendrik Helmer	
2026	Taking' out the trash	Michele Bettencourt	

=== Other notable performances ===
- Featured guitarist with Lucy Woodward for Verve Records (2010), including for the music video Ragdoll. (Performance available on YouTube: YouTube)

== As featured guitarist ==
Year	Title	Artist/Context	Reference
2001	Hausnummer 19	Karl Schmieder	
2004	My Kind of World	Amber	
2005	You Move Me	Amber	
2005	Voodoo	Amber	
2007	My Name is Rasulus	Rasulus	
2007	Palladium II: Horses On Mars	Palladium	
2008	Listen (A Benefit Album for Our Time)	Various (Carly Simon, Daryl Hall, John Forté, Skylar Grey, Ann Hampton Callaway, Blue Man Group, Mandy Patinkin)	
2009	Primetime	Eddie Bishai / Guitars	
2010	Holedelic	Everett Bradley	
2010	You're the Same As Me	Gigi Fouquet	
2011	Red Light	Kiku Collins	
2011	Bethesda	Sasha Di Bona / Guitars	
2014	Cloud Ballet EP	Carmen Browne	
2015	Carmen Browne	Carmen Browne	
2016	Something there	Devonne B	
2018	Crawling On My Hands	Matthew Curran	
2019	Everything to Me	Keith Ward	
2019	Believe	Devonee B. / Producer, guitarist	
2019	Talkin' 'Bout You and Me	Henry Dee	
2021	Life Is for the Living	Glenn Kidd / Guitar, co-producer and engineer	
2024	Underachive	Dallas Connors	
2024	Lover Girl	Luzc Ellis	
2024	Design Her	Luzc Ellis	
2024	Spare me a little of your Love	Henry Dee	
2024	Cant find the time	Henry Dee	
2025	Boundaries	Luzc Ellis	
2025	Vampire Time	Michele Bettencourt	
2025	Everybody Loves a Circus	Michele Bettencourt w/ Vampire Time	
2025	After hours	Fawn Segerson	
2025	Across Your Pillow	Frank Basile	
2025	Aug. 21st	Shawn Cortel	
2025	Get Her	Baby Yungin	
2026	For Harry	Hendrik Helmer	
2026	Crying	Hendrik Helmer	
2026	Nothing without you	Hendrik Helmer	
2026	Huggin' Perfekt Stranger (Best Of)	Hendrik Helmer	
2026	How close	Michele Bettencourt featuring Sari Greenberg	
2026	Life in the Loop (Best Of)	Hendrik Helmer	
2026	Pressure	Luzc Ellis	
2026	Tennesee Whiskey	Sadie Hargis	

== HEFA-Production releases ==
Year	Title	Artist/Context	Reference
2026	Pressure	Luzc Ellis	
2026	Tennesee Whiskey	Sadie Hargis	
