= The Morlocks and Other Pieces =

Studio album by Alexander von Schlippenbach and Berlin Contemporary Jazz Orchestra
- Released: 1994
- Recorded: July 10 and 11, 1993
- Studio: Studio 10, RIAS Berlin
- Genre: Jazz, Big band
- Label: FMP; CD 61
- Producer: Alexander von Schlippenbach, Jost Gebers

Berlin Contemporary Jazz Orchestra chronology
Berlin Contemporary Jazz Orchestra (1990)	The Morlocks and Other Pieces (1994)	Live in Japan '96 (1998)

The Morlocks and Other Pieces is an album by Alexander von Schlippenbach and the Berlin Contemporary Jazz Orchestra. It was recorded in July 1993 at RIAS Studio 10 in Berlin, and was released in 1994 by FMP. It features six compositions by Schlippenbach with dates ranging from 1983 to 1993.

== Reception ==
Professional ratings
Review scores
Source	Rating
AllMusic	4/5 stars
The Penguin Guide to Jazz	3.5/4 stars

In a review for AllMusic, Thom Jurek wrote: "With ten years between the earliest and latest compositions here, one can imagine how varied the program is... it's a wonderful collection of modern music that showcases even further the vast range of musical languages that von Schlippenbach has at his disposal."

The authors of the Penguin Guide to Jazz Recordings stated: "This record establishes Schlippenbach much more clearly as a composer. It is worth comparing its language to that of the London Jazz Composers' Orchestra under Barry Guy, which is simultaneously more abstract but also more orthdoxly jazz-centred."

== Track listing ==
All compositions by Alexander von Schlippenbach.

1. "Any Piece, But A's Piece (1993)" – 10:28
2. "Contrareflection (1989)" – 7:06
3. "Rigaudon Nr. 2 Aus Der Wasserstoffmusik (1987)" – 12:03
4. "Marcia Di Saturno (1984)" – 12:54
5. "The Morlocks (1993)" – 16:00
6. "Jackhammer (1983)" – 10:32

== Personnel ==
- Alexander von Schlippenbach – piano, conductor
- Darcy Hepner – alto saxophone
- Claas Willecke – flute, baritone saxophone
- Tilman Denhard – flute, piccolo, tenor saxophone
- Walter Gauchel – tenor saxophone
- Evan Parker – tenor saxophone, soprano saxophone
- Axel Dörner – trumpet
- Henry Lowther – trumpet
- Thomas Heberer – trumpet
- Jörg Huke – trombone
- Marc Boukouya – trombone
- Sören Fischer – trombone
- Utz Zimmermann – trombone
- Aki Takase – piano, conductor
- Nobuyoshi Ino – double bass
- Paul Lovens – percussion
