= A-Trane =

Jazz club in Berlin, Germany

Coordinates: 52.5074°N 13.3201°E

A-Trane logo

The A-Trane is a jazz club in Berlin, Germany.

== Overview ==
The A-Trane was opened in late 1992. It is located in Berlin-Charlottenburg at Bleibtreustrasse 1 where its doors open every night at 9 pm. Uncounted locally and internationally renowned musicians have played the club, including Wynton Marsalis, Herbie Hancock, Lee Konitz, Brad Mehldau, Larry Coryell, Diana Krall, Esbjörn Svensson, James Carter, Detroit Gary Wiggins, Take 6 and Till Brönner. It is one of the venues of the annual JazzFest Berlin. Numerous live jazz albums have been recorded at the A-Trane. On Saturday nights after the regular show there is "Jazz after Midnight", the weekly jam session. The club can accommodate no more than 100 people that gather around the 12 square meter bandstand.

Since 1997, the club's owner and manager is the former designer/illustrator and professional basketball player Sedal Sardan, who regularly acts as MC. The club was named after John Coltrane (nicknamed "Trane") with a nod to the Billy Strayhorn standard "Take the A-Train" associated with Duke Ellington.

The A-Trane is widely considered one of Europe's most important jazz clubs and was honoured with the Live Entertainment Award (LEA) in the category "Best German Jazzclub" in April 2011.
