= Mário Laginha =

Portuguese pianist and composer (born 1960)

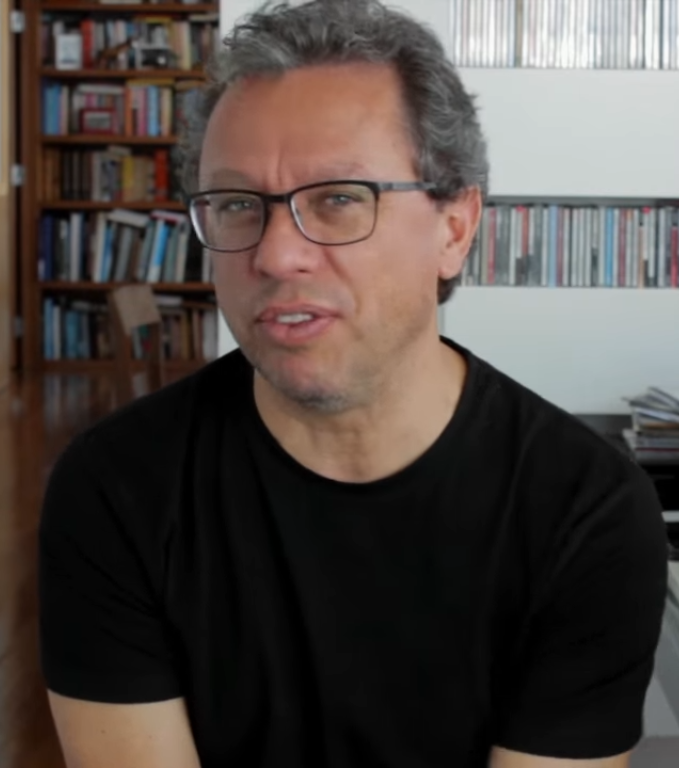
Mário Laginha

Mário João Laginha dos Santos, OIH (born April 25, 1960, in Lisbon), a pianist and composer, is one of the most well-known Portuguese jazz musicians today. He is mostly recognized for his collaborations with Portuguese jazz singer Maria João, with whom he recorded over a dozen albums and toured worldwide extensively. Other acknowledged collaboration work includes four-handed piano sessions with Bernardo Sassetti and Pedro Burmester.

Mário's main influence on piano is Keith Jarrett.

== Discography ==
His first solo record, "Canções e Fugas", went on sale in March 2006.

Previous recordings (most recent appear on top):

- Setembro (2017) (with Julian Argüelles and Helge Andreas Norbakken)
- Grândolas – Seis Canções e Dois Pianos nos Trinta Anos de Abril (2014) (with Bernardo Sassetti)
- Terra Seca (2013)
- Mongrel (2010)
- Chocolate (*) (2008)
- Espaço (2007)
- Tralha (*) (2004)
- Mário Laginha e Bernardo Sassetti (2003) (with Bernardo Sassetti)
- Undercovers (*) (2002)
- Mumadji (live) (*) (2001)
- Chorinho Feliz (*) (2000)
- Lobos, Raposas e Coiotes (*) (1999)
- Cor (*) (1998)
- Fábula (*) (1996)
- Danças (*) (1994)
- Duetos (1994)
- Hoje (1994)
- Sol (Cal Viva) (*) (1991)
- Cem Caminhos (1985)
- Quinteto Maria João (*) (1983)
- Ao Encontro (Sexteto de Jazz de Lisboa)

(*) – with Maria João
