= Maria João (singer) =

Portuguese jazz singer (born 1956)

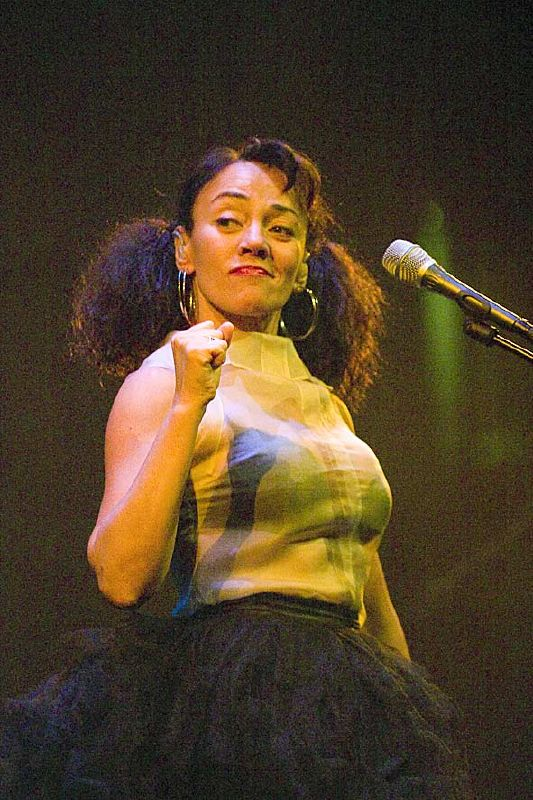

Background information
- Birth name: Maria João Monteiro Grancha
- Born: 27 June 1956 (age 69); Lisbon, Portugal
- Genres: Jazz, world, avant-garde, electronica
- Occupation: Singer
- Years active: 1983–present
- Labels: Universal
- Website: mariajoao.org

Maria João Monteiro Grancha (born 27 June 1956) is a Portuguese jazz singer. She is known for her vocal flexibility and improvisational skills. Although considered a jazz singer, she incorporates folk music, avant-garde, and electronica.

Her main musical partner is Portuguese pianist Mário Laginha. She has also worked with Aki Takase, Bobby McFerrin, David Linx, Dino Saluzzi, Gilberto Gil, Joe Zawinul, Kai Eckhardt, Lenine, Manu Katche, Ralph Towner, Trilok Gurtu, Wolfgang Muthspiel, and OGRE.

She was invited by RTP to compose an entry for Festival da Canção 2024, the Portuguese selection for the Eurovision Song Contest 2024; she performed the song "Dia" in the second semi-final on 2 March 2024, failing to qualify for the final.

== Discography ==
- Quinteto Maria João (Orfeu (Pt), 1983), with Mário Laginha
- Cem Caminhos with Maria João Quintet (Orfeu/Nabel (G), 1985)
- Conversa with Maria João Quintet (Nabel, 1986)
- Looking for Love with Aki Takase (Enja (G), 1988)
- Sol with Grupo Cal Viva (Enja, 1991)
- Alice with Aki Takase and Niels-Henning Ørsted Pedersen (Enja, 1992)
- Danças with Mário Laginha (Verve World, 1994)
- Fábula (Verve, 1996), with Dino Saluzzi, Ralph Towner, Manu Katché a.o.
- Cor with Mário Laginha, Trilok Gurtu and Wolfgang Muthspiel (Verve, 1998)
- Lobos, Raposas e Coiotes with Mário Laginha and NDR Radio Philharmonic Orchestra Hannover and Arild Remmereit (PolyGram (Pt)/Verve, 1999)
- Chorinho Feliz with Mário Laginha (Universal (Pt)/Verve, 2000)
- Mumadji with Mário Laginha, Toninho Ferragutti and Helge Norbakken as Mumadji (EmArcy, 2001)
- Undercovers with Mário Laginha (Universal (Pt)/Verve, 2002)
- Tralha (2004)
- Pele with José Peixoto (Zona Música (Pt), 2006)
- João (Universal (Pt), 2007), also released with additional DVD
- Chocolate (2008)
- Follow the Songlines with David Linx, Diederik Wissels, Mário Laginha (Naïve, 2010)
- Amoras e Framboesas (2011)
- A Different Porgy & Another Bess (2012)
- Electrodoméstico (2012)
- Iridescente (2012)
- Plástico with Ogre (Espuma Preta (Pt), 2015)
- Mar Afora with Guinga (Acoustic Music (G), 2015)
- Studio Konzert with Ogre (Neuklang (G), 2017)
- A Poesia de Aldir Blanc (Selo Sesc (Br), 2017)
- The Blues Experience with Budda Power Blues (Mobydick (Pt), 2017)
- Agora Muda Tudo (Now Everything Changes) with Nuno Côrte-Real, José Luís Peixoto, Ensemble Darcos (Odradek (Cz), 2018)
- Open Your Mouth with Ogre Electric (2020)

=== Compilations ===
- Pensa Nisto! (1996) – Fidjo Magoado
- Etnocity/Underground Sound of Lisbon (2000) – Saris e Capolanas (Remix) (MJML)
- Movimentos Perpétuos (2003)– Mãos na Parede (MJML)

=== As featured vocalist ===
- ABBAcadabra (1984)
- Júlio Pereira (1990)
- LX-90 – Uma Revolução Por Minuto/One Revolution Per Minute (BMG Ariola (Pt), 1992)
- NDR Bigband – Bravissimo II - 50 Years (ACT, 1998) with João on one track recorded 1993
- Júlio Pereira – Tarde Quente (1994)
- Laurent Filipe – Ad lib(itum) Vol. 1 (Movieplay (Pt), 1995)
- Bom dia Benjamim, children's musical audiobook (Movieplay (Pt), 1995)
- António Pinho Vargas with Maria João & José Nogueira – A Luz e a Escuridão (EMI (Pt), 1996)
- Carlos Bica, Frank Möbus, Jim Black – Azul (EmArcy, 1996)
- Cantigas de Amigos – São Macaio/A Garrafa (1998)
- Clã - Pois (1998)
- Dulce Pontes – Modinha das Saias (1999)
- Bana (1999)
- Jorge Palma – Acto Contínuo (Mercury/Universal (Pt), 2001)
- Joe Zawinul – Faces & Places (ESC, 2002), João on one track
- Carinhoso – Ingénuo (2002)
- Simentera – Lua Cheia (2003)
- Pirilampo Mágico (with Mariza e Teresa Salgueiro) – Faz a Magia Voar (2003)
- DEP – Esquece Tudo O Que Aprendeste (Universal (Pt)/EmArcy, 2004)
- Danças Ocultas (2004)
- Saxofour – European Christmas (EmArcy, 2004)
- Saxofour – Cinco (EmArcy, 2005)
- Teresa Salgueiro – Obrigado (EMI, 2005), João on two tracks
- Blasted Mechanism – Avatara (2005), João on one track
- Clã – Vivo (EMI (Pt), 2005), João on one track
- D'Herbe Foundation – Inner Face (Free (Pt), 2006), João on two tracks
- Lucía Martínez Cuarteto – Soños e Delirios (Nuba (Es), 2008), João on one track
- Jan Gunnar Hoff – Magma (Grappa (Nw), 2008)
- Vera e os Seus Amigos – Papagaio Fofoca (2008)
- Ogre – Electrodoméstico (JACC (Pt), 2012), João on one track
- Guinga – Porto da Madama with Esperanza Spalding, Maria Pia e Vito and Mônica Salmaso (Selo Sesc (Br), 2015)
- David Helbock´s Austrian Syndicate (ACT, 2023) on track "Komm, lieber Mai und Mache"
