= Aardvark Jazz Orchestra =

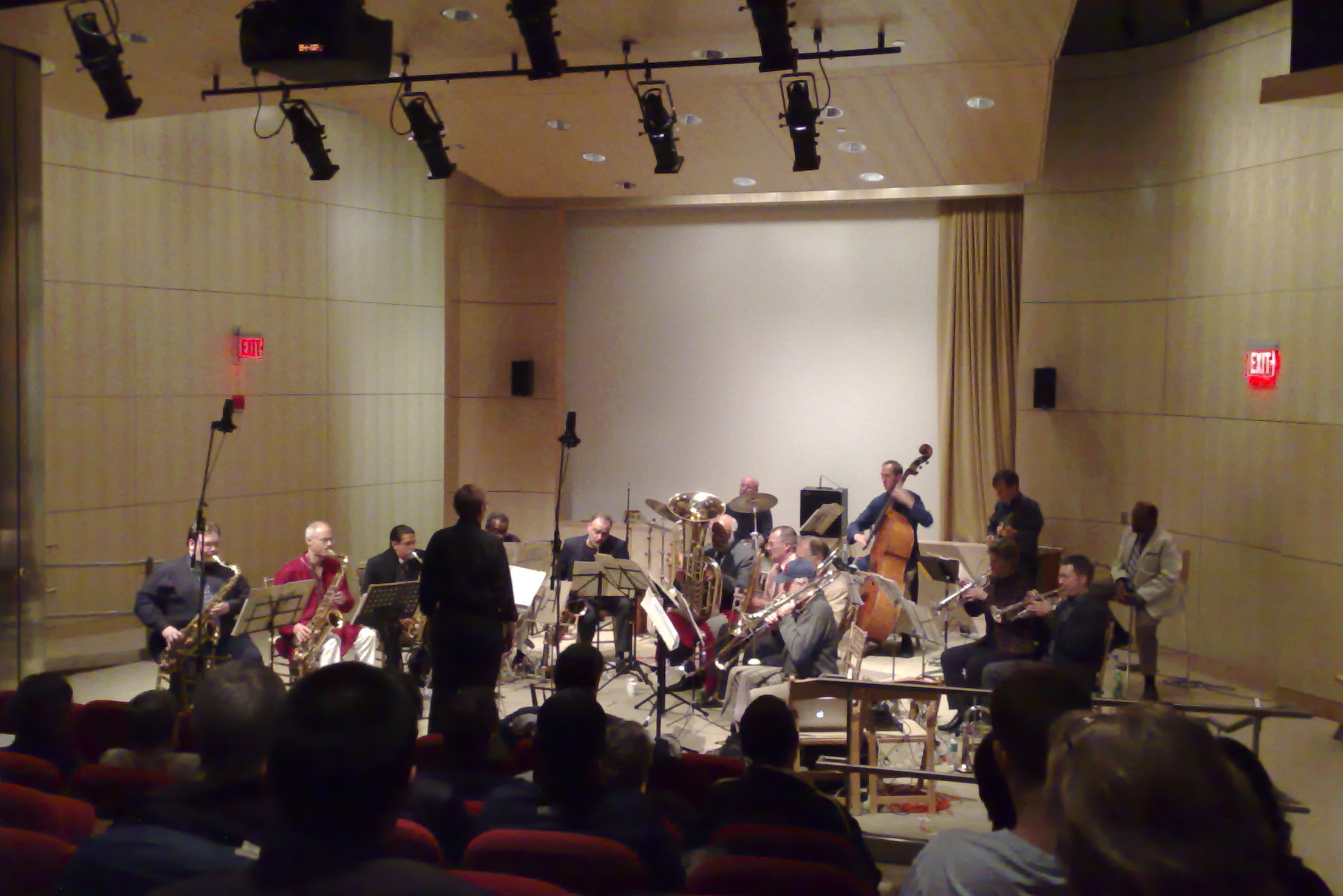
The Aardvark Jazz Orchestra in concert in Cambridge, MA in 2007.

Aardvark Jazz Orchestra is an eclectic big band founded in 1973 by bandleader and trumpeter Mark Harvey. The orchestra plays music from across the jazz tradition with specialties in Ellingtonia and the original postmodern compositions of music director Mark Harvey. The group has won various awards, including one for Jazz Song at The 1st Annual Independent Music Awards ("Scamology"), and has released at least eight albums since 1993.

== Musicians ==
For Aardvark's 2018 Christmas concert, the musicians performing were:

=== Sax/Woodwinds ===
- Arni Cheatham
- Peter H. Bloom
- Phil Scarff
- Chris Rakowski
- Dan Zupan

=== Trumpets ===
- K.C. Dunbar
- Jeanne Snodgrass
- Mark Harvey

=== Trombones & Tuba ===
- Bob Pilkington
- Jay Keyser
- Jeff Marsanskis
- Bill Lowe

=== Rhythm ===
- Richard Nelson - Guitar
- John Funkhouser - Bass, Piano
- Harry Wellott - Drums

=== Vocals ===
- Grace Hughes
- Jerry Edwards

== Discography ==
- Aardvark Steps Out (1993, Nine Winds)
- Paintings for Jazz Orchestra (1995, Leo Lab)
- An Aardvark Christmas (1997, Nine Winds)
- Psalms & Elegies (1997, Leo)
- The Seeker (2000, Leo)
- Duke Ellington/Sacred Music (2003, Aardmuse)
- Bethlehem Counterpoint (2003, Aardmuse)
- Trumpet Madness (2005, Leo)
- No Walls/A Christmas Concert (2007, Aardmuse)

== See also ==
- List of experimental big bands
