= Piano Duets: Live in Berlin 93/94 =

Live album by Aki Takase, Alexander von Schlippenbach
- Recorded: 13 March 1993, 9 December 1994
- Genre: Jazz
- Label: FMP
- Producer: Aki Takase, Alexander von Schlippenbach

Piano Duets: Live in Berlin 93/94 is an album by Aki Takase and Alexander von Schlippenbach.

== Recording and music ==
The performances are by pianists Aki Takase and Alexander von Schlippenbach, who also produced the album. The first three tracks on the album were recorded at the Gethsemane-Kirche in Berlin, on 13 March 1993. The other tracks were recorded at DeutschlandRadio, Studio 10, also in Berlin, on 9 December 1994. "The Morlocks" and "Chapelure Japonaise" are played on prepared piano.

== Release and reception ==
Professional ratings
Review scores
Source	Rating
AllMusic	5/5 stars
The Penguin Guide to Jazz	3.5/4 stars

Piano Duets: Live in Berlin 93/94 was released by FMP. In a five-star review, AllMusic stated that "There is no jazz, no rock, no free improv, no classical, no blues, or new; all these distinctions lose their meaning the beginning this duo commences playing here. What is left is music, a sonorous organization of vibration in the air. [...] The listener is left literally breathless, unable to relax yet unable to move, except maybe toward the stereo to hit 'repeat'."

== Track listing ==
1. "Na, Na, Na, Na... ist das der Weg?" (Alexander von Schlippenbach) – 11:40
2. "The Morlocks" (Schlippenbach) – 11:29
3. "You Are What You Is" (Frank Zappa) – 5:41
4. "Mysterioso (Thelonious Monk) – 4:01
5. "Ask Me Now" (Monk) – 2:18
6. "Pannonica" (Monk) – 1:32
7. "Evidence" (Monk) – 5:52
8. "Tales of Something" (Aki Takase) – 8:50
9. "Chapelure Japonaise" (Takase) – 10:23

== Personnel ==
- Aki Takase – piano
- Alexander von Schlippenbach – piano
