= Aki Takase =

Japanese jazz pianist and composer (born 1948)

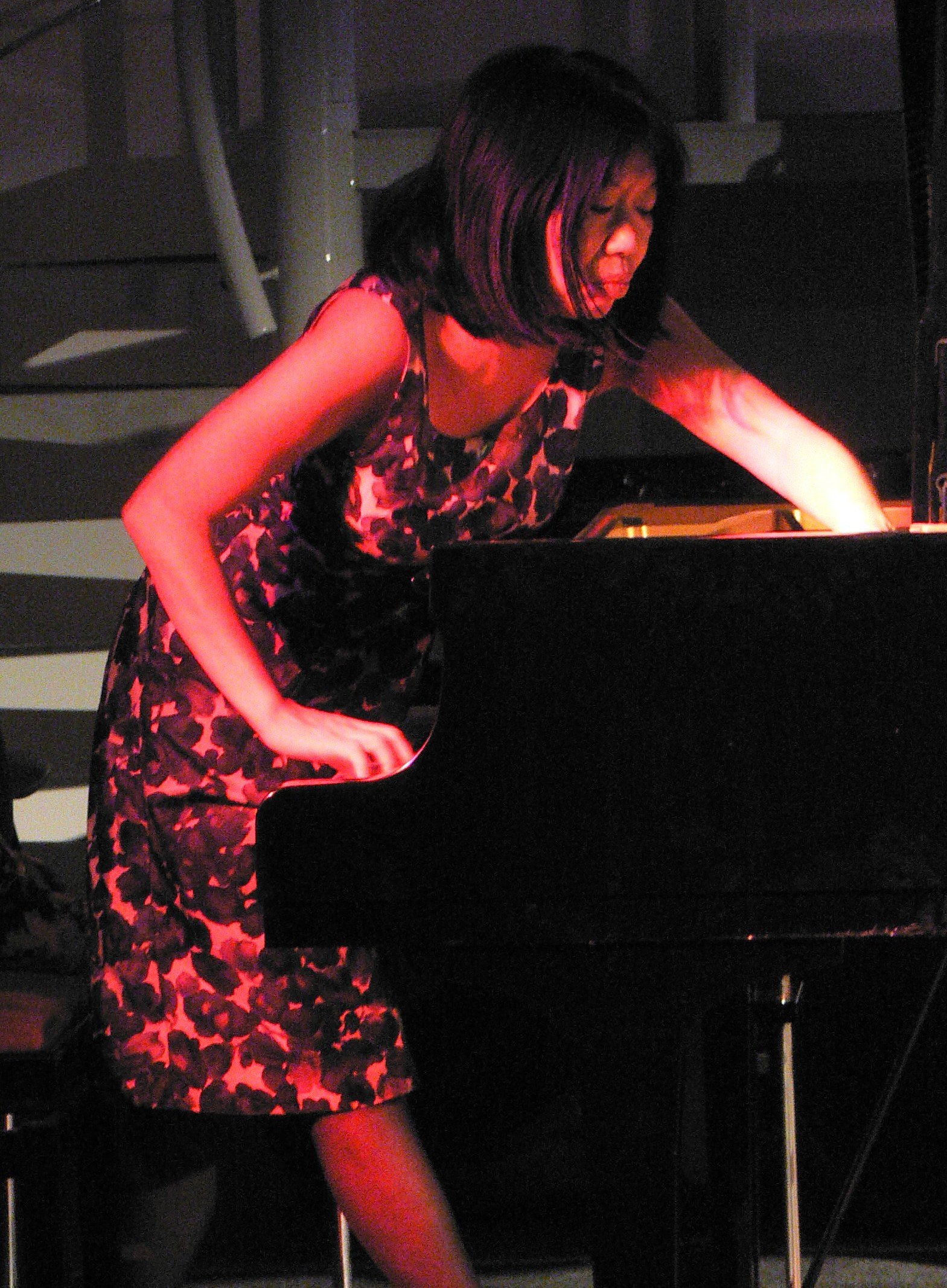
- Aki Takase in June 2008

Background information
- Born: January 26, 1948 (age 78); Osaka, Japan
- Origin: Tokyo, Japan
- Genres: Jazz, Avant-garde jazz, Free jazz, Free improvisation
- Occupations: Musician, composer
- Instrument: Piano
- Years active: 1978–present
- Formerly of: Berlin Contemporary Jazz Orchestra
- Website: akitakase.de

Aki Takase (高瀬 アキ) (born January 26, 1948) is a Japanese jazz pianist and composer.

== Biography ==
Takase was born in Osaka and started to play piano at age 3. Raised in Tokyo, she studied classical piano at Toho Gakuen School of Music. Starting in 1978, Takase began performing and recording in the US. Her collaborators have included Lester Bowie, Sheila Jordan, David Liebman, and John Zorn. Her first European appearance was in 1981 at the Berlin Jazz Festival in Germany. Through her constant touring and appearances at international jazz festivals, Takase quickly became one of the most sought-after musicians for recording and collaboration.

For many years, she has worked with her husband Alexander von Schlippenbach (also a pianist), as well as with Eugene Chadbourne, Han Bennink, Evan Parker, Paul Lovens, Fred Frith and many others, and in duets with Maria João, Louis Sclavis, David Murray and Rudi Mahall.

In various projects, Takase has dealt with the respective oeuvres of numerous famous jazz musicians, including the works of Duke Ellington (1990), Thelonious Monk (1994), Eric Dolphy (1998), W.C. Handy (2002), Fats Waller (2004), and Ornette Coleman (2006). Given her training and adventurous spirit, Takase's new projects exist as a genre between contemporary music and jazz. These include her project YOKOHAMA (Intakt 2009) with Louis Sclavis, KANON (doubtmusic 2011) with Kazuhisa Uchihashi and Axel Dörner or "Hotel Zauberberg" with Ayumi Paul in 2014 (Intakt Records).

LA PLANETE w/ Louis Sclavis, Vincent Courtois, Dominique Pifarely. LOK.03 w/ Alex v. Schlippenbach and DJIIIVibe. „TAMA“ w/ Jan Roder, Oliver Steidle.“ „Reading and Music“ performance w/ Yoko Tawada . With her quintett JAPANIC (26. April 2019/ BMC) Aki Takase brings together Contemporary Jazz and Improvisations.“ AUGE“ w/ Christian Weber and Michael Griener. Cities in the Piano : dance +piano w / Yui Kawaguchi. 2023 Carmen Rhapsody] with Mayumi Nakamura, Daniel Erdmann. Vincent Courtois. The CD was published in February by BMC Records. 2023 AAPD Duo with Alexander von Schlippenbach Four Hands Piano Pieces The CD and LP were published in May by Trost Records. 2024 Duo ELLINGTON with Daniel Erdmann was published in March by enja Records. 2024 Japanic FORTE was published in April by BMC Records with Daniel Erdmann, DJlllvibe, Carlos Bica, Dag Magnus Narvesen also as Guest with Nils Wogram and Alexander von Schlippenbach.

Since 1988, Takase has lived in Berlin.

Award: „Berliner Zeitung“Award (the best Artists of 1999 in the Berlin Newspaper) „The „SWR Jazz“ Award 2002. CD „Cherry-Sakura“ with David Murray „The German Record Critics „ Award(2017/2) „The German Record Critics‘ Award also In total she received the awards 9 times (1988–2017). “JAZZ PREIS BERLIN „ Award 2018. „German Jazz Preis“ for Piano/ keyboard Award 2021. „Albert-Mangelsdorff Preis“ Award 2021. „German Jazz Preis“ with Daniel Erdmann for Live Act of the year was nominated 2024.

== Discography ==
An asterisk (*) after the year indicates that it is the year of release.

=== As leader/co-leader ===
| Year recorded | Title | Label | Personnel/Notes |
|---|---|---|---|
| 1978 | Aki | King | Trio, with Nobuyoshi Ino (electric bass, cello), Takuji Kusumoto (drums, percussion) |
| 1981* | Minerva's Owl | Teichiku Union | Quartet, with Dave Liebman (tenor sax, soprano sax), Nobuyoshi Ino (bass), Motohiko Hino (drums) |
| 1981 | Esprit | Teichiku Union | One track solo piano; most tracks duo, with Yoshio Ikeda (bass) |
| 1981 | Song for Hope | Enja | Trio, with Nobuyoshi Ino (bass), Takeo Moriyama (drums); in concert |
| 1982 | ABC | Teichiku Union/East Wind | With Cecil McBee (bass), Bob Moses (drums), Sheila Jordan (vocals) |
| 1982 | Perdido | Enja | Solo piano and koto; in concert |
| 1985 | Teni Muho | Mobys | Duo, with Nobuyoshi Ino (bass, percussion) |
| 1987 | Looking for Love | Enja | Duo, with Maria João (vocals); in concert |
| 1990 | Shima Shoka | Enja | Solo piano |
| 1990 | Gunther Klatt & Aki Takase Play Ballads of Duke Ellington | Tutu | Duo, with Gunther Klatt (tenor sax) |
| 1991 | Blue Monk | Enja | Duo, with David Murray (tenor saxophone, bass clarinet) |
| 1992 | Close Up of Japan | Enja | With Nobuyoshi Ino (bass), Toki String Quartet |
| 1993 | Clapping Music | Enja | Trio, with Reggie Workman (bass), Sunny Murray (drums) |
| 1993–94 | Piano Duets: Live in Berlin 93/94 | FMP | Duo, with Alexander von Schlippenbach (piano); in concert |
| 1994 | Oriental Express | Omagatoki/Enja | Septet, with Hiroaki Katayama (baritone sax, tenor sax), Eiithi Hayashi (alto sax, soprano sax), Issei Igarashi (trumpet), Hiroshi Itaya (trombone), Nobuyoshi Ino (bass), Shota Koyama (drums) |
| 1997 | Duet for Eric Dolphy | Enja | Duo, with Rudi Mahall (bass clarinet, contrabass clarinet) |
| 1997 | Tarantella | Psi | Quintet, with Aleks Kolkowski (violin), Maurice Horsthuis (viola), Tristan Honsinger (cello), Nobuyoshi Ino (bass); released 2006 |
| 1997 | Valencia | | Duo, with David Murray (tenor saxophone, bass clarinet); in concert |
| 2001 | Le Cahier du Bal | Leo | Solo piano |
| 2001 | St Louis Blues | Enja | With Nils Wogram (trombone), Fred Frith (guitar), Rudi Mahall (bass clarinet), Paul Lovens (percussion) |
| 2001 | Nine Fragments | Leo | As DEMPA; trio, with Aleksander Kolkowski (violin, turntables, electronics), Tony Buck (drums, electronics) |
| 2002* | Diagonal | Sound Hills | Duo, with Yoko Tawada (vocals) |
| 2002 | News from Berlin | Victo | Duo, with Konrad Bauer (trombone) |
| 2003 | The Dessert | Leo | Duo, with Rudi Mahall (bass clarinet, contrabass clarinet) |
| 2003 | Plays Fats Waller | Enja | With Thomas Heberer (trumpet), Nils Wogram (trombone), Rudi Mahall (bass clarinet), Eugene Chadbourne (guitar, banjo, vocals), Paul Lovens (percussion) |
| 2004 | Plays Fats Waller in Berlin | jazzwerkstatt | With Thomas Heberer (trumpet), Rudi Mahall (bass clarinet), Eugene Chadbourne (guitar, banjo, vocals), Paul Lovens (percussion); in concert |
| 2004 | Procreation | Enja | Quintet, with Walter Gauchel (tenor sax, flute), Rudi Mahall (bass clarinet), Johannes Fink (bass), Heinrich Köbberling (drums) |
| 2004 | Lok 03 | Leo | With Alexander von Schlippenbach (piano), DJ Illvibe (samples, turntables) |
| 2004 | Spring in Bangkok | Intakt | Duo, with Lauren Newton (vocals) |
| 2006 | Ornette Coleman Anthology | Intakt | Duo, with Silke Eberhard (alto sax, clarinet, bass clarinet) |
| 2007* | Tenimuhou | | Duo, with Nobuyoshi Ino (bass, percussion) |
| 2007 | Something Sweet, Something Tender | Enja | Solo piano |
| 2011 | Beauty Is the Thing | Doubtmusic | As Kanon; trio, with Axel Dörner (trumpet), Kazuhisa Ushihashi (guitar) |
| 2008 | Live at Willisau Jazz Festival | jazzwerkstatt | Quintet, with Tobias Delius (tenor sax, clarinet), Rudi Mahall (bass clarinet), Johannes Fink (bass), Heinrich Köbberling (drums); in concert |
| 2008 | Iron Wedding | Intakt | Duo, with Alexander von Schlippenbach (piano) |
| 2008 | Evergreen | Intakt | With Rudi Mahall (bass clarinet) |
| 2008 | A Week Went By | Psi | Some tracks solo piano; one track duo, with John Tchicai (alto sax); some tracks trio, with John Edwards (double bass) and Tony Levin (drums); in concert |
| 2009 | Yokohama | Intakt | With Louis Sclavis (clarinet, bass clarinet, soprano saxophone) |
| 2009 | Rolled Up | jazzwerkstatt | As Tama; trio, with Jan Roder (bass), Oliver Steidle (drums) |
| 2011 | Two for Two | Intakt | Duo, with Han Bennink (drums) |
| 2011 | New Blues | Enja | Most tracks quintet, with Rudi Mahall (bass clarinet), Nils Wogram (trombone), Eugene Chadbourne (guitar, banjo, vocals), Paul Lovens (drums); one track with Alexander von Schlippenbach (trumpet) added |
| 2012 | My Ellington | Intakt | Solo piano |
| 2012 | Flying Soul | Intakt | Quartet, with Louis Sclavis (clarinet, bass clarinet), Dominique Pifarély (violin), Vincent Courtois (cello) |
| 2014 | So Long, Eric! | Intakt | With Tobias Delius (tenor sax), Henrik Walsdorff (alto sax), Axel Dörner (trumpet), Nils Wogram (trombone), Rudi Mahall (bass clarinet, clarinet), Alexander von Schlippenbach (piano), Karl Berger (vibraphone), Wilbert de Joode and Antonio Borghini (bass), Han Bennink and Heinrich Köbberling (drums); in concert |
| 2014 | Hotel Zauberberg | Intakt | Duo, with Ayumi Paul (violin) |
| 2017 | Cherry Sakura | Intakt | Duo, with David Murray |
| 2018* | DITZNERs Carte Blanche – Live At Enjoy Jazz 2017 | fixcel | With Silke Eberhard (alto sax, clarinet, bass clarinet), Sebastian Gramss (bass), Erwin Ditzner (drums) |
| 2019 | Thema Prima | BMC | With Japanic: Daniel Erdmann (saxophone), DJ Illvibe (turntables, electronics), Johannes Fink (bass), Dag Magnus Narvasen (drums) |
| 2021 | Isn't It Romantic? | BMC | Duo, with Daniel Erdmann |
| 2021 | AUGE | Intakt | Trio, with Christian Weber (bass), Michael Griener (drums) |
| 2023 | Carmen Rhapsody | BMC | With Mayumi Nakamura (voice), Daniel Erdmann(tenor sax, soprano sax), Vincent Courtois (cello) |
| 2023 | Four Hands Piano Pieces | Trost records | Duo, with Alexander von Schlippenbach |
| 2024 | Ellington | Enja | Duo, with Daniel Erdmann |
| 2024 | FORTE | BMC | Qunitet, with Daniel Erdmann (tenor sax, soprano sax), Vincent von Schlippenbach (turntable), Carlos Bica (bass), Dag Magnus Narvesen (drums) |

=== As sidewoman ===
| Year recorded | Leader | Title | Label |
|---|---|---|---|
| 1989 | Berlin Contemporary Jazz Orchestra | Berlin Contemporary Jazz Orchestra | ECM |
| 1993 | Berlin Contemporary Jazz Orchestra | The Morlocks and Other Pieces | FMP |
| 1996 | Berlin Contemporary Jazz Orchestra | Live in Japan '96 | DIW |
| 1990 | Maria João | Alice | Enja |
| 2007* | Various | Free Zone Appleby 2006 | Psi |
| 2007* | Various | Ich hebe meine Augen in die Welt | |
| 2007 | Sven-Åke Johansson | Für Paul Klee | jazzwerkstatt |

== Awards ==
- The German Record Critics' Award 1988, 1990, 1993, 1997, 2001, 2004, 2007, 2009, CD "Cherry-Sakura" with David Murray 2017/2. In total she received the awards 9 times (1988–2017).
- Berliner Zeitung Award (the best Artists of 1999 in the Berlin Newspaper)
- The SWR Jazz Award 2002.
- Jazzpreis Berlin, 2018
- German Jazz Preis for Piano/Keyboard Award 2021.
- Albert Mangelsdorff Prize 2021
