= Alexander von Schlippenbach =

German jazz pianist and composer (born 1938)

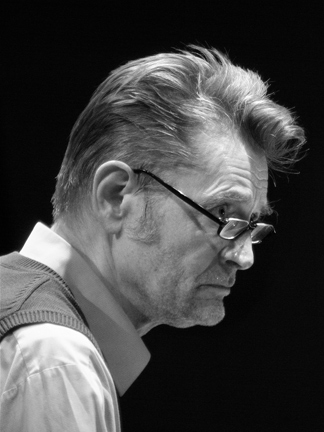
- von Schlippenbach in 2005

Background information
- Born: 7 April 1938 (age 88); Berlin, Germany
- Genres: Jazz, Avant-garde jazz, Free jazz, Free improvisation
- Occupation: Musician
- Instrument: Piano
- Years active: 1950s–present
- Website: avschlippenbach.com

Alexander von Schlippenbach (born 7 April 1938) is a German jazz pianist and composer. He came to prominence in the 1960s playing free jazz in a trio with saxophonist Evan Parker and drummer Paul Lovens, and as a member of the Globe Unity Orchestra. Since the 1980s, Von Schlippenbach has also explored the work of more traditional jazz composers such as Jelly Roll Morton or Thelonious Monk.

== Biography ==
Schlippenbach started to play piano from the age of eight and went on to study composition at Cologne under Bernd Alois Zimmermann. While studying he started to play with Manfred Schoof. At the age of 28 he founded the Globe Unity Orchestra. In 1988, he founded the Berlin Contemporary Jazz Orchestra, a big band that has over the years comprised, among others, Willem Breuker, Paul Lovens, Misha Mengelberg, Evan Parker, Schlippenbach's wife Aki Takase and Kenny Wheeler.

In 1994, he was awarded the Albert Mangelsdorff Prize.

Schlippenbach has produced various recordings and worked for German radio channels. He played with many players of the European free jazz community. In 2005, he recorded the complete works of Thelonious Monk, which were released on CD as Monk's Casino.

== Gallery ==
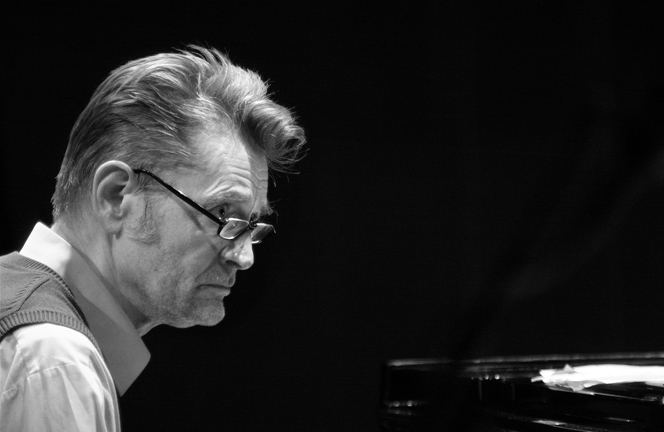

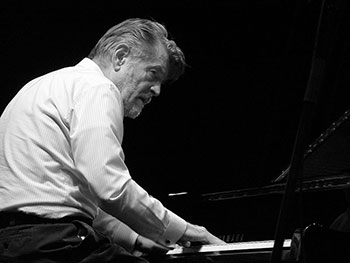

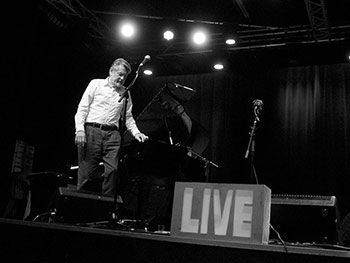

== Discography ==
=== As leader or co-leader ===
- Globe Unity (SABA, 1967)
- The Living Music (QUASAR, 1969)
- Payan (Enja, 1972)
- Pakistani Pomade (FMP, 1973)
- Three Nails Left (FMP, 1975)
- The Hidden Peak (FMP, 1977)
- Piano Solo (FMP, 1977)
- Rondo Brillante with Martin Theurer (FMP, 1983)
- Anticlockwise (FMP, 1983)
- Stranger Than Love with Paul Lovens, (Po Torch, 1985)
- Smoke with Sunny Murray, (FMP, 1990)
- Elf Bagatellen (FMP, 1990)
- Physics (FMP, 1993)
- Light Blue Schlippenbach Plays Monk (Enja, 1997)
- Tangens with Sam Rivers (FMP, 1998)
- Digger's Harvest with Tony Oxley (FMP, 1999)
- Complete Combustion (FMP, 1999)
- Hunting the Snake (Atavistic, 2000)
- Swinging the Bim (FMP, 2000)
- Compression (2002)
- Broomriding (Psi, 2003)
- Open Speech with Carlos Bechegas (Forward, 2004)
- Vesuvius with Paul Dunmall (Slam, 2005)
- Monk's Casino (Intakt, 2005)
- Winterreise (Psi, 2006)
- Twelve Tone Tales Vol. I (Intakt, 2006)
- Twelve Tone Tales Vol. II (Intakt, 2006)
- Dedalus with Daniele D'Agaro (Artesuono, 2007)
- Friulian Sketches (psi, 2008)
- Blackheath with Eddie Prevost (Matchless, 2008)
- Gold Is Where You Find It (Intakt, 2008)
- Bauhaus Dessau (Intakt, 2010)
- Berlin with G9 Gipfel (Jazzwerkstatt, 2010)
- Blue Hawk with Manfred Schoof (Jazzwerkstatt, 2011)
- Schlippenbach Plays Monk (Intakt, 2012)
- First Recordings (Trost, 2014)
- Features (Intakt, 2015)
- Warsaw Concert (Intakt, 2016)
- Jazz Now! (Intuition, 2016)
- So Far with Rudi Mahall (Relative Pitch, 2018)
- Interweaving with Dag Magnus Narvesen (Not Two, 2018)
- Liminal Field with Dag Magnus Narvesen (Not Two, 2019)

With Globe Unity Orchestra

- Live in Wuppertal (FMP, 1973)
- Der Alte Mann Bricht...Sein Schweigen (FMP, 1974)
- Bavarian Calypso & Good Bye (FMP, 1975)
- Into the Valley Vol. 2 (FMP, 1976)
- Evidence Vol. 1 (FMP, 1976)
- Jahrmarkt & Local Fair (Po Torch, 1977)
- Pearls (FMP, 1977)
- Improvisations (Japo, 1978)
- Hamburg '74 (FMP, 1979)
- Compositions (Japo, 1980)
- Intergalactic Blow (Japo, 1983)
- Rumbling (FMP, 1991)
- 20th Anniversary (FMP, 1993)
- Globe Unity 67 & 70 (Atavistic, 2001)
- Globe Unity 2002 (Intakt, 2003)
- Baden-Baden '75 (FMP, 2011)
- Globe Unity 40 Years (Intakt, 2007)
- Globe Unity 50 Years (Intakt, 2018)

With Sven-Ake Johansson

- Live at the Quartier Latin (FMP, 1976)
- Kung Bore (FMP, 1978)
- Drive (FMP, 1981)
- Kalfaktor A. Falke Und Andere Lieder (FMP, 1983)
- Blind Aber Hungrig Norddeutsche Gesange (FMP, 1986)

With Manfred Schoof

- Voices (CBS, 1966)
- Manfred Schoof Sextet (Wergo, 1967)
- European Echoes (FMP, 1969)
- The Early Quintet (FMP, 1978)

With Aki Takase

- Piano Duets: Live in Berlin 93/94 (FMP, 1995)
- Live at Café Amores (NoBusiness, 1995)
- Lok 03 (Leo, 2005)
- Iron Wedding: Piano Duets (Intakt, 2008)
- New Blues (Yellowbird, 2012)
- So Long, Eric! (Intakt, 2014)
- Signals (Trost, 2016)
- Live at Cafe Amores (NoBusiness, 2018)
- Hokusai Piano Solo (Intakt, 2019)

With the Berlin Contemporary Jazz Orchestra

- Berlin Contemporary Jazz Orchestra (ECM, 1990)
- The Morlocks and Other Pieces (FMP, 1994)
- Live in Japan '96 (DIW, 1997)

=== As sideman ===
With Peter Brotzmann

- Alarm (FMP, 1983)
- Up and Down (Olof Bright 2010)
- Peter Brotzmann/Alexander von Schlippenbach/Achim Trampenau (Carbon Edition, 2013)
- Fifty Years After (Trost, 2019)

With Evan Parker

- 50th Birthday Concert (Leo, 1994)
- 2X3=5 (Leo 2001)
- The Bishop's Move (Les Disques Victo, 2004)
- America 2003 (Psi, 2004)

With others

- Gunter Hampel, Heartplants (SABA, 1965)
- Gunter Hampel, Legendary (Birth 1998)
- Mario Schiano, Unlike (Splasc(H), 1990)
- Philipp Wachsmann, Free Zone Appleby, 2006 (Psi, 2007)
- Bernd Alois Zimmermann, Die Befristeten & Improvisationen Uber Die Oper Die Soldaten & Tratto (Wergo, 1967)
- Bernd Alois Zimmermann, Requiem fur Einen Jungen Dichter (Sony 1995)

== See also ==
- FMP (Free Music Production)
- Jazz in Germany
