= Jazz & Blues Award =

German jazz festival and award (2001–09)

Jazz & Blues Award was a jazz festival combined with award ceremonies which was held in Berlin, Germany, from 2001 to 2009. In September 2005, the two-day event organized by Jazzinitiative Berlin e.v. was held in the Kulturbrauerei's Palais with 67 registrations by jazz and blues bands. In 2009, the winner of the "Made in Germany" contest was the Marie Séfénan Quartet while the trio Crazy Hambones won the "Blues" award.
