= Naima (Eric Dolphy album) =

Studio album by Eric Dolphy
- Released: 1987
- Recorded: November 1960 and June 11, 1964
- Genre: Jazz
- Label: Jazzway / West Wind

Naima is an album by American musician Eric Dolphy, released in Europe in 1987 by the Jazzway label, and later by the West Wind label. Four of the five tracks were recorded on June 11, 1964, in a Paris studio for radio broadcast, nine days after the Hilversum session that yielded Last Date, and eighteen days before Dolphy's death. The remaining track, a duet with bassist Ron Carter, was recorded in New York City in November 1960, during a session which also produced three of the tracks released on Other Aspects.

The tracks recorded that day represent the last of Dolphy's commercially available recordings. Music from the same recording session was also issued on Unrealized Tapes, released in 1988, The Complete Last Recordings: In Hilversum & Paris 1964 (2010), and Paris '64 (2018).

== Background ==
In April 1964, Dolphy accompanied Charles Mingus and his band on a tour of Europe organized by George Wein. (Performances from this tour were documented on Revenge!, The Great Concert of Charles Mingus, Mingus in Europe Volume I, and Mingus in Europe Volume II.) Prior to leaving the U.S., however, Dolphy told Mingus that he intended to remain in Europe upon completion of the tour, rather than remaining with the band. Mingus and his group returned to the U.S. in early May, at which point Dolphy moved to Paris, at first staying with an old army friend, and intending to settle down with his fiancée, dancer Joyce Mordecai. During this time, Dolphy began playing at the Le Chat Qui Pêche club with trumpeter Donald Byrd and saxophonist Nathan Davis, both of whom appear on Naima. (Davis recalled that he'd "never been in a band that practiced as much as we practiced [with Dolphy]; we had daily rehearsals and played every night from 10 PM till 4 AM".)

Dolphy maintained a busy schedule over the next few months. On May 28, he made a recording in Paris for radio broadcast with a quartet that featured pianist Kenny Drew, bassist Guy Pedersen, and drummer Daniel Humair. These tracks were released on Humair's 1994 album Surrounded 1964-1987, as well as on The Complete Last Recordings: In Hilversum & Paris 1964. From May 29 - June 2, Dolphy visited Holland, where he performed with a variety of ensembles, including a big band, and where he recorded the music that would be released on the album Last Date. Back in Paris, during the remainder of June, he led a number of ensembles (including the one heard on Naima), and performed and recorded with Sonny Grey's big band and Jack Diéval's All Stars.

Immediately prior to his death in Berlin on June 29, Dolphy had been making extensive plans. He expressed an interest in reuniting with the musicians who performed on Last Date, and stated that he wanted to start a band with trumpeter Woody Shaw, bassist Richard Davis, and drummer Billy Higgins. He was also planning to join Albert Ayler's group, and was preparing himself to play with Cecil Taylor. In addition, he was writing a string quartet titled Love Suite.

The June 11 recordings are unique in that, prior to that day, Dolphy had not recorded with either Donald Byrd or Nathan Davis. In addition, Naima features the first recorded appearance of the Dolphy composition "Triple Mix", as well as Dolphy's first rendition of John Coltrane's ballad "Naima", for which the album is named, outside of the context of Coltrane's band. (Dolphy's first recording of Jaki Byard's "Ode To Charlie Parker" appeared on Far Cry. "G.W.", dedicated to bandleader Gerald Wilson, originally appeared on Outward Bound, while "Serene" originally appeared on Out There.)

== Reception ==
Professional ratings
Review scores
Source	Rating
AllMusic	4/5 stars
MusicHound Jazz	3.5/5 stars
The Penguin Guide to Jazz	2.5/4 stars
The Virgin Encyclopedia of Jazz	3/5 stars

In a review for AllMusic, Scott Yanow wrote: "this CD finds the great Eric Dolphy... in excellent form... Although joined by a fine French rhythm section, trumpeter Donald Byrd and Nathan Davis on tenor, Dolphy is easily the dominant voice throughout the spirited set, showing listeners that he still had a great deal to say even though his time had run out. This European import is worth searching for."

The authors of the Penguin Guide to Jazz Recordings commented: "There has been controversy in the past over some of West Wind's contractual idiosyncrasies, but this is the authentic article... More than just another pick-up band, the Champs Elysees All-Stars sound well versed in the Dolphy literature."

== Track listing ==
1. "Naima" (John Coltrane) – 15:12
2. "Triple Mix" (Eric Dolphy) – 8:20
3. "Ode To Charlie Parker" (Jaki Byard) – 5:28
4. "G.W." (Eric Dolphy) – 5:58
5. "Serene" (Eric Dolphy) – 7:38

Tracks, 1, 3, 4, and 5 recorded on June 11, 1964, in Paris. Track 2 recorded in November 1960 in New York City.

== Personnel ==
- Eric Dolphy – alto saxophone, bass clarinet, flute
- Nathan Davis – tenor saxophone (track 1)
- Sonny Grey – trumpet (tracks 3 and 5)
- Donald Byrd – trumpet (track 1)
- Jack Diéval – piano (tracks 3–5)
- Jacques B. Hess – bass (tracks 1, 3–5)
- Ron Carter – bass (track 2)
- Jacky Bambou – congas (tracks 1, 3–5)
- Franco Manzecchi – drums (1, 3–5)
