= Unrealized Tapes =

Studio album by Eric Dolphy
- Released: 1988
- Recorded: June 11, 1964
- Genre: Jazz
- Label: West Wind, DIW

Unrealized Tapes is an album by American musician Eric Dolphy, released in Europe in 1988 by the West Wind label, and in Japan with the title Last Recordings by the DIW label. The album was recorded on June 11, 1964 in a Paris studio for radio broadcast, nine days after the Hilversum session that yielded Last Date, and eighteen days before Dolphy's death.

The tracks recorded that day represent the last of Dolphy's commercially available recordings. Music from the same recording session was also issued on Naima, released in 1987, The Complete Last Recordings: In Hilversum & Paris 1964 (2010), and Paris '64 (2018).

== Background ==
In April 1964, Dolphy accompanied Charles Mingus and his band on a tour of Europe organized by George Wein. (Performances from this tour were documented on Revenge!, The Great Concert of Charles Mingus, Mingus in Europe Volume I, and Mingus in Europe Volume II.) Prior to leaving the U.S., however, Dolphy told Mingus that he intended to remain in Europe upon completion of the tour, rather than remaining with the band. Mingus and his group returned to the U.S. in early May, at which point Dolphy moved to Paris, at first staying with an old army friend, and intending to settle down with his fiancée, dancer Joyce Mordecai. During this time, Dolphy began playing at the Le Chat Qui Pêche club with trumpeter Donald Byrd and saxophonist Nathan Davis, both of whom appear on Unrealized Tapes. (Davis recalled that he'd "never been in a band that practiced as much as we practiced [with Dolphy]; we had daily rehearsals and played every night from 10 PM till 4 AM".)

Dolphy maintained a busy schedule over the next few months. On May 28, he made a recording in Paris for radio broadcast with a quartet that featured pianist Kenny Drew, bassist Guy Pederson, and drummer Daniel Humair. These tracks were released on Humair's 1994 album Surrounded 1964-1987, as well as on The Complete Last Recordings: In Hilversum & Paris 1964. From May 29 - June 2, Dolphy visited the Netherlands, where he performed with a variety of ensembles, including a big band, and where he recorded the music that would be released on the album Last Date. Back in Paris, during the remainder of June, he led a number of ensembles (including the one heard on Unrealized Tapes), and performed and recorded with Sonny Grey's big band and Jack Diéval's All Stars.

Immediately prior to his death in Berlin on June 29, Dolphy had been making extensive plans. He expressed an interest in reuniting with the musicians who performed on Last Date, and stated that he wanted to start a band with trumpeter Woody Shaw, bassist Richard Davis, and drummer Billy Higgins. He was also planning to join Albert Ayler's group, and was preparing himself to play with Cecil Taylor. In addition, he was writing a string quartet titled Love Suite.

The June 11 recordings are unique in that, prior to that day, Dolphy had not recorded with either Donald Byrd or Nathan Davis. In addition, Unrealized Tapes features the first recorded appearance of the Dolphy composition "Springtime". ("245", named after the number of Dolphy's residence on Carlton Avenue in Brooklyn's Fort Greene neighborhood during 1960, and "G.W.", dedicated to bandleader Gerald Wilson, both originally appeared on Outward Bound, while "Serene" originally appeared on Out There.)

== Reception ==
Professional ratings
Review scores
Source	Rating
AllMusic	4/5 stars
MusicHound Jazz	3.5/5 stars
The Penguin Guide to Jazz	2.5/4 stars

In a review for AllMusic, Scott Yanow wrote: "This LP... features the great Dolphy on alto and bass clarinet with a sextet that includes trumpeter Donald Byrd, tenor saxophonist Nathan Davis and a French rhythm section performing four of his compositions including the otherwise unknown 'Springtime.' Eric Dolphy collectors will have to get this gem."

The authors of the Penguin Guide to Jazz Recordings commented: "There has been controversy in the past over some of West Wind's contractual idiosyncrasies, but this is the authentic article... More than just another pick-up band, the Champs Elysees All-Stars sound well versed in the Dolphy literature. Davis and Byrd... blossom generously through... 'Springtime'... and on reworkings of two of Dolphy's most resilient compositions... the rhythm section plays more than adequately, and the Unrealized Tapes... make a welcome addition to the Dolphy catalogue."

== Track listing ==
All songs composed by Eric Dolphy.

1. "Springtime" – 19:20
2. "245" – 10:05
3. "GW" – 6:10
4. "Serene" – 7:58

Recorded on June 11, 1964 in Paris.

== Personnel ==
- Eric Dolphy – alto saxophone, bass clarinet
- Nathan Davis – tenor saxophone
- Donald Byrd – trumpet
- Jack Diéval – piano
- Jacques B. Hess – bass
- Jacky Bambou – congas
- Franco Manzecchi – drums
