= Eric Dolphy in Europe =

- Volume One cover

Live album by Eric Dolphy
- Released: 1964 and 1965
- Recorded: September 6 and 8, 1961
- Venue: Copenhagen, Denmark
- Genre: Jazz
- Label: Prestige Records; PR 7304; PR 7350; PR 7366

Volume Two cover

Eric Dolphy in Europe, Volumes 1, 2, and 3, is a trio of live albums by jazz multi-instrumentalist Eric Dolphy. The albums were recorded on September 6 and 8, 1961, in Copenhagen, Denmark, and were released on the Prestige label in 1964 (Vol. 1) and 1965 (Vols. 2 & 3). On the recordings, Dolphy is joined by three Danish musicians: pianist Bent Axen, bassist Erik Moseholm, and drummer Jorn Elniff. Bassist Chuck Israels, who was in Copenhagen with the Jerome Robbins ballet company, also appears on one track ("Hi-Fly", a flute and bass duet).

The albums were recorded during Dolphy's second trip to Europe, which also yielded the music released on The Berlin Concerts, The Complete Uppsala Concert, and Stockholm Sessions. Tracks from the Copenhagen dates were reissued on a number of additional recordings, including Copenhagen Concert (Prestige, 1973), The Complete Prestige Recordings (Prestige, 1995), and In Europe: The Complete Copenhagen Concerts (Essential Jazz Spain, 2012).

Volume Three cover

== Reception ==
Professional ratings
Review scores
Source	Rating
AllMusic: Volume 1	3/5 stars
AllMusic: Volume 2	3/5 stars
AllMusic: Volume 3	3/5 stars
The Penguin Guide to Jazz: Volume 1	3.5/4 stars
The Penguin Guide to Jazz: Volume 2	3/4 stars
The Penguin Guide to Jazz: Volume 3	3/4 stars
The Rolling Stone Jazz & Blues Album Guide: Volume 1	3.5/5 stars
The Rolling Stone Jazz & Blues Album Guide: Volume 2	3.5/5 stars
The Rolling Stone Jazz & Blues Album Guide: Volume 3	3.5/5 stars

AllMusic's Scott Yanow called Volume 1 "the strongest program of the trio," and commented: "Dolphy is in excellent form throughout the well-rounded release." Yanow stated that Volume 2 "has its share of fine music," and noted that "while the structures are generally boppish, Dolphy typically improvises in his own advanced vocabulary." He called Volume 3 "the weakest" of the three albums, writing: "overall this is one of the less essential Eric Dolphy releases."

The authors of the Penguin Guide to Jazz Recordings wrote: "The Danish players are certainly not even close to Dolphy's standard, and clearly they don't understand his more advanced ideas, but they are all decent, time-served players and, while some of their accompaniments are callow in the extreme, they don't really seem to affect the blissfully tolerant Dolphy all that much." They described "Laura" as "a tremendous alto performance," and called "Oleo" "one of the most effective bass clarinet outings documented to this point." Dolphy's solo performance of "God Bless the Child" was praised as his "definitive recording" of the piece, his "innate creativity suddenly freed from the constraints of playing down and breaking loose in an extraordinary outpouring of ideas."

== Set lists ==
- September 6, 1961, at Berlingske Hus, Copenhagen, Denmark
1. "Don't Blame Me" (2 takes)
2. "When Lights Are Low"
3. "Miss Ann" (2 takes)
- September 8, 1961, at Studenterforeningen Foredragssal, Copenhagen, Denmark
1. "Glad to Be Unhappy"
2. "Hi-Fly"
3. "God Bless the Child"
4. "Oleo"
5. "The Way You Look Tonight"
6. "Laura"
7. "Woody 'n' You"
8. "In the Blues" (4 takes, including one false start)
9. "Les"

== Track listings ==
=== Volume 1 ===
1. "Hi Fly" (Randy Weston) – 13:14
2. "Glad to Be Unhappy" (Richard Rodgers, Lorenz Hart) – 6:05
3. "God Bless the Child" (Arthur Herzog Jr., Billie Holiday) – 6:50
4. "Oleo" (Sonny Rollins) – 7:12

=== Volume 2 ===
1. "Don't Blame Me" (Jimmy McHugh, Dorothy Fields) – 11:30
2. "The Way You Look Tonight" (Jerome Kern, Dorothy Fields) – 9:35
3. "Les" (mistitled as "Miss Ann") (Eric Dolphy) – 5:30
4. "Laura" (David Raksin, Johnny Mercer) – 13:40

=== Volume 3 ===
1. "Woody 'n' You" (Dizzy Gillespie) – 10:20
2. "When Lights Are Low" (Benny Carter, Spencer Williams) – 12:10
3. "In the Blues (1-2-3)" (Eric Dolphy) – 17:30

== Personnel ==
- Eric Dolphy – alto saxophone, bass clarinet, flute
- Bent Axen – piano
- Chuck Israels – bass (Volume 1, track 1)
- Erik Moseholm – bass (Volume 1, tracks 2–4; Volumes 2 and 3)
- Jorn Elniff – drums
