= Franco Manzecchi =

Italian drummer

Manzecchi Franco
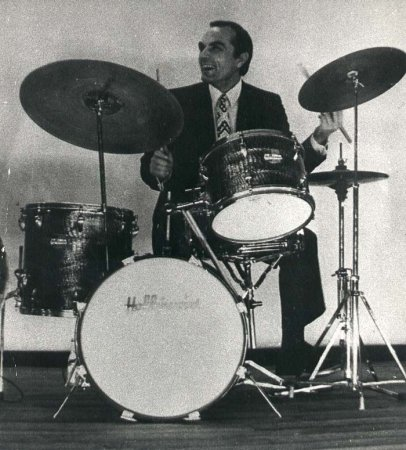

Background information
- Born: 1931; Ravenna, Italy

Franco (Gian) Manzecchi (September 10, 1931, Ravenna – March 25, 1979, Konstanz) was an Italian drummer.

== Biography ==
Manzecchi's older brother Gino was also a trumpeter and drummer. He moved from his hometown Ravenna, Italy, to Bologna, then to Vienna, Austria, and Saint Moritz, Switzerland, before he coincidentally went to Paris, France, in early 1957 and settled down there, playing with various ensembles. After a heart surgery in 1976 he had to partially quit music and retired to Lake Constance, Germany, with his German wife and son Patrick Manzecchi who is a renowned jazz drummer himself, before dying two years later. He is most famous for working and recording with Chet Baker, Eric Dolphy, Larry Young, Clark Terry, Bill Coleman, Lou Bennett, Mal Waldron and more.

== Discography ==
- Chet Baker, Brussels 1964 (Landscape, 1992)
- Nathan Davis, Live in Paris (Sam, 2018)
- Jack Dieval & Art Simmons, Ambiance Pour 2 Pianos Piano Duet (Polydor, 1966)
- Eric Dolphy, Naima (Jazzway, 1987)
- Eric Dolphy, Unrealized Tapes (West Wind, 1988)
- Andre Hodeir, Anna Livia Plurabelle (Philips, 1966)
- Eraldo Volonte, Free and Loose (Windsor, 1968)
- Clark Terry, At the Montreux Jazz Festival (Polydor, 1970)
- Patrice Galas/Marc Fosset/Franco Manzecchi, Organ (Open, 1978)
- Larry Young, In Paris (Resonance, 2016)
- Remembering René Thomas (Fresh Sound Records, 2020)
