= Caribe =

Caribe may refer to:

- Caribe (Venezuelan TV series), a Venezuelan telenovela
- Caribe (American TV series), a 1975 television series produced by Quinn Martin
- Caribe, or Cabir, a computer worm designed for mobile phones
- Caribe (1987 film), a 1987 drama film by director Michael Kennedy
- Caribe (2004 film), a 2004 Costa Rican film
- The Caribe, or Kalina, an Indigenous people of South America
- The Caribe, or Island Caribs, an Indigenous people of the Caribbean
- The Carib language, the language of the Kalina people
- A local term for piranhas, particularly in Venezuela
- Another name for the Carib language
- Caribé, an album by the Latin Jazz Quintet with Eric Dolphy
- Costa Caribe, a Nicaraguan basketball team

== See also ==
- Carib (disambiguation)
- Caribbean, a region of the Americas
