= Fire Waltz =

Composition by Mal Waldron

from the album The Quest
- Released: 1961
- Recorded: June 27, 1961; Englewood Cliffs, New Jersey, U.S.
- Genre: Jazz
- Label: Prestige
- Composer(s): Mal Waldron

"Fire Waltz" is a composition by Mal Waldron. The original version, by Waldron's sextet featuring Eric Dolphy and Booker Ervin, was recorded on June 27, 1961. It has become a jazz standard.

== Composition ==
Mal Waldron reported that he wrote the song the night before recording it. "Fire Waltz" is a 16-bar composition with the form AABA.

== Original recording ==
The composition was first recorded on June 27, 1961. The sextet contained Booker Ervin (tenor saxophone), Eric Dolphy (alto saxophone), Waldron (piano), Ron Carter (cello), Joe Benjamin (bass), and Charlie Persip (drums). It was released on Waldron's album The Quest.
