= Last Date (Eric Dolphy album) =

Live album by Eric Dolphy
- Released: 1965
- Recorded: June 2, 1964
- Genre: Jazz
- Labels: Limelight Records, Fontana

Eric Dolphy chronology
Out to Lunch! (1964)	Last Date (1965)	Here and There (1966)

Last Date is a live album by jazz musician Eric Dolphy released in early 1965 on Limelight Records. It was recorded on June 2, 1964 in Hilversum, North Holland, shortly after Dolphy had settled in Paris, France, following a tour with Charles Mingus. Dolphy is accompanied by the Misha Mengelberg trio on the album. (It was one of Mengelberg's first appearances on record). The audience was an invited group of recording executives and studio personnel.

The final track, "Miss Ann", is followed by a brief excerpt from an interview recorded by Michiel de Ruyter for Dutch radio, in which Dolphy states: "when you hear music, after it's over, it's gone in the air, you can never capture it again."

Following the recording, Dolphy wrote to the members of the trio concerning plans to work with them again. However, he died on June 29 from diabetic shock. Two days after Dolphy's death, drummer Han Bennink received a letter from him containing details regarding a proposed engagement at the Café Montmartre in Copenhagen.

Despite its title, Last Date was not Dolphy's last recorded performance, as he participated in sessions with Donald Byrd, Nathan Davis, and other musicians in mid-June 1964. These recordings were issued on Naima, released in 1987, Unrealized Tapes (1988), Last Recordings (1999), The Complete Last Recordings: In Hilversum & Paris 1964 (2010), and Paris '64 (2018).

Ten years after the recording of Last Date, while cleaning his apartment, Mengelberg found a rehearsal tape containing a recording of an 18-minute runthrough of "Epistrophy" at Cafe de Kroon, Eindhoven, Netherlands from the day before the concert. Mengelberg sent the tape to Bennink, along with a letter requesting that he release it on the Instant Composers Pool label. The track was issued on LP by ICP in 1975, backed by a recording of Mengelberg playing a duet with his parrot, Eeko.

Last Date was the inspiration for the 1991 Dolphy documentary of the same name, directed by Hans Hylkema, written by Hylkema and Thierry Bruneau, and produced by Akka Volta. The film includes video clips from Dolphy's TV appearances, plus interviews with the members of the Mengelberg trio as well as Jaki Byard, Buddy Collette, Ted Curson, Richard Davis, Roy Porter, Gunther Schuller, and Dolphy's fiancé Joyce Mordecai.

== Reception ==
Professional ratings
Review scores
Source	Rating
AllMusic	4/5 stars
Down Beat	5/5 stars
The Rolling Stone Jazz Record Guide	4/5 stars
The Penguin Guide to Jazz Recordings	3/4 stars

Dolphy biographers Vladimir Simosko and Barry Tepperman called Last Date "a vital set of performances." In a review for AllMusic, Michael G. Nastos wrote: "Last Date is one of those legendary albums whose reputation grows with every passing year, and deservedly so... it also marks the passing of one era and the beginning of what has become a most potent and enduring legacy of European creative improvised tradition, started by Mengelberg and Bennink at this mid-'60s juncture." He stated that Mengelberg's trio were "performers who understand the ways in which [Dolphy] modified music in such a unique, passionate, and purposeful way far from convention", "a group who understood his off-kilter, pretzel logic concept in shaping melodies and harmonies," and wrote that they "played so convincingly and with the utmost courage that they created a final stand in the development of how the woodwindist conceived of jazz like no one else before, during, or after his life."

The authors of the Penguin Guide to Jazz Recordings wrote: "the performances are very good indeed and Misha Mengelberg's trio plays sympathetically... There is much of Dolphy that can never be recaptured, which is what makes that which survives so precious."

== Track listing ==
All compositions by Eric Dolphy except where noted.

Side 1

1. "Epistrophy" (Monk) – 11:15
2. "South Street Exit" – 7:10
3. "The Madrig Speaks, the Panther Walks" – 4:50 (also known as "Mandrake")

Side 2

1. "Hypochristmutreefuzz" (Mengelberg) – 5:25
2. "You Don’t Know What Love Is" (Raye/De Paul) – 11:20
3. "Miss Ann" – 5:25

== Personnel ==
- Eric Dolphy – bass clarinet (on "Epistroph" and "Hypochristmutreefuzz"), flute (on "South Street Exit" and "You don't know what Love is", alto saxophone (on "The Madrig Speaks, the Panther Walks" and "Miss Ann")
- Misha Mengelberg – piano
- Jacques Schols – double bass
- Han Bennink – drums
