= Out to Lunch! =

Studio album by Eric Dolphy
- Released: August 1964
- Recorded: February 25, 1964
- Studio: Van Gelder Studio (Englewood Cliffs, New Jersey)
- Genre: Avant-garde jazz
- Length: 42:31
- Label: Blue Note
- Producer: Alfred Lion

Eric Dolphy chronology
Conversations (1963)	Out to Lunch! (1964)	Last Date (1965)

Out to Lunch! is a 1964 album by the American jazz multi-instrumentalist Eric Dolphy. His only recording on Blue Note Records as a leader, it was issued posthumously as BLP 4163 and BST 84163. Featuring Dolphy in a quintet with trumpeter Freddie Hubbard, vibraphonist Bobby Hutcherson, bassist Richard Davis, and drummer Tony Williams, it is considered by critics as one of the finest albums issued on Blue Note and one of the high points of 1960s avant-garde jazz. Reid Miles' cover artwork features a photo of a "Will Be Back" sign displayed in a shop window showing a seven-handed clock.

== Background ==
Dolphy declared in the album's liner notes that "Everyone's a leader in this session", and he was fortunate to be joined by four sympathetic musicians, three of whom had previously performed and recorded with him. Freddie Hubbard had roomed with Dolphy when they both first arrived in New York, and was featured on Outward Bound (1960), Dolphy's debut as a leader. Dolphy and Hubbard had also appeared together on Ornette Coleman's 1961 album Free Jazz. Bobby Hutcherson had participated in the July 1963 recording sessions that produced Dolphy's albums Iron Man and Conversations. Dolphy expressed his excitement regarding the opportunity to work with Hutcherson again: "Bobby's vibes have a freer, more open sound than a piano. Pianos seem to control you, Bobby's vibes seems to open you up."

Bassist Richard Davis had also participated in the July 1963 sessions, during which he recorded three duets with Dolphy ("Come Sunday", "Ode to Charlie Parker", and "Alone Together"). Davis was also the bassist on Dolphy and Booker Little’s dates at the Five Spot in 1961. One reviewer stated that the pair "had one of the more meaningful connections in jazz; they communicated almost telepathically, as if completing each other's thoughts." Dolphy commented that "Richard doesn't play the usual bass lines. He plays rhythm with his lines. He leads you somewhere else." Drummer Tony Williams, credited as "Anthony Williams" on the album, had joined Miles Davis' "second great quintet" in May 1963, and turned eighteen only in December of that year. Regarding Williams, Dolphy stated that he "doesn't play time, he plays pulse." Dolphy biographers Vladimir Simosko and Barry Tepperman praised the musical chemistry of this group, observing that "the other musicians match and support [Dolphy's] conception with a truly fantastic sense of freedom and interplay."

Roughly a month after the Out to Lunch! session, Dolphy, Davis, and Williams participated in the recording of Andrew Hill's Point of Departure. Shortly afterwards, he moved to Europe following the completion of a European tour with Charles Mingus: "Why? Because I can get more work there playing my own music, and because if you try to do anything different in this country, people put you down for it." Dolphy died from a diabetic coma in West Berlin on June 29, 1964, at the age of 36.

== Music ==
The title of the album's first track, "Hat and Beard", refers to Thelonious Monk, about whom Dolphy stated: "He's so musical no matter what he's doing, even if he's just walking around." The piece features wild bass clarinet playing, and contains a percussive interlude featuring Williams and Hutcherson. "Something Sweet, Something Tender" also features Dolphy on bass clarinet, and includes a scored duet between Dolphy and Davis on bowed bass. Dolphy commented that "The group got just the lyrical feeling that I wanted, and, taking it out, Richard and I really got together in the unison duet." The third composition, "Gazzelloni", which showcases some of Dolphy's most advanced flute work, is named for classical flautist Severino Gazzelloni, under whom Dolphy had studied the instrument. This track features the album's most conventional bebop-based theme; Dolphy noted that "Everybody holds to the construction for the first 13 bars, then - freedom."

The second side features two long pieces with Dolphy on alto saxophone. On the title track, the pulse is implied rather than being stated explicitly, which lends a sense of freedom. Dolphy commented: "Even though the rhythm section breaks the time up, there's a basic pulse coming from inside the tune. That's the pulse the musicians have to play." The final track, "Straight Up and Down", was intended to evoke a drunken stagger. Dolphy's solo contains swaggering, voice-like lines on which he employs multiphonics and smears. Regarding the group's contribution, he stated: "It gasses me that everyone was so free. I wanted a free date to begin with. All rhythm sections are different, but this one was really open..."

In late 2013, previously unissued alternate takes of the first two tracks were released on Toshiba EMI in Japan (catalog number TYCJ-81013).

== Critical reception ==
Professional ratings
Review scores
Source	Rating
AllMusic	5/5 stars
The Encyclopedia of Popular Music	5/5 stars
The Penguin Guide to Jazz Recordings	4/4 stars
The Rolling Stone Jazz Record Guide	5/5 stars

The Penguin Guide to Jazz selected Out to Lunch! as part of its suggested "Core Collection" and awarded it a perfect score and "crown", deeming it "a slightly tentative masterpiece." The album was identified by Chris Kelsey in his AllMusic essay "Free Jazz: A Subjective History" as one of the "20 Essential Free Jazz Albums".

Writer Martin Williams stated that on Out to Lunch!, "we hear a full development of [Dolphy's] talent, in its five, finely crafted compositions, and in his equally well-conceived solos." In a review for AllMusic, Steve Huey described the album as Dolphy's "magnum opus, an absolute pinnacle of avant-garde jazz in any form or era. Its rhythmic complexity was perhaps unrivaled since Dave Brubeck's Time Out, and its five Dolphy originals...were a perfect balance of structured frameworks, carefully calibrated timbres, and generous individual freedom." Writing for The Wire, Brian Morton described Out to Lunch! as "Dolphy's most adventurous album and his most self consistent attempt at freedom within some, at least of the confines established by bop writing." Morton deemed the bandleader "an instant composer rather than a strict improviser."

Kevin Whitehead, writing for NPR, referred to Out to Lunch! as Dolphy's "masterpiece", stating: "Half a century later it still sounds crazy in a good way. The organized mayhem starts with Dolphy's tunes, often featuring wide, wide leaps in the melody and ratchet-gear rhythms...in time you could hear its influence in Anthony Braxton's or Roscoe Mitchell's zigzag solos and odd timbres, in David Murray's yawping bass clarinet and Jason Adasiewicz's clanking vibes. You can also hear it in ambitious music by all sorts of modern composers who grapple with the same kind of contradictions Dolphy did." In an essay for Jazz History Online, Thomas Cunniffe wrote that Out to Lunch! "was an effort to break our expectations about the very nature of jazz", and stated that "In addition to dispelling the notion that improvised solos should maintain the mood of the melody, Dolphy called for his sidemen to rethink their preconceived notions about improvisation", noting that "Dolphy and company re-examined the very framework of this music."

Trevor Maclaren described Out to Lunch! as "one of the finest records of its kind" and "easily at the caliber of A Love Supreme and The Shape of Jazz to Come". He stated that "Dolphy shows himself as solid bandleader and arranger who opens up plenty of room for his players. Much in the ideology of his fellow avant-garde players, the solos exude experiment. Yet Dolphy's control is masterful and no matter how far out he gets, you can feel his passion and know his path has been well articulated." Greg Simmons of All About Jazz called the album "undeniably brilliant" and "an essential watershed in the jazz canon, representing a creative peak for the soon-to-be-gone Dolphy". He praised Dolphy's bass clarinet playing on the opening track as "as complete a statement of musical independence—from fashion, commercial concerns, and tradition—as is likely to be found."

== Track listing ==
All compositions by Eric Dolphy.

1. "Hat and Beard" – 8:24
2. "Something Sweet, Something Tender" – 6:02
3. "Gazzelloni" – 7:22
4. "Out to Lunch" – 12:06
5. "Straight Up and Down" – 8:19

Bonus tracks on 2013 Japanese limited SHM-CD:

1. "Hat and Beard (alternate take)" – 8:35
2. "Something Sweet, Something Tender (alternate take)" – 5:42

== Personnel ==
- Eric Dolphy – bass clarinet (tracks 1–2), flute (track 3), alto saxophone (tracks 4–5)
- Freddie Hubbard – trumpet
- Bobby Hutcherson – vibraphone
- Richard Davis – double bass
- Tony Williams – drums

== Charts ==
Chart performance for Out to Lunch!
Chart (2021–2026)	Peak position
Australian Jazz & Blues Albums (ARIA)	10
US Top Album Sales (Billboard)	37
US Top Jazz Albums (Billboard)	4
