= Iron Man (Eric Dolphy album) =

Studio album by Eric Dolphy
- Released: 1968
- Recorded: July 1 & 3, 1963
- Studios: Music Maker's Studios, New York City
- Genre: Jazz
- Label: Douglas International
- Producer: Alan Douglas

Eric Dolphy chronology
Here and There (1966)	Iron Man (1968)	Other Aspects (1986)

Alternative cover
- (Abdul) Mati Klarwein cover art

Alternative cover
- Varèse Sarabande release

Alternative cover
- Jazz World release

Iron Man is an album by American jazz multi-instrumentalist Eric Dolphy, recorded in 1963 and released by the Douglas International label in 1968. The album was reissued on disc two of Musical Prophet: The Expanded 1963 New York Studio Sessions, released in 2018 by Resonance Records.

== Recording ==
The music on Iron Man was recorded during two dates arranged by Alan Douglas: a July 1, 1963, session featuring just Dolphy and bassist Richard Davis, and a July 3 session with nearly a dozen musicians. The July 1 session produced "Come Sunday" and "Ode to Charlie Parker" and another track, "Alone Together", which appeared on the album Conversations. An alternate version of "Alone Together", along with two previously unreleased versions of a tune written by Roland Hanna titled "Muses for Richard Davis", also recorded that day, appeared on Musical Prophet: The Expanded 1963 New York Studio Sessions.

The remaining three tracks on Iron Man were recorded during the July 3 session, which also yielded the tracks "Jitterbug Waltz", "Music Matador", and "Love Me", released on Conversations. Alternate takes of most of the July 3 pieces can be found on Musical Prophet. Alternate versions of five of the pieces recorded on both July dates also appeared on the 2013 Japanese release Muses.

The album liner notes state:

The record was produced during the early part of 1964, when Eric Dolphy and producer Alan Douglas decided to experiment with Eric's original compositions.

Two approaches were agreed upon. One was of clear simplicity; Eric on reed instruments and Richard Davis on bass. The other was more involved – a ten piece orchestra of young men who understood and admired Eric's work.

The recording sessions took place late at night in a very relaxed studio for five successive nights. In this environment the playing of Eric Dolphy, Richard Davis and the other musicians was unbelievably inspired. So much was created, individual compositions went from "almost commercial" to "very far out."

Two albums were produced from that beautiful week. The first, called "Conversations", was released through FM Records... On this, the second, is incorporated performances that were considered too futuristic to put out at that time.

The July sessions marked the recorded debut of trumpeter Woody Shaw, who was eighteen at the time.

== Reception ==
Professional ratings
Review scores
Source	Rating
AllMusic	5/5 stars
The Penguin Guide to Jazz	2.5/4 stars

In an AllMusic review, Steve Huey wrote that, compared to Conversations, "Iron Man is every bit as essential and strikes a more consistent ambience than its widely varied twin. It also more clearly anticipates the detailed, abstract sound paintings of Dolphy's masterwork Out to Lunch, in large part because this time around the program is weighted toward Dolphy originals." He called the recordings "classic sessions" and stated that they "constitute some of the most brilliant work of the early-'60s avant-garde."

The authors of the Penguin Guide to Jazz Recordings commented: "Iron Man is... valuable for two fine duets with Richard Davis and for glimpses of Dolphy playing with the ill-fated Woody Shaw, a desperately underrated but unforgivably prodigal trumpeter whose recorded legacy is only a fraction of what it ought to be."

Dolphy biographers Vladimir Simosko and Barry Tepperman called "Burning Spear" "a tantalizing example of the kind of arranging Dolphy must have been capable of turning out", and wrote that "Iron Man" is "an especially strong, vital performance."

== Track listing ==
Side 1:

1. "Iron Man" – 9:07
2. "Mandrake" – 4:50
3. "Come Sunday" (Ellington) – 6:24

Side 2:

1. "Burning Spear" – 11:49
2. "Ode to Charlie Parker" (Byard) – 8:05

All songs composed by Dolphy except as noted.

== Personnel ==
- Eric Dolphy – bass clarinet (tracks 3 and 4), flute (track 5), alto saxophone (tracks 1 and 2)
- Richard Davis – bass (tracks 2, 3, 4, and 5)
- Clifford Jordan – soprano saxophone (track 4)
- Sonny Simmons – alto saxophone (track 4)
- Prince Lasha – flute (track 4)
- Woody Shaw – trumpet (tracks 1, 2, and 4)
- Bobby Hutcherson – vibraphone (tracks 1, 2, and 4)
- Eddie Khan – bass (tracks 1 and 4)
- J.C. Moses – drums (tracks 1, 2, and 4)
