= The Quest (Mal Waldron album) =

Studio album by Mal Waldron
- Released: July 1962
- Recorded: June 27, 1961
- Studios: Van Gelder, Englewood Cliffs, New Jersey
- Genre: Jazz
- Length: 41:17
- Label: New Jazz
- Producer: Esmond Edwards

Mal Waldron chronology
Impressions (1959)	The Quest (1962)	Sweet Love, Bitter (1967)

Eric Dolphy chronology
Far Cry (1962)	The Quest (1962)	Conversations (1963)

Reissue Cover

The Quest is an album by American jazz pianist Mal Waldron, released by the New Jazz in July 1962. It was recorded in June 1961, with Eric Dolphy and Booker Ervin. Some reissues of the album have appeared under Eric Dolphy's name.

== Reception ==
Professional ratings
Review scores
Source	Rating
AllMusic (Warburton)	4.5/5 stars
AllMusic (Yanow)	4/5 stars
DownBeat	4.5/5 stars
The Penguin Guide to Jazz	3.5/4 stars

The AllMusic review by Scott Yanow stated that "the complex music (which falls between hard bop and the avant-garde) is successfully interpreted. Worth checking out".

== Track listing ==
All compositions by Mal Waldron

1. "Status Seeking" — 8:52
2. "Duquility" — 4:09
3. "Thirteen" — 4:42
4. "We Diddit" — 4:23
5. "Warm Canto" — 5:37
6. "Warp and Woof" — 5:36
7. "Fire Waltz" — 7:58

== Personnel ==
- Mal Waldron – piano
- Eric Dolphy – alto saxophone, clarinet
- Booker Ervin – tenor saxophone
- Ron Carter – cello
- Joe Benjamin – double bass
- Charlie Persip – drums
