= Conversations (Eric Dolphy album) =

Studio album by Eric Dolphy
- Released: 1963
- Recorded: July 1 & 3, 1963
- Studios: Music Maker's Studios, New York City, NY
- Genre: Jazz
- Length: 33:50
- Labels: FM; FM-LP 308
- Producer: Alan Douglas

Eric Dolphy chronology
The Quest (1962)	Conversations (1963)	Out to Lunch! (1964)

Conversations is a 1963 album by American jazz multi-instrumentalist, Eric Dolphy first released by the FM label and later reissued by Vee-Jay as The Eric Dolphy Memorial Album the following year. The album was reissued on disc one of Musical Prophet: The Expanded 1963 New York Studio Sessions, released in 2018 by Resonance Records.

The music on Conversations was recorded during two dates arranged by Alan Douglas: a July 1, 1963 session featuring just Dolphy and bassist Richard Davis, and a July 3 session with nearly a dozen musicians. The July 1 session produced "Alone Together" and two other tracks ("Come Sunday" and "Ode to Charlie Parker") which appeared on the album Iron Man. An alternate version of "Alone Together", along with two previously unreleased versions of a tune written by Roland Hanna titled "Muses for Richard Davis", also recorded that day, appeared on Musical Prophet: The Expanded 1963 New York Studio Sessions. The remaining three tracks on Conversations were recorded during the July 3 session, which also yielded the tracks "Iron Man", "Mandrake", and "Burning Spear", released on Iron Man. Alternate takes of most of the July 3 pieces can be found on Musical Prophet. Alternate versions of five of the pieces recorded on both July dates also appeared on the 2013 Japanese release Muses.

The July sessions marked the recorded debut of trumpeter Woody Shaw, who was eighteen at the time.

== Critical reception ==
Professional ratings
Review scores
Source	Rating
AllMusic	4/5 stars
MusicHound Jazz	3.5/5 stars
The Penguin Guide to Jazz Recordings	3.5/4 stars

AllMusic reviewer Steve Huey stated: "it's classic, essential Dolphy that stands as some of his finest work past Out to Lunch!. ... Even if the selections don't completely hang together as an LP statement, they're united by Dolphy's generally brilliant playing and a sense that -- after several years without entering the studio much as a leader -- Dolphy was really striving to push his (and others') music forward. The results are richly rewarding, making Conversations one of the landmarks in his catalog".

Dolphy biographers Vladimir Simosko and Barry Tepperman wrote that "Jitterbug Waltz" "is given a refreshing treatment with a fine skittering flute solo from Dolphy, whose occasional obligato contributions also add vitality and an [sic] unique flavor." They declared "Alone Together" a "masterpiece", stating that "its structure has a unity and logic of classic proportions, and the interplay between the two men is breathtakingly intricate." Regarding Dolphy's solo version of "Love Me", they wrote that it "involved an ornate treatment of the melody, effective use of intervals and glissando, and concluded with a chord -- an impressive revelation of technical skills an order of magnitude beyond [Dolphy's] unaccompanied alto saxophone solo on 'Tenderly' recorded in 1960..."

David Toop also praised "Alone Together": "The language of empathy, its silences, its free movement (though essentially tonal), most of all a sensitive dwelling on the richness of sounds in close combination and as markings cast into empty space, anticipates a type of improvisation that is indebted to jazz yet not confined by its frame... the title is significant, a Broadway show tune: 'we can weather the great unknown, if we're alone together...' whose melody recurs as revelatory object within multiphonics, breath expulsions, abrupt explosive runs, unanticipated convergences and twists born of close listening between two alone-together entities. The song was a standard recorded by many others... In this setting it acts as ghost presence, absent and present, a new balancing of song's melodic and lyrical functions with oblique instrumental contextualization. Implicit within this one piece were two options: one was to forget the song book entirely, the path of free improvisation (but not free jazz, which invariably retained ties to theme and variation); the other was to find greater parity between song and accompaniment."

== Track listing ==
1. "Jitterbug Waltz" (Fats Waller) – 7:17
2. "Music Matador" (Prince Lasha, Sonny Simmons) – 9:35
3. "Alone Together" (Howard Dietz, Arthur Schwartz) – 13:36
4. "Love Me" (Ned Washington, Victor Young) – 3:22

== Personnel ==
- Eric Dolphy – bass clarinet, flute, alto saxophone
- Richard Davis – bass (tracks 2 & 3)
- Eddie Khan – bass (track 1)
- Clifford Jordan – soprano saxophone (track 2)
- Sonny Simmons – alto saxophone (track 2)
- Prince Lasha – flute (track 2)
- Woody Shaw – trumpet (track 1)
- Bobby Hutcherson – vibraphone (track 1)
- J.C. Moses – drums (track 1)
- Charles Moffett - drums (track 2)

Production

- Alan Douglas – producer
- Bill Schwartau – engineer
