= Where? (album) =

Studio album by Ron Carter with Eric Dolphy and Mal Waldron
- Released: 1961
- Recorded: June 20, 1961
- Studios: Van Gelder Studio, Englewood Cliffs, NJ
- Genre: Jazz
- Length: 35:50
- Label: New Jazz NJ 8265
- Producer: Esmond Edwards

Ron Carter chronology
Where? (1961)	Uptown Conversation (1969)

Eric Dolphy chronology
Out There (1961)	Where? (1961)	At the Five Spot (1961)

Reissue Cover

Where? is the debut album by bassist Ron Carter recorded in 1961 at Van Gelder Studio and released on the New Jazz label. Some reissues of the album appear under Eric Dolphy's name.

Professional ratings
Review scores
Source	Rating
DownBeat	4.5/5 stars
AllMusic	3/5 stars
The Rolling Stone Jazz Record Guide	3/5 stars
The Penguin Guide to Jazz Recordings	3/4 stars

== Reception ==
The AllMusic review by Jim Todd stated "Carter and Dolphy had played together in Chico Hamilton's group and on Dolphy's important 1960 date Out There. Where? has elements in common with both, but is closer to Hamilton's late-'50s chamber jazz than to the more outward-bound Dolphy date. ... Carter's skill is undeniable, but his playing on Where? is a bit polite and monochromatic. ...Dolphy -- playing bass clarinet, alto sax, and flute -- is a far more interesting prospect, even if he doesn't blow his face off to the extent he did in other settings"

== Track listing ==
All compositions by Ron Carter except as indicated

1. "Rally" — 5:42
2. "Bass Duet" — 5:43
3. "Softly, as in a Morning Sunrise" (Oscar Hammerstein II, Sigmund Romberg)" — 7:37
4. "Where?" (Randy Weston)" — 5:58
5. "Yes, Indeed" (Sy Oliver)" — 5:51
6. "Saucer Eyes" (Weston)" —5:08

== Personnel ==
- Ron Carter — bass (tracks 2, 3, 6), cello (tracks 1, 4 & 5)
- Eric Dolphy — alto saxophone (track 3), bass clarinet (track 1), flute (tracks 5 & 6)
- Mal Waldron — piano
- George Duvivier — bass (tracks 1, 2, 4 & 5)
- Charlie Persip — drums
