= Richard Slater Jennings =

American painter

- Born: April 5, 1922
- Died: December 18, 2005 (aged 83)
- Other name: Prophet Jennings

Richard Slater Jennings (April 5, 1922 – December 18, 2005), also known as Prophet Jennings or simply Prophet, was a journalist at several African-American newspapers and a self-taught painter whose artwork was used on the covers of jazz albums by Thelonious Monk, Eric Dolphy, and Max Roach in the 1960s. He was a friend and adviser to musicians and other entertainers who gave him the name "Prophet" for his sage advice and philosophical sayings.

== Early life ==
Jennings was born in Youngstown, Ohio. He was the third of six sons of William Jennings and Essie (Strum) Jennings. His father and some of his brothers worked in the steel mill in Youngstown. His mother at one point worked as a charwoman in a public school. As a young man, according to an interview with his daughter, Jennings was a dancer with the Billy Hicks Sizzling Six swing band and was a dance show promoter.

== Journalism ==
Jennings began writing for the African-American newspaper the Buckeye Review in Youngstown in the early 1940s. In September 1945, he was hired by the Call and Post, the leading African-American newspaper in Cleveland. He was apparently meant to bring along a column he had begun in Youngstown, described by Call and Post columnist Al Roman as “the well-known ‘Jive Colym’ which is widely read by all hep-cats.” Jennings was also to handle all Youngstown advertising for the Call and Post.

Listed as Dick Jennings, he wrote some music columns for the Call and Post, as well as contributions to Rowan’s columns, some of them filled with rap-like prose rhymes. For example:

“He had on a crush that was hard and wide and was trilling and drilling with a hipster’s stride. His front was draping much too fine it was a box back affair with candy stripe lines. He always had a story and a whole lot of jive he swears his spiel can bring the dead back alive.”

The Call and Post job ended a little over a month after he was hired when he was in a serious car accident. In May 1947 Jennings began writing for the Detroit Tribune. He covered the music scene, mostly jazz, under the heading of a weekly column called “Diggin’ the Scene.” He started a readers’ poll to select the best local bands, the best players on different instruments, and the best female and male singers.

Lionel Hampton, who had been the subject of one of Jennings’ columns in his Youngstown days, may have had a hand in bringing him to the Tribune; Hampton began writing a weekly column for the paper as theatrical editor a week before Jennings’ debut.

Jennings also contributed columns of “jive talk” for the Tribune under the headings “Jivin’ with Jennings” or “Dick’s Jive." The language of jive was a continuing interest of his. Rowan of the Call and Post, while welcoming the new writer to that paper, had noted Jennings' complaints about how much his “Jive Colym” had been edited. “He should expect his copy to be edited SOME TIMES!!,” wrote Rowan. “Have you read it? It sounds like a foreign language.”

In addition to being a practitioner, Jennings was a student and a promoter of the language of jive. In one of his first “Jivin’ with Jennings” columns for the Tribune, titled “The Birth of Jive,” he wrote:

“Many factors have contributed to the development of the English language since the days of Alfred the Great, King of the Saxons.

Perhaps the greatest was the Norman Conquest in the year of 1066. The immortal William Shakespeare did more that any one individual toward making English a more beautiful and expressive language.

Now in the 20th Century there sprung up a variation of English known as ‘Jive.’ It will leave a permanent imprint upon our English language, and will in the future be referred to as one of the sources of Modern English.

There are some who view ‘Jive’ as a passing fad, like that of the zoot suit. But believe me, ole man, Jive is here to stay."

He then offered a jive version of Hamlet's soliloquy beginning with “To dig, or not to dig the jive; …Jack, that is the question.”

Jennings’ time at the Tribune came to an abrupt end after just six months with an announcement on the front page of the paper that he and sports editor Kenneth Brown “are no longer connected with the Detroit Tribune in any capacity and are not empowered nor authorized to act for same.”

Jennings and Brown launched a magazine called Swingsation and produced one issue of a publication called The Word. Jennings then went on the road as advanced publicity man for Hampton. He also ran concessions at a Detroit club called the Flame Showbar where he met many musicians.

== Art career ==
During a long hospital convalescence from tuberculosis in 1949 and 1950, Jennings took up art, starting with a set of pastel chalks given to him by a doctor and later, after leaving the hospital, buying a stolen set of oil paints from a neighborhood drug addict. His artwork explored different themes, including portraits of jazz artists, streetscapes, children, flowers, and nudes. He particularly drew on the life of the streets, including drug addiction and crime.

A 1956 review of an exhibit of his pastels at the Grand River Art Gallery in Detroit noted that:

“Most of his drawings impart a message for contemporary society, primarily the segment from whence he came. He is a crusader on drawing paper, wanting to bring to the public eye the sordid environment that some children have to grow up in.”

A 1958 review of a one-man show of his oil paintings in Detroit commented:

“The canvases are peopled with black, brown, and beige, youth and age. Mixed with a little humor, a bit of terror, and a touch of beauty, the impact of Jennings’ paintings is refreshingly alive. One can understand why he is called ‘Prophet.’”

== Jazz album covers ==
In October 1959, it was reported in Jet magazine that Thelonious Monk had commissioned Jennings to work on his next album cover after a visit to Jennings’ studio in Detroit where he saw a portrait of himself. The album, Thelonious Monk with John Coltrane (recorded in 1957 but released in fall 1961) featured Jennings’ painting of Monk in profile, signed “Prophet.”

By the time the Monk album was released, two Eric Dolphy albums with very different artwork by Jennings had already been issued. The artwork on the first album, Outward Bound (1960) featured an image of Dolphy, his head seemingly disembodied, next to an “Outward Bound” sign pointing to an open free-standing doorway and to several planets in the sky beyond. There is an alto saxophone hanging from a post and a clarinet and bass clarinet on the ground.

The artwork on the second Dolphy album, Out There (1961) shows, in the foreground, a metronome perched on the surface of a planet. There is a square opening in the surface next to the metronome with a piece of sheet music sticking out of it. A spacecraft consisting mostly of a bass, with a cymbal, a violin, and the bell of a saxophone also forming parts of the craft, is in the reddish-orange sky above with a sax player on board. More pages of sheet music float in the distance.

Writer Carissa Kowalski Dougherty, in a 2007 article on race and jazz record cover design, said that Jennings’ artwork on the two Dolphy albums referenced the art of Salvador Dalí. (Dali, according to Jennings’ daughter, was one of the artists he admired.)

“The dreamlike qualities, visual distortions, and strange juxtapositions of Jennings’ landscapes reflect Dolphy’s particular brand of free jazz. Surrealism may also have appealed to Jennings for other reasons; Richard Powell notes that several African-American artists, including Getrude Abercrombie and Hughie Lee-Smith, were drawn into a quasi-surrealist style because it allowed them to express their alienation for society.”

Jennings produced another more straight-ahead portrait of drummer and bandleader Max Roach used for the cover of Roach's 1962 album “It’s Time."

== Continued involvement in jazz and entertainment ==
Jennings relationships with jazz musicians and other entertainers went beyond album cover design. In 1961 and 1962 his artwork was featured at musical performances by Sonny Rollins in both New York and Detroit. Eric Dolphy and Freddie Hubbard both wrote compositions dedicated to him. (“The Prophet,” by Dolphy, and “Prophet Jennings” by Hubbard.) Some of his jazz portraits are owned by the families of musicians he painted.

He was one of the people handling programming and production for the Jazz in the Garden series at the Museum of Modern Art in 1962. (The Max Roach Chorus and Orchestra were the closing act for the series.) In 1971, he gave a presentation of his artwork at the Beverly Hills home of Cannonball Adderley.

He also developed relationships with comedians like Redd Foxx and Richard Pryor. Pryor, who Jennings first met in the 1960s, hosted a show of his art in Los Angeles in 1975. In 1977, Jennings played an advisory role in Pryor's controversial and short-lived NBC comedy variety program The Richard Pryor Show. In the 2013 documentary Richard Pryor: Omit the Logic, the show's director, John Moffitt, describes how Pryor would consult Jennings to see whether various bits were “black enough." The video also describes Pryor shooting up his home, including a fish tank and a painting of Charlie Parker by Jennings (although it doesn't identify the artist).

== Personal life ==
In 1964, Jennings married Ann-Charlotte Dahlqvist, a Swedish flight attendant for SAS who had been a singer with a swing band in the 1950s. They moved to Sweden where their daughter (actress Dominique Jennings Brandon) was born. Ann-Charlotte was killed in January 1969 when the SAS plane she was on crashed into the ocean while taking off from Los Angeles. Jennings and his daughter moved back to the United States in 1971.

== Death and legacy ==
Jennings died in Los Angeles on December 18, 2005, eight days after the death of his friend Richard Pryor. His memorial service was attended by a number of jazz musicians and other entertainers. Saxophonist Bennie Maupin, who wrote a song in honor of Jennings, spoke and played at the service.

Musician and filmmaker Ken Goldstein produced a documentary, Prophet Speaks, about Jennings in 2001. It is not available in digital form, but a description of Jennings with a Jennings quote from the film (in a book about jazz) summarizes his varied career:

"Richard 'Prophet' Jennings, known in musical circles as 'Prophet' and artist, friend of jazz musicians, and interpreter of twentieth-century jazz culture, has decoded the jazz trope into its basic component: improvisation. The vernacular is defined in terms of its folk simplicity. He states: 'My life has been one big improvisation. That’s what it’s all about. Because I look at something I want to improvise on it. Just like they improvise on music, that's the way I improvise my life….I never get through learning. I’m always looking for new avenues. I’m always looking for something that’s different. ‘Cause you can make it different….It’s left up to you to make make it different. That’s the way I live my life.'"
