= West Wind Records =

West Wind Records was a jazz record label that released albums by many notable musicians during the 1980s. Some of these albums were previously issued on labels such as Circle Records.

== Discography ==
- 001 Anthony Braxton – The Coventry Concert 1980
- 002 Archie Shepp plays Sydney Bechet: Passport to Paradise Impro 06 1981
- 003 Manfred Zepf & Andrew Cyrille – Paintings
- 004 Anthony Braxton If Memory Serves Me Right 1987
- 005 Sunny Murray – Indelicacy 1987
- 006 Archie Shepp Bird Fire: A Tribute to Charlie Parker Impro 05 1979
- 007 Harry Beckett – Bremen Concert 1987
- 008 String Trio of New York & Jay Clayton 1987
- 011 Steve Lacy Live in Budapest 1988
- 012 Georg Graewe Six Studies For Piano Solo
- 014 John Lindberg Revolving Ensemble Relative Reliability 1988
- 016 Eric Dolphy Unrealized Tapes 1964
- 017 Dresch 4tet from Hungary Live in Cologne 1988
- 019 Gary Bartz, Lee Konitz, Jackie McLean, Charlie Mariano with Joachim Kühn, Palle Danielsson, Han Bennink – Altissimo 1973
- 021 Ray Anderson, Harry Beckett, Annie Whitehead a.o. U3 Klang 1988
- 026 Perry Robinson – Nightmare Island 1988
- 029 Dollar Brand (Abdullah Ibrahim) ...memories West54 WLW 8011 1973
- 032 Clifford Brown and the Neal Hefti Orchestra EmArcy MG 36005 1955
- 065 Art Blakey – For Minors Only Bethlehem BCP 6023 1957
- 2001 Anthony Braxton The Coventry Concert 1980
- 2002 Archie Shepp Passport to Paradise Impro 06 1981
- 2004 Anthony Braxton If Memory Serves Me Right 1987
- 2005 Sunny Murray Quartet Indelicacy 1987
- 2006 Archie Shepp Bird Fire: A Tribute to Charlie Parker Impro 05 1979
- 2008 String Trio of New York & Jay Clayton 1987
- 2011 Steve Lacy Live in Budapest 1988
- 2013 Sonny Clark Blues Mambo Time T 70010 1960
- 2014 John Lindberg Revolving Ensemble Relative Reliability 1988
- 2015 Kenny Dorham Hot Stuff from Brazil Fred Miles FM 403 1961
- 2016 Eric Dolphy Unrealized Tapes 1964
- 2018 Coleman Hawkins Body and Soul 1961
- 2019 Gary Bartz, Lee Konitz, Jackie McLean, Charlie Mariano with Joachim Kühn, Palle Danielsson, Han Bennink Altissimo Philips (Jap) RJ–5102 1973
- 2020 Dollar Brand Ode to Duke Ellington Inner City IC 6049 1973
- 2022 Bill Evans His Last Concert in Germany 1980
- 2023 V/A Trumpet Anthology
- 2024 Carlo Mombelli Abstractions 1988
- 2025 Chris Connor at the American Jazz Festival in Latin America 1961
- 2026 Perry Robinson Nightmare Island 1988
- 2027 Chet Baker My Funny Valentine
- 2028 Bill Evans In His Own Way 1977
- 2029 Abdullah Ibrahim Memories West54 WLW 8011 1973
- 2030 Harry Beckett & Courtney Pine Live Vol. 2 1987
- 2031 Bud Shank – Misty Eyes 1961
- 2032 Clifford Brown and the Neal Hefti Orchestra EmArcy MG 36005 1955
- 2033 Chet Baker Stella By Starlight
- 2034 Coleman Hawkins The Tenor Genius 1958, 1964, 1967
- 2036 Archie Shepp & Jeanne Lee Sophisticated Lady Circle RK 61084/29 1984
- 2037 Chet Baker Tune Up: Chet Baker in Paris
- 2038 Chet Baker Night Bird Circle RK 25680/22 1980
- 2039 David Murray and the Low Class Conspiracy Flowers for Albert Circle RK 18877/8 + 1 track of RK 18877/4 1977
- 2040 Dexter Gordon Midnight Dream Who's Who WWLP 21011 + 4 tracks of WWLP 21006 1977
- 2041 McCoy Tyner – What's New? 1980
- 2042 Gil Evans – Little Wing Circle RK 101978/13 + 1 track 1978
- 2043 Paul Horn 500 Miles High 1980
- 2044 Thad Jones & Mel Lewis The Orchestra 1978
- 2045 Art Blakey Blakey's Theme Who's Who WWLP 21024 + 21026 1980
- 2046 Stan Getz Autumn Leaves 1980
- 2048 Thad Jones & Mel Lewis – Body and Soul (1978)
- 2049 Kenny Dorham Shadow of Your Smile 1966
- 2050 Yosuke Yamashita Trio – Ghosts by Albert Ayler 1977
- 2051 Art Ensemble Of Chicago – Live in Berlin (1979)
- 2052 Perry Robinson Call to the Stars 1990
- 2053 Pepper Adams My One and Only Love Mode LP 112 1957
- 2054 Milt Jackson & Ray Brown Fuji Mama 1976
- 2055 Bill Evans How Deep is the Ocean 1965
- 2056 Gil Evans Tokyo Concert 1976
- 2057 Eric Dolphy Douglas SD 785 1963
- 2058 Bill Evans The Brilliant Bill Evans 1979, 1980
- 2059 Chet Baker in Paris Vol 2 Sonopresse 2S068–16685 + 2 alternate takes 1978
- 2060 Mingus Dynasty At Bottom Live [sic] 1979
- 2061 Bill Evans Live in Buenos Aires 1979 1979
- 2062 Kenny Dorham – Jazz Festival in Latin America 1961
- 2063 Eric Dolphy Naima 1964
- 2064 Art Pepper Art in L.A. Trio PA 3141 1957
- 2065 Art BlakeyFor Minors Only Bethlehem BCP 6023 1957
- 2067 Dave Liebman First Visit Philips (Jap) RJ–5101 1973
- 2068 Johnny Griffin in Tokyo 1976
- 2069 Manny Albam The Jazz Greats (Jazz Greats of Our Time) Coral CRL 57173 1957
- 2070 Manfred Bründl Bründl's Basslab Feat. Barry Altschul 1990
- 2071 Art Pepper & Zoot Sims Art 'n Zoot 1981
- 2072 Heinz Becker, Louis Sclavis & John Lindberg Transition FMP 1170 1987
- 2073 Bill Evans With Monica Zetterlund 1975
- 2074 Sonny Simmons Backwoods Suite 1982
- 2075 Bill Evans My Foolish Heart 1973
- 2076 Stan Getz Utopia 1978
- 2077 Duke Ellington I'm Beginning to See the Light 1940–1966
- 2078 Johnny Griffin Unpretentious Delights 1978
- 2079 Dexter Gordon A Gordon Cantata 1978
- 2080 Harry Beckett Les Jardins Du Casino 1987, 1991
- 2081 Lee Konitz & Frank Wunsch Frank–Lee Speaking 1988–1989
- 2082 Archie Shepp Perfect Passions 1978
- 2083 Chet Baker Welcome Back 1987
- 2084 V/A Concert in Argentina part of Halcyon HAL 113 1974
- 2085 Paul Bley & Hans Lüdemann Moving Hearts 1991
- 2086 Jürgen Seefelder The Standard Project 1992
- 2088 Nat Adderley – Live on Planet Earth 1962, 1966, 1983
- 2092 Monica Zetterlund/Bill Evans Waltz for Debbie 1997
- 2097 Kenny Wheeler/Upper Austrian Jazz Orchestra 1995
- 2108 Chet Baker Plays & Sings
- 2116 Chick Corea Converge 1969
- 2120 Old Folks 1999
- 2124 Archie Shepp & Horace Parlan Mama Rose 1987
- 2129 Ronnie Burrage – Just Natural 2000
- 2155 Pat Metheny – The Move to the Groove 1983
- 2200 Gilberto Gil – Em Concerto
- 2201 Dino Saluzzi – Argentina 1984
- 2202 Vera Guimaraes – Stirring the Forest
- 2203 Tito Puente More Mambos On Broadway
- 2206 Jürgen Seefelder & Azymuth Volta á Turma 1991
- 2208 Soma Southern Cross 1990
- 2211 Gilberto Gil Oriente: Live in Tokyo
- 2212 Ástor Piazzolla – Unforgettable 1981
- 2213 Ástor Piazzolla – Onda Nueve
- 2214 Azymuth – Curumim
- 2215 Ruben Blades – Mucho Mejor
- 2216 Tito Puente 20 Mambos/Take Five
- 2220 Ástor Piazzolla Pulsacion
- 2221 Tania Maria Alive & Cooking 1993
- 2223 Irakere – From Havana With Love 1978
- 2224 Gilberto Gil Esoterico: Live in the USA 1994 1994
- 2240 Ana Vera – Exitos de Fado
- 2400 Woody Herman La Fiesta 1978
- 2402 Thad Jones & Mel Lewis – A Touch Of Class (1978)
- 2403 Cab Calloway & His Orchestra Get With Cab 1944–50
- 2404 Lionel Hampton The Big Band 1983
- 2405 Diahann Carroll A Tribute io Ethel Waters Orinda ORC 400 1978
- 2406 Duke Ellington April in Paris 1969
- 2407 Thad Jones & Mel Lewis Body And Soul 1978
- 2410 Wolfgang Schmidtke Blues Variations
