= Vintage Dolphy =

Live album by Eric Dolphy
- Released: 1986
- Recorded: March 10, 1962; March 14, 1963; April 18, 1963
- Venue: Carnegie Hall, New York City; Everson Museum of Art, Syracuse, New York
- Genre: Jazz
- Label: GM Recordings; GM 3005D
- Producer: Gunther Schuller

Vintage Dolphy is a live album by multi-instrumentalist Eric Dolphy. Side A was recorded at Carnegie Hall in New York City on April 18, 1963, and features Dolphy in a quartet format with trumpeter Edward Armour, bassist Richard Davis, and drummer J. C. Moses. Side B contains three pieces by Gunther Schuller, with varying instrumentation, one of which ("Night Music") was recorded at the Everson Museum of Art in Syracuse, New York with the Syracuse Friends of Chamber Music on March 10, 1962, the other two of which ("Densities" and "Abstraction") were recorded at Carnegie Hall on March 14, 1963. (Note: The authors of Eric Dolphy: A Musical Biography & Discography noted that "Night Music" was also performed on the March 14, 1963 concert that yielded the recordings of "Densities" and "Abstraction." They suggested that, despite the details provided in the liner notes, the version of "Night Music" heard on the album may have been recorded at that concert, rather than in 1962, stating "reviews of that concert list this piece among those performed, and the ambience of the recording seems similar to the other titles made that day.") The remaining track is a rendition of Charlie Parker's "Donna Lee" by an all-star ensemble recorded at Carnegie Hall on April 18, 1963.

The album was released on LP in 1986 by Schuller's GM Recordings, and on CD in 1987 by GM and Enja Records. In 1996, GM reissued the album in remastered and expanded format, adding a recording of a five-part Schuller composition titled "Variants on a Theme by Thelonious Monk". This composition, along with "Abstraction", had previously appeared on the album Jazz Abstractions, in versions that featured Ornette Coleman.

== Reception ==
Professional ratings
Review scores
Source	Rating
AllMusic	4/5 stars
The Penguin Guide to Jazz	2.5/4 stars
The Rolling Stone Jazz & Blues Album Guide	2.5/5 stars
The Virgin Encyclopedia of Jazz	4/5 stars

In a 1987 article for The New York Times, Jon Pareles included the album in an overview of recent Dolphy recordings, noting his "quiet resurgence," and describing his compositions as "odd-length structures with unexpected leaps that suggested a new yardstick for the distance between notes."

Norman Weinstein, writing for The Boston Phoenix, stated that the tracks on Vintage Dolphy are "not so much polished, well-balanced group performances as wondrous examples of Dolphy's imagination soaring, inventing new harmonic possibilities out of note choices articulated with plenty of smears and cries and a Mozartian fluidity of ideas."

Bill Shoemaker of Jazz Times noted that Dolphy's quartet performances on Vintage Dolphy help to bolster the notion that his music "provides the necessary evolutionary continuity between [Charlie] Parker's sensibility... and a wide spectrum of composer/improvisers, including Anthony Braxton, Oliver Lake and James Newton."

Writer Martin Williams dedicated a chapter of his 1992 book Jazz Changes to the album, and remarked: "this album shows Eric in a number of settings, offers him... a range of challenges, and shows almost all the things he could do, all the approaches he knew how to take to improvising." He concluded the chapter by stating: "At this point I should repeat the real reason for this LP: Eric Dolphy was a man born to make and communicate music, and any phrase from any of his instruments will tell you that immediately."

In a review for AllMusic, Scott Yanow wrote: "This posthumous collection features the remarkable Eric Dolphy in prime form... Highly recommended."

The authors of the Penguin Guide to Jazz Recordings called the album "a slightly uneasy combination of jazz and Third Stream material."

Duncan Heining, writing for All About Jazz, commented: "These are important recordings that amount to much more than any number of radio shots from Dolphy's European tours... In several ways, Vintage Dolphy is also a tribute to two major American musical figures—Dolphy himself, and Gunther Schuller... all too often Schuller is remembered... by reference to the term 'Third Stream.' Vintage Dolphy provides an opportunity to grasp what is meant by the term but also to understand how Dolphy might connect with it... These three sets say that there should have been, could have been so much more. But let's be grateful for what there is."

== Track listing ==
=== Side A ===
1. "Half Note Triplets" (Dolphy ) – 8:48
2. "Ode to Charlie Parker" (Jaki Byard) – 8:00
3. "Iron Man" (Dolphy ) – 6:20

=== Side B ===
1. "Densities" (Gunther Schuller) – 4:50
2. "Night Music" (Gunther Schuller) – 3:50
3. "Abstraction" (Gunther Schuller) – 4:44
4. "Donna Lee" (Charlie Parker) – 12:56

== Personnel ==
- Eric Dolphy – alto saxophone (tracks A3, B3, and B4), clarinet (track B1), bass clarinet (tracks A1 and B2), flute (track A2)
- Phil Woods – alto saxophone (track B4)
- Benny Golson – tenor saxophone (track B4)
- Edward Armour – trumpet (tracks A1–A3)
- Don Ellis – trumpet (track B4)
- Nick Travis – trumpet (track B4)
- Jimmy Knepper – trombone (track B4)
- Lewis Kaplan – violin (track B3)
- Matthew Raimondi – violin (track B3)
- Samuel Rhodes – viola (track B3)
- Michael Rudiakov – cello (track B3)
- Richard Davis – bass (tracks A1–B1 and B3)
- Art Davis – bass (track B2)
- Chuck Israels – bass (track B2)
- Barre Phillips – bass (tracks B3 and B4)
- Gloria Agostini – harp (track B1)
- Jim Hall – guitar (tracks B3 and B4)
- Barry Galbraith – guitar (track B2)
- Lalo Schifrin – piano (track B4)
- Warren Chiasson – vibraphone (track B1)
- J. C. Moses – drums (tracks A1–A3)
- Sticks Evans – drums (tracks B2 and B3)
- Charlie Persip – drums (track B4)
