= Out There (Eric Dolphy album) =

Studio album by Eric Dolphy
- Released: September 1961
- Recorded: August 15, 1960
- Studios: Van Gelder Studio, Englewood Cliffs, NJ
- Genres: Avant-garde jazz; Third Stream; post-bop
- Length: 33:50
- Label: New Jazz
- Producer: Esmond Edwards

Eric Dolphy chronology
Caribé (1961)	Out There (1961)	Where? (1961)

Professional ratings
Review scores
Source	Rating
AllMusic	5/5 stars
DownBeat	3.5/5 stars
The Penguin Guide to Jazz Recordings	3.5/4 stars
The Rolling Stone Jazz Record Guide	5/5 stars

Out There is an album by the jazz musician and composer Eric Dolphy which was released by Prestige Records in September 1961. It features Dolphy in a quartet with cellist Ron Carter (in one of his first recorded appearances), bassist George Duvivier, and drummer Roy Haynes. It was Dolphy's second album as a leader, released following his time with Charles Mingus.

The album features four original compositions by Dolphy, "Eclipse" by Mingus, "Sketch of Melba" by Randy Weston, and "Feathers" by Hale Smith. The cover features a painting by Richard Jennings, known as "Prophet".

Dolphy's group on Out There resembles the late 1950s ensembles of Chico Hamilton, with whom Dolphy played and recorded during that time, in that it features both a cello and a bass; however, unlike Hamilton's group, Dolphy's does not contain a guitar or other chordal instrument. Dolphy and Carter solo over bass and drums only, helping to give the album a freer, more open sound when compared to Dolphy's previous album, Outward Bound, which featured pianist Jaki Byard.

"Eclipse" from this album is one of the rare instances where Dolphy solos on B♭ clarinet.

== Reception ==
The contemporaneous DownBeat reviewer identified an improvement in Dolphy's bass clarinet playing and described him as "one of the few uncliched flute players in jazz".

Reviewing the album for AllMusic, Michael G. Nastos noted the presence of "a depth and purpose that were unprecedented and remain singularly unique," and states that "[t]he music reveals the depth of [Dolphy's] thought processes while also expressing his bare-bones sensitive and kind nature." He concluded: "Out There explores Dolphy's vision in approaching the concept of tonality in a way few others -- before, concurrent, or after -- have ever envisioned." In a retrospective review for the BBC, Peter Marsh wrote: "Throughout, the instrumental combinations throw up beautiful clashes and consonances... There's a sense of a proper Third Stream being mined here, and it says much for Dolphy's vision that such combinations are still the stuff of surprise 40 odd years later." Writing for PopMatters, Will Layman called the album "a dream come true", and noted how Dolphy and Carter are "free to explore harmony above the minimal barriers of George Duvivier's bass lines and Roy Haynes' snap-crackle-pop stick work."

== Track listing ==
1. "Out There" (Eric Dolphy) – 6:55
2. "Serene" (Dolphy) – 7:01
3. "The Baron" (Dolphy) – 2:57
4. "Eclipse" (Charles Mingus) – 2:45
5. "17 West" (Dolphy) – 4:50
6. "Sketch of Melba" (Randy Weston) – 4:40
7. "Feathers" (Hale Smith) – 5:00

== Personnel ==
- Eric Dolphy — alto saxophone (1, 7), bass clarinet (2, 3), clarinet (4), flute (5, 6)
- Ron Carter — cello
- George Duvivier — double bass
- Roy Haynes — drums
