= Stockholm Sessions =

Studio album by Eric Dolphy
- Released: 1981
- Recorded: September and November 1961
- Studio: Swedish Broadcast station, Stockholm, Sweden
- Genre: jazz
- Label: Inner City Records IC 3007; Enja Records 3055

Stockholm Sessions is an album by Eric Dolphy. It was recorded in September and November 1961 at the Swedish Broadcast station in Stockholm, Sweden, and was released by Inner City Records and Enja Records in 1981. The album was recorded during Dolphy's second visit to Europe.

Three of the tracks ("Les" (mistitled as "Loss"), "Serene" (mistitled as "Sorino"), and "Don't Blame Me") were recorded in September 1961 for a radio aircheck, and feature Dolphy on alto sax, bass clarinet, and flute, Knud Jorgensen on piano, Jimmy Woode on bass, and Sture Kallin on drums. The album liner notes list the session as having been recorded on September 25; however, Dolphy was reportedly performing with John Coltrane's group from September 12 through October 1 at the Jazz Workshop in San Francisco, so the recording probably took place earlier in the month, prior to Dolphy's departure for the U.S. The remaining tracks ("Miss Ann" (mistitled as "Ann"), "God Bless the Child", "Left Alone" (mistitled as "Alone"), and "G.W." (mistitled as "Geewee")), were recorded on November 19 for a TV special. "God Bless the Child" is a Dolphy bass clarinet solo, while the other tracks from that date feature him along with Idrees Sulieman on trumpet, Rune Ofwerman on piano, Jimmy Woode on bass, and Sture Kallin on drums.

== Reception ==
Professional ratings
Review scores
Source	Rating
AllMusic	4/5 stars
MusicHound Jazz	3.5/5 stars
The Penguin Guide to Jazz	3/4 stars
The Rolling Stone Jazz & Blues Album Guide	3/5 stars
The Virgin Encyclopedia of Jazz	3/5 stars

In a review for AllMusic, Scott Yanow wrote: "This innovative music can serve as a strong introduction of Eric Dolphy's talents to bebop fans who have not yet grasped the avant-garde."

The authors of The Penguin Guide to Jazz awarded the album 3 stars, and commented: "here and there Dolphy seems to be having problems with reed, mouthpiece or articulation. Perhaps he was simply tired."

Texas Monthly's Doug Ramsey stated: "Although he's been dead nearly eighteen years, Dolphy's astringent, bounds-breaking reed work has never been matched."

== Track listing ==
1. "Les" (mistitled as "Loss") (Dolphy) – 3:58
2. "Serene" (mistitled as "Sorino") (Dolphy) – 12:00
3. "Miss Ann" (mistitled as "Ann") (Dolphy) – 4:11
4. "God Bless the Child" (Billie Holiday, Arthur Herzog Jr.) – 5:26
5. "Left Alone" (mistitled as "Alone") (Mal Waldron) – 5:19
6. "G.W." (mistitled as "Geewee") (Dolphy) – 6:00
7. "Don't Blame Me" (Jimmy McHugh) – 12:07
8. "Serene" (mistitled as "Sorino") (Dolphy) (alternate) – 7:40

== Personnel ==
- Eric Dolphy – alto saxophone, bass clarinet, flute
- Knud Jorgensen – piano (tracks 1, 2, and 7)
- Idrees Sulieman – trumpet (tracks 3, 6 and 8)
- Rune Ofwerman – piano (tracks 3, 5, 6 and 8)
- Jimmy Woode – bass
- Sture Kallin – drums
