= The Berlin Concerts =

Live album by Eric Dolphy
- Released: 1978
- Recorded: August 30, 1961
- Venue: Berlin, Germany
- Genre: jazz
- Label: Inner City Records IC 3017; Enja Records SFX-10049~50

The Berlin Concerts is a two-LP live album by Eric Dolphy. It was recorded on August 30, 1961, at two separate venues in Berlin, Germany, and was released by Inner City Records and Enja Records in 1978.

The album was recorded during Dolphy's second visit to Europe, and documents two Südwestfunk (SWF) sessions. Four of the tracks ("Hot House", "When Lights Are Low", "Hi-Fly", and "I'll Remember April" (mistitled as "I'll Remember You")) were recorded at the Club Jazz Salon. The remaining tracks ("G.W." (mistitled as "Geewee"), "God Bless the Child", and "245" (mistitled as "The Meeting")) were recorded at the Funkturm Exhibition Hall. The recordings feature Dolphy on alto sax, bass clarinet, and flute, Benny Bailey on trumpet, Pepsi Auer on piano, George Joyner on bass, and Buster Smith on drums.

== Reception ==
Professional ratings
Review scores
Source	Rating
AllMusic	4/5 stars
The Penguin Guide to Jazz	3/4 stars
Robert Christgau	A
The Rolling Stone Jazz & Blues Album Guide	3/5 stars

In a review for AllMusic, Scott Yanow wrote: "This two-LP set features the great multi-instrumentalist Eric Dolphy mostly stretching out on standards, coming up with very original statements... With trumpeter Benny Bailey helping out on half of the selections along with a strong rhythm section, the two-fer would be a perfect introduction for listeners not familiar with Eric Dolphy's innovative style, but this set is very difficult to find."

The authors of The Penguin Guide to Jazz awarded the album 3 stars, and stated that it is "poignant as a first sign of Dolphy 'going single', working the more open European scene with pick-up bands. This one was better than most, not just because Bailey's tense, boppish sound occasionally recalls [Booker] Little, but also because Auer and Smith lean hard on the beat and push things along briskly... A curiosity, and a significant one in the foreshortened Dolphy canon, but certainly not one for casual buyers."

Critic Robert Christgau described the album as "two astonishing sides and two more than adequate ones," and praised "Hot House," calling it "a fluent, unselfconscious synthesis of bebop and 'free jazz' that sounds entirely up-to-the-minute in 1979."

The Washington Post's Lester Bans remarked: "The unearthing of The Berlin Concerts is a god-send because these tapes were made at the height of [Dolphy's] powers... what comes across throughout this set... is the warmth and intimacy of those rich, jugular vocalisms. Ornette Coleman may have been closer to the spawning barnyard and John Coltrane may have cornered the fire sermon for all time, but Eric Dolphy was the sparrow's heart, pulsing in the briefest of springs."

== Track listing ==
=== Disc 1 ===
1. "Hot House" (Tadd Dameron) – 19:01
2. "When Lights Are Low" (Benny Carter) – 13:00
3. "G.W." (mistitled as "Geewee") (Dolphy) – 2:47

=== Disc 2 ===
1. "God Bless the Child" (Billie Holiday, Arthur Herzog Jr.) – 3:25
2. "Hi-Fly" (Randy Weston) – 14:36
3. "245" (mistitled as "The Meeting") (Dolphy) – 5:35
4. "I'll Remember April" (mistitled as "I'll Remember You") (Gene de Paul) – 13:08

== Personnel ==
- Eric Dolphy – alto saxophone (tracks 1, 3, 6, and 7), bass clarinet (tracks 2 and 4), flute (track 5)
- Benny Bailey – trumpet (tracks 1, 3, 6, and 7)
- Pepsi Auer – piano (tracks 1, 3, 6, and 7)
- George Joyner – bass (tracks 1, 2, 3, 5, 6, and 7)
- Buster Smith – drums (tracks 1, 2, 3, 5, 6, and 7)
