= Caribé =

Studio album by The Latin Jazz Quintet and Eric Dolphy
- Released: February 1961
- Recorded: August 19, 1960
- Studio: Van Gelder Studio, Englewood Cliffs, NJ
- Genre: Blues
- Length: 37:37
- Label: New Jazz; NJLP 8251
- Producer: Esmond Edwards

Eric Dolphy chronology
Outward Bound (1960)	Caribé (1961)	Out There (1961)

Caribé is an album by the Latin Jazz Quintet with Eric Dolphy that was recorded in 1960 and released on the New Jazz label in February 1961.

== Reception ==
Professional ratings
Review scores
Source	Rating
AllMusic	3/5 stars
The Penguin Guide to Jazz Recordings	2/4 stars

AllMusic reviewer Richard S. Ginell stated: "This record is the equivalent of throwing a stick of dynamite into a sedate, well-ordered dinner party, having the dynamite go off with a bang, and somehow leaving everything in its place. Such is the volatile Eric Dolphy, a serious wailer on the alto sax and even more idiosyncratic and radical on the bass clarinet, who barges into the lair of Juan Amalbert's Latin Jazz Quintet and doesn't perturb them in the least ... Not an ideal match, then, but fascinating without a doubt".

Dolphy biographers Vladimir Simosko and Barry Tepperman wrote: "Pianist Gene Casey and vibraphonist Charlie Simons produce consistently good solos, but the strongest voice on the date is Eric's, both because his horn is intrinsically the strongest instrument in the group, and because his ideas and musical personality are the most forceful. However he does not take advantage of these circumstances to dominate the proceedings; he plays with the group, in the best sense of the phrase, yet does not sacrifice his own personal approach to playing. The same philosophy that made his records with [Chico] Hamilton generally successful is evident, and the resulting recordings are both interesting and satisfying."

== Track listing ==
All compositions by Gene Casey except where noted

1. "Caribé" – 10:05
2. "Blues in 6/8" (Juan Amalbert, Jose Ricci) – 5:46
3. "First Bass Line" – 4:04
4. "Mambo Ricci" (Amalbert, Jose Ricci) – 6:54
5. "Spring Is Here" (Richard Rodgers, Lorenz Hart) – 5:00
6. "Sunday Go Meetin'" – 5:48

== Personnel ==
=== Performance ===
- Eric Dolphy – alto saxophone, flute, bass clarinet
- Juan Amalbert – congas
- Gene Casey – piano
- Charlie Simons – vibraphone
- Bill Ellington – bass
- Manny Ramos - drums, timbales

=== Production ===
- Esmond Edwards – supervision
- Rudy Van Gelder – engineer
