= The Complete Uppsala Concert =

Live album by Eric Dolphy
- Released: 2005
- Recorded: September 4, 1961
- Venue: Västmanlands-Dala Nation, Uppsala, Sweden
- Genre: jazz
- Length: 1:32:08
- Label: Gambit Records; 69213

The Complete Uppsala Concert is a double-CD live album by Eric Dolphy. It was recorded on September 4, 1961, at Västmanlands-Dala Nation, Uppsala, Sweden, and was released by Gambit Records in 2005. The album, which features one original tune plus eight performances of standards, was recorded during Dolphy's second visit to Europe, and showcases local musicians Rony Johansson on piano, Kurt Lindgren on bass, and Rune Carlsson on drums.

== Reception ==
Professional ratings
Review scores
Source	Rating
AllMusic	3/5 stars
The Penguin Guide to Jazz	3/4 stars

In a review for AllMusic, Scott Yanow wrote: "Accompanied by an obscure but talented rhythm section... Dolphy really stretches out on five of the seven numbers, particularly during a 20-and-a-half minute version of his blues '245.' Other highlights include 'Laura' (featuring Dolphy unaccompanied on alto), 'Bag's Groove' (his only recording of that piece), and 'I'll Remember April'... Dolphy's improvisations are typically unpredictable and adventurous. The recording quality is decent, making this a good set to get after acquiring Dolphy's better-known sessions."

The authors of The Penguin Guide to Jazz commented: "The Uppsala concert tests the band, as was to happen time and again when Dolphy played with local rhythm sections, but they do a more than decent job of it and there are some nice things here."

Writing for All About Jazz, Andrey Henkin stated: "While not the revelation that Blue Note's The Illinois Concert was when it came out, this is good material to supplement the better recorded Berlin Concerts (Enja) or Eric Dolphy in Europe (Prestige)... Dolphy had the Midas touch with any material, and his presence made any group reach for the sublime. He gets the chance to stretch out in Sweden — several of the tunes well exceed ten minutes, providing fascinating opportunities to hear Dolphy working out ideas and concepts that would bear fruit for him in a couple of years."

== Track listing ==
=== Disc 1 ===
1. "What Is This Thing Called Love?" (Cole Porter) – 4:26
2. "245" (Eric Dolphy) – 20:40
3. "Laura" (David Raksin) – 6:56
4. "52nd St. Theme" (Thelonious Monk) – 1:46
5. "Bags' Groove" (Milt Jackson) – 14:07

=== Disc 2 ===
1. "Out of Nowhere" (Johnny Green) – 12:46
2. "I'll Remember April" (Gene de Paul) – 14:31
3. "52nd St. Theme" (Thelonious Monk) – 0:49
4. "When Lights Are Low" (Benny Carter) – 15:58

== Personnel ==
- Eric Dolphy – alto saxophone, bass clarinet, flute
- Rony Johansson – piano
- Kurt Lindgren – bass
- Rune Carlsson – drums
