= The Great Concert of Charles Mingus =

Live album by Charles Mingus
- Released: 1971
- Recorded: April 19, 1964
- Venue: Théâtre des Champs-Élysées, Paris
- Genre: Jazz
- Length: 129:25 (vinyl) 127:11 (CD)
- Label: America

Charles Mingus chronology
Revenge! (1964)	The Great Concert of Charles Mingus (1971)	Mingus in Europe Volume I (1964)

Professional ratings
Review scores
Source	Rating
AllMusic	5/5 stars
The Penguin Guide to Jazz Recordings	4/4 stars
The Rolling Stone Jazz Record Guide	5/5 stars
DownBeat	5/5 stars

The Great Concert of Charles Mingus is a live album by the jazz bassist and composer Charles Mingus, recorded at the Théâtre des Champs-Élysées, Paris, France, on April 19, 1964. It was originally released as a triple album in 1971 on the French America label. The album was recorded just two days after the live sessions that produced Revenge!, which was also recorded live in Paris.

== Track listing ==
All songs written by Charles Mingus, except where noted. On the original vinyl release, "So Long Eric (Don’t Stay Over There Too Long)" was credited as "Goodbye Pork Pie Hat", "Parkeriana" was credited as "Parker Iana", "Meditations On Integration" was credited as "Meditation For Integration". These three errors have been corrected in subsequent editions on CD. On April 18, during the preceding concert at The Salle Wagram, after playing "So Long Eric", Johnny Coles became ill and fainted on stage. For this reason, Coles only appears on the version of "So Long Eric" included on the LP issue, with a restored version without Coles included on the CD reissue. Coles can be heard on recordings of other dates during Mingus' concert tour.

=== Vinyl pressing ===
Side one
No.	Title	Length
1.	"Introduction and Presentation"	1:35
2.	"So long Eric (1ère partie) Salle Wagram 17 april 1964"	23:30
Total length:		25:05

Side two
No.	Title	Length
1.	"So long Eric (2e partie)"	5:40
2.	"Orange Was The Colour Of Her Dress"	14:00
Total length:		19:40

Side three
No.	Title	Length
1.	"Parker Iana"	23:00
Total length:		23:00

Side four
No.	Title	Length
1.	"Meditation For Integration"	27:00
Total length:		27:00

Side five
No.	Title	Length
1.	"Fables of Faubus (1ère partie)"	17:20
Total length:		17:20

Side six
No.	Title	Length
1.	"Fables of Faubus (2e partie)"	11:20
2.	"Sophisticated Lady" (Ellington, Mills, Parish)	6:00
Total length:		17:20

=== CD pressing ===
Disc one
No.	Title	Length
1.	"A.T.F.W. (Art Tatum Fats Waller)"	4:17
2.	"Presentation Of Musicians"	1:08
3.	"So Long Eric (Don't Stay Over There Too Long)"	21:47
4.	"Orange Was the Color of Her Dress, Then Blue Silk"	14:29
5.	"Fables of Faubus"	27:46
Total length:		69:27

Disc two
No.	Title	Length
1.	"Sophisticated Lady" (Ellington, Mills, Parish)	7:55
2.	"Parkeriana (Dedicated To A Genius)"	27:04
3.	"Meditations On Integration (Or For A Pair Of Wire Cutters)"	22:45
Total length:		57:44

== Personnel ==
- Charles Mingus (bass)
- Eric Dolphy (alto saxophone, bass clarinet, flute)
- Johnny Coles (trumpet) on "Goodbye Pork Pie Hat" (LP issue) only
- Clifford Jordan (tenor saxophone)
- Jaki Byard (piano)
- Dannie Richmond (drums)
