= Mingus in Europe Volume II =

Live album by Charles Mingus
- Released: 1983
- Recorded: April 26, 1964 at Wuppertal Townhall in Germany
- Genre: Jazz
- Length: 60:16
- Label: Enja 3077
- Producer: Horst Weber

Charles Mingus chronology
Mingus in Europe Volume I (1964)	Mingus in Europe Volume II (1983)	Right Now: Live at the Jazz Workshop (1964)

Mingus in Europe Volume II is a live album by the jazz bassist and composer Charles Mingus, recorded in 1964 in Germany and released on the Enja label in 1980.

== Reception ==
Professional ratings
Review scores
Source	Rating
AllMusic	4.5/5 stars
The Penguin Guide to Jazz Recordings	3/4 stars
The Rolling Stone Jazz Record Guide	4/5 stars

The AllMusic review by Scott Yanow stated: "Although this music could be called avant-garde, there is nothing random about the notes picked or the many emotions expressed".

== Track listing ==
All compositions by Charles Mingus except as indicated

1. "Orange Was the Color of Her Dress, Then Blue Silk" - 17:00
2. "Sophisticated Lady" (Duke Ellington, Irving Mills, Mitchell Parish) - 3:44
3. "AT-FW-YOU" (Jaki Byard) - 5:09
4. "Peggy's Blue Skylight" - 11:32
5. "So Long Eric" - 22:51 Bonus track on CD reissue

== Personnel ==
- Charles Mingus - bass (tracks 1, 2, 4 & 5)
- Eric Dolphy – alto saxophone, bass clarinet, flute (tracks 1, 2, 4 & 5)
- Clifford Jordan – tenor saxophone (tracks 1, 2, 4 & 5)
- Jaki Byard – piano
- Dannie Richmond – drums (tracks 1, 2, 4 & 5)
