= Revenge! (Charles Mingus album) =

Live album by Charles Mingus
- Released: 1996
- Recorded: April 17, 1964
- Venue: Salle Wagram (Paris)
- Genre: Jazz
- Length: 125:06
- Label: Revenge 32002

Charles Mingus chronology
Town Hall Concert (1964)	Revenge! (1996)	The Great Concert of Charles Mingus (1964)

Revenge! is a live album by the jazz bassist and composer Charles Mingus, recorded in 1964 in Paris and issued on many bootleg releases before being legitimately released on the Revenge label in 1996.

== Reception ==
AllMusic's Scott Yanow called the album "a highly recommended release".

Professional ratings
Review scores
Source	Rating
AllMusic	4/5 stars

== Track listing ==
All compositions by Charles Mingus

Disc One:

1. "Peggy's Blue Skylight" – 12:53
2. "Orange Was the Color of Her Dress, Then Blue Silk" – 11:38
3. "Meditations on Integration" – 22:39
4. "Fables of Faubus" – 24:53

Disc Two:

1. "So Long Eric" – 28:50
2. "Parkeriana" – 24:13

== Personnel ==
- Charles Mingus – bass
- Johnny Coles – trumpet (Disc Two, track 1)
- Eric Dolphy – alto saxophone, bass clarinet, flute
- Clifford Jordan – tenor saxophone
- Jaki Byard – piano
- Dannie Richmond – drums
