= Mingus in Europe Volume I =

Live album by Charles Mingus
- Released: 1980
- Recorded: April 26, 1964 at Wuppertal Townhall in Germany
- Genre: Jazz
- Length: 67:28
- Label: Enja 3049
- Producer: Horst Weber

Charles Mingus chronology
The Great Concert of Charles Mingus (1964)	Mingus in Europe Volume I (1980)	Mingus in Europe Volume II (1964)

Mingus in Europe Volume I is a live album by the jazz bassist and composer Charles Mingus, recorded in 1964 in Stadthalle in Wuppertal, Germany and released on the Enja label in 1980.

== Reception ==
The AllMusic review by Scott Yanow stated: "Although this music could be called avant-garde, there is nothing random about the notes picked or the many emotions expressed".

Professional ratings
Review scores
Source	Rating
AllMusic	4.5/5 stars
The Penguin Guide to Jazz Recordings	3/4 stars
The Rolling Stone Jazz Record Guide	4/5 stars

== Track listing ==
All compositions by Charles Mingus except as indicated

1. "Fables of Faubus" - 37:35
2. "Starting" (Eric Dolphy, Charles Mingus) - 5:27
3. "Meditations" 22:24 Bonus track on CD reissue

== Personnel ==
- Charles Mingus - bass
- Eric Dolphy – alto saxophone, bass clarinet, flute
- Clifford Jordan – tenor saxophone (tracks 1 & 3)
- Jaki Byard – piano (tracks 1 & 3)
- Dannie Richmond – drums (tracks 1 & 3)
