= Nathan Davis (saxophonist) =

American jazz musician (1937–2018)

- Born: Nathan Tate Davis; February 15, 1937; Kansas City, Kansas, U.S.
- Died: April 8, 2018 (aged 81) Palm Beach, Florida, U.S.
- Genres: Jazz
- Occupation: Musician
- Instruments: Tenor saxophone, soprano saxophone, bass clarinet, flute
- Years active: 1960s–2018
- Formerly of: Nathan Davis Sextet; Nathan Davis Quartet

Nathan Tate Davis (February 15, 1937 – April 8, 2018) was an American jazz multi-instrumentalist who played the tenor saxophone, soprano saxophone, bass clarinet, and flute. He is known for his work with Eric Dolphy, Kenny Clarke, Ray Charles, Slide Hampton and Art Blakey.

== Career ==
Davis traveled extensively around Europe after World War II and moved to Paris in 1962. A graduate of the University of Kansas, he held a Ph.D in Ethnomusicology from Wesleyan University and was a professor of music and director of jazz studies at the University of Pittsburgh from 1969, an academic program that he helped initiate. He was also founder and director of the University of Pittsburgh Annual Jazz Seminar and Concert, the first academic jazz event of its kind in the United States. He also helped to found the university's William Robinson Recording Studio as well as establish the International Academy of Jazz Hall of Fame located in the school's William Pitt Union and the University of Pittsburgh-Sonny Rollins International Jazz Archives. Davis retired as director of the Jazz Studies Program at Pitt in 2013. Davis also served as the editor of the International Jazz Archives Journal.

One of Davis' best known musical associations was heading the Paris Reunion Band (1985–1989), which at different times included Nat Adderley, Kenny Drew, Johnny Griffin, Slide Hampton, Joe Henderson, Idris Muhammad, Dizzy Reece, Woody Shaw, and Jimmy Woode. Davis also toured and recorded with the post-bop ensemble leading Roots which he formed in 1991.

Davis composed various pieces, including a 2004 opera entitled Just Above My Head.

Davis died of natural causes in Palm Beach, Florida, at the age of 81.

== Awards and honors ==
On October 5, 2013, Davis was awarded the Mid-Atlantic Arts Foundation's BNY Mellon Jazz Living Legacy Award at the Kennedy Center for the Performing Arts.

== Discography ==
=== As leader ===
- 1965: The Hip Walk (with Carmell Jones, Francy Boland, Jimmy Woode, Kenny Clarke)
- 1965: Peace Treaty (with Woody Shaw, Jean-Louis Chautemps, René Urtreger, Jimmy Woode, Kenny Clarke)
- 1965: Happy Girl (with Woody Shaw, Larry Young, Jimmy Woode, Billy Lewis Brooks)
- 1967: The Rules of Freedom (with Hampton Hawes, Jimmy Garrison, Art Taylor)
- 1969: Jazz Concert in a Benedictine Monastery
- 1971: Makatuka (with Nelson Harrison, Joe Kennedy, Don Depaotis, Mike Taylor, Virgil Walters, Wheeler Winstead)
- 1972: 6th Sense in the 11th House (with Roland Hanna, Richard Davis, Alan Dawson)
- 1976: Suite for Dr. Martin Luther King
- 1976: If (with Abraham Laboriel, George Caldwell, Dave Palmar, Willie Amoaku)
- 1982: Faces of Love
- 1987: London by Night
- 1996: Nathan Davis
- 1998: Two Originals: Happy Girl & Hip Walk
- 1999: I'm a Fool to Want You
- 2003: Rules of Freedom
- 2006: Happy Girl
- 2009: The Best of 1965–76
- 2019: Live in Paris (The ORTF Recordings 1966–67) (with Georges Arvanitas Trio)
