= Outward Bound (Eric Dolphy album) =

Studio album by Eric Dolphy
- Released: 1960
- Recorded: April 1, 1960
- Studio: Van Gelder Studio, Englewood Cliffs, NJ
- Genre: Jazz
- Length: 36:41
- Label: New Jazz; NJLP 8236

Eric Dolphy chronology
Outward Bound (1960)	Caribé (1961)

Professional ratings
Review scores
Source	Rating
AllMusic	4.5/5 stars
The Penguin Guide to Jazz Recordings	3/4 stars
The Rolling Stone Jazz Record Guide	5/5 stars

Outward Bound is the debut album by jazz multi-instrumentalist Eric Dolphy, released in 1960. It is oriented towards straight bebop, and slightly less adventurous than the majority of his later recordings. The album was recorded at Van Gelder Studio in New Jersey and features Dolphy in a quintet with trumpeter Freddie Hubbard, pianist Jaki Byard, bassist George Tucker and drummer Roy Haynes. Hubbard had shared living space with Dolphy when they both first arrived in New York City. The cover artwork was by Dolphy's friend Richard "Prophet" Jennings.

Of the three Dolphy originals on the album, "G.W." is dedicated to the Californian bandleader Gerald Wilson, "Les" is named after the trombonist Lester Robertson, and "245" was the number of Dolphy's house on Carlton Avenue, in Brooklyn's Fort Greene neighborhood.

== Reception ==
Jazz critic Martin Williams wrote: "From the first selection on Dolphy's first album under his own name... it was obvious that fresh and important talent had arrived." All About Jazz reviewer Douglas Payne described the album as "an ardently passionate gathering with pristine contributions from some of jazz's most flexible avatars... The music ranks, perhaps, as some of Dolphy's most accessible and most easily enjoyed." Regarding "G.W.", J. Hunter wrote: "While the rest of the band lays down beats and fills that would not be out of place on any bop date, Dolphy steps out of the head to blister us with a mind-boggling, lightning-fingered alto solo that threatens to go over a cliff at any moment. Dolphy and his partners maintain this unorthodox balancing act throughout the 1960 session."

Writing for PopMatters, Sean Murphy stated that Outward Bound "brings together a handful of the finest musicians who ever played their respective instruments, and it's more than a little coincidental that, when put in the same environment with a common purpose, there was an affinity and extra edge they conjured up, seemingly out of nowhere... If you've never experienced the joy that is Eric Dolphy, there is no better place to begin since this is where it all officially began. If, in the final analysis, it is not the unqualified masterpiece that Out To Lunch would be, and does not possess the truly strange and unfathomable wonder of Out There, it can contentedly settle for merely being a great album. Outward Bound, in sum, is a top tier effort from a tremendous quintet, and it signals the start of an abbreviated but incendiary burst of creative genius."

== Track listing ==
All compositions by Eric Dolphy except where noted.

1. "G.W." – 7:57
2. "On Green Dolphin Street" (Bronisław Kaper, Ned Washington) – 5:44
3. "Les" – 5:12
4. "245" – 6:49
5. "Glad to Be Unhappy" (Richard Rodgers, Lorenz Hart) – 5:26
6. "Miss Toni" (Charles "Majeed" Greenlee) – 5:40

== Personnel ==
- Eric Dolphy – flute (#5), bass clarinet (#2 & 6), alto saxophone (#1, 3 & 4)
- Freddie Hubbard – trumpet (except on #5)
- Jaki Byard – piano
- George Tucker – bass
- Roy Haynes – drums
