= Michael Griener =

German jazz percussionist (born 1968)

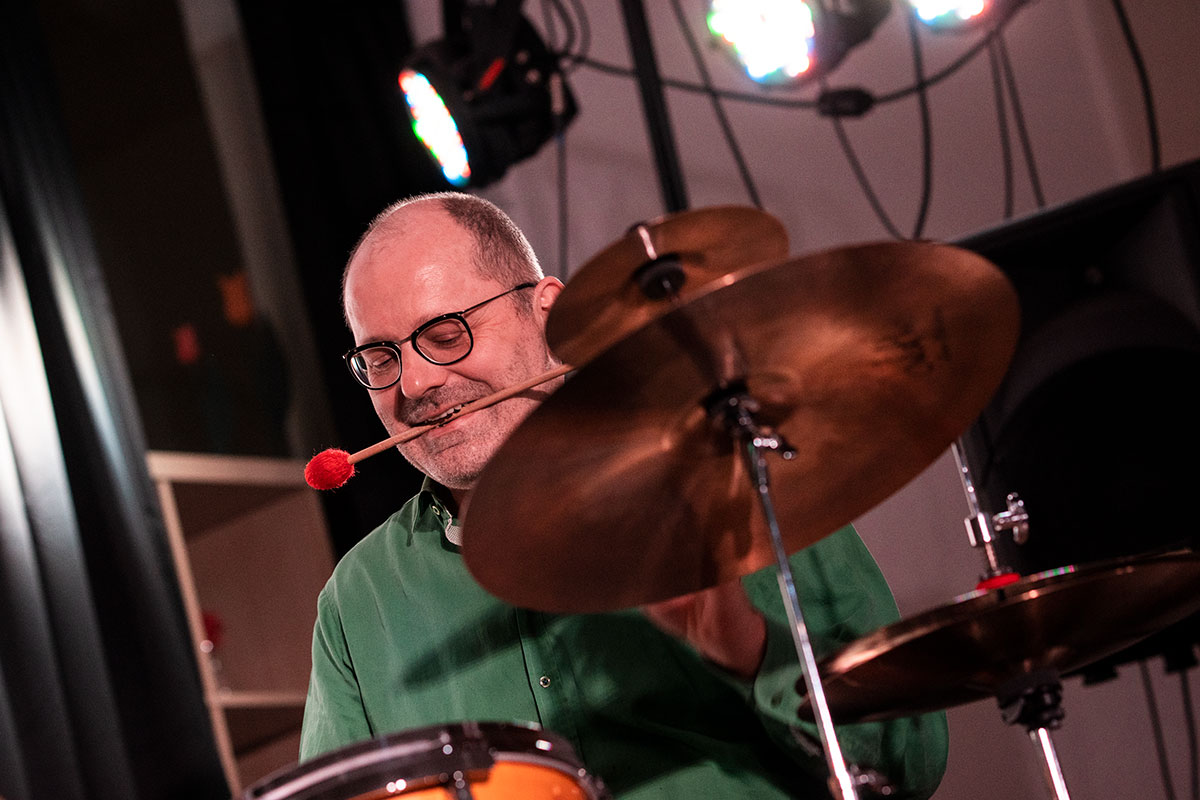
- Griener in 2022

Background information
- Born: 6 February 1968 (age 57); Nuremberg, Germany
- Genres: Jazz
- Occupation: Musician
- Instrument: Percussion
- Website: michaelgriener.de

Michael Griener (born 6 February 1968) is a German jazz percussionist.

== Life and Works ==
Griener, who was already well known as an improviser and interpreter of contemporary music, moved to Berlin in 1994. In Berlin, he appeared on the scenes with many musicians such as Tal Farlow, Herb Ellis, Barry Guy, Axel Dörner, Mal Waldron, Paul Lovens, Zeena Parkins, Keith Tippett, Butch Morris, Ulrich Gumpert, Evan Parker, Aki Takase, Mats Gustafsson, Alexander von Schlippenbach, Joëlle Léandre, David Liebman, Conny Bauer, Johannes Bauer, Andrea Neumann, Chris Dahlgren, Frank Gratkowski, Phil Minton and Tony Buck.

He cooperated with Günther Christmann in Vario-Projekte for a long time (at C.I.M. festival in the Hague 1990. at Moers festival 1992, Interplay 2006, ...). With the duet Kimmo Elomaa and with the Live-Elektroniker Jayrope, he was awarded the prize Senate of Berlin in 2001. Besides, he worked with dancers like Anzu Furukawa and David Zambrano and with actors and writers. He collaborated also with Oskar Ansull in the Paul Celan project. At present, he plays in Ulrich Gumpert's quartet, Baby Bonk, and his own trio Themore 3, TGW (with Christian Weber and Michael Thieke), in Lacy Pool and in a duet with Ernst-Ludwig Petrowsky.

Griener made tours in many European countries and also in Turkey, Israel, Morocco and the USA. He teaches jazz and rhythm at the Hochschule für Musik Carl Maria von Weber and at the Jazz School Berlin.

== Awards and honours ==
In March 2006, he won the prize the most creative soloist at the Neuer Deutscher Jazzpreis. In November 2008, he was appointed honorary professor of the Hochschule für Music Carl Maria von Weber.

== Discography ==
1993

- Günter Christmann Sometimes crosswise Moers Music 02094
- Proust Vol. 2 Hybrid HMP CD 5

1994

- Griener Schweitzer Sudmann Laarmann Jazz-Festival Münster

1997

- Andreas Willers trio Blue Collar JazzHausMusik JHM 89

1998

- Butch Morris Conducts Berlin Skyscraper '95 with Bernhard Arndt, Elisabeth Böhm-Christl, Johanne Braun, Nicholas Bussmann, David de Bernardi, Axel Dörner, Wolfgang Fuchs, Gregor Hotz, Aleks Kolkowski, Stephan Mathieu, Dietrich Petzold, Kirsten Reese, Albrecht Riermeier, Olaf Rupp, Tatjana Schütz, Marc Stutz-Boukouya FMP CD 92/93

1999

- Andreas Willers Trio Tin Drum Stories between the lines 009

2003

- Paul Brody's Tango Toy South Klezmer Suite Laika Records 3510170. 2

2004

- Schwimmer 7x4x7 creative sources cs 013
- Various No Idea Festival spring garden music 011

2005

- Denzler/Dörner/Müller/Erdmann/Griener Stralau creative sources cs 032
- Willers/Dominique Pifarély/Grange/Griener Montauk between the lines BTLCHR 71208
- Zoran Terzic trio : I Konnex Records KCD 5139
- Babybonk sagt die Wahrheit (with Kalle Kalima, Martin Klingeberg, Jan Roder) Konnex KCD 5147
- Baltschun/Butcher/Christmann/Griener Vario 41 edition explico 14

2007

- Thieke/Griener/Weber The Amazing Dr. Clitterhouse Ayler Records aylDL-058
- Carl Ludwig Hübsch's Primordial Soup (with Axel Dörner, Frank Gratkowski, Carl Ludwig Hübsch) Red Toucan RT9331
- Dietrich Eichmann ensemble the hot days (with Chris Heenan, Christian Weber, Alexander Frangenheim, Gunnar Brandt-Sigurdsson, Dietrich Eichmann) Leo Records LR 486
- Ulrich Gumpert Quartette (with Ulrich Gumpert, Ben Abarbanel-Wolff, Jan Roder) Intakt Records Intakt CD 127
- „Ich hebe meine Augen in die Welt" – Groteske Gedichte und ein Prosatext von Alfred Lichtenstein, audiobook with Barbara Wittmann and Detlef Bierstedt with Aki Takase and Michael Griener, audiobook edition words & music, 2007, ISBN 978-3-9811778-2-4

2008

- SQUAKK with Jan Roder (bass), Christof Thewes (trombone) JW 046 recorded in 7 August 2008 in NUPHOBIA Studios, Berlin
