= Sebastian Gramss =

German musician and composer

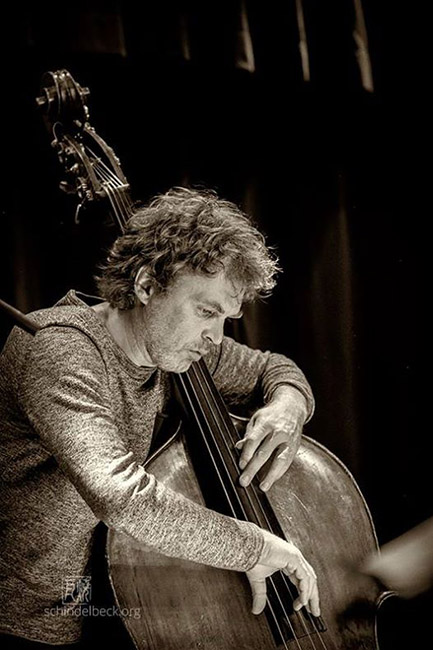
- Gramss in 2017

Background information
- Born: July 13, 1966 (age 59); Wilhelmshaven, Germany
- Genres: Jazz, contemporary music
- Occupations: Musician, composer
- Instruments: Double bass, cello
- Labels: JazzHausMusik, Enja, fixcel
- Website: www.sebastiangramss.de

Sebastian Gramss is a German double bassist, cellist, and composer of jazz and contemporary music. He received the Echo award for double bass in 2013 and 2018.

== Biography ==
Gramss studied double bass at Conservatorium van Amsterdam and Hochschule für Musik Köln.

He is composing for various groups as well as for radio plays, drama, film soundtracks and ballet. (He wrote among others for Pina Bausch.) Since 2009 he teaches Ensemble/Improvisation and double bass at Hochschule für Musik Köln and at "Institut für Musik Osnabrück".

In 1993 Gramss founded the group Underkarl with Frank Wingold (guitar), Lömsch Lehmann (saxophone), Dirk-Peter Kölsch (drums) and Nils Wogram (trombone), still active as of 2017. He played with Frank Gratkowski, Tatsuya Nakatani, Rudi Mahal, Marilyn Crispell, Fred Frith, Tom Cora, Elliott Sharp, Peter Kowald, Taylor Ho Bynum, Zeena Parkins, Peter Brötzmann, Robert Dick, Karl Berger, Axel Dörner, Hannes Bauer, Heinz von Cramer, Terry Jenoure, Marjana Sadowska. He organized several groups for double bass such as the 50-member band "Bassmasse".

His group Hard Boild Wonderland was awarded the special jury prize at the German Jazz Prize awards in 2022.

The group Meteors, which he leads, released a 17-track album, Message from Outer Space, in 2023.

== Discography (selection) ==
- The Remedy, with Tom Cora, Peter Kowald, Axel Dörner, among others (JazzHausMusik, 1993)
- Underkarl – 20th Century Jazz Cover (Tcb, 1996)
- Underkarl – Jazzessence (Tcb, 1999)
- Underkarl – Maraton (Scat, 2001)
- Underkarl – Second Brain and Freemix (Second Brain Revisited) (Enja, 2003)
- Terry Jenoure / Helios String Quartet / Sebastian Gramss – Looks Like Me (Free Elephant, 2006)
- Underkarl – Goldberg (Enja, 2007)
- oirTrio – Kanata (Nottwo, 2008, with Frank Gratkowski and Tatsuya Nakatani)
- Das Mollsche Gesetz – Catalogue of Improvisation (WERGO, 2008)
- Fossile3 – Chomics (Konnex, 2010, with Rudi Mahall, Etienne Nillesen)
- Sebastian Gramss / Frank Gratkowski / Alexei Lapin / Helen Bledsoe – Unplugged Mind (Leo, 2009)
- Leonhard Huhn / Sebastian Gramss – Duke Ellington's Far East Suite (fixcel, 2011)
- Marilyn Crispell / Erwin Ditzner / Sebastian Gramss – Free Flight (fixcel, 2011)
- Underkarl – Homo Ludens (Rent a Dog, 2012)
- Atopie, solo (JazzHausMusik, 2012)
- 78 RPM, Fossile 3 (Gligg-Records 2013)
- Bassmasse / Schwarm, Kontrabassorchester (Gligg-Records 2013)
- Clarinet Summit Clarinet Summit (2017), with Perry Robinson, Gianluigi Trovesi, Bernd Konrad, Theo Jörgensmann, Annette Maye, Albrecht Maurer and Günter Sommer.
