= Stephan Mathieu =

German mastering engineer (born 1967)

- Origin: Saarbrücken
- Genres: Experimental, Electroacoustics, Avantgarde, Contemporary music, Dream pop, Improv, Jazz, Electronica, Ambient, Alternative, Noise
- Occupations: Mastering engineer, musician
- Years active: 1989–present
- Website: Schwebung Mastering

Stephan Mathieu (born 11 October 1967) is a German mastering engineer and former musician. He currently lives in Bonn, Germany where he runs Schwebung Mastering, an independent studio for audio mastering and restoration.

"(In 1997), I worked as an engineer and teacher in a classic electronic music studio in France, the former CERM (Centre européen de recherche musicale) Metz, where I had set up an experimental analog lab around their vintage devices by ARP, Crumar, EMS, Moog, New England Digital and Roland, as well as a digital production studio featuring the latest Pro Tools 24-Bit audio technology. There I started mastering in 1998 – without exactly knowing that’s what I did – by transferring countless DATs and reels with recordings made during their annual festival, cleaned, edited, and EQed them for archival purposes and as CD-R copies for the composers and performers. Around the same time, I began a long journey of learning more about listening critically, frequencies and dynamics while attending many mastering sessions for my material."

Mathieu founded Schwebung Mastering in 2014 and has "collaborated with producers running the gamut of modern recorded music." He has worked for labels such as Editions Mego, Important Records, Kranky, Mexican Summer, One Little Independent Records, Past Inside The Present, RVNG Intl., Sacred Bones, Saltern, Secretly Canadian, Sferic, Shelter Press, Unseen Worlds, and mastered music by Ákos Rózmann, Alessandro Cortini, Anton Webern, "Blue" Gene Tyranny, Catherine Christer Hennix, Celer, Charles Curtis, David Rosenboom, Éliane Radigue, Félicia Atkinson, Fennesz, Grouper, Jefre Cantu-Ledesma, John McGuire, Kali Malone, Morton Feldman, Richard Landry, Robert Ashley, Stephen O'Malley, Terry Jennings, The Caretaker, Yoshi Wada among many others.

== Selected mastering and restoration credits ==
- Vladislav Delay | Isoviha | LP | Planet Mu
- Terry Jennings | Piece for Cello and Saxophone (1960) | Double-LP | Saltern
- John McGuire | Pulse Music | Unseen Worlds
- Fennesz | Hotel Paral.lel | Double-LP/CD | Editions Mego
- Claire Rousay | Everything perfect is already here | LP | Shelter Press
- Klara Lewis | Live In Montreal 2018 | CD | Editions Mego
- Raum | Daughter | Double-LP/CD | Yellow Electric
- Shuttle358 | Chessa | Double-LP | Keplar
- Yoshi Wada | The Appointed Cloud | LP | Saltern
- Alessandro Cortini | Forse | 4-CD boxed set | Important Records
- Grouper | Shade | LP/CD | Kranky
- Donnacha Costello | Together Is The New Alone | Double-LP | Keplar
- Black Swan | Repetition Hymns | Double-LP | Past Inside the Present
- "Blue" Gene Tyranny | Degrees Of Freedom Found | 5-CD boxed set | Unseen Worlds
- Lubomyr Melnyk | KMH - Piano Music In The Continuous Mode | Digital | Unseen Worlds
- Félicia Atkinson | Everything Evaporate | LP | Shelter Press
- Dialect | Under~Between | LP | Rvng Intl.
- Ian William Craig & Daniel Lentz | In a Word | LP | FRKWYS
- Irena and Vojtěch Havlovi | Melodies In The Sand | LP | Melody As Truth
- Roméo Poirier | Hotel Nota | LP | Sferic
- Stephen O'Malley | Auflösung der Zeit | LP | Editions Mego
- Hermann Nitsch | Akustisches Abreaktionsspiel | LP | Tochnit Aleph
- Jefre Cantu-Ledesma | Love Is A Stream | LP | Devotion
- Hilary Woods | Birthmarks | LP/CD | Sacred Bones Records
- Charles Curtis | Performances & Recordings 1998 - 2018 | 2-CD boxed set | Saltern
- Catherine Christer Hennix | The Deontic Miracle: Selections From 100 Models Of Hegikan Roku | Double-LP | Blank Forms
- Celer | Xièxie | Double-LP/CD | Two Acorns
- Richard Youngs | New World Memory | LP | No Fans Records
- The Caretaker | Everywhere, An Empty Bliss | CD | History Always Favours The Winners
- Simone Forti | Al Di Là | CD | Saltern
- Leyland Kirby | We, So Tired Of All The Darkness In Our Lives | Double-LP | History Always Favours The Winners
- Jefre Cantu-Ledesma | A Year With 13 Moons | LP/CD | Mexican Summer
- John Hudak | Room With Sky | CD | Spekk

== Background ==
Stephan Mathieu was born in Saarbrücken, Germany. At age of 10, he started to play drums. In 1984 he quit school to study haircutting after Vidal Sassoon, a profession he followed until 1989, when he decided to focus entirely on making music.

== Work as a musician ==
Between 1989 and 2017, Stephan Mathieu was active as a musician, working in the fields of free improvisation, electroacoustics and abstract digitala. His work is primarily based on early instruments, environmental sound, and obsolete media, recorded and transformed using experimental microphone set-ups, re-editing techniques, and software processes. His sound has been compared to the landscape paintings of Caspar David Friedrich, the work of Painters Mark Rothko, Barnett Newman and Ellsworth Kelly.

Mathieu's music has been released on 60 records, CDs and digital editions, both solo and in collaboration with Akira Rabelais and Kassel Jaeger, David Sylvian, Ekkehard Ehlers, Janek Schaefer, Taylor Deupree, Robert Hampson, Sylvain Chauveau and others.

Since 1992, he has performed live in solo shows and at festivals in Europe, Scandinavia, North- and South America, Japan and created various sound environments for galleries and museums, a glass-blowing factory, a 17th-century garden, Berlin Mitte, a 19th-century steel plant, parks, an arrangement of 30 cars, a late antique throne hall and various other places across four continents.

Between 2000 and 2005, Mathieu taught Digital Arts and Theory at the HBKSaar University of Art and Design in Saarbrücken and as a guest lecturer at the Royal Academy of Arts Göteborg, the Bauhaus University Weimar, and the Merz Akademie in Stuttgart.

His solo CD Radioland was voted genre-spanning one of the best albums of 2008 by music critics worldwide.

"Mathieu shows that that most functional and impersonal of musical instruments, the laptop, is capable of producing work not only of great beauty but of mysterious and powerful emotion."

== Work as a drummer ==
In 1990 Mathieu moved to Berlin, where he joined a young generation of improvising musicians and worked in several groups with Johannes Bauer, Dietmar Diesner, Axel Dörner, Andrea Neumann, Toshimaru Nakamura, Rudi Mahall, Harri Sjöström, and others. He played in Wolfgang Fuchs' workshop group and the large conduction ensemble Berlin Skyscraper by New York-based composer Butch Morris.

A constant factor in Mathieu's work during the 1990s was the duo Stol with guitarist Olaf Rupp. Stol moved freely between improvisation, noise, and minimal rock, collaborated with various guest musicians and Butoh dancers and recorded a miniCD (Semi Prima Vista in 1994) and a 12-inch EP (001.010.011.100 in 1995) which was released on Kitty-Yo, Berlin in 1998. The same year he returned to his hometown Saarbrücken where he shifted focus towards composing and performing music with computers.

== Computer-aided music ==
In 1999 music label Orthlorng Musork released his Full Swing EP, a 12-inch record with two pieces made from tiny snippets from recordings of Stephan's drum kit, which were processed by DSP software in realtime. He applied this working method to recordings of his piano and guitar playing as well as material by other musicians until 2001, when he changed his approach towards sound from micro to macro, from working with tiny sound fragments to extensive live recordings of acoustic instruments, which were now transformed in real-time using experimental microphone set-ups, re-editing techniques and software processes, culminating in his The Sad Mac CD, released on the Tokyo-based Headz label in 2004.

From 2005 to 2007, Mathieu worked exclusively with real-time processed shortwave radio signals and performed Radioland, an audio-visual surround sound piece, live.

== Work with historical media and instruments ==
In 2008, he launched Virginals, a recital concept which pays tribute to some of the great contemporary composers of minimal, experimental and electroaucoustic music. Interpretations of pieces by Phill Niblock, Alvin Lucier, Walter Marchetti, Charlemagne Palestine and Francisco López are performed by Mathieu on the Virginals, mechanical gramophones, electronic organs and obsolete media devices. Revenant, a new piece written for Virginals by Tashi Wada was premiered in June 2011 at the Collège des Bernardins, Paris.

Between 2009 and 2010, the audiovisual installations Process and Constellations were premiered and performed in Croatia, Spain, and Belgium. Both pieces are closely linked to Virginals in their mechanical-acoustic nature.

In 2011, Mathieu started live and studio collaborations with Sylvain Chauveau, Hans-Joachim Roedelius, Taylor Deupree, Jozef van Wissem and Donal Lunny, as well as relaunching Robert Hampson's Main project.

In November 2011, he performed a live rework of David Sylvian and Holger Czukay’s Ambient classic Plight and Premonition, which led to The Kilowatt Hour, a trio project with Christian Fennesz and David Sylvian in 2013. The trio performed a piece based on poems by Pulitzer Prize–winning writer Franz Wright during a series of shows in Norway and Italy.

Mathieu's final musical work Radiance, a collection of long-form pieces, was released on his Schwebung imprint as a series of digital downloads and a 12-CD boxed set between 2016 and 2018.

== Selected discography ==
- Folio | 8-CD compilation boxed set | Schwebung 2019
- Radiance | 12-CD boxed set | Schwebung 2018
- Before Nostromo | CD/Digital | Schwebung 2015/19
- Nachtstücke | Triple-CD/Digital | Schwebung 2014/19
- Sacred Ground | CD/Digital | Schwebung 2014/19
- The Falling Rocket | Double-LP | Dekorder, Hamburg 2013
- with David Sylvian: Wandermüde | CD | Samadhisound, London 2013
- with Main: Ablation | LP/CD | Editions Mego, Vienna 2013
- Un Cœur Simple | CD | Baskaru, Clichy 2013
- with Sylvain Chauveau: Palimpsest | LP | Schwebung 2012
- Coda (For WK) | CD | 12k, New York 2012
- with David Maranha: Strings | LP | Crónica / Fundação Serralves, Porto 2012
- with Caro Mikalef: Radioland (Panorámica) | CD | Line, Washington 2012
- To Describe George Washington Bridge | 10 inch record | Dekorder, Hamburg 2011
- A Static Place | CD | 12k, New York 2011
- Remain | CD | Line, Washington 2011
- with Taylor Deupree: Transcriptions | CD | Spekk, Tokyo 2009
- The Key to the Kingdom (For Washington Phillips | 10 inch record | Dekorder, Hamburg 2009
- Radioland | CD | Die Schachtel, Milano 2008
- with Janek Schaefer: Hidden Name | CD | Crónica, Porto 2006
- with Akira Rabelais: Perineum | DVD | CONV, Madrid 2006
- The Sad Mac | CD | HEADZ, Tokyo 2004
- On Tape | CD | Häpna, Stockholm 2004
- with John Hudak: Pieces of Winter | CD | Sirr, Lisbon 2004
- Kapotte Muziek by Stephan Mathieu | CD | Korm Plastics, Nijmegen 2003
- Die Entdeckung des Wetters | CD | Lucky Kitchen, La Rioja 2002
- Full Swing Edits | 5 x 10 inch EP and CD | Orthlorng Musork, San Francisco 2001/2002
- Gigue | CD | Fällt Publishing, Belfast 2002
- frequencyLib | CD/LP | Ritornell, Frankfurt aM 2001
- with Ekkehard Ehlers: Heroin | CD | Brombron, Nijmegen 2001
- Wurmloch Variationen | CD | Ritornell, Frankfurt aM 2000
- with Stol: 001.010.011.100 | 12 inch EP | Kitty-Yo, Berlin 1998
- with Butch Morris: Conductions '95 | Double-CD | Free Music Production (FMP), Berlin 1997
- with Stol: Semi Prima Vista | CD | Algen, Berlin 1994

== Selected sound installations ==
- Before Nostromo | The Morning Line, ZKM Karlsruhe 2015
- Equinox | San Bernardo Monastery, Florence 2014
- Nocturne | Piscine Saint-Georges, Rennes 2013
- Untitled String Quartet | La Gâité Lyrique, Paris 2011
- Revenant | Collège des Bernardins, Paris 2011
- Constellations | CosmoCaixa Science Museum Barcelona 2010
- Horatio Oratorio | Fundaçao de Serralves, Porto 2008
- "Die Sonne toent nach alter Weise"/Play! | Two soundscapes for the MUNLAB Ecomuseo, Gambiano 2006
- Strahlungsdichte | Autogenerative soundscape for the Aula Palatina, Trier 2005
- 8Bit Symphony | UNESCO Cultural Heritage Völklinger Hütte 2004
- Heller Raum | Soundscape for the Rosa-Luxemburg-Platz, Berlin 2003
- Un oceano di milione di partecelle | Soundscape for a Leonardo da Vinci Exhibition, UNESCO Cultural Heritage Völklinger Hütte 2002
- Vor "Vor der Stille" | Audiovisual piece for Museutopia, Karl-Ernst Osthaus Museum Hagen 2002
- 1745 | Soundscape for the Impakt Festival, Utrecht 2002
- Die Entdeckung des Wetters | UNESCO Cultural Heritage Völklinger Hütte 2001 (permanent installation)
- Cars | Audiovisual sculpture for 30 Peugeot 206 and sinetones, Saarland Galerie, Saarbrücken, 2001
- Touch | Soundscape for a glass exhibition, Berlin Townhall, 2001
- Betrieb | UNESCO Cultural Heritage Völklinger Hütte 2000 (permanent installation)
- Aussen | Soundscape for the City area of Saarbrücken 1998
