= So Long, Eric! =

Live album by Aki Takase, Alexander von Schlippenbach
- Recorded: June 19–20, 2014
- Genre: Jazz
- Length: 67:06
- Label: Intakt

So Long, Eric! – Homage to Eric Dolphy is an album by Aki Takase and Alexander von Schlippenbach.

== Background ==
Free jazz pioneer Eric Dolphy died in Berlin in 1964. Pianists Aki Takase and Alexander von Schlippenbach organised a Berlin music festival in 2014 to celebrate Dolphy's music.

== Recording and music ==
The album was recorded in concert in Berlin towards the end of the Dolphy festival, on June 19 and 20, 2014. The performances are of Dolphy compositions, arranged by Takase and Schlippenbach. Twelve musicians play on the album, with the number used for each track varying from two to twelve. "Out There" is played by the quartet of Schlippenbach, saxophonist Henrik Walsdorff, bassist Antonio Borghini and drummer Heinrich Köbberling.

== Release and reception ==
Professional ratings
Review scores
Source	Rating
Down Beat	4.5/5 stars
The Daily Telegraph	4/5 stars

So Long, Eric! was released by Intakt Records. The cover art is influenced by that of Dolphy's Out to Lunch! album. The Daily Telegraph's critic wrote that "Everything is brilliantly re-imagined, and infused with quick-witted humour. Most importantly the music-making keeps touching base with Dolphy and the tradition he sprung from, however wild and free it often becomes." Down Beat concluded that "Music is rarely this richly festooned with brilliance and hyper-real personality."

== Track listing ==
1. "Les"
2. "Hat and Beard"
3. "The Prophet"
4. "17 West"
5. "Serene"
6. "Miss Ann"
7. "Something Sweet, Something Tender"
8. "Out There"
9. "Out to Lunch"

== Personnel ==
- Aki Takase – piano
- Alexander von Schlippenbach – piano
- Tobias Delius – tenor saxophone
- Henrik Walsdorff – alto saxophone
- Axel Dörner – trumpet
- Nils Wogram – trombone
- Rudi Mahall– bass clarinet, clarinet
- Karl Berger – vibraphone
- Wilbert de Joode – bass
- Antonio Borghini – bass
- Han Bennink – drums
- Heinrich Köbberling – drums
