= Niels Klein =

German jazz musician and composer

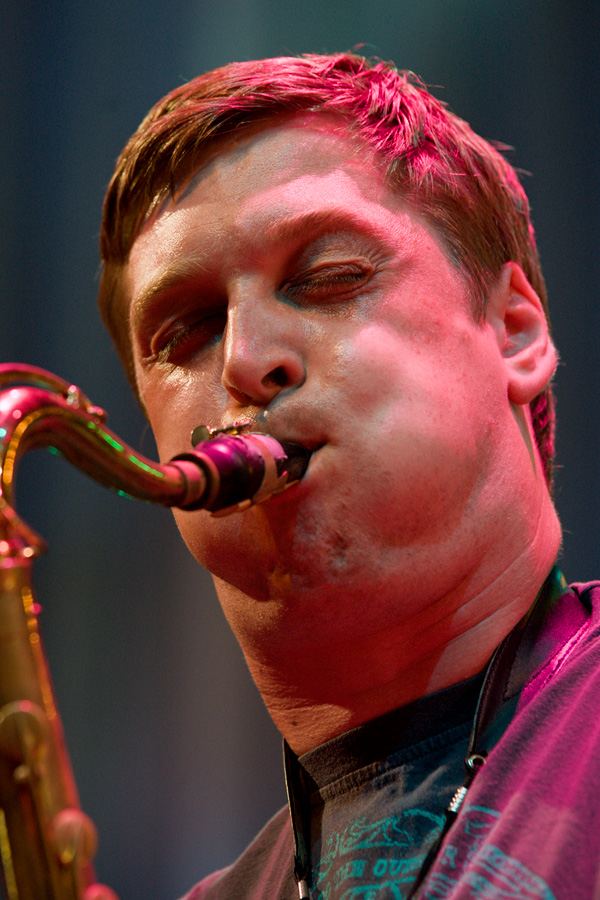
Klein at Moers Festival 2010

Niels Klein (born 1978 in Hamburg) is a German jazz musician (soprano, tenor saxophone, clarinet) and composer.

== Biography ==
Klein started playing the saxophon at the age of thirteen. From 1998 he studied saxophone with Frank Gratkowski and Claudio Puntin as well as composition and arrangement at the Musikhochschule Köln. From 1998 to 2000 he was a soloist and composer of the Federal Jazz Orchestra (BuJazzO). In 2000 he was with his Niels Klein Oktett prizewinner at the Jazzpodium Niedersachsen. From 2001 to 2009, he was a member of heavytones, the band on the television program TV total, with which he has accompanied rock and pop musicians such as Lionel Richie, Busta Rhymes, Anastacia, and Michael Bublé on the 2006 released album Heavytones where he also is represented with a composition.

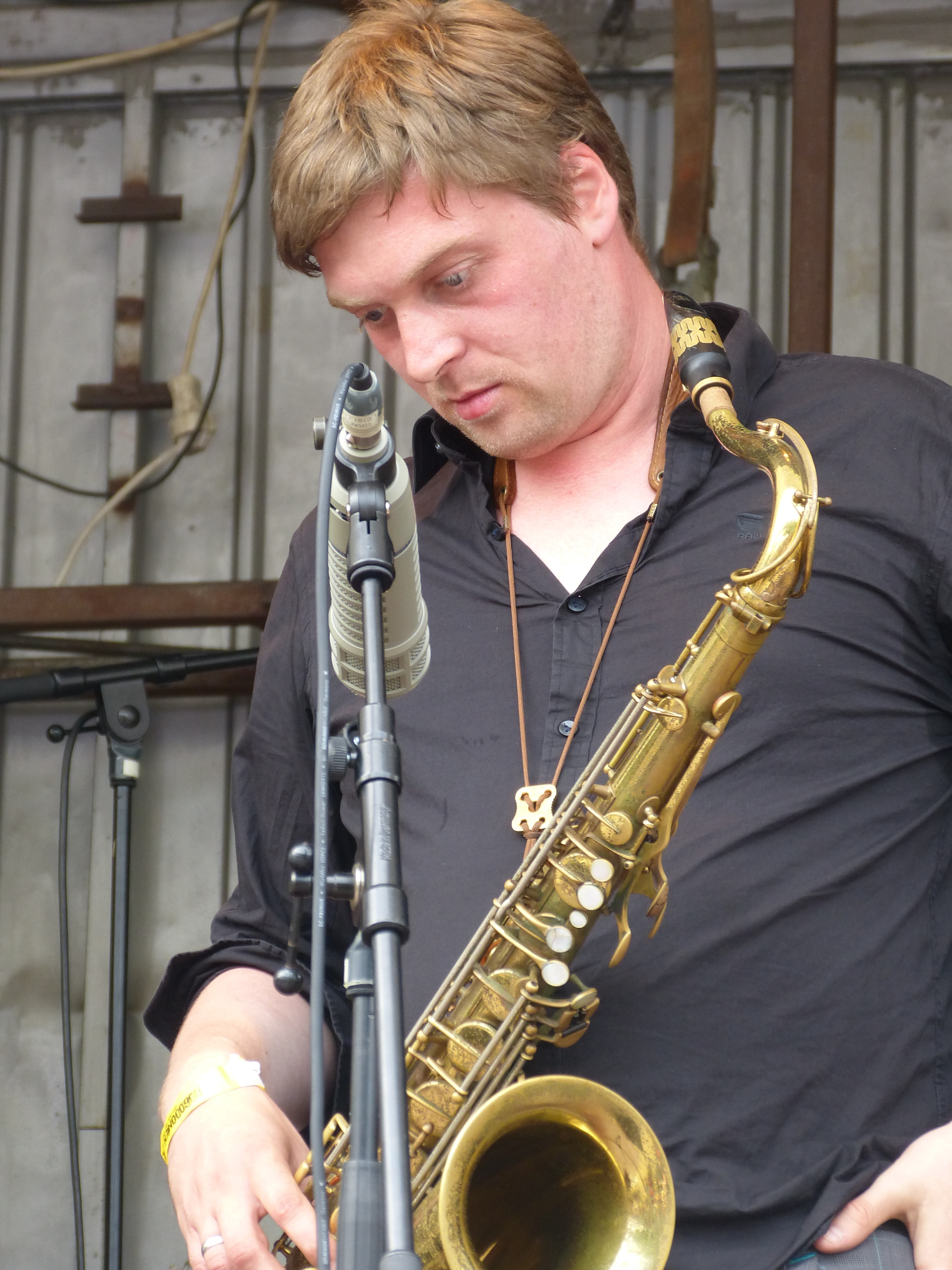
Klein in 2013 at the KLAENG-Sommerfestival in Odonien, Cologne

In 2002, he appeared at the festival Jazz Baltica as Coleader of the band Firomanum together with guitarist Arne Jansen. In 2004, he received the Förderpreis of the State of North Rhine-Westphalia for music, and it appeared the first album of the Niels Klein Trio (with Dietmar Fuhr and Nils Tegen). In 2005, on behalf of the WDR, he compiled the Niels Klein Tentett, for which he composed a ninety-minute program that was performed at the Traumzeit-Festival Duisburg and at the Jazz Cologne Festival Cologne. In the same year he composed a mass for choir and double wind quintet for the ensemble o-ton. His Third stream composition Refractions, for which he was awarded the Europäische Komponistenpreis der Stadt Berlin, was premiered in 2009, by the Federal Jazz Orchestra and the Federal Youth Orchestra. In 2011 he was awarded the WDR Jazz Prize as a composer.

Since 2006, Klein has designed the concert series Jazz-O-Rama in the Cologne Artheater with Oliver Leicht and Matthias Schriefl. He participated in tours and CD recordings (2005) with the Frank Wingold Quartet ("Clairvoyance"), Underkarl ("Goldberg Variationen"), Florian Ross ("EightBall") and the James Choice Orchestra. In 2008, he led the European Jazz Orchestra on a European tour; In 2009 he also conducted the NDR Big Band. Together with Jiggs Whigham, he has been directing the Federal Jazz Orchestra since 2011.

As a sideman, he collaborated with Toots Thielemanns, Jeff Hamilton, Nils Wogram, Albert Mangelsdorff, Bob Brookmeyer, Charlie Mariano, Peter Erskine, Vince Mendoza, Markus Stockhausen, Arkady Shilkloper, Victor Bailey, and others.

Since winter semester 2009/10, Klein has been teaching at the Department of Jazz Theory and Ensemble at the Institute of Music of the Hochschule Osnabrück. For the winter semester 2016/17, he was appointed professor for jazz saxophone at the Hochschule für Musik und Tanz Köln in Cologne.

== Discography ==
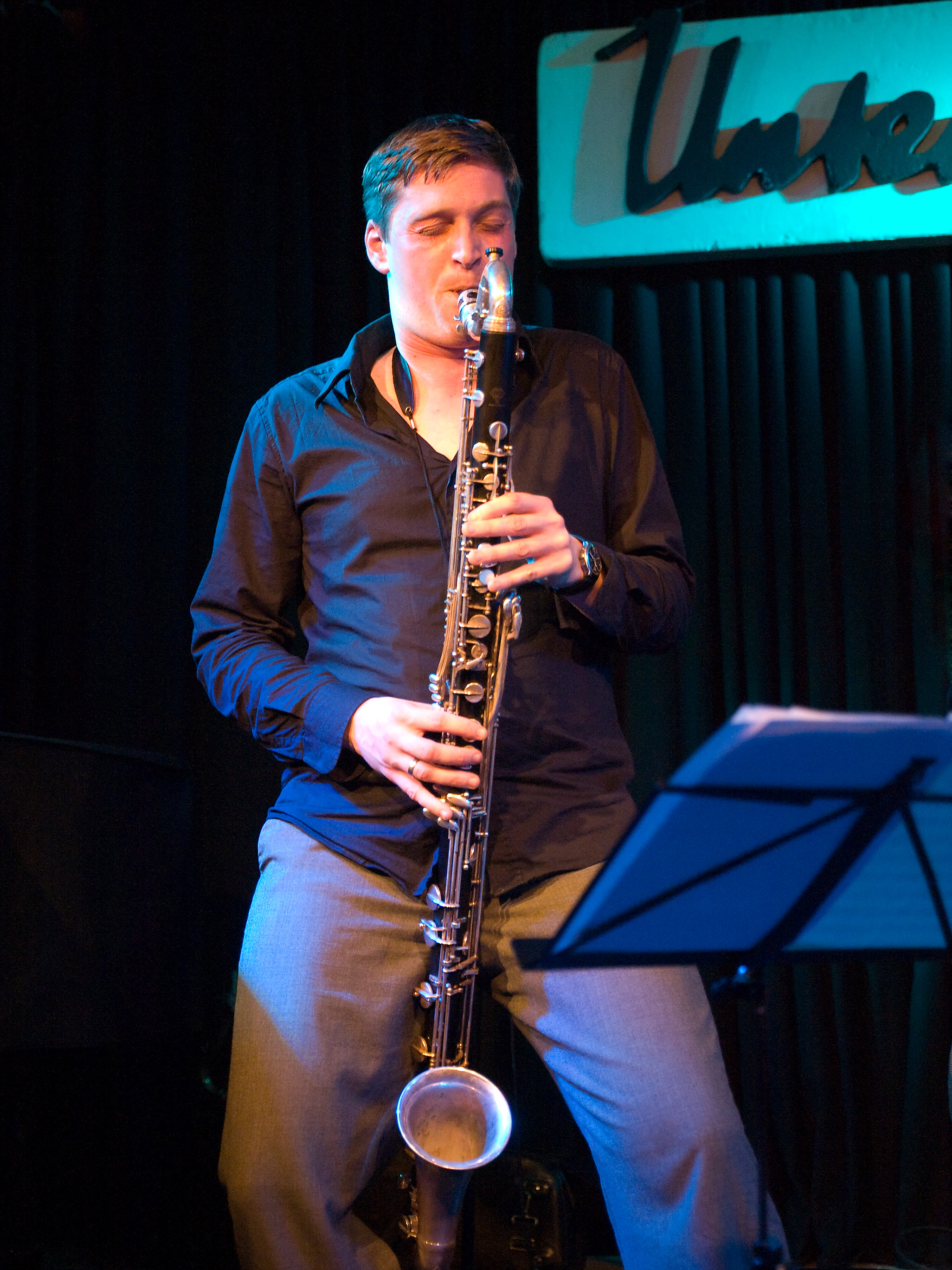
Klein in 2010

- Firomanum: Scope, with Arne Jansen, Eva Kruse, Nils Tegen, 2004
- Niels Klein Trio: It only Took ..., with Dietmar Fuhr, Nils Tegen, 2004
- Frank Wingold: Clairvoyance, 2006
- Niels Klein Tentett: The Last Soup with Oliver Leicht, Steffen Schorn, Stephan Meinberg, Arkady Shilkloper, Matthias Muche, Frank Wingold, Wolf Kerschek, Dietmar Fuhr, Eric Schaefer, 2007
- Florian Ross: EightBall, 2007
- James Choice Orchestra: Live at Musik Triennale Köln, 2008
- Rüdiger Baldauf: Own Style, 2010
- Niels Klein Quartett, with Pablo Held, Robert Landfermann, Jonas Burgwinkel, 2012
- Tubes and Wires, with Lars Duppler, Hanno Busch, Jonas Burgwinkel, 2013 (Echo Jazz 2015)
- Loom, with Stephan Meinberg, Matthias Schriefl, Ludwig Himpsl, Johannes Lauer, Mattis Cederberg, Wanja Slavin, Leonhard Huhn, Heiko Bidmon, Steffen Schorn, Pablo Held, Kathrin Pechlof, Dierk Peters, Frank Wingold, Robert Landfermann, Jonas Burgwinkel, 2015
- Tubes and Wires: Life in Times of the Big Crunch, with Lars Duppler, Hanno Busch, Jonas Burgwinkel, Friedrich Paravicini, 2017
