= Carl Ludwig Hübsch =

German jazz musician and composer

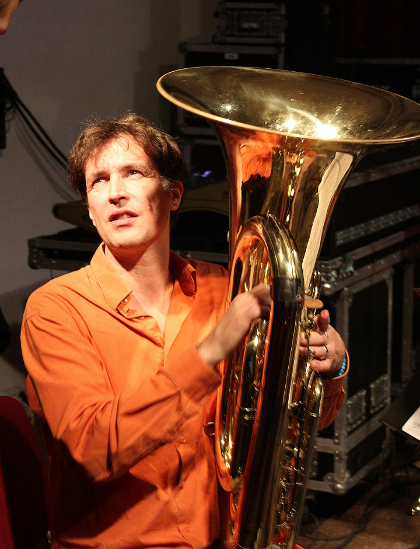
Carl Ludwig Hübsch

Carl Ludwig Hübsch (born 1966 in Freiburg im Breisgau) is a German jazz and improvisation musician who plays tuba.

== Life and career ==
Hübsch initially learned clarinet, then switched to drums, and in 1983 changed from clarinet to tuba. He studied largely as an autodidact, but also studied percussion, voice, and electronic music as well as harmony and music theory at the Pädagogische Hochschule Freiburg. He was later a guest student in the composition class of Johannes Fritsch at the Hochschule für Musik und Tanz Köln.

He has founded his own groups, including Primordial Soup with Frank Gratkowski, Michael Griener, and Axel Dörner. Together with Gratkowski, Matthias Schubert, and Norbert Stein, he was one of the four leaders and composers of the James Choice Orchestra. In 1994, he founded the group Post No Bills with Chris Weinheimer, Tom Lorenz, Robert Schleisiek, and Ole Schmidt, which focuses on improvised music and contemporary music, performing works such as John Cage's "Variations" and "Number Pieces" and Christian Wolff's "Exercises".

Since 1989, Hübsch has collaborated with musicians including Arthur Blythe, Lester Bowie, Jasper van 't Hof, Paul Lytton, Hannes Zerbe, Willem Breuker, Tomasz Stańko, Pinguin Moschner, Thomas Lehn, Ernst Reijseger, Gunda Gottschalk, Harald Kimmig, Lê Quan Ninh, Uli Böttcher, Sebastian Gramss, and Tim O'Dwyer.

In addition to performing with various band projects and orchestras, Hübsch gives solo concerts and conducts workshops for brass players. He organized the SWR New Jazz Meeting; under the title hübsch acht he combined his trio Universe (formed in 2000) with Matthias Schubert and Wolter Wierbos, and his quartet Drift with Isabelle Duthoit, Joris Rühl, and Christian Lillinger, into an octet with Philip Zoubek and electronics player Joker Nies.

Hübsch received the Jazzpot Prize in 2003. He has participated in numerous radio and CD productions and has performed at many European festivals as well as the Encuentro de Jazz in Monterrey, Mexico.

== Discography ==
=== As leader ===
- Der erste Bericht (In + Out Records, 1997)
- Improvisors (Kontrans, 2002), with Claus Van Bebber, Jaap Blonk
- 119 Arten Zu Beginnen (2003)
- Carl Ludwig Hübsch's Longrun Development of the Universe 2 – Is This Our Music? (Neos Jazz, 2005)
- Die Sache An Sich (Free Elephant, 2008)
- The Universe Is a Disk (Leo Records, 2008)
- Giles U. (Another Timbre, 2010), with Christoph Schiller
- Carl Ludwig Hübsch's Longrun Development of the Universe: The Creators Bend a Master Plan (Neos Jazz, 2010), with Matthias Schubert, Wolter Wierbos, Gerry Hemingway
- Souped-Up (Jazzwerkstatt, 2011), with Michael Griener, Frank Gratkowski
- June 16th (Schraum, 2013), with Pierre-Yves Martel, Philip Zoubek
- Hübsch Acht: Metal in Wonderland (Unit Records, 2014)
- Rowetor 04 | Rowetor 03 (Tour de Bras, 2017)
- Otherwise (Insub Records, 2018), with Pierre-Yves Martel, Philip Zoubek
- Dedekind Duos (2020), with Antoine Beuger, Pierre-Yves Martel
- Carl Ludwig Hübsch Artblau: Other Kinds of Blue (2020)

=== As sideman ===
- Simon Rummel: Singinging (2023)
