= Florian Ross =

German jazz pianist, composer and arranger

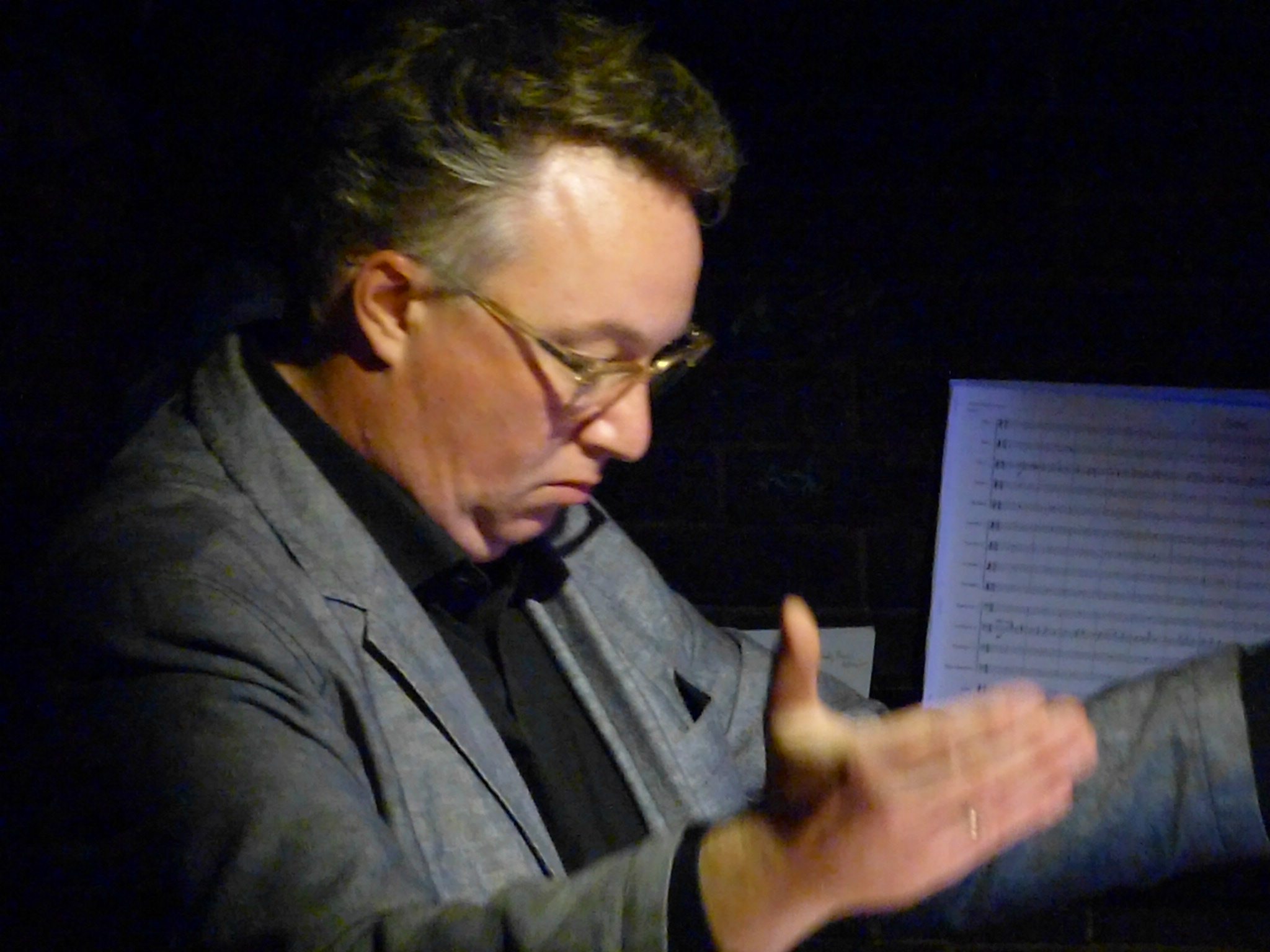
- Florian Ross (2018 in Cologne, Germany, in concert with the Subway Jazz Orchestra)

Background information
- Born: 1972 (age 53–54); Pforzheim, West Germany
- Genres: Jazz
- Occupations: Musician, composer, arranger
- Instrument: Piano
- Years active: 1990s–present
- Website: florianross.de

Florian Ross (born 1972) is a German jazz pianist, composer and arranger.

== Life and career ==
Ross was born in Pforzheim in 1972.

His debut recording as leader was made for Naxos Records in 1998 – Seasons & Places. In 2011, he was commissioned to write a new arrangement of a Bobby Wellins composition for the Scottish National Jazz Orchestra.

Ross released Ties & Loose Ends, his first recording of his own big band project, in 2013. In the same year, the Florian Ross Elektrio, featuring the leader on Hammond B3 organ, was released.

== Discography ==
An asterisk (*) indicates that the year is that of release.

=== As leader/co-leader ===
Year recorded	Title	Label	Personnel/Notes
1998	Seasons & Places	Naxos	Quintet, with Matthias Erlewein (tenor sax), Nils Wogram (trombone), Dietmar Fuhr (bass), Jochen Rückert (drums)
1998	Suite for Soprano Sax & String Orchestra	Naxos	Music for String Orchestra and Jazz Quartet, featuring David Liebman (ss)
1999	Lilacs and Laughter	Naxos	With Ingold Burkhardt, Claus Stötter, Eric Vloeimans (trumpet), Christine Chapman, Ruth Funke (French horn), Jürgen Neudert, Nils Wogram (trombone), Ed Partyka (bass trombone, tuba), Ingmar Heller (bass), John Hollenbeck (drums)
2002	Blinds and Shades	Intuition	Trio, with Remi Vignolo (bass), John Hollenbeck (drums)
2004	Home & Some Other Place	Intuition	Quintet, with Matthias Erlewein (tenor sax), Claus Stotter (trumpet), Dietmar Fuhr (bass), Stéphane Huchard (drums)
2005	Big Fish and Small Pond	Intuition	Trio, with Dietmar Fuhr (bass), Stéphane Huchard (drums)
2006	Eight Ball & White Horse	Intuition	Music for Saxophone Section (+doubles) and Piano Trio
2010	Mechanism	Pirouet	Solo piano
2013	Wheel & Wires	Fuhrwerk Musik	Trio, with Jesse van Ruller (guitar), Martijn Vink (drums)
2013	Ties & Loose Ends	Fuhrwerk Musik	With Marcus Bartelt (baritone sax), Stefan Schmid (tenor sax, clarinet), Wolfgang Fuhr (tenor sax), Frank Vaganee (alto sax, soprano sax), Christoph Möckel (alto sax), Matthias Bergmann, Volker Deglmann, Menzel Mutzke, Jan Schneider (trumpet), Klaus Heidenreich, Peter Schwatio, Felix Fromm, Ingo Lahme (trombone), Phillip Bramswig (guitar), Lucas Leidinger (piano), Dietmar Fuhr (bass), Fabian Arends (drums)
2014	Infinite Loop ∙ One	Unit Records	Duo, with Udo Moll (trumpet, live electronics)
2015	Lines & Crosscurrents	Toy Piano Records	Acoustic-Electric Quintet. With Markus Segschneider (pedal steel guitar, guitar), Niels Klein (tenor sax, clarinet, bass clarinet), David Helm (acoustic bass), Fabian Arends (drums)
2017	Pigs & Fairies	Toy Piano Records	Acoustic-Electric Trio. With Dietmar Fuhr (acoustic bass, electric bass), Fabian Arends (drums)
2018	Swallows & Swans	Toy Piano Records	Quintet with Australian vocalist Kristin Berardi, Matthew Halpin (ts,ss), Dietmar Fuhr (acoustic bass), Hans Dekker (drums)
2019	Reason & Temptation	Toy Piano Records	Quartet with Sebastian Gille (ts), David Helm (bass), Fabian Arends (drums)
2020	Florian Ross - Architexture	Naxos	Music for Wind Ensemble & Jazz Quartet
2020	Front & Center	Toy Piano Records	Florian Ross/ WDR Big Band
