= Broomriding =

Studio album by Alexander von Schlippenbach
- Released: 2003
- Recorded: September 21, 2002
- Studio: DeutschlandRadio Berlin
- Genre: Free improvisation
- Labels: Psi; 03.05
- Producers: Evan Parker, Martin Davidson

Alexander von Schlippenbach chronology
Hunting the Snake (2000)	Broomriding (2003)	Compression: Live At Total Music Meeting 2002 (2004)

Broomriding is an album by pianist Alexander von Schlippenbach. It was recorded on September 21, 2002, at DeutschlandRadio Berlin, and was released on CD in 2003 by Psi Records. On the album, Schlippenbach is joined by bass clarinetist Rudi Mahall, cellist Tristan Honsinger, and percussionist Paul Lovens. The recording features a seven-part suite by Schlippenbach, along with two compositions by Honsinger and two by Eric Dolphy.

== Reception ==
Professional ratings
Review scores
Source	Rating
All About Jazz	4.5/5 stars
AllMusic	4/5 stars
The Penguin Guide to Jazz	3.5/4 stars

In a review for AllMusic, Dan Warburton called the album "a joy from start to finish," and wrote: "the juxtaposition of tightly structured and freely improvised material adds depth and contrast... Schlippenbach is obviously in his element. The whole history of the 20th century piano is in there, from Teddy Wilson to Misha Mengelberg, from Debussy to Xenakis."

The authors of The Penguin Guide to Jazz Recordings described the recording as "an album to savour slowly," and stated: "at moments this recalls nothing more than a freer and more classically aligned version of Dolphy's work with bassist/cellist Ron Carter... this release... is immaculately recorded and mastered, allowing every delicate inflection... to come through."

John Eyles of All About Jazz commented: "At times, this is almost chamber improv. However, although the anarchy may be controlled, it is still definitely anarchy... The Schlippenbach pieces form the backbone of the album, providing a series of concentrated free improvisations that will reveal their merits over years, not months... By contrast to these, the other compositions almost come as light relief." AAJ's Andrey Henkin remarked: "this is actually an album of moods... this is avant-garde slowly and thoroughly percolated... The album as a whole can propel a listener who can then go back and assess the merit of the individual ideas presented. Certainly there are few better versions of Dolphy material extant than these."

Writing for One Final Note, Jay Collins stated that the album "focuses on 'compositions' grounded in free improv that venture into the churning, swishing, building of tensions that followers of these musicians have come to expect." He commented: "The record is one for fans of loose structures and/or Schlippenbach's work in general... it is a fine opportunity to check out what Schlippenbach has been up to lately."

== Track listing ==
1. "Broomriding 1" (Alexander von Schlippenbach) – 9:05
2. "Straight Up and Down" (Eric Dolphy) – 4:14
3. "Broomriding 2" (Alexander von Schlippenbach) – 8:10
4. "Broomriding 3" (Alexander von Schlippenbach) – 6:15
5. "Poetica" (Tristan Honsinger) – 4:54
6. "Broomriding 4" (Alexander von Schlippenbach) – 4:18
7. "Broomriding 5" (Alexander von Schlippenbach) – 7:29
8. "Attya" (Tristan Honsinger) – 4:27
9. "Broomriding 6" (Alexander von Schlippenbach) – 8:23
10. "Broomriding 7" (Alexander von Schlippenbach) – 5:52
11. "Something Sweet, Something Tender" (Eric Dolphy) – 4:28

== Personnel ==
- Alexander von Schlippenbach – piano
- Rudi Mahall – bass clarinet
- Tristan Honsinger – cello
- Paul Lovens – percussion
