= Steffen Schorn =

German jazz musician (born 1967)

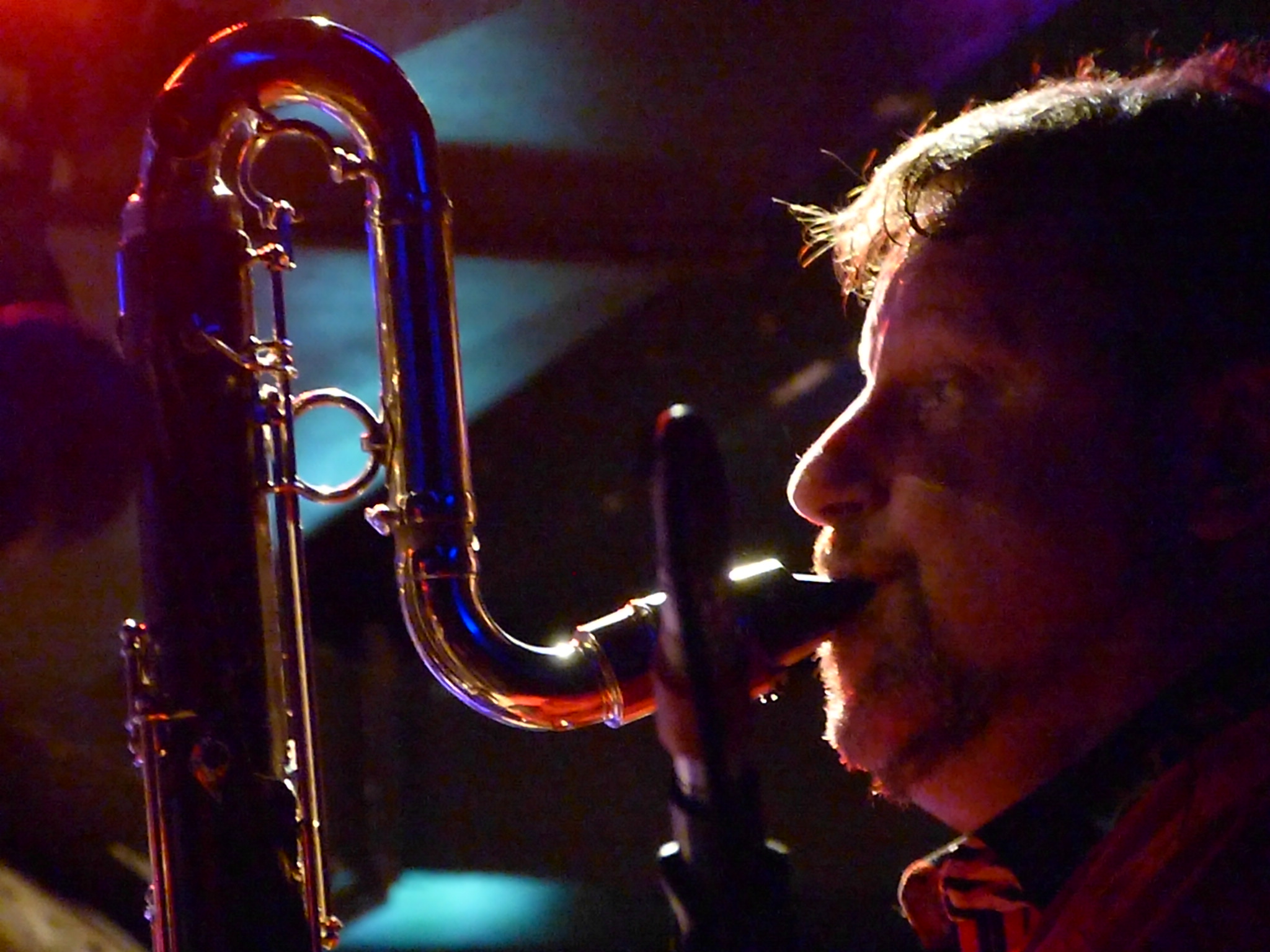
- at Subway, Germany, 2019
- Born: 1967 (age 57–58); Aalen, Germany
- Occupation(s): piccolo, bass flute, bass saxophone, contralto clarinet, contrabass clarinet, tubax
- Style: Jazz
- Website: www.steffenschorn.de

Steffen Schorn (born 26 September 1967 in Aalen) is a German jazz musician (saxophone and other woodwind instruments, composition). He is one of the most outstanding musicians and composers of German jazz and contemporary music. He is also the director of jazz department of Nürnberger Musikhochschule.

== Biography ==
Schorn started learning trumpet in 1973. Two years later, he began to compose and changed his instrument to saxophone as an autodidact. He was a member of Landesjugendjazzorchester Baden-Würtemberg from 1986 to 1990, a member of the Bundesjugendorchester in the field of classical music from 1986 to 1988 and a member of Bundesjugendjazzorchester from 1987 to 1991. From 1988 to 1992, he studied at the Hochschule für Musik Köln. At the same time from 1990 to 1996, he studied bass clarinet in Rotterdam with the focus on contemporary music.

Along with Klaus Graf, Schorn founded Timeless Art Orchester in 1990. Almost at the same time, he began his collaboration in the long lasting duo with Claudio Puntin. In this duo he performed also with Hermeto Pascoal in 1992. Since 1994, he has been a member of Kölner Saxophon Mafia. Since 1996, he has been the leader of Bobby Burgess Big Band Explosion. Since 1997, he has been baritone saxophonist in NDR Bigband.

Beside his main instrument, baritone saxophone, Schorn plays several other instruments such as piccolo, bass flute, bass saxophone, contralto clarinet, contrabass clarinet and tubax. Some of his compositions are beyond the jazz genre.

Schorn performed in The George Gruntz Concert Jazz Band with Joachim Kühn, Don Cherry, Sheila Jordan, Michael Brecker, Ray Anderson, Shirley Bassey, Uri Caine, Aki Takase, Gary Burton, Dianne Reeves, Al Jarreau, Natalie Cole, Nils Landgren, Dino Saluzzi, Klaus König, Lars Møller, Lukas Niggli and Nils Wogram. In 2006, he participated in the first performance of Infra für tiefe Töne von Johannes Fritsch.

Since 2001, he is a professor in the jazz department of Hochschule für Musik Nürnberg, where he teaches jazz composition, saxophone and playing in ensemble.

== Discography ==
- Steffen Schorn, Zurich Jazz Orchestra: "TO MY BELOVED ONES" (2022)
- Steffen Schorn, Zurich Jazz Orchestra: "DEDICATIONS" (2021)
- Susanne Kessel, Piano: „250 Piano Pieces for Beethoven“ – compilation 2
- Steffen Schorn, Norwegian Wind Ensemble: "HERMETO´S UNIVERSE" (2020)
- Raschèr Saxophone Quartet|Steffen Schorn|Roger Hanschel: "WAS WEITE HERZEN FÜLLT" (2019)
- Steffen Schorn, Zurich Jazz Orchestra: "THREE PICTURES" (2018)
- Steffen Schorn Ensemble "Cellular Structures" (2018)
- NDR Big Band, Nils Wogram: "Work Smoothly" (2018)
- Rayka Wehner: "Short Stories" (2018)
- NJ(J)O Young Metropole: "A Rosa" (2016)
- Ensemble Modern: "Ensemble Works II" Marcus Antonius Wesselmann (NEOS 2016)
- Ensemble Modern: "Changeover" Vito Zuraj (Wergo, 2015)
- Steffen Schorn Septet "Tiefenträume" (2015) (Pure Audio) CD & Blu-ray in Dolby Surround 5.1
- Steffen Schorn & Lars Andreas Haug: "Soul Twins" (Glacier Records) - CD & LP
- Balkan Clarinet Summit: "Many Languages one Soul" (Piranha Records)
- Norwegian Wind Ensemble: "Tiefenträume" (Norwind)
- Marcio Bahia: "Quebrando Tudo"
- Lars Andreas Haug Band: "Wazairo" (2019)
- Lars Andreas Haug Band: "Conrairo" (2015)
- Steffen Schorn´s Universe of Possibilities: "Universe of Possibilities" (JS 5044)
- Nguyen Le: "Signature Edition" (ACT)
- Lars Møller & The Orchestra: "Episodes"
- Dave Liebman & Brussels Jazz Orchestra: "Guided Dream"
- Steffen Schorn & SWR Big Band: "Die Besten aus Südwesten"
- Steffen Schorn & HR-Big Band: "Viva o Som - the Music of Hermeto Pascoal (hrmj 043-09)
- Schorn Puntin Duo: "Elephants' Love Affair" (NCC 8002)
- Schorn Puntin Duo: "Sketches for Woodwinds" (SONOTON SCD 274)
- Triosphere: "Triosphere" (Jazz'n'Arts Records - 2304) Preis der deutschen Schallplattenkritik
- Kölner Saxophon Mafia: "Nur nicht aus Liebe weinen" (2007)
- Kölner Saxophon Mafia: "Spaceplayer" (JHM 132) Preis der deutschen Schallplattenkritik
- Kölner Saxophon Mafia: "20 Jahre Saxuelle Befreiung" (JHM 115) Preis der deutschen Schallplattenkritik
- Kölner Saxophon Mafia: "Licence to Thrill" (JHM 100)
- Kölner Saxophon Mafia: "Place for Lovers" (JHM 82)
- Kölner Saxophon Mafia: "Levada" (V. I. F. Flötenquartett - NCC 8001)
- Lauer Large: "Konstanz Suite" (jazzwerkstatt 07)
- Lauer Large: "Less beat more" (jazzwerkstatt)
- Geir Lysne Ensemble: "The Grieg Code" (ACT )
- Martin Fondse´s Starvinsky Orkestar: "Fragrant Moondrops" (Basta 3091972)
- Vince Mendoza: "Blauklang" (ACT 9465-2)
- Nils Wogram Septet: "Complete Soul"
- Nils Wogram Septet: "Swing Moral"
- Nils Wogram Sextet/Octet: "Odd and Awkward" (ENJ-94162)
- Alejandro Sanchez Nonett+1: "Schärfe einer Sekunde" (J4E 4781)
- WDR-Big Band: "Cosmopolitean Greetings" (George Gruntz, Mark Murphy, Sheila Jordan, Ray Anderson)
- WDR-Big Band: "Carambolage" (Joachim Kühn, Daniel Humair, J. -F. -Kenny-Clark)
- WDR-Big Band: "JAZZPANA" (ACT 9212-2) (Vince Mendoza, Michael Brecker)
- Timeless Art Orchestra: "Without Words" (SDP 1005-1)
- German Jazz Orchestra: "First Take" (MONS 874669)
- Bobby Burgess Big Band Explosion: "Butter's Idea" (BLR 84069)
- Bach, Blech & Blues: "Klangwelten" (& Windsbacher Knabenchor)
- Bach, Blech & Blues: "Triptychon" (Berlin Classics 0094012BC)
- George Gruntz Concert Jazz Band: "Live at Jazzfest Berlin" (TCB99452)
- George Gruntz Concert Jazz Band: "Merryteria"
- George Gruntz Concert Jazz Band: "Expo Triangle" (MGB CD 6170)
- Peter Herbolzheimer RC&B: "Friends & Silhouettes" (KOALA)
- Peter Herbolzheimer RC&B: "25 Years-die 80er und 90er" (KOALA)
- Peter Herbolzheimer RC&B: "Colours of a Band" (MONS)
- NDR-Big-Band: "Ellingtonia" (ACT 9233-2)
- KölnMusik Big Band: "In Concert" (BPA 36453)
- Nils Landgren: "Paint it Blue" (ACT 9243-2)
- Roberto di Gioia: "Marsmobil - Strange World" (Act 9602-2)
- Paul Heller: "Kaleidoscope" (MONS)
- Martin Fondse Oktett "DE 8-Baan": "8xG" (Rollercoaster Music)
- Pe Werner: "Los"
- PUR: "Seiltänzertraum"
- Songlines & Maria da Fatima: "La Luna" (Musicom)

== Awards and honours ==
1991 Finalist European Jazz Competition (Schorn Puntin Duo)

1993 Golden Amadeus, 1. Prize Musik Kreativ Wettbewerb

1994 Förderpreis des Landes Nordrhein-Westfalen für junge Künstler

1994 Southern Comfort's Jazzmusician of the Year

1999 Jazz Prize of the German State Baden-Württemberg

2002 Preis der Deutschen Schallplattenkritik (German Record Award) (Kölner Saxophon Mafia)

2003/04 1. Prize "JazzArt" with TRIOSPHERE

2004 Preis der Deutschen Schallplattenkritik (German Record Award) (Kölner Saxophon Mafia)

2009 WDR Jazz Preis (North West German Radio Jazz Award) for composition

2010 Golden Bobby (Verband Deutscher Tonmeister) for "Tiefenträume" - best surround-production 2010 for the BR radio team
