= Main (band) =

British ambient band formed in 1991

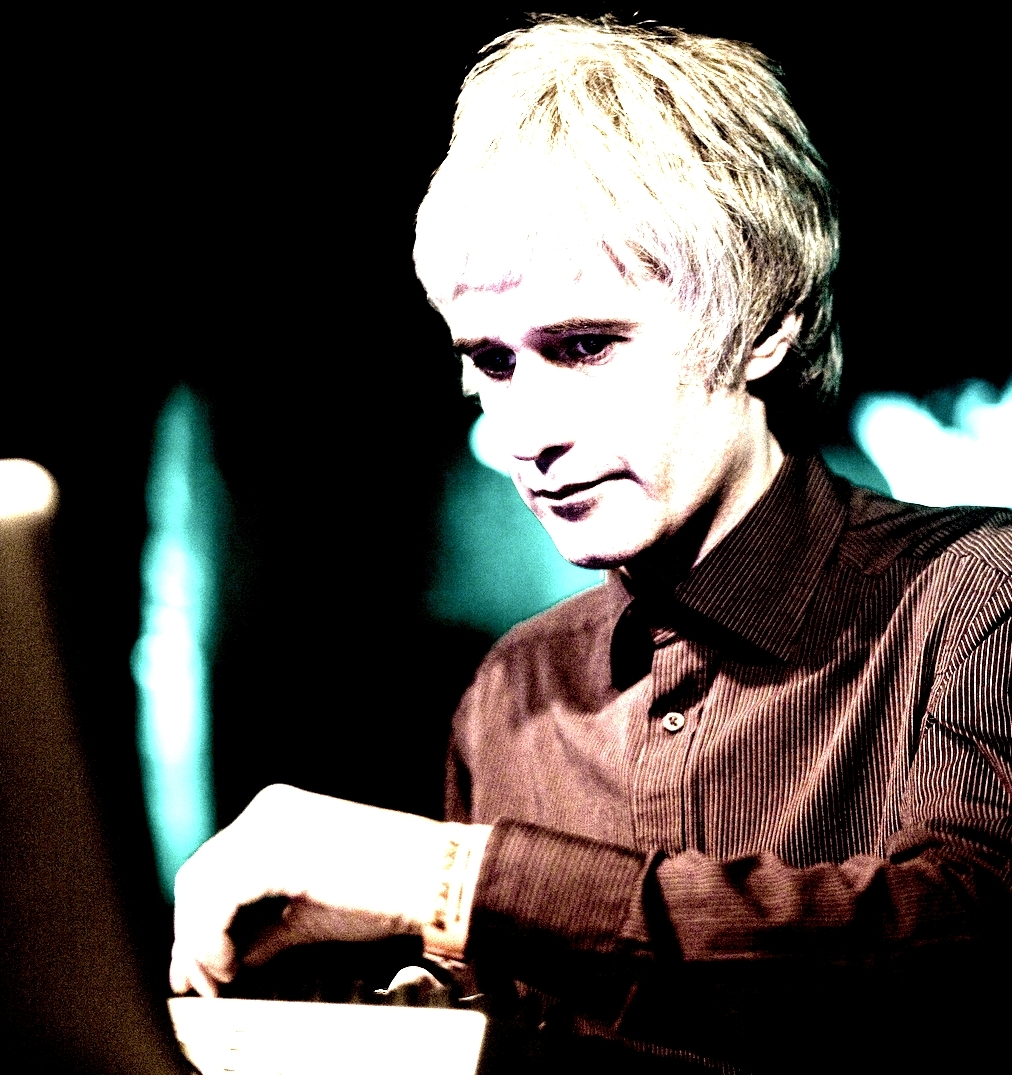
- Hampson performing in 2010

Background information
- Origin: Britain
- Genres: Drone, dark ambient, post-rock, electroacoustic music
- Years active: 1991 – present
- Labels: Situation Two, Beggars Banquet Records, Sub Rosa, K-Raa-K, Staalplaat
- Members: Robert Hampson; Stephan Mathieu
- Past members: Scott Dowson

Main were a British band formed in 1991 by guitarists Robert Hampson and Scott Dowson, both formerly of the English rock band Loop. Drawing on that group's experimentation with drones and guitar texture, the duo moved further into ambient sound, eventually abandoning traditional percussion and rhythm altogether. They released a number of albums and EPs to critical praise in the 1990s. Dawson left the group in 1996.

In 2006, Hampson announced that Main had effectively been disbanded in favour of his solo work. In October 2010, he announced that he would be reactivating Main as a more collaborative process with other sound artists. In 2011, the German composer Stephan Mathieu joined Hampson for a current incarnation of the project.

== Discography ==
=== Singles, EPs ===
- Hydra (12" single 1991)
- Calm (12" EP 1992)
- Dry Stone Feed (12" mini LP/CD 1992)
- Firmament (CD 1993)
- Core (7" single 1994) – limited edition of 300 copies, later released on the Ligature CD
- Ligature – Remixes (12" EP 1994)
- Firmament II (CD 1994)
- "Coderays" (7" single 1995) – limited edition of 100 copies
- Hertz 1 – Corona (12"/mini CD 1995)
- Hertz 2 – Terminus (12"/mini CD 1995)
- Hertz 3 – Maser (12"/mini CD 1995)
- Hertz 4 – Haloform (12"/mini CD 1995)
- Hertz 5 – Kaon (12"/mini CD 1995)
- Hertz 6 – Neper (12"/mini CD 1995)
- Firmament III (EP/CD 1996)
- Deliquescence (CD 1997) – live
- Firmament IV (EP/CD 1998)
- Transiency (mini CD – 2003)
- Ablation (Editions Mego – 2013)

=== Albums ===
- Motion Pool (3LP/CD 1994)
- Hydra-Calm (LP/CD 1995) – re-issue of "Hydra" and "Calm", plus one inedit
- Ligature – Remixes (CD 1995) – re-issue, contains three extra tracks (the "Core" 7" single)
- Hz (3LP/2CD 1996) – re-issue of the whole "Hertz Project"
- Firmament III & IV (3 cd 1999) – re-issue of the Firmament III and Firmament IV EPs plus Deliquecence
- Tau (CD – 2002)
- Exosphere Exosphere (CD – 2003)
- Surcease (2006)

== See also ==
- List of ambient music artists
