= Monk's Casino =

Live album by Alexander von Schlippenbach
- Released: 2005
- Recorded: June 19 & 20, 2003 and February 24 & 25, 2004 at A-Trane, Berlin
- Genre: Jazz
- Length: 66:16
- Label: Intakt 100
- Producer: Patrik Landolt

Alexander von Schlippenbach chronology
The Bishop's Move (2003)	Monk's Casino (2005)	Aki Takase/Alexander Von Schlippenbach/DJ Illvibe (2005)

Monk's Casino is a live album by German free jazz pianist Alexander von Schlippenbach featuring the complete compositions of Thelonious Monk recorded in Germany in 2003-04 for the Intakt label. According to the liner notes by critic John Corbett, Monk's Casino is the first ever comprehensive recording project to include all Monk's songs.

== Reception ==
Professional ratings
Review scores
Source	Rating
Allmusic	3.5/5 stars
Penguin Guide to Jazz	👑

The Allmusic review by Rick Anderson awarded the album 3 1/2 stars out of five, stating, "The irreverence with which he approaches Monk's music is something that Monk himself would surely have appreciated -- and yet there's a constant and deep undercurrent of loving admiration running beneath every bar he plays. This set would not make a very good introduction to Monk's music; newcomers are more likely to find it baffling than enlightening. But those already familiar with the music will hear Schlippenbach's interpretations as a breath of fresh, if sometimes astringent, air. Highly recommended".

The Penguin Guide to Jazz awarded the album a "Crown" signifying a recording that the authors "feel a special admiration or affection for".

All About Jazz review stated "Does the world need yet another glorifying and adulatory Monk project? The answer to that interrogative is as subjective as any other aesthetic question. But when the results convey as much clever creativity and unflagging brio as this industrious Intakt offering the inclination to argue against the enterprise withers easily in the mind"

== Track listing ==
All compositions by Thelonious Monk

Disc One:

1. "Thelonious" - 3:18
2. "Locomotive" - 1:37
3. "Trinkle-Tinkle" - 4:10
4. "Stuffy Turkey" - 0:44
5. "Coming on the Hudson" - 3:40
6. "Intro Bemsha Swing" - 3:29
7. "Bemsha Swing/52nd Street Theme" - 5:10
8. "Pannonica" - 1:36
9. "Evidence" - 4:25
10. "Misterioso/Sixteen/Skippy" - 10:05
11. "Monk's Point" - 1:23
12. "Green Chimneys/Little Rootie Tootie" - 5:21
13. "San Francisco Holiday" - 1:20
14. "Off Minor" - 2:23
15. "Gallop's Gallop" - 5:35
16. "Crepuscule with Nellie" - 2:17
17. "Hackensack" - 3:56
18. "Consecutive Second's" - 2:47

Disc Two:

1. "Brilliant Corners" - 4:14
2. "Eronel" - 3:36
3. "Monk's Dream" - 2:19
4. "Shuffle Boil" - 2:46
5. "Hornin' In" - 5:21
6. "Criss Cross" - 3:19
7. "Introspection" - 4:14
8. "Ruby, My Dear" - 0:58
9. "In Walked Bud" - 4:22
10. "Let's Cool One/Let's Call This" - 3:53
11. "Jackie-ing" - 2:45
12. "Humph" - 3:11
13. "Functional" - 0:53
14. "Work/I Mean You" - 3:53
15. "Monk's Mood" - 3:21
16. "Four in One/Round About Midnight" - 6:21
17. "Played Twice" - 5:37
18. "Friday the 13th" - 1:24
19. "Ugly Beauty" - 2:45
20. "Bye-Ya/Oska T." - 0:48

Disc Three:

1. "Bolivar Blues/Well You Needn't" - 2:48
2. "Brake's Sake" - 1:22
3. "Nutty" - 2:41
4. "Who Knows" - 2:28
5. "Blue Hawk/North of the Sunset/Blue Sphere/Something in Blue" - 1:40
6. "Boo Boo's Birthday" - 4:31
7. "Ask Me Now" - 5:12
8. "Think of One" - 2:29
9. "Raise Four" - 0:58
10. "Japanese Folk Song/Children's Song/Blue Monk" - 5:35
11. "We See" - 3:11
12. "Bright Mississippi" - 2:41
13. "Reflections" - 1:48
14. "Five Spot Blues" - 1:29
15. "Light Blue" - 0:59
16. "Teo" - 3:47
17. "Rhythm-a-ning" - 5:57
18. "A Merrier Christmas" - 0:41
19. "Straight, No Chaser/Epistrophy" - 6:43

== Personnel ==
- Alexander von Schlippenbach - piano
- Axel Dörner - trumpet
- Rudi Mahall - bass clarinet
- Jan Roder - bass
- Uli Jennessen - drums
