= Swinging the Bim =

Live album by Alexander von Schlippenbach Trio
- Released: October 17, 2000
- Recorded: November 20, 1998 at the Bimhuis, Amsterdam
- Genre: Free jazz
- Length: 99:46
- Label: FMP 114/115
- Producer: Alexander von Schlippenbach & Paul Lovens

Alexander von Schlippenbach chronology
Complete Combustion (1998)	Swinging the Bim (2000)	2x3=5 (2000)

Swinging the Bim is a live album by German free jazz pianist Alexander von Schlippenbach's Trio with saxophonist Evan Parker and percussionist Paul Lovens recorded in Amsterdam in 1998 for the FMP label.

== Reception ==
Professional ratings
Review scores
Source	Rating
Allmusic	4.5/5 stars
Penguin Guide to Jazz	5/5 stars

The Allmusic review by Eugene Chadbourne awarded the album 4½ stars stating "Only a good jazz group could get away with something like this; so fear not, the Schlippenbach Trio is not just good, it is great. So here we have a great group in front of a demanding audience... After nearly three decades on the road, it is the group's best yet".

The Penguin Guide to Jazz nominated the album as part of its "Core Collection" of recommended jazz recordings.

All About Jazz stated "One hundred minutes dissipate in what seems like the blink of an eye and here’s where we have an edge over the Bimhaus audience. They were privy to the sounds at their origin and element of creation, but we have the ability to revisit them again and again. Rather than a fleeting episode lost to time the entire itinerary is available for scrutiny in whatever detail deemed necessary to the individual; a privilege that should not go unappreciated or underutilized"

== Track listing ==
All compositions by Alexander von Schlippenbach, Evan Parker and Paul Lovens

Disc One:

1. "Swinging the Bim - First Set" - 39:20

Disc Two:

1. "Swinging the Bim - Second Set" - 60:26

== Personnel ==
- Alexander von Schlippenbach - piano
- Evan Parker - soprano saxophone, tenor saxophone
- Paul Lovens - drums, percussion
