= Andrea Neumann (musician) =

German musician and composer

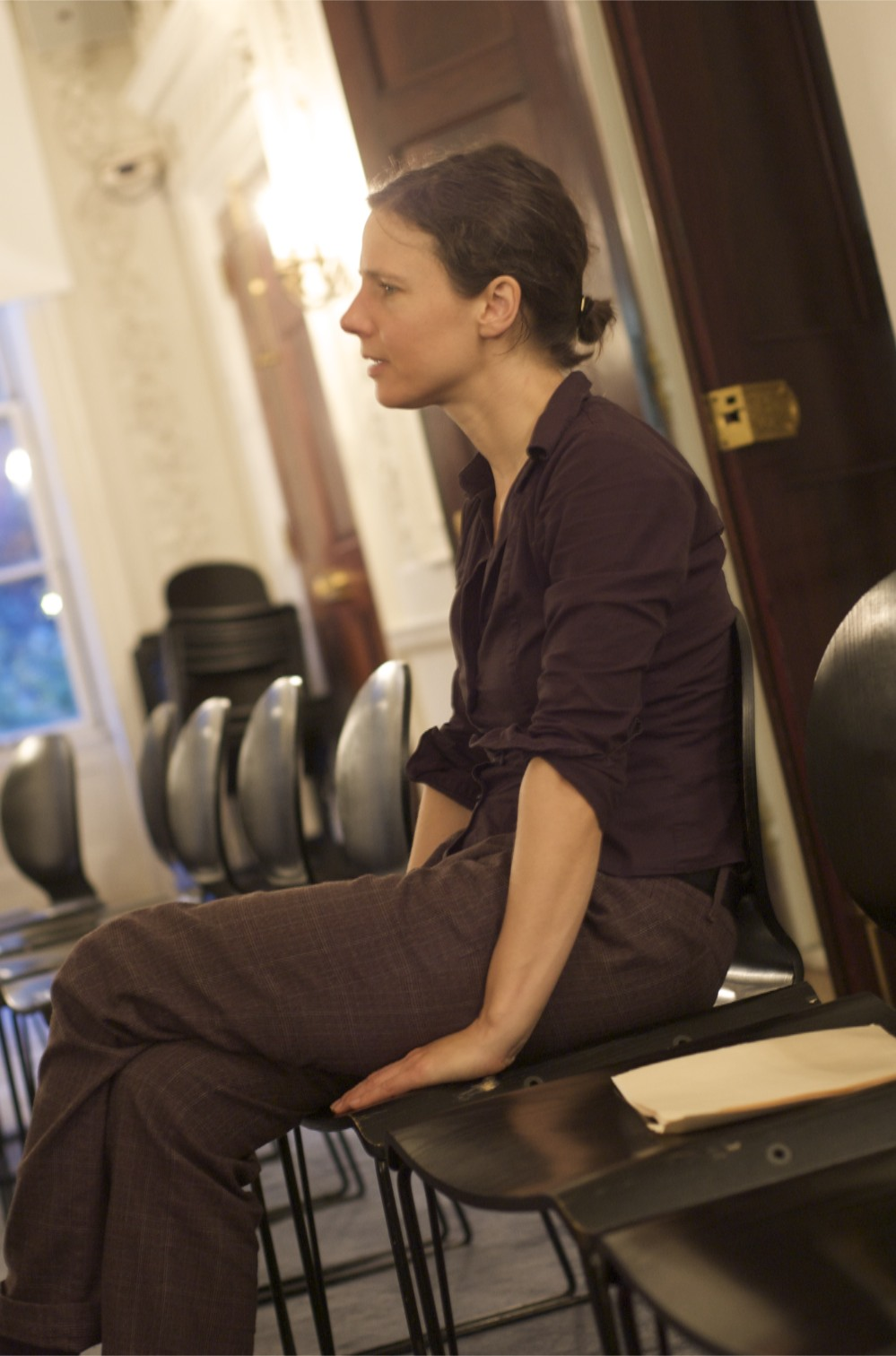
Andrea Neumann (Goethe-Institut, Boston, 2010)

Andrea Neumann is a German performing musician and composer. Andrea Neumann plays the "indoor piano", a modified piano of her own design.

== Life ==
Neumann studied piano at the Berlin University of the Arts. She has been a member of the Berlin improvisation scene since 1995. Since 2000, she has been a co-organizer and curator for the Labor Sonor series for experimental music, film and performance in Berlin. In 2008 she was a fellow at the Villa Aurora in Los Angeles. In 2008 she received an award from Prix Ars Electronica for the Video Performance of Videobrücke Berlin – Stockholm (5 Punkt 1) along with Sabine Ercklentz.

== Music ==
Neumann plays on an "indoor piano" made for her by the piano maker Bernd Bittmann. Inspired by Zeena Parkins' prepared harp, she designed the indoor piano to consist of only the soundboard and the strings. She prepares the piano with everyday objects, such as cutlery, razors, or a potato masher.

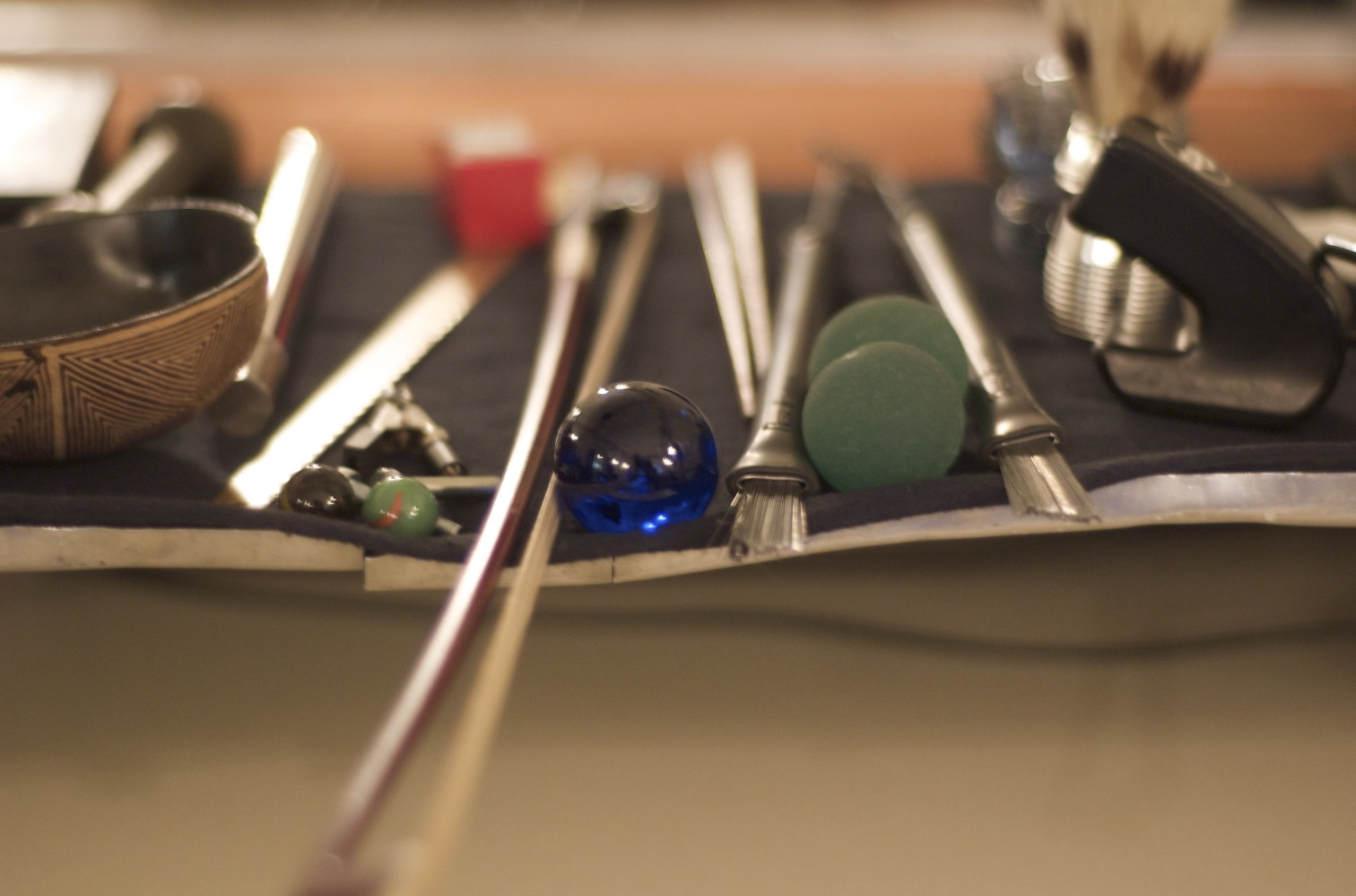
Objects, including a violin bow, marbles and an ebow, used by Andrea Neumann for playing her indoor piano.

Since the indoor piano does not have keys, it is played not only with fingers but also with various types of drum sticks, and violin bows. The instrument also incorporates a metal shelf and a mixer. The sounds are recorded with contact microphones and guitar pickups. The amplification of the instrument is adjusted during the performance.

In 2005 Neumann co-founded the artist collective Les Femmes Savantes. The collective calls itself a "composer-performer ensemble"; other members are Sabine Ercklentz, Ute Wassermann and Ana Maria Rodriguez.

In addition to compositions by the other members of Les Femmes Savantes, she also recorded works by John Cage, George Brecht, Heather Frasch, Robin Hayward, Phill Niblock, and Chiyoko Szlavnics. Neumann has also worked with musicians such as Burkhard Beins, Axel Dörner, Sabine Ercklentz, Annette Krebs, Ana Maria Rodriguez and Ignaz Schick.

== Works ==
- 4 Akteure, 2007
- Erosion, 2012
- Rencontre 2 for glissando flute and mixer feedback, 2013
- drehwurm, 2016 (in collaboration with Sabine Ercklentz)

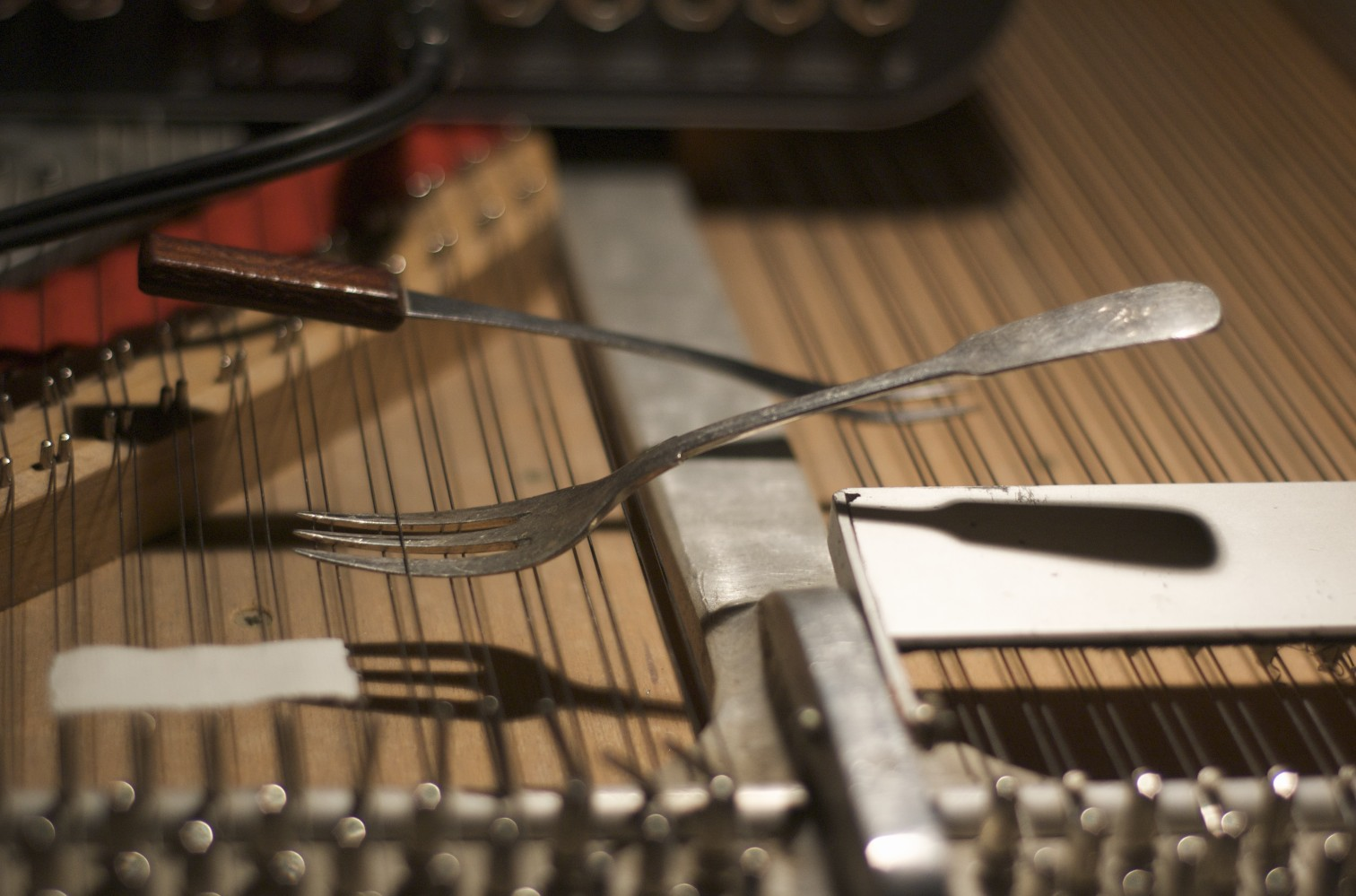
Andrea Neumann's indoor piano prepared with cutlery.

- Axel Dörner, Andrea Neumann, Sven-Åke Johansson Barcelona Series (hatOLOGY 2000)
- Andrea Neumann, Toshimaru Nakamura ATØN (Rossbin 2001)
- Ignaz Schick, Andrea Neumann Petit Pale (Zarek 2001)
- Andrea Neumann, Annette Krebs Rotophormen (Charhizma 2001)
- Andrea Neumann, Burkhard Beins Lidingö (Erstwhile Records 2002)
- Kaffe Matthews, Andrea Neumann, Sachiko M In Case of Fire Take the Stairs (Improvised Music From Japan 2002)
- Sabine Ercklentz, Andrea Neumann Oberflächenspannung (Charhizma 2003)
- Axel Dörner, Greg Kelley, Andrea Neumann, Bhob Rainey Thanks, Cash (Sedimental 2004)
- Andrea Neumann & Ivan Palacký Pappeltalks (Uceroz 2009)
- Sabine Ercklentz, Andrea Neumann LAlienation (Herbal International 2010)
- Sophie Agnel, Bertrand Gauguet, Andrea Neumann Spiral Inputs (Another Timbre 2011)
- Klaus Filip, Toshimaru Nakamura, Andrea Neumann, Ivan Palacký Messier Objects (Meenna 2012)
- Martin Tétreault, Andrea Neumann Live in St Henri (The Dim Coast 2012)
- Sven-Åke Johansson, Andrea Neumann, Axel Dörner Große Gartenbauausstellung (Olof Bright 2012)
- Andrea Neumann, Bonnie Jones Green Just As I Could See (Erstwhile Records 2012)
- Duo Vertex, Axel Dörner, Andrea Neumann Sustain Ability (Gigafon 2015)
- Andrea Neumann, Sharif Sehnaoui, Michael Thieke, Michael Vorfeld Nashaz (Al Maslakh 2016)
