= Smoke (Alexander von Schlippenbach and Sunny Murray album) =

Studio album by Alexander von Schlippenbach and Sunny Murray
- Released: 1990
- Recorded: October 6, 1989
- Studio: FMP-Studios, Berlin
- Genre: Free jazz
- Length: 1:10:39
- Label: FMP; CD 23
- Producer: Jost Gebers

Alexander von Schlippenbach chronology
Stranger Than Love (1985)	Smoke (1990)	Elf Bagatellen (1990)

Smoke is an album by pianist Alexander von Schlippenbach and drummer Sunny Murray. It was recorded on October 6, 1989, at FMP-Studios in Berlin, and was released in 1990 by FMP/Free Music Production.

== Reception ==
Professional ratings
Review scores
Source	Rating
AllMusic	4/5 stars
The Penguin Guide to Jazz	4/4 stars
Tom Hull – on the Web	B+

In a review for AllMusic, Thom Jurek stated that the album "reveals with startling clarity the inherent musical courage it takes to play freely with another musician you have never encountered... von Schlippenbach abdicates his normal responsibilities as a leader and becomes a collaborator. Murray, never really anybody's sideman, takes the reins and turns his rhythmic chops on in such a way that the pianist cannot help but to respond in a like manner... when it's over, in the silence, the listener will most assuredly sit for a while in disbelief at what just transpired."

The authors of The Penguin Guide to Jazz Recordings awarded the album a full 4 stars, calling it "an intriguing collaboration, in which both men hang up their 'free music' armour and get down to what sounds like a set of phantom standards."

Author Todd S. Jenkins called the recording session a "dream opportunity" with "appealing" results, and commented: "Murray's deliberate tuning of his drums plays a vital role in settings like this, permitting him to function as melodically as Schlippenbach's forceful piano approach casts him in a [Cecil] Tayloresque percussive role."

The authors of Jazz: The Rough Guide remarked: "After the furor of 1960s free jazz, we now have Smoke drifting over the scene. Schlippenbach and Murray have mellowed and there is a beguiling thoughtfulness and lyricism in this music."

== Track listing ==
1. "Smoke" (Schlippenbach, Murray) - 9:55
2. "Down the Mission" (Schlippenbach) - 19:17
3. "Trinkle Tinkle" (Thelonious Monk) - 3:09
4. "Akiko Ma Non Troppo" (Schlippenbach) - 7:22
5. "Angel Voice" (Murray) - 5:31
6. "Khumbu" (Schlippenbach) - 7:30
7. "Top Dogs Attack" (Murray) - 12:36
8. "The Shadow of the Man" (Murray) - 5:19

== Personnel ==
- Alexander von Schlippenbach – piano
- Sunny Murray – drums
