= Michael Thieke =

- Born: 1971 (age 54–55); Düsseldorf, Germany
- Genres: Jazz
- Occupation: Musician
- Instruments: clarinet, alto saxophone
- Website: www.michael-thieke.de//

Michael Thieke (1971 in Düsseldorf) is a German jazz clarinetist and alto saxophone player. Thieke moved to Berlin in 1993, where he studied at Berlin University of the Arts under Denney Goodhew, Kirk Nurock and Jerry Granelli. During the education, he appeared on the scene with the Swiss clarinet player Gregor Hotz and the band Billy Bang's Bobby.

In 1999, he founded the band Nickendes Perlgraas with Eric Schaefer and Michael Anderson. With this band, he gave numerous concerts and recorded two CDs.

He is also a member of Ullmann's The clarinet Trio. He published also a CD with the band Schwimmer (with Alessandro Bosetti, Sabine Vogel, Michael Griener).

Since 1999, Thieke lives also in Rome, where he works with the musicians like Luca Venitucci, Fabrizio Spera, Roberto Bellatalla, Antonio Borghini and Alberto Braida.
