= Rudi Mahall =

German jazz clarinetist

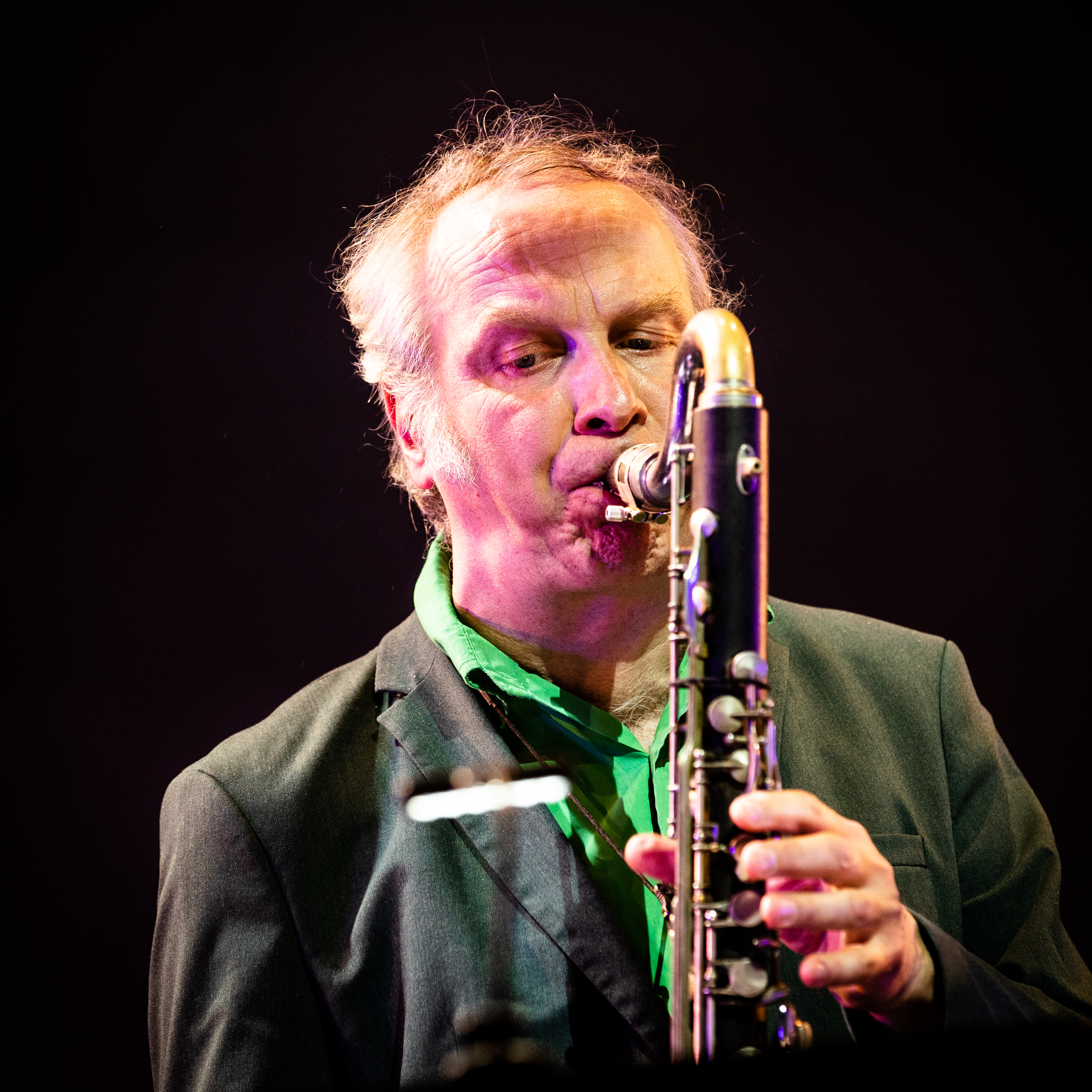
- Mahall at the Moers Festival 2018

Background information
- Born: September 23, 1966 (age 59)
- Origin: Nuremberg, West Germany
- Genres: Jazz
- Occupations: Musician, composer
- Instruments: Bass clarinet, clarinet
- Years active: 1988–present

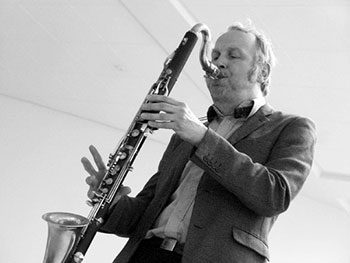
Rudi Mahall

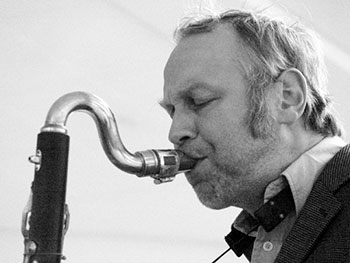
Rudi Mahall

Rudi Mahall (born December 23, 1966) is a contemporary jazz bass clarinetist.

While studying classical clarinet, Mahall shifted towards contemporary music, improvisation and jazz. He is, or was a member of following bands: Avantgardeband Die Hartmann 8, Der Rote Bereich (initially comprising Frank Möbus, Marty Cook, Jim Black and Henning Sievert), the Trio Tiefe töne für Augen und Ohren (with Sievert and Bill Elgart), Carlos Bicas Azul and Die Enttäuschung (amongst others with Axel Dörner, Jan Roder). He carried out several projects and published CDs with Aki Takase, about the work of Eric Dolphy and others. Mahall participated to Alexander von Schlippenbach's recording of the complete works of Thelonious Monk, published by a prestigious Swiss label, and he is a member of the Globe Unity Orchestra. Moreover, he performed with Conny Bauer, Lee Konitz, Barry Guy, Karl Berger, Paul Lovens, Sven-Åke Johansson, Radu Malfatti, Ed Schuller, Ray Anderson, Kenny Wheeler, Hannes Bauer and many others.

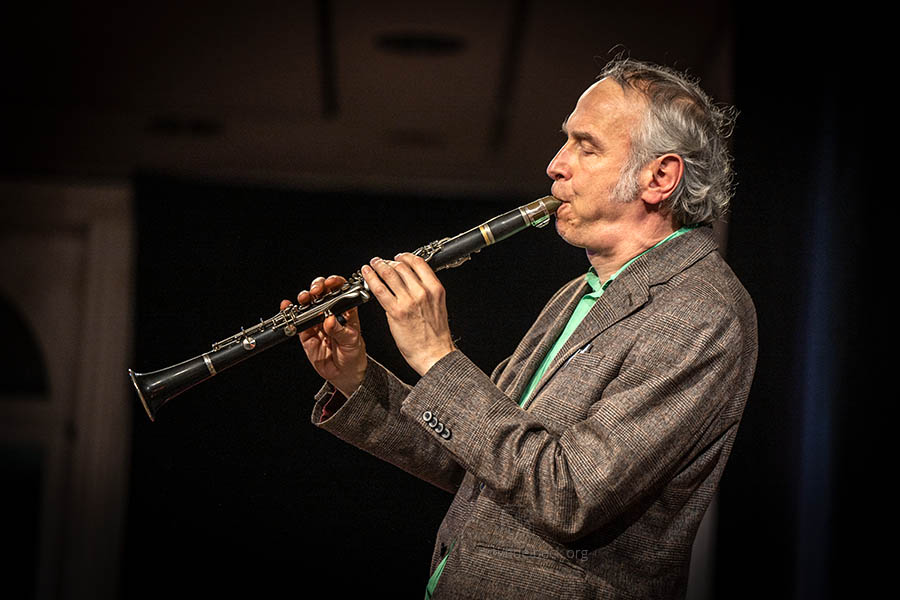
Rudi Mahall, 2020

Mahall performed at the Free Music Festival Jazz à Mulhouse in 2008, at the Moers Festival, the JazzFest Berlin, the Leverkusener Jazztage and jazz festivals in New York City, Amsterdam, München, Würzburg, Nürnberg, and he toured in Portugal, southern and eastern Africa.

== Discography ==
- Solo, Psi Records, 2006.
- Monk's Casino: Alexander von Schlippenbach, Axel Dörner, Rudi Mahall, Jan Roder, Uli Jenessen. Intakt Records, 2005.
- Broomriding: Alexander von Schlippenbach, Rudi Mahall, Tristan Honsinger, Paul Lovens. Psi, 2003.
- Contemporary Quartet Marcin Oles, Bartlomiej Oles, Rudi Mahall, Mircea Tiberian. Nottwo Records, 2002.
- with Juergen Wuchner et al.
  - Trio in Treptow, Rudi Mahall, Jürgen Wuchner, Uli Jennessen, Date unknown
  - Chambermusik, with Jürgen Wuchner Group, 1996
- with Aki Takase
  - "Evergreen" Duo, Intakt Records CD 152, 2009
  - Quartet: Aki Takase, Johannes Bauer, Tony Buck. Jazzwerkstatt CD 019, 2007
  - The Dessert Duo, 2004.
  - Aki Takase Plays Fats Waller: Aki Takase, Eugene Chadbourne, Nils Wogram, Rudi Mahall, Thomas Heberer, Paul Lovens, 2003.
  - St Louis Blues: Aki Takase, Rudi Mahall, Fred Frith, Nils Wogram, Paul Lovens, Enja Records, 2001.
  - Duet For Eric Dolphy, Enja Records, 1997
  - Live at Willisau Jazz Festival: Aki and The Good Boys (Aki Takase, Rudi Mahall, Tobias Delius, Johannes Fink, Heinrich Köbberling, Jazzwerkstatt 2008
  - Evergreen, Intakt, 2009
- Der Rote Bereich: Rudi Mahall, Frank Moebus & John Schröder
  - Live in Montreux, ACT Records, 2004
  - Love Me Tender, ACT Records, 2001
  - Drei, Jazz4Ever Records, 1998
  - Zwei
  - Eins
- Die Enttaeuschung: Rudi Mahall, Axel Dörner, Jan Roder, Uli Jennessen
  - 5, Intakt Records CD 166, 2009
  - 4, Intakt Records CD 125, 2007
  - Drei, Grob Records, 2007
  - Zwei, 2002
  - Eins
- Quartetto Pazzo: Rudi Mahall, Christof Thewes et al.
  - Melancholera JazzHausMusik, 2007.
  - Quartetto Pazzo JazzHausMusik, 2003.
- with ELEkTRO: ELEkTRO feat Rudi Mahall & Even Hermansen, 2014 (Blackout Music)
