= Nils Wogram =

German jazz trombonist

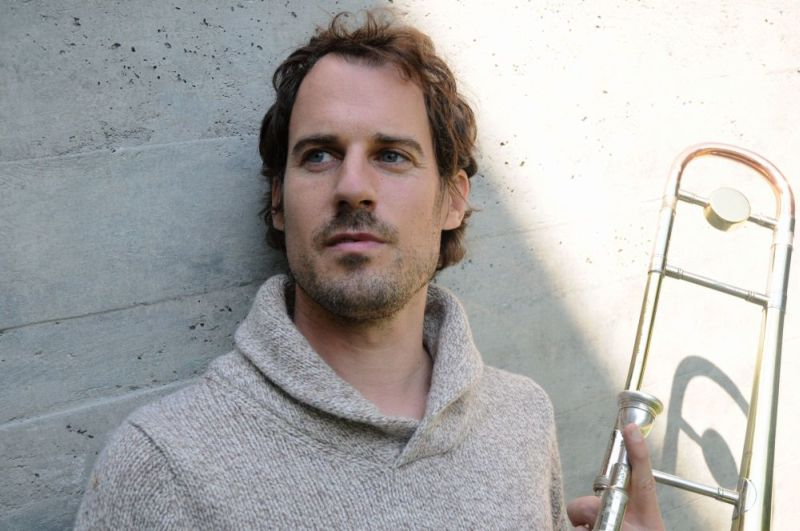
- Nils Wogram in 2013

Background information
- Born: 7 November 1972 (age 52); Braunschweig, Germany
- Genres: Jazz
- Occupation: Musician
- Instrument: Trombone
- Website: nilswogram.com

Nils Wogram (born 7 November 1972) is a jazz trombonist, composer and bandleader.

He began classical study at the age of fifteen. He was a member in the National German Youth Big Band, participated in classical competitions and formed his own bands at the age of 16. In 1992 he received a scholarship for The New School in New York City and stayed until 1994. During this time he released his debut album "New York Conversations" (1994) with his own Nils Wogram Quintett. Since then he has released more than 20 albums as a bandleader. In 1999 he graduated from Cologne University. In 2010 he started his own record label nwog-records. Nils Wogram's bands play exclusively his own music, and other ensembles commission pieces by him. He currently lives in Zürich and teaches at the Lucerne School of Music in Switzerland.

Besides his own bands, Wogram was involved with other band projects. From 1994 to 2006 he played in the German Jazz Quintet Underkarl of double bass player Sebastian Gramss and was a member of the German Jazz-Rap Band Jazzkantine for several years. Nils Wogram played with Kenny Werner, Rudi Mahall, Eugene Chadbourne and today plays with the Aki Takase Quintet.

== Discography ==
- 1994 Nils Wogram Quintett, New York Conversations
- 1996 Nils Wogram Quartett, Roundtrip (enja)
- 1998 Nils Wogram Quartett, Speedlife (enja)
- 1999 Nils Wogram und Simon Nabatov, As we don’t know it (konnex records)
- 2000 Nils Wogram und Conny Bauer, Serious Fun (cimp)
- 2001 Nils Wogram Sextet / Oktett, Odd and Awkward (enja)
- 2001 Nils Wogram Quartett, Root 70 (mit Hayden Chisholm, Matt Penman, Jochen Rückert) (2nd floor)
- 2002 Xavier Garcia-Gianni Gebbia-Nils Wogram, pronto!
- 2002 Nils Wogram und Simon Nabatov, The Move (btl)
- 2002 Nils Wogram und Simon Nabatov, Starting A Story (act records)
- 2003 Underkarl, Second brain
- 2003 Nils Wogram Root 70, Getting Rooted (enja)
- 2003 Nils Wogram Quartett, Construction Field (altrisuoni)
- 2004 Nils Wogram Nostalgia Trio, Daddy's Bones (intuition)
- 2005 Nils Wogram Septett, Swing Moral
- 2005 Nils Wogram und Simon Nabatov, The move (between the lines)
- 2006 Nils Wogram Root 70, Fahrvergnügen (Intuition)
- 2007 Nils Wogram and the NDR Bigband, Portrait Of A Band (enja)
- 2007 Nils Wogram und Simon Nabatov, Jazz Limbo (leo records)
- 2008 Nils Wogram Nostalgia Trio, Affinity (intuition)
- 2008 Nils Wogram Root 70, On 52nd 1/4 Street (Intuition)
- 2009 Nils Wogram's Lush, Pretty Good News (unit records)
- 2010 Nils Wogram Root 70, Listen To Your Woman (nwog)
- 2011 Nils Wogram und Simon Nabatov, Moods And Modes (nwog)
- 2011 Nils Wogram Nostalgia Trio, sturm und drang (nwog)
- 2012 Nils Wogram Septet, complete soul (nwog)
- 2013 Nils Wogram Root 70 with Strings, riomar (nwog)
- 2014 Nils Wogram vertigo trombone quartet, developing good habits (nwog)
