= Axel Dörner =

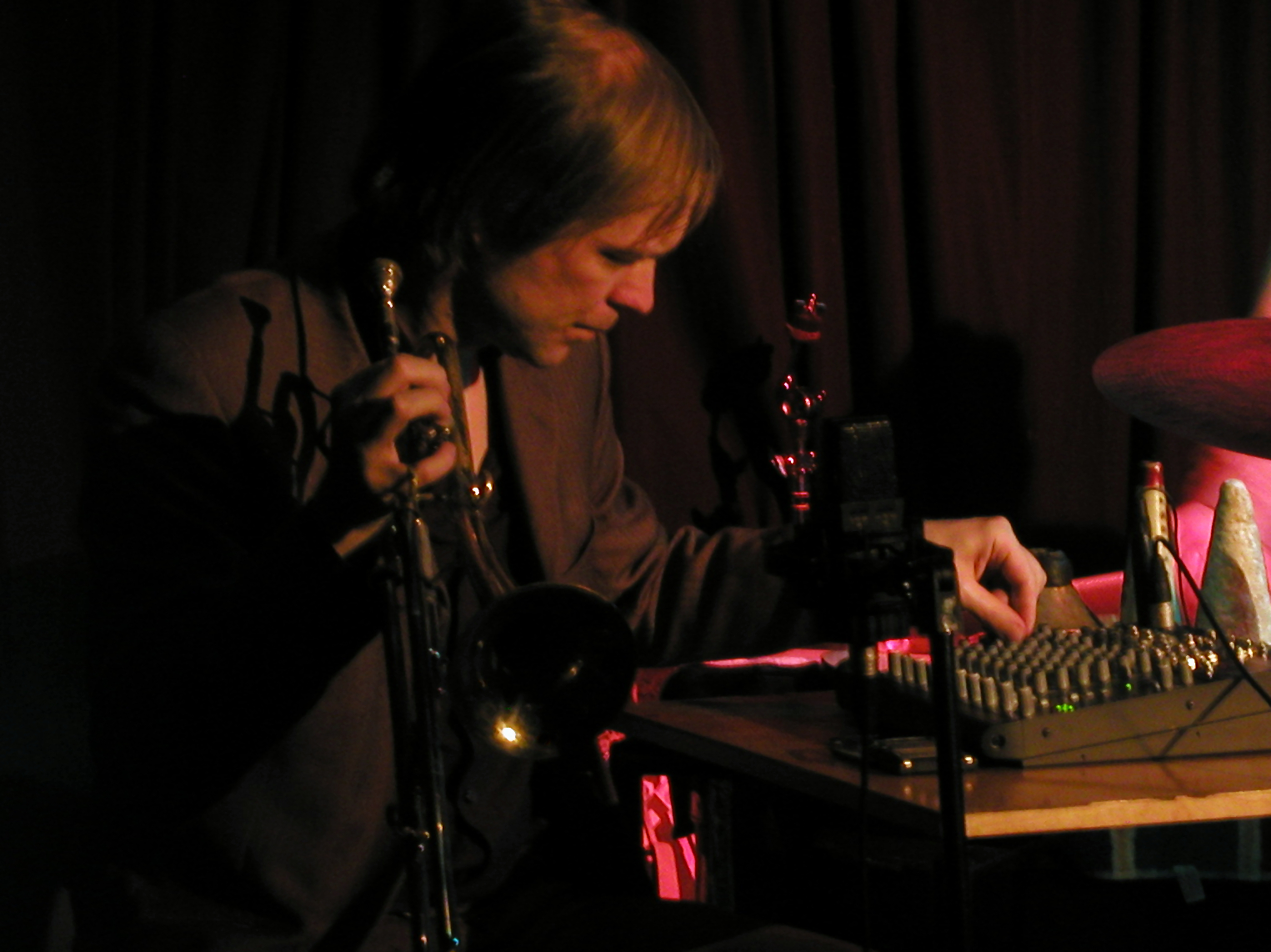
- Dörner in 2007

Background information
- Born: 26 April 1964 (age 62); Cologne, Germany
- Origin: Germany
- Genres: Free improvisation
- Occupations: Musician, composer
- Instruments: Trumpet, piano
- Website: axeldoerner.org

Axel Dörner (born 26 April 1964 in Cologne, Germany) is a German trumpeter, pianist, and composer.

== Biography ==
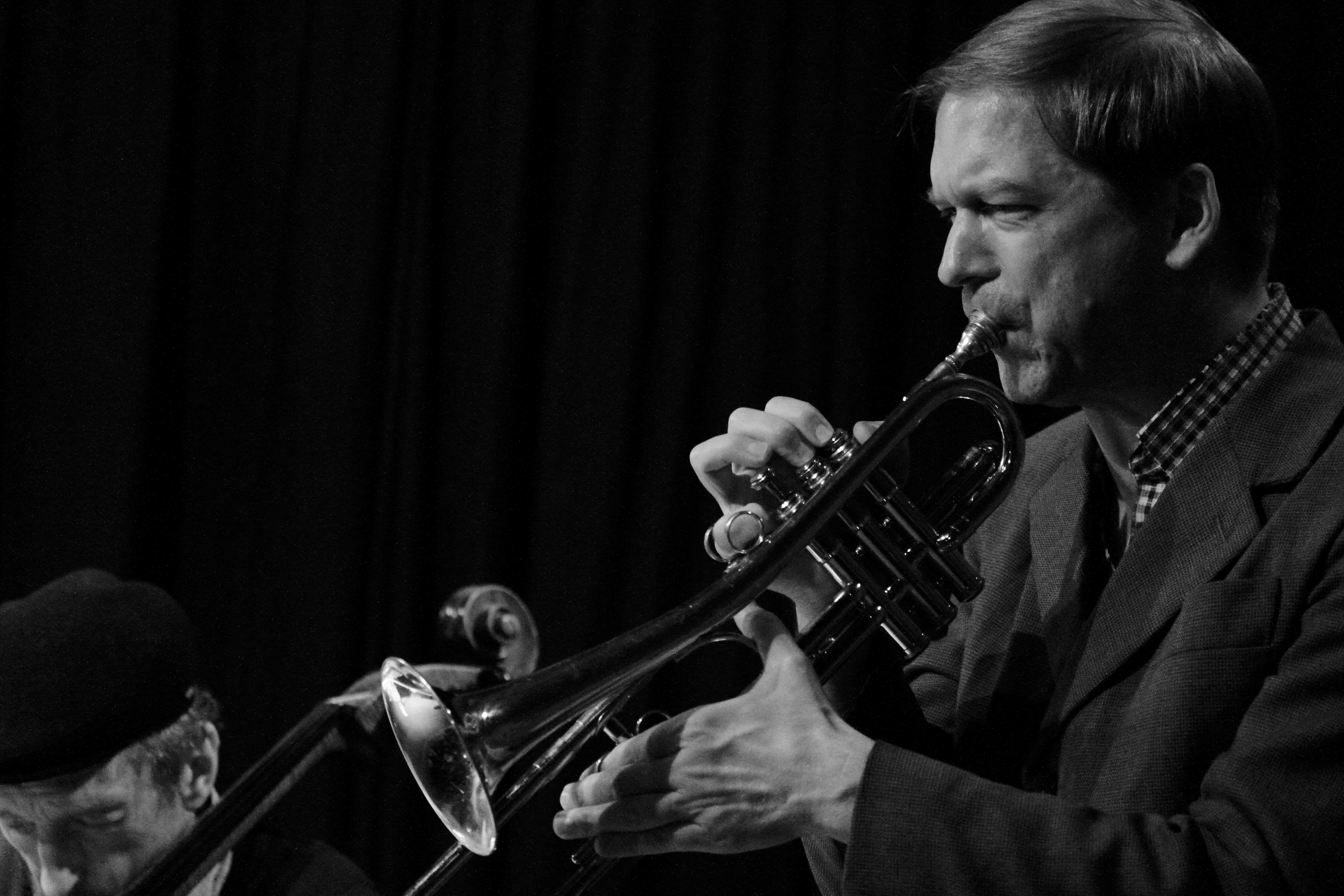
Dörner with 'HDRS' in 2015.

Dörner studied piano in the Dutch town Arnhem (1988–89) and at the Music Academy in Cologne (1989–1996). From 1991 he studied trumpet with Malte Burba, and during his studies he collaborated with trumpeter Bruno Light as the Street Fighters Duo. The duo expanded to form the Street Fighters Quartet and the Street Fighters Double Quartet, with members including Matthias Schubert, Bruno Leicht, and Claudio Puntin. He formed the Axel Dörner Quartet with Frank Gratkowski, Hans Schneider, and Martin Blume, and played with saxophonist Matthias Petzold on the albums Lifelines and Psalmen Und Lobgesänge.

Dörner has lived in Berlin since 1994 and is an integral part of the Berlin scene of new improvisational and experimental music. Besides playing solo and in his trio TOOT (with Phil Minton and Thomas Lehn), he has played with artists such as Otomo Yoshihide and in groups such as Die Anreicherung (with Christian Lillinger, Håvard Wiik, and Jan Roder), Ig Henneman Sextet, Ken Vandermark's Territory-Band, Hedros (with Mats Gustafsson, Günter Christmann, Barry Guy, and others), and the London Jazz Composers' Orchestra. A versatile musician, he is also able to work in idiomata such as bebop. He played on pianist Alexander von Schlippenbach's album Monk's Casino, featuring interpretations of the complete compositions of Thelonious Monk.

== Selected discography ==
=== As leader ===
- 2001: Trumpet (A Bruit Secret)
- 2007: Sind (absinthRecords)

=== As sideman ===
With Joshua Abrams

- Cipher (Delmark, 2003)

With Alexander von Schlippenbach

- Monk's Casino (Intakt, 2005)

With Alexander von Schlippenbach and the Berlin Contemporary Jazz Orchestra

- The Morlocks and Other Pieces (FMP, 1994)
- Live in Japan '96 (DIW, 1997)

With Aki Takase and Alexander von Schlippenbach

- So Long, Eric! (Intakt, 2014)
