= Scott (surname) =

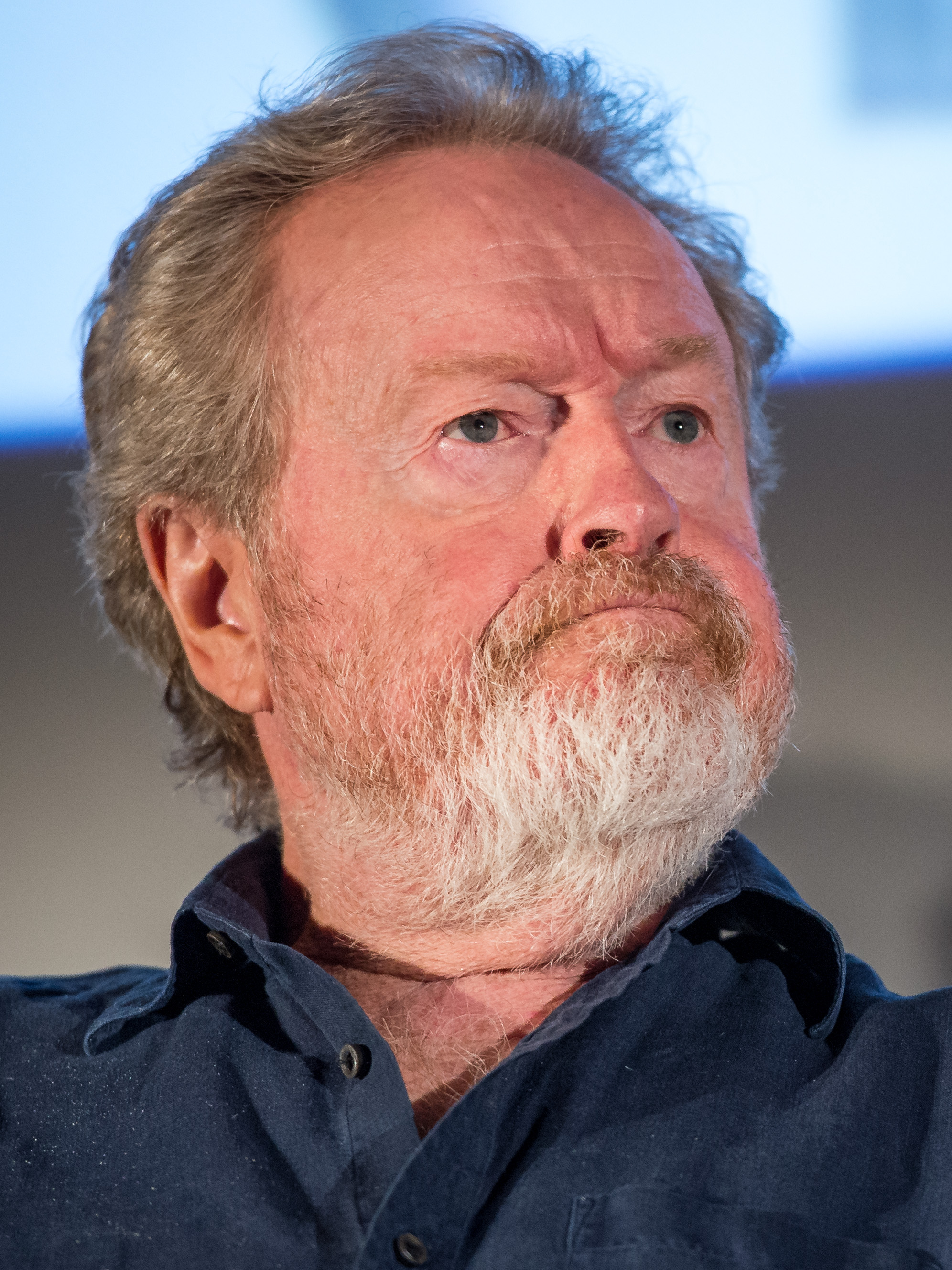
- Ridley Scott
- Pronunciation: /skɒt/
- Language: English

Scott is a surname of English and Scottish origin. It is first attributed to Uchtredus filius Scoti, who is mentioned in the charter recording the foundation of Holyrood Abbey and Selkirk in 1120, as well as to the border Riding clans who settled Peeblesshire in the 10th century and to the family lineage of the Duke of Buccleuch.

== Etymology and history of the surname ==
Auld Wat of Harden by Tom Scott. A romanticized image of notorious border raider and clan member Walter Scott of Harden.

The surname Scott (Scot, Scotts, Scutt, Scotter), as opposed to its earlier unrelated usage, first appears in the 12th century and derives from the Anglo-Scottish border and its medieval border clans. Scott is one of the twelve most common surnames in Scotland. Clan Scott was one of the most powerful of the Riding clans of the Scottish borders and rose to power in the turbulent, often violent region, where they conducted fierce raids and battles with neighbouring clans.

The surname appears in Kent, England by the 14th century, the family of Scot's Hall being a notable example. Descent is thought to be from Alexander de Balliol or William de Balliol le Scot, brothers of John de Balliol King of Scotland, or from retainers of King David I of Scotland who held lands from the Earl of Huntingdon. By the 17th century, the name is first recorded in Ireland as a surname. There is no evidence that the surname originated with the first Gaelic settlers from Ireland, despite its use as a marker for Gaels by the Romans. Moreover, in the medieval period, the surname was associated with the Kingdom of Scotland rather than the early Irish medieval Gaelic kingdom of Dalriada, whose inhabitants did not refer to themselves as such, even though separate sources claim that the name was derived from the Scots who invaded Dalriada (Argyll) from Ireland.

== People ==
- Reginald Scot, author of "The Discoverie of Witchcraft"
- Scot's Hall, a landed family based in Kent, England
- Scott of the Antarctic, epithet for Captain Robert Falcon Scott (1868–1912), British Royal Navy officer and Antarctic explorer
- Scott (baseball), a 19th-century American professional baseball player whose given name is unknown
- Scott Baronets of Great Barr, a baronetage of the United Kingdom created in 1806
- Aaron Scott (footballer) (born 1986), New Zealand footballer
- Abron Scott (born 1965), American serial killer
- Adam Scott (golfer) (born 1980), Australian golfer
- Adam Scott (born 1973), American actor
- Adrian Gilbert Scott (1882–1963), English ecclesiastical architect
- Adrienne Williams Scott, American ophthalmologist
- Alexander Walker Scott (1800–1883), entomologist
- Alfred Angas Scott (1875–1923), British motorcycle designer, founder of the Scott Motorcycle Company
- Allan Scott (disambiguation), multiple people
- Amber Scott, Australian ballet dancer
- Andrew Scott (disambiguation), multiple people
- Ann London Scott (1929–1975), American feminist
- Anne Firor Scott (1921–2019), American historian
- Barbara Ann Scott (1928–2012), Canadian figure-skater
- Barbara Starr Scott (1939–2020), Cherokee Nation politician
- Barry Scott (disambiguation), multiple people
- Beckie Scott (born 1974), Canadian cross-country skier
- Ben Scott (disambiguation), multiple people
- Benjamin Scott (1814–1892), Chamberlain of London
- Bill Scott (disambiguation), multiple people
- Bobby Scott (U.S. politician) (born 1947), American politician from Virginia
- Bon Scott (1946–1980), Scottish-born Australian rock musician, AC/DC
- Boston Scott (born 1995), American football player
- Brandon Scott (born 1981), American actor, voice actor and producer
- Bruce Scott (disambiguation), multiple people
- Burke Scott (1933–2025), American basketball player and coach
- Byron Scott (born 1961), American basketball coach
- Byron N. Scott (1903–1991), American lawyer and politician
- Camilla Scott (born 1961), Canadian actress and television hostess
- Campbell Scott (born 1961), American actor, director, producer and voice artist
- Carlo Scott (born 1980), South African footballer
- Christian Scott (disambiguation), multiple people
- Clara H. Scott (1841–1897), American composer, hymnwriter and publisher
- Clement Scott (1841–1904), English theatre critic and writer
- Clive Scott (disambiguation), several people
- Corey Scott (1968–1997), American motorcycle stunt rider
- Cyril Scott (1879–1970), English composer, writer, and poet
- Da'Mari Scott (born 1995), American football player
- Dana Scott (born 1932), American mathematician
- Daniel Scott (disambiguation), multiple people
- Danielle Scott-Arruda (née Scott) (born 1972), American Olympic indoor volleyball player
- Darrell Scott (born 1959), American songwriter
- Darryl Scott (born 1968), American baseball player and coach
- David Scott (disambiguation), multiple people
- Deborah Lynn Scott (born 1954), American costume designer
- Delontae Scott (born 1997), American football player
- Desiree Scott (born 1987), Canadian soccer player
- Devon Scott (born 1958), American actress
- Devon Scott (basketball) (born 1994), American basketball player
- Dick Scott (disambiguation), multiple people
- Doug Scott (1941–2020), English mountaineer
- Douglas Scott (1926–1996), writer of thrillers often based during the Second World War
- Dred Scott (c. 1799–1858), American slave, subject of famous 19th-century US Supreme Court case
- Drew Scott (born 1978), Canadian television personality
- Duncan Campbell Scott (1862–1947), Canadian bureaucrat, poet, and writer
- Durand Scott, Jamaican-American basketball player for Maccabi Ashdod B.C. of the Liga Leumit
- Édouard-Léon Scott de Martinville (1817–1879), French printer and bookseller, inventor of the phonautograph, the earliest known sound recording device
- Edward Scott (disambiguation), multiple people
- Eleanor Scott (archaeologist), British archaeologist
- Elisabeth Scott (1898–1972), British architect
- Elizabeth Scott (disambiguation), multiple people
- Elmon Scott (1853–1921), associate justice and chief justice of the Washington Supreme Court
- Emily Scott (DJ) (born 1983), Australian model, disk jockey, record producer, and television personality
- Eric Scott (disambiguation), multiple people
- Esther Mae Scott (1893–1979), Mississippi blues singer
- Eva Mae Fleming Scott (1926–2019), American pharmacist, businesswoman, and politician
- Ernest Scott (1867–1939), Australian historian
- Eugenie Scott (born 1945), American physical anthropologist
- Frederick Scott (disambiguation), multiple people
- Gary Scott (disambiguation), multiple people
- Gee Scott Jr. (born 2000), American football player
- Gene Scott (1929–2005), American pastor, religious broadcaster, and teacher
- George Scott (disambiguation), multiple people
- Gregory K. Scott (1948–2021), American judge
- Gustavus Scott (1753–1800), American lawyer and public official from Maryland
- Gustavus H. Scott (1812–1882), United States Navy admiral
- Guy C. Scott (1863–1909), American jurist
- H. Scott Landry (born 1948 or 1949), American politician
- Hal Scott (1923–2010), American sportscaster
- Hardie Scott (1907–1999), United States congressman from Pennsylvania
- Harold Scott (disambiguation), multiple people
- Helena Scott (1832–1920), Australian artist
- Herbert Scott (disambiguation), multiple people
- Hermon Hosmer Scott (1909–1975), American hi-fi engineer
- Hew Scott (1791–1872), Scottish church minister and author
- Hillary Scott (singer) (born 1986), American singer-songwriter, Lady Antebellum
- Hillary Scott (actress) (born 1983), American actress
- Holly Scott, American actress, known for The Shopping Bag Lady
- Hugh Scott (1900–1994), American lawyer and United States congressman and senator from Pennsylvania
- Hugh L. Scott (1853–1934), United States Army general and Chief of Staff
- Ian Scott (Ontario politician) (1934–2006), Canadian politician from Ontario, Attorney-General of Ontario from 1985 to 1990
- Isaac Scott (musician) (1945–2001), American blues guitarist and singer
- Jackson Robert Scott (born 2008), American child actor
- Jacqueline Scott (1931–2020), American actress
- Jake Scott (disambiguation), multiple people
- Jaleel Scott (born 1995), American football player
- Jeremy Scott (1961–1994), American actor and model
- James Scott (disambiguation), multiple people
- Jamie Scott (basketball) (born 1994), American–Canadian women's player
- Jan Scott (1914–2003), American production designer and art director
- Jan Scott-Frazier (1965–2024), American animator and translator
- Jason Scott (disambiguation), multiple people
- Jerry Scott (curler), American curler
- Jill Scott (born 1972), American singer-songwriter
- Jill Scott (footballer) (born 1987), English footballer
- Jim Scott (footballer) (born 1940), Scottish footballer
- Jimmy Scott (1925–2014), American jazz vocalist
- J. K. Scott (born 1996), American football player
- Jo-Vaughn Scott (born 1995), American rapper and actor known professionally as Joey Badass
- Joanna Scott (born 1960), American author, professor at the University of Rochester
- John Scott (disambiguation), multiple people
- Josh Scott (born 1985), English footballer
- Josh Scott (basketball) (born 1993), American basketball player
- Josiah Scott (disambiguation), multiple people
- Julia H. Scott (1809–1842), American poet
- Julia Ralph Scott (born 1982), Scottish footballer
- Julius Samuel Scott Jr. (1925–2019), American minister, sociologist, community leader, teacher, and academic administrator
- Julius Sherrod Scott III (1955–2021), American scholar of slavery and Caribbean and Atlantic history
- Kathryn Leigh Scott, American actress and writer
- Katie Scott (born 1958), British art historian
- Kaye Scott, Australian boxer
- Kenneth Scott (disambiguation), multiple people
- Larry Scott (bodybuilder) (1938–2014), American bodybuilder
- Lation Scott (1893–1917), African American lynching victim
- Laurence Henry Scott (1896–?), British soldier
- Lawrence Scott (born 1943), Trinidadian writer
- Lee Scott (disambiguation), multiple people
- Lefty Scott (1915–1964), American baseball player
- Lewis Allaire Scott (1759–1798), American politician, New York Secretary of State, 1789–93
- Lizabeth Scott (1922–2015), American actress
- Lottie B. Scott (1936–2025), American civic leader and civil rights advocate
- Mabel Julienne Scott (1892–1976), American actress
- MacKenzie Scott (born 1970), American novelist and philanthropist
- Maddy Scott, Canadian person who has been missing since 2011
- Madison Scott (born 2001), American basketball player
- Margaret Scott (disambiguation), multiple people
- Maria Isabel Hylton Scott (1889–1990), Argentine zoologist, malacologist and teacher
- Marion Scott (1877–1953), English violinist, musicologist, writer, music critic, editor, composer and poet
- Martha Scott (1912–2003), American actress
- Mary Scott (disambiguation), multiple people
- Matthew Scott (disambiguation), multiple people
- Maurice D. G. Scott (1895–1918), British World War I flying ace
- Michael Scott (disambiguation), multiple people
- Miles Scott (disambiguation), multiple people
- Montagu Scott (1818–1900), English Conservative politician, Member of Parliament for East Sussex from 1874 to 1880
- Montague Scott (1835–1909), Australian artist
- Morrys Scott (born 1970), Welsh footballer
- Munro Briggs Scott (1889–1917), Scottish botanist and British officer
- Naomi Scott (born 1993), English actress and singer
- Nell Scott, American politician
- Nick Scott (disambiguation), multiple people
- Niles Scott (born 1995), American football player
- Nora E. Scott (1905–1994), Scottish Egyptologist
- Olive Scott (1924–2007), English paediatric cardiologist
- Olivia Scott (born 2001), Canadian soccer player
- Otho Scott (died 1864), American politician and lawyer
- Pamela Scott Wilkie (born 1937), British artist
- Patrick Scott (disambiguation), multiple people
- Percy Scott (1853–1924), British admiral and naval gunnery pioneer
- Peter Scott (disambiguation), multiple people
- Phil Scott (1900–1983), English boxer
- Phil Scott, American politician, Governor of Vermont
- Philippa Scott (1918–2010), British champion of wildlife conservation
- Pippa Scott (1935–2025), American actress
- Rachel Scott (1981–1999), American murder victim, the first shot in the Columbine massacre
- Rachel Scott (women's education reformer) née Cook (1848–1905), British women's education reformer, who promoted equality for women.
- Rachel Wacholder Scott (1975–), American beach volleyball player
- Randolph Scott (1898–1987), American actor
- Ray Scott (disambiguation), multiple people
- Raymond Scott (1908–1994), American composer, band leader, pianist, engineer, recording studio maverick, and electronic instrument inventor
- Richard Scott (disambiguation), multiple people
- Rick Scott (born 1952), American businessman and politician, US Senator, Governor of Florida
- Ridley Scott (born 1937), English film director and producer, brother of Tony
- Robert Scott (disambiguation), multiple people
- Rodney Scott (actor) (born 1978), American actor
- Rodney Scott (pitmaster) (born 1971). American chef and barbecue pitmaster
- Romano Scott (born 1985), South African footballer
- Ronald Scott (disambiguation), multiple people
- Ronald Bodley Scott (1906–1982), English physician
- Samantha Scott, New Zealand director
- Samuel Gilbert Scott (c. 1813–1841), American daredevil
- Seann William Scott (born 1976), American film actor
- Sonny Scott, American country blues guitarist, singer and songwriter
- Selina Scott (born 1951), English television news presenter
- Septimus Edwin Scott (1879–1965), English painter
- Shaye Scott, American social media personality
- Sherie Rene Scott (born 1967), American actress, singer, and writer
- Sol Scott (born 2007), British gymnast
- Sophie Scott, Pseudonym of a German inventor
- Stephen Scott (writer) (1948–2011), American Anabaptist writer
- Stevie Scott (born 2000), American football player
- Stuart Scott (1965–2015), American sports journalist
- Tanner Scott (born 1994), American baseball player
- Tayler Scott (born 1992), South African baseball player
- Thomas Scott (disambiguation), multiple people
- Tim Scott (born 1965), American politician, US Senator from South Carolina
- Tom Scott (presenter) (born 1984 or 1985), English presenter, podcaster, YouTuber
- Tommy Scott (coach) (1907–1962), American college sports coach
- Tony Scott (1944–2012), English film director and producer, brother of Ridley
- Travis Scott (disambiguation), multiple people
- Trent Scott (born 1994), American football player
- Tully Scott (1857–1924), associate justice and chief justice of the Colorado Supreme Court
- Ty Scott (born 1999), American football player
- Tyler Scott (disambiguation), multiple people
- Vernon Scott (born 1997), American football player
- Victor Scott (born 1962), American football player
- Victor Scott II (born 2001), American baseball player
- Walter Scott (disambiguation), multiple people
- Wendell Scott (1921–1990), American racing driver and first African-American to win in NASCAR's highest level
- Wendi Michelle Scott (born 1975), American criminal convicted of abusing her daughter in a case of Münchausen syndrome by proxy
- Wilbert Scott (1939–2025), American football player
- Willard Scott (1934–2021), American actor, author, media personality, clown, and comedian
- William Scott (disambiguation), multiple people
- Winfield Scott (1786–1866), United States Army general and US presidential candidate
- Zachary Scott (1914–1965), American actor
- Zavier Scott (born 1999), American football player

== Fictional characters ==
- Alan Scott, Golden Age Green Lantern
- Michael Scott (The Office), character in The Office
- Montgomery "Scotty" Scott, character in Star Trek
- Jason Lee Scott, a character in the American TV show Power Rangers
- Lucas Scott, Nathan Scott, Haley James Scott and James Lucas Scott, characters in One Tree Hill on CW

== See also ==
- Scotty (disambiguation), contains list of people with given name and surname Scotty
- Scottie (disambiguation), contains list of people with given name Scottie
- Scot (given name)
- Scot (surname)
