= Scott =

Scott may refer to:

== People ==
- Scott (surname), including a list of people and fictional characters with the surname
- Scott (given name), including a list of people and fictional characters with the given name
- Clan Scott, Scottish clan, historically based in the Scottish Borders
- Judge Scott (disambiguation)
- Justice Scott (disambiguation)

== Places ==
=== Canada ===
- Scott, Quebec, municipality in the Nouvelle-Beauce regional municipality in Quebec
- Scott, Saskatchewan, a town in the Rural Municipality of Tramping Lake No. 380
- Rural Municipality of Scott No. 98, Saskatchewan

=== United States ===
- Scott, Arkansas
- Scott, Georgia
- Scott, Indiana
- Scott, Louisiana
- Scott, Missouri
- Scott, New York
- Scott, Ohio
- Scott, Wisconsin (disambiguation) (several places)
- Fort Scott, Kansas
- Great Scott Township, St. Louis County, Minnesota
- Scott Air Force Base, Illinois
- Scott City, Kansas
- Scott City, Missouri
- Scott County (disambiguation) (various states)
- Scott Mountain (disambiguation) (several places)
- Scott River, in California
- Scott Township (disambiguation) (several places)

=== Elsewhere ===
- 876 Scott, minor planet orbiting the Sun
- Scott (crater), a lunar impact crater near the south pole of the Moon
- Scott Conservation Park, a protected area in South Australia
- Scott Base, a New Zealand research station on Ross Island in Antarctica

=== Lists ===
- Scott Point (disambiguation)

== Companies ==
- H. H. Scott, Inc., vintage tube hi-fi manufacturer
- Scott Paper Company, formerly an American manufacturer of paper-based personal care products
- Scott Sports, Swiss manufacturer of bicycles, winter equipment, motorsports gear and sportswear
- The Scott Motorcycle Company, English manufacturer of motorcycles and light engines for industry
- W. R. Scott (publisher), a defunct American publisher

== Music ==
- Scott (album), debut solo album by Scott Walker, followed by Scott 2, Scott 3, and Scott 4
- "Scott", song by Deathray, on the album Deathray
- "Scott", song by Simian Mobile Disco, on the album Attack Decay Sustain Release

== Ships ==
- HMS Scott, three ships of the Royal Navy
- USS Scott, several ships of the US Navy

== Other ==
- Scott-T transformer or Scott connection, a type of circuit used to produce two-phase electric power
- Scott, one of two probes on NASA's Deep Space 2 mission; named after polar explorer Robert Falcon Scott.
- NBR Scott Class, a class of steam locomotive on the North British Railway
- Scott catalogue, stamp catalogue by the Scott Publishing Co.
- Scott House (disambiguation)
- Scott–Marcondes Cesar–São José dos Campos, Brazilian cycling team

== See also ==
- Scot (disambiguation)
- Scott Free (disambiguation)
