= Travis (given name) =

- Gender: Male

Origin
- Origin: Anglo-Norman Old French: traverser
- Meaning: to cross over
- Region of origin: Normandy
- Surname turned into given name.

Travis is mainly an English masculine given name of French origin. It is derived from the word "traverser" or "to cross", and was given to toll collectors who stood by a bridge or crossing.

== People ==
- Travis Adams (born 2000), American baseball player
- Travis Alabanza (born 1995), British artist, writer and theatre maker
- Travis Alexander (1977–2008), American salesman who was murdered by his ex-girlfriend
- Travis Allen (born 1973), American politician
- Travis Baldree (born 1977), American author, audiobook narrator, and video game designer
- Travis Banton (1894–1958), American costume designer
- Travis Barker (born 1975), American drummer for the rock band Blink-182
- Travis Beacham (born 1980), American screenwriter
- Travis Bell (born 1998), American football player
- Travis Best (born 1972), American basketball player
- Travis Blankenhorn (born 1996), American baseball player
- Travis Boak (born 1988) Australian rules footballer
- Travis Brody (born 1984), professional American football quarterback
- Travis Brown (disambiguation), several people
- Travis Browne (born 1982), American mixed martial artist
- Travis Burke (born 2003), American football player
- Travis Clark (born 1985), American musician
- Travis Chapman (born 1978), American baseball player and coach
- Travis Childers (born 1958), former U.S. representative from Mississippi
- Travis Clayton (born 2001), English-American football player
- Travis Coleman (born 1980), American football player
- Travis d'Arnaud (born 1989), American baseball player
- Travis Demeritte (born 1994), American baseball player
- Travis Dermott (born 1996), National Hockey League player
- Travis Dye (born 1999), American football player
- Travis Elborough (born 1971), British author
- Travis Etienne (born 1999), American football player
- Travis Feeney (born 1992), American football player
- Travis Fimmel (born 1979), Australian model and actor
- Travis Fulgham (born 1995), American football player
- Travis Garland (born 1989), American singer and dancer
- Travis Glover (born 2000), American football player
- Travis Green (born 1970), Canadian professional ice hockey coach and player
- Travis Greene (born 1984), American gospel singer
- Travis Haley (known as Lexxi Foxxx), American bass player for the rock band Steel Panther
- Travis Hamonic (born 1990), professional ice hockey player
- Travis Head (born 1993), Australian cricketer
- Travis Henry (born 1978), American football running back
- Travis Homer (born 1998), American football player
- Travis Hunter (born 2003), American football player
- Travis Ishikawa (born 1983), American baseball player
- Travis Jankowski (born 1991), American baseball player
- Travis Johnstone (born 1980), Australian rules footballer
- Travis Jones, multiple people
- Travis Jonsen (born 1996), American football player
- Travis Kelce (born 1989), American football tight end
- Travis Knight (born 1973), American filmmaker and animator
- Travis Konecny (born 1997), Canadian hockey forward
- Travis Kvapil (born 1976), American former NASCAR driver
- Travis Lakins Sr. (born 1994), American baseball player
- Travis Leslie (born 1990), American professional basketball player
- Travis Ludlow (born 2003), English aviator
- Travis Lutter (born 1973), American mixed martial artist
- Travis Marx (born 1977), American mixed martial artist
- Travis McCoy (born 1981), musician and singer
- Travis McElroy (born 1983), American podcaster
- Travis Meeks (born 1979), lead singer, guitarist and songwriter for acoustic rock band Days of the New
- Travis Mills (born 1989), American singer, rapper and actor
- Travis Nelson, multiple people
- Travis Nicklaw (born 1993), American-born Guamanian international footballer
- Travis Pastrana (born 1983), American motorsports athlete
- Travis Pearson (born 1971), American football player
- Travis Perry (born 2005), American basketball player
- Travis Reed (born 1979), American basketball player
- Travis Rinker (born 1968), American association football (soccer) player
- Travis Scott (disambiguation), several people
- Travis Shaw (born 1990), American baseball player
- Travis Sinniah, admiral, commander of the Sri Lanka Navy from August to October 2017
- Travis Swaggerty (born 1997), American baseball player
- Travis Switzer (born 1992), American football coach
- Travis Sykora (born 2004), American baseball player
- Travis Tritt (born 1963), American country musician
- Travis Vokolek (born 1998), American football player
- Travis Wall (born 1987), contemporary dance teacher
- Travis Walton (born 1953), an American alleged alien abductee
- Travis Warech (born 1991), American-German-Israeli basketball player for Israeli team Hapoel Be'er Sheva
- Travis Wear (born 1990), American basketball player
- Travis Willingham (born 1981), American voice actor
- Travis Wilson (wide receiver) (born 1984), American football wide receiver
- Travis Zajac (born 1985), Canadian National Hockey League player

== Fictional characters ==
- Travis Bell, a character in Killer7
- Travis Bickle, protagonist of the film Taxi Driver
- Travis Mayweather, in the American TV series Star Trek: Enterprise
- Travis McGee, created by John D. MacDonald
- Travis Nash, from the Australian soap opera Home and Away
- Travis Touchdown, the main character in the No More Heroes series
- Travis, antagonist of the British TV series Blake's 7
