= Scot (disambiguation) =

A Scot is a member of an ethnic group indigenous to Scotland, derived from the Latin name of Gaelic raiders, the Scoti.

Scot may also refer to:

- MV Scot, a Norwegian coaster
- Scot and lot, phrase common in the records of English medieval boroughs, applied to householders who were assessed for a borough tax
- Social construction of technology (SCOT), theory within the field of Science and Technology Studies
- SCOT, an enzyme encoded by the OXCT1 gene
- S.C.O.T., a rap album

== People ==
- Scot (given name)
- Scot (surname)

== See also ==
- Scotus (disambiguation)
- Scott (disambiguation)
- Scotch (disambiguation)
- Scut (disambiguation)
