= Frederick Scott =

Frederick, Fred, Freddie or Fredrick Scott may refer to:

== Sportsmen ==
- Fred Scott (footballer, born 1874) (1874–1969), Australian rules centre half-forward for Essendon and Carlton
- Fred Scott (footballer, born 1885) (1885–1937), Australian rules player for Fitzroy
- Freddie Scott (footballer) (1916–1995), English winger
- Frederick Scott (field hockey) (1933–2017), British Olympian in 1956 and 1960
- Freddie Scott (American football, born 1952), American wide receiver
- Freddie Scott (American football, born 1974), American wide receiver, son of above

== Writers ==
- Fred Newton Scott (1860–1931), American educator and rhetorician
- Frederick George Scott (1861–1944), Canadian clergyman, poet and author
- Freddie Scott (1933–2007), American singer-songwriter known for "Hey, Girl"
- Fredrick D. Scott (born 1984), American financial consultant and motivational speaker

== Others ==
- Frederick A. Scott (1866–1957), American attorney and legislator in Connecticut
- J. Fred Scott (1892–1982), Canadian army officer
- Fred Scott (actor) (1902–1991), American singing cowboy in western films
- Freddie Scott (British Army officer) (1922–2011), British Army officer in World War II
- Frederick Scott (designer) (1942–2001), English innovator and creator of Supporto chair
- Fredrick Demond Scott (born 1994), American perpetrator of the Indian Creek serial killings
