= Henry Scott =

Henry Scott may refer to:

- Henry Scott, 1st Earl of Deloraine (1676–1730), Scottish peer and army officer
- Henry Scott, 3rd Duke of Buccleuch (1746–1812), Scottish peer
- Henry Scott (mayor) (1836–1913), mayor of Adelaide, 1877–1878 and Legislative Council member, 1874–1891
- Henry Scott (English cricketer) (1851–1941), cricketer in the 1880s
- Henry Milne Scott (1876–1956), Fijian lawyer, businessman, politician and cricketer
- Tup Scott (Henry James Herbert Scott, 1858–1910), Australian cricketer
- Sir Henry Harold Scott (1874–1956), British pathologist and expert on tropical medicine
- Henry Lawrence Scott (1882–1971), British Indian Army officer
- Henry P. Scott, politician and public official in Mississippi
- Henry Young Darracott Scott (1822–1883), Royal Engineers officer
- Henry W. Scott (1866–1935), American judge
- Henry Lee Scott (1814–1886), U.S. Army officer
- Lord Henry Scott (1868–1945), Scottish cricketer and British Army officer
- Louis Scott (runner, born 1889) (Henry Louis Scott, 1889–1954), American gold medalist at the 1912 Olympics

== See also ==
- Harry Scott (disambiguation)
