= Andrew Duncan (physician, born 1773) =

British physician and professor

Andrew Duncan, the younger
- Born: 10 August 1773; Edinburgh, Scotland
- Died: 13 May 1832 (aged 58)
- Occupations: physician and academic

Andrew Duncan, the younger (10 August 1773 – 13 May 1832) was a British physician and professor at the University of Edinburgh.

== Life ==
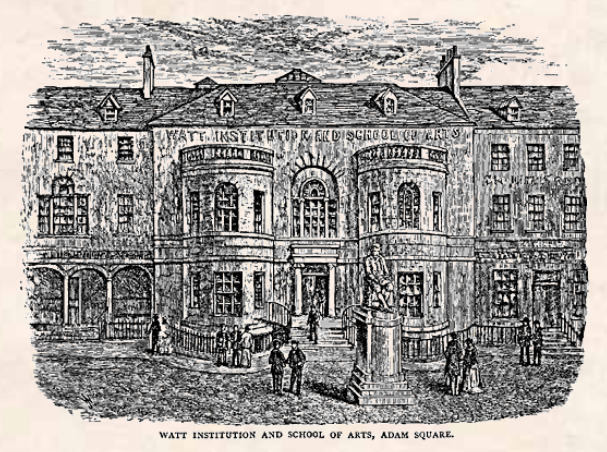
Adam Square in Edinburgh (Duncan's house on left)

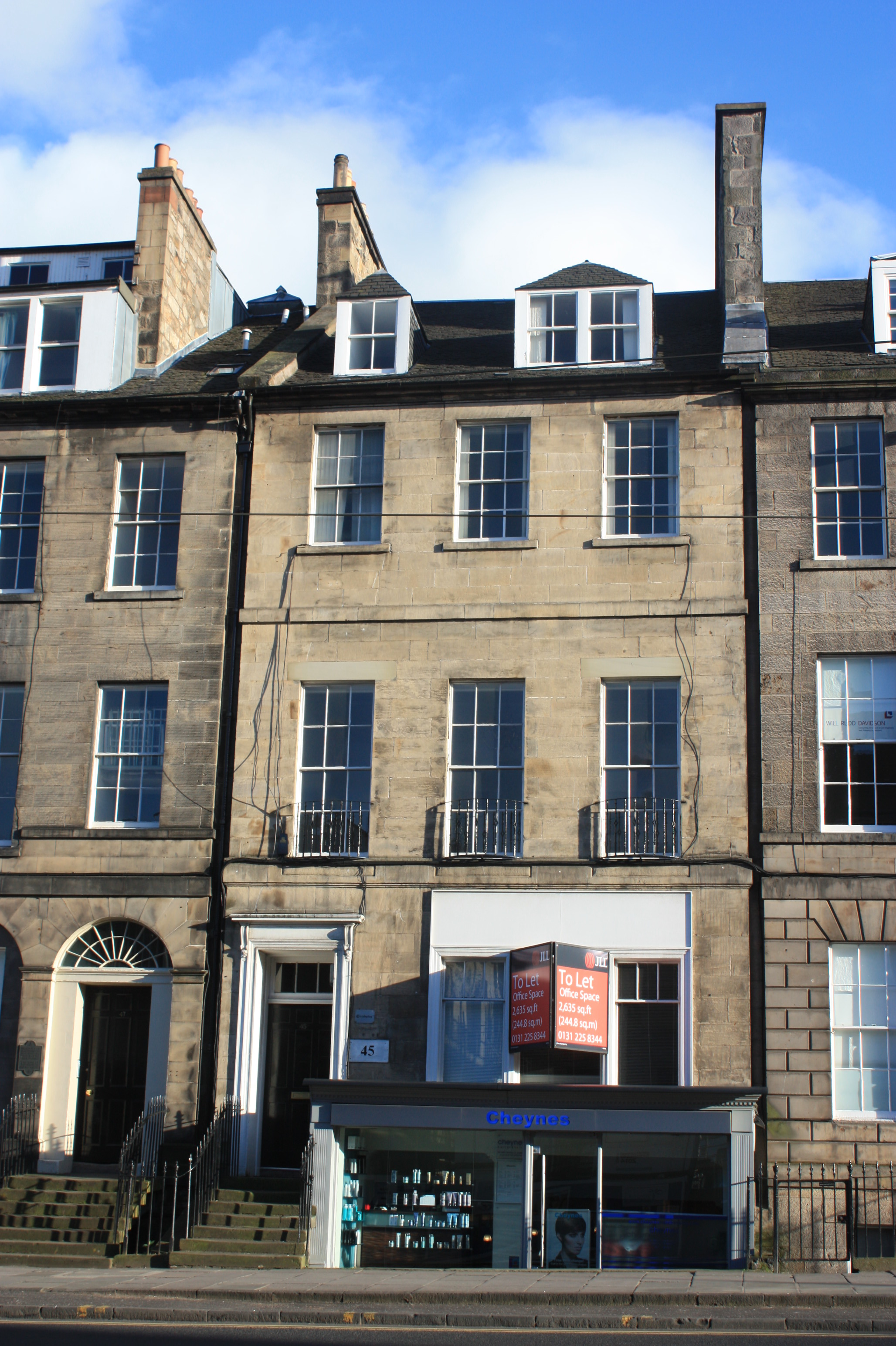
45 York Place, Edinburgh

Duncan was the son of Elizabeth Knox and Andrew Duncan, the elder, born at Adam Square in Edinburgh on 10 August 1773. His early education was at the High School in Edinburgh. He was then apprenticed (1787–92) to Alexander and George Wood, surgeons of Edinburgh. He graduated with an MA in 1793, and MD in 1794.

Duncan studied in London in 1794–5 at the Windmill Street School, under Matthew Baillie, William Cumberland Cruikshank, and James Wilson. He then made two long visits to the continent, studying medical practice in Göttingen, Vienna, Pisa, and Naples, and meeting Johann Friedrich Blumenbach, Johann Peter Frank, Antonio Scarpa, and Lazzaro Spallanzani. Returning to Edinburgh, he became a fellow of the College of Physicians of Edinburgh, and physician to the Royal Public Dispensary, assisting his father also in editing the Annals of Medicine. He later became physician to the Fever Hospital at Queensberry House.

In 1799 Duncan was elected a member of the Harveian Society of Edinburgh and in 1811 served as President. In 1805 he was elected a member of the Aesculapian Club. In 1807, a professorship of medical jurisprudence and medical police was created at Edinburgh, with Duncan as first professor, with an endowment of £100 per annum; but attendance at lectures in this subject was not made compulsory.

From 1809 to 1822, he acted as secretary of the university's academic senate and librarian; while from 1816 until his death he was an active member of the college commission for rebuilding the university, including the Adam-Playfair buildings. In 1819 he resigned his professorship of medical jurisprudence on being appointed joint professor with his father of the institutes of medicine. In 1821 he was elected without opposition professor of materia medica.

In 1827, Duncan had a severe attack of fever, and his strength afterwards gradually declined. He lectured until nearly the end of the session 1831–2, and died at his home at 45 York Place on 13 May 1832, aged 58.

He is buried in St Johns Churchyard on Princes Street.

== Works ==
Duncan in 1803 published the Edinburgh New Dispensatory, an improved version of William Lewis's work. This became very popular, a 10th edition appearing in 1822. It was translated into German and French, and was several times republished in the United States. He published a supplement to it in 1829. From 1805, he was for many years chief editor of the Edinburgh Medical and Surgical Journal, which gained a leading position in the field.

In 1809, he contributed to the Transactions of the Highland Society a "Treatise on the Diseases which are incident to Sheep in Scotland". He also published in 1818 Reports of the Practice in the Clinical Wards of the Royal Infirmary of Edinburgh. Perhaps his most distinctive discovery was the isolation of the principle cinchonin from cinchona, as related in Nicholson's Journal, 2nd ser. volume vi. December 1803. Besides writing copiously in his own Journal, he also wrote occasionally for the Edinburgh Review.

- The Edinburgh new Dispensatory : containing 1. The Elements of pharmaceutical Chemistry; 2. The Materia Medica; or the natural, pharmaceutical and medical History, or the Substances employed in Medicine; 3. The pharmaceutical Preparations and Compositions; including Translations of the Edinburgh Pharmacopoeia published in 1805, of the Dublin Pharmacopoeia in 1807, and of the London Pharmacopoeia in 1815. 8th Ed. Edinburgh : Bell & Bradfute, 1816. Digital Edition by the University and State Library Düsseldorf
- On the Diseases of Sheep

== Trained by Duncan ==
- James Scarth Combe, surgeon and later president of the Royal College of Surgeons of Edinburgh

== Family ==
He was married to Mary Macfarquhar. Their daughter Margaret Duncan married William Scott of Teviot Bank.
