= Sam Dickinson =

Sam or Samuel Dickinson may refer to:

- Sir Ben Dickinson (Samuel Benson Dickinson, 1912–2000), Australian geologist, director of mines in South Australia
- Sam Dickinson (rugby union) (born 1985), English rugby union player
- Sam Dickinson (triathlete) (born 1997), English triathlete
- Sam Dickinson (ice hockey) (born 2006), Canadian ice hockey player

== See also ==
- Samuel Dickenson (1733-1823), English clergyman and botanist
