= Jake Scott (disambiguation) =

Jake Scott (1945–2020) was an American football safety.

Jake Scott may also refer to:

- Jake Scott (cricketer) (born 2005), Australian cricketer
- Jake Scott (director) (born 1965), British film director
- Jake Scott (guard) (born 1981), former American football guard

== See also ==
- Scott (surname)
- Scott (disambiguation)
