= 1623 in philosophy =

1623 in philosophy

== Events ==
- Galileo Galilei lays down the foundations of the scientific method.

Philosophy is written in this grand book, the universe, which stands continually open to our gaze. But the book cannot be understood unless one first learns to comprehend the language and read the letters in which it is composed. It is written in the language of mathematics and its characters are triangles and circles, and other geometric figures without which it is humanly impossible to understand a single word of it; without these, one wanders about in a dark labyrinth.

— Galileo

== Publications ==
- Francis Bacon, De Augmentis Scientiarum (1623)
- William Drummond, A Cypresse Grove (1623)
- Galileo Galilei, The Assayer (Il Saggiatore) (1623)
- Patrick Scot, The Tillage of Light (1623)

== Births ==
- May 26 - William Petty (died 1687)
- June 19 - Blaise Pascal (died 1662)

== Deaths ==
- 16 November - Francisco Sanches (born 1550)

== Bibliography ==
- Arnǎutu, Robert R. A., Early Modern Philosophy of Technology: Bacon and Descartes, Zeta Books, 2017 ISBN 6066970364.
- Debus, Allen G., The Chemical Philosophy, Courier Corporation, 2013 ISBN 0486150216.
- Drake, Stillman, Essays on Galileo and the History and Philosophy of Science, University of Toronto Press, 1999 ISBN 0802075851.
- Galileo Galilei, (trans: Stillman Drake), The Assayer, 1623
- Grun, Bernard (1991). The timetables of history (3rd revised ed.). Simon & Schuster. p. 280. ISBN 0-671-74919-6.
- McClellan, James Edward; Dorn, Harold, Science and Technology in World History, Johns Hopkins University Press, 2006 ISBN 0801883598.
- Stein, Werner [in German] (1977). Kulturfahrplan : die wichtigsten Daten der Kultur- und Weltgeschichte von Anbeginn bis heute [Cultural Timeline : Key Dates in Cultural and World History from the Beginning to the Present Day] (in German). Vol. 3 : Frühneuzeit bis zum Wiener Kongress [From the early modern period to the Congress of Vienna]. Fischer Taschenbuch Verlag. p. 776. ISBN 3-596-26383-2.
