= Harry Scott =

Harry Scott may refer to:

- Harry Scott (ice hockey) (1885–1954), ice hockey player
- Harry Scott (boxer) (1937–2015), British boxer
- Harry Scott (rugby union), English rugby union player
- Harry J. Scott (1901–1978), founding editor of the Dalesman magazine
- Tup Scott (1858–1910), Australian cricket captain
- Harry Scott (footballer, born 1897) (1897–1970), English footballer for Sunderland
- Harry Scott (footballer born 1908) (died 1989), English footballer with Bournemouth and Swindon Town, see Jack Scott
- Harry Albert Scott, Canadian ambassador for Cuba preceding Hector Allard
- Harry Scott (1879–1947), one half of the comedy minstrel duo Scott and Whaley

== See also ==
- Henry Scott (disambiguation)
- Harold Scott (disambiguation)
