= Gary Scott =

Gary or Garry Scott may refer to:

- Gary Scott (footballer) (born 1978), English footballer
- Gary Scott (baseball) (born 1968), baseball player
- Gary Scott (cricketer) (born 1984), English cricketer
- Gary Scott (racing driver), Australian touring car racing driver, 3rd place in the 1986 James Hardie 1000
- Gary S. Scott, American film composer
- Garry Scott (born 1954), Australian rules footballer

== See also ==
- Gary Scott Thompson, screenwriter and producer
- Gary Scott AA Provincial Championships, Canadian Football high school football championships
