= Kenneth Scott =

Kenneth, Ken, or Kenn Scott may refer to:

== Entertainment industry members ==
- Ken Scott (actor) (1928–1986), American film and television performer
- Kenneth Kamal Scott (1940–2015), American singer, dancer and actor
- Ken Scott (record producer) (born 1947), English recording engineer for the Beatles
- Ken Scott (filmmaker) (born 1970), Canadian screenwriter, actor, director and comedian
- Kenn Scott (screenwriter), Canadian producer and academic since 1997
- Kenn Scott (actor) (born 1967), American puppeteer, filmmaker and martial artist

== Public officials ==
- Kenneth E. Scott (politician) (1928–2025), American legislator in Minnesota House of Representatives
- Kenneth D. Scott (born 1930), American politician from Iowa
- Kenneth Scott (courtier) (1931–2018), British Deputy Private Secretary to Queen Elizabeth II

== Sportsmen ==
- Kenneth Scott (cricketer) (1915–1943), English righthanded batsman
- Ken Scott (Australian footballer) (1926–2012), with Footscray in VFL
- Ken Scott (English footballer) (born 1931), winger for Derby County and Mansfield Town
- Kenneth Scott (swimmer) (1937–1990), English competitor at British Empire Games

== Others ==
- Kenneth E. Scott (lawyer) (1928–2016), American legal scholar
