= Richard Scott =

Richard or Rick Scott may refer to:

- Richard Scott (artist) (born 1968), South African artist
- Richard Scott (cricketer) (born 1963), English cricketer and cricket coach
- Richard Scott (doctor) (1914–1983), Scottish professor of general practice
- Richard Scott (footballer) (born 1974), English footballer
- Richard Scott (golfer) (born 1983), Canadian professional golfer
- Richard Scott (ice hockey) (born 1978), Canadian ice hockey player
- Richard Scott (settler) (1605–1679), early settler of Providence, Rhode Island
- Richard Scott, 10th Duke of Buccleuch (born 1954), British peer and landowner
- Richard Scott, Baron Scott of Foscote (born 1934), British life peer and Lord in Appeal of Ordinary
- Richard A. Scott (born 1964), comic book artist, writer, videographer and voice actor
- Richard Farquhar Scott (1914–2011), Chairman of the Scott Trust, owner of The Guardian British newspaper
- Richard G. Scott (1928–2015), nuclear engineer and member of the Quorum of the Twelve Apostles of the Church of Jesus Christ of Latter-day Saints
- Richard Gilbert Scott (1923–2017), British architect
- Richard H. Scott (1858–1917), Justice of the Wyoming Supreme Court
- Richard J. Scott (1938–2024), Canadian jurist
- Richard M. Scott (1918–2005), American politician, mayor of Lancaster, Pennsylvania
- Richard T. Scott (born 1980), American figurative painter
- Richard William Scott (1825–1913), Canadian politician and cabinet minister
- Rick Scott (born 1952), U.S. Senator from Florida

== See also ==
- Dick Scott (disambiguation)
- William Richard Scott (born 1932), American sociologist
