= Patricia Scott =

Patricia Scott may refer to:

== Politics and government ==
- Patricia Scott (politician) (died 2001), member of the Washington House of Representatives
- Pat Schroeder (née Scott, 1940–2023), U.S. representative from Colorado
- Patricia Scott (public servant), Australian government official

== Others ==
- Patricia Scrymgeour-Wedderburn, Countess of Dundee (née Montagu Douglas Scott, 1910–2012), Scottish countess
- Patricia Scott (author) (1926–2012), Australian author and storyteller
- Pat Scott (1929–2016), American baseball pitcher

== See also ==
- Patrecia Scott (1940–1977), Canadian-American actress and model
- Patrick Scott (disambiguation)
