= Scott Point =

Scott Point, Scott Pt., Pt. Scott, Point Scott, may refer to:

== New Zealand ==
- Tiriparepa / Scott Point, Ninety Mile Beach, Northland region, North Island, New Zealand; a headland
- Scott Point, Endeavour Inlet, Queen Charlotte Sound, Marlborough Sounds, South Island, New Zealand; a headland
- Scott Point, Mahurangi Peninsula, Rodney Local Board Area, Rodney Ward, Auckland region, North Island, New Zealand; a headland
- Scott Point, Scotts Landing, Auckland region, North Island, New Zealand
- Scott Point School, Hobsonville, West Auckland, Auckland region, North Island, New Zealand; a primary school, see List of schools in the Auckland region

== Other ==
- Scott Point, Scott Bay, Fowlers Bay, South Australia, Australia; a headland named for colonist Edward Bate Scott
- Point Scott, Lake Victoria, Australia; a cuspate foreland
- Scott Point, Salt Spring Island, Gulf Islands, Strait of Georgia, British Columbia, Canada; the location of a Royal Vancouver Yacht Club station
- Scott Point, Palawan, Luzon, Philippines; see List of headlands of the Philippines
- Scott Point, Catawba Island Township, Ottawa County, Ohio, USA; a peninsula in Lake Erie near South Bass Island
- Scott Point site (20MK22), Scott Point, Mackinac County, Michigan, USA; a NRHP-listed archaeological site on the shore of Lake Michigan

== See also ==
- Point (disambiguation)
- Scott (disambiguation)
