= Bruce Scott =

Bruce Scott may refer to:

- Bruce Scott (Australian politician) (born 1943), member of the Australian House of Representatives
- Bruce J. Scott (born 1933), American politician in Florida
- Bruce Scott (boxer) (born 1969), Jamaican/British boxer
