= Ray Scott =

Ray Scott may refer to:

== Sports ==
- Ray Scott (angler) (1933–2022), American outdoorsman and founder of B.A.S.S.
- Ray Scott (sportscaster) (1919–1998), American sportscaster
- Ray Scott (basketball) (born 1938), American basketball player and coach
- Ray Scott (Australian rules football) (1927–2003), Australian rules football player and umpire

== Other people ==
- Raymond Scott (1908–1994), American composer and bandleader
- Ray Scott (singer) (born 1975), American country music singer
- Ray Scott (politician), Colorado state senator

== See also ==
- Scott (name)
