= Freddie Scott (British Army officer) =

Major Frederic Balfour Scott MC (31 January 1922 – 15 April 2011) was a British Army officer who was awarded a Military Cross for gallantry whilst serving with the 2nd Battalion, The Oxfordshire and Buckinghamshire Light Infantry (the 52nd) in Normandy during the Second World War.

== Early life ==
Frederic Balfour Scott was born at Monifieth, Angus and educated at Fettes College, Edinburgh.

In 1940 he enlisted in the Army as a private in The Duke of Wellington's Regiment and was later commissioned into the Oxfordshire and Buckinghamshire Light Infantry and was posted to the 2nd Ox and Bucks (the 52nd).

== Normandy 1944 ==
Scott was a platoon commander on D-Day, 6 June 1944 and landed at Ranville at approximately 21.00hrs. He took part in the advance on Hérouvillette and Escoville and was with 2nd Ox and Bucks on Breville ridge until August.

On 25 August 1944 the 2nd Ox and Bucks were tasked to capture Manneville-la-Raoult which was heavily defended by a German Garrison. Scott's platoon came under attack by machine gun fire and grenades. An extract from the citation for his Military Cross reads: "During the action this officer's example, leadership and determination were largely responsible for the success of the action and were an inspiration to the men under him." – Lieutenant Frederick Balfour Scott

Unit : No.21 Platoon, "C" Company, 2nd Oxfordshire and Buckinghamshire Light Infantry

Service No. : 229829

Awards : Military Cross

Lieutenant Scott commanded a platoon throughout the campaign in Normandy. He has taken out many patrols into enemy lines and his skill, personal courage and powers of leadership have been a source of constant inspiration to his men. In particular on 25 August 1944 Lieutenant Scott's platoon was to infiltrate towards a known enemy position. When his leading section came under Machine-Gun fire and grenades from an enemy post Lieutenant Scott immediately went forward firing his sten inflicting casualties on the enemy and drove them out. During the action this officer's example, leadership and determination were largely responsible for the success of the action and were an inspiration to the men under him.

== North-West Europe 1944–45 ==
He served with the 2nd Ox and Bucks in the Ardennes and the Netherlands from December 1944 to February 1945. Scott took part in Operation Varsity: the air assault landing over the Rhine on 24 March 1945 and in the advance across Germany to the Baltic Sea.

== Post war ==
Following the Second World War he served in Palestine and was then demobilised from the Army.

Scott later worked for British American Tobacco and was based in Penang, Malaya. After a period in South Africa he returned to England and managed a marketing research company and lived near Chichester. He later lived in Bognor Regis, Sussex.

He married Mildred Swettenham in 1947. He was widowed in 1979.

Major Freddie Scott MC died on 15 April 2011.
