= Dick Scott =

Dick Scott may refer to:

- Dick Scott (American football) (1924–2012), American college football player
- Dick Scott (right-handed pitcher) (1883–1911), American Major League Baseball pitcher
- Dick Scott (left-handed pitcher) (1933–2020), American Major League Baseball pitcher
- Dick Scott (shortstop) (born 1962), American former Major League Baseball shortstop
- Dick Scott (footballer) (1941–2018), English footballer
- Richard Scott (doctor) (1914–1983), Scottish professor of general practice
- Richard M. Scott (1918–2005), mayor of Lancaster, Pennsylvania
- Dick Scott (historian) (1923–2020), New Zealand writer
- William Richard Scott (born 1932), American sociologist

== See also ==
- Richard Scott (disambiguation)
