= Matthew Scott =

Matthew or Matt Scott may refer to:

== Sports ==
- Matthew Scott (footballer, born 1867) (1867–1897), English footballer for Sunderland
- Matthew Scott (footballer, born 1872) (1872–1941), Scottish footballer (Airdrieonians FC and Scotland)
- Matthew Scott (cricketer) (born 1979), English cricketer
- Matt Scott (basketball) (born 1985), American wheelchair basketball player
- Matthew Scott (rugby league) (born 1985), Australian rugby league footballer
- Matt Scott (rugby union) (born 1990), Scottish rugby union player
- Matt Scott (American football) (born 1990), American football quarterback
- Matt Scott (sports journalist) (fl. 2007–present), British sports journalist

== Others ==
- Matthew T. Scott (1828–1891), American agriculturist
- Matthew P. Scott (fl. 1980s–present), American development biologist
- Matt Scott (musician) (fl. 1995–1996), American musician with Chevelle
- Matthew Scott (Stargate) (2009–2011), fictional character in Stargate Universe
- Matthew Scott (police commissioner) (fl. 2016–present), English police commissioner
