= Mary Scott =

Mary Scott may refer to:

- Mary-anne Scott, New Zealand writer, singer, and musician
- Mary Scott, Countess of Deloraine (died 1744), royal mistress
- Mary Augusta Scott (1851–1918), American scholar
- Mary Elizabeth MacCallum Scott (c. 1865–1941), Canadian physician and Christian medical missionary
- Mary McKay Scott (1851–1932), Canadian temperance reformer, journalist, and writer
- Mary Monica Maxwell-Scott (1852–1920), Scottish author of historical novels and non-fiction
- Mary Montagu-Douglas-Scott, Duchess of Buccleuch (1900–1993), British duchess
- Mary Scott, 3rd Countess of Buccleuch (1647–1661), Scottish peeress
- Mary Scott (Australian artist) (born 1957), Australian artist
- Mary Scott (Canadian artist) (born 1948), Canadian artist
- Mary Scott (missionary) (1887–1964), Scottish missionary and educator
- Mary Scott (novelist) (1888–1979), New Zealand novelist, teacher, and librarian
- Mary Scott (poet) (1751/1752–1793), English poet
- Mary-Scott Welch (1919–1995), American writer and magazine editor
- Mary Wingfield Scott (1895–1983), American historic preservationist
- Mary White Scott (1897–1972), American teacher, farmer, and First Lady of North Carolina
