= Charles Darwin (medical student) =

Son of Erasmus Darwin (1758–1778)

- Born: 3 September 1758
- Died: 15 May 1778 (aged 19)
- Parents: Erasmus Darwin; Mary Howard
- Relatives: See Darwin–Wedgwood family

Charles Darwin (3 September 1758 – 15 May 1778) was the eldest son of Erasmus Darwin (1731‍–‍1802) and Mary Howard (1740‍–‍1770). He was the uncle of the famous naturalist Charles Darwin (1809‍–‍1882), though he died several years before his nephew was born. He showed considerable promise while studying medicine at the University of Edinburgh but died before completing his studies.

== Childhood and classical education ==
A memoir by his father recalled young Charles Darwin as having a precocious interest in science, from infancy being:

accustomed to examine all natural objects with more attention than is usual: first by his senses simply; then by tools, which were his playthings – By this early use of his hands, he gained accurate ideas of many of the qualities of bodies; and was thence afterwards enabled to acquire the knowledge of mechanics with ease and with accuracy; and the invention and improvement of machines was one of the first efforts of his ingenuity, and one of the first sources of his amusement.
He had frequent opportunities in his early years of observing the various fossile productions in their native beds; and descended the mines of Derbyshire, and of some other counties, with uncommon pleasure and observation. He collected with care the products of these countries; and examined them by such experiments, as he had been taught, or had discovered: hence he obtained not only distinct but indelible ideas of the properties of bodies, at the very time when he learnt the names of them; and thus the complicate science of chemistry became not only easy, but delightful to him.

Like his father, he had a stammer as a child. In an attempt to cure this by learning the French language, around the end of October 1766 the eight-year-old Charles Darwin was sent to Paris with a private tutor, the Reverend Samuel Dickenson. They travelled, and brought back many aromatic plants of Montpellier from Gouan. Darwin was only allowed to converse in French, and by their return in or possibly after March 1767 he was able to speak fluent French without a stammer, but the problem persisted when he spoke English. He went on to study at Lichfield School which had, in his father's view, an excessive emphasis on the Classics. His mother suffered from a long illness, and died on 30 July 1770. Erasmus showed deep distress, but was resilient and after about a year found another partner. Charles continued to show impressive abilities as he grew up. He made friends with some of his father's fellow members of the Lunar Society, including William Small and Matthew Boulton.

In September 1774 Darwin entered Christ Church, University of Oxford at the age of 16, and he matriculated there on 30 March 1775. He studied at Oxford for less than a year, as he disliked the curriculum as pursuing "classical elegance" and "sigh'd to be removed to the robuster exercises of the medical schools of Edinburgh."

== University of Edinburgh ==
Darwin arrived at the University of Edinburgh in the Autumn of 1775 or early in 1776, and was well settled in by April. At that time the university had a Europe wide reputation for its invigorating emphasis on experimental methods and intellectual stimulus. Soon after joining the university Darwin became friends with the up-and-coming clinical teacher Andrew Duncan, staying in his house and getting personal guidance as well as access to the wards of The Royal Infirmary of Edinburgh. He discussed his interests in letters to his father, commenting on new ideas and therapies in use. In April 1776 Erasmus wrote mentioning studies of the human pulse, and an unpublished manuscript What are the established varieties of the pulse, their causes & uses in medicine appears to have been one of Charles Darwin's earliest works, showing his abilities in observations of variations due to age or exercise, and a good grasp of the current literature on blood circulation. He submitted a dissertation on the distinction between mucus and pus for the first annual gold medal of the Aesculapian Society at Edinburgh, and won this medal in March 1778. His graduating dissertation, written as a conventional thesis in classical Latin, discussed the relationship between the lymphoid system and "dropsy", heart failure. As well as following the teachings on this subject in Edinburgh at that time, it showed his independent ideas and evidence from well considered experiments.

== Illness and death ==
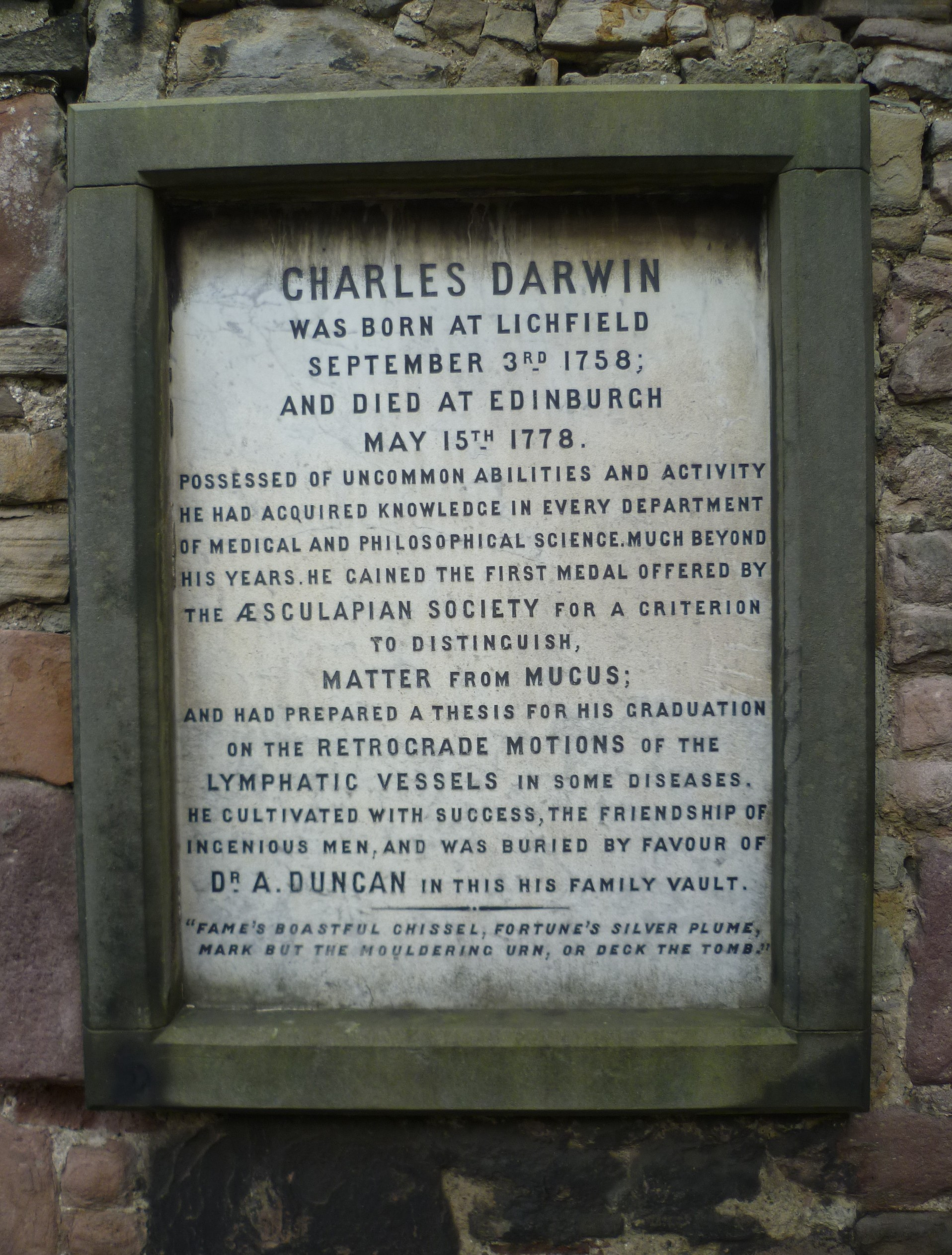
Memorial tablet above Darwin's grave, Buccleuch Church, Edinburgh

He died on 15 May 1778, apparently from a cut sustained while performing an autopsy.

About the end of April, Mr. Darwin had employed the greatest part of a day in accurately dissecting the brain of a child which had died of hydrocephalus, and which he had attended during its life. That very evening he was seized with severe head-ach. This, however, did not prevent him from being present in the Medical Society, where he mentioned to Dr. Duncan the dissection he had made, and promised the next day to furnish him with an account of all the circumstances in writing. But the next day, to his headach there supervened other febrile symptoms. And, in a short time, from the hemorrhagies, petechial eruption, and foetid loose stools which occurred, his disease manifested a very putrescent tendency.

The clinical picture described here, particularly the petechial haemorrhages, strongly supports a diagnosis of meningococcal disease.

Charles Darwin was buried in the family vault of his professor and mentor, Andrew Duncan MD, in the Burying Ground of the Parish Church of St Cuthbert's chapel of ease (later renamed Buccleuch Parish Church), sited on the south side of Edinburgh at 33 Chapel Street, not far from the Old College of the University of Edinburgh.

== Publication of work ==
Erasmus translated his son's graduating dissertation from Latin into English, and had it together with the gold medal winning dissertation published in Lichfield in book form in 1780 as Experiments establishing a criterion between mucaginous and purulent matter. And an account of the retrograde motion from the absorbent vessels of animal bodies in some diseases. The author's name was shown as Charles Darwin, and Erasmus wrote a short memoir as an appendix, including the description of his son's childhood shown above. It also includes the only description Erasmus published of the boy's mother, Mary Howard, praising her for having brought their son up to have "sympathy with the pains and pleasures of others", and "as she had wisely sown no seeds of superstition in his mind, there was nothing to overshade the virtues she had implanted."

Pages 103–112 describe the use of "decoction of foxglove" (digitalis) to treat "dropsy" (heart failure), under the heading "A note belonging to page 65, and 68", and the words "The fox-glove has been given to dropsical patients in this country with considerable success: the following cases are related with design to ascertain the particular kinds of dropsy, in which this drug is preferable to squill, or other evacuants." The case notes given on these pages are the first published account of the treatment, predating the description published in 1785 by its discoverer William Withering in An account of the foxglove and some of its medical uses.

The book of Darwin's dissertations does not mention Withering, but the first case described in its appendix is a "Miss Hill of Aston near Newport" who is given a more detailed description as case IV in Withering's book. Erasmus Darwin noted the date in his Commonplace book as 25 July 1776, and it appears that he learnt of the use of digitalis when both he and Withering saw this patient in consultation. Withering's description suggests he is annoyed at Darwin's incomplete account, and Page 8 of his book says that "Dr. Duncan also tells me that the late very ingenious and accomplished Mr. Charles Darwin, informed him of its being used by his father and myself, in cases of Hydrothorax, and that he has ever since mentioned it in his lectures, and sometimes employed it in his practice." Though there is no indication as to the author of the case descriptions, implying that they were part of Charles Darwin's dissertation, in later publications Erasmus Darwin said he had appended case notes, and it seems clear that these were his own. In a paper, dated 14 January 1785 and read on 16 March of that year, Erasmus Darwin published a more detailed "account of the successful use of foxglove", but this gained little attention. Withering's "account" has a preface dated 1 July 1885, and its publication later that year convinced physicians of the use of digitalis as treatment. While Darwin had priority of publication, Withering is rightly given credit for finding and developing this treatment, and was understandably annoyed at Erasmus Darwin. The book of dissertations also had a note of "other ingenious works of the late Mr Darwin in the Hands of the Editor, which may at some distant time be given to the public". The only one discovered was Charles Darwin's unpublished manuscript on the pulse, which was found in the Medical Society of London.

== Relatives ==
Charles Darwin's younger brother Erasmus Darwin II became a rich solicitor, but in 1799 drowned himself in the River Derwent. The youngest of Erasmus Darwin's three sons, Robert Waring Darwin, followed his father and eldest brother into medicine, becoming a successful physician. He married Susannah Wedgwood, and in the family tradition they named their first boy after his grandfather and uncle, Erasmus Alvey Darwin who was known to the family as Eras. When their second boy was born they named him after his uncle and father, both medical men, Charles Robert Darwin. While he was a child they called him "Bobby", but he became known simply as Charles Darwin, eclipsing the memory of the short life of his uncle of that name.

In October 1825 the brothers Eras and Charles went to Edinburgh University, and in January they visited "the old Dr. Duncan", Charles wrote home "What an extraordinary old man he is, now being past 80, & continuing to lecture", though Dr. Hawley, who had shown them round the city, thought Duncan was now failing. In an 1879 biographical sketch of his grandfather Erasmus Darwin, he outlined his uncle's life, and said that "Professor Andrew Duncan, in whose family vault Charles was buried, cut a lock of hair from the corpse, and took it to a jeweller, whose apprentice, afterwards the famous Sir H. Raeburn, set it in a locket for a memorial. The venerable professor spoke to me about him with the warmest affection forty-seven years after his death, when I was a young medical student in Edinburgh."
