= Scott Free =

Scott Free may refer to:

- Scott Free (album), a 1984 album by Max Roach
- Scott Free (comics) or Mister Miracle, a DC Comics character
- Scott Free Productions, a film production company

== See also ==
- Scot and lot
- Free (disambiguation)
- Scott (disambiguation)
