= Barry Scott =

Barry Scott may refer to:

- Barry Scott (actor) (1955–2020), American actor and voice-over artist
- Barry Scott (cricketer) (1916–1984), Australian cricketer
- Barry Scott (Cillit Bang), an advertising character
- Barry Scott (geneticist), Fellow of the Royal Society Te Apārangi
- Barry Scott, lead vocalist of Barry Scott & Second Wind
- Barry Scott, American DJ and host of The Lost 45s
