= Scot (given name) =

Scot is a masculine given name. Notable people with the name include:

- Scot Brantley (born 1958), American football linebacker
- Scot Breithaupt (born 1957), American cyclist
- Scot Coogan (born 1971), American rock drummer
- Scot D. Ryersson (born 1960), American writer
- Scot Dapp (born 1952), American football coach
- Scot Davis (21st century), American wrestler
- Scot Eaton (21st century), American comic book artist
- Scot Gemmill (born 1971), Scottish professional football player
- Scot Halpin (1954–2008), American drummer
- Scot Heckert, member of the West Virginia House of Delegates
- Scot Hollonbeck (21st century), American wheelchair racer
- Scot Kelsh (born 1962), American politician
- Scot Kleinendorst (1960–2019), American ice hockey defenseman
- Scot McCloughan (21st century), American football executive
- Scot McKnight (21st century), American theologian
- Scot Mendelson (born 1969), American powerlifter
- Scot Palmer (21st century), Australian sports journalist
- Scot Pollard (born 1975), American professional basketball player
- Scot Rubin (21st century), American television talk show host
- Scot Schmidt (born 1961), American alpine skier
- Scot Shields (born 1975), American baseball player
- Scot Sloan, a Doonesbury character
- Scot Symon (1911–1985), Scottish football player
- Scot Thompson (born 1981), American soccer player
- Scot Walters (21st century), American racecar driver
- Scot Williams (born 1972), English actor
- Wayne Scot Lukas (21st century), American fashion consultant

== See also ==
- Scott (name)
- Scut (disambiguation)
