= Patrick Scott =

Patrick Scott may refer to:

- Patrick Scot (fl. 1620), Scottish author and royal tutor
- Patrick J. Scott (1848–1899), Canadian lawyer and politician
- Pat Scott (British Army officer) (1905–1976), British Army general
- Patrick Scott (artist) (1921–2014), Irish artist
- Patrick Scott (American football) (born 1964), American football player

== See also ==
- Patricia Scott (disambiguation)
