= Scot (surname) =

Scot is a surname. Notable people with the surname include:

- Daniel Scot (21st century), co-director of Ibrahim Ministries International
- Lewis Scot (17th century), English pirate
- Michael Scot (c. 1175 – 1232), Scottish astrologer
- Reginald Scot (c. 1538 – 1599), English author
- Robert Scot (1744–1823), American artist
- Thomas Scot (died 1660), English Member of Parliament
- William Scot (13th century), Roman Catholic priest

== See also ==
- Scott (name)
