= Mary Scott (Australian artist) =

Australian artist

Mary Scott (born New Norfolk, Tasmania 1957) is one of the Hobart, Tasmania-based artists, with works in the permanent collections of National Gallery of Victoria, Melbourne; Artbank, Sydney; Tasmanian Museum and Art Gallery and the University of Tasmania Fine Arts Collection, Hobart. She is Senior Lecturer and Head of Drawing at the University of Tasmania.

Scott studied at the Canberra School of Art. She won the City of Hobart Art Prize for drawing in 2009.
