= Kenneth E. Scott (lawyer) =

American lawyer

Kenneth E. Scott (1928–2016) was an American lawyer, having been the Ralph M. Parsons Professor Emeritus of Law and Business at Stanford Law School.
