= Romano Scott =

South African soccer player

Personal information
- Full name: Romano Scott
- Date of birth: 4 January 1985 (age 41)
- Place of birth: Cape Town, South Africa
- Height: 1.70 m (5 ft 7 in)
- Positions: Striker; midfielder

Team information
- Current team: Engen Santos
- Number: 11

Youth career
- 1994-1999: Westridge FC
- 1999-2000: Seven Stars
- 2000-2004: Ajax Cape Town
- 2004-2005: Winchendon, USA [Scholarship]

Senior career*
Years	Team	Apps	(Gls)
2005-2012	Engen Santos	200	(20)
2012-2013	Bay Stars	24	(8)

International career^{‡}
1997-2007	u12, u14, u17, u20, u23	12	(6)
- * Club domestic league appearances and goals as of 14 June 2025 ‡ National team caps and goals as of 14 June 2025

Romano Scott (born 4 January 1985 in Cape Town, Western Cape) was a South African football (soccer) midfielder and striker for Premier Soccer League club Engen Santos.

He hails from Mitchell's Plain on the Cape Flats. He is married to Jill Scott and father to Emma Scott.

His older brother Carlo Scott was also a soccer player.

Romano is retired. A combination of misfortune, injury troubles and longing for quality family time led to his premature retirement at 28. As of 2021, he is currently residing in Century City, Carlo Scott’s younger brother says he couldn’t be happier with life after football, states on Interview with Romano by the Press Reader.
