= Ben Scott =

Ben Scott may refer to:

- Ben Scott (cricketer) (born 1981)
- Ben Scott (policy advisor) (born 1977)
- Ben Scott (politician) (born 1942)
