= USS Scott =

USS Scott refers to several ships of the U.S. Navy:

- USS Keith (DE-241) was originally named USS Scott
- USS Scott (DE-214), a Buckley-class destroyer escort, named for Robert R. Scott.
- USS Scott (DDG-995), a Kidd-class destroyer named for Rear Admiral Norman Scott.

== See also ==
- USS Norman Scott (DD-690)
