= Clive Scott =

Clive Scott is the name of:

- Clive Scott (musician) (1945–2009), member of British band Jigsaw
- Clive Scott (linguist) (fl. from 1994), professor of European Literature and author of books on French poetry
- Clive Scott (actor) (Robert Clive Cleghorn, 1937–2021), South African actor and director
