= Harold Scott =

Harold Scott may refer to:

- Harold Scott (police commissioner) (1887–1969), commissioner of the London Metropolitan Police from 1945 to 1953
- Harold Scott (actor) (1891–1964), British actor
- Harold Scott (politician) (1894–1961), Canadian politician in Ontario
- Harold Scott (cricketer) (1907–1997), English cricketer
- Harold Scott (director) (1935–2006), American stage director and actor
- Harold Seymore Scott (1883–1945), architect
- Harold "Scotty" Scott, American vocalist with The Temprees

== See also ==
- Harry Scott (disambiguation)
