= Henry Scott (English cricketer) =

English cricketer (1851–1941)

Henry Scott (28 October 1851 – 11 November 1941) was an English cricketer who played first-class cricket for Somerset in 1882. He was born and died at Sutton-in-Ashfield, Nottinghamshire.

A lower-order right-handed batsman and a right-arm off-spin bowler, Scott played for Somerset in non-first-class matches from 1879, but appeared in only two first-class games when the county club gained first-class status in 1882. He took two Lancashire wickets for 49 runs in 45 (four-ball) overs in Somerset's first-ever first-class match, but those were the only wickets of his first-class career.
