= Tyler Scott =

Tyler Scott may refer to:

- Tyler Scott (Canadian football) (born 1985), Canadian football wide receiver
- Tyler Scott (American football) (born 2001), American football wide receiver

== See also ==
- Tyler Rogers (Tyler Scott Rogers; born 1990), American professional baseball pitcher
