= Ronald Scott =

Ronald Scott may refer to:

- Bon Scott (Ronald Belford Scott, 1946–1980), Scottish-Australian singer and songwriter
- Ron Scott (sports administrator) (1928–2016), New Zealand sports administrator
- Ronald B. Scott (1945–2020), American author, journalist and pundit
- Sir Ronald Bodley Scott (1906–1982), English haematologist
- Ron Scott (born 1960), Canadian ice hockey player
- Ron E. Scott (born 1967), Canadian film director
- Ron Scott (journalist) (1947–2018), Scottish sportswriter
- Ronald Scott (aviator) (1917–2025), Argentine naval aviator
- Ronald F. Scott (1929–2005), British-born American geotechnical engineer
- Ronald Scott (American football) (born 1963), American football player
