= Samuel Dickenson =

British botanist (1733–1823)

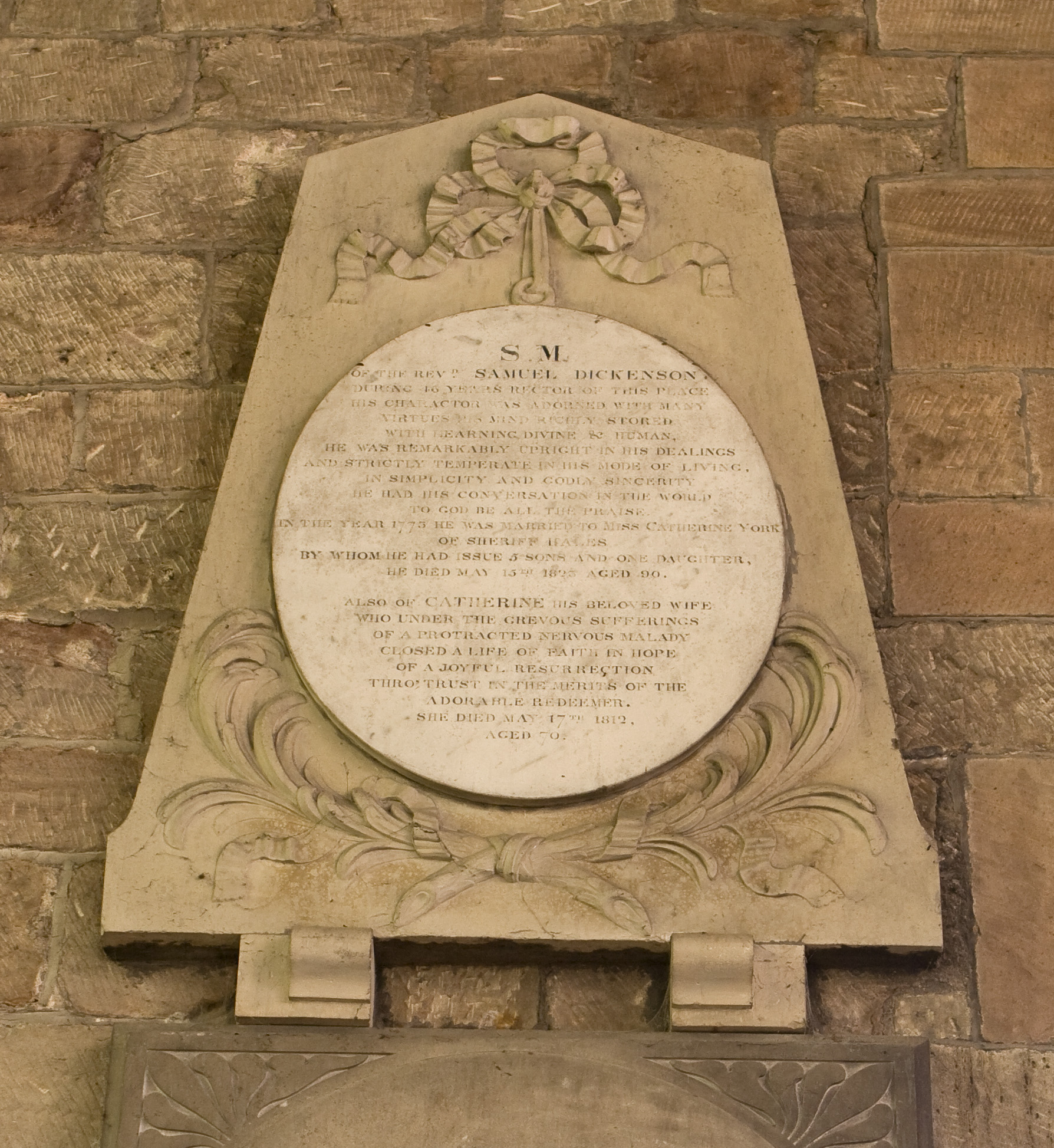
Memorial to Samuel Dickenson in St. Mary's Church, Blymhill.

Samuel Dickenson (1733 – 15 May 1823) was an English clergyman and botanist.

== Life ==
Samuel Dickenson was born in 1733. He was educated at St John's College, Cambridge, where he was a contemporary of Erasmus Darwin.

He succeeded his father John Dickenson as Rector of St. Mary's, Blymhill and remained in the position from 9 January 1777 until his death, aged 90, in 1823.

The inscription on his memorial in St. Mary's reads:

Revd. Samuel Dickenson during 46 years Rector of this place his character was adorned with many virtues, his mind richly stored with learning divine and humane, he was remarkably upright in his dealings & strictly temperate in his mode of living, in simplicity & godly sincerity. He had his conversation in the world. rest in peace Samuel dickenson

== Writings ==
Dickenson contributed to various botanical and historical works and was tutor to Thomas Beddoes and Charles Darwin (uncle of the famous naturalist Charles Robert Darwin). He accompanied the 8-year old Darwin on an excursion to France, collecting plants, between October 1766 and March 1767.
