= Bruce J. Scott =

American former politician

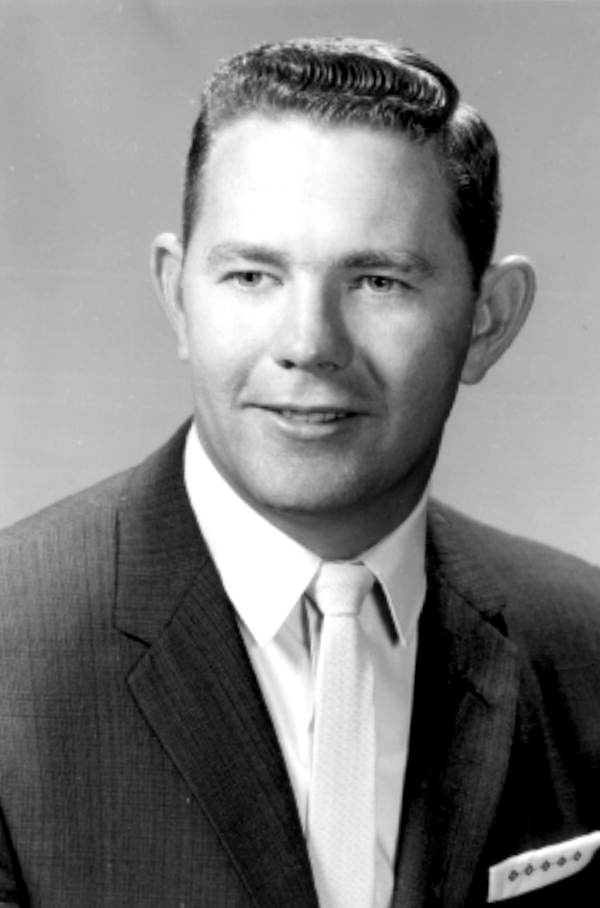

Member of the Florida House of Representatives for Lee County
- In office 1961–1963

Personal details
- Born: Bruce Jerry Scott; April 7, 1933 Marco Island, Florida, U.S.
- Died: April 19, 2025 (aged 92)
- Party: Democratic
- Spouse: Velma H. Geary
- Children: 2
- Occupation: real estate developer and broker

Bruce Jerry Scott (April 7, 1933 - April 19, 2025) was an American former politician in the state of Florida.

Scott was born in Marco Island, Florida and lived in North Fort Myers, Florida. He was a realtor and developer. He served in the Florida House of Representatives from 1961 to 1963, as a Democrat, representing Lee County.
