= Barry Scott (cricketer) =

Australian cricketer (1916–1984)

Personal information
- Full name: Robert Barrington Scott
- Born: 9 October 1916; Melbourne, Australia
- Died: 6 April 1984 (aged 67); Melbourne, Australia
- Batting: Left-handed
- Bowling: Right-arm fast

Domestic team information
- Years: Team
- 1935–36 to 1939–40: Victoria
- 1940–41: New South Wales

Career statistics
| Competition | First-class |
|---|---|
| Matches | 22 |
| Runs scored | 318 |
| Batting average | 13.82 |
| 100s/50s | 0/0 |
| Top score | 49 |
| Balls bowled | 4374 |
| Wickets | 59 |
| Bowling average | 36.22 |
| 5 wickets in innings | 3 |
| 10 wickets in match | 1 |
| Best bowling | 7/33 |
| Catches/stumpings | 9/– |
- Source: Cricinfo, 30 October 2019

Robert Barrington "Barry" Scott (9 October 1916 – 6 April 1984) was an Australian cricketer. He played first-class cricket for Victoria between 1935 and 1940 and for New South Wales in 1940–41.

== Cricket career ==
A tall, powerfully built right-arm fast bowler and hard-hitting left-handed lower-order batsman, Scott's best season was 1938–39, when he took 23 wickets at an average of 22.39, including figures of 7 for 33 and 5 for 46 when Victoria beat New South Wales in a Sheffield Shield match in Sydney. At the end of the 1939–40 season he was selected to open the bowling for The Rest against New South Wales. He was considered one of Australia's most promising young fast bowlers immediately before World War II.

Scott had a vigorous run-up and a peculiar bowling action. The Cricketer's Australian correspondent noted in early 1939: "He has a whirlwind arm action; just before delivery his left elbow points skyward while the right hand begins its sweep from the region of the left armpit, the general effect being heightened by a lock of black hair which flops, Hitler fashion, across his brow."

== Life outside cricket ==
Scott was educated at Wesley College and at Melbourne University, where he studied Arts and Law. He married Yvonne Evans in Melbourne in May 1940.

He served in the Army in World War II as a private. After the war he became a prominent advertising executive in Melbourne. In the early 1950s he was an assistant trade commissioner in New York.
