= Christian Scott =

Christian Scott may refer to:

- Christian Scott (baseball) (born 1999), American baseball player
- Christian Scott (musician) (born 1983), American musician, now known as Chief Xian aTunde Adjuah
