= Royal Public Dispensary of Edinburgh =

Hospital in Edinburgh, Scotland

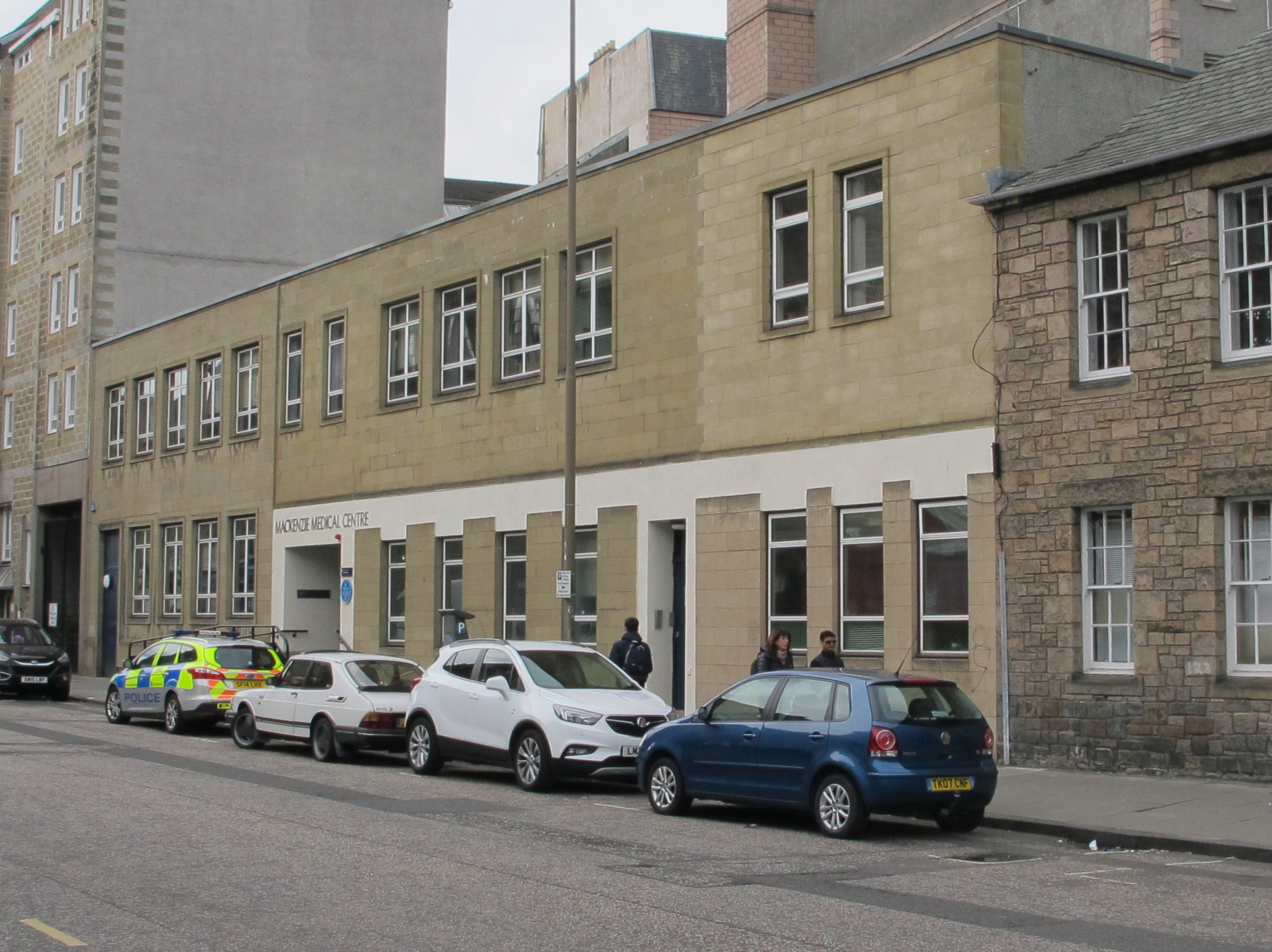
- Mackenzie Medical Centre

- Shown in Edinburgh

Geography
- Location: Edinburgh, Scotland.
- Coordinates: 55.9456°N 3.1836°W

History
- Founded: 1776
- Closed: 1963

Links
- Other links: List of hospitals in Scotland

The Public Dispensary of Edinburgh was the first free-of-charge hospital in Scotland.

== History ==
Edinburgh has a history of providing free medical care to the poor. In first meeting of the Royal College of Physicians of Edinburgh, in 1681, the Fellows drew up a scheme to provide free medical care for the poor of Edinburgh. By the eighteenth century, Edinburgh remained overcrowded, disease-ridden, and overflowing with the poor. In 1705, the Fellows at the Royal College of Physicians of Edinburgh unanimously agreed to continue providing medical aid for the poor by two Fellows per year at their new premises in Fountain Close. This "Dispensary" service continued at Fountain Close until 1729 when it transferred to the new "Physicians’ Hospital or Infirmary for the Sick and Poor."

A Dispensary for the Infant Poor had already been established in London in 1769, although it did not survive, and the idea expanded. By 1776, Dispensaries had been established across England. Edinburgh's public dispensary was founded in 1776 by Andrew Duncan and provided the impoverished in the city with free medical advice. It opened in West Richmond Street in 1783. The Dispensary was established and financed as a public charity from the beginning and was an extension of Duncan's teaching program. Patients attending the Dispensary received free medicines and advice and in return agreed to be demonstrations in Duncan's classes.

In June 1815, William Pulteney Alison and other Fellows of the Public Dispensary of Edinburgh founded another public dispensary in Edinburgh's New Town. Alison felt a second dispensary was justified to meet the demands of the city's poor. The Royal Dispensary was only open two days a week and had no established system for home visiting. It received a royal charter on 13 January 1818, becoming the Royal Public Dispensary of Edinburgh.

The trustees of the Royal Dispensary donated their building at West Richmond Street and its remaining funds to the University of Edinburgh in 1963. The University refurbished the building and renamed it the Mackenzie Medical Centre, after Sir James Mackenzie, a general practitioner. The Royal Dispensary also endowed the first Chair of General Practice in the world, at the University of Edinburgh, to which Richard Scott was appointed later that year.
