= Manneville-la-Raoult =

- Commune
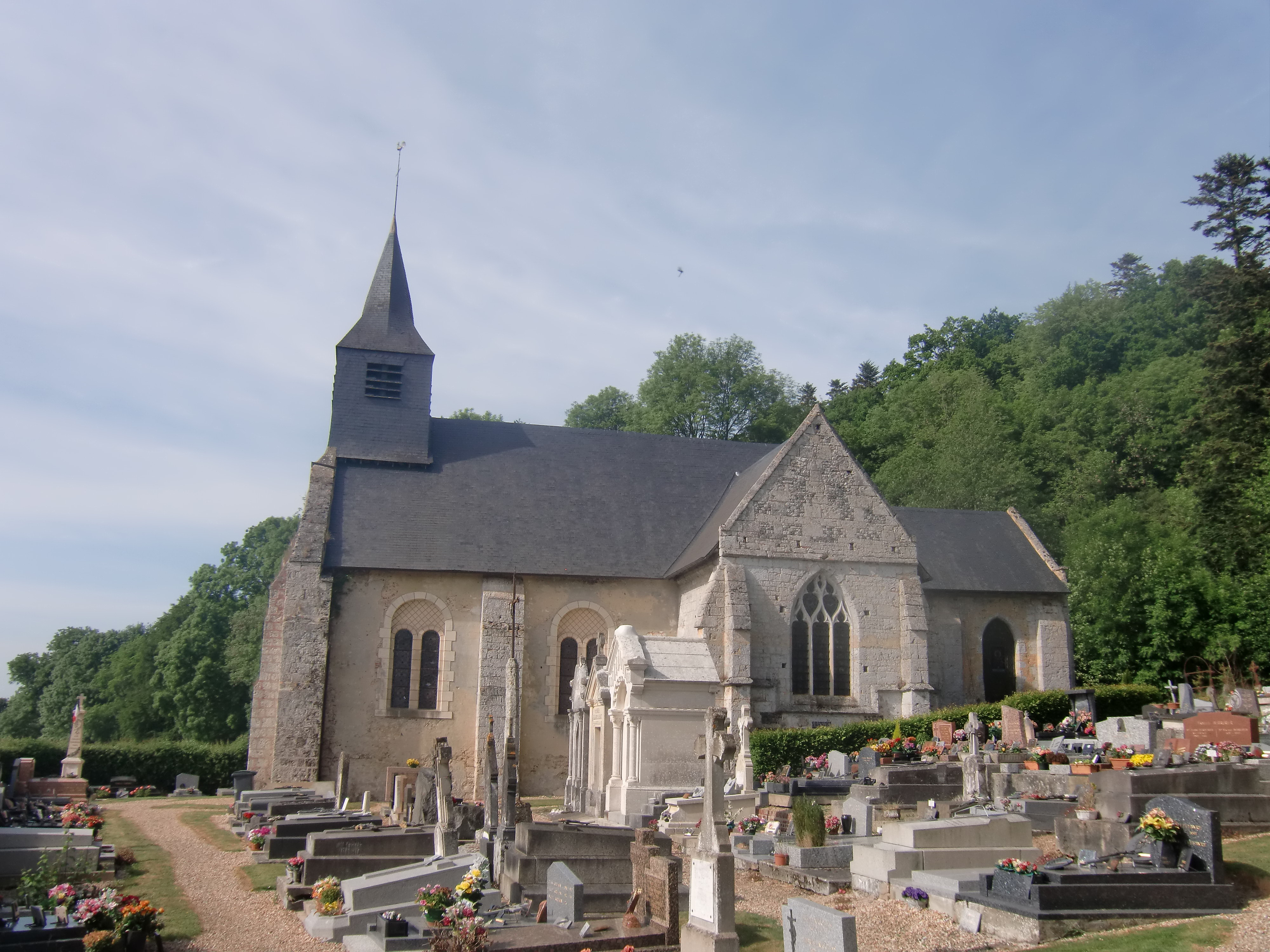
- The church in Manneville-la-Raoult
- Location of Manneville-la-Raoult
- Location within France Location within Normandy
- Coordinates: 49°22′26″N 0°19′01″E
- Country: France
- Region: Normandy
- Department: Eure
- Arrondissement: Bernay
- Canton: Beuzeville

Government
  - Mayor (2020–2026): Luc Fontaine
- Area^{1}: 7.37 km^{2} (2.85 sq mi)
- Elevation: 73 m (240 ft)
- Highest elevation: 128 m (420 ft)
- Lowest elevation: 17 m (56 ft)
- Population (2023): 474
  - Density: 64.3/km^{2} (167/sq mi)
- Time zone: UTC+01:00 (CET)
  - Summer (DST): UTC+02:00 (CEST)
- INSEE/Postal code: 27384 /27210
- ^{1} French Land Register data, which excludes lakes, ponds, glaciers > 1 km^{2} (0.386 sq mi or 247 acres) and river estuaries.

Manneville-la-Raoult (French pronunciation: [manvil la ʁaul]) is a commune in the Eure department in Normandy in northern France.

== Population ==
Historical population
Year	Pop.	±% p.a.
1968	241	—
1975	260	+1.09%
1982	331	+3.51%
1990	336	+0.19%
1999	416	+2.40%
2007	502	+2.38%
2012	509	+0.28%
2017	506	−0.12%
2023	474	−1.08%
Source: INSEE

== See also ==
- Communes of the Eure department
