= Travis Jones =

Travis Jones may refer to:

- Travis Jones (American football coach) (born 1972), former American football assistant coach; former linebacker and defensive tackle
- Travis Jones (defensive lineman) (born 1999), American football defensive tackle

== See also ==
- Travis Jonas (born 1970 or 1971), American poker dealer
- Travia Jones (born 1995), Canadian sprinter
