= Fred Scott (footballer, born 1874) =

Australian rules footballer

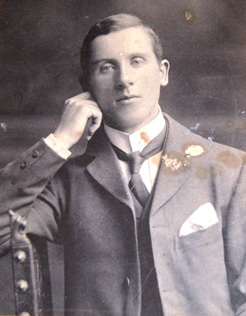

Personal information
- Full name: Frederick Charles Scott
- Born: 11 April 1874; Ulster
- Died: 8 July 1969 (aged 95); Ferntree Gully, Victoria
- Original team: Essendon District
- Position: Centre half-forward

Playing career^{1}
Years	Club	Games (Goals)
1899–1901	Essendon	33 (25)
1902–04	Carlton	17 (11)
Total		50 (36)
- ^{1} Playing statistics correct to the end of 1904.

Fred Scott (11 April 1874 – 8 July 1969) was an Australian rules footballer who played with Essendon and Carlton in the Victorian Football League (VFL).
