= Fred Scott (footballer, born 1885) =

Australian rules footballer

Personal information
- Full name: Frederick Henry Scott
- Born: 21 October 1885; Steels Creek, Victoria
- Died: 20 April 1937 (aged 51); Bentleigh, Victoria
- Original team: Yarra Glen
- Height: 177 cm (5 ft 10 in)
- Weight: 79 kg (174 lb)

Playing career^{1}
Years	Club	Games (Goals)
1910	Fitzroy	3 (1)
- ^{1} Playing statistics correct to the end of 1910.

Frederick Henry Scott (21 October 1885 – 20 April 1937) was an Australian rules footballer who played with Fitzroy in the Victorian Football League (VFL).
