= Lee Scott =

Lee Scott may refer to:

- Lee Scott (businessman) (born 1949), American businessman and former CEO of Wal-Mart
- Lee Scott (politician) (born 1956), British former member of parliament
- K. Lee Scott (born 1950), teacher, musician, conductor and composer
- Lee Scott (rapper) (born 1985), English rapper and hip hop producer, and founder of Blah Records
