= Carlo Scott =

South African soccer player

Carlo Scott (born 5 June 1980 in Cape Town, Western Cape) is a South African association football striker who played in the Premier Soccer League for Cape Town Spurs, Ajax Cape Town, Sundowns, Moroka Swallows, Santos, and Bloemfontein Celtic. He later played for Ikapa Sporting in the National First Division.

His younger brother Romano also played for Santos.
