= Scott, Wisconsin =

Scott is the name of several places in the U.S. state of Wisconsin:

- Scott, Brown County, Wisconsin, a town
- Scott, Burnett County, Wisconsin, a town
- Scott, Columbia County, Wisconsin, a town
- Scott, Crawford County, Wisconsin, a town
- Scott, Lincoln County, Wisconsin, a town
- Scott, Monroe County, Wisconsin, a town
- Scott, Sheboygan County, Wisconsin, a town
