= Fredrick D. Scott =

- Born: September 21, 1984 (age 42); San Bernardino, CA
- Citizenship: American
- Education: Harvard University Corporate Finance Institute (CFI) Chartered Instituted of Management Accountants (CIMA)
- Known for: Private Equity Investor, Business Mentor, Philanthropist
- Criminal charges: Conspiracy to commit wire fraud, Making a materially false statement to the Securities and Exchange Commission (2014).
- Criminal penalty: 63 Month Prison Sentence, 3 Years Supervised Release, Restitution Order
- Criminal status: Released
- Website: https://fredrickdscott.com

Fredrick Douglas Scott (born September 21, 1984) is an American private equity investor, business consultant, philanthropist and contributing writer for Entrepreneur magazine, who pleaded guilty to conspiracy in 2014. In 2010 he was named one of Ebony magazine's "Top 30 Under 30", described as "the youngest African-American hedge fund founder in history", according to the Ebony article.

== Early life ==
Scott was born in San Bernardino, California, in a single parent home as the oldest of three children. After he graduated from high School he joined the United States Army.

== Education ==
Scott graduated from San Andreas High School, then went on to study at Harvard University (via edx.org). He received his Financial Modeling and Valuation Analyst (FMVA), Capital Markets and Securities Analyst (CMSA), and Commercial Banking and Credit Analyst (CBCA) designations from the Corporate Finance Institute. He earned a diploma in Islamic Finance from the Chartered Institute of Management Accountants.

== Career ==
Scott launched his career in finance in 2006 as a Mortgage Banker for Innovative Mortgage Capital. In 2007 he launched his own mortgage lending firm, FollyCease Financial which he summarily closed down at the end of 2007 due to the mortgage crisis in the United States. In 2008 he launched Acacia Conglomerate Inc., a fully service Mortgage Banking firm with offices in California and Vancouver, BC. The following year, He then launched ACI Capital Group, an investment banking and advisory firm which fraudulently reported its assets. Exiting ACI at the end of 2012, Scott launched The Scott Family Office, Intl, a single-family office structure from which he stewards his family's assets.

== Conviction ==
Fredrick was arrested in 2013 by the FBI and charged with Conspiracy to Commit Wire Fraud and Making a Materially False Statement to the Securities and Exchange Commission. His investments scheme was deemed an affinity fraud, focusing on African-American businesses. He subsequently pleaded guilty to these charges in 2014 and was sentenced to 63 months in Federal Prison, 3years of supervised release and ordered to pay restitution, he also faced civil penalties from the SEC. Fredrick's conviction has come under scrutiny by media outlets, recently, due to the fact that he was convicted of a Conspiracy in which he nor anyone else was indicted and where he was the only party ever charged in the case.

== Philanthropy ==
Fredrick is a mentor for the Stand Together Ventures Lab Unbundle Policing Incubator in the Northwestern Mutual Black Founder Accelerator, Gener8tor, The Bronze Valley Accelerator and Defy Ventures. The Scott Family Foundation Intl. (formerly the Samira and Fredrick Scott Charitable Fund) has given grants to organizations such as The National Cares Mentoring Movement and The Eagle Academy for Young Men.

=== The Scott Family Foundation Intl ===
Scott is the chairman of the board for The Scott Family Foundation Intl. as a Civil Society Organization and member of the United Nations Global Compact.

=== #GetRealWoke Podcast ===
In 2020, Scott launched the #GetRealWoke Podcast on YouTube where he provides free financial literacy and business development knowledge and resources every week. In addition, through the #GetRealWoke Podcast, Scott gives away a minimum of $1,000.00 every month.

=== Business Mentorship ===
Scott is a business mentor for the Stand Together Ventures Unbundle Policing Incubator, the Northwestern Mutual Black Founder Accelerator, Gener8tor and Defy Ventures. Through these programs and accelerators, Scott provides assistance and support to start-up and growth stage businesses relating to business development, business structuring and business strategy free of charge.

=== Social Activism ===
Scott is the vice-chairman for the National Action Networks Second Chance Committee. Here, he provides support and resources to incarcerated persons and their families. He also helps formerly incarcerated persons re-integrate into society by providing the tools and resources needed to assist them in becoming productive members of society. Additionally, through his work with Defy Ventures, Scott helps formerly incarcerated persons start and grow businesses.
