= Margaret Scott =

Margaret Scott or Maggie Scott may refer to:

- Margaret Scott (Salem witch trials) (c. 1615–1692), convicted at the Salem witch trials and hanged
- Lady Margaret Montagu Douglas Scott (1846–1918), Scottish aristocrat
- Lady Margaret Scott (golfer) (1874–1938), British golfer
- Margaret Scott (suffragette) (1888–1973), UK suffragette
- Margaret Scott (dancer) (1922–2019), South African-born Australian dancer
- Margaret Scott (New Zealand author) (1928–2014), New Zealand writer, editor and librarian
- Marilyn Waltz or Margaret Scott (1931–2006), American actress and model
- Margaret Scott (Australian author) (1934–2005), Australian author, poet and television personality
- Maggie Scott, Lady Scott (born 1960), Scottish lawyer and judge
- Maggie Scott, wife of actor Paul Freeman
- Margaret Antone Scott, American-Canadian singer-songwriter known professionally as Maggie Antone (born 2002)
- USS Margaret Scott, a U.S. Navy Stone Fleet ship
- Margaret Jane Scott Hawthorne (1869–1958), née Scott, Irish-born New Zealand trade unionist, factory inspector, and public servant
