= Judge Scott =

Judge Scott may refer to:

- Charles R. Scott (1904–1983), judge of the United States District Court for the Middle District of Florida
- George Cromwell Scott (1864–1948), judge of the United States District Court for the Northern District of Iowa
- Hugh B. Scott (born 1949), magistrate judge of United States District Court for the Western District of New York
- Irene F. Scott (1912–1997), judge of the United States Tax Court
- Jeanne E. Scott (1948–2019), judge of the United States District Court for the Central District of Illinois
- Kai Scott (born 1970), judge of the United States District Court for the Eastern District of Pennsylvania
- Nauman Scott (1916–2001), judge of the United States District Court for the Western District of Louisiana
- Thomas Scott (Florida judge) (born 1948), judge of the United States District Court for the Southern District of Florida

== See also ==
- Justice Scott (disambiguation)
