= Justice Scott =

Justice Scott may refer to:

- Christopher C. Scott (1807–1859), associate justice of the Arkansas Supreme Court
- Elmon Scott (1853–1921), associate justice of the Washington Supreme Court
- George M. Scott (Minnesota judge) (1922–2006), associate justice of the Minnesota Supreme Court
- George M. Scott (West Virginia judge) (1929–2015), associate justice of the Supreme Court of Appeals of West Virginia
- Gregory K. Scott (c. 1949–2021), associate justice of the Colorado Supreme Court
- Guy C. Scott (1863–1909), associate justice of the Supreme Court of Illinois
- James Scott (judge) (1767–1855), associate justice of the Indiana Supreme Court
- John M. Scott (1824–1898), associate justice of the Supreme Court of Illinois
- John T. Scott (Indiana judge) (1831–1891), associate justice of the Supreme Court of Indiana
- John Scott, 1st Earl of Eldon (1751–1838), Lord High Chancellor of Great Britain
- Josiah Scott (politician) (1803–1879), associate justice of the Ohio Supreme Court
- Richard H. Scott (1858–1917), justice of the Wyoming Supreme Court
- Thomas Scott (Canadian judge) (1746–1824), chief justice of Upper Canada
- Thomas Scott (Ohio judge) (1772–1856), associate justice of the Ohio Supreme Court
- Tully Scott (1857–1924), associate justice and chief justice of the Colorado Supreme Court
- Will T. Scott (born 1947), associate justice of the Kentucky Supreme Court
- William Scott (Missouri judge) (1804–1862), associate justice of the Supreme Court of Missouri
- William Scott (justice) (d. 1350s), chief justice of the King's Bench

== See also ==
- Judge Scott (disambiguation)
