= Matthew Scott (footballer, born 1867) =

English footballer

Personal information
- Full name: Matthew Scott
- Date of birth: 1867
- Place of birth: Newcastle, England
- Date of death: 1897 (aged 29–30)
- Position: Goalkeeper

Senior career*
Years	Team	Apps	(Gls)
1888–1889	Elswick Rangers		
1889–1892	Newcastle East End		
1892–1894	Sunderland	1	(0)
1894–1897	Newcastle United	0	(0)
1897–1???	South Shields		
- * Club domestic league appearances and goals

Matthew Scott (1867 – 1897) was an English professional footballer who played as a goalkeeper for Sunderland.
