= Travis Nelson =

Travis Nelson may refer to:

- Travis Nelson (politician), American politician and nurse
- Travis Nelson (actor), Canadian actor

== See also ==
- Travis Nelsen, former drummer for Okkervil River
