= Henry W. Scott =

- Born: Henry Wilson Scott; 1866; Berlin, Illinois, US
- Died: July 8, 1935 (aged 68–69); Rice, Kansas, US
- Occupations: Attorney, judge, author, editor
- Years active: 1885-1935
- Known for: Associate Justice of the Oklahoma Territorial Supreme Court; Chief Justice (1 year)

Henry Wilson Scott (1866–1935), also known as Henry W. Scott or H. W. Scott, was a native of Illinois, who moved with his parental family while he was growing up. First to Iowa, then to Kansas, where Henry completed high school. After reading the law under the supervision of William J. Fuller, Esq., he was admitted to the bar in 1884. Scott opened a private law practice in Larned, Kansas until 1891, when he moved to Oklahoma City, then the second largest city in Oklahoma Territory.

In 1893, President Grover Cleveland appointed Scott as the first Chief Justice for the Oklahoma Territorial Supreme Court. Republican William McKinley captured the U.S. Presidency in 1894, putting the Territorial Court position in play for a new occupant. Usually, all territorial officials understood the patronage system of the U.S. government and submitted their resignations promptly, but apparently Justice Scott did not follow the custom. As a result, Scott made himself a target for harassment by Republican officials until he finally resigned in 1896, leaving Oklahoma Territory for permanently.

== Early life and education ==
Henry W. Scott was born in Berlin, Sangamon County, Illinois on January 26, 1866. His father was Caleb L. Scott, also born in Berlin, Illinois, and his mother was Charlotte K. Templeton, a native of Ohio. He moved with his parents to Allerton, Iowa in 1876, then the family moved two years later to Hodgeman County, Kansas, near the present town of Burdette, Kansas. In 1880, they moved to Rice County, Kansas, where he graduated from Lyons High School. After graduation, he studied law under William J. Fuller, Esq. He was admitted to the bar in the spring of 1884, then went to Des Moines, Iowa and joined a law firm owned by a cousin. He returned to Lyons in the spring of 1885, and joined as a law partner with William Fuller. In the winter of that year, he moved again to Hodgeman Center, in Hodgeman County, where he became editor of the Scimeter (sic). That summer, he learned that Hodgeman Center would not become the new county seat, so he sold his property there and moved to Jetmore, Kansas. During 1885-6, he wrote a book, Scott's Probate Law and Practice. He even found time to sue W. R. Brownlee, Register of the Land Office at Larned, Kansas. Six months later, Brownlee lost both the suit and his appointment. In 1889, he joined the law firm of Cline and Scott in Larned.

In 1890, Scott declined to be the Democratic nominee for U.S. Congress from the 7th District of Kansas throwing his support to Jerry Simpson. In the fall, he ran as an independent for Judge of the 16th District, but lost the race by five votes. He spent the following winter and spring writing another book, Distinguished American Lawyers. (Note: Reportedly, the book had a very favorable reception.)

== Move to Oklahoma Territory ==
In 1891, Scott moved to Oklahoma City, then the second city of Oklahoma Territory. In the fall of 1893, President Grover Cleveland appointed him as an Associate Justice of the Oklahoma Territory Supreme Court. He replaced John J. Clark, a Republican. Assigned to the 3rd Judicial District, which covered Cleveland and Pottawatomie Counties. He remained in that position until 1896, when he resigned and moved to New York City, intending to practice law there. He was succeeded by Justice James R. Keaton.

According to Thoburn's book,Standard History of Oklahoma Scott had originally applied for appointment as a federal attorney on the United States District Court of Oklahoma. Instead, he had been appointed to the Territorial Supreme Court. He was a supporter of William Jennings Bryan, rather than the more conservative President Cleveland. It was enough to earn him the animosity of at least two wealthy and influential newspaper publishers, Burton Brown, who ran the Oklahoma City Daily Times Journal, and later Frank McMaster, who was the boss of the Oklahoma Press and Democrat. Their criticisms became so vitriolic that Judge Scott sent each of them to jail, charging them with "Contempt of Court." They stayed until Scott was summoned to Guthrie on another matter, then got released by Oklahoma County Judge S. A. Stewart on a habeas corpus plea. When Scott returned and found the pair no longer in custody, he simply revived the contempt charge to return them to the jail. Judge Scott was called to Guthrie a second time, so while he was away, Brown and McMaster were released by Oklahoma County Sheriff Fightmaster. Scott simply had his antagonists re-arrested. This time he prepared an order stating that if Brown and McMaster were released, the sheriff would be held responsible and removed from office.

Oklahoma Territory had two non-voting representatives in Congress, both belonging to the Republican party, Dennis T. Flynn and David A. Harvey, and who were regarded as the unofficial party leaders for the territory. Flynn led a drive to investigate the finances of federal court expenses in the territory. He was able to get enough Republican support to call a grand jury, who proceeded with the task. The grand jury found a rather small amount of expense report padding, but too little evidence to prosecute either the marshal or Justice Scott. However, a propaganda campaign (spurred by the Oklahoma City Daily Times Journal) bore the brunt of it. Republican-leaning press echoed party sentiment against the Democratic judge until he left office. The Times Journal recommended that the attorney general looked harder until he realized, that he must,"...rid this judicial district of the incubus that now rests upon it."

== Departure from Oklahoma Territory ==
An item in The American Lawyer (byline Guthrie, Oklahoma) offered the following information: "Judge Henry W Scott from Oklahoma City, who is in New York, writes a prominent Democrat here that he has asked Attorney-General Harmon to accept his resignation at once, as he has formed a partnership in New York city. It is understood that Judge Tarsney will be transferred to Scott's district and that ex-congressman Bynum will be given Tarsney's district in Western Oklahoma."

== Publications ==
Scott is credited with authoring:

- Scott's Probate Law and Practice
- Distinguished American Lawyers
- History and Development of Courts of the State of New York
- The Evolution of Law, Historical Review
- The Evolution of Law, Commentary:Laws of Nations
- Scott's Police Powers
- The Evolution of Corporations and Corporate Laws
- Uniform Marriage and Divorce

In 1909, Scott published his last book, The Courts of the State of New York: Their History, Development and Jurisdiction.

== Death ==
Judge Scott reportedly died in Rice County, Kansas, on July 8, 1935.
