= Garry Scott =

Australian rules footballer (born 1954)

Personal information
- Full name: Garry Scott
- Born: 24 February 1954 (age 72)
- Original team: Clayton
- Height: 183 cm (6 ft 0 in)
- Weight: 71 kg (157 lb)

Playing career^{1}
| Years | Club | Games (Goals) |
| 1975 | South Melbourne | 6 (7) |
- ^{1} Playing statistics correct to the end of 1975.

Garry Scott (born 24 February 1954) is a former Australian rules footballer who played with South Melbourne in the Victorian Football League (VFL).
