= Daniel Scott =

Daniel Scott may refer to:

- Daniel Scott (actor) (?–2014), Australian actor
- Daniel Scott (American football) (born 1998), American football player
- Daniel Scott (basketball) (born 1953), Cuban Olympic basketball player
- Daniel Scott (harbourmaster) (1800–1865), Fremantle harbourmaster, Chair of Fremantle Town
- Daniel Scott (writer) (born 1963), American fiction writer
- Daniel Scott (lexicographer) (1694–1759), English nonconformist minister, theological writer and lexicographer
- Daniel Scott (soccer) (born 1986), American soccer player
