= Scut =

Scut or SCUT may refer to:

- Adam Scut (fl. 1382–1401), English politician
- Scut Farkus, a fictional character in the film A Christmas Story
- South China University of Technology (pinyin: Huánán Lǐgōng Dàxué), a public university in Guangzhou, China

== See also ==
- Scute or scutum, a bony plate or scale overlaid with horn, on animals
