= Richard Scott (doctor) =

Scottish medical doctor and general practitioner

- Born: 1914
- Died: 28 November 1983 (aged 68–69)
- Education: University of Edinburgh
- Years active: 1936–1979
- Known for: first professor of general practice
- Medical career
- Profession: doctor
- Field: General Practitioner

Richard Scott FRCGP (1914 – 28 November 1983) was a Scottish medical doctor who was the first professor of general practice. He worked as an academic general practitioner (GP) in Edinburgh. He was involved with setting up the first ever university general practice in 1948, developed the University of Edinburgh's general practice teaching unit and in 1963 was appointed to the first academic chair in general practice.

== Early life ==
Richard Scott was born in 1914. He was educated at Beath High School in Fife. He studied at the University of Edinburgh and graduated with an MB ChB in 1936. While working in general practice, he completed a research for an MD degree. He served in the Royal Army Medical Corps 1939 to 1945 during which time he attained the rank of lieutenant colonel. During this time he was posted to locations in North Africa, Sicily, Italy and India.

== Academic GP ==
After demobilisation he studied for a Diploma in Public Health and having performed the best was awarded the gold medal. In 1946 Scott was appointed as a lecturer in the department of public health and social medicine at the University of Edinburgh. With the introduction of the National Health Service, dispensaries were no longer needed. In Edinburgh, the premises of Royal Public Dispensary of Edinburgh in West Richmond Street was converted into the first ever university general practice. On 5 July 1948, Scott's general medical practice opened to serve the health needs of a local community while also having academic links to the University of Edinburgh.

In 1952, the University received a grant from the Rockefeller Foundation. A second practice was acquired by the university, and Scott was appointed director of the general practice teaching unit. During that decade the University of Edinburgh's general practice teaching unit was developed.

In 1963, the General Practice Teaching Unit became the Department of General Practice, the world's first independent department of General Practice. Scott was appointed as the James Mackenzie Professor of General Practice, the first person to be a professor in that clinical specialty. He gave his inaugural lecture on 19 February 1964. He gave the eleventh James MacKenzie lecture in the Great Hall of Tavistock House on 21 November 1964. He gave the Albert Wander Lecture in 1967 on "Academic Departments of General Practice".

The Royal College of General Practitioners (RCGP) formed in 1952 and Scott was honorary secretary of the RCGP's Scottish Council 1953–1969. He retired from medicine in 1979. He died on 28 November 1983, at the age of 69, after a long illness.

== Awards and honours ==
In 1979, he received the Baron Dr ver Heyden de Lancey Memorial Award.

== Personal life ==
He married Ella and they had two daughters and three sons.

== Memorials ==
A lecture is held annually by the University of Edinburgh, which is named in his honour. A blue plaque was unveiled on Mackenzie House in June 2017.
