= Travis Scott (disambiguation) =

Travis Scott (born 1991) is an American rapper and record producer.

Travis Scott may also refer to:

- Travis Scott (ice hockey) (born 1975), Canadian ice hockey player
- Travis Scott (American football) (born 1979), American football player
- Travis Scott, character in The Sims 4 and various games in the MySims series

== See also ==
- Scott Travis (born 1961), American rock musician
