= Patrick Scot =

Scottish official, tutor and author

Patrick Scot (fl. 1620) was a Scottish official, tutor and author.

== Life ==
He followed James VI of Scotland to England on his accession in 1603. In June 1618 he was engaged in the work of raising voluntary gifts for the supply of the king's exchequer by threatening persons with prosecutions for usury. Six years later (August 1624) King James I wrote a letter of recommendation on his behalf.

Scot apparently acted as occasional tutor to Prince Charles. In 1623 and 1625 he was in Amsterdam, and observed the separatist churches there.

== Works ==
Scot's position resembled those of Joseph Hall and Thomas Tymme, with emphasis on unity of doctrine. He attacked alchemy, in particular, as example of curiosity, leading to skepticism, leading to a large-scale questioning of orthodoxy. His writings include:

- Omnibus et singulis affording matter profitable for all men, necessarie for every man, alluding to a father's advice or last will to his sonne, London, 1619; (dedicated to King James and Prince Charles). At the end are some verses, "ad serenissimam Magnæ Britanniæ Annam reginam defunctam". The work was rearranged and revised as A Father's Advice or Last Will to his Son, London, 1620.
- Calderwood's Recantation, or a Tripartite Discourse directed to such of the Ministrie and others in Scotland that refuse Conformitie to the Ordinances of the Church, &c., London, 1622 (epistle to the reader dated from Amsterdam, 29 November 1622).
- The Tillage of Light, or a True Discoverie of the Philosophical Elixir commonly called the philosopher's stone, London, 1623. Dedicated to James Hamilton, 2nd Marquess of Hamilton. It is a hermetic and ethical work, denying alchemical transmutation.
- Vox Vera, or observations from Amsterdam examining the late insolencies of some pseudo-puritans separatists from the church of Great Britaine, London, 1625.

== Notes ==
Attribution

This article incorporates text from a publication now in the public domain: "Scott, Patrick". Dictionary of National Biography. London: Smith, Elder & Co. 1885–1900.
