= Sondra Blake =

American actress and dancer

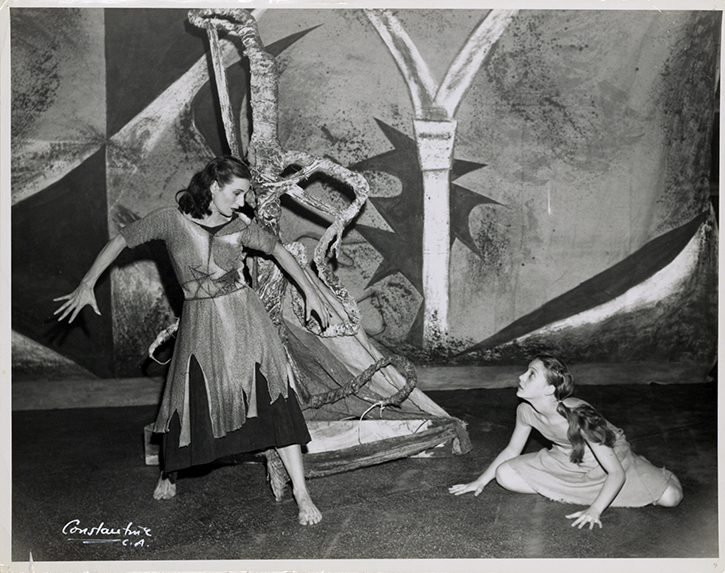
- Blake (right), then known as Sondra Orans, with Bella Lewitzky in Lester Horton's Warsaw Ghetto, 1949
- Born: Sondra Orans; August 17, 1936 (age 90); Los Angeles, California, U.S.
- Other names: Sondra Kerr; Sondra Kerr Blake
- Occupations: Actress, dancer
- Spouse: Robert Blake (m. 1961; div. 1983)
- Children: 2

Sondra Blake (born Sondra Orans; August 17, 1936) is an American actress and former dancer. She began her professional career as a teenage member of choreographer Lester Horton's Dance Theater in Los Angeles, appearing in works including Warsaw Ghetto, A Bouquet for Molly, Brown County, Indiana and Salome. Performing first under her birth name and later as Sondra Kerr, she transitioned from dance into acting and went on to a career in theater, film and television spanning more than seven decades.

Her screen work includes The Killer Elite (1975), Helter Skelter (1976), Bound for Glory (1976), Second-Hand Hearts (1981), as well as appearances on television series including Gunsmoke, Mission: Impossible, Mannix, Baretta, The Rockford Files, Quincy, M.E., and ER.

== Early life and dance career ==
Blake was born Sondra Orans in Los Angeles, California. A dance prodigy from an early age, she became a member of Lester Horton's Dance Theater while still a teenager.

In 1949, at the age of 13, Blake made her debut with Horton's company in Warsaw Ghetto, a dance work inspired by the Holocaust. She appeared in the production with Bella Lewitzky. A photograph of Lewitzky and Blake in Warsaw Ghetto is preserved in the Lester Horton Dance Theater Collection at the Library of Congress and was later included in the library's exhibition Politics and the Dancing Body.

By early 1950, Blake was in her second season with Dance Theater. Reviewing Horton's Choreo 1950, critic Margaret Harford noted that Blake looked young enough "to be skipping rope rather than dancing with a professional company" but wrote that she held her own among the older dancers and showed considerable promise.

During the 1950 season, Blake appeared in Horton's A Bouquet for Molly and Brown County, Indiana. In the latter she performed as a principal alongside Carmen de Lavallade, who would become one of the major figures in American modern dance.

Blake also performed in Horton's Salome. When dancer and designer Rudi Gernreich was forced to withdraw from the company on medical orders, his role was reworked for the 13-year-old Blake.

She subsequently moved into television dance work. By 1952 she was appearing on bandleader Jerry Fielding's television program on KNXT. In 1953, she returned to the Lester Horton Dancers as a featured soloist for Choreo '53 at the Wilshire Ebell Theatre.

== Annie Get Your Gun and transition to acting ==
By the 1950s, Blake was performing professionally under the name Sondra Kerr. In 1957, she appeared as a dancer in the West Coast production of Irving Berlin's Annie Get Your Gun, starring Mary Martin as Annie Oakley and John Raitt as Frank Butler. The production played the Curran Theatre in San Francisco before moving to Los Angeles.

Blake also appeared in the 1957 NBC television production of Annie Get Your Gun, again starring Martin and Raitt.

As she transitioned from dance into acting, Blake studied with Sanford Meisner, Lee Strasberg, Stella Adler and Martin Landau. She became a member of The Actors Studio.

By 1960, she was working on the Los Angeles stage. Performing as Sondra Kerr, she appeared in William Inge's Bus Stop at the Alley Theater in Panorama City. A review singled out her and Frank Converse as the principal reasons for the production's success and praised her performance as "the reluctant object of the young cowboy's affections."

The following year, Blake appeared at the Pasadena Playhouse in Make a Million, a comedy starring Jackie Coogan.

== Film and television career ==
During the 1960s, Blake began working regularly in film and television, initially credited as Sondra Kerr. Her early television appearances include The Tom Ewell Show, Thriller, Gunsmoke, The Untouchables, The Alfred Hitchcock Hour, Rawhide and the pilot episode of Mission: Impossible starring Steven Hill. Other TV credits over the years include Mannix, Harry O, Baretta, Kojak, The Rockford Files, Quincy, M.E., the soap opera Days of Our Lives as Erlene, and ER.

Blake also played Ronnie Howard in the 1976 television miniseries Helter Skelter, based on the investigation and prosecution of the Charles Manson murders. The two-part CBS production became a major television event. Its concluding installment led the national Nielsen ratings and was watched in an estimated 26 million American homes, drawing a larger audience than that year's Academy Awards broadcast.

Her feature film debut was in 1962's The Interns. She went on to appear in Franklin J. Schaffner's The Stripper with Joanne Woodward; Sam Peckinpah's The Killer Elite, starring James Caan and Robert Duvall; and Hal Ashby's Bound for Glory, the film biography of folk singer Woody Guthrie. She also appears in Ashby's Second-Hand Hearts. Other feature and television films over the years include Of Mice and Men, The Killing of Randy Webster as Jennifer Jason Leigh's mother, and the Joe Dancer TV trilogy as Charlie the paraplegic girl Friday.

In 2013, Blake guest-starred as Marian in the episode "The Golden Ghouls" of the web comedy series Ghost Ghirls, executive-produced by Jack Black and directed by Jeremy Konner.

In 2016, she starred in The Caretaker, for which she won Best Supporting Actress at the Chicago Indie Horror Film Fest.

In 2024, Blake appeared as herself in the documentary Seeking Mavis Beacon, about the search for Renée L'Espérance, the woman who became the original face of Mavis Beacon Teaches Typing, the popular computer typing program. In the film, Blake recounts that while shopping with her then-boyfriend Les Crane, a co-creator of the program, she noticed L'Espérance working at a Beverly Hills department store and brought her to Crane's attention. L'Espérance was subsequently chosen to portray Mavis Beacon, a fictional Black typing instructor who became a widely recognizable figure and an inspiration to many young Black students, including the filmmakers, who set out to find the woman behind the character.

== Theater ==
Blake continued to perform onstage throughout her screen career.

In 1999, Blake played Mother in Tennessee Williams' The Long Goodbye, directed by Barry Primus at the William Alderson Studio Theatre in West Hollywood. The play was presented as part of Voices of the 20th Century, an evening of one-act plays.

In 2001, she appeared opposite Richard Lynch in Leonard Melfi's two-character play Rusty and Rico, directed by Susan Peretz at the Third Street Theatre in Los Angeles.

In 2004, billed as Sondra Kerr Blake, she played Ella in Michael Heath's All Good Soldiers in the West Wind at Los Angeles's Greenway Court Theatre. The production also featured Omari Hardwick.

Blake has worked as an acting teacher in Los Angeles.

== Personal life ==
Blake married actor Robert Blake in 1961. The two had met after he went backstage following one of her Los Angeles stage performances. They had two children, Delinah (1966) and Noah (1965). They separated in 1982 and divorced in 1983.

On January 27, 2005, Blake testified as a prosecution witness during Robert Blake's trial for the murder of his second wife, Bonny Lee Bakley, describing his volatile behavior and his complaints that the relationship was "a big mess." Robert Blake was eventually acquitted.

In 2002, Bakley's four children filed a wrongful-death civil lawsuit against Robert Blake. In a deposition given as part of the case, Blake alleged that in the mid-1970s Robert Blake plotted to have her and her then-boyfriend, actor Steve Railsback, killed. She testified that the killings were to take place at the Beverly Hills mansion where Sharon Tate and four others had been murdered by followers of Charles Manson in 1969. According to Blake, Robert Blake intended the deaths to appear to be retribution by Manson's followers for her and Railsback's involvement in the television movie Helter Skelter, in which Railsback played Manson.

== Selected film and television credits ==
- The Stripper (1963)
- The Killer Elite (1975)
- Helter Skelter (1976)
- Bound for Glory (1976)
- Second-Hand Hearts (1981)
- Of Mice and Men (1981)
- The Killing of Randy Webster (1981)
- Max Dugan Returns (1983)
- Ghost Ghirls (2013)
- The Caretaker (2016)

== Selected stage and dance credits ==
- Warsaw Ghetto — Lester Horton Dance Theater (1949)
- A Bouquet for Molly — Lester Horton Dance Theater (1950)
- Salome — Lester Horton Dance Theater (1950)
- Brown County, Indiana — Lester Horton Dance Theater (1950)
- Annie Get Your Gun — with Mary Martin and John Raitt (1957)
- Bus Stop — Alley Theater, Los Angeles (1960)
- Make a Million — Pasadena Playhouse (1961)
- The Long Goodbye — by Tennessee Williams; directed by Barry Primus (1999)
- Rusty and Rico — with Richard Lynch; directed by Susan Peretz (2001)
- All Good Soldiers in the West Wind — Greenway Court Theatre; with Omari Hardwick (2004)
