= Alfalfa's Double =

1940 film

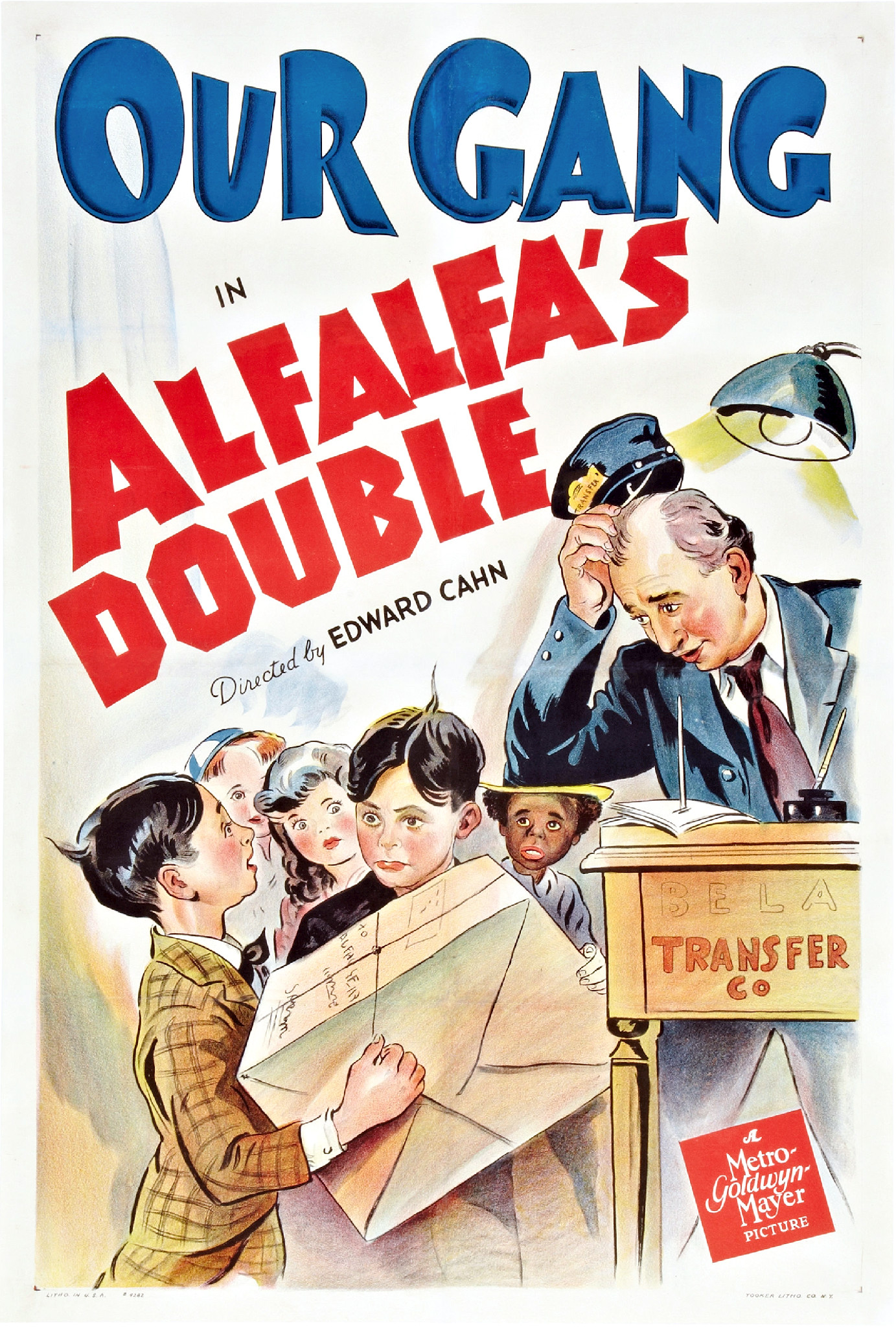
- Film poster
- Directed by: Edward Cahn
- Written by: Hal Law; Robert A. McGowan
- Produced by: Jack Chertok for MGM
- Starring: Robert Blake; Darla Hood; George 'Spanky' McFarland
- Cinematography: Sidney Wagner
- Edited by: Albert Akst
- Distributed by: Metro-Goldwyn-Mayer
- Release date: January 20, 1940
- Running time: 10:42
- Country: United States
- Language: English

Alfalfa's Double is an Our Gang short comedy film directed by Edward Cahn. It was the 186th Our Gang short to be released.

== Plot ==
Alfalfa comes face to face with his wealthy lookalike Cornelius (also played by Carl Switzer). This fateful meeting provides a golden opportunity for both boys: By trading places with his double, Alfalfa will be able to weasel out of his yard work and live a life of luxury, while Cornelius will be able to escape the rigors of dancing lessons, baths, and the like, and briefly enjoy the benefits of being a "regular kid." But the consequences of the boys' identity-trading serves only to lend credence to the old saying "Stay in your own backyard." Alfalfa is not used to the dancing lessons, formal meals, having to behave like a gentleman, minding table manners (where his meal is taken away and replaced with an artichoke), reading lessons, and an afternoon nap. Cornelius fares as bad when he has yardwork to do and finds that the rough play is not for him. In the end they secretly switch back and Alfalfa comes back to a messy yard that the gang cleaned up earlier but messed up due to the lack of help from his double.

== Cast ==
=== The Gang ===
- Carl Switzer as Alfalfa/Cornelius
- Mickey Gubitosi (later known as Robert Blake) as Mickey
- Darla Hood as Darla
- George McFarland as Spanky
- Billie Thomas as Buckwheat
- Leonard Landy as Leonard

=== Additional cast ===
- Barbara Bedford as Alfalfa's mother
- Hank Mann as Railroad attendant
- Anne O'Niel as Governess
- Milton Parsons as Willoughby

== See also ==
- Our Gang filmography
