= Dad for a Day (1939 film) =

- Directed by: Edward Cahn
- Written by: Hal A. Law; Robert A. McGowan
- Produced by: Jack Chertok for Metro-Goldwyn-Mayer
- Starring: George McFarland; Carl Switzer; Billie Thomas; Mickey Gubitosi; Darwood Kaye; Leonard Landy; Louis Jean Heydt; Peggy Shannon; Arthur Q. Bryan
- Cinematography: Jackson Rose
- Edited by: Roy Brickner
- Distributed by: Metro-Goldwyn-Mayer
- Release date: October 21, 1939
- Running time: 10:49
- Country: United States
- Language: English

Dad for a Day is a 1939 Our Gang short comedy film directed by Edward Cahn. It was the 184th Our Gang short to be released.

== Plot ==
While planning to participate in the annual Fathers and Sons Day Picnic, the Our Gang kids are reminded that their pal Mickey has no father. The kids prevail upon friendly gas-station owner Mr. Henry to act as Mickey's surrogate dad during the festivities. Not only does Mr. Henry win every competition, but he also works up enough nerve to propose to Mickey's widowed mother.

== Cast ==
=== The Gang ===
- Mickey Gubitosi as Mickey Baker
- George McFarland as Spanky
- Carl Switzer as Alfalfa
- Billie Thomas as Buckwheat
- Leonard Landy as Leonard

=== Additional cast ===
- Darwood Kaye as Club member complimenting Mickey
- Arthur Q. Bryan as Spanky's dad
- Ben Hall as Leonard's dad
- Tom Herbert as Gas station patron
- Louis Jean Heydt as Bill Henry, Mickey's surrogate dad
- Milton Parsons as Mr. Kincade, father of triplets
- Peggy Shannon as Mary Baker, Mickey's mother
- Mary Treen as Receptionist
- Walter Sande as Extra
- James Gubitosi as Club member
- Tommy McFarland as Club member
- Harold Switzer as Club member
