= Bubbling Troubles =

- Directed by: Edward Cahn
- Written by: Hal Law; Robert A. McGowan
- Produced by: Jack Chertok for MGM
- Starring: Carl Switzer; George McFarland; Darla Hood; Mickey Gubitosi; Billie Thomas; Leonard Landy; Tommy Bond
- Cinematography: Clyde De Vinna
- Edited by: Ralph Goldstien
- Distributed by: MGM
- Release date: May 25, 1940
- Running time: 10:48
- Country: United States
- Language: English

Bubbling Troubles is an American 1940 Our Gang short comedy film directed by Edward Cahn. It was the 187th Our Gang short to be released.

== Plot ==
Butch wins the heart of Darla, leaving heartbroken Alfalfa to cry in his alphabet soup. Mistaking the boy's doldrums for indigestion, Alfalfa's dad prepares to give his son a good dose of Settles-It Powder. Later on, the kids pay a visit to Butch's jerry-built chemistry lab where he is mixing up what he claims is an explosive. Recognizing the mixture as Settles-It Powder, Alfalfa offers himself as Butch's guinea pig, bravely downing the concoction in hopes of impressing Darla. Unfortunately, the powders have not been properly combined, and before long Alfalfa becomes drastically bloated and the rest of the gang is convinced that he has become a walking bomb.

== Notes ==
Tommy Bond made his final appearance with Our Gang in this film, after spending two-and-a-half years as "Butch", a recurring character and the Gang's ongoing nemesis. He also was in the Gang as a recurring character from 1932 to 1934, giving him a total of five years.

== Cast ==
=== The Gang ===
- Carl Switzer as Alfalfa
- Mickey Gubitosi as Mickey
- Darla Hood as Darla
- George McFarland as Spanky
- Billie Thomas as Buckwheat
- Leonard Landy as Leonard

=== Additional cast ===
- Tommy Bond as Butch
- Barbara Bedford as Alfalfa's mother
- Hank Mann as Butch's father
- William Newell as Alfalfa's father
- Harry Strang as explosives worker
- George the Monkey as Monkey

== See also ==
- Our Gang filmography
