= Glynn Wolfe =

American Baptist minister (1908–1997)

Glynn DeMoss Wolfe
- Born: Glynn DeMoss Wolfe; July 25, 1908; Freelandville, Indiana, U.S.
- Died: June 10, 1997 (aged 88); Redlands, California, U.S.
- Occupations: Baptist minister; hotel owner
- Spouses: >29
- Children: ≥19 (Note: It is unknown exactly how many children Wolfe had. In 1966, Watson Crews Jr. of the New York Daily News reported a figure of four. That same year, the United Press International claimed that he had 31 children. According to an Ottawa Journal article published in 1979, Wolfe alleged that he had 40 children. In 1989, Wolfe believed he had 41 children. By the time of Wolfe's death, media outlets reported his number of children as 19.)

Glynn DeMoss Wolfe (July 25, 1908 – June 10, 1997) was an American Baptist minister and hotel owner who resided in Blythe, California. Wolfe is best known for allegedly having the largest number of monogamous marriages, having married 31 different times, although one of his marriages was annulled and several remain unconfirmed.

== Biography ==
Glynn DeMoss Wolfe's father, John Wolfe, was a coal mine operator in Freelandville and the sheriff of Knox County.

In 1960, Wolfe was a candidate for justice of the peace in Las Vegas, campaigning on better retirement homes and extra assistance to elderly people. He placed last during the primaries. That same year, Wolfe was ordained a Baptist minister of the Traveler's Rest Baptist Church in Los Angeles, but "sort of lost interest" in his ministry when his license to perform marriages was revoked, and abandoned it to pursue a career as a barber.

During his 7th marriage to a woman named Mary, Wolfe bought an all-women hotel in Hollywood. He later stopped operating the hotel, and began operating a new hotel in Las Vegas.

Wolfe died on June 10, 1997 of heart disease in a nursing home Redlands, California, at the age of 88. His body went unclaimed, and he was eventually buried in Blythe. None of the 29 women he legally married, and only one of his approximately 19 children, attended the funeral service.

== Marriages ==
Between 1926 and until his death in 1997, Wolfe married 29 different women. Most of his marriages were to teenagers. In an interview with the New York Daily News, he described his young wives as "fun", saying he could "just speak their language".

Wolfe's shortest marriage lasted 19 days. Three of his marriages were to women he had previously divorced: he remarried Charlotte Devane in 1936, after divorcing earlier that year; remarried Katherine Archer in 1949 after divorcing the previous year; and remarried Sharon Goodwin in 1960 after divorcing the previous year. His 1st, 8th, 9th and 23rd marriages ended with the death of his wife. His longest marriage—to his 28th wife, Christine Camacho—lasted eleven years. His 29th wife was Bonny Lee Bakley, who was herself married ten times; she was murdered, and her last husband, Hollywood actor Robert Blake, was charged in connection with her death. He was found not guilty, but was found liable in a wrongful death lawsuit, and Bakley's murder remains unsolved.

Wolfe's final marriage took place in 1996 in Quartzsite, Arizona. He married Linda Taylor who was then the record-holder for the most-married woman, having been married 28 times. The marriage was performed as a publicity stunt, and Taylor returned to Indiana a week after the wedding.

== See also ==
- Tommy Manville
