= Joy Scouts =

- Directed by: Edward Cahn
- Written by: Hal Law; Robert A. McGowan
- Produced by: Jack Chertok for MGM
- Cinematography: Ray June
- Edited by: Roy Brickner
- Distributed by: Metro-Goldwyn-Mayer
- Release date: June 24, 1939
- Running time: 10:24
- Country: United States
- Language: English

Joy Scouts is a 1939 Our Gang short comedy film directed by Edward Cahn. It was the 180th Our Gang short to be released.

== Plot ==
Told that they are too young to join the Greenpoint Boy Scouts, the gang forms a troop of their own. Unfortunately, their camping and survival skills leave much to be desired. They pitch a tent over a well getting soaked; they burn the bacon, wieners, and fish they try to cook; get caught in a rainstorm, and get poison ivy. A flood traps the kids, but some real scouts come to the rescue.

== Notability ==
Joy Scouts marked the debut of Mickey Gubitosi. Gubitosi would eventually adopt the screen name of Robert Blake several years later but continued to be known as Mickey on the series. He would appear in nearly every succeeding Our Gang entry until production ceased in 1944.

Our Gang also gets a new director named Edward Cahn. George Sidney transfers to other directing positions at MGM and becomes a prominent director in the coming years. He would go on to direct movies such as The Harvey Girls starring Judy Garland, Viva Las Vegas starring Elvis Presley, Kiss Me Kate and Bye Bye Birdie.

== Cast ==
=== The Gang ===
- Eugene Lee as Porky
- George McFarland as Spanky
- Carl Switzer as Alfalfa
- Billie Thomas as Buckwheat
- Mickey Gubitosi as Mickey
- Leonard Landy as Leonard

=== Additional cast ===
- Forbes Murray as Scoutmaster
- The Boys Scout Troupe 59 of Los Angeles as themselves

== See also ==
- Our Gang filmography
