= Goin' Fishin' =

- Film poster
- Directed by: Edward Cahn
- Written by: Hal Law and Robert McGowan
- Produced by: Jack Chertok (uncredited); Richard Goldstone for MGM (uncredited)
- Starring: Carl "Alfalfa" Switzer; Spanky McFarland; Leonard Landy; Billie "Buckwheat" Thomas; Mickey Gubitosi; Paul Hurst
- Cinematography: Jackson Rose, A.S.C.
- Edited by: Adrienne Fazan
- Distributed by: MGM
- Release date: October 26, 1940
- Running time: 9:38
- Country: United States
- Language: English

Goin' Fishin' is a 1940 American Our Gang comedy short film directed by Edward Cahn. It was the 191st Our Gang short to be released.

== Plot ==
Hoping to get an early start on a fishing trip to the East River, the gang boards a double-decker bus at the crack of dawn. Alas, the kids' bulky fishing equipment causes nothing but discomfort for the rest of the passengers, to say nothing of the irascible bus conductor. Thanks to the gang's unintentional interference, the bus' regular pick-up and drop-off schedule is thoroughly disrupted, and even worse, it turns out that the kids are on the wrong bus.

== Cast ==
=== The Gang ===
(uncredited, in order of appearance)

- Carl "Alfalfa" Switzer
- Spanky McFarland
- Leonard Landy
- Billie "Buckwheat" Thomas
- Mickey Gubitosi

=== Additional cast ===
- Paul Hurst as bus conductor

uncredited (in order of appearance)

- Robert Homans as police officer
- Arthur Hoyt as bus passenger with mustache and glasses
- Anne O'Neal as woman accompanying bus passenger with mustache
- Ben Hall as bus passenger reacting to complaints

== See also ==
- Our Gang filmography
