= Joe Dancer =

American private detective television series

- Genre: Detective, crime
- Created by: Robert Blake
- Written by: Ed Waters
- Directed by: Reza Badiyi
- Starring: Robert Blake
- Narrated by: Robert Blake
- Country of origin: United States
- Original language: English

Production
- Executive producer: Robert Blake
- Running time: 100 minutes
- Production company: Mickey Productions (current)

Original release
- Network: NBC
- Release: 1981 – 1983

Joe Dancer is an American private detective television series starring, created, produced and narrated by Robert Blake. NBC released three television films that aired from 1981 to 1983.
