= Milton Parsons =

American actor (1904–1980)

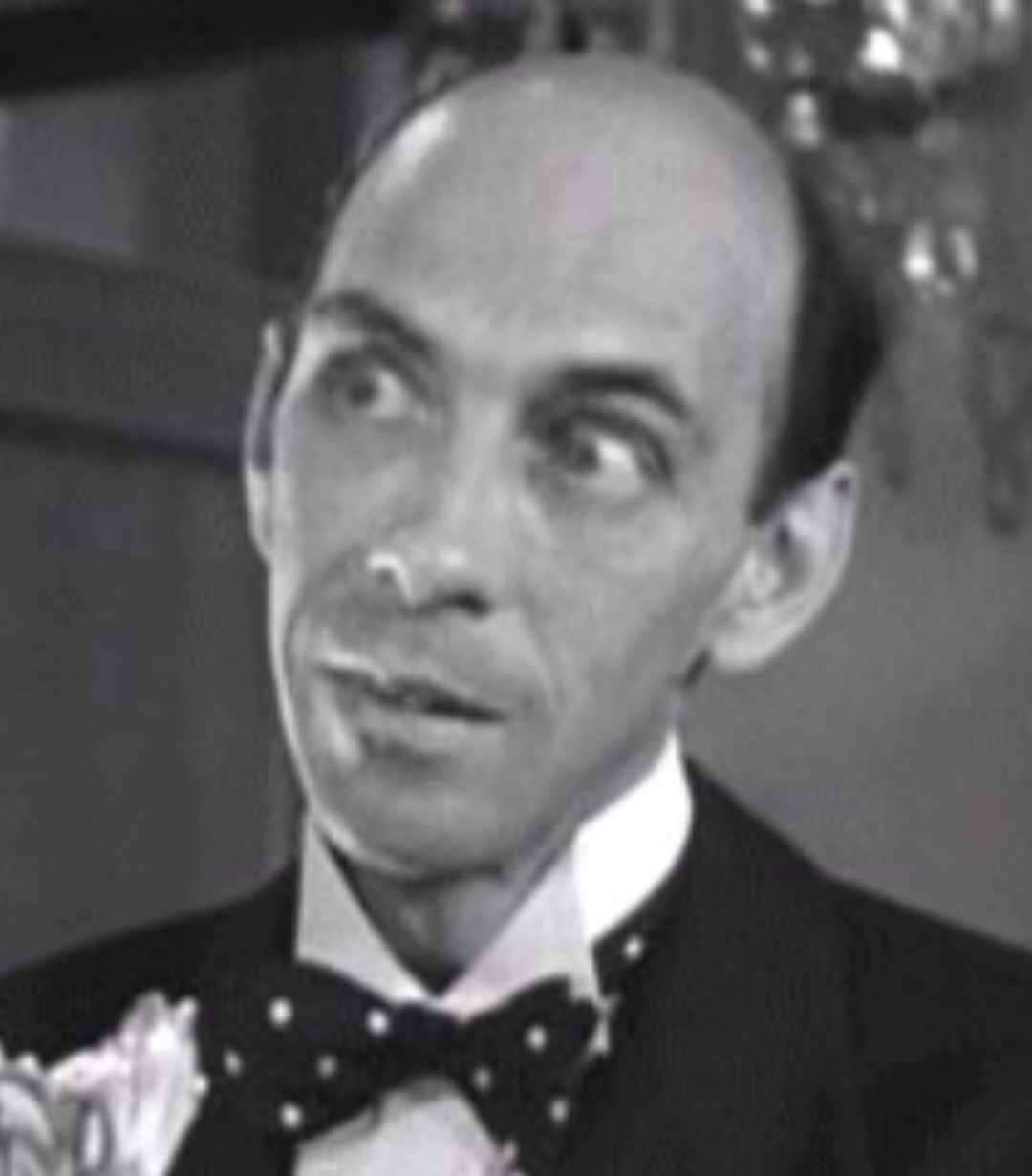
- Parsons in Dick Tracy vs. Cueball (1946)
- Born: Ernest Milton Parsons; May 19, 1904; Gloucester, Massachusetts, U.S.
- Died: May 15, 1980 (aged 75); Los Angeles County, California, U.S.
- Occupation: Actor
- Years active: 1939–1978

Ernest Milton Parsons (May 19, 1904 – May 15, 1980) was an American character actor.

== Career ==
In 1927, Parsons performed with The Strolling Players of Boston acting company. On Broadway, he portrayed James Case in Unto the Third (1933), Saul of Tarsus in The Vigil (1948), and Albert Plaschke in Now I Lay Me Down to Sleep (1950).

Milton Parsons signed with Metro-Goldwyn-Mayer in 1939 as a character actor. Bald-headed and wide-eyed, with a soft-spoken, British-accented voice (he actually hailed from Massachusetts), Parsons became typecast as morticians, coroners, mad doctors, and dangerous eccentrics, although he often played for comedy with a broad smile and bulging eyes. After one year with M-G-M, he began freelancing and worked steadily for various studios. He appeared in more than 160 films, television shows, and commercials between 1939 and 1978.

== Selected filmography ==
- When Tomorrow Comes (1939) - Mr. Henderson, the Organist (uncredited)
- Dad for a Day (1939, Short) - Mr. Kincaid (uncredited)
- Bad Little Angel (1939) - Minister at Station (uncredited)
- Another Thin Man (1939) - Coroner (uncredited)
- Judge Hardy and Son (1939) - Florist (uncredited)
- Alfalfa's Double (1940, Short) - Willoughby
- Edison, the Man (1940) - 'Acid' Graham
- We Who Are Young (1940) - Expectant Father (uncredited)
- Boom Town (1940) - Aldrich's Assistant (uncredited)
- Dr. Kildare Goes Home (1940) - Parkersville Crazy Man (uncredited)
- Sky Murder (1940) - Brock
- Third Finger, Left Hand (1940) - Arcade Photographer (uncredited)
- Who Killed Aunt Maggie? (1940) - Mr. Lloyd
- Behind the News (1940) - Eddie
- Murder Among Friends (1941) - Douglass
- Dead Men Tell (1941) - Gene LaFarge
- Cracked Nuts (1941) - Olson (uncredited)
- Hold That Ghost (1941) - Harry Hoskins (uncredited)
- Dressed to Kill (1941) - Max Allaron
- Dr. Jekyll and Mr. Hyde (1941) - Choir Master (uncredited)
- Man at Large (1941) - Mr. Sartoris
- A Close Call for Ellery Queen (1942) - Rogers' Butler
- Castle in the Desert (1942) - Arthur Fletcher
- Roxie Hart (1942) - Announcer
- The Remarkable Andrew (1942) - Purchase Agent Sam Savage
- My Favorite Blonde (1942) - Mortician
- The Girl from Alaska (1942) - Sanderson
- Fingers at the Window (1942) - Jarvis J. Banhoff - First Axe-Murderer (uncredited)
- The Great Man's Lady (1942) - Foreman (uncredited)
- Mokey (1942) - Mr. Larkspur (uncredited)
- Whispering Ghosts (1942) - Dr. Walter Bascomb
- The Man in the Trunk (1942) - Doctor Pluma
- Who Done It? (1942) - Coroner (uncredited)
- The Hidden Hand (1942) - John Channing
- Life Begins at Eight-Thirty (1942) - Radio Announcer (John's 4th Wife) (uncredited)
- Over My Dead Body (1942) - George Lawrin
- Holy Matrimony (1943) - Clerk (uncredited)
- Sweet Rosie O'Grady (1943) - Madison (uncredited)
- Rationing (1944) - Hank
- The Hitler Gang (1944) - Judge / Teacher (uncredited)
- Gambler's Choice (1944) - John Anderson (uncredited)
- Cry of the Werewolf (1944) - Adamson
- Murder in the Blue Room (1944) - Chauffeur (uncredited)
- Lost in a Harem (1944) - Crystal Gazer
- The Great John L. (1945) - Health Restaurant Waiter (uncredited)
- Murder, He Says (1945) - Hardy Sympathizer (uncredited)
- Anchors Aweigh (1945) - Man with Beard (uncredited)
- Dick Tracy (1945) - Deathridge - the Undertaker
- Leave Her to Heaven (1945) - Medcraft - Mortician (uncredited)
- Dark Alibi (1946) - Johnson
- Bowery Bombshell (1946) - Prof. Schnackenberger
- Rendezvous with Annie (1946) - Expectant Father (uncredited)
- Margie (1946) - Jefferson (uncredited)
- Rolling Home (1946) - Charlie Kane
- The Verdict (1946) - Robertson, Undertaker (uncredited)
- Dick Tracy vs. Cueball (1946) - Higby
- The Mighty McGurk (1947) - Ryan, the Undertaker (uncredited)
- Fall Guy (1947) - Unnamed Patient (uncredited)
- Calcutta (1947) - Desk Clerk (uncredited)
- Blaze of Noon (1947) - Hotel Clerk (uncredited)
- The Crimson Key (1947) - Hackett / Huntley G. Harlow (uncredited)
- They Won't Believe Me (1947) - Court Clerk (uncredited)
- I Wonder Who's Kissing Her Now (1947) - Mr. Fennabeck (uncredited)
- The Secret Life of Walter Mitty (1947) - Butler Tyler
- Gas House Kids in Hollywood (1947) - Prof. Gately Crawford
- Dick Tracy Meets Gruesome (1947) - Dr. A. Tomic
- Bury Me Dead (1947) - Waters, the Butler
- That Hagen Girl (1947) - Al - Station Agent (uncredited)
- The Senator Was Indiscreet (1947) - You Know Who
- The Judge Steps Out (1948) - Superior Court Judge (uncredited)
- The Cobra Strikes (1948) - Mr. Weems, Mortician
- Smart Woman (1948) - Witness (uncredited)
- Secret Service Investigator (1948) - Miller
- Shanghai Chest (1948) - Mr. Grail - Undertaker
- The Walls of Jericho (1948) - Joe (uncredited)
- Big Jack (1949) - Robbed Schoolmaster (uncredited)
- Outcasts of the Trail (1949) - Elias Dunkenscold
- White Heat (1949) - Willie Rolf (uncredited)
- Always Leave Them Laughing (1949) - Tony - Dishwasher (uncredited)
- Dancing in the Dark (1949) - Crossman's Butler (uncredited)
- The Capture (1950) - Thin Man
- The Jackpot (1950) - Piano Player (uncredited)
- I Love Lucy (1952) - Mr. Thurlow Season 1 Episode 34
- Somebody Loves Me (1952) - Doctor (uncredited)
- Last of the Comanches (1953) - Satterlee the Prophet
- Down Three Dark Streets (1954) - Hogarth (uncredited)
- Rogue Cop (1954) - Tucker - Interrogated 'Creep' (uncredited)
- How to Be Very, Very Popular (1955) - Mr. X - Bald Barber
- The King's Thief (1955) - Adam Urich
- Diane (1956) - Suitor (uncredited)
- The Girl Can't Help It (1956) - Broadcasting Manager (uncredited)
- The Monster That Challenged the World (1957) - Lewis Clark Dobbs (uncredited)
- Bells Are Ringing (1960) - Pedestrian Next to Barney Lampwick (uncredited)
- Elmer Gantry (1960) - Revivalist (uncredited)
- The Silent Call (1961) - Mohammed
- The Two Little Bears (1961) - Dr. Fredricks
- Rawhide (1961) – Williams in S3:E28, "Incident of the Blackstorms"
- The Notorious Landlady (1962) - Mysterious Man (uncredited)
- The Music Man (1962) - Farmer - Iowa Stubborn (uncredited)
- The Haunted Palace (1963) - Jabez Hutchinson
- The Dick Van Dyke Show (1964) - Caretaker
- Marnie (1964) - Bald Man (uncredited)
- The Scorpio Letters (1967) - Mr. Atkinson
- 2000 Years Later (1969) - Man wearing Bowler Hat in TV Control Room
- The Ghost and Mrs. Muir (1970, TV Series) - Reverend Farley
- The Brady Bunch (1972, “Power of the Press”) - Mr. Price
- Dirty O'Neil (1974) - Police Chief
