= Reza Badiyi =

Iran-American director

- Born: April 17, 1930; Arak, Imperial State of Persia
- Died: August 20, 2011 (aged 81); Los Angeles, California, U.S.
- Other name: Reza Badiei
- Education: Syracuse University
- Occupations: Film director, television director
- Years active: 1960s–2006
- Spouses: Gwendolyn Davis (divorced) Barbara Turner (m. 1968; div. 1985) Tania Harley (m. 1987)
- Children: 3

Reza Sayed Badiyi (also known as Reza Badiei; Persian: رضا بدیعی; April 17, 1930 – August 20, 2011) was an Iranian-born American film and television director. His credits also include developing the title sequence montages for Mission: Impossible, Hawaii Five-O, Get Smart, and The Mary Tyler Moore Show.

== Early life and education ==
Badiyi was born April 17, 1930, in Arak in the Imperial State of Persia. His parents were from Isfahan. He graduated from the Academy of Drama in Iran. He worked with the Audio Visual Department in Tehran, (Honarhayeh Zeeba), and completed 24 documentary films prior to leaving the country.

Badiyi moved to the United States in 1955 in order to continue his film studies at Syracuse University. He was invited by the United States Department of State to continue his studies in America after winning an international film award for Flood in Khuzestan. He graduated from Syracuse University with a degree in filmmaking.

== Career ==
Badiyi moved to Kansas to work for Calvin Co., an industrial film production company. Badiyi often worked with Robert Altman. Badiyi was assistant director on the low-budget 1957 film The Delinquents, which marked Altman's feature film directorial debut, and on the cult classic 1962 horror film Carnival of Souls.

Early in his career, he directed episodes of Get Smart, Mission: Impossible, Hawaii Five-O, The Incredible Hulk, Mannix, The Six Million Dollar Man, Starsky & Hutch, The Rockford Files and Police Squad!. He also directed the definitive "fashion show" sequence of the third season of the popular Doris Day Show. Perhaps his most famous work was crafting the briskly edited title visualization (i.e., the opening and closing credits with theme music) for the original Hawaii Five-O. There were lowlights, as well, including directing the unsold pilot for Inside O.U.T. (1971), a spy-oriented comedy for Screen Gems executive produced by Harry Ackerman and starring Bill Daily, Alan Oppenheimer, a then-up-and-coming Farrah Fawcett, and a chimp.

In the 1980s and 1990s, he directed episodes of Falcon Crest, Cagney & Lacey, Dr. Quinn, Medicine Woman, Star Trek: Deep Space Nine, Buffy the Vampire Slayer, La Femme Nikita, Sliders, Baywatch, and Early Edition.

Badiyi set a Directors Guild of America record for directing the most hours of episodic series television ever.

== Awards ==
In the mid-1970s he received the Golden Ribbon of Art award from the reigning Shah of Iran. He was honored by the Directors Guild of America for directing over 400 hours of television. In May 2010, Badiyi was honored at UCLA for his 80th birthday and his 60th year in the entertainment industry. In 2009, he was honored with a Lifetime Achievement Award at the Noor Iranian Film Festival in Los Angeles, and after he died in 2011 the festival named the award after him.

== Personal life ==
He was the father of three children.

Badiyi's first marriage, which ended in divorce, was to Gwendolyn Davis. His second marriage was to actress and writer Barbara Turner, with whom he had one daughter, Mina. By this marriage to Turner he was the stepfather of actress Jennifer Jason Leigh and Carrie Morrow. Badiyi's third and last marriage was to actress Tania Harley from 1987 until his death in 2011. From this third marriage he had two daughters, Alexis and Natasha.

=== Death ===
Badiyi died in Los Angeles, California on August 20, 2011, at the age of 81, having struggled with various health issues.

== Filmography ==
=== Director ===
This list shows a selection of entertainment directed by Reza Badiyi. He directed more than 430 television episodes from 1963 onward.

- 1969 – The Good Guys
- 1969–1972 – Mission: Impossible
- 1969–1979 – Hawaii Five-O
- 1970–1971 – The Doris Day Show
- 1974 – The Six Million Dollar Man
- 1976–1978 – Baretta
- 1977–1979 – The Rockford Files
- 1978–1980 – The Incredible Hulk
- 1982-1984 – Joe Dancer
- 1982–1988 – Cagney & Lacey
- 1985–1986 – T. J. Hooker
- 1992–1994 – In the Heat of the Night
- 1994–1996 – Star Trek: Deep Space Nine
- 1996 – Baywatch
- 1997 – The Cape
- 1997 – Buffy the Vampire Slayer
- 1997 – La Femme Nikita
- 1998–1999 – Mortal Kombat: Conquest
- 1998–1999 – Sliders
- 1999 – Early Edition
- 2003 – She Spies
- 2006 – The Way Back Home
