= Ye Olde Minstrels =

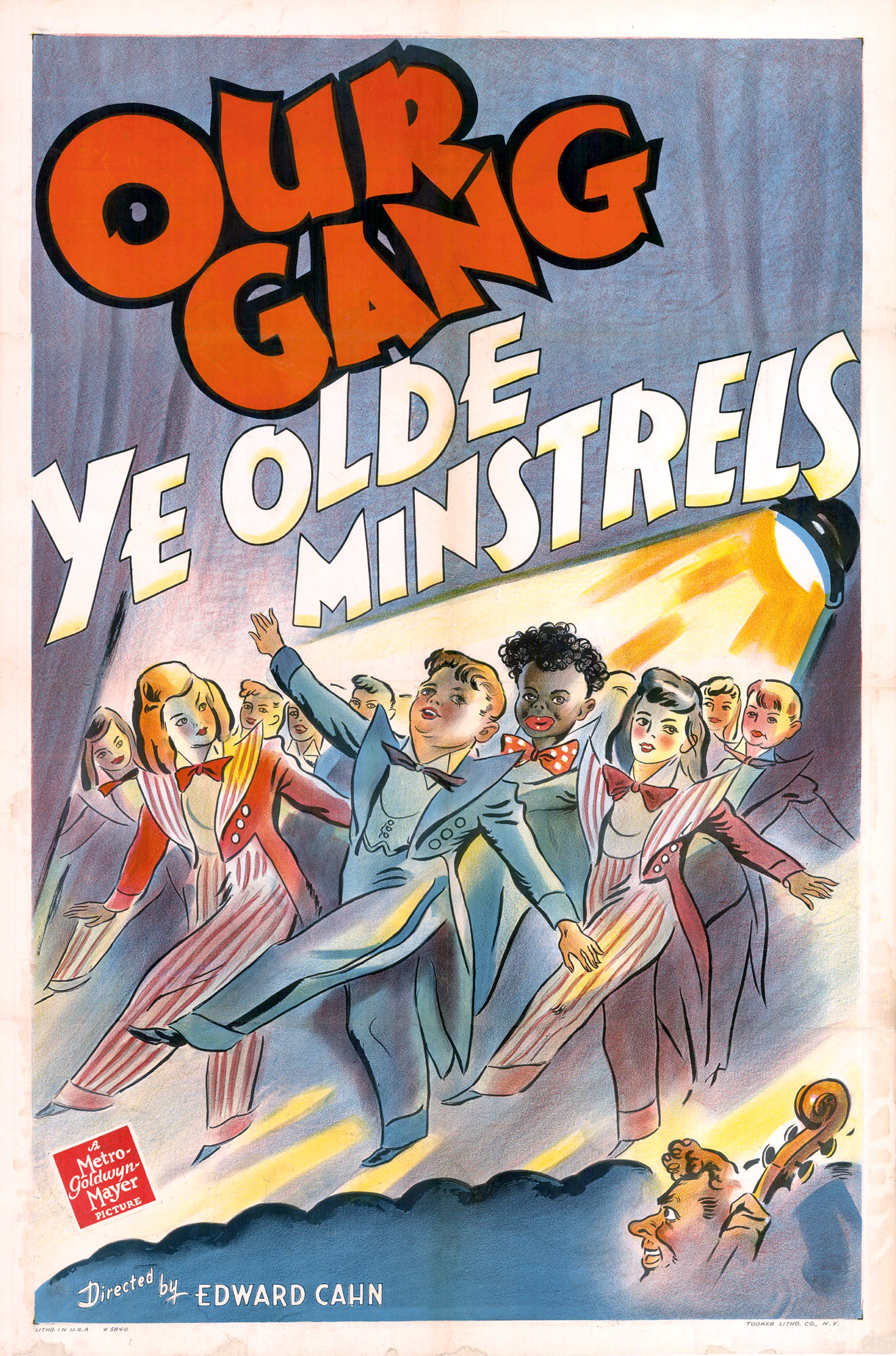
- Theatrical release poster
- Directed by: Edward Cahn
- Written by: Sam Baerwitz
- Starring: Mickey Gubitosi; Darla Hood; Billy Laughlin; George McFarland; Billie Thomas; Walter Wills
- Cinematography: Jackson Rose
- Edited by: Leon Borgeau
- Distributed by: Metro-Goldwyn-Mayer
- Release date: March 18, 1941
- Running time: 10:50
- Country: United States
- Language: English

Ye Olde Minstrels is a 1941 Our Gang short comedy film directed by Edward Cahn. It was the 197th Our Gang short to be released.

== Premise ==
To raise money for the local chapter of the Red Cross, the gang stages an old-fashioned minstrel show with the help of Froggy's uncle, played by real-life minstrel man Walter Wills. The show is a success, netting the Red Cross $208.40.

== Cast ==
=== The Gang ===
- Mickey Gubitosi as Mickey
- Darla Hood as Darla
- Billy Laughlin as Froggy
- George McFarland as Spanky
- Billie Thomas as Buckwheat

=== Additional cast ===
- Minstrel Maestro Walter Wills as himself
- Giovanna Gubitosi as Audience extra
- Tommy McFarland as Audience extra

=== Additional performers ===
Bobby Browning, Raphael Dolciame, Ralph Hodges, Dickie Humphries, Joline Karol, Valerie Lee, Priscilla Montgomery, David Polonsky, Jackie Salling

== See also ==
- Our Gang filmography
