= The Killing of Randy Webster =

1981 film directed by Sam Wanamaker

- Genre: Drama
- Written by: Scott Swanton
- Directed by: Sam Wanamaker
- Starring: Hal Holbrook; Dixie Carter; James Whitmore Jr. Jennifer Jason Leigh
- Music by: Peter Matz
- Country of origin: United States
- Original language: English

Production
- Executive producers: Tony Converse; Roger Gimbel
- Producers: Rosilyn Heller; Robert Gutwillig
- Production location: Houston
- Cinematography: Jules Brenner
- Editor: Howard S. Deane
- Running time: 100 minutes
- Production companies: EMI Television; Roger Gimbel Productions

Original release
- Network: CBS
- Release: March 11, 1981

The Killing of Randy Webster is a 1981 American made-for-television drama film based on a true story starring Hal Holbrook, Dixie Carter, James Whitmore Jr., Jennifer Jason Leigh and Sean Penn. Fact-based story of a father's tireless investigation into the killing of his teenage son by Houston police in a stolen van chase, prompted by his suspicion of police claims that the boy was carrying a gun. It originally aired March 11, 1981 on CBS.

== Cast ==
- Hal Holbrook as John Webster
- Dixie Carter as Billie Webster
- James Whitmore Jr. as Officer Vane
- Jennifer Jason Leigh as Amy Wheeler
- Nancy Malone as Lois Carter
- Gary McCleery as Randy Webster
- Barry Corbin as Nick Hanson
- Sean Penn as Don Fremont
- Sondra Blake as May Wheeler
