= Lester Horton =

American dancer and choreographer (1906–1953)

- Born: Lester Iradell Horton; January 23, 1906; Indianapolis, Indiana, U.S.
- Died: November 2, 1953 (aged 47); Los Angeles, California, U.S.
- Education: John Herron Art Institute
- Occupations: Dancer; choreographer; teacher

Lester Iradell Horton (January 23, 1906 – November 2, 1953) was an American dancer, choreographer, and teacher.

== Early years and education ==
Lester Iradell Horton was born in Indianapolis, Indiana on January 23, 1906.

His interest in dance was mainly stimulated by his fascination with American Indian culture after watching tribal dances in a Wild West show. He studied the Iroquois and Red River Indians, and Penobscot and Ojibwe tribes.

He studied ballet for two years with a local teacher in Indianapolis, Theo Hewes. At that time he also took classes at the Herron Art Institute and worked with the Indianapolis Little Theater.

Seeing a performance of the Denishawn company had a great impact on him.

== Career ==
Horton arrived in California in 1927 to perform The Song of Hiawatha, a dance-pageant by Clara Bates based on Longfellow's poem, at the Argus Bowl, a natural amphitheater in Little Rock.

He took a job with the sculptor Kathleen Stubergh, with whom he remained close for his lifetime. They produced wax figures and Horton painted faces on the window mannequins.

He chose to work in California instead of New York City, which was considered the center of modern dance at the time.

In 1931, Horton created his first solo concert choreography, Kootenai War Dance. That same year he was invited to perform this dance along with a new choreography Voodoo Ceremonial at the Los Angeles Olympics. His success garnered an invitation to perform at the Paramount Theatre on the same bill as Judy Garland and the Garland sisters for a two-week run. In 1932, Lester Horton formed his own dance company called the Lester Horton Dancers. That company evolved into what was briefly known as the Lester Horton California Ballets (1934) and then the Horton Dance Group (1934). The Horton Dance Group, billed in its film appearances as the Lester Horton Dancers, lasted until early 1944. Later, Horton attempted to develop a company on the East Coast for dancer Sonia Shaw, but Shaw's husband stopped underwriting the venture and the company collapsed before it could give any public performances.

In 1946, after a brief hiatus, Horton formed the Dance Theater of Los Angeles with his longtime leading dancer, Bella Lewitzky. He purchased a location in West Hollywood for rehearsals, performances, and teaching. It was a school, a theater, and the first space in Los Angeles dedicated to modern dance. The partnership with Lewitzky ended when she left in 1950, but Horton's final company continued until 1960 under the direction of Frank Eng.

In order to finance his school and various dance companies, Horton choreographed a number of Hollywood musicals, beginning with Moonlight in Havana (1942). Many of the films, like the Maria Montez vehicle White Savage (1943), were Universal productions, which could not rival the budgetary extravagance of MGM or Fox, though many were in Technicolor; the most notable was Arthur Lubin's Phantom of the Opera (1943). Horton's dancers also frequently worked at clubs, including the Folies Bergère in New York and Earl Carroll Theatre and Restaurant in Los Angeles. Horton's best-known works, which he called "choreodramas," are Salome (which occupied Horton for nearly two decades) and The Beloved.

Dance Theater made only one appearance in New York, during the last year of Horton's life. The troupe was scheduled to perform at the reputation-making theater of the Young Men's and young Women's Hebrew Association on East Ninety-second street in New York City. Upon arriving the troupe discovered the venue did not provide publicity and so the performance was largely unknown and not well attended. Only about 300 people showed for the Saturday night performance and only about 200 tickets were sold for the Sunday matinee. This netted the company a total of 100 dollars. All but one of the reviews were good. One magazine praised the "superb dancers" but complained that "one technical and effective stunt follows another with hardly ever any sustained choreographic continuity." There was not enough money to return home from New York and Horton had doubts about the company's financial ability to attend Jacob's Pillow later that summer. Horton's agent wired Horton the money to get the troupe home. At the time, Horton was drinking heavily and was emotionally and physically ill. Upon returning to Los Angeles he moved into a house on Mulholland Drive where he was attended to by his parents and friends.

Determined to perform at the Jacob's Pillow festival, the group travelled to the Berkshires by car. The show was a success, though Horton could not afford to accompany the troupe to the festival. Riding on their success at the festival, the troupe was asked to open for Johnny Desmond in the fall; they were so popular that they were invited back for another two-week engagement.

== Technique ==
Horton developed his own approach to dance that incorporated diverse elements including Native American Folk Dance, Japanese arm gestures, Javanese and Balinese isolations for the upper body, particularly the eyes, head and hands. Horton also included Afro-Caribbean elements, like hip circles.

Contemporary stretching based on Horton Technique

Horton's dance technique, which is now commonly known as Horton Technique, has no style, per se. The technique emphasizes a whole body, anatomical approach to dance that includes flexibility, strength, coordination and body and spatial awareness to enable unrestricted, dramatic freedom of expression.

"I am sincerely trying now to create a dance technique based entirely upon corrective exercises, created with a knowledge of human anatomy; a technique which will correct physical faults and prepare a dancer for any type of dancing he may wish to follow; a technique having all the basic movements which govern the actions of the body; combined with a knowledge of the origin of movement and a sense of artistic design." -Lester Horton, in a letter to Dorathi Bock Pierre, "From Primitive to Modern," American Dancer (October 1937)

== Death and legacy ==
Horton died of a heart attack at his home in Los Angeles on November 2, 1953.

Alvin Ailey briefly ran the company following Horton's death, but eventually moved to New York City, where in 1969 the Horton Technique became standard training for students at the Alvin Ailey American Dance Center.

Since Horton's death, his dance technique and choreography have become widely known and practiced. Horton's legacy has survived through the Lester Horton Dance Theater Foundation, Inc., which is dedicated to preserving and promoting Horton's contributions as a dancer, choreographer, and educator. Also, various dance companies such as the Joyce Trisler Danscompany focus on Horton's technique", as well as the Alvin Ailey American Dance Theatre and School.

== Notable students ==
James Truitte was later an authority on Horton's technique and choreography, and taught at University of Cincinnati – College-Conservatory of Music.

Other figures who emerged from Horton's school and company include actress Lelia Goldoni and Sondra Kerr Blake. The founder of the Mattachine Society, Harry Hay, had a daughter who took classes at the dance theater. Janet Collins, a twenty-year-old ballet student (who would go on to be the first African American dancer to perform full-time with the Metropolitan Opera in New York) was one of the students approached by Horton to perform in exchange for free classes. Collins enthusiastically agreed, and yet admitted to Horton that she knew "nothing about modern dance." Horton told her not to worry—he would teach her.

Other past students included:

- Alvin Ailey
- Eleanor Brooks
- Janet Collins
- Rudi Gernreich
- William Dale Jennings
- Joan Kerr
- Carmen de Lavallade
- Don Martin
- Bella Lewitzky
- James Mitchell
- Carl Ratcliff
- Jeri Faubion Salkin
- Joyce Trisler

== Films ==
Horton choreographed the following films:

- Moonlight in Havana, 1942
- Rhythm of the Islands, 1943
- White Savage, 1943
- Phantom of the Opera, 1943
- The Climax, 1944
- Salome, Where She Danced, 1945
- That Night With You, 1945
- Frisco Sal, 1945
- Shady Lady, 1945
- Tangier, 1946
- Siren of Atlantis, 1948
- Bagdad, 1949
- South Sea Woman, 1953
- 3-D Follies, 1953

== See also ==
- List of dancers
