= Bonny Lee Bakley =

American fraudster and murder victim (1956–2001)

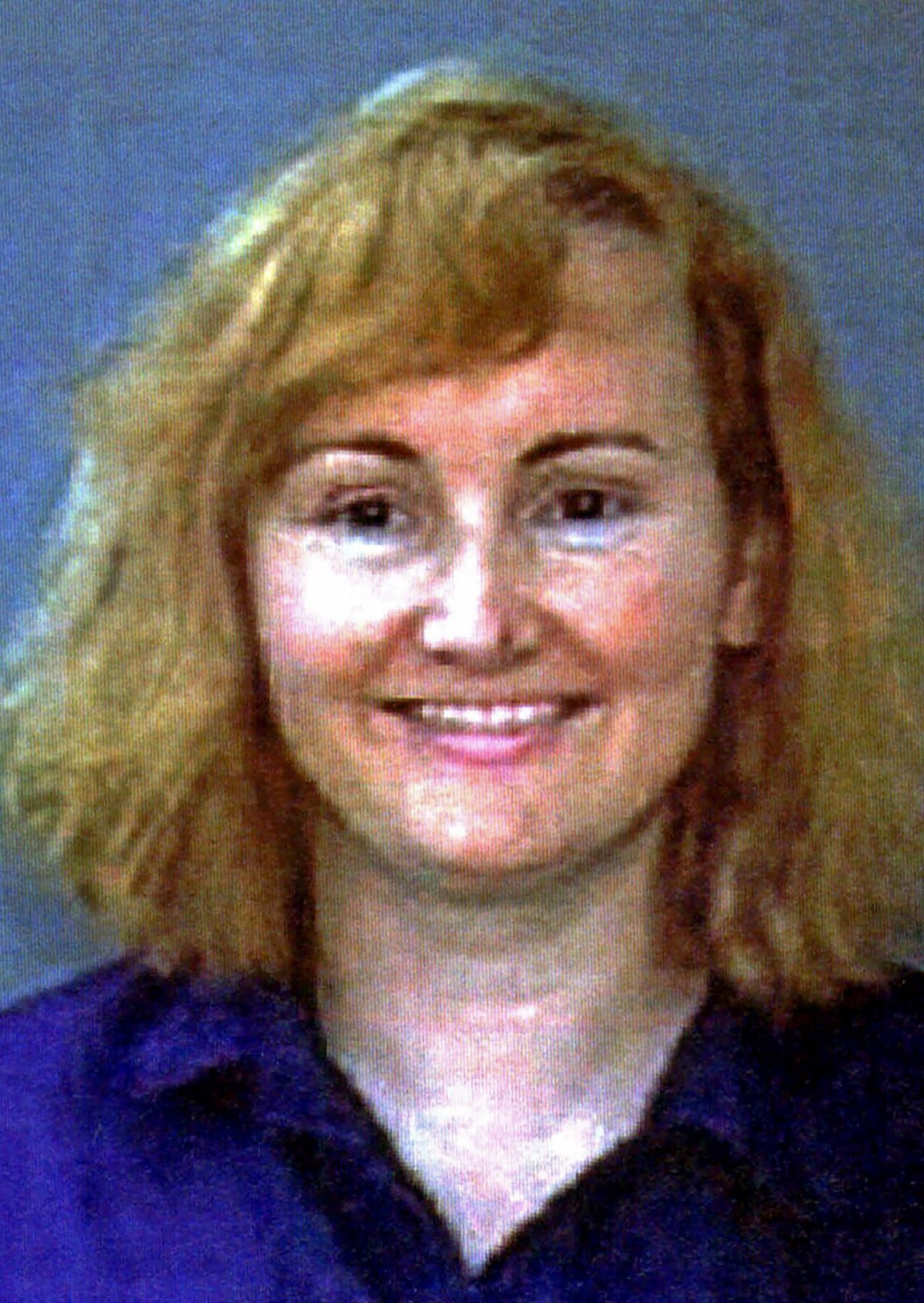
- Undated driver's license photo of Bakley
- Born: June 7, 1956; Morristown, New Jersey, U.S.
- Died: May 4, 2001 (aged 44); Los Angeles, California, U.S.
- Cause of death: Homicide by gunshot wound
- Resting place: Forest Lawn Memorial Park, Hollywood Hills
- Other name: Lee Bonney
- Spouses: Evangelos Paulakis (m. 1971; div. 1971) Paul Gawron (m. 1977; div. 1982) Robert Moon (m. 1984; div. 1987) DeMart C. Besly (m. 1988; ann. 1988) Joseph Brooksher (m. 1992; ann. 1992) William Webber (m. 1993; ann. 1993) E. Robert Telufson (m. 1994; ann. 1994) Glynn H. Wolfe (m. 1995; ann. 1995) John Ray (m. 1996; div. 1998) Robert Blake (m. 2000)
- Children: 4

Bonny Lee Bakley (June 7, 1956 – May 4, 2001) was the second wife of actor Robert Blake, who was her tenth husband. Bakley was fatally shot while sitting in Blake's parked car near a restaurant in Studio City in May 2001.

In 2002, Blake was charged with Bakley's murder, solicitation of murder, conspiracy and special circumstance of lying in wait. In March 2005, a jury found Blake not guilty of the crimes. Seven months later, Blake was found liable in a wrongful death lawsuit brought against him by Bakley's sister. Officially, Bakley's murder remains unsolved.

== Early life ==
Bonny Lee Bakley was born in Morristown, New Jersey, to arborist Edward J. Bakley and his wife, Marjorie Lois Bakley. Bakley had three siblings: Margerry Lisa Bakley, Joe Bakley, and her half-brother Peter Carlyon from her mother's second marriage. She was raised by and lived with her grandmother in Glen Gardner, New Jersey, while her mother operated an antique business at 6 Kossuth Street in Wharton, New Jersey.

Bakley dropped out of high school at age 15 and decided to go to New York City to pursue a career in modeling and acting at the Barbizon School of Modeling. There she met an immigrant named Evangelos Paulakis, who needed to get married in order to stay in the United States. Bakley agreed to marry him for a price, but then almost immediately ended the marriage; Paulakis was deported. At age 21, Bakley married her first cousin Paul Gawron. At roughly five years, this would prove to be the longest of her ten marriages, and they had two children together, Glenn and Holly. The couple divorced in 1982.

Bakley began a mail-order business sending nude pictures of women, including herself, to men. She also ran "lonely hearts" ads in magazines advertising for a "male companion". After communicating with the men who answered her ads, she would ask for money for rent or travel expenses. Bakley's business and scams eventually afforded her enough money to buy several houses in Memphis, Tennessee, and one house outside Los Angeles. She pursued a Hollywood career as a singer and actor under the stage name Lee Bonney, but was unsuccessful.

== Legal issues ==
Due to the nature of Bakley's mail-order business and other dealings, she was arrested several times. In 1989, she was arrested in Memphis for drug possession and fined $300. In 1995, she was arrested for attempting to pass two bad checks from an account of a Memphis record company; she was fined $1,000 and sentenced to work on a penal farm on weekends after she plea bargained down to lesser charges. In 1998, she was arrested in Little Rock, Arkansas, for possessing five driver's licenses and seven Social Security cards with different names. Bakley used the IDs to open various post-office boxes in order to run her "lonely hearts" scam.

== Celebrity obsession ==
Bakley had a history of pursuing celebrities, with her friends and relatives describing her as "celebrity-obsessed." Tapes of Bakley's phone conversations reveal that she was starstruck and determined to marry someone famous. "Being around celebrities," she once said, "it makes you feel better than other people."

In 1990, Bakley began pursuing singer Jerry Lee Lewis. Bakley eventually did meet Lewis and even became close friends with Lewis' sister, Linda Gail Lewis. In 1993, she claimed that the daughter she gave birth to, Jeri Lee, was Lewis' child. However, DNA tests later disproved her claim. After Jeri Lee's birth, Bakley decided to relocate to California. She left Jeri Lee with her ex-husband Paul to raise, but continued to financially support the child.

In California, Bakley pursued other celebrities, including Dean Martin, Frankie Valli (Bakley claimed they dated when she was a teenager; Valli denied the claim), and Gary Busey.

In 1991 she became interested in Christian Brando, the eldest son of Academy Award-winning actor Marlon Brando and former actress Anna Kashfi, who became a media fixture when he was tried for the murder of his half-sister's boyfriend, Dag Drollet. Brando pleaded guilty to the lesser charge of voluntary manslaughter and served five years in prison.

While Brando was in prison, Bakley began writing him and sending photos. After his release in 1996, Brando and Bakley began a romantic relationship. In 1999, Bakley discovered she was pregnant and initially thought that Brando was the child's father. In June 2000, she gave birth to her fourth child, a daughter she initially named Christian Shannon Brando.

=== Marriage to Robert Blake ===
While Bakley was involved with Christian Brando, she also dated actor Robert Blake, whom she met at a jazz club in 1999. After the birth of her daughter Christian Shannon Brando, Bakley told Blake that she was unsure of the child's paternity and that he might be the father of the child. Blake insisted on a paternity test which later determined that he, not Brando, was the father of Bakley's youngest child. After paternity was established, the child's name was legally changed to Rose Lenore Sophia Blake.

Blake agreed to marry Bakley under the condition that she sign a temporary custody agreement. Under the agreement, Bakley agreed to monitored visits with Rose and to get written permission for her friends and family to visit Blake's property. The agreement also stipulated that if either spouse decided to end the marriage, the other spouse would retain custody of Rose. Bakley's attorney advised her not to sign the document because he thought it was "lopsided". Eager to marry Blake, she ignored her attorney's advice and signed the agreement on October 4, 2000. Bakley and Blake were married in November 2000.

Although they were married, the couple never lived together. Bakley and Rose lived in a small guest house beside Blake's residence in Studio City, California. The relationship was reportedly rocky; Blake was distrustful of Bakley and hired a private investigator to find more information about her. Blake later found out that Bakley had continued to operate her "lonely hearts" scam during the marriage.

== Marriages and children ==
Before her marriage to Blake, Bakley was married nine times (many of the marriages were short-lived with one lasting a single day). Her eighth husband was Glynn Wolfe.

Bakley had four children: a son named Glenn and a daughter named Holly with her second husband Paul Gawron; a daughter named Jeri Lee Lewis (born July 28, 1993) with an unspecified man, after DNA tests disproved her claim that the child was fathered by Jerry Lee Lewis; and daughter Rose Lenore Sophia Blake (born in June 2000 and initially named Christian Shannon Brando) with actor Robert Blake.

== Death ==
On May 4, 2001, Blake took Bakley to dinner at Vitello's Restaurant on Tujunga Avenue in Studio City, Los Angeles. Afterward, Bakley was killed by a gunshot wound to the head while sitting in the passenger seat of Blake's black 1991 Dodge Stealth, which was parked on a side street around the corner from the restaurant. Blake claimed that he had returned to the restaurant to collect a gun which he had left there, and was not present when the shooting occurred. The gun that Blake said he had left in the restaurant was later determined not to have fired the shots that killed Bakley.

Bakley was buried at Forest Lawn Memorial Park in Los Angeles.

== Criminal and civil suits ==
On March 16, 2005, Blake was found not guilty of the murder of Bakley, and of one of the two counts of soliciting a former stuntman to murder her. The other count of solicitation was dropped after it was revealed that the jury was deadlocked 11–1 in favor of an acquittal. Blake's defense, led by M. Gerald Schwartzbach, attacked the credibility of associates who alleged Blake had wanted to hire them to kill Bakley, and also raised the possibility the victim was murdered by one of the men she had conned out of money in the past. Law professor Laurie Levenson stated the prosecution established a possible motive for murder (Blake's vitriol towards Bakley due to his belief she'd tricked him into fathering a child to access his wealth) but had failed beyond that to prove Blake directly or indirectly was responsible for killing her. CBS News legal analyst David Hancock wrote "there was no single part of their case that was strong enough to overcome the many weak links."

Los Angeles County District Attorney Steve Cooley, commenting on this ruling, called Blake a "miserable human being" and the jurors "incredibly stupid." Blake's defense team and members of the jury responded by stating that the prosecution had failed to prove its case. During the trial, the defense alleged that Bakley was a drug addict who used her oldest daughter, Holly, for prostitution.

On November 18, 2005, Blake was found liable for the wrongful death of his wife in a civil trial. Bakley's three eldest children had sued him, asserting that he was responsible for their mother's death. The trial included a famous Perry Mason moment when Eric Dubin, the attorney for Bakley's family, called the girlfriend of Blake's longtime bodyguard and co-defendant Earle Caldwell to the stand and asked if she believed they were involved in the crime, something no one had asked her before. "Dead silence filled the court," Dubin recalled. "Tears filled her eyes as she paused for what seemed like a decade, then leaned into the microphone and said that yes, she did believe that they were involved." The jury ordered Blake to pay $30 million.

In 2006, Blake filed for bankruptcy, with debts of $3 million for unpaid legal fees as well as state and federal taxes. On April 9, 2010, the state of California filed a tax lien against Blake for $1,110,878 in unpaid back taxes.

On April 26, 2008, an appeals court upheld the civil case verdict, but cut Blake's penalty assessment in half, to $15 million. Blake's attorneys had protested that jurors improperly discussed the Michael Jackson and O. J. Simpson verdicts during deliberations of his case, but the appeals judge ruled that such discussions were not improper.

== See also ==
- List of unsolved murders (2000–present)
