= Don Martin (dancer) =

American dancer, choreographer, and teacher

- Born: Donald R. Martin; June 20, 1931; Houston, Texas, U.S.
- Died: July 4, 2021 (aged 90); West Hollywood, California, U.S.
- Occupations: Dancer, choreographer, dance teacher
- Known for: Horton technique

Donald R. Martin (June 20, 1931 – July 4, 2021), known professionally as Don Martin, was an American dancer, choreographer, and teacher associated with Horton technique, a modern dance technique developed by Lester Horton. He performed with Lester Horton Dance Theater and was later an original member of Alvin Ailey American Dance Theater.

== Early life ==
Martin was born in Houston and moved to Los Angeles as a child. He attended Thomas Jefferson High School with Alvin Ailey and Carmen de Lavallade.

== Career ==
In the 1950s, Martin performed with Lester Horton Dance Theater and became an original member of Alvin Ailey American Dance Theater. After Horton's death in 1953, Martin worked with Frank Eng to keep the Dance Theater and its school operating until the organization closed in 1960.

The Washington Post described Martin in 1996 as a Horton expert brought to American University's Department of Performing Arts in collaboration with the Library of Congress to teach Horton technique and reconstruct Horton works.

Martin was selected to receive the Lifetime Achievement Award at the Lester Horton Dance Awards in 2003. His work Odes and Homages was performed at the event.

A 2005 Los Angeles Times review noted Martin's reconstructions of Horton's Dedication to Jose Clemente Orozco and Sarong Paramaribo, as well as Martin's own work Odes and Homages.

== Teaching and Horton technique ==
Dance Magazine identified Martin as a Horton technique teacher at the Los Angeles County School for the Arts and listed Martin and Alvin Ailey among the dancers Horton worked with while developing the technique. Martin later taught Horton technique at the Los Angeles County High School for the Arts, where he taught until he was 85. The LACHSA Foundation described Martin as a longtime faculty member and established the Don Martin Legacy Scholarship Fund in his memory.

== Death ==
Martin died on July 4, 2021, at his home in West Hollywood, California. He was 90.
