= M. Gerald Schwartzbach =

American criminal defense attorney (born 1944)

- Born: 1944 (age 81–82); Wilkes-Barre, Pennsylvania, U.S.
- Education: George Washington University Law School
- Occupation: Criminal defense attorney
- Years active: 1969–present

M. Gerald Schwartzbach (born 1944) is an American criminal defense attorney.

== Early life and career ==
Schwartzbach, the youngest of three children, was born in Wilkes-Barre, Pennsylvania. He attended Washington & Jefferson College, playing on the basketball and baseball teams. He graduated from George Washington University Law School in 1969.

He began practicing law in Detroit with the Volunteers in Service to America program. He then worked for an organization that later became the Detroit Public Defender's Office.

Schwartzbach moved to San Francisco in 1972. He worked in the Bay View-Hunter's Point neighborhood of San Francisco, representing poor families. He eventually opened a solo practice where he frequently represented indigent criminal defendants. In June 1987 he accepted an offer to become a named partner in the firm of Garry, McTernan, Stender, Walsh & Schwartzbach.

== Legal practice ==
In 1971 Schwartzbach convinced Michigan Governor William Milliken to deny a request by the Governor of Arkansas, Dale Bumpers, for the extradition of black prison escapee Lester Stiggers. At age 15, Stiggers had been convicted of the murder of his physically abusive father. The jury was composed of eleven white people and one black person and the trial lasted one day with only two witnesses heard.

In Hawkins v. Superior Court, a 1978 California Supreme Court ruling, Schwartzbach argued, and the Court ruled, that all California felony defendants had a right to a preliminary hearing, whether prosecuted by indictment (charges issued by a grand jury) or by complaint (charges filed by a district attorney).

In one of the first uses of the Battered Women's Syndrome Defense, Schwartzbach defended Delores Churchill against an attempted murder charge for shooting her police officer husband in a San Francisco Superior Court trial. Churchill was acquitted.

In 1982 Schwartzbach obtained the acquittal of Reuben Vizcarra, a "Brown Beret" activist charged with having masterminded the assassination of the Police Chief of Union City, California.

Also in 1982, in Keenan v. Superior Court, Schwartzbach persuaded the California Supreme Court to establish the presumptive right of defendants in capital murder cases to have two court-appointed attorneys.

From 1992 to 1995 Schwartzbach was chief trial counsel for Murray John Lodge, Jr. in Santa Clara County Superior Court. After two lengthy trials, Lodge received a life sentence, as opposed to the death penalty. Lodge had been convicted of a double homicide with special circumstances and an attempted murder.

Schwartzbach was one of the plaintiffs' counsel who obtained a 1999 jury verdict of almost $300 million in the personal injury/products liability case of Romo v. Ford Motor Co. The case involved a family whose parents and brother died after its 1978 Ford Bronco rolled over and the roof gave way.

=== Stephen Bingham ===
Schwartzbach was chief trial counsel for attorney Stephen Bingham, who was acquitted of conspiracy and multiple murder charges in a Marin County Superior Court trial in 1986. The case arose out of an alleged attempted escape from San Quentin Prison by Black Panther Party member George Jackson (Black Panther), an incident that resulted in the death of Jackson, two other inmates and three prison guards.

=== Richard Bandler ===
In a 1988 Santa Cruz County murder trial, Schwartzbach won the acquittal of Richard Bandler, the controversial co-founder of Neuro-Linguistic Programming. The facts underlying the prosecution involved a shooting death. Only two people other than the victim, Corine Christensen, were present when she was shot and killed, the prosecution's star witness and Bandler.

=== Glen "Buddy" Nickerson ===
In 2000 Schwartzbach persuaded Marilyn Hall Patel, Chief Judge of the United States District Court for the Northern District of California, to set aside the statute of limitations of the Antiterrorism and Effective Death Penalty Act of 1996 as it pertained to Glen "Buddy" Nickerson, a man serving a life sentence for a 1984 double murder. Patel did so based upon what she found was a persuasive showing of "actual innocence."

In March 2003, after Schwartzbach had worked 13 years to prove Nickerson's innocence and Nickerson himself had spent nearly 19 years in prison, Nickerson was freed. Nickerson's federal habeas corpus petition was granted by Judge Patel, who found that Nickerson was denied a fair trial as a result of police misconduct. She concluded that manipulation of evidence and failure to disclose exculpatory materials pervaded the law enforcement investigation and the evidence at trial. There was no physical evidence tying Nickerson to the crime of which he was convicted. Among the other factors compromising the guilty verdict was a witness misidentification. The witness initially described the culprit as an injured man weighing 200 pounds with a moustache, yet, after repeated conversations with law enforcement investigators, identified the culprit as Nickerson, an uninjured man weighing 430 pounds with a "full, shaggy beard."

=== Robert Blake ===
Representing actor Robert Blake, Schwartzbach obtained an acquittal in the actor's 2005 murder trial. The Los Angeles District Attorney's office alleged that the actor, who was famous for Our Gang and the Baretta television series, had both solicited others to kill his wife and then murdered her himself.

=== Marshawn Lynch ===
Schwartzbach represented then University of California, Berkeley football player Marshawn Lynch from late 2006 to early 2007, resulting in the Alameda County District Attorney Office's decision not to file any criminal charges against Lynch. Lynch's ex-girlfriend had accused Lynch of touching her inappropriately and threatening her. In deciding not to file charges, the District Attorney cited "grave inconsistencies" in the alleged victim's accusations, a lack of injuries, and the statement of a third party witness who said that "nothing happened." Schwartzbach subsequently obtained the revocation of a restraining order against Lynch arising out of the same alleged incident.

Schwartzbach again represented Lynch in a 2009 Culver City prosecution for carrying a loaded firearm. The case concluded with Lynch pleading guilty to a misdemeanor offense.

=== Hootan Roozrokh ===
In the first criminal prosecution of its kind in the United States, Schwartzbach represented Hootan Roozrokh in a 2009 San Luis Obispo County case arising out of an attempted organ recovery. Roozrokh, an organ transplant surgeon, was charged with attempting to hasten the death of a potential organ donor in order to procure the donor's organs while they were still viable for transplantation. The San Luis Obispo District Attorney's office investigated the case for 18 months before deciding to file charges against Roozrokh. Roozrokh was acquitted after a six-week jury trial. The Medical Board of California later withdrew its complaint against Roozrokh.

=== Memoir ===
Schwartzbach’s memoir entitled Leaning on the Arc: A Personal History of Criminal Defense was published by the American Bar Association.
