= Bella Lewitzky =

American dancer, choreographer, and teacher (1916–2004)

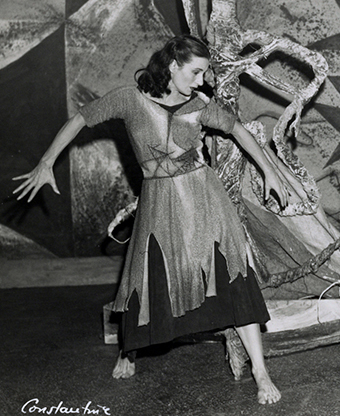
- Lewitzky in a 1949 performance of The Warsaw Ghetto
- Born: Bella Rebecca Lewitzky; January 13, 1916; Llano del Rio, California, U.S.
- Died: July 16, 2004 (aged 88); Pasadena, California, U.S.
- Spouse: Newell Reynolds (m. 1940)
- Children: Nora Reynolds Daniel

Bella Rebecca Lewitzky (January 13, 1916 – July 16, 2004) was an American modern dance choreographer, dancer and teacher.

Lewitzky was a lifelong advocate for artistic freedom in dance, and continuously pursued political and artistic objectives in her works. Throughout her over 70-year career, Lewitzky asserted her independence as an artist and a teacher, repeatedly confronting major institutions and the federal government in the process.

Lewitzky's unique technique emphasized seriousness and stability, extending to both the movements performed by her dancers and the approach she took to operating her company.

== Early life and education ==
Bella Rebecca Lewitzky was born on January 13, 1916, in Llano del Rio, California, a short-lived utopian community in the Antelope Valley led by Socialists. Her parents, Joseph and Nina (née Ossman) Lewitzky, were Russian Jewish immigrants, who joined Llano del Rio for the artistic and political benefits it provided. Llano del Rio disbanded in 1918, and the family moved back to Los Angeles, the birthplace of Bella's older sister Sarah.

In Los Angeles, the Lewitzky family struggled, and the family moved to San Bernardino when Bella was six. San Bernardino did not offer the artistic opportunities of either Llano del Rio or Los Angeles, but it was where Joseph could sustain the family. Lewitzky's childhood, marked by serious commitments to the arts, politics, and education, would inform her works throughout her career.

Lewitzky moved back to Los Angeles in her teens, briefly studying ballet with a former member of the Ballets Russes, before joining the Lester Horton company in 1934. As a student, and later an integral collaborator, of the Horton company, Lewitzky was closely involved in the development of the Horton technique. Fred Strickler, an accomplished dancer and educator who studied under Lewitzky, argued that "[Horton] built his technique, which is now known as the Horton technique, on her body. Specifically. On her body."

== Career ==
In 1946, Lewitzky was a co-founder of a unique organization in Los Angeles, the Dance Theater. The Dance Theater was one of the few institutions in the United States to house both a dance school and theater under the same roof, and was known for its progressive politics and insistence on racial integration. Lewitzky parted ways with Horton and the Dance Theater in 1950, after disagreements with Horton over technique and administration. In parting with Horton, Lewitzky had codified her own technique.

Lewitzky appeared as a specialty dancer in the 1943 Technicolor adventure film White Savage, and she choreographed the films Bagdad (1949) (with Lester Horton), Tripoli (1950), and Prehistoric Women (1950).

Lewitzky was summoned to appear before the House Un-American Activities Committee in 1951, accused of being a Communist. She refused on constitutional grounds to answer many of the committee's questions, as advised by her lawyers. Following the hearing, Lewitzky told the news media "I am a dancer, not a singer," poetically refusing to "sing" names to the committee. For this action, Lewitzky was blacklisted, preventing her from securing roles on the stage or screen. Her studio was relatively unaffected, despite the presence of numerous threatening letters and phone calls.

In 1955, Lewitzky gave birth to her only child, her daughter Nora. The same year, she moved her rehearsals to Idyllwild, California, in the San Jacinto Mountains outside of Los Angeles. In 1956, she became the founding chair of the dance department at the Idyllwild School of Music and the Arts, continuing her affiliation until 1972. Her daughter, Nora, joined the dance faculty in 2003 and continues teaching Lewitzky technique. The Idyllwild Arts Academy is one of the few dance programs in the United States that offers Lewitzky Technique as part of their curriculum.

Poster of Lewitzky company dancer Claudia Ross in Inscape (1976)

In 1966, she founded the Lewitzky Dance Company. Under her artistic guidance, the company became one of the leading international modern dance companies, performing to critical acclaim in forty-three states across the U.S. as well as twenty countries on five continents. Among her dance associates was the former television child actress Noreen Corcoran of Bachelor Father.

Lewitzky was the founder of the dance program at California Institute of the Arts (CalArts) in the late 1960s and early 1970s. In accepting the appointment, she saw an opportunity to differentiate the program from other academic dance programs, which she distrusted and generally did not interact with. Lewitzky's goal for the program was to "train dancers for every need they might have," including publicity and stage lighting. Despite her commitment to the purpose of CalArts, Lewitzky disliked being an administrator, and she resigned in early 1972.

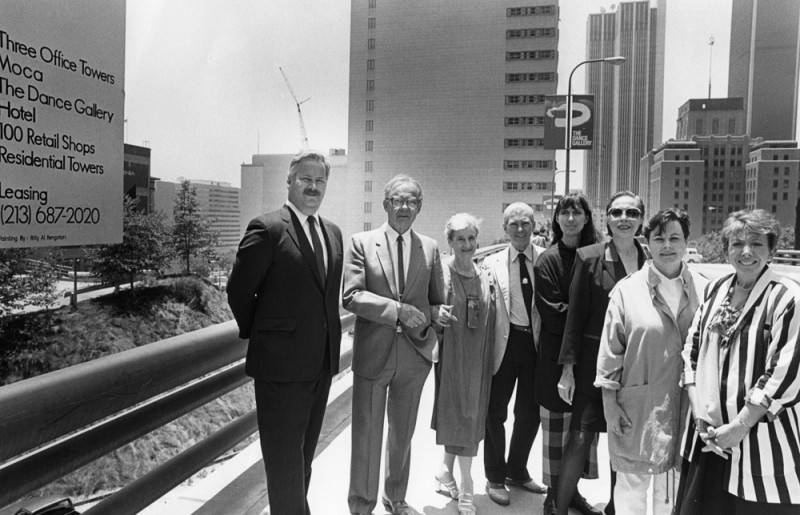
Lewitzky (third from left) at the planned site of the Dance Gallery in 1988

A major component of Lewitzky's legacy was to be the Dance Gallery, a new facility in California Plaza that would integrate studios and a 1000-seat theater. Plans for the Dance Gallery were in progress by 1978, but the project stalled, and was still unbuilt a decade later. The Colburn School took over the project in 1992, committing to constructing a building and amicably parting ways with Lewitzky and her company.

Following her activism against HUAC in the 1950s, Lewitzky continued to advocate for artistic freedom. In 1990, Lewitzky's company was awarded a $72,000 grant from the National Endowment for the Arts, which required that the company not produce obscene works. This anti-obscenity provision was imposed in 1989 on all NEA grants, in an effort led by Senator Jesse Helms. Lewitzky refused to sign the anti-obscenity provision and instead sued the NEA, arguing that the anti-obscenity provision was in violation of the First and Fifth Amendments. The case was decided in Lewitzky's favor in early 1991.

The Lewitzky Dance Company disbanded in 1997 after 30 years, with Lewitzky describing the decision to do so as "a political act, there’s no question about it." Lewitzky criticized the corporate structure and funding models that became necessary for an arts company the size of hers to survive. In closing the company, Lewitzky also condemned her funders, whom she did not name, for ending her hopes of handing off the company to her associates.

== Personal life ==
Lewitzky was married to Newell Taylor Reynolds, an architect and set designer. Lewitzky and Reynolds met while they were dancers in the Lester Horton company, and married in 1940. Reynolds designed sets for the Lewitzky Dance Company, among other collaborations. Their wedding reception was held at the Samuel Freeman House, which they frequented as part of an avant garde salon.

Lewitzky and Reynolds had one daughter, Nora Reynolds, born in 1960.

== Death and legacy ==
Lewitzky died in Pasadena, California, on July 16, 2004, of complications following a stroke.

Lewitzky's technique and works are celebrated as part of the distinctive tradition of modern dance in California. Her life and works are the subject of the 2022 documentary film Bella, directed by Bridget Murnane.

The records of the Bella Lewitzky Dance Company are held at the University of Southern California Music Library.

== Awards and honors ==
Lewitzky received many awards including honorary doctorates from California Institute of Arts (1981), Occidental College (1984), Otis Parsons College (1989), and the Juilliard School (1993). She was awarded a Guggenheim Fellowship in 1977. In 1991 she was a recipient of the Heritage Award from the National Dance Association. In 1996, she was awarded the National Medal of Arts.
