= Robert Blake (actor) =

American actor (1933–2023)

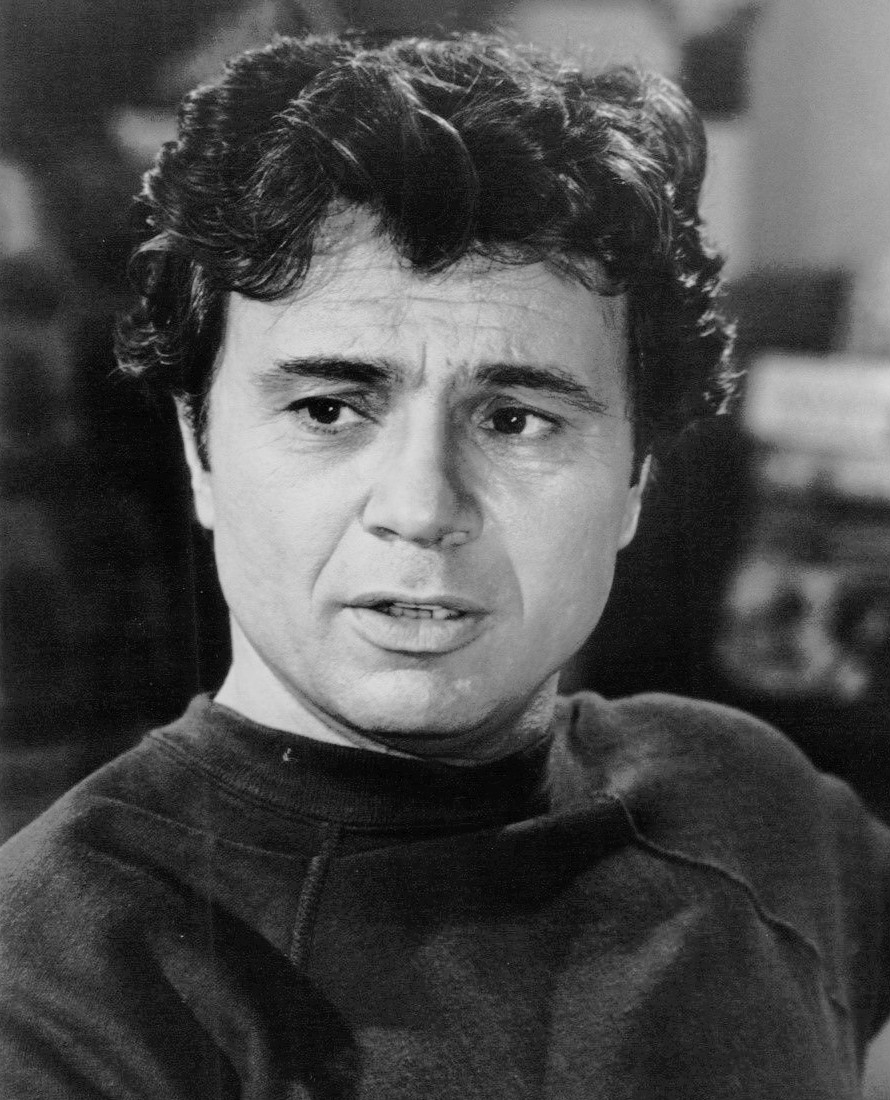
- Blake in 1977
- Born: Michael James Gubitosi; September 18, 1933; Nutley, New Jersey, U.S.
- Died: March 9, 2023 (aged 89); Los Angeles, California, U.S.
- Other names: Bobby Blake; Lyman P. Docker; Mickey Gubitosi
- Occupation: Actor
- Years active: 1939–1997
- Spouses: Sondra Kerr (m. 1961; div. 1983); Bonny Lee Bakley (m. 2000; died 2001); Pamela Hudak (m. 2017; div. 2019)
- Children: 3

Robert Blake (born Michael James Gubitosi; September 18, 1933 – March 9, 2023), billed early in his career as Mickey Gubitosi and Bobby Blake, was an American actor. He is best known today for his role as convicted killer Perry Smith in the 1967 film In Cold Blood, the title role in the 1975–78 television series Baretta (for which he received an Emmy award), and appearing as the Mystery Man in the 1997 film Lost Highway. At the time of his death, he was one of the last surviving stars of the Golden Age of Hollywood.

Blake began his career in the 1930s performing as a child singer and dancer alongside his family, but became famous for his central role as "Mickey" in the final years of the Metro-Goldwyn-Mayer-era of the Our Gang (Little Rascals) short film series from 1939 to 1944. He also appeared as juvenile sidekick "Little Beaver" in 23 entries of the Red Ryder film franchise. After a stint in the U.S. Army, Blake returned to acting in television and movies. His film credits include Pork Chop Hill (1959), The Purple Gang (1960), Town Without Pity (1961), PT 109 (1963), Tell Them Willie Boy Is Here (1969), Electra Glide in Blue (1973), Coast to Coast (1980), and Money Train (1995). He continued acting until 1997's Lost Highway. Blake was one of the small number of child actors able to evolve into mature roles as an adult. Author Michael Newton called Blake's career "one of the longest in Hollywood history".

Blake was arrested in 2002 for the 2001 murder of his second wife, Bonny Lee Bakley. He was acquitted of the murder in criminal court in 2005, but was found liable in civil court for her wrongful death.

== Early life ==
Blake was born Michael James Gubitosi in Nutley, New Jersey, on September 18, 1933. His parents were Giacomo (James) Gubitosi and his wife, Elizabeth Cafone. In 1930, James worked as a die setter for a can manufacturer. Eventually, Blake's parents began a song-and-dance act. In 1936, their three children began performing, billed as "The Three Little Hillbillies". They moved to Los Angeles, California, in 1938, where the children began working as movie extras.

Blake's parents were from Campania, Italy: his father was from the town of Montella in the province of Avellino and his mother from the town of Polla.

Blake had an unhappy childhood in which he was abused by his alcoholic father. When he entered public school at age 10, he was bullied and had fights with other students, which led to his expulsion. Blake later said he was physically and sexually abused by both his parents and was often locked in a closet and forced to eat off the floor as punishment. At age 14, he ran away from home, leading to several more difficult years. When Blake's father killed himself in 1956, Blake refused to attend the funeral.

== Child actor ==
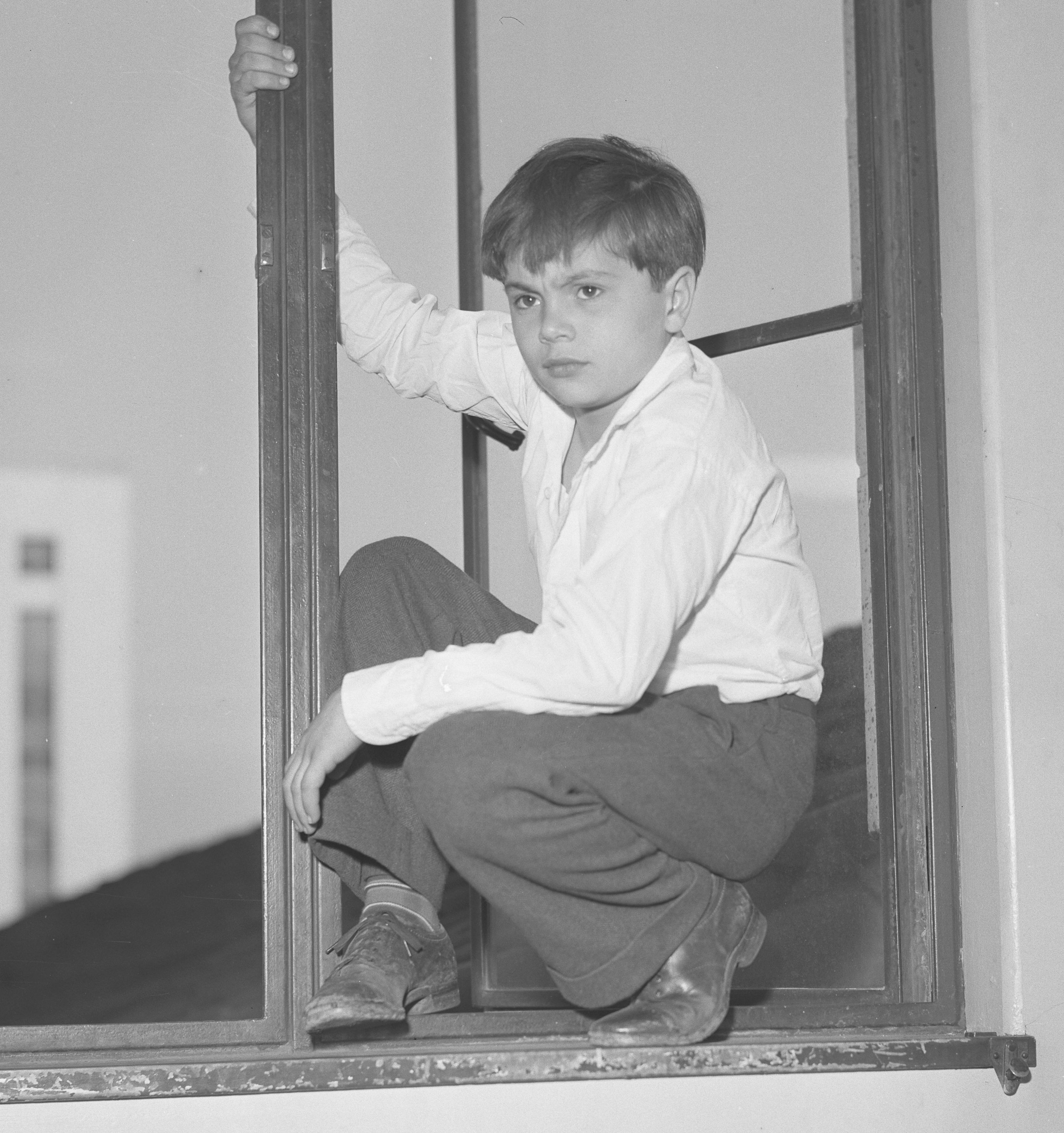
Blake in 1944

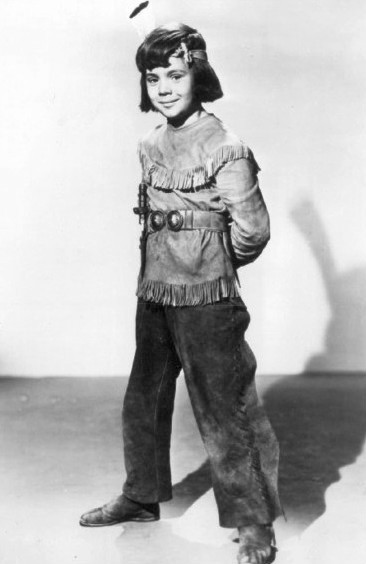
Blake as "Little Beaver" in a Red Ryder film serial chapter, ca. 1946

Then known as Mickey Gubitosi, Blake began his acting career as Toto in the MGM movie Bridal Suite (1939), starring Annabella and Robert Young. He then began appearing in MGM's Our Gang short subjects (a.k.a. The Little Rascals) under his real name, replacing Eugene "Porky" Lee. He appeared in 40 of the shorts between 1939 and 1944, eventually becoming the series' final lead character. Blake's parents also made appearances in the series as extras. In Our Gang, Blake's character, Mickey, was often called upon to cry, for which he was criticized as unconvincing. He was also criticized for being obnoxious and whiny.

In 1942, he acquired the stage name Bobby Blake and scored his first starring role in a feature film, playing the title role in the MGM feature Mokey. Donna Reed starred as Mokey's mother, and Billie "Buckwheat" Thomas, who co-starred in Our Gang alongside Blake, played Mokey's friend Brother Cumby. After Blake took his stage name, his Our Gang character was renamed "Mickey Blake". Blake also appeared as "Tooky" Stedman in the 1942 film Andy Hardy's Double Life.

In 1944, MGM discontinued Our Gang, releasing the final short in the series, Dancing Romeo. In 1995, the Young Artist Foundation honored Blake with its Former Child Star "Lifetime Achievement" Award for his role in Our Gang.

In 1944, Blake began playing a Native American boy, "Little Beaver", in the Red Ryder Western series at the studios of Republic Pictures (now CBS Radford Studios), appearing in 23 of the movies until 1947. He also had roles in one of Laurel and Hardy's films, The Big Noise (1944), and the Warner Bros. movies Humoresque (1946), playing John Garfield's character as a child, and The Treasure of the Sierra Madre (1948), playing the Mexican boy who sells Humphrey Bogart a winning lottery ticket. In 1950, at age 17, Blake appeared as Mahmoud in The Black Rose and as Enrico, Naples Bus Boy (uncredited) in Black Hand.

== Career as an adult ==
In 1950, Blake was drafted into the U.S. Army during the Korean War. Upon leaving at age 21, he found himself without job prospects and fell into a deep depression. This led to a two-year addiction to heroin and cocaine. He also sold drugs. Blake entered Jeff Corey's acting class and began working on improving his personal and professional life. He eventually became a seasoned Hollywood actor, playing notable dramatic roles in movies and on television. In 1956, he was billed as Robert Blake for the first time.

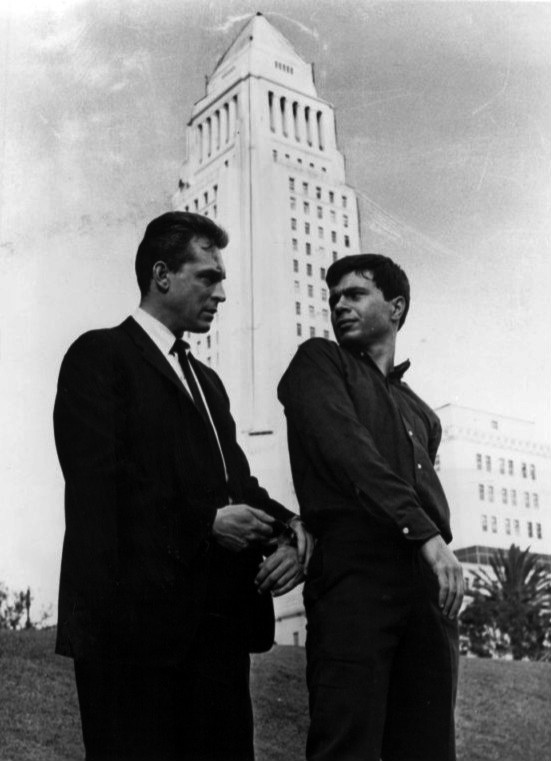
Paul Burke and Blake in Naked City (1961)

In 1959, Blake turned down the role of Little Joe Cartwright, a character ultimately portrayed by Michael Landon, in NBC's Western television series Bonanza. He did appear that year as Tobe Hackett in the episode "Trade Me Deadly" of the syndicated Western series 26 Men, which dramatized true stories of the Arizona Rangers. Blake also appeared twice as "Alfredo" in the syndicated Western The Cisco Kid and starred in "The White Hat" episode of Men of Annapolis, another syndicated series. He appeared in three distinctive guest lead roles in the CBS series Have Gun Will Travel, as well as one-time guest roles on John Payne's NBC Western The Restless Gun, Nick Adams's ABC Western The Rebel, and in season 3, episode 25 of Bat Masterson, the NBC Western series The Californians, the short-lived ABC adventure series Straightaway, and the NBC Western television series Laramie.

Blake performed in numerous motion pictures as an adult, including the starring role in The Purple Gang (1960), a gangster movie, and featured roles in Pork Chop Hill (1959) and, as one of four U.S. soldiers participating in a gang rape in occupied Germany, in Town Without Pity (1961). He appeared in the John F. Kennedy war biopic PT 109 as Charles "Bucky" Harris (1963). He was also in Ensign Pulver (1964), The Greatest Story Ever Told (1965), and other films. Blake garnered further exposure as a member of the ensemble cast of the 1963 acclaimed but short-lived The Richard Boone Show, appearing in 15 of its 25 episodes.

Boone introduced Blake to entertainment attorney Louis L. Goldman, whom Blake credited with putting him on a successful career path:

Lou was Cus D'Amato. He took me under his wing. He said, "Robert, you have to listen to me. Otherwise you're never going to make it." And somehow he had the emotional and the psychological wherewithal to get me to respect and love him. And he kept me out of the courtrooms. Many's the time he went back in the judge's chambers and drug me back there and solved the problem that was going to turn into a nightmare. [He'd] [c]ome on the set and handle things; once [he went] to Lew Wasserman's office and said, "Don't worry, I'll handle it, I'll fix it"... For some reason or other, I listened to him. When I was with him I was like a little boy. And I would apologize. I'd say "God, Lou, I'm sorry." He had a way of getting to your heart so that the junkyard dog was not there with him. And he took care of all of us in that way. I was very lucky.

In 1967, Blake had a career breakthrough with the film In Cold Blood. He played real-life murderer Perry Smith, whom he physically resembled. Richard Brooks received two Oscar nominations for the film: one for his direction, and one for his adaptation of Truman Capote's book. With In Cold Blood, Blake was the first actor to utter the expletive "bullshit" in a mainstream American motion picture.

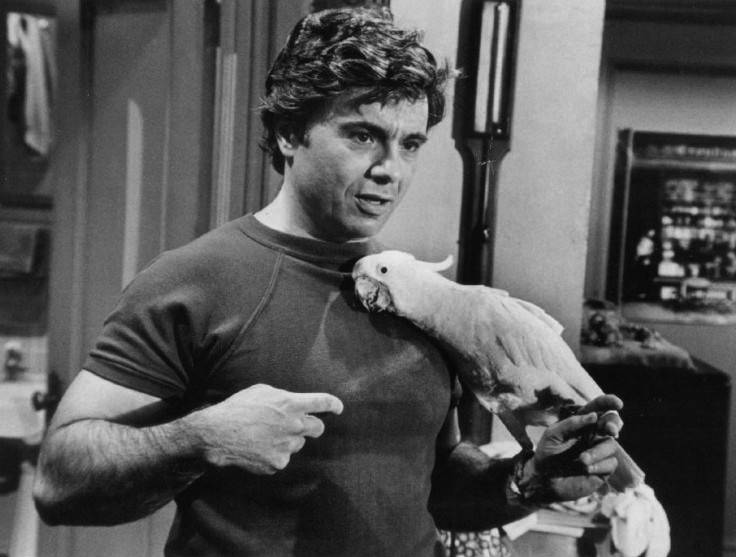
As Baretta with Fred, 1976

Blake played a Native American fugitive in Tell Them Willie Boy Is Here (1969), starred in a TV movie adaptation of Of Mice and Men (1981), and played a motorcycle highway patrolman in Electra Glide in Blue (1973). He played a small-town stock car driver with ambitions to join the NASCAR circuit in Corky, which MGM produced in 1972. The film featured real NASCAR drivers, including Richard Petty and Cale Yarborough as themselves.

Blake may be best known for his Emmy Award–winning role of Tony Baretta in the popular television series Baretta (1975–78), playing a streetwise plainclothes police detective. The show's trademarks included Baretta's pet cockatoo "Fred" and his signature phrases—notably "That's the name of that tune", and "You can take that to the bank."

After Baretta ended, NBC offered to produce several pilot episodes of a proposed series titled Joe Dancer, in which Blake would play the role of a hard-boiled private detective. In addition to starring, Blake also was credited as the executive producer and creator. Three television films aired on NBC in 1981 and 1983, but a "Joe Dancer" TV series never materialized.

Blake had starring roles in a couple of films for Paramount Pictures, Coast to Coast (1980) and Second-Hand Hearts (1981). He continued to act through the 1980s and 1990s, mostly in television, in such roles as Jimmy Hoffa in the miniseries Blood Feud (1983) and John List in the murder drama Judgment Day: The John List Story (1993), which earned him a third Emmy nomination. Blake starred in the 1985 television series Hell Town, playing a priest working in a tough neighborhood, and wrote the screenplay for the pilot as Lyman P. Docker. He also had character parts in the theatrical movies Money Train (1995) and played the Mystery Man in David Lynch's Lost Highway (1997), his last film role.

== Marriages and children ==
Blake and actress Sondra Kerr were married in 1961 and divorced in 1983. It was his first marriage, from which came two children: actor Noah Blake (born 1965) and Delinah Blake (born 1966).

In 1999, eight years after his attorney Louis L. Goldman's death, Blake met Bonny Lee Bakley, formerly of Wharton, New Jersey, who had already been married nine times and reportedly had a history of exploiting older men, especially celebrities, for money. She was dating Christian Brando, the son of Marlon Brando, during her relationship with Blake. Bakley became pregnant and told both Brando and Blake that her baby was theirs. Initially, Bakley named the baby "Christian Shannon Brando" and said Brando was the father. Bakley wrote Blake letters describing her dubious motives. Blake insisted that she take a DNA test to prove paternity. He became Bakley's tenth husband on November 19, 2000, after DNA tests proved that Blake was the biological father of Bakley's youngest child. After paternity was established, the child's name was legally changed to Rose Lenore Sophia Blake; after the murder, the child was designated to be raised by Blake's daughter, Delinah. Blake remained married to Bakley until she was murdered on May 4, 2001.

In a March 2016 interview at age 82, Blake said he had a new woman in his life, who remained unnamed. In 2017, Blake applied for a marriage license for his fiancée, Pamela Hudak, an event planner whom he had known for decades and who had testified on his behalf at his trial. On December 7, 2018, it was announced that Blake had filed for divorce.

== Murder of Bonny Lee Bakley ==
On May 4, 2001, Blake took Bakley out for dinner at Vitello's Italian Restaurant in Studio City, California. Bakley was fatally shot in the head while sitting in Blake's vehicle, which was parked on a side street around the corner from the restaurant. Blake said he had returned to the restaurant to collect a pistol he had left there and had not been present when the shooting took place. The pistol Blake left in the restaurant was found and determined by police not to be the murder weapon.

=== Arrest ===
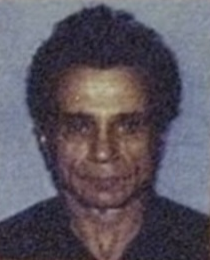
Blake's 2002 mug shot

On April 18, 2002, Blake was arrested and charged with Bakley's murder. His longtime bodyguard, Earle Caldwell, was also arrested and charged with conspiracy in connection with the murder. A key event that gave the Los Angeles Police Department the confidence to arrest Blake came when a retired stuntman, Ronald Hambleton, agreed to testify against him. Hambleton said that Blake tried to hire him to kill Bakley. Another retired stuntman and an associate of Hambleton's, Gary McLarty, came forward with a similar story. According to author Miles Corwin, Hambleton agreed to testify against Blake only after being told that he would be subject to a grand jury subpoena and a misdemeanor charge.

On April 22, 2002, Blake was charged with one count of murder with special circumstances, an offense that carried a possible death penalty. He was also charged with two counts of solicitation of murder and one count of conspiracy to commit murder. Blake pleaded not guilty. On March 13, 2003, after almost a year in jail, Blake was granted bail, which was set at $1.5 million. He was then placed under house arrest while awaiting trial. On October 31, in a major reversal for the prosecution, the judge dismissed the conspiracy charges against Blake and Caldwell during a pre-trial hearing. The junior prosecutor who handled the case, Shellie Samuels, was interviewed by CBS reporter Peter Van Sant for the CBS program 48 Hours Investigates. During the interview, broadcast in November 2003, she admitted that the prosecutors had no forensic evidence implicating Blake in the murder and that they could not tie him to the murder weapon.

=== Trial and acquittal ===
Blake's criminal trial for murder began on December 20, 2004, with opening statements by the prosecution. The defense gave its opening statements the next day. The prosecution contended that Blake intentionally murdered Bakley to free himself from a loveless marriage, while the defense claimed that Blake was an innocent victim of circumstantial and fabricated evidence. McLarty and Hambleton each testified that Blake had asked them to murder Bakley. On cross-examination, the defense brought up McLarty's mental health problems and Hambleton's criminal history. The lack of gunshot residue on Blake's hands was a key part of the defense's case that Blake was not the shooter. Blake chose not to testify.

On March 16, 2005, Blake was found not guilty of murder and not guilty of one of the two counts of solicitation of murder. The other count, for solicitation to commit murder, was dropped after it was revealed that the jury was deadlocked 11–1 in favor of acquittal. Los Angeles County District Attorney Stephen Cooley, commenting on this ruling, called Blake "a miserable human being" and the jurors "incredibly stupid" to fall for the defense's claims. Public opinion about the verdict was mixed, with some believing Blake guilty but many feeling that there was insufficient evidence to convict him. On the night of his acquittal several fans celebrated at Blake's favorite haunt—Vitello's, the scene of the crime.

=== Civil case ===
Bakley's three children filed a civil suit against Blake, asserting that he was responsible for their mother's death. During the trial, the girlfriend of Blake's co-defendant Earle Caldwell said she believed Blake and Caldwell were involved in the crime. On November 18, 2005, a jury found Blake liable for the wrongful death of his wife and ordered him to pay $30 million. On February 3, 2006, Blake filed for bankruptcy. Blake's attorney, M. Gerald Schwartzbach, appealed the court's decision on February 28, 2007. On April 26, 2008, an appeals court upheld the civil case verdict, but cut Blake's penalty to $15 million.

=== Aftermath ===
Blake maintained a low profile after his acquittal and filing for bankruptcy, with debts of $3 million for unpaid legal fees as well as state and federal taxes. On April 9, 2010, the state of California filed a tax lien against him for $1.1 million in unpaid back taxes.

On July 16, 2012, Blake was interviewed on CNN's Piers Morgan Tonight. When asked about the night of Bakley's murder, he became defensive and angry, saying he resented the questions and felt he was being interrogated. Morgan said he was only asking questions he felt people were eager to have answered.

In January 2019, Blake was interviewed by 20/20. Initially, he seemed to decline the interview and instead delegated it to a friend, but then he began to participate, discussing the murder and the behavior of the police officers who dealt with him, the culture of Hollywood and its reaction to the event, and his early life and difficulties with his parents.

In September 2019, Blake started a YouTube channel titled "Robert Blake: I ain't dead yet, so stay tuned", on which he discussed his life and career.

In October 2019, Blake's daughter Rose Lenore opened up about her childhood and how the trial affected her. She discussed reuniting with her father, visiting her mother's grave, and her own desire to get into acting. She disclaimed knowledge of the truth about her mother's murder and said she was open to learning the truth "if it's ever an option".

In 2021, Blake started a website, "Robert Blake's Pushcart", where scripts, memorabilia, and books including his autobiography Tales of a Rascal are available to read and in the case of the latter can be ordered.

Quentin Tarantino's novel Once Upon a Time in Hollywood, based on his film of the same name, is dedicated to Blake. Brad Pitt's character in the film, Cliff Booth, is also accused of murdering his wife.

== Death ==
Blake died from heart disease in Los Angeles on March 9, 2023, aged 89.

At the 95th Academy Awards on March 12, 2023, host Jimmy Kimmel said, "Everybody please get out your phones, even at home. It's time to vote. If you think Robert Blake should be part of the In Memoriam montage, text 'GIMME-A-Blake' to the number on your screen, or to any number." Blake was not included in the "In Memoriam" montage or in the Academy's official newsletter. His son Noah criticized the omission of his father's name and career. Blake was also left out of the "In Memoriam" montage at the 75th Primetime Emmy Awards, but was included in the full list of the names featured on the Television Academy's website. Blake was featured in the 2023 "TCM Remembers" montage, an annual tribute to the film industry's deceased by Turner Classic Movies.

== Filmography ==
=== Feature films ===
Year	Title	Role	Notes	Ref.
1939	Bridal Suite	Toto	Uncredited	
1940	I Love You Again	Edward Littlejohn Jr.	Uncredited	
1942	Mokey	Daniel "Mokey" Delano	Credited as 'Bobby Blake'	
1942	Kid Glove Killer	Boy in Car	Uncredited	
1942	Andy Hardy's Double Life	"Tooky" Stedman		
1942	China Girl	Chandu		
1943	Slightly Dangerous	Boy on Porch	Uncredited	
1943	Salute to the Marines	Junior Carson	Uncredited	
1943	Lost Angel	Jerry		
1944	Tucson Raiders	Little Beaver		
1944	Meet the People	Jimmy Smith	Uncredited	
1944	Marshal of Reno	Little Beaver		
1944	The Seventh Cross	Small Boy	Uncredited	
1944	The San Antonio Kid	Little Beaver		
1944	The Big Noise	Egbert Hartley		
1944	Cheyenne Wildcat	Little Beaver		
1944	The Woman in the Window	Dickie Wanley	Uncredited	
1944	Vigilantes of Dodge City	Little Beaver		
1944	Sheriff of Las Vegas	Little Beaver		
1945	Great Stagecoach Robbery	Little Beaver		
1945	Pillow to Post	Wilbur		
1945	The Horn Blows at Midnight	Junior Poplinski		
1945	Lone Texas Ranger	Little Beaver		
1945	Phantom of the Plains	Little Beaver		
1945	Marshal of Laredo	Little Beaver		
1945	Colorado Pioneers	Little Beaver		
1945	Dakota	Little Boy		
1945	Wagon Wheels Westward	Little Beaver		
1946	A Guy Could Change	Alan Schroeder		
1946	California Gold Rush	Little Beaver		
1946	Sheriff of Redwood Valley	Little Beaver		
1946	Home on the Range	Cub Garth		
1946	Sun Valley Cyclone	Little Beaver		
1946	In Old Sacramento	Newsboy		
1946	Conquest of Cheyenne	Little Beaver		
1946	Santa Fe Uprising	Little Beaver		
1946	Out California Way	Danny McCoy		
1946	Stagecoach to Denver	Little Beaver		
1946	Humoresque	Paul Boray as a Child		
1947	Vigilantes of Boomtown	Little Beaver		
1947	Homesteaders of Paradise Valley	Little Beaver		
1947	Oregon Trail Scouts	Little Beaver		
1947	Rustlers of Devil's Canyon	Little Beaver		
1947	Marshal of Cripple Creek	Little Beaver		
1947	The Return of Rin Tin Tin	Paul the Refugee Lad		
1947	The Last Round-up	Mike Henry		
1948	The Treasure of the Sierra Madre	Mexican Boy Selling Lottery Tickets	Uncredited	
1950	Black Hand	Enrico	Uncredited	
1950	The Black Rose	Mahmoud		
1952	Apache War Smoke	Luis Herrera		
1953	Treasure of the Golden Condor	Stable Boy	Uncredited	
1953	The Veils of Bagdad	Beggar Boy		
1956	Screaming Eagles	Pvt. Hernandez		
1956	The Rack	Italian Soldier	Uncredited	
1956	Rumble on the Docks	Chuck		
1957	Three Violent People	Rafael Ortega		
1957	The Tijuana Story	Enrique Acosta Mesa		
1958	The Beast of Budapest	Karolyi		
1958	Revolt in the Big House	Rudy Hernandez		
1959	Pork Chop Hill	Pvt. Velie		
1959	Battle Flame	Cpl. Jake Pacheco		
1959	The Purple Gang	William Joseph "Honeyboy" Willard		
1961	Town Without Pity	Corporal Jim Larkin		
1963	PT 109	Charles "Bucky" Harris		
1965	The Greatest Story Ever Told	Simon the Zealot		
1966	This Property Is Condemned	Sidney		
1967	In Cold Blood	Perry Smith		
1969	Tell Them Willie Boy Is Here	Willie Boy		
1972	Ripped Off	Teddy "Cherokee" Wilson		
1972	Corky	Corky		
1973	Electra Glide in Blue	Officer John Wintergreen		
1974	Busting	Farrell		
1980	Coast to Coast	Charles Callahan		
1981	Second-Hand Hearts	Loyal Muke		
1995	Money Train	Donald Patterson		
1997	Lost Highway	The Mystery Man	Final film role	

=== Short film ===
Year	Film	Role	Notes	Ref.
1939	Joy Scouts	Mickey	Credited as 'Mickey Gubitosi'	
1939	Auto Antics	Mickey	Credited as 'Mickey Gubitosi'	
1939	Captain Spanky's Showboat	Mickey	Credited as 'Mickey Gubitosi'	
1939	Dad for a Day	Mickey		
1939	Time Out for Lessons	Mickey	Credited as 'Mickey Gubitosi'	
1940	Alfalfa's Double	Mickey	Credited as 'Mickey Gubitosi'	
1940	The Big Premiere	Mickey	Credited as 'Mickey Gubitosi'	
1940	All About Hash	Mickey	Credited as 'Mickey Gubitosi'	
1940	The New Pupil	Mickey	Credited as 'Mickey Gubitosi'	
1940	Spots Before Your Eyes	Kid	Credited as 'Mickey Gubitosi'	
1940	Bubbling Troubles	Mickey	Credited as 'Mickey Gubitosi'	
1940	Good Bad Boys	Mickey	Credited as 'Mickey Gubitosi'	
1940	Waldo's Last Stand	Mickey	Credited as 'Mickey Gubitosi'	
1940	Goin' Fishin'	Mickey	Credited as 'Mickey Gubitosi'	
1940	Kiddie Kure	Mickey	Credited as 'Mickey Gubitosi'	
1941	Fightin' Fools	Mickey	Credited as 'Mickey Gubitosi'	
1941	Baby Blues	Mickey	Credited as 'Mickey Gubitosi'	
1941	Ye Olde Minstrels	Mickey	Credited as 'Mickey Gubitosi'	
1941	1-2-3 Go	Mickey	Credited as 'Mickey Gubitosi'	
1941	Robot Wrecks	Mickey	Credited as 'Mickey Gubitosi'	
1941	Helping Hands	Mickey	Credited as 'Mickey Gubitosi'	
1941	Come Back, Miss Pipps	Mickey	Credited as 'Mickey Gubitosi'	
1941	Wedding Worries	Mickey	Credited as 'Mickey Gubitosi'	
1941	Main Street on the March!	Schulte Child	Uncredited	
1942	Melodies Old and New	Mickey	Credited as 'Mickey Gubitosi'	
1942	Going to Press	Mickey	Credited as 'Mickey Gubitosi'	
1942	Don't Lie	Mickey	Credited as 'Mickey Gubitosi'	
1942	Surprised Parties	Mickey	Credited as 'Mickey Gubitosi'	
1942	Doin' Their Bit	Mickey	Uncredited	
1942	Rover's Big Chance	Mickey		
1942	Mighty Lak a Goat	Mickey		
1942	Unexpected Riches	Mickey		
1943	Benjamin Franklin, Jr.	Mickey		
1943	Family Troubles	Mickey		
1943	Calling All Kids	Mickey		
1943	Farm Hands	Mickey		
1943	Election Daze	Mickey		
1943	Little Miss Pinkerton	Mickey		
1943	Three Smart Guys	Mickey		
1944	Radio Bugs	Mickey		
1944	Tale of a Dog	Mickey		
1944	Dancing Romeo	Mickey		

=== Television ===
Year	Film	Role	Notes	Ref.
1952	The Adventures of Wild Bill Hickok	Rain Cloud	Episode: "The Professor's Daughter"	
1953	Fireside Theatre	Johnny	Episode: "Night in the Warehouse"	
1953	The Cisco Kid	Davy / Alfredo	2 episodes	
1956	The Roy Rogers Show		Episode: "Paleface Justice"	
1956–58	Broken Arrow	Various	3 episodes	
1957	Official Detective	Al Madsen	Episode: "The Hostages"	
1957	Men of Annapolis	Ed	Episode: "The White Hat"	
1957	26 Men	Tobe Hackett	Episode: "Trade Me Deadly"	
1957	Whirlybirds	Jose	Episode: "The Runaway"	
1957	The Court of Last Resort	Tomas Mendoza	Episode: "The Tomas Mendoza Case"	
1958	The Millionaire	Clark Davis	Episode: "The John Richards Story"	
1958	The Restless Gun	Lupe Sandoval	Episode: "Thunder Valley"	
1958	The Californians	Cass	Episode: "The Long Night"	
1959	Black Saddle	Wayne Robinson	Episode: "Client: Robinson"	
1959	Playhouse 90	Unknown character	Episode: "A Trip to Paradise"	
1959	Dick Powell's Zane Grey Theatre	CSA Cpl. Michael Bers	Episode: "Heritage"	
1960	The Rebel	Virgil Moss	Episode: "He's Only a Boy"	
1960	Alcoa Presents: One Step Beyond	Tom	Episode: "Gyspy"	
1960–62	Have Gun - Will Travel	Various	3 episodes	
1961	Bat Masterson	Bill-Bill MacWilliams	Episode: "No Amnesty for Death"	
1961	Wagon Train	Johnny Kamen	Episode: "The Joe Muharich Story"	
1961	Naked City	Knox Maquon	2 episodes	
1961	Laramie	Lame Wolf	Episode: "Wolf Club"	
1961–62	Straightaway	Chu Chu	2 episodes	
1962	Ben Casey	Jesse Verdugo	Episode: "Imagine a Long Bright Corridor"	
1962	Cain's Hundred	Rick Carter	Episode: "A Creature Lurks in Ambush"	
1962	The New Breed	Bobby Madero	Episode: "My Brother's Keeper"	
1963–64	The Richard Boone Show	Various	14 episodes	
1965	Slattery's People	Jerry Leon	Episode: "Question: Does Nero Still at Ringside Sit?"	
1965	The Trials of O'Brien	Joe Rooney	Episode: "Bargain Day on the Street of Regret"	
1965	Rawhide	Max Gufler / Hap Johnson	2 episodes	
1965–66	The F.B.I.	Junior / Pete Cloud	2 episodes	
1966	Twelve O'Clock High	Lt. Johnny Eagle	Episode: "A Distant Cry"	
1966	Death Valley Days	Billy the Kid	Episode: "The Kid from Hell's Kitchen"	
1975–78	Baretta	Detective Anthony Vincenzo "Tony" Baretta	82 episodes	
1977	29th Primetime Emmy Awards	Himself (Co-Host)	With Angie Dickinson	
1981	The Big Black Pill	Joe Dancer	Television film	
1981	The Monkey Mission	Joe Dancer	Television film	
1981	Of Mice and Men	George Milton	Television film	
1982	Saturday Night Live	Himself (Host)	Episode: "Robert Blake/Kenny Loggins"	
1983	Blood Feud	Jimmy Hoffa	Miniseries	
1983	Murder 1, Dancer 0	Joe Dancer	Television film	
1985	Hell Town	Noah "Hardstep" Rivers	13 episodes	
1985	Heart of a Champion: The Ray Mancini Story	Lenny Mancini	Television film	
1993	Judgment Day: The John List Story	John List	Television film	
