= Leonard Landy =

American actor (1933–2017)

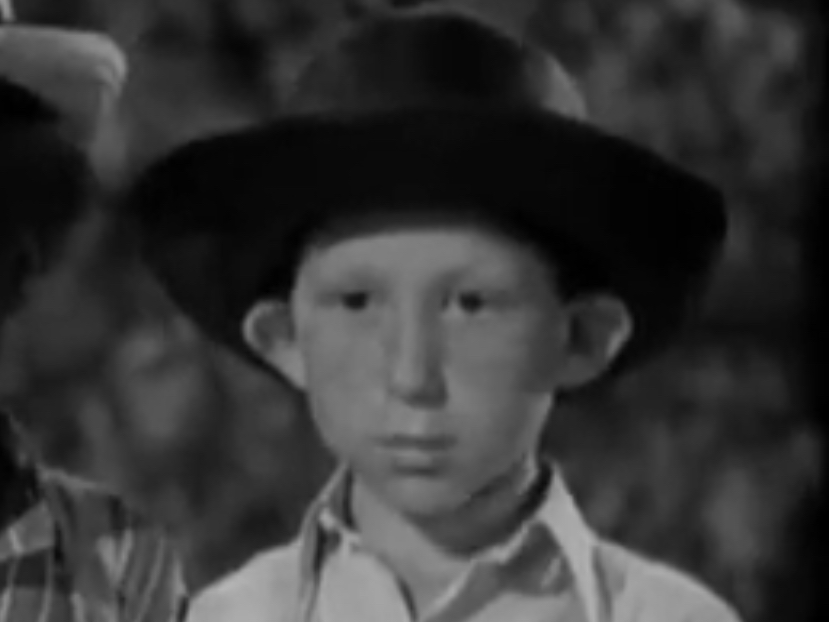
- Leonard Landy in Waldo's Last Stand (1940)
- Born: July 3, 1933; California, US
- Died: July 26, 2017 (aged 84); Palm Desert, California, United States
- Occupation: Child actor
- Years active: 1938–1941

Leonard Jerome Landy (July 3, 1933 – July 26, 2017) was an American child actor. He appeared in the Our Gang comedies from 1938 until 1941, in which he went by the names of Percy, Phooey, Deacon, and Leonard.

== Our Gang ==
Landy joined Our Gang in 1938, around the end of the Hal Roach era. Landy first appeared in the short Feed 'em and Weep. He was first named Percy. However, he was known as Deacon for a while, and Phooey once until finally settling on his real name, Leonard. The character played by Landy was known for having big ears and freckles. He last appeared in Fightin' Fools.

== After Our Gang ==
After Our Gang, his life remained a mystery for a while. He showed up to the 1980 Our Gang reunion which was originally going to be organised by Darla Hood. He was one of the last living rascals.

== Death ==
In 2017, Landy died. He was one of the last living rascals. He was outlived by his wife and two children.
