= Scott (given name) =

- Gender: male
- Language: English

Origin
- Language: Scottish Gaelic
- Origin: Scott (surname)
- Region of origin: Scotland

Other names
- Variant form: Scot
- Pet names: Scottie; Scotty; Scoot

Scott is a male name of Scottish origin.

Notable people and fictional characters with the name include:

== People ==
=== A–G ===
- Scott Adams (1957–2026), American author and cartoonist
- Scott Adelson (born 1961), American business executive
- Scott Adkins (born 1976), English actor
- Scott Adsit (born 1965), American actor, comedian, and writer
- Scott Aldred (born 1968), American baseball player
- Scott Alexander (disambiguation), multiple people
- Scott Ambush (born 1970), American musician
- Scott Amedure (1963–1995), American murder victim
- Scott Angelle (born 1961), interim lieutenant governor of Louisiana
- Scott Antol (born 1971), American professional wrestler
- Scott Apel (fl. 1970s–2000s), American author and media critic
- Scott Armstrong (wrestler) (born 1959), American wrestler and referee
- Scott Aukerman (born 1970), American writer, actor, comedian, television personality, director, producer, and podcast host
- Scott Bain (born 1991), Scottish footballer
- Scott Baio (born 1960), American actor and television director
- Scott Bakula (born 1954), American television actor
- Scott Banister (born 1975), American entrepreneur, startup founder, and angel investor
- Scott Barlow (baseball) (born 1992), American baseball player
- Scott Barlow (businessman) (born 1976), Australian businessman
- Scott Beigel (1982–2018), geography teacher, cross country coach, and one of the 17 victims who was killed in the Stoneman Douglas High School shooting
- Scott Bennett, several people
- Scott Benton (politician) (born 1987), British politician
- Scott Bessent (born 1962), United States Secretary of the Treasury
- Scott Bloom (born 1973), American actor, and film producer
- Scott Braddock (fl. 1980s–2000s), American retired professional wrestler
- Scott Brison (born 1967), Canadian politician
- Scott Brown (disambiguation), multiple people
- Scott Brownlee (born 1969), New Zealand rower
- Scott Budnick (soccer) (born 1971), retired American soccer player
- Scott Budnick (film producer) (fl. 1990s–2020s), American film producer
- Scott Burcham (born 1993), American-Israeli baseball player
- Scott Burns (disambiguation), multiple people
- Scott Burnside (born 1963), Canadian journalist and sportswriter
- Scott Caan (born 1976), American actor
- Scott Casey (born 1947), American retired professional wrestler
- Scott Cassell (born 1962), American explorer and underwater filmmaker
- Scott Cassidy (born 1975), American baseball player
- Scott Cawthon (fl. 1990s–2020s), American video game designer and animator
- Scott Cleland (fl. 1980s–2010s), American researcher and analyst
- Scott Clifton (born 1984), American actor and video blogger
- Scott Coffey (born 1964), American actor, director, producer and screenwriter
- Scott Colton (born 1980), American wrestler
- Scott Coker (born 1962), American mixed martial artist
- Scott Colomby (born 1952), American film, television, and stage actor
- Scott Cormode, American theologian
- Scott William Cox (born 1963), American suspected serial killer
- Scott Cranham (born 1954), Canadian diver
- Scott Crumpecker, American politician
- Scott Curtis (American football) (born 1964), American football linebacker
- Scott Curtis (FBI agent) (fl. 1980s–2020s), American FBI special agent
- Scott Daly (born 1994), American football player
- Scott D'Amore (born 1974), Canadian retired professional wrestler, manager, promoter, booker and entrepreneur
- Scott Deibert (born 1970), Canadian football player
- Scott DeMarois, American politician
- Scott Derrickson (born 1966), American filmmaker
- Scott DiMauro, American politician
- Scott Disick (born 1983), American media personality and socialite
- Scott Dixon (born 1980), Indycar driver
- Scott Dyleski (born 1988), American murderer
- Scott Eastwood (born 1986), American actor
- Scott Effross (born 1993), American baseball pitcher
- Scott Elarton (born 1976), retired American baseball player
- Scott Ellsworth (born 1927), American radio personality, news presenter, and actor
- Scott Emerson (baseball), American baseball coach
- Scott Erskine (1962–2020), American serial killer
- Scott Fellows (born 1965), American television writer and producer
- Scott Fitterer (born 1973), American football executive
- Scott Flemming (born 1958), American basketball coach
- Scott Flinders (born 1986), English professional footballer
- Scott Foley (born 1972), American actor
- Scott Forstall (born 1969), American software engineer
- Scott Foundas (born c. 1979), American film critic and studio executive
- Scott Frankel (born 1963), American composer
- Scott Galloway (soccer) (born 1995), Australian soccer player
- Scott Garson (born 1976), American college basketball coach
- Scott Gaudi (born 1974), American astronomer, exoplanet hunter, and astropolitician
- Scott Glasgow (born c. 1976), Hollywood-based musical composer
- Scott Glenn (born c. 1938 or 1942), American actor
- Scott Goldblatt (born 1979), American swimmer
- Scott Griekspoor (born 1991), Dutch tennis player
- Scott Grimes (born 1971), American actor
- Scott Guy, (died 2010), New Zealand murder victim

=== H–M ===
- Scott Halberstadt (born 1976), American actor
- Scott Hall (1958–2022), American professional wrestler
- Scott Hanson (born 1971), host of NFL RedZone
- Scott Harding (born 1986), Australian football player
- Scott Hartnell (born 1982), Canadian hockey player
- Scott Hastings (disambiguation), multiple people
- Scott B. Hayashi (born 1953), American eleventh and current bishop of the Episcopal Diocese of Utah
- Scott Helman (born 1995), Canadian singer-songwriter
- Scott Hileman (fl. 1990s–2000s), retired American soccer player
- Scott Hilton (American football) (born 1954), American football player
- Scott Hilton (politician) (born 1979), member of the Georgia House of Representatives
- Scott Hoying (born 1991), American singer-songwriter and actor
- Scott Huckabay (fl. 1990s–2020s), American musician
- Scott Hylands (born 1943), Canadian actor
- Scott Inman (born 1978), American attorney, banker, and former Democratic politician
- Scott Innes (born 1966), American voice actor, country music singer
- Scott Irwin (1952–1987), American professional wrestler
- Scott Israel (born 1956/57), American Police Chief of Opa-locka, former Sheriff of Broward County
- Scott Jaffe (born 1969), American freestyle swimmer
- Scott James (disambiguation)
- Scott Johnson (cartoonist) (born 1969), American cartoonist and podcaster
- Scott Joplin (1868–1917), American ragtime composer
- Scott Jorgensen (born 1982), American retired mixed martial artist
- Scott Kashket (born 1996), English striker for Wycombe Wanderers
- Scott Kazmir (born 1984), American baseball player
- Scott Kay (born 1989), English footballer
- Scott Kehoe (born 1964), American football player
- Scott Kellar (born 1963), American football player
- Scott Kelly (disambiguation), several people
- Scott Kenemore (born 1977), American novelist and satirist
- Scott Kennedy (comedian) (1965–2013), American stand-up comedian
- Scott Lee Kimball (born 1966), American convicted serial killer, con man, and fraudster
- Scott Kirby (born 1967), American airline executive
- Scott Kingery (born 1994), American baseball player
- Scott Koskie (born 1971), Canadian volleyball player
- Scott Kraft (fl. 1980s–2020s), American television writer and executive producer
- Scott Kriens (fl. 1970s–2010s), American chairman and former CEO of Juniper Networks
- Scott Kurtz (born 1971), American cartoonist
- Scott Kyle (born 1983), Scottish actor
- Scott LaFaro (1936–1961), American jazz double bassist
- Scott Laird (born 1988), English professional footballer
- Scott Levy (born 1964), American wrestler better known as Raven
- Scott Laughton (born 1994), Canadian ice hockey player
- Scott Lautanen (fl. 1990s–2010s), American television director and producer
- Scott Leitch (born 1969), Scottish football player
- Scott Lipsky (born 1981), American tennis player
- Scott Lockwood (born 1968), American football player
- Scott Lost, (born 1980), American retired professional wrestler
- Scott Machado (born 1990), basketball player in the Israeli Basketball Premier League
- Scott MacIntyre (born 1985), American singer
- Scott Manley (born 1972), Scottish astrophysicist
- Scott Martin (disambiguation), multiple people
- Scott Maslen (born 1971), British actor
- Scott Masters (1934?–2020), American gay pornographic film director and studio owner
- Scott Matlock (born 2000), American football player
- Scott Matthews (born 1976), English singer-songwriter
- Scott McCaughey (fl. 1970s–2020s), American singer, guitarist and songwriter
- Scott McClanahan (fl. 2000s–2020s), American writer
- Scott McCord (fl. 1990s–2020s), Canadian actor
- Scott McGregor (disambiguation), multiple people
- Scott McKean (born 1968), United States Army lieutenant general
- Scott McKenzie (1939–2012), American singer
- Scott McLaughlin (born 1993), New Zealand racing driver
- Scott McNeil (fl. 1990s–2020s), Canadian voice actor
- Scott McTominay (born 1996), Scottish footballer
- Scott Mead (fl. 1970s–2020s), American fine art photographer
- Scott Meenagh (born 1989), British Nordic skier
- Scott Menville (fl. 1980s–2020s), American voice actor
- Scott Mersereau (born 1965), American former defensive lineman
- Scott Mescudi (born 1984), American rapper
- Scott Moir (born 1987), Canadian figure skater
- Scott Moore (disambiguation), multiple people
- Scott Morrison (born 1968), Australian politician, 30th prime minister of Australia
- Scott Morrison (disambiguation), multiple people
- Scott Mosher (born 1973), Canadian field hockey player
- Scott Mosier (born 1971), American film producer, editor and actor
- Scott Muirhead (born 1984), Scottish football player
- Scott Miller (disambiguation), multiple people
- Scott Mills (born 1973), British DJ, TV presenter and actor

=== N–Z ===
- Scott Nelson (born 1969), New Zealand race walker
- Scott Neri (born 1972), Mexican painter and poet
- Scott Neslin (fl. 1970s–2020s), American economist
- Scott Neustadter (born 1977), American screenwriter and producer
- Scott Neville (born 1989), Australian soccer player
- Scott Niedermayer (born 1973), American ice hockey player
- Scott Norton (born 1961), American semi-retired professional wrestler
- Scott Norton (bowler) (born 1982), American professional bowler and attorney
- Scott Oberg (born 1990), American baseball player
- T. Scott Offutt (1872–1943), justice of the Maryland Court of Appeals
- Scott Orndoff (born 1993), American football player
- Scott Owen (born 1975), Australian musician, The Living End
- Scott Page (fl. 1970s–2020s), American musician
- Scott Palmer (American football) (born 1948), American football player
- Scott E. Parazynski (born 1961), American physician and a former NASA astronaut
- Scott Patterson (disambiguation), multiple people
- Scott Paulin (born 1950), American actor and director
- Scott Pendlebury (born 1988), Australian football player
- Scott Perry (disambiguation), multiple people
- Scott Peterson (born 1972), American criminal convicted of the murder of Laci Peterson
- Scottie Pippen (born 1965), basketball player
- Scott Podsednik (born 1976), American baseball player
- Scott Porter (born 1979), American actor and occasional singer
- Scott Porter (rugby league) (born 1985), Australian former professional rugby league footballer
- Scott Powell (born 1948), American musician
- Scott Putski (born 1966), American professional wrestler
- Scott Quessenberry (born 1995), American football player
- Scott Quigley (born 1992), English professional footballer
- Scott Quinnell (born 1972), Welsh former dual-code rugby union and rugby league player
- Scott Rains (1956–2016), American travel writer, consultant, and advocate for disabled people
- Scott Radinsky (born 1968), American MLB player
- Scott Raynor (born 1978), drummer for the band Blink-182
- Scott Redl (born 1961), Canadian football player
- Scott James Remnant (born 1980), English open source software engineer
- Scott Rolen (born 1975), American baseball player
- Scott Rudin (born 1958), American film, television, and theatre producer
- Scott Ryan (disambiguation), multiple people
- Scott Schenkel (fl. 2000s–2020s), American business executive, CEO of eBay
- Scott Schoeneweis (born 1973), American baseball player
- Scott Schwedes (born 1965), American football player
- Scott Seiss (born 1994), actor, comedian and TikToker
- Scott Semptimphelter (born 1972), American football player
- Scott Servais (born 1967), American baseball manager and former player
- Scott Shannon (fl. c. late 20th century), American journalist
- Scott Shleifer (born 1977), American billionaire hedge fund manager
- Scott Simon (born 1961), American Republican member
- Scott Slutzker (born 1972), American football player
- Scott Soracco, American politician
- Scott Spann (swimmer) (born 1988), American swimmer
- Scott Speed (born 1983), American NASCAR driver
- Scott Speedman (born 1975), British-Canadian actor
- Scott Speicher (1957–1991), American naval aviator
- Scott Spiegel (born 1957), American screenwriter, film director, producer and actor
- Scott Stapp (born 1973), American singer, songwriter, and founding member of the band Creed
- Scott Steiner (born 1962), American professional wrestler
- Scott Steinert (1962–1997), American outlaw biker and gangster
- Scott Stevens (born 1964), American ice hockey player
- Scott Stringer (born 1960), American New York City Comptroller and Borough President of Manhattan, 2021 mayoral candidate for New York City
- Scott Symons (1933–2009), Canadian writer
- Scott Tanser (born 1994), English footballer
- Scott Teems (fl. 2000s–2020s), American film director, screenwriter, and producer
- Scott Terry (baseball) (born 1959), American baseball player
- Scott Thompson (disambiguation), multiple people
- Scott Tippetts, American politician
- Scott Tolzien (born 1987), American football player
- Scott Touzinsky (born 1982), American volleyball player and coach
- Scott Travis (born 1961), American drummer for the band Judas Priest
- Scott Tucker (disambiguation), multiple people
- Scott Tuma (fl. 1980s–2020s), American musician from Chicago
- Scott Tupper (born 1986), Canadian field hockey player
- Scott Unrein (born 1976), American composer
- Scott Vallow (born 1977), retired American soccer player
- Scott Van Pelt (born 1966), American sportscaster
- Scott Walker, multiple people
- Scott L. Waugh (born 1948), American historian and academic administrator
- Scott Weiland (1967–2015), American lead singer of Stone Temple Pilots and Velvet Revolver
- Scott Weinger (born 1975), American actor
- Scott Weiss (fl. 2000s–2020s), American venture capitalist
- Scott James Wells (1961–2015), American actor and model
- Scott White (disambiguation), several people
- Scott Williams (disambiguation), multiple people
- Scott Willis (politician) (born c. 1969), New Zealand politician
- Scott Wilson (disambiguation), multiple people
- Scott Wimmer (born 1976), American former NASCAR driver
- Scott Wolf (disambiguation), several people
- Scott Wood (born 1990), American basketball player
- Scott Wood (American football) (born 1968), American football player
- Scott Woods (born 1971), American poet
- Scott Woodward (athletic director) (fl. 1980s–2020s), collegiate athletic director
- Scott Woodward (biologist) (fl. 1970s–2020s), microbiologist and molecular biologist
- Scott Wozniak (born 1997), American creator of Scott the Woz
- Scott Young, multiple people
- Scott Zahra (born 1974), former Australian rugby league footballer
- Scott Zakarin (born 1963), American film producer
- Scott Zolak (born 1967), American football broadcaster
- Scott Zwizanski (born 1977), American cyclist

== Fictional characters ==
- Scott (Ninjago), a character in Ninjago
- Scott Bernard in Robotech (TV series)
- Scott "Tracker" Cameron, in Degrassi: The Next Generation
- Scott Denoga, in an animated science fiction action Hailey's On It!
- Scott Drinkwell, character from the British soap opera Hollyoaks
- Scott (Heroes), marine recruited by the Pinehearst Company
- Scott Lang, Marvel superhero who uses Pym Particles to become the Ant-Man
  - Scott Lang (Marvel Cinematic Universe), his Marvel Cinematic Universe counterpart
- Scott Malkinson, a character from South Park
- Scott Pilgrim, protagonist of an eponymous graphic novel series
- Cpl. Scott Riley, character in Call of Duty: United Offensive
- Scott Robinson, a character in the Australian soap opera Neighbours
- Scott Sterling (fictional), a football goalie appearing in sketch comedy
- Scott Summers, also known as Cyclops, member and leader of the Marvel Comics team, the X-Men
- Scott Tracy in the British TV series Thunderbirds
- Scott Templeton, a character from The Wire
- Scott Tenorman, a character from South Park

== See also ==
- Scott (surname)
