= Jazz Bilzen =

Belgian Jazz Festival

- Poster to the 1979 edition
- Genre: Rock, jazz, pop, etc.
- Locations: Bilzen; Belgium
- Years active: 1965–1981, 1998

Jazz Bilzen was an annual multi-day open air jazz and pop festival that took place from 1965 to 1981 in the Belgian city of Bilzen. Jazz Bilzen was the first festival on the continent where jazz and pop music were brought together. For this reason, Jazz Bilzen is sometimes called the "mother of all European festivals".

== History ==
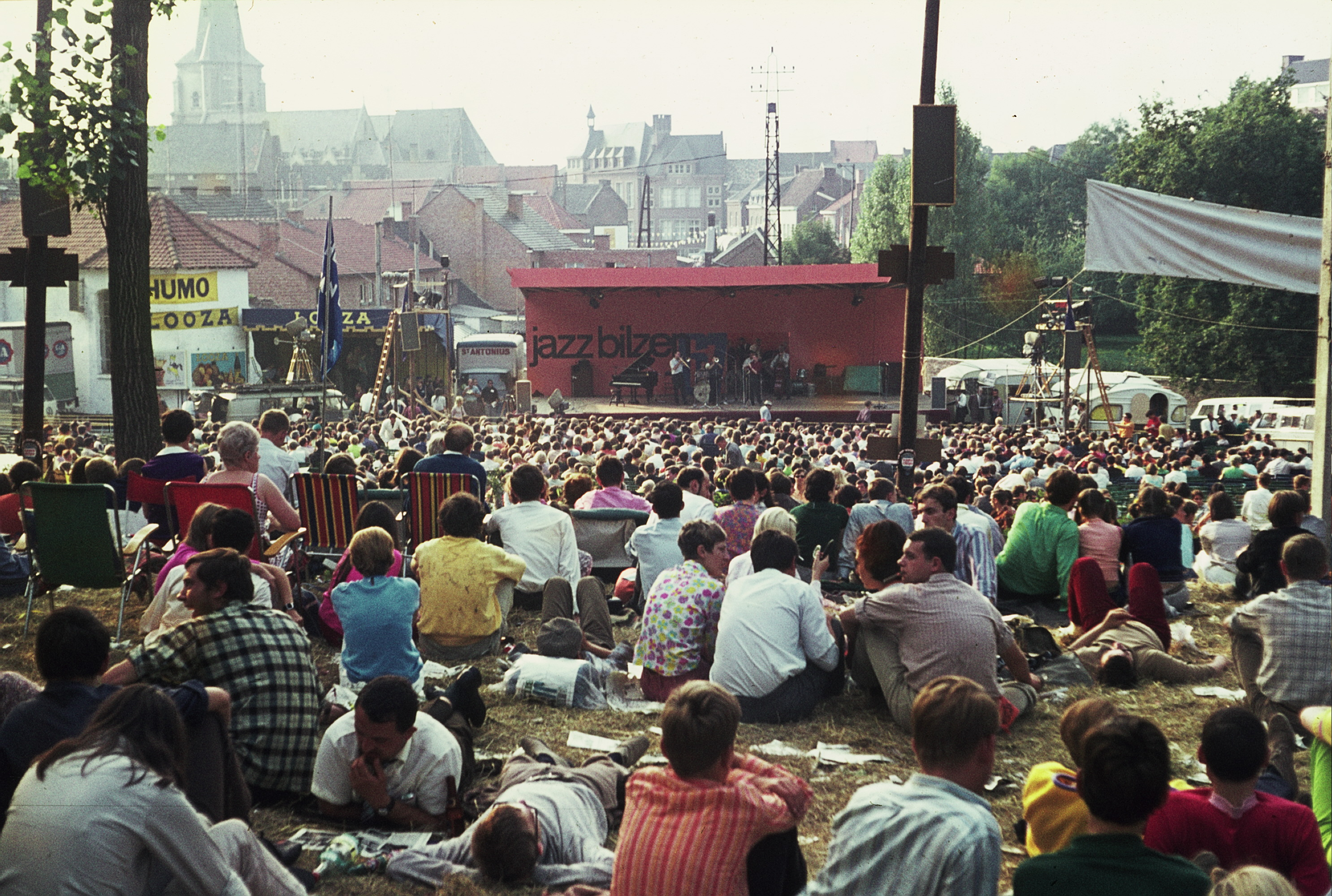
1967 Jazz Bilzen

Like the National Jazz and Blues Festival in the United Kingdom, and the Jazz Festival International in Comblain-la-Tour, which were paradigms, Bilzen started out solely as a jazz festival. Pretty soon however blues, skiffle, beat, folk and soul, in the end even punk, reggae and new wave, came to be incorporated as well. Initially, Humo, a popular Belgian weekly magazine, was the main sponsor. After several years, they withdrew because they got fed up with the security branch and the riots they caused. The festival organisation now had to look for different sponsors (such as Coca-Cola, Ford, provincial newspapers), which was indicative of the beginning of the end. From the 1980s onwards, the festival was superseded by Torhout-Werchter, which has now become Rock Werchter. The last edition of Jazz Bilzen took place in 1981. A one-off revival festival was organized in 1998.

== Lineups ==
Jazz Bilzen was a trailblazer not only in terms of organization; the festival also had a legendary knack for spotting talent. As early as the very first edition, a bearded folk singer from Antwerp, Ferre Grignard, appeared alongside the jazz cats. Although virtually unknown outside his hometown, that changed forever after his appearance in Bilzen; the performance launched his career and marked his definitive breakthrough. Grignard was not the only one to receive a career boost there: The Pebbles, Shocking Blue, Golden Earring, Black Sabbath, Rod Stewart, The Clash, The Cure, and The Police all performed at Jazz Bilzen just before scoring global hits. British psych-rockers Procol Harum even made their stage debut there in 1967, and for icons like Ike & Tina Turner, Jazz Bilzen served as their introduction to the European festival circuit.

Some of the pop/rock artists that performed at the festival included: AC/DC, Aerosmith, Al Stewart, Alberto y Lost Trios Paranoias, Alvin Lee, America, Armand, Badfinger, Barclay James Harvest, Beggars Opera, Black Oak Arkansas, Black Sabbath, Blondie, Blossom Toes, Blues Dimension, Bonzo Dog Doo Dah Band, Boudewijn de Groot, Bram Tchaikovsky, Burnin' Plague, Camel, Cat Stevens, CCC Inc., Climax Blues Band, Colin Blunstone, Cos, Cuby + Blizzards, Curved Air, Deep Purple, De Dream, Dexys Midnight Runners, Eire Apparent, Ekseption, Elvis Costello, Faces, Fairport Convention, Frankie Miller, Focus, Ginger Baker, Girlschool, Golden Earring, Greenslade, Group 1850, Herman Brood, Humble Pie, Ian Gillan Band, Ian Hunter, Inner Circle, Jan Akkerman, Jango Edwards, Japan, Jeff Beck, John Cale, John Miles, JSD Band, Kandahar, Kevin Ayers, Kevin Coyne, Lindisfarne, Long Tall Ernie & the Shakers, Lou Reed, Machiavel, Magma, Man, Marsha Hunt, MC5, Medicine Head, Michael Chapman, Mott the Hoople, Mungo Jerry, Nils Lofgren, Partner, Procol Harum, Ramones, Rare Bird, Raymond van het Groenewoud, Rick Wakeman, Rory Gallagher, Sandy Denny, Screaming Lord Sutch, Shocking Blue, Slade, Small Faces, Soft Machine, Spencer Davis Group, Status Quo, Steeleye Span, Stiff Little Fingers, Stray, Supercharge, Supersister, Sutherland Brothers & Quiver, Taste, TC Matic, T. Rex, Ted Nugent, The Blue Diamonds, The Clash, The Cure, The Damned, The Guess Who, The Holy Modal Rounders, The Idle Race, The Jam, The Kids, The Kinks, The Moody Blues, The Move, The Pebbles, The Police, The Pretty Things, The Ro-D-Ys, The Sensational Alex Harvey Band, The Troggs, Thin Lizzy, Third World War, Uriah Heep, Van Morrison, Wishbone Ash, Whitesnake, Wizzard, and Zen.

Some of the jazz/blues/folk/soul and other greats who made their appearances, were: Alan Stivell, Alexis Korner, Archie Shepp, Arthur Conley, Brian Auger, Brownie McGhee, Cecil Taylor, Champion Jack Dupree, Charles Lloyd, Charles Mingus, Chick Corea, Clark Terry, Dan Ar Braz, Dexter Gordon, Dizzy Gillespie, Dutch Swing College Band, Eddie Boyd, Elvin Jones, Franco Manzecchi, Freddie Hubbard, Gato Barbieri, Han Bennink, Herman van Veen, Ike & Tina Turner, Isotope, James Brown, Jan Hammer, Jean-Luc Ponty, Joe Henderson, John McLaughlin, Keith Jarrett, Klaus Doldinger, Larry Coryell, Mahavishnu Orchestra, Marc Moulin, Memphis Slim, Nucleus, Ornette Coleman, Paco de Lucia, Passport, Peter Brötzmann, Pharoah Sanders Quartet, Philip Catherine, Pim Jacobs, Ralph McTell, Reverend Gary Davis, Rita Reys, Romanesj Gypsy Orchestra, Slide Hampton, Sonny Rollins, Sonny Terry, Stanley Clarke, Steve Shorter, Toots Thielemans, Wannes Van de Velde, Weather Report, Will Tura, Willem Vermandere, Yusef Lateef, and Zoot Sims.

Notable non-appearances amongst invited artists included: Badger, ELO, Elton John, Frank Zappa, Jack Bruce, Jo Lemaire, Mimi Fariña, Pentangle, Pink Floyd, Ramones, The Nice, and Yes.

== Festival by year ==
| Year | Dates | Main artists |
|---|---|---|
| 1965 | 5 September | Al Jones, Jack Sels Quartet, Rita Reys, Ferre Grignard Skiffle Group, Champion Jack Dupree |
| 1966 | 27–28 August | Jeff Gilson, Jon Eardley, Jack Sels Quintet, Eddie Boyd Quartet, The Peanuts, Ferre Grignard Skiffle Group, Dusko Goykovich, Carmell Jones & Trio Jacques Schols, Benny Baily & Trio Jacques Schols, Nathan Davis Quintet, Yusef Lateef |
| 1967 | 25-26-27 August | Jeanne Lee, Ferre Grignard, Dutch Swing College Band, Brian and the Guess Who, Dakota Staton, Roland Van Campenhout, Armand, The Pebbles, Boudewijn de Groot, Wannes Van de Velde, Procol Harum |
| 1968 | 23-24-25 August | Alexis Korner, Piet Noordijk Kwartet, Roland and the Blues Workshop, Zen, Pierre Favre Ensemble Ensemble, Cees See, Terry Clark, Deena Webster, Dexter Gordon Quartet, The Vipers, Tyrannosaurus Rex, Simon Dupree and the Big Sound, The Move, The Pretty Things, Small Faces, Chris Farlowe, Cuby + Blizzards |
| 1969 | 21-22-23-24 August | The Bonzo Dog Band, Blossom Toes, Eire Apparent, Cees See, The Aynsley Dunbar Retaliation, Shocking Blue, Soft Machine, Brian Auger and the Trinity, Deep Purple, Taste, The Ornette Coleman Quartet, Keith Jarrett Trio, The Moody Blues, Humble Pie |
| 1970 | 21-22-23 August | Stu Martin, Pierre Favre, Cat Stevens, Kleptomania, Wild Angels, The Humblebums, Screaming Lord Sutch, Jan Ptaszyn Wróblewski, Rare Bird, Champion Jack Dupree, Badfinger, Eddie Boyd, May Blitz, Annie Ross, Dizzy Gillespie, Black Sabbath, The Kinks |
| 1971 | 20-21-22 August | Larry Coryell & Friends, Dave Kelly, John Marshall, Peter Warren, Richard Boone, Jaki Byard Quartet, Supersister, Walter De Buck & De Kadullen, Gato Barbieri, Albert Mangelsdorff, Peter Brötzmann with Fred Van Hove & Han Bennink, Roland Van Campenhout, Reverend Gary Davis, Jimmy Heath, Jean-Luc Ponty, Al Stewart, Rory Gallagher & Friends, Rod Stewart & Faces |
| 1972 | 18-19-20 August | Charles Mingus Sextet, Pigsty Hill Light Orchestra, Etcetera, Roy Wood with Wizzard, Bond and Brown, The Holy Modal Rounders, Lindisfarne, Michael Chapman, Brewers Droop, Sonny Rollins, Stone the Crows, MC 5 |
| 1973 | 17-18-19 August | Johnny Mars, Medicine Head, Long Tall Ernie and The Shakers, Colin Blunstone, Barclay James Harvest, Beggars Opera, Archie Shepp, Argent, The Troggs, Golden Earring, The Spencer Davis Group, Cecil Taylor, Ralph McTell, Soft Machine, Procol Harum, Wizzard |
| 1974 | 15-16-17-18 August | Caravan, JSD Band, Isotope, Esperanto, Toots Thielemans Quartet, Kevin Coyne, The Sensational Alex Harvey Band, Memphis Slim, Mungo Jerry, Alan Stivell, Greenslade, Johnny Griffin, Kevin Ayers, Focus, Humble Pie, Rod Stewart & Faces |
| 1975 | 15-16-17 August | Pell Mell, Steve Harley & Cockney Rebel, Alberto y Lost Trios Paranoias, Climax Blues Band, Sailor, Earth and Fire, Roland Van Campenhout, Cousin Joe Pleasant from New Orleans, Ike & Tina Turner, John Cale, Fairport Convention & Sandy Denny, Caravan, Wishbone Ash, Mahavishnu Orchestra |
| 1976 | 13-14-15 August | The Jess Roden Band, Mott, Carmell Jones, Max Collie Rhythm Aces, Tjens Couter, Alvin Allcorn’s International New Dixieland, Supercharge, Machiavel, Rhoda Scott, Black Oak Arkansas, Passport, Sutherland Brothers & Quiver, Status Quo, Frankie Miller & Full House, Rick Wakeman, Steeleye Span, Kevin Ayers, Camel |
| 1977 | 11-12-13-14 August | Ted Easton, Mike Carr, Tony Scott, Blue, The Stanley Clarke Band, Lou Bennett, The Albion Dance Band, Art Taylor, Horslips, The Sensational Alex Harvey Band, John Miles, Graham Parker & The Rumour, Roland Van Campenhout, Ian Gillan Band, Colosseum II, Johan Verminnen, Ted Nugent, Uriah Heep, Thin Lizzy, Aerosmith, Elvis Costello, The Damned, The Clash, Small Faces |
| 1978 | 10-11-12-13 August | Little Bob Story, The Radio Stars, Philip Catherine & Niels Pedersen, The Kids, The Pleasers, Larry Coryell, Tyla Gang, Lindisfarne, Gruppo Sportivo, Herman Brood & His Wild Romance, John McLaughlin, The Jam, The Boomtown Rats, Lou Reed, Raymond van het Groenewoud & The Millionaires, Blondie, Fairport Convention, The Kinks, James Brown |
| 1979 | 17-18-19 August | Sonny Terry & Brownie McGhee, Voyager, Marseille, The Alvin Lee Band, Nils Lofgren, Bram Tchaikovsky, Inner Circle, AC/DC, Whitesnake, Uriah Heep, Van Morrison, Stiff Little Fingers, The Cure, The Specials, The Police, The Pretenders |
| 1980 | 15-16-17 August | Girlschool, Womega, Stu Goldberg, Philip Catherine & Didier Lockwood, The Kids, Tommy Tucker, The Lambrettas, The Shirts, Urban Heroes, The Stranglers, Rick Tubbax & The Taxis, Raymond van het Groenewoud & The Centimeters, TC Matic, Jan Akkerman Band, Dexys Midnight Runners |
| 1981 | 14-15-16 August | Jango Edwards, Danny Lademacher’s Innersleeve, Ian Hunter Band, Nucleus, Didier Lockwood, Toots Thielemans, De Kreuners, Slade, TC Matic, The Polecats, The Employees, Scooter |
| 1998 | 1–2 August | Michel Bisceglia, Keter Betts, Wizards of Ooze, Grady Tate, The Mike Flowers Pops, Frank Foster, Steve Harley & Cockney Rebel, Slide Hampton, Jon Faddis, Status Quo, Youssou N’Dour, Tommy Flanagan, Al Jarreau, Marlena Shaw, Milt Jackson, Ten Years After, Squeeze, Ray Davies |

== See also ==
- List of jazz festivals
- List of historic rock festivals
