= Scotty's =

Scotty's may refer to:

- Scotty's (charity), British military bereavement charity
- Scotty's Builders Supply, defunct American retailer

== See also ==
- Scotty (disambiguation)
- Scottie (disambiguation)
