= Scooter =

Scooter may refer to:

== Vehicles ==
=== Ground ===
==== Two-wheeled land vehicles ====
- Kick scooter, propelled by a standing rider pushing off the ground
  - Eccentric-hub scooter, propelled by a standing rider making a bouncing motion
  - Motorized scooter, a powered vehicle similar to a kick scooter, ridden standing up
    - E-scooter or electric kick scooter, powered by an electric motor
- Self-balancing scooter, a dicycle with an electric motor, ridden standing up
- Scooter (motorcycle), a motorcycle with a step-through frame, a seat, and a platform for the rider's feet

==== Mobility devices ====
- Knee scooter, a mobility device used as an alternative to the traditional crutch
- Mobility scooter, an electric mobility aid with more than two wheels

=== Air ===
- "Scooter", a nickname for the Douglas A-4 Skyhawk ground-attack aircraft
- Sopwith Scooter, an unarmed parasol monoplane
- SCOOTER, callsign for the airline Scoot

== Arts and entertainment ==
=== Fictional characters ===
- Scooter (Borderlands), a mechanic in the video game series
- Scooter (Coronation Street), a boyfriend of Sarah Platt
- Scooter (Gobots), the Guardians' resident inventor in the toyline
- Scooter (How I Met Your Mother character), Lily's high-school boyfriend
- Scooter (Muppet), the stage manager of the in-universe Muppet Show
- Scooter, from the Papa Louie video games
- Scooter (SpongeBob SquarePants), a purple fish who enjoys surfing
- Scooter (talking baseball), an animated character used in Fox Sports broadcasts
- Scooter, the protagonist of Swing with Scooter, a DC comic book published in the late 1960s
- Scooter, a nickname for J. D., the main protagonist of the TV series Scrubs
- Scooter, a character in Disney's 2008 film College Road Trip
- Scooter McNutty, a squirrel from Barney & Friends
- Scooter (VeggieTales), a carrot in the Christian children's media franchise

=== Music ===
- Scooter (Belgian band), a pop group
- Scooter (band), a German dance and trance group
- "Scooter", a song by Lolo Zouaï on Playgirl (XL), 2022

=== Other uses in arts and entertainment ===
- Scooter, a novel by Mick Foley
- Scooter: Secret Agent, a children's television program named after the title character

== Science ==
- Scooter (bird), or scoter, a genus of seaducks
- Water scooters (Gerridae), a family of waterbugs
- The Scooter (Neptune), a storm on the planet Neptune

== People ==
- Scooter (nickname)
- Young Scooter, stage name of American rapper Edward Bailey (born 1986)

== Other uses ==
- Scooter (skirt), a pair of shorts resembling a skirt

== See also ==
- Scooter Girl (disambiguation)
- Scooterboy, one of several scooter-related subcultures
- Scootering (disambiguation)
