= Verminnen =

Verminnen may refer to:

- Johan Verminnen (born 1951), Flemish singer
- 11846 Verminnen, main-belt minor planet
