= Scoot (disambiguation) =

Scoot is a low-cost airline based in Singapore.

Scoot or skoot may also refer to:

- SCOOT (bus service), a shuttle service in California
- Scoot (EP), a 1997 EP album
- Skoot (ship)
- Scoot McNairy (born 1977), American actor and producer
- Scoot Networks, an American company which provides public electric scooter sharing systems
- Split Cycle Offset Optimisation Technique, a traffic control system
- SKØØT, a streetwear label designed by MLMA

== See also ==
- Scooter (disambiguation)
- Scootering (disambiguation)
