= Smooter =

Smooter may refer to:

- Smooter family, fictional characters in Sweet Home Alabama (film)
- JB Smooter, fictional character in Perfect Harmony (musical)

== See also ==
- Scooter (nickname)
