= Scott & White =

Scott & White, namely Doctors Arthur C. Scott and Raleigh R. White, Jr., medical doctors of hospital projects:

- Scott & White Memorial Hospital, primary clinical teaching campus of Texas A&M Health Science Center in Temple, Texas
- Scott & White Sleep Disorders Center, research center for sleep disorders in Temple, Texas
- Baylor Scott & White Health, a healthcare network formerly called Scott & White Health
