= Roland Van Campenhout =

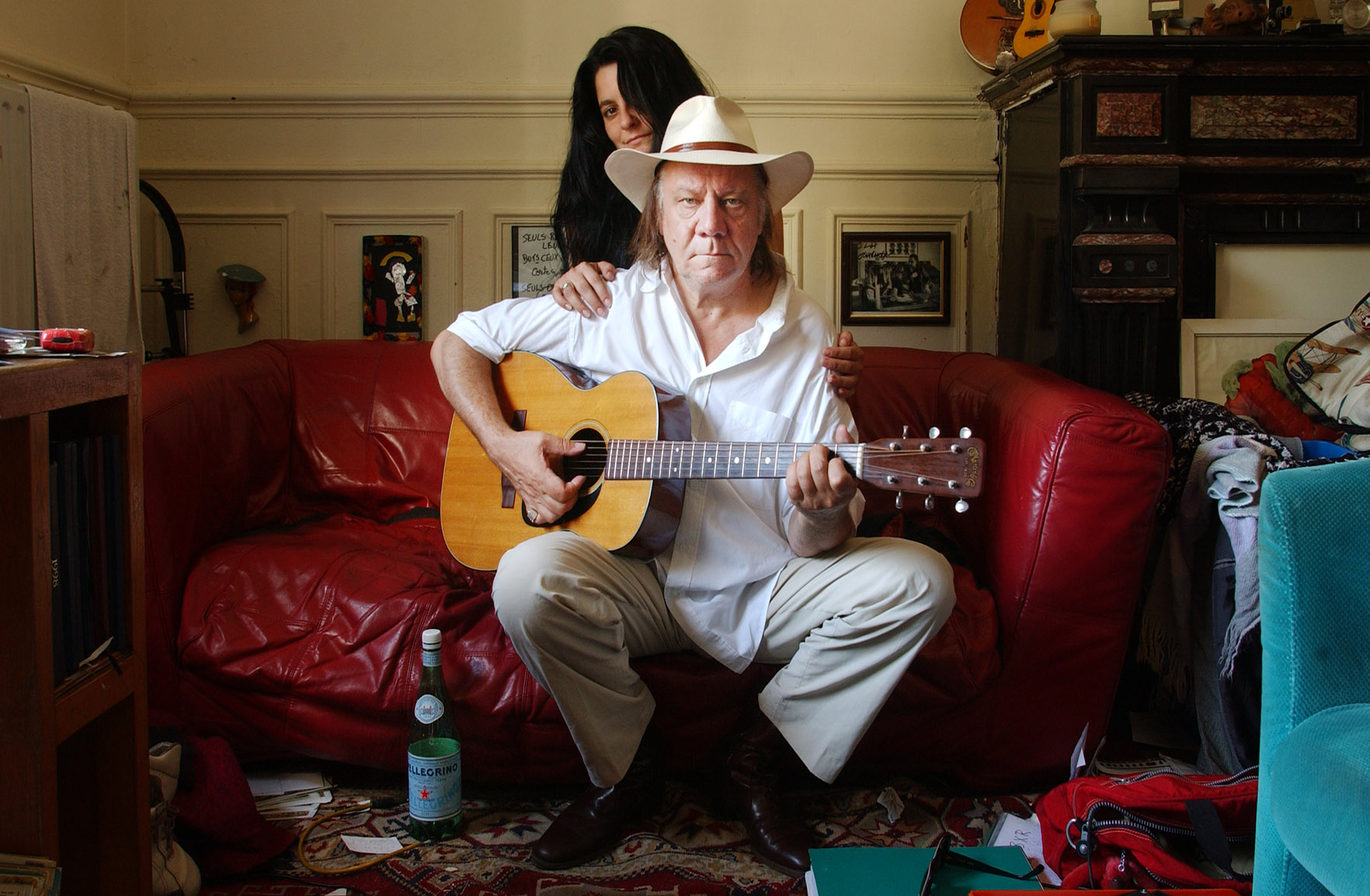

Background information
- Born: 1944 (age 81–82); Boom, Belgium
- Genres: Rock; Cabaret; Folk; Blues
- Occupations: Singer musician
- Years active: 1970–present
- Website: rolandvancampenhout.be

Roland Van Campenhout or in short Roland (born 1944 in Boom, Belgium) is a Flemish blues musician.

Roland grew up in the Rupel area. His father, a jazzmusician, drowned when he was 5. Roland left home at the age of 14. He did not get involved with music until the age of 20. He played in the skifflegroup, the William & Roland Skiffle Group, and the folk duo Miek en Roel.

In 1969, he changed to another genre: blues, while also still experimenting with other styles during his career such as country, worldmusic, folk and rock. Roland discovered this genre when he saw John Lee Hooker perform in café De Muze in Antwerp. He broke through during Jazz Bilzen, where he established his reputation as a live artist.

== 1970s and 1980s ==
During the 1970s he joined Rory Gallagher's band and toured around the world, including to Singapore. He performed with Tim Hardin, Leo Kottke and Ian Anderson. Roland built a reputation as a roaming musician traveling from café to café. This became less after the birth of his daughter.

In 1985, he achieved commercial success with the record 76cm Per Second, including hits such as "Fish On The Hook" and "Cruising Down On Main Street".

== 1990s ==
He was successful in working together with Arno Hintjens and with the "Charles et les Lulus" project (1990–1991).

In 1998, Roland got to interview his idol John Lee Hooker. A year later he was awarded the Lifetime achievement-award by the Zamu Music Awards.

== 2000s ==
Roland was very active in both blues and country fields during the 2000s. In 2008, he recorded the album Never Enough with Admiral Freebee, for which he received a Music Industry Award in the Best Artwork category a year later. On 5 February 2015, he was inducted into the Radio 2 Hall of Fame.

== Discography ==
During his career, Van Campenhout released next records.

=== Studio albums ===
- A Tune for You (1971)
- One Step at a Time (1972)
- Movin' on (1975)
- Snowblind (1981)
- 76 Centimeters per Second (1985)
- Good as Bad Can Be (1989) (as Roland and the Bluesworkshop)
- Hole in Your Soul (1990)
- Last Letter Home (1992)
- Mannen Maken Plannen – soundtrack (1993)
- Little Sweet Taste (1994)
- Waltz... (1999)
- Nomaden van de Muziek (with Wannes Van de Velde, 2000)
- Waterbottle (with El Fish, 2001)
- Lime & Coconut (2003)
- The Great Atomic Power (2005)
- Never Enough (2008)
- New Found Sacred Ground (2013)
- Folksongs from a Non-existing Land (2018)
- Wonderful Human Beings (2021)

=== Live albums ===
- Rock Live (1974) (as Roland and the Bluesworkshop)
- 20 Years! Live Gentse Feesten (1983) (as Roland and the Bluesworkshop)
- Live (1990) (as Roland & Friends)
- Dah Blues Iz-a Comming (2013)
- Somewhere in the Mountains (2019)

=== Compilation albums ===
- 50 (1994)
- Day by Day, Blow by Blow (1994)
- Parcours (2009)
- Alle 40 Goed (2012)

=== Singles ===
- Your Trip Is Not like Mine (1968)
- Buddy Is Holly (1971)
- Le Brabant Sonne (1980)
- Chain Gang (1983)
- Cruising Down on Mainstreet (1985)
- Fish on the Hook (1985)
- C'est si Bon (1988)
- I'll Give All I've Got (1989)
- Last Letter Home (1992)
- A Man Needs a Plan (1992)
- Don't This Road Look Rough and Rocky (1992)
- Little Sweet Taste (1994)
- Down Along the Cove (1998)
- Hash Bamboo Shuffle (1998)
- Plastic Jezus (1999)
- Lime in the Coconut (2003)
- Bird in My Pyjamas (2004)
- The Truth (2005)

As a guest guitarist or singer, Van Campenhout appears on records of Rory Gallagher, Arno, Paul Michiels and Johan Verminnen among others.
