= Popularity of birth names for males (United States) =

Popularity of birth names for males in the United States lists the most popular names given baby boys between 1926 and 2025. The most popular names given baby boys are also listed by decades beginning in the 1880s. The data illustrates the rise and fall in the popularity of names given to baby boys.

The Social Security Administration rank orders for popular names from 1926 to 2025. Thus the numerical ranking does not take into account births between 1880 and 1925. The ranking is also influenced by the varying number of children born in each decade. The years in which total births reached a peak in numbers with more than four million births are 1954-1964 and 2000-2009. Names popular in those years would likely rank higher on this list than names popular in years in which fewer births were recorded. In addition, people born before 1937 but alive in that year sometimes did not register for social security cards and are not included in the data.

Three names -- James, John, and William -- are among the top 30 most popular given names in every decade from the 1880s until 2025. The most popular boys names for the 2010s and 2020s were Liam and Noah. They have only recently become popular and did not make the list of fifty most popular names from 1926 to 2025.

The Social Security Administration (SSA) compiled this information about births. In accordance with SSA practice, names are listed with the exact spelling of the birth name. For example, "Steven" and "Stephen" are listed separately.

== Rank in popularity of birth names given males born in the United States (a dash means not in top 200 names) ==
name	1926-2025 rank	1880s	1890s	1900s	1910s	1920s	1930s	1940s	1950s	1960s	1970s	1980s	1990s	2000s	2010s	2020s
James	1	3	3	3	3	3	2	1	1	4	5	6	13	17	9	4
Michael	2	50	54	45	44	52	35	9	2	1	1	1	1	2	7	16
John	3	1	1	1	1	2	3	3	4	3	6	9	15	18	26	21
Robert	4	9	8	6	4	1	1	2	3	5	7	8	20	36	64	85
David	5	20	29	31	29	22	11	6	5	2	4	5	12	12	18	29
William	6	2	2	2	2	4	4	4	6	7	9	15	18	10	4	6
Richard	7	23	27	22	15	8	5	5	7	8	16	27	41	90	146	-
Joseph	8	7	6	7	5	7	10	13	13	12	11	10	10	9	20	28
Thomas	9	10	12	10	10	11	9	8	8	9	20	24	26	37	49	43
Christopher	10	177	-	-	-	-	-	147	49	20	2	2	2	6	27	57
Charles	11	5	5	5	7	5	6	7	10	17	23	33	43	58	50	50
Daniel	12	31	41	49	52	45	42	22	19	19	12	7	8	5	12	15
Matthew	13	127	141	165	150	171	-	192	99	36	10	3	3	4	16	35
Anthony	14	93	78	48	38	41	47	45	30	22	22	20	19	11	21	46
Mark	15	145	155	190	-	-	183	54	9	6	18	34	48	111	190	-
Steven	16	-	-	-	-	-	-	29	11	11	19	25	35	79	145	-
Andrew	17	27	34	40	46	56	75	87	64	38	28	13	7	7	25	60
Donald	18	-	101	52	20	10	7	12	14	25	42	66	134	-	-	-
Joshua	19	-	-	-	-	-	-	-	-	-	24	4	4	3	23	58
Paul	20	44	22	20	14	14	14	17	17	18	27	40	64	130	200	-
Kevin	21	-	-	-	-	-	-	167	27	14	13	23	25	33	75	186
Kenneth	22	-	125	53	30	19	15	16	16	21	31	46	66	121	195	-
Brian	23	-	-	-	-	-	-	112	34	16	8	16	36	62	174	-
Timothy	24	190	-	-	-	-	-	63	22	13	21	26	38	82	140	-
Ronald	25	-	-	-	170	93	13	10	15	24	43	67	136	-	-	-
Jason	26	-	-	-	-	-	-	-	-	88	3	11	45	50	78	141
George	27	4	4	4	6	6	8	15	25	33	53	68	107	144	-	-
Edward	28	11	9	9	8	9	12	18	23	29	40	57	86	131	158	-
Jeffrey	29	-	-	-	-	-	-	88	24	10	15	29	54	161	-	-
Jacob	30	49	73	98	121	168	-	-	-	-	78	35	5	1	3	30
Ryan	31	-	-	-	-	-	-	-	-	-	25	14	14	15	35	77
Nicholas	32	180	181	153	110	131	152	148	140	144	51	19	6	14	55	103
Gary	33	-	-	-	-	-	45	14	12	26	47	78	174	-	-	-
Eric	34	-	-	-	-	-	-	151	74	28	14	21	29	63	123	-
Jonathan	35	-	-	-	-	-	-	199	128	77	32	18	21	19	42	79
Stephen	36	89	105	96	89	116	105	25	11	11	19	36	49	137	-	-
Larry	37	-	-	-	-	190	30	11	18	35	58	95	200	-	-	-
Justin	38	-	-	-	-	-	-	-	-	-	38	12	17	29	90	190
Benjamin	39	32	47	65	74	91	121	135	137	130	44	31	30	25	11	10
Scott	40	-	-	-	-	-	-	164	36	15	17	38	79	-	-	-
Brandon	41	-	-	-	-	-	-	-	-	-	52	17	11	21	71	-
Samuel	42	17	25	32	40	46	63	65	73	85	64	52	33	24	22	19
Alexander	43	82	93	97	102	137	189	185	-	-	107	50	23	13	8	17
Gregory	44	-	-	-	-	-	-	64	26	23	29	45	75	191	-	-
Patrick	45	77	86	100	151	143	104	58	40	32	37	37	42	97	157	-
Jack	46	66	44	29	23	17	18	35	60	102	146	167	100	40	40	14
Frank	47	6	7	8	9	12	16	21	35	43	65	88	147	-	-	-
Raymond	48	57	26	21	16	15	17	23	38	45	61	76	118	189	-	-
Dennis	49	122	162	188	-	174	71	20	21	39	59	98	178	-	-	-
Aaron	50	149	186	182	-	-	-	-	-	127	35	32	31	52	48	70

== Top 50 male birth names: Top year in rank and numbers of babies given that name (1880-2025) ==
name	1926-2025 rank	Top year in ranking	Percentage of male babies given name in top year	Most male babies born with this name (year)	Most popular years (In top 30 of male birth names)
James	1	1944	5.539%	94,767 (1947)	1880-2025
Michael	2	1969	4.656%	92,781 (1957)	1937-2025
John	3	1880	8.200%	88,324 (1947)	1880-2025
Robert	4	1931	5.657%	91,655 (1947)	1880-2001
David	5	1955	4.129%	86,306 (1955)	1880-1894, 1916-2021
William	6	1880	8.051%	67,002 (1947)	1880-2025
Richard	7	1946	3.567%	58,870 (1946)	1880-1987
Joseph	8	1914	2.756%	32,749 (1956)	1880-2024
Thomas	9	1951	2.525%	48,467 (1952)	1880-1986
Christopher	10	1984	3.198%	60,021 (1984)	1960-2014
Charles	11	1880	4.517%	40,781 (1947)	1880-1980
Daniel	12	1985	2.004%	38,559 (1985)	1880-1883, 1942-2025
Matthew	13	1983	2.694%	50,209 (1983)	1967-2020
Anthony	14	1987	1.186%	25,088 (1990)	1956-2016
Mark	15	1960	2.712%	58,727 (1960)	1948-1990
Steven	16	1955	1.811%	38,413 (1956)	1946-1992
Andrew	17	1987	1.856%	36,206 (1987)	1880-1885, 1972-2015
Donald	18	1934	2.863%	30,408 (1934)	1881, 1970-2012
Joshua	19	1985	2.193%	44,100 (1989)	1974-2014
Paul	20	1964	1.326%	27,012 (1946)	1892-1976
Kevin	21	1965	1.487%	30,131 (1963)	1954-1997
Kenneth	22	1951	1.352%	28,064 (1957)	1915-1973
Brian	23	1973	2.212%	36,305 (1972)	1957-1991
Timothy	24	1967	1.607%	30,783 (1959)	1951-1990
Ronald	25	1943	2.010%	34,899 (1947)	1931-1970
Jason	26	1974	3.359%	55,631 (1977)	1969-1988
George	27	1880	4.329%	27,476 (1921)	1880-1957
Edward	28	1882	2.030%	21,126 (1924)	1880-1966
Jeffrey	29	1966	1.662%	33,537 (1962)	1953-1985
Jacob	30	1998	1.777%	36,031 (1998)	1998-2021
Ryan	31	1985	1.554%	29,905 (1985)	1973-2013
Nicholas	32	1995	1.450%	29,160 (1995)	1978-2008
Gary	33	1951	1.996%	38,754 (1952)	1937-1966
Eric	34	1972	1.316%	23,571 (1970)	1965-1994
Jonathan	35	1985	1.253%	24,349 (1988)	1980-2010
Stephen	36	1951	1.176%	23,055 (1952)	1943-1971
Larry	37	1947	1.881%	34,946 (1947)	1936-1961
Justin	38	1981	1.751%	35,055 (1981)	1970-1999
Benjamin	39	1981	0.771%	15,733 (1989)	1888-1889, 1984-1989, 1996-2025
Scott	40	1971	1.700%	30,901 (1971)	1958-1979
Brandon	41	1985	1.523%	29,628 (1992)	1981-2006
Samuel	42	1880	0.506%	14,813 (2001)	1880-1899, 1996-2025
Alexander	43	1993	0.994%	20,530 (1993)	1990-2025
Gregory	44	1962	1.045%	21,976 (1962)	1950-1973
Patrick	45	1968	0.736%	14,692 (1964)	1964, 1967-1968
Jack	46	1921	1.102%	12,802 (1927)	1900, 1903-1940, 1944, 2019-2025
Frank	47	1880	2.738%	17,018 (1918)	1880-1950
Raymond	48	1919	1.121%	12,873 (1924)	1891-1949
Dennis	49	1946	1.300%	24,552 (1952)	1941-1959
Aaron	50	1981	0.789%	15,308 (1976)	1981-1984, 1992-1995

Source: Note: Year of most popularity is listed by percentage of total male births. In a few cases, there may be more births with that name in one year but a higher percentage of births with that same name in another year.
