= Scott White =

Scott White may refer to:

- Scott White (politician) (1970–2011), Democratic member of the Washington State Senate
- Scott White (director), American television director and producer
- Scott White (ice hockey) (born 1968), Canadian ice hockey executive
- Scott White (singer), member of the UK boyband The Reason 4
- Scott R. White (1963–2018), American engineer

== See also ==
- Scott Whyte (born 1978), American actor
- Scott & White, namely Doctors Arthur C. Scott and Raleigh R. White Jr., medical doctors of hospital projects
  - Scott & White Memorial Hospital, hospital and primary clinical teaching campus of Texas A&M Health Science Center College of Medicine
  - Scott & White Sleep Disorders Center, modern center of research into sleep disorders in Temple, Texas
