= Smart City Radio =

- Other names: Smart City
- Genre: Talk radio
- Running time: ca. 50 min.
- Country of origin: United States
- Language: English
- Home station: WKNO-FM
- Syndicates: NPR
- Hosted by: Carol Coletta
- Produced by: Scotty Iseri
- Executive producer: Carol Coletta
- Recording studio: Chicago, Illinois
- Original release: 2001 – present
- Audio format: Mono
- Opening theme: "Smart City"
- Podcast

Smart City is a weekly radio show broadcast on National Public Radio stations across the United States. Smart City is a weekly, hour-long public radio interview show that takes an in-depth look at urban life, the people, places, ideas and trends shaping cities, hosted by Carol Coletta.

== Host ==
Carol Coletta is president and CEO of CEOs for Cities and host and executive producer of the nationally syndicated public radio show Smart City. Before moving to Chicago to become CEOs for Cities, Coletta served as president of Coletta & Company in Memphis. In addition, she served as executive director of the Mayors’ Institute on City Design, a partnership of the National Endowment for the Arts, United States Conference of Mayors and American Architectural Foundation.

== Format ==
Smart City consists of two interviews with guests on topics pertaining to city life, urbanism, architecture and public policy. Regular segments include a news brief from the assistant editor of Planetizen.com, Nate Berg, and an essay from J. Walker Smith. Occasionally, Smart City will air pieces on city life, events, or other items of interest. The show is pre-recorded, and also available as a podcast.

== Staff and contributors ==
- Carol Coletta - host - executive producer
- Scotty Iseri - producer - contributing editor
- Nate Berg - correspondent: Planetizen.com
- J. Walker Smith - contributor: City Views
- Otis White: - former contributor

The show's theme was composed for the program by Robby Grant and Steve Selvidge.
