= Scott Patterson (disambiguation) =

Scott Patterson (born 1958), American actor and minor league baseball player

Scott Patterson may also refer to:

- Scott Patterson (artist) (1968–2016), American street artist
- Scott Patterson (author), American finance journalist & author
- Scott Patterson (baseball) (born 1979), Major League Baseball relief pitcher
- Scott Patterson (curler) (1969–2004), professional Canadian curler
- Scott Patterson (director) (born 1962), Australian film director and editor
- Scott Patterson (Paralympian) (born 1961), Canadian track athlete, alpine skier and swimmer
- Scott Patterson (skier, born 1992), American cross-country skier

== See also ==
- Scott Paterson (born 1972), Scottish footballer
- G. Scott Paterson (born 1964), venture capitalist
