= Scott Brown =

Scott Brown may refer to:

== Sportsmen ==
- Scott Brown (American football), American college football coach of Kentucky State
- Scott Brown (baseball) (1956–2026), American Major League Baseball pitcher for the Cincinnati Reds
- Scott Brown (footballer, born April 1985), English footballer (goalkeeper)
- Scott Brown (footballer, born May 1985), English footballer
- Scott Brown (footballer, born June 1985), Scottish footballer for Hibernian, Celtic and Scotland
- Scott Brown (footballer, born 1994), Scottish footballer for Raith Rovers and Peterhead
- Scott Brown (golfer) (born 1983), American professional golfer
- Scott Brown (gymnast) (born 1983), Australian trampolinist

== Others ==
- Scott Brown (bassist) (born 1964), Canadian bassist of the rock band Trooper
- Scott Brown (broadcaster), Scottish television producer
- Scott Brown (DJ) (born 1972), Scottish disc jockey
- Scott Brown (politician) (born 1959), former U.S. Ambassador to New Zealand and Samoa; former United States Senator
- Scott Brown (Royal Navy chaplain) (born 1968), Chaplain of the Fleet of the Royal Navy
- Scott Brown (writer), American author, screenwriter, critic, and composer
- Scott G. Brown (born 1966), Canadian scholar
- Scott O. Brown (born 1975), American writer and publisher
- Scott Wesley Brown (born 1952), American singer and songwriter
- Scott T. Brown, American pastor and author, proponent of the Family integrated church
- Scott Brown, character in The OA

== See also ==
- Archie Scott Brown (1927–1958), British racing driver
- Denise Scott Brown (born 1931), Rhodesian-American architect
- Scott Brow (born 1969), American baseball pitcher
