= The Kids (Belgian band) =

Belgian punk rock band

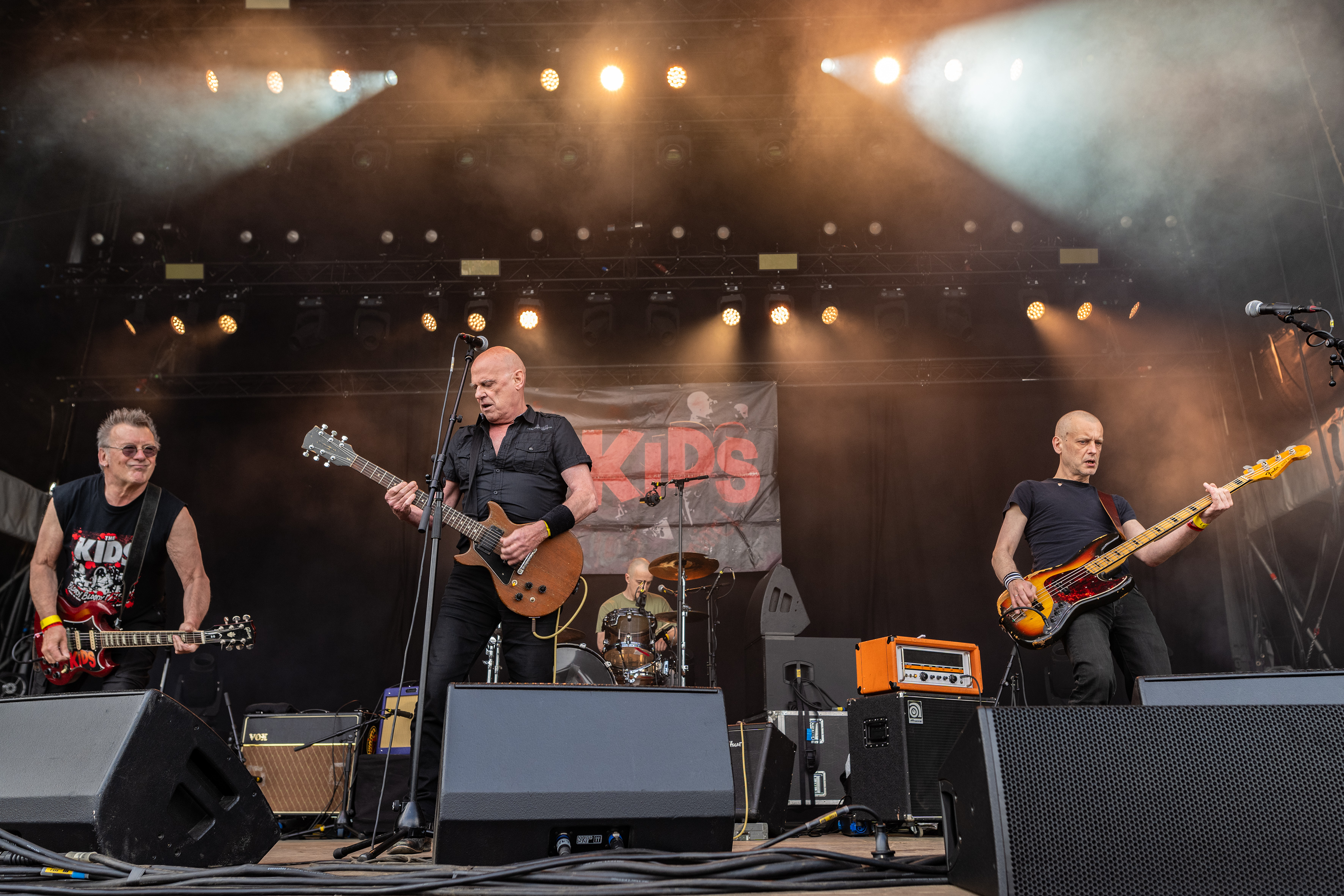
- The Kids during a 2023 concert

Background information
- Origin: Antwerp, Belgium
- Genre: Punk rock
- Years active: 1976–1985; 1996–present
- Members: Ludo Mariman; Danny De Haes; Luc van de Poel; Tim Jult
- Past members: Yves Vanlommel; Eddy de Haes

The Kids are a Belgian punk rock band formed in 1976. They are Belgium's best known punk band and best remembered for their songs "Fascist Cops" (1978) and "There Will Be No Next Time" (1981). The band broke up in 1985 but reunited in 1996 for the soundtrack recording of the Belgian film Dief (Thief). They have been together ever since, playing concerts around the world. Their last ever concert has been announced for 21 november 2026.

== History ==
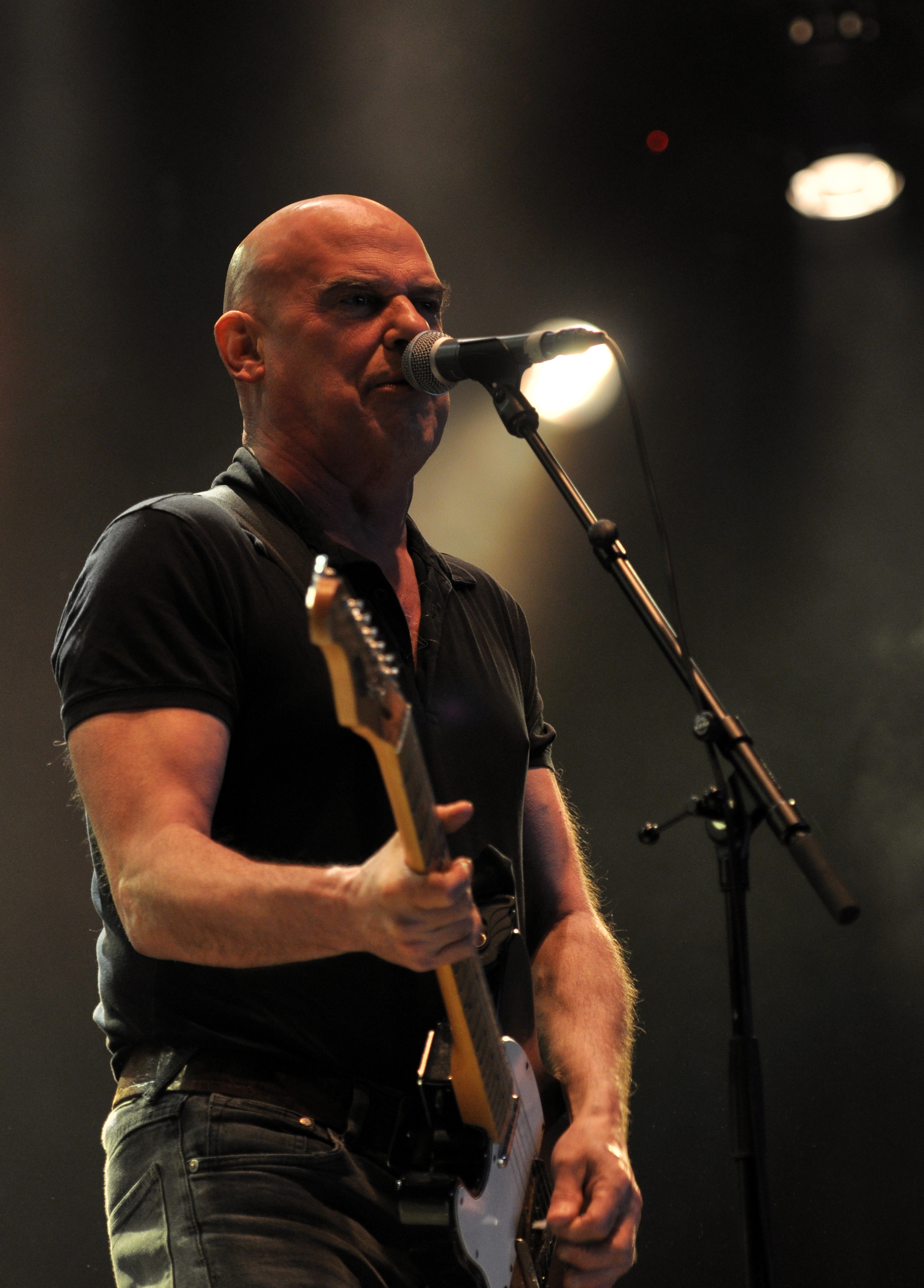
Ludo Mariman performing with The Kids at 2013 Groezrock

- 1976: Inspired by the upcoming punk wave, Ludo Mariman and the De Haes brothers formed The Kids. Their bass player, Danny de Haes, is only 12 at the time (and not allowed in at some of their own concerts).
- 1977: The Kids sign their first record contract with Phonogram. They play support acts for Iggy Pop and Patti Smith.
- 1978: Their first album The Kids is recorded, and guitarist Luc van de Poel joins the band. They play at the famous Jazz Bilzen festival. Eight months later the second album Naughty Kids is released.
- 1978–1984: The Kids play many concerts, win several Belgian polls, and record another 3 albums: Living in the 20th Century, Black Out (which includes their biggest Belgian hit "There Will Be No Next Time"), and a Live album, recorded with the Rolling Stones mobile studio.
- 1985: The Kids release Gotcha!, their final studio album, just to split up shortly after.
- 1996: The Kids reform and start touring again, playing concerts in France and Belgium, Italy, and Germany.
- 2004: The Kids play their first concert in the USA, at Southpaw in Brooklyn. A DVD of this sold-out show is released under the title The Kids: Live in New York.
- 2005: The Kids play their first Canadian tour and play at a festival in Austin, Texas.
- 2007: A box set collection including all previous the Kids albums is released.
- 2008: The Kids play at the Lokerse Feesten Festival with the Sex Pistols, the New York Dolls, and the Buzzcocks.
- 2008–2012: The kids play concerts in Canada, Japan, Spain, Switzerland, Holland, Germany, France, Italy, Sweden, Norway, etc.
- 2012: The band's line up changed, with Tim Jult as new drummer and Ief Vanlommel as new bassist.
- 2013: The Kids announce a US-Westcoast tour, including concerts in Portland, Seattle, San Francisco, Los Angeles, and San Diego.

== Band members ==
Original line-up

- Ludo Mariman – guitar, vocals
- Danny de Haes – bass
- Eddy de Haes – drums

Current line-up

- Ludo Mariman – guitar, vocals
- Danny De Haes – bass
- Luc van de Poel – guitar
- Tim Jult – drums
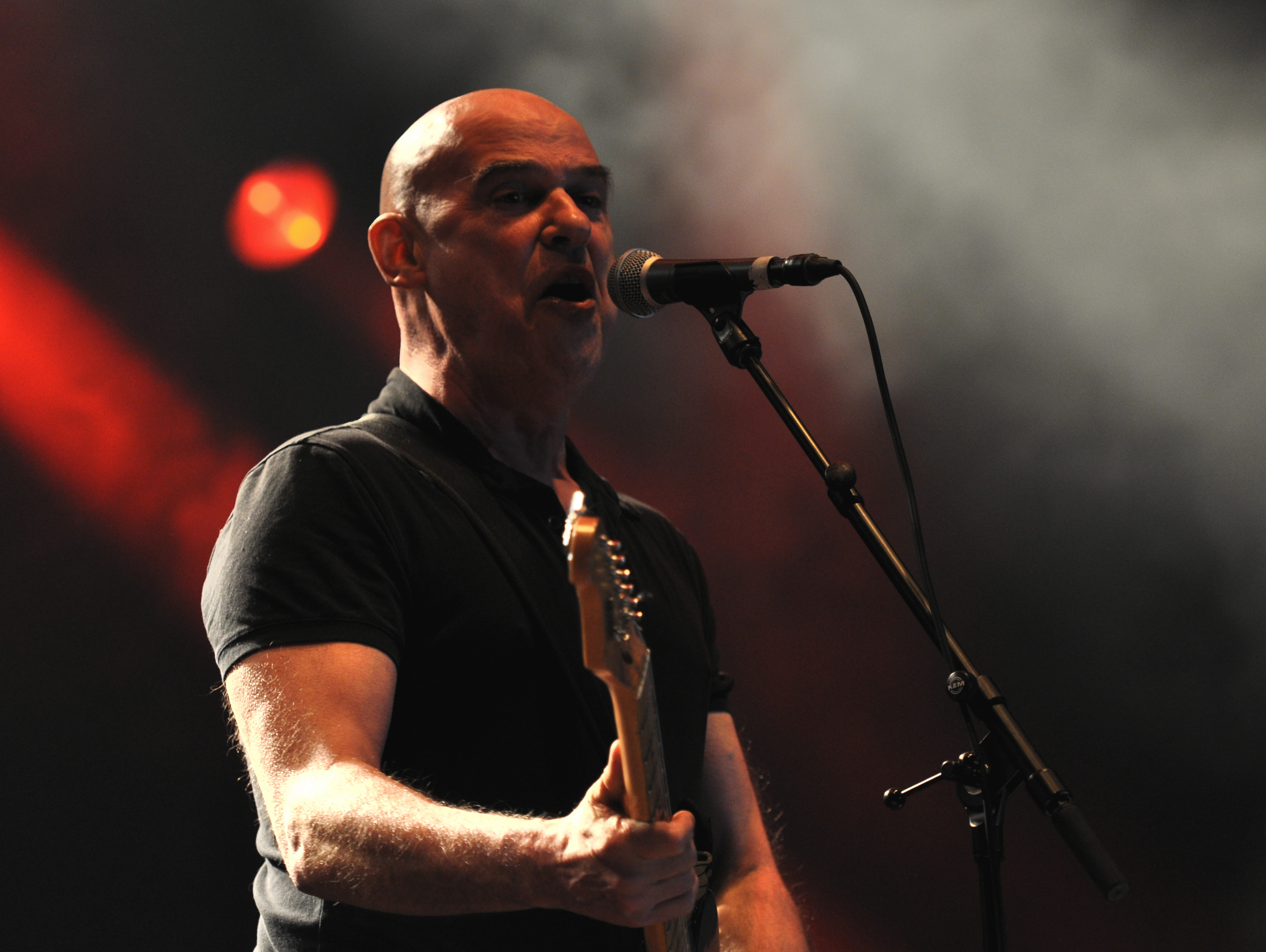
Ludo Mariman

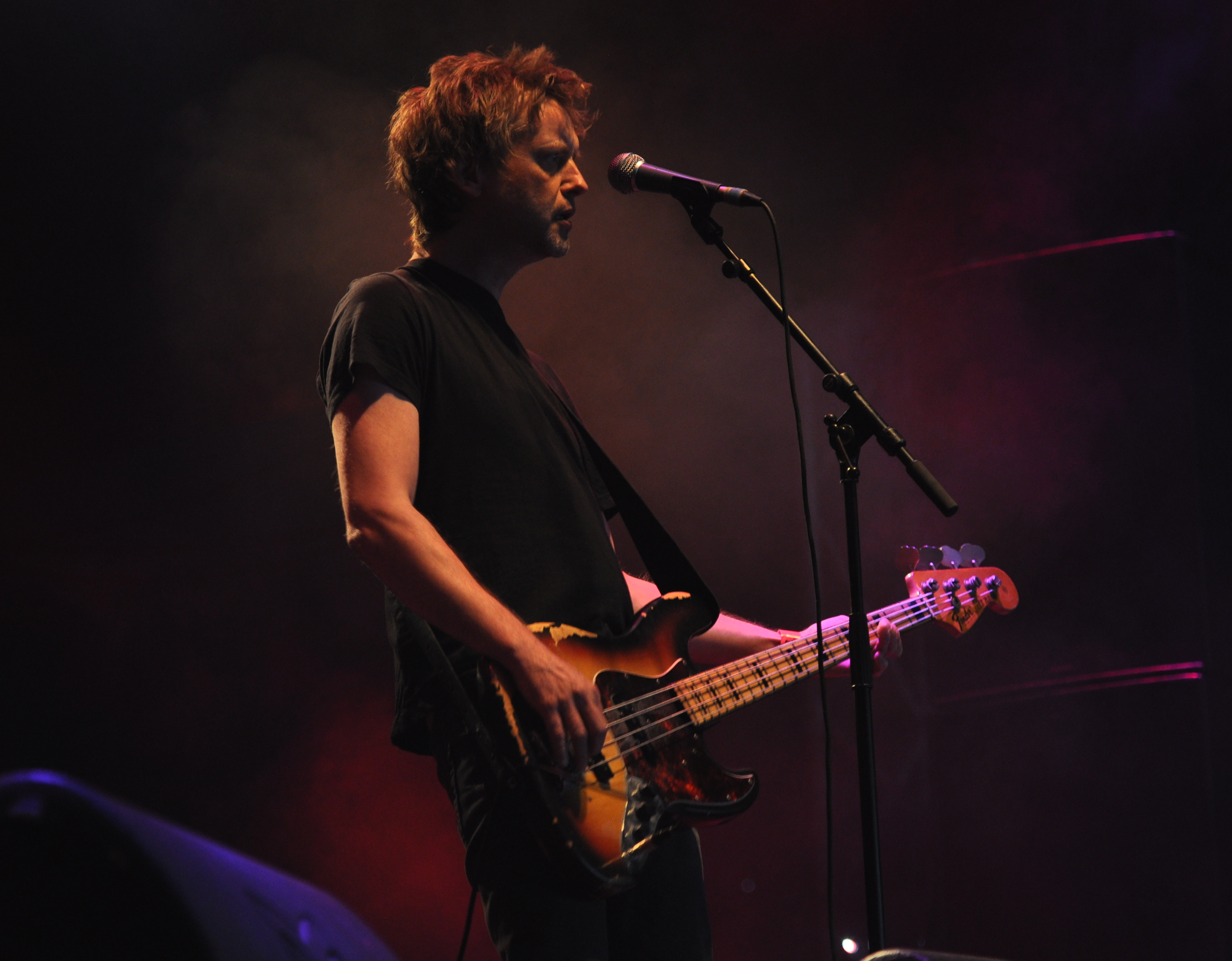
Yves Vanlommel

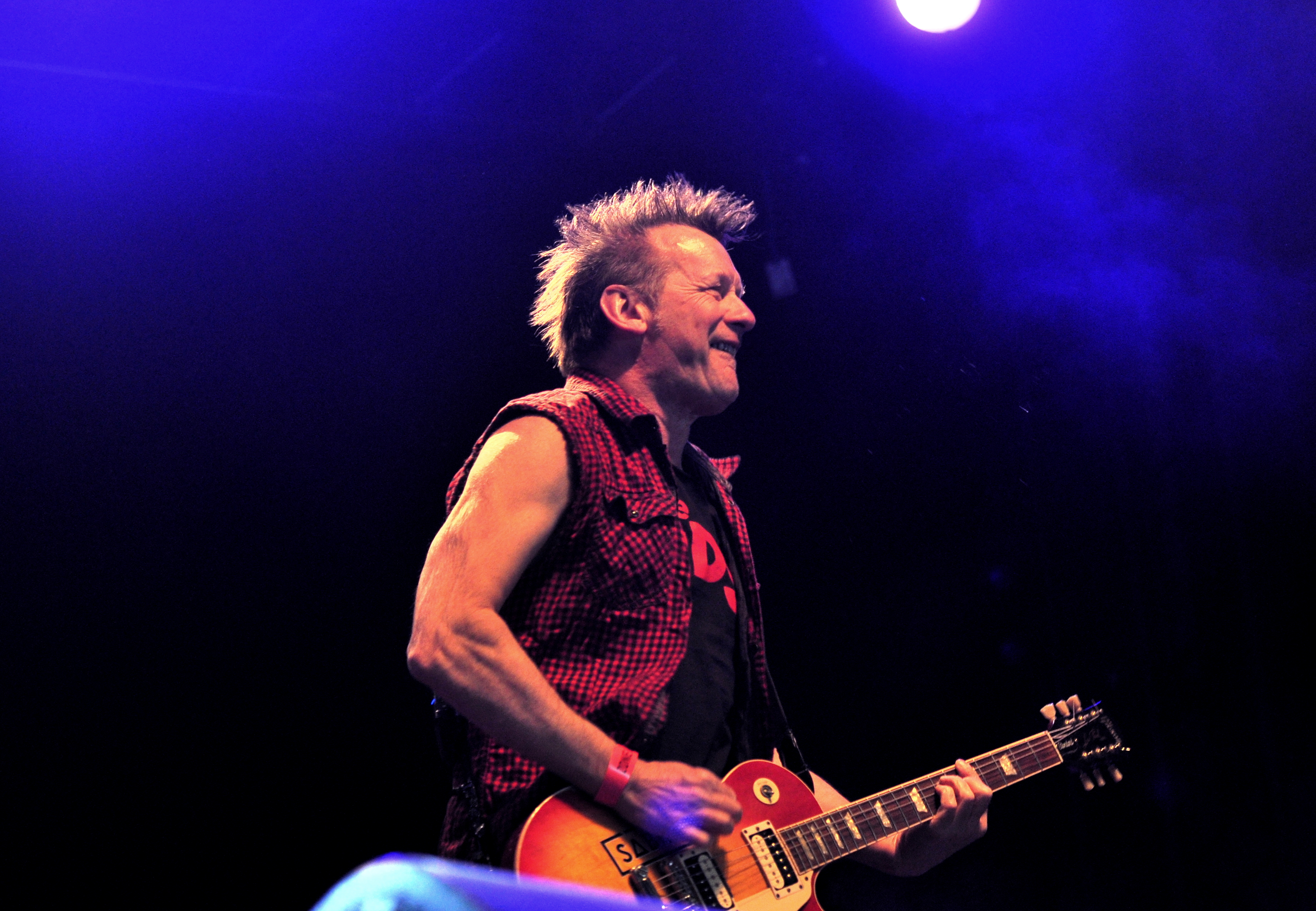
Luc van de Poel

== Discography ==
- 1978: The Kids
- 1978: Naughty Kids
- 1979: Living in the 20th Century
- 1981: Black Out
- 1982: If the Kids... (live)
- 1985: Gotcha!
- 2002: Flabbergasted! Live at AB
- 2004: The Kids: Live in New York (DVD)
- 2007: Anthology
