= Scott Tucker =

Scott Tucker may refer to:

- Scott Tucker (swimmer) (born 1976), American former swimmer
- Scott Tucker (businessman) (born 1962), American convicted racketeer, loan shark, fraudster, and money launderer
- Scott Tucker (conductor) (born 1976), American conductor
