= Scott Crumpecker =

American politician

Member-elect of the Missouri House of Representatives from the 149th district
- Assuming office January 6, 2027
- Succeeding: Donnie Brown

Personal details
- Party: Republican

Scott Crumpecker is an American politician of the Missouri Republican Party who is the representative-elect for the 149th district in the Missouri House of Representatives. He was elected in the 2026 general election.
