= Scooter Girl =

Scooter Girl may refer to

- Scooter Girl (comics), a comic miniseries by Chynna Clugston
- "Scooter Girl", a song by Shaun Ryder from his 2003 solo album, Amateur Night in the Big Top
