= Scootering =

Scootering may refer to:

- Dog scootering, a sport with dog-powered scooters
- Freestyle scootering, an action sport with human-powered scooters
- Scootering (British magazine), a motor scooter magazine

== See also ==
- Scooter (disambiguation)
