= Scott Cormode =

American historian and theologian

D. Scott Cormode is an American historian, theologian, and minister of the Presbyterian Church (USA), currently the Hugh De Pree Professor of Leadership Development at Fuller Theological Seminary. He was formerly academic dean from 2013 to 2015.

He studied computer engineering as an undergraduate at the University of California San Diego and received an M.Div. from Fuller Theological Seminary. Cormode earned his doctorate in religious history from Yale.

He was assistant dean for institutional research and George W. Butler Associate Professor of Church Administration and Finance at Claremont School of Theology, where he was also affiliated with the history faculty at Claremont Graduate University.

In 1998, Cormode received a Lilly Endowment grant that was used to organize the Academy of Religious Leadership, as part of the emergence of leadership and administration as a field of study in practical theology. He founded the Journal of Religious Leadership in 2001, and has edited it since.

R. Stephen Warner wrote that Cormode's contribution to Sacred Companies: Organizational Aspects of Religion and Religious Aspects of Organizations (1998) showed in a "fine chapter" how historians can contribute to the interdisciplinary study of non-profit organizations.

Cormode is author of Making Spiritual Sense: Christian Leaders as Spiritual Interpreters (2006) and The Innovative Church: How Leaders and Their Congregations Can Adapt in an Ever-Changing World (2020).
