= Scottie (disambiguation) =

Scottie, or Scottish Terrier, is a breed of dog.

Scottie may also refer to:

- Scottie (given name)
- Scottie (album), by organist Shirley Scott
- Scottie (horse) (1957–1981), a rodeo horse
- "Scottie", a track on the deluxe edition of the Lil Wayne album Tha Carter V

== See also ==
- Scotties, a facial tissue brand
- Scotties Tournament of Hearts, an annual Canadian women's curling tournament
- Scoti, an Irish tribe
