= Scott Martin =

Scott Martin may refer to:

== Sports ==
- Scott Martin (co-driver) (born 1981), British rallying co-driver
- Scott Martin (footballer) (born 1997), Scottish footballer (Hibernian FC)
- Scott Martin (thrower) (born 1982), Australian athlete in shot put and discus

== Politics ==
- Scott Martin (Oklahoma politician) (born 1971), Republican member of the Oklahoma House of Representatives
- Scott Martin (Pennsylvania politician), Republican member of the Pennsylvania Senate
