= Scotty Iseri =

American video game developer

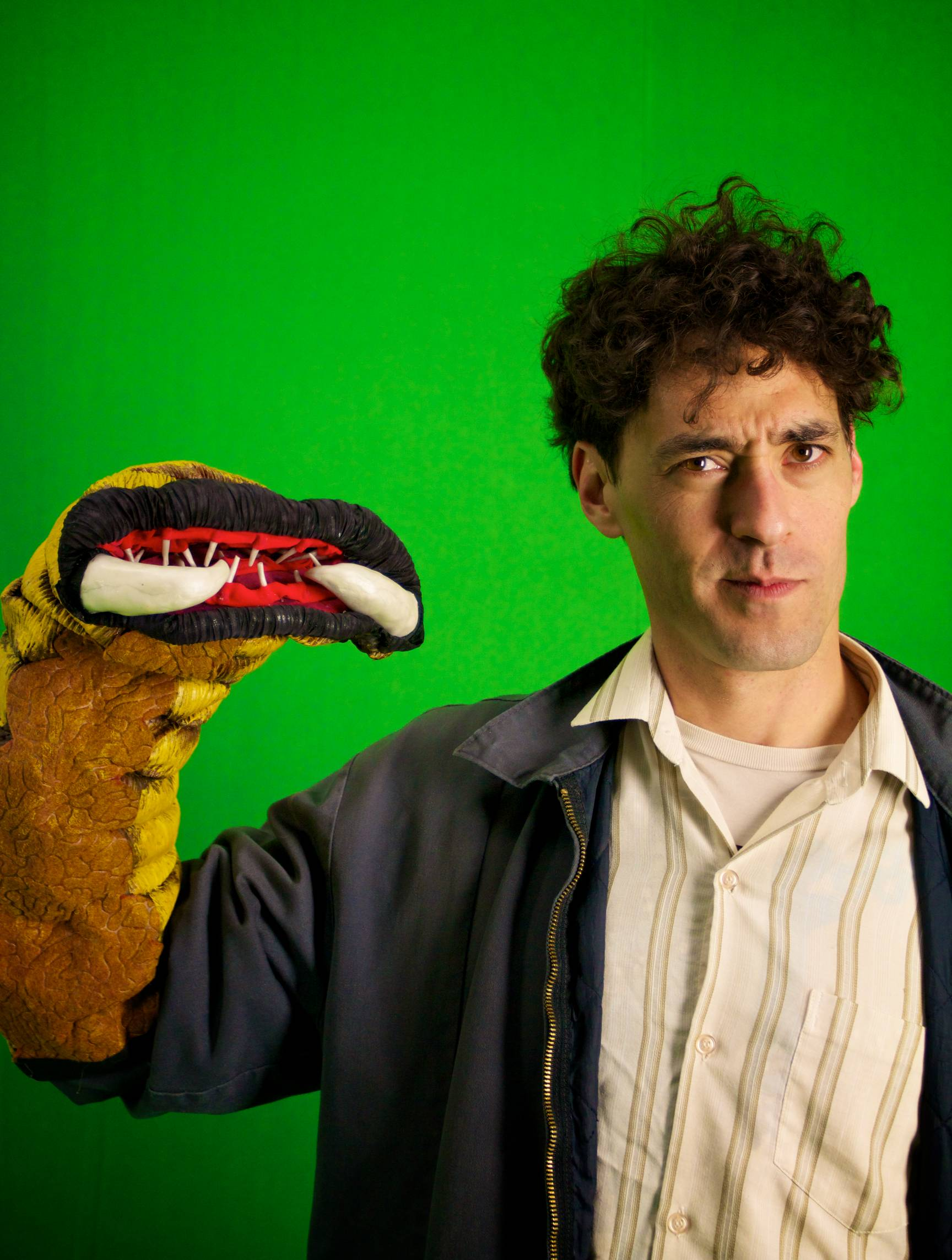
- Born: April 6, 1979 (age 47); Ontario, Oregon
- Education: Willamette University
- Occupations: Web series and mobile app creator
- Years active: 2001 – present
- Notable work: Scotty Got an Office Job, The Digits

Scotty Iseri (born April 6, 1979) is an American web series and mobile application creator and director, as well as a freelance sound designer, producer, and theater artist. Iseri's web series, Scotty Got an Office Job brought him to national prominence in which he secretly filmed the goings-on in his office job in Chicago. "Using a Flip camera and his laptop’s webcam, Iseri manages to get an impressive range of footage while on the clock...the series’ very existence is one that proves perhaps there are some people who are meant to wear grown-up pants in an office, and there are some people who aren’t. And for the latter, Scotty is an inspiration."

In 2010, Iseri, who is half-Japanese, received a fellowship with the Center for Asian American Media and in 2012 developed the app The Digits for elementary school children who are struggling with math and math concepts.

The web series enlists talent from the Pacific NW, specifically Portland, Oregon, and the curriculum of the show is designed for third and fourth graders, a time when "Math and science learning get harder at around age 8," he says. "So there's not much for children to watch."

Iseri currently is the creator and host of The Imagine Neighborhood podcast, produced by Committee for Children.

== Early career ==
An Ontario, Oregon, native, Iseri graduated from Willamette University in 2001 with a degree in theater, and moved to Chicago and pursued a freelance career as a sound designer for theater and radio. He also worked as a producer and contributing editor for Chicago Public Radio on a weekly show called Smart City Radio.

== The Paper Hat Game ==
Iseri also created the Paper Hat Game, an urban ARG played on public transit. In Chicago, he became known as the "Paper Hat Guy" after handing out newspaper hats to hundreds of train and bus riders. The game later inspired a toy theater piece by Duke University Professor Torry Bend. The show "The Paper Hat Game" toured nationally, and was nominated for a Drama Desk Award in 2016.

== The Digits ==
On November 16, 2012, Iseri's app The Digits became available in an iOS version to the App Store with its first episode entitled The Digits: Fraction Blast. The app features a 45-minute video and more than a dozen mini-games that teach a math curriculum focused specifically on fractions. "Unlike the majority of educational apps, says Iseri, The Digits follows the STEM (Science, Technology, Engineering and Math) curriculum and the app was also created under the guidance of a cirriculum [sic] designer and implemented by a 20-year veteran school teacher."

== The Imagine Neighborhood ==
Iseri currently hosts the podcast The Imagine Neighborhood, a podcast designed to help children develop their social and emotional skills. The podcast won the 2020 American Library Association Excellence in Early Learning Digital Media award. The show was nominated for Best Asian Hosted Podcast by the People's Choice Podcast Awards, and won a National Parenting Product Award in 2021.
