= Armand (singer) =

Dutch singer-songwriter (1946–2015)

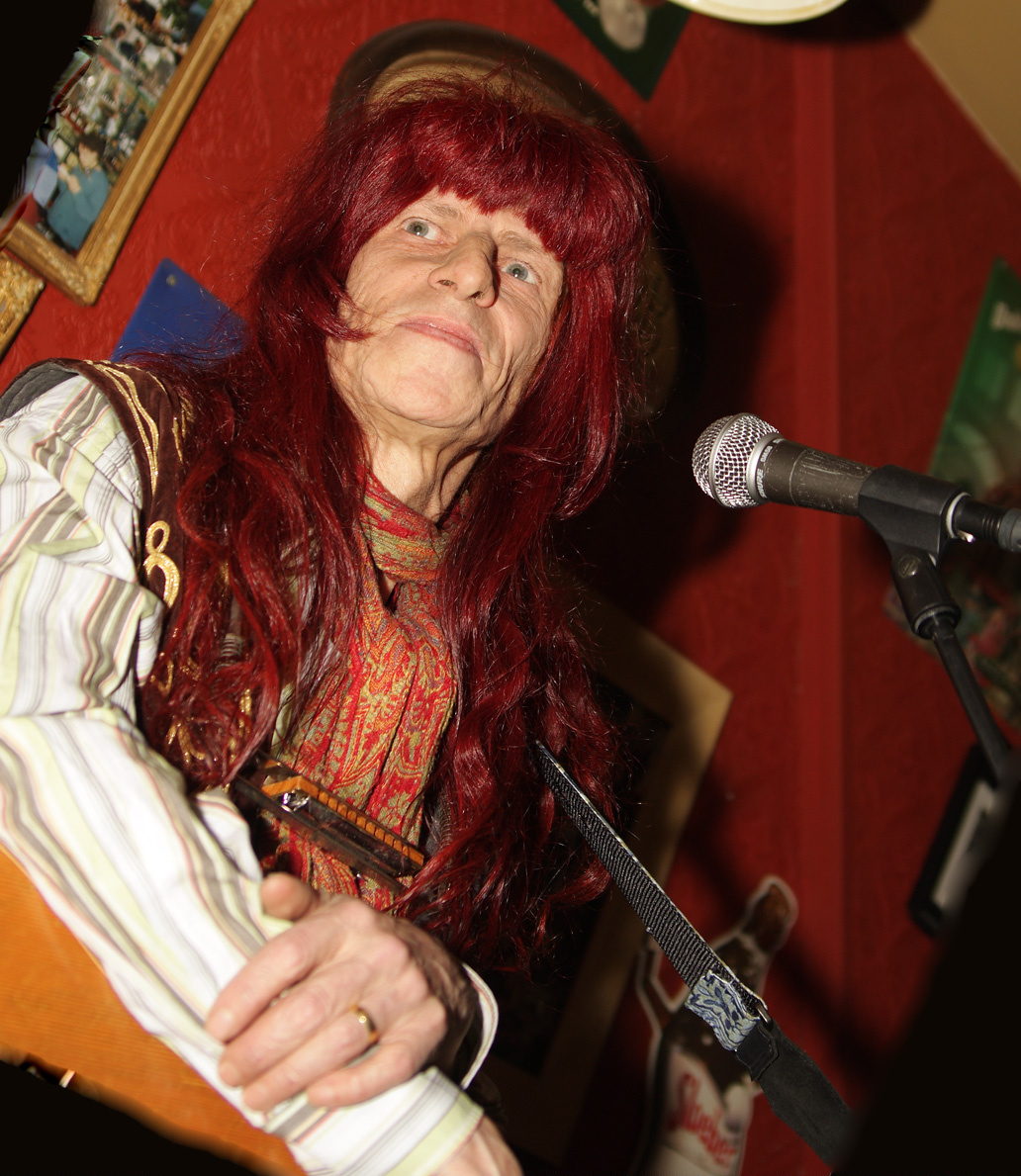
- Armand in 2009
- Born: Herman George van Loenhout; 10 April 1946; Eindhoven, The Netherlands
- Died: 19 November 2015 (aged 69); Eindhoven, The Netherlands
- Occupation: Protest singer

Herman George van Loenhout (10 April 1946 – 19 November 2015), better known as Armand, was a Dutch protest singer. His most famous song is "Ben ik te min" ("Am I not good enough?"). Armand came to the forefront during the hippie generation and was well known as an advocate of cannabis.

== Biography ==
His influences were Bob Dylan, Peter Seeger and Woody Guthrie. He started his musical career in the bands Splendour Boys, Shannon Boys and Les Gilets. He launched his first solo-record in 1965. "En nou ik" which flopped. His second single "En een van hen ben ik" made it to the "Tipparade". Then 3 months later, the B side ("Ben ik te min") began playing on the radio and became a national hit. Armands first album was released in 1967 and it stayed in the Dutch Top 40's for 14 weeks. In that same year the single "Blommenkinders" came out. This brought him in the Top40's, reaching number 19. From here on, the record label Philips refused to release "Lijpe Harrie", from where on Armand decided to write the debut song for Lenny Kuhr ("Laat maar schrijven"). Ten years later Armand released "Lijpe Harrie" after all.

Because Armand was a great advocate of legalizing soft drugs and Philips declined to publish lyrics about that subject, he transferred in 1970 to Telstar Records (then owned by Dutch singer Johnny Hoes). On the label Kilroy he released six albums in the period of 1971 to 1981. The albums contained many socially concerned lyrics, most of them inspired by the hippie ideology of the late 1960s. In 1990 he broke with the majors to give himself more artistic freedom. In 1994 he released "One of Eur Kind", which was only for sale at his gigs. In 1996 he celebrated his 50th birthday by releasing the compilation 50 jaar Armand. The album A Tribute to Armand/50 years followed. On 14 December 2011, Armand was the first Dutch hippie artist to participate in the TV show hosted by Ali B called Op Volle Toeren. He recorded his own version of the song "Straattaal", originated by rapper Nina, who-in turn-recorded her version of Armand's song "Ben ik te min".

In 2012, Armand began a collaboration with singer-songwriter Lucky Fonz III and Dave von Raven (singer for The Kik), both fans of his, and in June 2015 Armand & The Kik released an album with adaptations of Armand's lesser-known songs, followed by a Dutch tour.

Armand died in Eindhoven on 19 November 2015 of pneumonia, at the age of 69.
