= Scott McGregor =

Scott McGregor may refer to a person in:

== Business ==
- Scott A. McGregor (born 1956), American technology executive and philanthropist

== Entertainment ==
- Scott McGregor (actor) (born 1981), Australian model, Neighbours actor and TV presenter
- Scott McGregor (television presenter) (born 1957), Australian actor, television presenter and railway enthusiast
- Scott MacGregor (art director) (1914–1971), British art director

== Sports ==
- Scott McGregor (left-handed pitcher) (born 1954), American Major League Baseball player who pitched for the Baltimore Orioles
- Scott McGregor (basketball) (born 1976), Australian basketball player
- Scott McGregor (right-handed pitcher) (born 1986), American minor league baseball player

== Fiction ==
- Scott McGregor, fictional character in the film 10 Years (2011)
- Scotty McGregor, fictional character in the film The Crazies (2010)

== See also ==
- McGregor W. Scott (born 1962), U.S. lawyer
