= Scott Wolf (disambiguation) =

Scott Wolf is an actor.

Scott Wolf(f) or Wolfe may also refer to:

- J. Scott Wolff, politician
- Scotty Wolfe (1908–1997), American Baptist minister
- Scott Wolfe (American football), player for Australia national American football team

== See also ==
- Scott/Wolfe, songwriting team
