= Scott James =

Scott James may refer to:

- Scotty James (born 1994), Australian snowboarder
- Scott James (writer) (born 1962), American journalist and author
- Scott James, ring name of American professional wrestler Scott Armstrong (born 1961)
