= Scott Brown (American football) =

American football coach

Coaching career (HC unless noted)
- 1926: Kentucky State

Head coaching record
- Overall: 0–4

Scott Brown was an American coach. He was the third head football coach at Kentucky State University in Frankfort, Kentucky and he held that position for the 1926 season. His career coaching record at Kentucky State was 0–4.
