= Scott Young =

Scott Young may refer to:

== Sportspeople ==
- Scott Young (American football) (born 1981), American football guard for the Denver Broncos of the National Football League
- Scott Young (ice hockey, born 1965), retired Canadian professional ice hockey defenceman
- Scott Young (ice hockey, born 1967), retired American professional ice hockey right winger
- Scott Young (Welsh footballer) (born 1976), Welsh football player
- Scott Young (Scottish footballer) (born 1977), Scottish footballer and manager

== Others ==
- Scott Young (politician) (born 1961), mayor of Port Coquitlam, British Columbia
- Scott Young (writer) (1918–2005), Canadian writer and sports journalist
- Scot Young (1962–2014), British businessman
