= Scott Patterson (artist) =

American street artist (1968–2016)

Scott Patterson (1968–2016), also known as The Me Nobody Knows or TMNK, was an American street artist. He was based in Miami, Florida and was the subject of a documentary by Rico James, entitled Nobody was Here.

The street artist who became known as TMNK grew up in East Orange, New Jersey. He began his work as an artist in New York in 2007, after leaving a lucrative career in advertising. In 2010, his solo exhibition Urban Derivatives, was staged at the Galerie Galleberg in Norway. His work, "Miss Liar: Brown Bag Series," (2016) is in the permanent collection of the Fleming Museum at the University of Vermont in Burlington.
