= Scott Walker =

Scott Walker may refer to:

- Scott Walker (singer) (1943–2019), American singer
  - Scott Walker: 30 Century Man, a 2006 documentary about the singer
- Scott Walker (politician) (born 1967), American politician; 45th Governor of Wisconsin
- Scott Walker (judge) (born 1953), American judge
- Scott Walker (boxer) (1969–2004), American professional boxer
- Scott Walker (bobsleigh) (born 1970), Australian bobsledder
- Scott Walker (ice hockey) (born 1973), Canadian professional ice hockey player and head coach of the Guelph Storm
- Scott Walker (footballer) (born 1975), Scottish footballer, played for St. Mirren, Dunfermline Athletic and Hartlepool United
- Scott Walker, one of the two men convicted of the murder of Jody Dobrowski in South London in 2005
- Scott Walker (director), New Zealand director of The Frozen Ground
- Scott Walker, Republican Party nominee for the 2018 United States House of Representatives election in Delaware

== See also ==
- Scott Tallon Walker, an Irish architecture firm founded by Michael Scott, Ronnie Tallon and Robin Walker
- Walker Scott, a department store chain in Southern California, United States
