= Scott Neslin =

American economist

Scott Neslin is an American economist. As of 2017 he was the Albert Wesley Frey Professor at Tuck School of Business, Dartmouth College.

Neslin received a PhD from the MIT Sloan School of Management in 1978.

Neslin is an Associate Editor for the Journal of Marketing. He sits on the editorial boards of the Journal of Marketing Research, Marketing Letters, Journal of Interactive Marketing, and the Journal of the Academy of Marketing Science.

== Books ==
- Sales Promotion: Concepts, Methods, and Strategies with Robert C. Blattberg
- Database Marketing: Analyzing and Managing Customers with Robert C. Blattberg and Byung-Do Kim
