= Scotty =

Scotty may refer to:

== People ==
=== Given name or nickname ===
- Scotty Alcock (1885–1973), American baseball player
- Scotty Allan (1867–1941), American dog musher, businessman and politician
- Scotty Anderson (born 1979), American National Football League player
- Scotty Baesler (born 1941), American politician
- Scotty Bahrke (born 1985), American freestyle skier specializing in aerial skiing
- Scottie Barnes (born 2001), American basketball player
- Scotty Barnhart (born 1964), American jazz trumpeter
- Scotty Barr (1886–1934), American baseball player
- Scotty Beckett (1929–1968), American actor
- Scotty Bierce (1896–1982), American National Football League player and coach
- Scotty Bloch (1925–2018), American actress
- Scotty Boman (born 1962), American politician
- Scotty Bowers (1923–2019), United States Marine and Hollywood pimp
- Scotty Bowman (born 1933), Canadian retired National Hockey League head coach
- Scotty Bowman (baseball) (1885–1912), American baseball player in the Negro leagues
- Ralph "Scotty" Bowman (1911–1990), Canadian ice hockey player
- Scotty Bozek (1950–2022), American épée fencer
- William Bryce (1888–1963), Scottish-born Canadian politician
- Scotty Cain (1920–1994), American racing driver
- Scotty Cameron (ice hockey) (1921–1993), Canadian hockey player
- Scotty Campbell (born 1984), American politician
- Scotty Cannon, American dragster driver
- Scotty Cranmer (born 1987), American BMX rider
- Scotty Crockett (born 1979), American stock car racing driver
- Scottie Cuevas (born 1965), American politician
- Scotty Davidson (1891–1915), Canadian ice hockey player and soldier
- Scott Davis (Scotty D) (born 1975), American songwriter and producer
- Scotty Emerick (born 1973), American country music singer-songwriter
- Scottie Fitzgerald (1921–1986), American journalist and daughter of F. Scott Fitzgerald
- Winston Fitzgerald (1914–1987), Canadian fiddler
- Scottie McKenzie Frasier (1884–1964), American teacher, writer, lecturer, suffragist
- Scotty Fox (director), American pornographic film director
- Scotty Glacken (1944–2006), American football quarterback and college head coach
- Scotty Gomez (born 1979), American ice hockey player and coach
- Scottie Graham (born 1969), American football player
- Scotty Granger (born 1987), American singer-songwriter
- Maryscott (Scotty) Greenwood, American corporate director and specialist in Canada–U.S. relations
- Scotty Hamilton (1921–1976), American basketball player and coach
- Scotty Hard, Canadian producer and musician
- Scottie Hazelton (born 1973), American football coach
- Scotty Holt, American jazz bassist
- Scotty Hopson (born 1989), American basketball player
- Scottie Nell Hughes (born 1980), American journalist, news anchor, and political commentator
- Scotty Ingerton (1886–1956), American baseball player
- Scotty Iseri (born 1979), American web series and mobile application creator and director
- Scottie James (born 1996), American basketball player
- Scotty James (born 1994), Australian snowboarder
- Scotty Jones (fl. 1911), American criminal and member of the Gas House Gang
- Scotty Kilmer (born 1953), American YouTuber and auto mechanic
- Scotty Klopfenstein, American musician and former member of Reel Big Fish
- Scotty Lago (born 1987), American snowboarder
- Scotty Leavenworth (born 1990), American actor
- Scottie Lewis (born 2000), American professional basketball player
- Scottie Lindsey (born 1996), American basketball player
- Scottie Mayfield (born 1950 or 1951), American businessman
- Scotty Mattraw (1880–1946), American actor
- Scotty McClymont (1892–1974), New Zealand rugby league footballer
- Scotty McCreery (born 1993), American country music singer
- Scotty McGee (born 1986), American National Football League player
- Scotty McKnight (born 1988), American media executive and former National Football League player
- Scotty McLennan (born 1948), American Unitarian Universalist minister, lawyer and senior administrator at Stanford University
- Scotty Miller (born 1997), American National Football League player
- Scottie Montgomery (born 1978) American football coach and former player
- Scotty Moore (1931–2016), American guitarist, one of Elvis Presley's backing musicians
- Scotty Moorhead (1966–1997), American singer-songwriter and guitarist
- Ann Moray (1909–1981), novelist and singer
- Scotty Morrison (1930–2026), Canadian former National Hockey League referee
- Scotty Morrison (broadcaster) (born 1970), New Zealand broadcaster and academic
- Scotty Moylan (1916–2010), Guamanian businessman
- Scotty Munro (1917–1975), Canadian ice hockey coach
- Scotty Neill (1895–1963), American football and baseball player
- Scotty Nguyen (born 1962), Vietnamese-American poker player
- Scotty Olson (born 1968), Canadian boxer
- Scotty Pearson, New Zealand drummer and member of Elemeno P
- James "Scotty" Philip (1858–1911), American rancher and politician
- Scottie Phillips (born 1997), American football player
- Scottie Pippen (born 1965), American basketball player
- Scotty Pippen Jr. (born 2000), American basketball player, son of the above
- Scotty Plummer (c. 1961–1992), American banjoist
- Scotty Probasco (1928–2015), American heir, businessman and philanthropist
- Scotty Rankine (1909–1995), Canadian track and field athlete
- Scotty Ratliff (born 1943), American politician
- Scotty Reston (1909–1995), American journalist
- Scottie Reynolds (born 1987), American basketball player
- Scotty Robb (1908–1969), American baseball umpire
- Scotty Robertson (1930–2011), American basketball coach
- Scotty Sadzoute (born 1998), French footballer
- Scottie Scheffler (born 1996), American professional golfer
- Scotty Schulhofer (1926–2006), American Hall of Fame Thoroughbred racehorse trainer
- Harold "Scotty" Scott, American soul singer and member of the Temprees
- Kermit Scott (musician) (died 2002), American jazz tenor saxophonist
- Wallace "Scotty" Scott, American rhythm and blues singer and member of the Whispers
- Scottie Slayback (1901–1979), American baseball player
- Scotty Smith (1845–1919), South African criminal
- Scotty Steagall (1929–2001), American basketball player
- Scotty Stokes, American politician
- Scotty Stirling (1928/1929–2015), American sports executive and sportswriter
- Scotty Stoneman (1932–1973), American bluegrass and country fiddler
- Scottie Thompson (actress) (born 1981), American actress
- Scottie Thompson (basketball) (born 1993), Filipino basketball player
- Scotty Thurman (born 1974), American basketball player and assistant coach
- Scottie Upshall (born 1983), Canadian ice hockey player
- Scottie Vines (born 1979), American football player
- Scottie Vines (high jumper) (born 2005), American high jumper
- Scotty Walden (born 1989), American football coach
- Scotty Washington (born 1997), American football player
- Scotty Joe Weaver (1986–2004), American murder victim
- Scotty Whitelaw (1927–2016), American baseball and basketball coach
- Scottie Wilbekin (born 1993), Turkish-American basketball player
- Scotty Wilkins, American punk rock singer
- Scottie Wilson, Scottish outsider artist born Louis or Lewis Freeman (1888–1972)
- Scotty Wolfe (1908–1997), American Baptist minister

=== Stage name ===
- Scotty (reggae vocalist), Jamaican reggae singer born David Scott (1950–2003)
- Scott Greene Wiseman (1908–1981), half of the Lulu Belle and Scotty country music duo
- Scotty ATL (born 1985), American hip hop artist
- Scottie Beam, American digital producer and model Deanii Andrea Scott (born 1990)
- Scotty Boy, stage name of American DJ and record producer Scott Schroer
- Scottie McClue, shock jock on-air radio persona of Colin Lamont (born 1956)
- Scotty T, British reality TV personality born Scott Robert Timlin (born 1988)

=== Ring name ===
- Scotty 2 Hotty, ring name of American firefighter and professional wrestler Scott Ronald Garland (born 1973)
- Scotty Charisma, ring name of American professional wrestler Scott Wright (born 1977)
- Scotty Flamingo, ring name of American professional wrestler Scott Levy (born 1964)
- Scotty Goldman, ring name of American professional wrestler Scott Colton (born 1980)
- Scotty Mac, ring name of Canadian professional wrestler Scott Schnurr (born 1978)
- Scotty McGhee, ring name of British professional wrestler Garfield Portz (born 1959)
- Scotty Riggs, ring name of American professional wrestler Scott Antol (born 1971)

== Fictional characters ==
- Scotty (Star Trek), in the Star Trek universe
- Scotty Baldwin, on the American soap opera General Hospital and the spinoff Port Charles
- Scotty Grainger, on the American soap opera The Young and the Restless
- Scotty Marshall, main character in the movie (S)KiDS made by the pop-punk band Rare Americans
- Hornet (Scotty McDowell), in the Marvel Universe
- Scotty Parker, the female main protagonist in the film Silent Scream
- Scottie McTerrier, in the Donald Duck universe
- Scotty Valens (Cold Case), on the American crime drama television series Cold Case
- Scotty Wandell, on the television series Brothers & Sisters
- Scotty Wilson, a recurring character in the American fantasy drama television series Highway to Heaven

== Science ==
- Scotty (dinosaur), a nickname for the Tyrannosaurus rex fossil discovered in Saskatchewan, Canada in 1991

== See also ==
- Scoti, an ancient Irish tribe
- Scotti (disambiguation)
- Skottie Young (born 1978), American comic book artist, children's book illustrator and writer
- Scottee, entertainer and performance artist
