= Scott & White Sleep Disorders Center =

US research organization

Scott & White Sleep Disorders Center is a modern center of research into sleep disorders in Temple, Texas. Its laboratory activity focuses on polysomnography. It holds accreditation from the American Academy of Sleep Medicine.

== Sources ==
- Scott & White Sleep Disorders Center website
- Scott & White Memorial Hospital
- Perfect Sleep Infographic
