= Scooter (Belgian band) =

Belgian pop band (1979–1983)

- Pit Verlinde, Herwig Duchateau, Piet Van Den Heuvel, Jo Duchateau and Jan Fraeyman

Background information
- Origin: Antwerp, Belgium
- Genres: New wave, rock, pop
- Years active: 1979–1983
- Label: Ariola
- Past members: Piet Van Den Heuvel; Jan Verheyen; Pit Verlinde; Jo Duchateau; Herwig Duchateau; Jan Fraeyman

Scooter was a Belgian pop band from Antwerp, that started in 1979 as Scooter on the Road. In 1981, they released the singles "Tattoo Turkey" and "Peppermint Girl". Due to guitarist Jan Fraeyman suffering from terminal illness he was replaced by Bert Decorte (from the Misters). Sadly, shortly after the release of their debut album One by One (1981), guitarist Jan Fraeyman died.

Scooter scored a hit in Belgium with "You (Don't Want to Be Number One)" and won the Summerhit of 1981 award, an annual prize awarded by the Flemish broadcaster Radio 2.

The album One by One was produced by the drummer of the band, Herwig Duchateau, who was later successful as the producer of bands like the Bet, Schmutz, Won Ton Ton, and the Machines.

Scooter, now with guitarist Jan Verheyen after Bert Decorte left the band, released two more albums: Charm and Oblivion with American-sounding songs such as "Will I Ever Recover from You" (1982), "Stand Out" (1982) and "Minute by Minute" (1983). In 1982, shortly after the release of Charm, keyboard player Pit Verlinde left the band. Duchateau died in 2018.

== Members ==
- Piet Van Den Heuvel - vocals
- Jan Verheyen - guitar
- Pit Verlinde - keyboards
- Herwig Duchateau - drums

Past members

- Jan Fraeyman - guitar
- Bert Decorte - guitar

== Discography ==
=== Albums ===
Studio albums

- One by One (Ariola, 1981)
- Charm (Ariola, 1982)
- Oblivion (Ariola, 1983)

Compilation albums

- Scooter Master Serie (Polydor, 1997)

=== Singles ===
- "Tattoo Turkey" (1981)
- "Peppermint Girl" (1981)
- "You" (1981)
- "Will I Ever Recover from You" (1982)
- "Stand Out" (1982)
- "Minute by Minute" (1983)
