= Scooter (nickname) =

Scooter is a nickname of:

- Scooter Barry (born 1966), American former basketball player
- Scooter Berry (born 1986), professional American football player
- Scooter Braun or Brown (born 1981), American talent manager, businessman, and promoter
- Lloyd L. Burke (1924–1999), U.S. Army soldier awarded the Medal of Honor
- Scooter Gennett (born 1990), American baseball player
- Scooter Jackson, American football player
- Scooter LaForge (born 1971), American painter
- Scooter Lee (born 1957), American singer-songwriter
- Scooter Libby (born 1950), former adviser to U.S. Vice President Dick Cheney
- Scooter Lowry (1919–1989), American child actor
- Scooter Magruder (born 1988), American YouTube personality, actor, comedian, and new media consultant
- Scooter McCrae, American director
- Scooter McCray (born 1960), American professional basketball player
- Ray McLean (1915–1964), American football player and coach
- Scooter Molander (born 1966), American football player
- Scooter Page (born 1976), American musician and songwriter
- Scooter Park (born 1966), American politician
- Phil Rizzuto (1917–2007), American Hall-of-Fame Major League Baseball shortstop and sports announcer
- Eddie Tucker (born 1966), American former Major League Baseball catcher
- Scooter Vaughan (born 1989), American ice hockey player
- Scooter Ward (born 1970), American musician, lead singer of the rock band Cold
