= Johan Verminnen =

Belgian singer (born 1951)

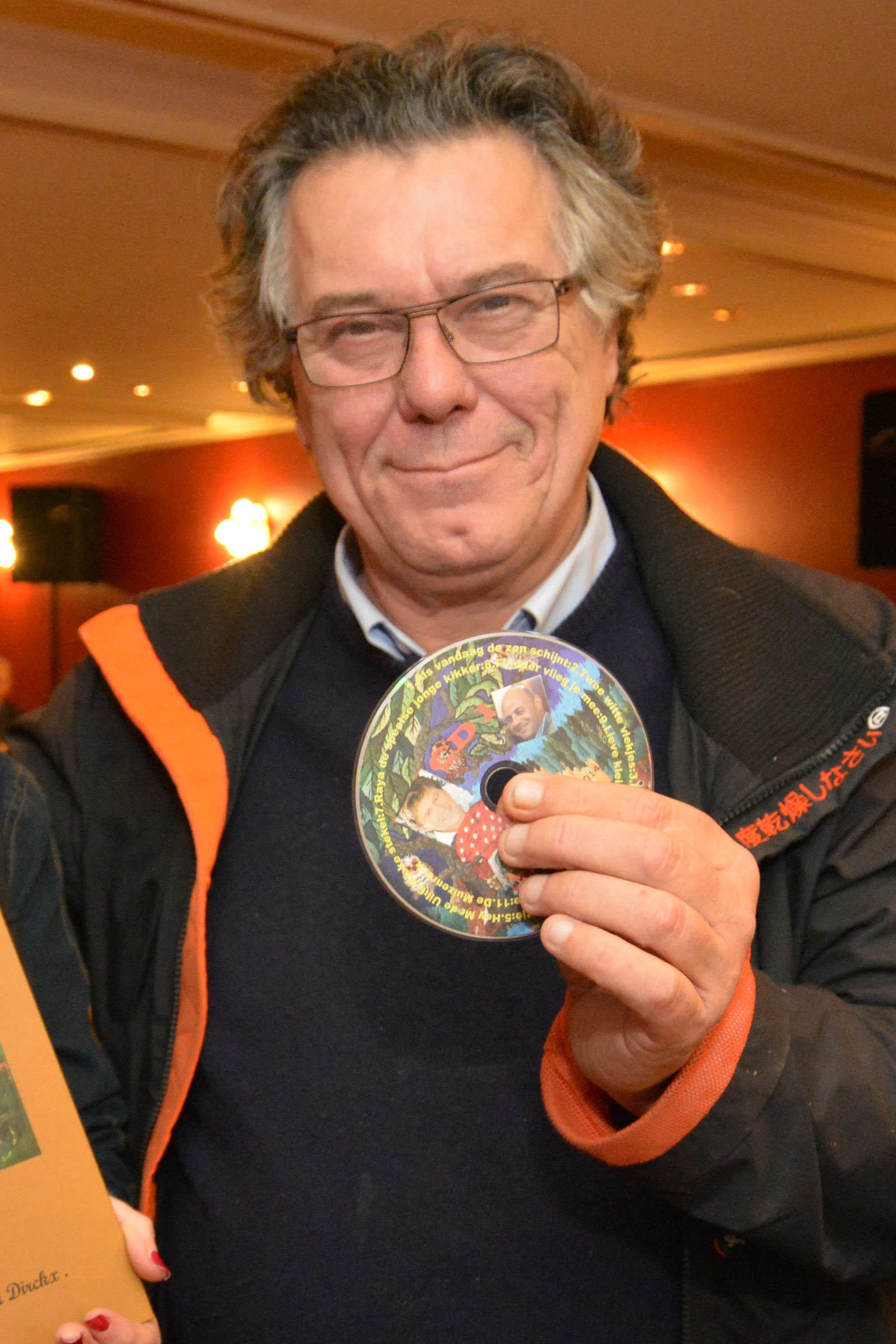
.Johan Verminnen in 2014

Johan Maurits Verminnen (born 22 May 1951 in Wemmel, Belgium) is a Belgian singer.

== Discography ==
- 2025 De Laatste Ronde (Album)
- 2019 En Daarna ga ik Vissen (Album)
- 2016 Tussen een Glimlach en een Traan (Album)
- 2014 Stemmen (Album)
- 2009 Solozeiler (Album)
- 2007 Over Mensen, Boten en Steden (Album)
- 2005 Hartklop
- 2003 Tegenlicht (Album)
- 2001 Swingen tot Morgenvroeg
- 1999 Vroeger en Later
- 1999 Het beste van Johan Verminnen
- 1998 Marin d'eaux douces
- 1996 Suiker en zout
- 1994 Alles leeft
- 1993 Zeven levens
- 1991 Volle maan
- 1989 Mooie Dagen - 20 Jaar Liedjes (Album)
- 1987 Traag is mooi
- 1984 Melancholie
- 1983 Tweemaal woordwaarde
- 1981 Ik voel me goed
- 1979 Als mijn gitaar me helpt
- 1977 Live
- 1976 Stilte als refrein
- 1975 Verminnen Verzameld
- 1974 Elle chante na na na
- 1973 Ze zingt nanana
- 1970 Johan Verminnen
