= At the Vortex =

Live album by Evan Parker, Barry Guy, and Paul Lytton
- Released: 1998
- Recorded: June 26, 1996
- Venues: The Vortex, London
- Genre: Free jazz
- Length: 1:18:44
- Labels: Emanem Records; 4022

Evan Parker, Barry Guy, and Paul Lytton chronology
Natives and Aliens (1997)	At the Vortex (1998)	After Appleby (2000)

At the Vortex is a live album by saxophonist Evan Parker, bassist Barry Guy, and drummer Paul Lytton. It was recorded on June 26, 1996, at The Vortex in London, and was released by Emanem Records in 1998.

In his liner notes, recording engineer Martin Davidson stated that the recording was made before a "large enthusiastic audience," and noted: "Such an audience generally feeds-back to the musicians, spurring them on to even greater heights than usual, as happened on this occasion, resulting in music that is more outgoing than would probably occur in a studio situation."

== Reception ==
Professional ratings
Review scores
Source	Rating
AllMusic	4.5/5 stars
The Penguin Guide to Jazz	4/4 stars

In a review for AllMusic, François Couture called the album "an essential recording," and wrote: "There is no shortage of albums by this band, but At the Vortex ranks as one of, if not downright, its strongest recording. Why? Because it was done in perfect conditions, with all musicians in astonishing shape, on home court, so to speak... The strength, the inspiration, the spirit, the simple joy of playing together: That's what this music is all about... Strongly and heartily recommended."

The authors of The Penguin Guide to Jazz awarded the album a full 4 stars, and stated: "Those who were there still talk about this mid-summer encounter at North London's 'listening jazz club'. Those who weren't will probably have tired of hearing about it and will be relieved that they too can now sample this extraordinary session."

Writing for All About Jazz, Robert Spencer commented: "This was one great night for all three: Both sets are tapestries of moods and textbook examples of how free playing can remain fresh and imaginative. For the attentive listener, At the Vortex will become one of this deservedly celebrated trio's most rewarding recordings."

Peter Margasak of the Chicago Reader singled out Lytton's playing for praise, noting that he "contributes a frenetic sprawl of metallic clangs, crashes, thwacks, and patter, shifting from violent to delicate in a flash and perpetually driving the others into unexpected territory."

== Track listing ==
1. "At the Vortex (First Set)" – 38:14
2. "At the Vortex (Second Set)" – 40:21

== Personnel ==
- Evan Parker – tenor saxophone, soprano saxophone
- Barry Guy – bass
- Paul Lytton – drums, percussion, cymbal
