= Rocket Science (Rocket Science album) =

Live album by Rocket Science
- Released: 2013
- Recorded: May 25, 2012
- Venue: Vortex Jazz Club, London
- Genre: Jazz
- Length: 57:33
- Label: More Is More

Evan Parker chronology
Live at Maya Recordings Festival (2013)	Rocket Science (2013)	What/If/They Both Could Fly (2013)

Peter Evans chronology
Zebulon (2013)	Rocket Science (2013)	Destination:Void (2014)

Rocket Science is the eponymous debut album by the collaborative quartet assembled by trumpeter Peter Evans and featuring British saxophonist Evan Parker, pianist Craig Taborn and computer musician Sam Pluta. It was recorded live at the Vortex in London, at the start of the quartet's first tour which then visited the Bimhuis in Amsterdam and the Moers Festival in Germany. Evans recorded Scenes in the House of Music with the Parker-Guy-Lytton trio, and is a member of Parker's Electro-Acoustic Ensemble. Taborn played piano in Parker's Transatlantic Art Ensemble which recorded Boustrophedon. Pluta is a member of the Peter Evans Quintet that recorded Ghosts.

== Reception ==
Professional ratings
Review scores
Source	Rating
All About Jazz	4/5 stars

In a review for All About Jazz, Mark Corroto states "With a unit like Rocket Science, Evan Parker can finally realize his improvising conception of real time electronic processing, improvisation, and extended technique. The sound is presented with no overdubs or edits, and the quartet falls into a comfortable, yet restless sound."

In a review for JazzTimes Bill Beuttler says "This music takes concentration, which might be easier to come by when experiencing it live. But there is beauty to be found in it, for those willing to make the effort."

== Track listing ==
All compositions by Rocket Science

1. "Fluid Dynamics" – 17:14
2. "Life Support Systems" – 16:26
3. "Flutter" – 12:54
4. "Noise Control" – 10:59

== Personnel ==
- Evan Parker – tenor sax, soprano sax
- Peter Evans – trumpet, piccolo trumpet
- Craig Taborn - piano
- Sam Pluta - laptop
