= Peter Evans (musician) =

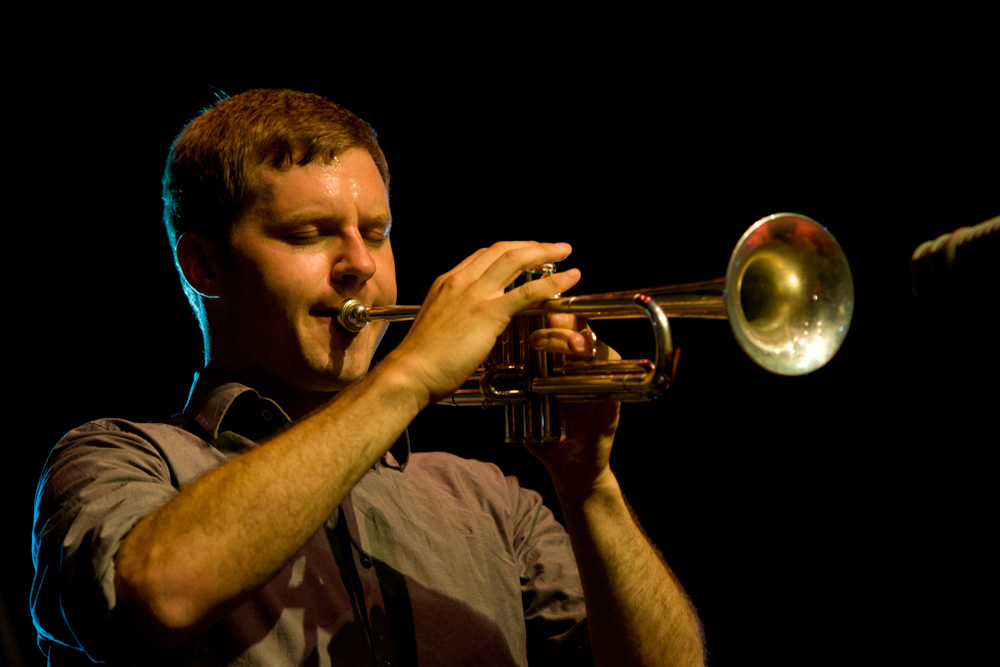
- Evans performing in 2012

Background information
- Born: October 2, 1981 (age 45)
- Genres: Free improvisation, avant-garde jazz, contemporary classical
- Occupation: Musician
- Instruments: Trumpet, piccolo trumpet
- Years active: 2002–present
- Labels: More Is More, Emanem, Firehouse 12, Thirsty Ear, ugEXPLODE, Carrier Records, psi, Dancing Wayang, Whirlwind, Dead CEO, Creative Sources
- Formerly of: Mostly Other People Do the Killing
- Website: peterevanstrumpet.com

Peter Evans is an American trumpeter who specializes in free improvisation and avant-garde music.

== Career ==
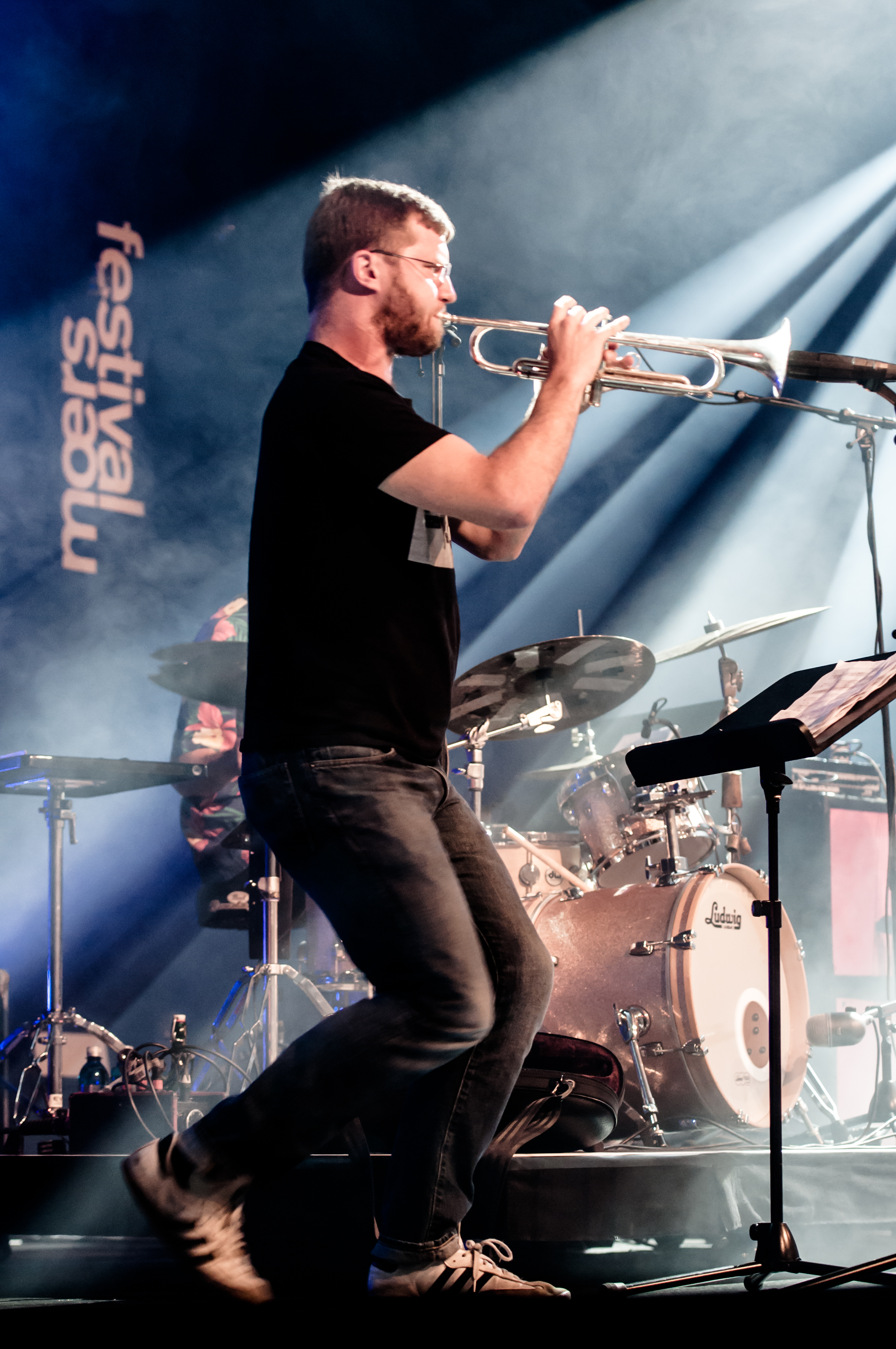
Peter Evans at the Moers Festival in 2015

Evans graduated from The Oberlin Conservatory of Music. He also studied at the New England Conservatory of Music's School of Preparatory Education. He has led the Peter Evans Quintet with Ron Stabinsky, Sam Pluta, Tom Blancarte, and Jim Black, the Zebulon trio with John Hebert and Kassa Overall, and was a member of the band Mostly Other People Do the Killing. He has worked with Peter Brötzmann, Mary Halvorson, Okkyung Lee, Evan Parker, Matana Roberts, Tyshawn Sorey, Dave Taylor, Weasel Walter, Dan Weiss, and John Zorn.

He is a member of the International Contemporary Ensemble and Wet by the ICE, Yarn/Wire, the Donaueschingen Musiktage Festival, the Jerome Foundation's Emerging Artist Program, and was a 2014 Artist-in-Residence at Issue Project Room in Brooklyn, New York. Evans performed at the 2016 Kanye West x Adidas fashion show in New York City.

In 2011 Evans founded the label More is More Records.

== Discography ==
- More Is More (psi, 2006)
- The Peter Evans Quartet (Firehouse 12, 2007)
- Nature/Culture (psi 2010)
- Scenes in the House of Music – with Evan Parker, Barry Guy, Paul Lytton (Clean Feed, 2010)
- Peter Evans Quartet – Live in Lisbon (Clean Feed, 2010)
- Ghosts (More is More, 2011)
- Beyond Civilized and Primitive (Dancing Wayang, 2011)
- The Bleeding Edge – with Okkyung Lee and Evan Parker (Psi, 2011)
- Hasselt (Psi, 2012) - with the Evan Parker Electro-Acoustic Ensemble
- Mechanical Malfunction – with Weasel Walter and Mary Halvorson (Thirsty Ear, 2013)
- Zebulon - Trio (More is More, 2013)
- Rocket Science – with Craig Taborn, Evan Parker and Sam Pluta (More Is More, 2013)
- Destination: Void (More is More, 2014)
- Premature Burial – with Matt Nelson and Dan Peck (New Atlantis, 2015)
- Amok Amor – with Wanja Slavin, Petter Eldh, Christian Lillinger (Boomslang, 2015)
- Pulverize the Sound (Relative Pitch, 2015)
- Syllogistic Moments – with Barry Guy (Maya, 2018)
- Two Live Sets - with Sam Pluta (Sam Pluta, 2020)
- Being And Becoming - Quartet (More Is More, 2020)
- Horizons (More Is More, 2020)
