= The Redwood Session =

Studio album by Evan Parker
- Released: 1996
- Recorded: June 18, 1995 at The Spirit Room in Rossie, New York
- Genre: Jazz
- Length: 59:05
- Label: CIMP CIMP 101
- Producer: Robert D, Rusch

Evan Parker chronology
| Breaths and Heartbeats (1994) | The Redwood Session (1996) | Natives and Aliens (1996) |

The Redwood Session is an album by saxophonist Evan Parker with bassist Barry Guy and drummer Paul Lytton recorded in 1995 which was the first release on the CIMP label.

== Reception ==
Professional ratings
Review scores
| Source | Rating |
|---|---|
| AllMusic | 4/5 stars |
| The Penguin Guide to Jazz Recordings | 3/4 stars |

AllMusic reviewer Scott Yanow stated "Those listeners with very open ears should find this set of interest".

The authors of the Penguin Guide to Jazz Recordings called the performances "non-vintage Parker/Guy/Lytton, fine in their way but lacking the intellectual command of previous discs."

In JazzTimes, Bill Shoemaker called the album "a well-engineered case in point that Parker's trio with bassist Barry Guy and drummer Paul Lytton is the premier improvised music ensemble of the '90s," and wrote: "The resulting listening experience is analogous to watching time-elapsed photography, an exciting compression of physical reality".

== Track listing ==
All compositions by Evan Parker, Barry Guy and Paul Lytton

1. "Not Yet" - 12:47
2. "The Masks" - 10:47
3. "Craig's Story" - 14:10
4. "Pedal (For Warren)" - 9:22
5. "Then Paul Saw the Snake (For Susan)" - 11:59

== Personnel ==
- Evan Parker - tenor saxophone, soprano saxophone
- Barry Guy - bass
- Paul Lytton - drums
- Joe McPhee - trumpet (track 5)
