= Dortmund Variations =

Live album by Evan Parker and Georg Gräwe
- Released: 2012
- Recorded: October 29, 2010
- Venues: Domicill, Dortmund
- Genre: Jazz
- Length: 63:40
- Label: Nuscope
- Producer: Georg Gräwe

Evan Parker chronology
Hasselt (2012)	Dortmund Variations (2012)	Rex, Wrecks & XXX (2013)

Dortmund Variations is an album by British jazz saxophonist Evan Parker and German pianist Georg Gräwe, which was recorded live in 2010 and released on Nuscope. This is the second recording by the duo, their first was Unity Variations.

== Reception ==
Professional ratings
Review scores
Source	Rating
Down Beat	4.5/5 stars
The Free Jazz Collective	3.5/5 stars

The Down Beat review by Bill Meyer states "It never feels like one is hanging back and supporting the other; their playing is nimble and unhesitant, advancing in quick flurries and elaborately articulated phrases that fit together marvelously even though the music is entirely improvised."

In a review for The New York City Jazz Record, Andrey Henkin commented: "Graewe skitters around the keyboard and Parker is downright sprightly in his attack, short blasts and trills aplenty. Despite the density of the playing, the tonality is airy and spacious - balladic in spots, in others the musical equivalent of an argument between Oberon and Titania."

The Free Jazz Collective's Martin Schray wrote: "Gräwe... is playing counter-rotating lines of incredible velocity especially with his right hand and Parker is winding around these notes as if he and Gräwe were dolphins courting... Parker's deconstructions can be stressful over the length of an hour but listeners dedicated to listening carefully as he follows the improvisational process and those who are willing to delve into Gräwe's fresh complexities will definitely enjoy this album."

Ken Waxman, writing for Jazz Word, called the album "an exploration of adversarial keyboard and reed techniques," and commented: "the pleasure derived from this duo is in chronicling the parries and thrusts of each participant as Graewe and Parker come to musical understandings."

== Track listing ==
All compositions by Parker/Gräwe

1. "Dortmund Variations I" – 37:03
2. "Dortmund Variations II" – 15:37
3. "Dortmund Variations III" – 11:00

== Personnel ==
- Evan Parker – tenor sax
- Georg Gräwe – piano
