= Music for David Mossman =

Music for David Mossman: Live at Vortex London

Live album by Evan Parker, Barry Guy, and Paul Lytton
- Released: 16 February 2018
- Recorded: 14 July 2016
- Venue: Vortex Jazz Club, London
- Genre: Free improvisation
- Label: Intakt; CD296
- Producer: Evan Parker, Intakt Records, Patrik Landolt

Evan Parker chronology
Duets 71977 (2017)	Music for David Mossman: Live at Vortex London (2018)	Linger Like Joy in Memory (2018)

Music for David Mossman: Live at Vortex London is a live album by saxophonist Evan Parker, double bassist Barry Guy, and drummer Paul Lytton. It was recorded on 14 July 2016, at the Vortex Jazz Club in London, and was released on 16 February 2018 through Intakt Records. The album is dedicated to the founder of the Vortex, who died in December 2018.

== Reception ==
Professional ratings
Review scores
Source	Rating
DownBeat	4/5 stars
All About Jazz	4.5/5 stars
The Free Jazz Collective	4/5 stars
Jazzwise	3/5 stars

In a review for DownBeat, Martin Longley wrote: "Even though these players all are hovering around age 70, they each play with the tempestuousness of younger men, adding expansive layers, resulting from years of experience."

John Sharpe of All About Jazz called the album "a dazzling account from a superlative threesome revealing a hitherto underappreciated emotional dimension to the richly-detailed tapestry they weave."

The Free Jazz Collective's Martin Schray described the recording as "music of an incredible density, music that varies harmonies and tempos constantly, music that changes its shape," and noted: "Hardly ever have these excellent musicians shown such a disposition to integrate their individual sounds and typical patterns to an all-encompassing unity."

Writing for Jazzwise, Daniel Spicer stated: "the three of them trade in a dense, information-rich music through which they seem to achieve the holy grail of free-improvisation: the group mind."

In an article for JazzTimes, Thomas Conrad commented: "The excitement comes from the spikes and crescendos, but even more from the overwhelming extravagance of detail. You can drown in the seas of this trio... Parker, Guy and Lytton celebrate the act of making music itself. They celebrate sound itself. Noise and melody are not as different as we thought."

Point of Departure's Jason Bivins stated that the album "is as powerful as anything the trio have done in recent years," and remarked: "the trio never lingers overlong in any particular place, nor do they change arbitrarily or too rapidly. It's as exploratory and organic as ever... There remains nothing like this group. Truly glorious."

Derek Taylor of Dusted Magazine wrote that the album is "affirmation that free isn't just a face value signifier, but something deeper and more elemental. With maestros such as Parker, Guy and Lytton it's a mantra that means every encounter will contain the means for finding something worthwhile and apart regardless of what's arisen before from their enduring associations."

In a review for The Whole Note, Stuart Broomer noted that the album's "dominant texture is that of philosophical dialogue, a rapid conversation in which participants discourse while responding to the simultaneous intrusions of partners in the fray, who may quibble or launch counter-offensives, sending the first speaker to submit background material or new support for his previous theses."

== Track listing ==
1. "Music for David Mossman I" – 12:50
2. "Music for David Mossman II" – 11:58
3. "Music for David Mossman III" – 24:15
4. "Music for David Mossman IV" – 12:29

== Personnel ==
- Evan Parker – saxophone
- Barry Guy – double bass
- Paul Lytton – drums
