= Sunny Melody =

Nigerian indigenous juju musician

Sunny Melody (born Sunday Adeola Ogunyemi) is a UK-based, Nigerian indigenous jùjú musician. While attending Ogun State University (renamed Olabisi Onabanjo University) in 1994–1998, he was a member of the school's music band (OSU MELODY) and studied Business Administration. Sunny formed his band after his National Youth Service in 1999 and eventually traveled to the UK in 2000.

He has recorded four albums, including Oyato (2003/2004), On the Dance Floor (2005/2006), Pasunnyfication (2008/2009), and Greater Heights (2013/2014). He recently released another single, "Evermore", in 2015. His music is used by KLM inflight entertainment. He made his debut concert at Vortex Jazz Club. He is working on his new album.

Sunny Melody won the City People Award in Nigeria and the Yoruba Heritage Award in UK for his musical contributions. He released a new single in 2017 titled "Fewa" produced by award winning producer "fliptyce". He released another single titled "Baba" in 2021, The song is dedicated to all "Fathers". In 2023, he released a one-minute chant on social media platforms titled "To ba ranju, ma ranju mo e" which has since gone viral in Nigeria.

Sunny Melody is one of the most travelled musicians. He travels more than 20 times yearly. He celebrated his 50th birthday in June 2025 in 3 major cities in the Uk. He released the singles “Asa”, “ki ninkan ko nise “, “ki ni mo se fun e”, and “Iru Eshin”.
