= America 2003 =

Live album by Evan Parker, Alexander von Schlippenbach, and Paul Lytton
- Released: 2004
- Recorded: May 1, 2003; May 14, 2003
- Venues: New Orleans Contemporary Arts Center; Seattle Asian Art Museum
- Genre: Free improvisation
- Labels: Psi; 04.06/7

Evan Parker chronology
The Bishop's Move (2004)	America 2003 (2004)	Evan Parker With Birds (2004)

America 2003 is a two-disc live album by saxophonist Evan Parker, pianist Alexander von Schlippenbach, and drummer Paul Lytton. It documents two concerts presented during a month-long tour of the United States, with disc one recorded on May 1, 2003, at the New Orleans Contemporary Arts Center, and disc two recorded on May 14, 2003, at the Seattle Asian Art Museum. The album was released on CD in 2004 by Psi Records.

On the tour, Schlippenbach was a replacement for bassist Barry Guy, who found himself unable to participate at the last minute. As a result, the group is a blend of Parker's usual trio (Parker, Guy, Lytton), and Schlippenbach's trio (Schlippenbach, Parker, Paul Lovens). All track titles were taken from "The Nature Theatre of Oklahoma," the unfinished final chapter of Franz Kafka's novel America.

== Reception ==
Professional ratings
Review scores
Source	Rating
AllMusic	3/5 stars
The Encyclopedia of Popular Music	3/5 stars
The Penguin Guide to Jazz	4/4 stars

In a review for AllMusic, François Couture wrote: "The pianist tends to bring out the softer, jazzier side of Parker, but this time the sax player is downright melodious at times... Parker's music often stretches out across the dynamic spectrum, but this album goes further, stretching through a wider range of expression... [the album] makes a very fine document of that particular tour."

The authors of The Penguin Guide to Jazz Recordings awarded the album a full four stars, calling it "one of Parker's most accessible and straightforwardly enjoyable" sets, as well as "an excellent place to start with his recent work."

Andrey Henkin of All About Jazz commented: "The music has a marvelous urgency to it that paradoxically takes its sweet time to develop... Unlike many other players of their generation who wallow in improvisation due to a dearth of creativity or have spurned it entirely, Parker, Schlippenbach and Lytton take it seriously and listeners will be struck with wonder at the results."

JazzWord's Ken Waxman remarked: "within the parameters of individual expression that the three have developed over the years, you can hear echoes of honking R&B saxmen from Parker and boogie-woogie bluescians from Schlippenbach... Jazz, boogie woogie, atonality, free music, whatever... In this configuration Parker, Schlippenbach and Lytton build an unanticipated novel sound from the sum of their techniques, backgrounds and future ideas."

Writing for One Final Note, Russell Summers praised Lytton's contribution, noting that the album "shows Lytton's inventiveness within a fresh setting." He wrote: "Lytton propels the music with an almost swing feel, which complements Schlippenbach's Monk influence throughout... Lytton underpins Parker's formidable tenor with flurries of skins, wood, and cymbals. The live recordings... show the strength of this great trio."

In an article for Paris Transatlantic, Nate Dorward wrote: "Both performances start calmly enough, but within minutes they've reached whirlwind speed... what gives the music its excitement is the sense that it's always a step away from another insanely accelerated spin-cycle. It's scary enough how fast and dense it gets; even scarier, it's delivered so lucidly you can actually follow it even at warp speed."

Bill Meyer of the Chicago Reader stated that each member of the trio has "attained singular mastery of his instrument, and between them they've stripped the jazz vernacular out of their musical language." He commented: "America 2003... "flows inexorably from one possibility to the next, including jagged juxtapositions of density and space and a bit of serialist boogie-woogie."

== Track listing ==
Disc 1

1. "Rejoicing in Their Hearts Over the Journey" – 21:48
2. "Ask to be Taken On as a Trumpeter" – 5:43
3. "This Blowing of Trumpets Confused Them" – 9:48
4. "What Memories of the Past Were Recalled!" – 8:19
5. "Perhaps This Was His Chance" – 8:25
6. "To Avoid Monotony" – 6:07

Disc 2

1. "No One Wanted to be an Artist but Every Man Wanted to be Paid for His Labours" – 15:00
2. "The Breath of Coldness" – 10:19
3. "Are You Strong Enough for Heavy Work?" – 10:07
4. "I Had a Friend Among the Angels" – 12:52
5. "Down With All Those Who Do Not Believe In Us" – 11:32

== Personnel ==
- Evan Parker – saxophone
- Alexander von Schlippenbach – piano
- Paul Lytton – percussion
