= Rex, Wrecks & XXX =

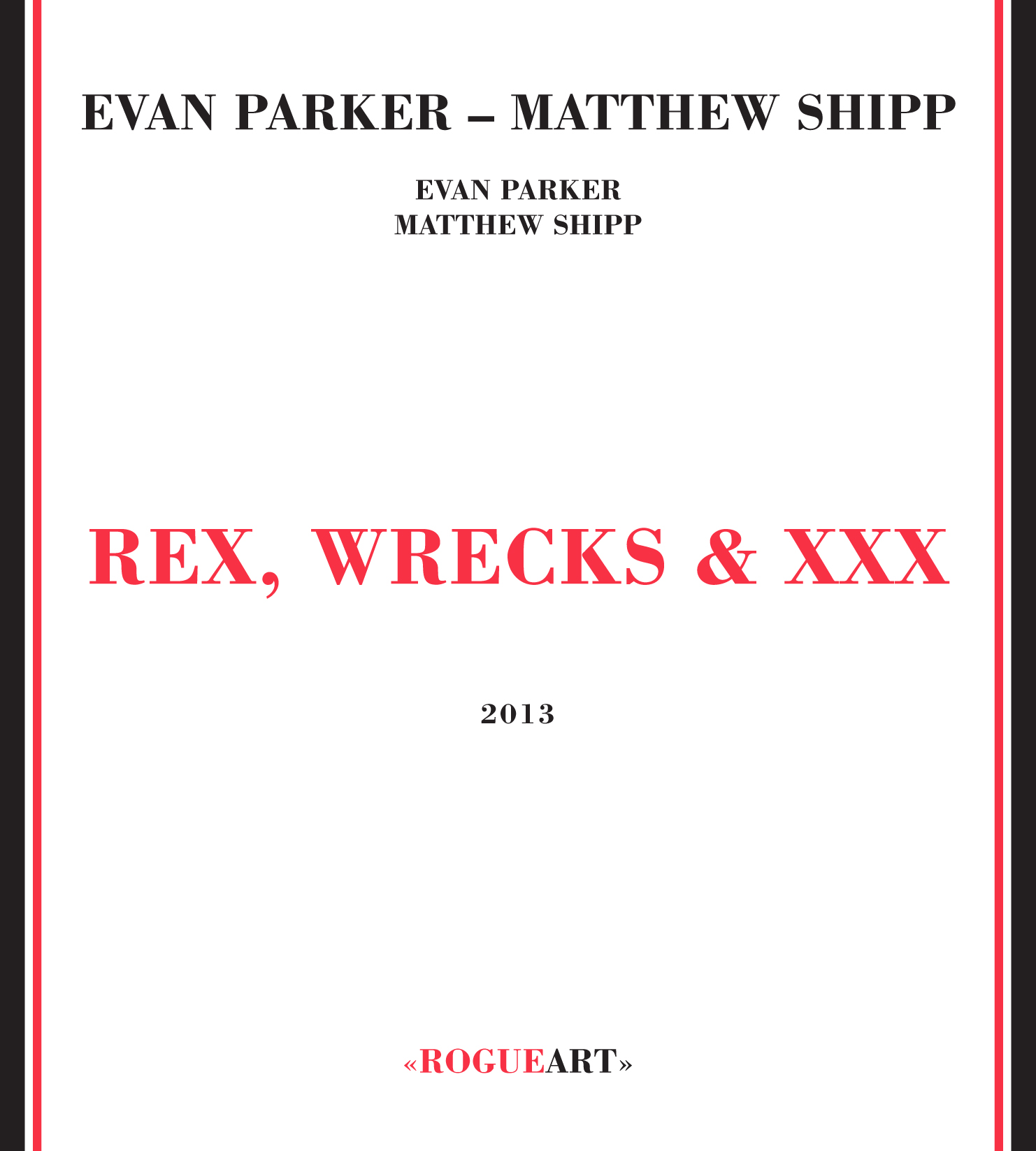

Studio album / Live album by Evan Parker and Matthew Shipp
- Released: 2013
- Recorded: September 6 & 7, 2011
- Venue: Vortex, London
- Genre: Jazz
- Length: 90:01
- Label: RogueArt
- Producer: Michel Dorbon

Evan Parker chronology
Dortmund Variations (2012)	Rex, Wrecks & XXX (2013)	Live at Maya Recordings Festival (2013)

Matthew Shipp chronology
Floating Ice (2013)	Rex, Wrecks & XXX (2013)	Piano Sutras (2013)

Rex, Wrecks & XXX is a double CD by British jazz saxophonist Evan Parker and American pianist Matthew Shipp released on the French RogueArt label. The disc one was recorded in studio and the disc two live at the Vortex in London the following day. The two “Wrecks” pieces are solo improvisations by Shipp and Parker. Previously, they collaborated on 2007's Abbey Road Duos.

== Reception ==
Professional ratings
Review scores
Source	Rating
Down Beat	5/5 stars

The Down Beat review by Daniel A. Brown states "Each player, armed with an arsenal of concepts, experience and technique, aims for a shared target, an alien melodicism centered on emotional expression, pulled form the unknown."

The Point of Departure review by Jason Bivins says "As is the case with all the music on this release, it’s extremely focused stuff that, while never for a moment sacrificing the utter distinctiveness of the musicians, is unpredictable and organic. Many of the pieces develop, at least for a brief interval, into a fragmentary, angular space that seems a common language for these two superb listeners."

== Track listing ==
All compositions by Parker/Shipp except as indicated

Disc One

1. "Rex 1" – 9:55
2. "Rex 2" – 6:46
3. "Wrecks 1" (Matthew Shipp) – 5:25
4. "Rex 3" – 1:34
5. "Wrecks 2" (Evan Parker) – 2:45
6. "Rex 4" – 6:11
7. "Rex 5" – 11:00
8. "Rex 6" – 4:33

Disc Two

1. "XXX" – 41:47

== Personnel ==
- Evan Parker – tenor sax
- Matthew Shipp – piano
