= Presto chango =

Presto chango may refer to:

- "Presto chango", magic words
- Prest-O Change-O, a 1939 Merrie Melodies cartoon
- Presto Change-O, a master impersonator hired by Dr. Claw and the antagonist of "The Infiltration", season 1, episode 17 of Inspector Gadget (1983)
- "Presto Change-O", Big Bag season 2, episode 8 (1998)
- "Presto Change-O", Power Rangers Ninja Steel episode 4 (2017)
- "Presto Change-O", The Fairly OddParents season 5, episode 15b (2005)
- "Presto Change-O", a song by Quasi from the 2006 album When the Going Gets Dark
- Presto Chango, a musical theater/performance group by Jeffrey Morgan
