= Time Will Tell (Paul Bley album) =

Studio album by Paul Bley / Evan Parker / Barre Phillips
- Released: January 1995
- Recorded: January 1994
- Studio: Rainbow Studio; Oslo, Norway
- Genre: Avant-garde jazz, free jazz, free improvisation
- Length: 67:15
- Label: ECM; ECM 1537
- Producer: Manfred Eicher

Paul Bley chronology
Synth Thesis (1993)	Time Will Tell (1995)	Chaos (1998)

Time Will Tell is an album by American jazz pianist Paul Bley recorded in January 1994 and released on ECM a year later. The trio features saxophonist Evan Parker and bassist Barre Phillips.

== Reception ==
Professional ratings
Review scores
Source	Rating
Penguin Guide to Jazz	4/4 stars
AllMusic	2.5/5 stars

The Penguin Guide to Jazz selected this album as part of its suggested Core Collection.

The AllMusic review by Scott Yanow awarded the album 2½ stars stating "This CD contains a series of mostly thoughtful free improvisations featuring three of the giants of the idiom... Although the results overall are not classic, the music never fails to hold on to one's interest as the three musicians continually think and evolve together".

== Track listing ==
All compositions by Paul Bley, Evan Parker & Barre Phillips except as indicated

1. "Poetic Justice" - 17:22
2. "Time Will Tell" - 4:25
3. "Above the Tree Line" - 4:49
4. "You Will, Oscar, You Will" (Bley, Phillips) - 4:57
5. "Sprung" - 5:22
6. "No Questions" - 5:30
7. "Vine Laces" (Parker, Phillips) - 4:04
8. "Clawback" (Bley, Parker) - 3:15
9. "Marsh Tides" - 5:43
10. "Instance" (Parker, Phillips) - 4:26
11. "Burlesque" - 7:15

== Personnel ==
- Paul Bley – piano
- Evan Parker – tenor saxophone, soprano saxophone
- Barre Phillips – bass
