= After Appleby =

Live album by Evan Parker, Barry Guy, Paul Lytton, and Marilyn Crispell
- Released: 2000
- Recorded: June 28 and 29, 1999
- Venue: Vortex Jazz Club, London
- Studio: Gateway Studio, London
- Genre: Free jazz
- Label: Leo Records; CD LR 283/284
- Producer: Evan Parker, Leo Feigin

After Appleby is a double-CD album by the members of the Evan Parker Trio (saxophonist Evan Parker, bassist Barry Guy, and drummer Paul Lytton), with guest pianist Marilyn Crispell. One CD was recorded on June 28, 1999, at Gateway Studio in London, while the other was recorded live the following day at the Vortex Jazz Club in London. The recordings took place immediately after the Appleby Jazz Festival, where the musicians performed in a variety of combinations. The album was released in 2000 by Leo Records.

== Reception ==
Professional ratings
Review scores
Source	Rating
AllMusic	4.5/5 stars
The Penguin Guide to Jazz	4/4 stars
All About Jazz	5/5 stars

In a review for AllMusic, Steve Loewy wrote: "Lytton and Guy... are longtime collaborators with Parker, but the addition of the pianist is a welcome addition to the mix, giving the proceedings an extra depth. Crispell can spurt fleetingly across the keyboard with clusters of notes, but she also shows a lyrical side that displays considerable depth. The longer tracks feature the quartet, while the others alternate between different combinations of the musicians. All are in perfect form, and the clear recording quality and lengthy recording time... commend this double-disc set to admirers of Evan Parker and freely improvised music."

The authors of the Penguin Guide to Jazz Recordings awarded the album 4 stars, calling the band "a free-music supergroup," and stating: "Crispell has been quieter recently... and it's tempting to suggest that this is really her album. Her duets with Guy and particularly with Lytton are masterpieces of delicate concentration. But it's Evan who dominates the long pieces, locked in dialogue with the sounds around him, constantly listening and responding and wasting nothing on empty gesture."

Writing for All About Jazz, Glenn Astarita described the album as "a festive union of bleeding edge improvisational spirits," and commented: "these esteemed musicians perform a series of works that pretty much skirt the fringes of every conceivable tract of intuitive expressionism imaginable along with hearty injections of antagonistic interplay and understated themes... the overall synergy and balance amongst the musicians provides the listener with a thoroughly cohesive and somewhat awe-inspiring portraiture of top-flight workmanship... After Appleby should meet or perhaps exceed most of our expectations in a grand sort of way! Highly recommended."

== Track listing ==
=== Disc one: studio recording ===
At Gateway Studio, London - 28 June 1999

1. "Warp" (Guy/Crispell) – 3:38
2. "Blue Star Kachina" (Guy/Parker/Crispell/Lytton) – 20:05
3. "Wax" (Crispell/Lytton) – 2:57
4. "Falcon's Wing" (Guy/Parker) – 2:54
5. "Wane" (Crispell/Lytton) – 3:10
6. "Weft" (Guy/Crispell) – 2:32
7. "Where Heart Revive" (Guy/Parker/Crispell/Lytton) – 25:14
8. "Tchefit" (Guy/Parker) – 3:05

=== Disc two: live recording ===
In concert at the Vortex Jazz Club, London - 29 June 1999

1. "Capnomantic Vortex (For David Mossman)" (Guy/Parker/Crispell/Lytton) – 51:36
2. "Fond Farewell" (Guy/Parker/Crispell/Lytton) – 15:59
3. (applause) - 0:19

== Personnel ==
- Evan Parker – soprano saxophone, tenor saxophone
- Barry Guy – double bass
- Paul Lytton – percussion
- Marilyn Crispell – piano
