= Chicago Tenor Duets =

Studio album by Evan Parker and Joe McPhee
- Released: 2002
- Recorded: May 11, 1998
- Studio: Airwave Studio, Chicago
- Genre: Jazz
- Length: 68:06
- Label: Okka Disk
- Producer: Bruno Johnson

Evan Parker chronology
Unity Variations (1999)	Chicago Tenor Duets (2002)	Drawn Inward (1999)

Joe McPhee chronology
The Brass City (1999)	Chicago Tenor Duets (2002)	The Watermelon Suite (1999)

Chicago Tenor Duets is an album by British jazz saxophonist Evan Parker and American saxophonist Joe McPhee, which was recorded in 1998 and released on Okka Disk.

== Reception ==
Professional ratings
Review scores
Source	Rating
The Penguin Guide to Jazz Recordings	3/4 stars

In a review for All About Jazz, Derek Taylor states "Each man bends to the other’s vernacular with Parker doling out some of his most linear and lyrical jazz phrasings in years and McPhee mimicking the creased multiphonics and split tones that are his partner’s regular sonic nomenclature."

In a multiple review for JazzTimes John Litweller says "If the disc has meandering passages, there are also plenty of successes in which lyricism and complexity twine (and for all their stylistic extremes, there are lyrical strains in both players)."

== Track listing ==
All compositions by Parker/McPhee

1. "Duet 2" – 4:47
2. "Duet 3" – 4:44
3. "Duet 4" – 5:12
4. "Duet 5" – 10:51
5. "Duet 6" – 3:07
6. "Duet 7" – 2:33
7. "Duet 9" – 6:46
8. "Duet 8" – 10:52
9. "Duet 11" – 10:40
10. "Duet 12" – 5:24
11. "Duet 13" – 3:10

== Personnel ==
- Evan Parker – tenor sax
- Joe McPhee – tenor sax
