= The Bleeding Edge (album) =

Live album by Evan Parker, Okkyung Lee, and Peter Evans
- Released: 2011
- Recorded: May 4, 2010
- Venue: St. Peter's Church, Whitstable, England
- Genre: Free improvisation
- Label: Psi; 11.10
- Producer: Evan Parker, Martin Davidson

Evan Parker chronology
At Somewhere There (2011)	The Bleeding Edge (2011)	Round About One O'clock (2011)

The Bleeding Edge is a live album by saxophonist Evan Parker, cellist Okkyung Lee, and trumpeter Peter Evans, three musicians from different continents, playing instruments of different families (woodwind, string, brass). Featuring five improvised duos and six trios, it was recorded on May 4, 2010, at St. Peter's Church in Whitstable, England, and was released on CD in 2011 by Psi Records.

== Reception ==
Professional ratings
Review scores
Source	Rating
The Free Jazz Collective	5/5 stars

In a review for Musicworks, Stuart Broomer wrote: "these aren’t simply virtuosos improvising, they're virtuoso improvisers, their skills specifically focused on the mutual creation of spontaneous music. There is everywhere here an alertness to the instant, to the new inference, but what makes it special is the individual and collective ability to knit this music together in extended units, initiating content as a matter of form, part of a continuum that will still be working itself out a few minutes and a thousand notes later."

Regarding the opening trio, John Eyles of All About Jazz stated: "It goes without saying that each of the players is a first-rate improviser, very experienced and adept at playing in such circumstances. None of them is used to taking a back seat and, rather than them competing for the limelight, they are all the focus of attention constantly. Their experience shows in the ways in which they react to each other and subtly adapt their playing to accommodate the other two."

The editors of The New York City Jazz Record included the album in their "Best of 2012" feature, and reviewer Ken Waxman commented: "The Bleeding Edge confirms that there's no generation gap among creative stylists... With each sequence blended into a sound mosaic, the edges here may be bleeding, but with minimum bloodiness and maximum improvisational circulation."

The Free Jazz Collective's Daniel Sorrells called the album "a display of musical minds and talents stripped of contextual baggage... challenging, sophisticated music that will reward anyone who opens themselves to it." He remarked: "It's uncommon to find a recording in which the individual strengths of each player are so constantly apparent, yet also so difficult to unravel from one another... The Bleeding Edge is an album to sit with. It's in turns beautiful, confounding, intimidating, and awe-inspiring."

== Track listing ==
1. "Trio 1" – 7:17
2. "Trio 2" – 6:42
3. "Duo 1" – 4:49
4. "Trio 3" – 5:54
5. "Duo 2" – 5:28
6. "Trio 4" – 9:46
7. "Duo 3" – 4:38
8. "Duo 4" – 4:29
9. "Duo 5" – 4:19
10. "Trio 5" – 8:37
11. "Trio 6" – 6:20

== Personnel ==
- Evan Parker – soprano saxophone, tenor saxophone
- Okkyung Lee – cello
- Peter Evans – trumpet, piccolo trumpet
