= Hasselt (album) =

Live album by Evan Parker Electro-Acoustic Ensemble
- Released: 2012
- Recorded: May 21–22, 2010
- Venue: Kunstencentrum Belgie, Hasselt, Belgium
- Genre: Free improvisation
- Length: 1:12:45
- Label: Psi; 12.03
- Producer: Evan Parker, Martin Davidson

Evan Parker chronology
| Foxes Fox: Live at the Vortex (2012) | Hasselt (2012) | Dortmund Variations (2012) |

Evan Parker Electro-Acoustic Ensemble chronology
| The Moment's Energy (2009) | Hasselt (2012) | Warszawa 2019 (2021) |

Hasselt is a live album by the Evan Parker Electro-Acoustic Ensemble, recorded during the Open Circuit: iNTERACT 2010 festival, held at Kunstencentrum Belgie in Hasselt, Belgium. The first three tracks, recorded on May 21, 2010, feature sub-groups drawn from the Ensemble, while the final track, recorded on May 22, 2010, is an extended outing for the entire Ensemble. The album was released in 2012 by Psi Records.

== Reception ==
Professional ratings
Review scores
| Source | Rating |
|---|---|
| All About Jazz | 4.5/5 stars |
| The Free Jazz Collective | 5/5 stars |

In a review for All About Jazz, John Eyles called the album "a valuable addition to the discography" of the group, and wrote: "the small groups throw together combinations of instruments and sounds that are fresh and stimulating... in "Hasselt 4"... so much processing takes place that it becomes impossible to tell the original from its image from the image of its image and so on. But, that blurring is the joy of this ensemble... as it creates a shimmering kaleidoscopic effect that is as mesmerising here as ever."

The New York City Jazz Record's Andrey Henkin suggested that Parker's "lengthy, circular-breathing based excursions often took on an almost electronic quality," perhaps inspiring him to found the Electroacoustic Ensemble, and noted: "The music has a suite-like quality across the first three tracks, the acoustic instruments seizing greater control against the tasteful electronics. The fourth piece... is necessarily denser and episodic as musicians float or stab their way in or out, with the electronic and acoustic elements in more balance."

Ken Waxman of JazzWord described the album as "a gratifying listen," stating: "this disc is notable historically, showing how the philosophies of pure electronics and pure acoustics can intersect." He praised the final track, in which "the performance reaches a crescendo of continuous mercurial textures. Tremolo bellowing, reed yelps, percussive piano cascades and blunt ruffs plus stick clatters from the drummer intersect with oozing, processed flanges. Skyscraper-high grace notes from the piccolo trumpet surmount the siren-like contrapuntal electric modulations for an additional jolt, presaging the more moderated finale."

Writing for Signal to Noise Magazine, Jason Bivins also singled out the final track for praise, calling it "a chirpy, effusive piece which forces the ensemble to move away from laminal improvising and explore nearly percussive phraseology." He commented: "Fernandez's marvelous prepared piano lines wend their way deep into the electronic fabric, with brass and overtones creating some kind of wind-based forest for a spell."

The editors of The Free Jazz Collective awarded the album a full 5 stars, and reviewer Martin Schray remarked: "no matter what line-up we are listening to - the music is fascinating – it is diverse and the musicianship is simply great. The musicians are piling up layer after layer of sounds, and although the musical atmosphere created is hard and sometimes even grinding, you can feel a beauty underneath based on communication and imagination."

== Track listing ==
1. "Hasselt 1" (Agusti Fernandez, Ishikawa Ko, Walter Prati) – 10:12
2. "Hasselt 2" (Richard Barrett, Barry Guy, Paul Obermayer, Peter van Bergen) – 11:41
3. "Hasselt 3" (Peter Evans, Agusti Fernandez, Ishikawa Ko, Paul Lytton, Ned Rothenberg) – 15:54
4. "Hasselt 4" (Evan Parker) – 34:37

== Personnel ==
- Evan Parker – soprano saxophone (track 4)
- Richard Barrett – electronics (tracks 2, 4)
- Lawrence Casserley – signal processing, percussion, voice (track 4)
- Peter Evans – trumpet, piccolo trumpet (tracks 3, 4)
- Agusti Fernandez – piano, prepared piano (tracks 1, 3, 4)
- Barry Guy – double bass (tracks 2, 4)
- Ishikawa Ko – sho (tracks 1, 3, 4)
- Paul Lytton – percussion, live electronics (tracks 3, 4)
- Paul Obermayer – live electronics (tracks 2, 4)
- Walter Prati – live electronics, computer processing (tracks 1, 4)
- Ned Rothenberg – clarinet, bass clarinet (tracks 3, 4)
- Joel Ryan – sample and signal processing (track 4)
- Peter van Bergen – A♭ and contrabass clarinets (tracks 2, 4)
- Marco Vecchi – sound processing, sound projection (track 4)
