= Chaos (Paul Bley album) =

Studio album by Paul Bley Furio Di Castri and Tony Oxley
- Released: October 6, 1998
- Recorded: March 28–29, 1994
- Studio: Mu Rec Studios, Milan, Italy
- Genre: Jazz
- Length: 59:19
- Label: Soul Note SN 1285
- Producer: Giovanni Bonandrini

Paul Bley chronology
Time Will Tell (1994)	Chaos (1998)	Modern Chant (1994)

Chaos is an album by pianist Paul Bley, bassist Furio Di Castri and drummer Tony Oxley, recorded in Italy in 1994 and released on the Soul Note label in 1998.

== Reception ==
Professional ratings
Review scores
Source	Rating
AllMusic	4.5/5 stars
The Penguin Guide to Jazz Recordings	3/4 stars

AllMusic stated: "This set of concise free improvisations is highly recommended to open-minded listeners".

All About Jazz wrote: "There are plenty of interesting harmonies here, and a sense of rhythm which both includes and goes beyond the tyranny of the beat. Fans of Paul Bley or post-bop music in general will have a treat with this beautifully produced recording". Another review on the same site stated: "Bley and company have churned out a very interesting collection of tunes that stretch the imagination and boundaries of jazz".

== Track listing ==
All compositions by Paul Bley except as indicated

1. "Chaos" - 4:53
2. "Touching Bass" (Furio Di Castri) - 3:47
3. "Modulating" (Tony Oxley) - 4:37
4. " Soft Touch" (Bley, Oxley) - 5:58
5. "Poetic Justice" - 6:36
6. "Interpercussion 1" (Oxley) - 1:51
7. "Touch Control" - 3:22
8. "Turnham Bey" - 4:58
9. "Street Wise" - 6:07
10. "Bow Out" (Oxley) - 4:20
11. "Starting Over" - 5:16
12. "Interpercussion 2" (Oxley) - 3:34
13. "Template" - 4:00

== Personnel ==
- Paul Bley - piano
- Furio Di Castri - bass
- Tony Oxley - drums
