= Memory/Vision =

Live album by Evan Parker Electro-Acoustic Ensemble
- Released: 2003
- Recorded: October 2002
- Venue: Norges Musikkhøgskole; Oslo, Norway
- Genre: Jazz
- Length: 70:53
- Label: ECM; ECM 1852
- Producer: Steve Lake

Evan Parker chronology
Alder Brook (2003)	Memory/Vision (2003)	Set (2003)

Evan Parker Electro-Acoustic Ensemble chronology
Drawn Inward (1999)	Memory/Vision (2003)	The Eleventh Hour (2005)

Memory/Vision is a live album by the Evan Parker Electro-Acoustic Ensemble recorded at the Norwegian Academy of Music in Oslo in October 2002 and released on ECM the following year.

== Reception ==
Professional ratings
Review scores
Source	Rating
AllMusic	4/5 stars
The Penguin Guide to Jazz Recordings	4/4 stars
The Guardian	3/5 stars
All About Jazz	4/5 stars

The AllMusic review by Thom Jurek awarded the album 4 stars stating "this is one of the most emotionally resonant works Parker has given listeners. And one hopes that such a description will not insult his brilliant mind or his aesthetic sensibilities. Wonderful."

The authors of the Penguin Guide to Jazz Recordings awarded the album 4 stars, and wrote: "The single continuous performance has both a monumental quality and a strong sense of process and flux, like a sculpture made of plasma rather than stone or bronze."

In a review for The Guardian, John Fordham called the music "an extended piece of composition deploying some comparatively orthodox narrative notions about highs and lows, episodes of dramatic intensity and quiet reflection," and commented: "It's for a pretty specialised audience, but close followers and new converts to Parker's uncompromising creativity may well be intrigued."

Chris Kelsey, writing for Jazz Times, stated: "Textures ebb and flow; slow and sparse morphs into fast and dense. The musicians are all very sensitive and reactive free improvisers, as are the sound-processing guys, for the most part."

The BBC's Peter Marsh wrote: "This is music that hangs in the air, sometimes vaporous, sometimes almost sculptural in its weight. Parker's structures make this a rewarding (and repeatable) experience, and the spacious, pristine production gives each sound room to breathe. Luscious, alien stuff, and utterly beautiful."

In an article for All About Jazz, Jerry D'Souza remarked: "Time and structure go through various dimensions. Structure is broken, time fragmented, in a flow that ebbs and eddies. When the machines are the end voice, the ideas that leap out in jiggles and squeals and whirs are mesmerising. There is also the strength that derives from the playing."

Beppe Colli of Clocks and Clouds stated: "Evan Parker has succeeded in producing a work... which could not exist without modern technology but which is not slave to it in ways that today are all-too-common on a mass market—or à la mode. A work that is aesthetically accessible while being interesting at the same time. Which, given the present times, is definitely not to be underestimated."

== Track listing ==
All compositions by Evan Parker

1. "Part 1" - 10:22
2. "Part 2" - 11:18
3. "Part 3" - 5:09
4. "Part 4" - 13:21
5. "Part 5" - 12:43
6. "Part 6" - 9:10
7. "Part 7" - 8:31

== Personnel ==
- Evan Parker - soprano saxophone, tapes and samples
- Philipp Wachsmann - violin, electronics
- Agustí Fernandez - piano, prepared piano
- Barry Guy - double bass
- Paul Lytton - percussion, electronics
- Lawrence Casserley - signal processing instrument
- Joel Ryan - computer, sound-processing
- Walter Prati - electronics, sound processing
- Marco Vecchi - electronics, sound processing
