= Live at Maya Recordings Festival =

Live album by Evan Parker, Barry Guy, and Paul Lytton
- Released: September 1, 2013
- Recorded: September 23–25, 2011
- Venue: Theater am Gleis, Winterthur, Switzerland
- Genre: Free improvisation
- Length: 1:01:32
- Label: NoBusiness; NBCD55
- Producer: Danas Mikailionis, Valerij Anosov

Evan Parker chronology
Rex, Wrecks & XXX (2013)	Live at Maya Recordings Festival (2013)	Rocket Science (2013)

Live at Maya Recordings Festival is a live album by saxophonist Evan Parker, double bassist Barry Guy, and drummer Paul Lytton. It was recorded during September 23–25, 2011, at the Theater am Gleis in Winterthur, Switzerland, and was released on both vinyl and CD in 2013 by NoBusiness Records.

== Reception ==
Professional ratings
Review scores
Source	Rating
DownBeat	5/5 stars
All About Jazz	4.5/5 stars
The Free Jazz Collective	4.5/5 stars
Tom Hull – on the Web	A−

The editors of DownBeat awarded the album a full 5 stars, with reviewer Michael Jackson commenting: "if you know this trio you'll know what to expect." DownBeat's January 2014 "Best Album" feature included the album in the "Masterpiece" category, noting its "colossal displays of extended virtuosity."

John Sharpe of All About Jazz called the album "another top notch entry" in "an already distinguished discography," with the musicians "convers[ing] in a language entirely of their own making, which relies on a staggering density of ideas, chops to burn and a preternatural responsiveness."

The Free Jazz Collective's Martin Schray stated that the album "presents the trio at its best," and remarked: "they are a well-greased machine, an improvising entity, a true trio – with a drummer that stirs the shit, a bass that provides an irresistible pulse (plus some extra surprises) and a saxophonist who does not use this context for selfish solos but for tight and spontaneous interaction looking for new pastures."

Writing for Dusted Magazine, Derek Taylor commented: "Even when all three are racing at a collective sprint the music never fails to breathe or flow. It's in this particular facet where their shared experience shows most."

In an article for The New York City Jazz Record, Andrey Henkin noted that the "trio never loses a sense of dynamism... there are no dead spots, those dithering moments that infect low-grade improvisational music. The tropes that come up are not conciliatory but challenging and the audible comfort level between the musicians requires everyone to be fully participatory."

JazzWord's Ken Waxman stated that "anyone who claims that experimental music lacks emotion must hear" the album, and praised "the combination of precision and passion that also marks the most accomplished string quartet performance."

Writing for The Absolute Sound, Jeff Wilson described the album as "an all-out, no-holds barred performance that bristles with live energy," and commented: "The communication among the trio as well as their use of dynamics is exceptional... one gets the impression that this long-running trio gave it everything they had artistically and physically."

== Track listing ==
Music composed by Evan Parker, Barry Guy, and Paul Lytton.

1. "Obsidian" – 22:31
2. "Chert" – 13:11
3. "Gabbro" – 17:29
4. "Scoria" – 8:21

== Personnel ==
- Evan Parker – soprano saxophone, tenor saxophone
- Barry Guy – double bass
- Paul Lytton – drums
