= Paul Lytton =

British musician (born 1947)

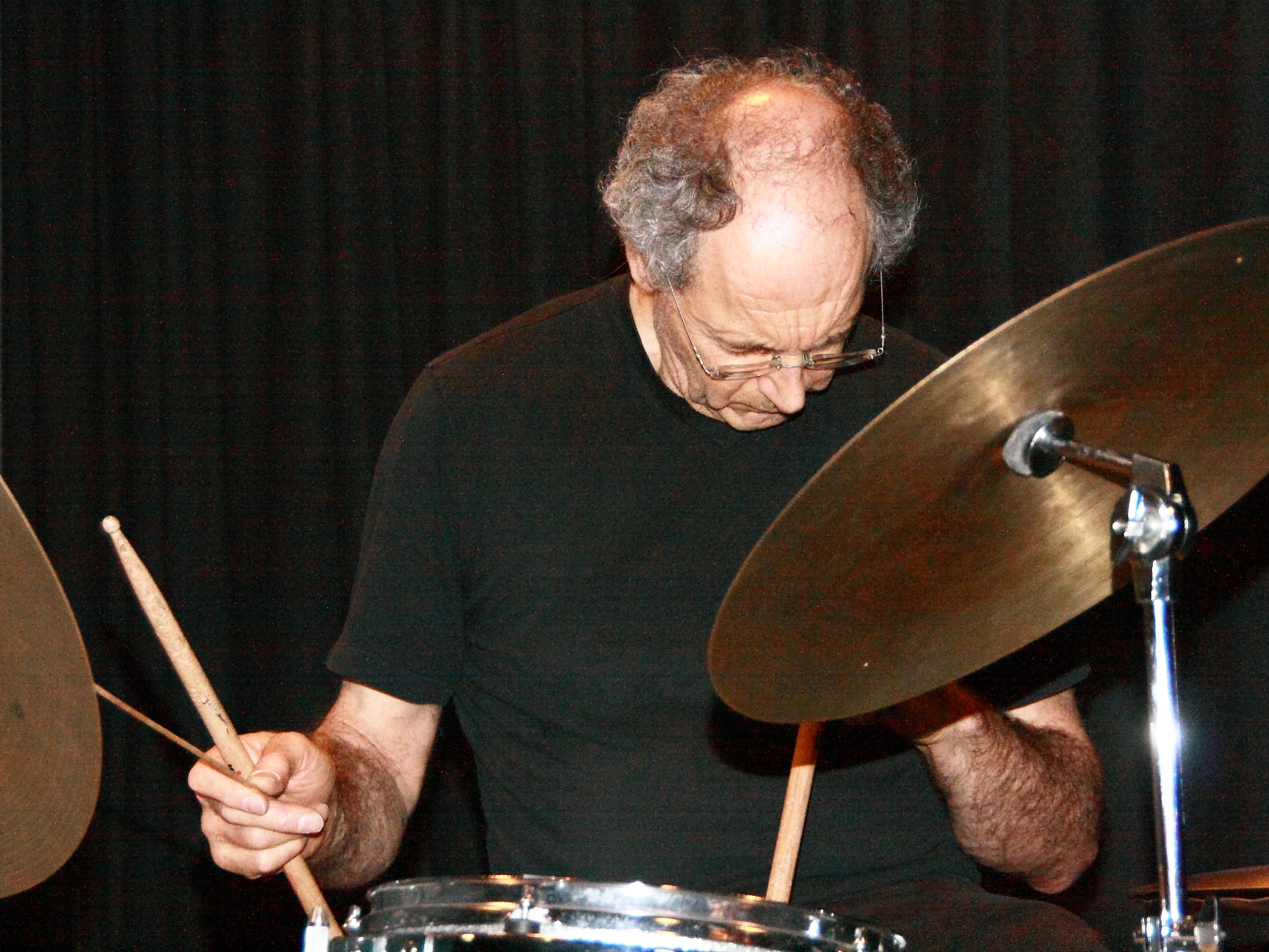
Paul Lytton at Club W71, Weikersheim, 2011

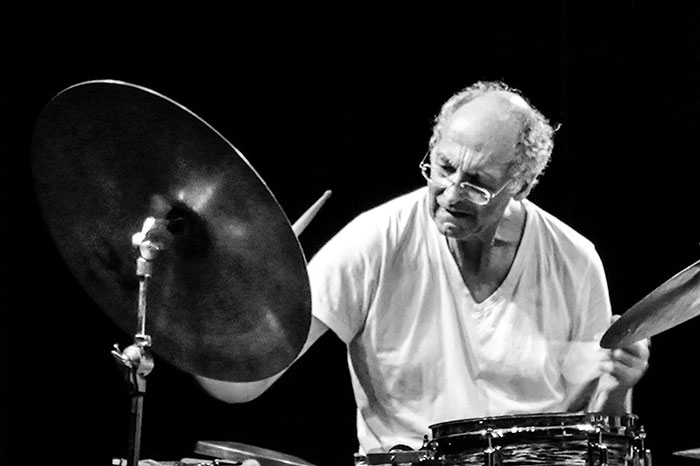
Paul Lytton (2016) in Aarhus, Denmark. Playing with Mette Rasmussens Quintet

Paul Lytton (born 8 March 1947, London) is an English free jazz and free improvising percussionist.

Lytton began on drums at age 16. He played jazz in London in the late 1960s while taking lessons on the tabla from P.R. Desai. In 1969 he began experimenting with free improvisational music, working in a duo with saxophonist Evan Parker. After adding bassist Barry Guy, the ensemble became the Evan Parker Trio. He and Parker continued to work together into the 2000s; more recent releases include trio releases with Marilyn Crispell in 1996 (Natives and Aliens) and 1999 (After Appleby).

A founding member of the London Musicians Collective, Lytton worked extensively on the London free improvisation scene in the 1970s, and aided Paul Lovens in the foundation of the Aachen Musicians' Cooperative in 1976.

Lytton has toured North America and Japan both solo and with improvisational ensembles. In 1999, he toured with Ken Vandermark and Kent Kessler, and recorded with Vandermark on English Suites. Lytton also collaborated with Jeffrey Morgan (alto & tenor saxophone), with whom he recorded the CD Terra Incognita Live in Cologne, Germany.

He played also on White Noise's pioneer electronic pop music album An Electric Storm in 1969.

== Discography (partial) ==
=== As leader ===
- The Inclined Stick (Po Torch, 1979)
- The Balance of Trade (CIMP, 1996)
- ?! (Pleasure of the Text, 2015)

=== As sideman or co-leader ===
With Barry Guy and Marilyn Crispell

- Odyssey (Intakt, 2001)
- Ithaca (Intakt, 2004)
- Phases of the Night (Intakt, 2008)
- Deep Memory (Intakt, 2016)

With Barry Guy/The London Jazz Composers' Orchestra

- Ode (Incus, 1972)
- Zurich Concerts (Intakt, 1988)
- Harmos (Intakt, 1989)
- Double Trouble (Intakt, 1990)
- Theoria (Intakt, 1992)
- Double Trouble Two (Intakt, 1998)
- Radio Rondo/Schaffhausen Concert (Intakt, 2009)

With the Barry Guy New Orchestra

- Inscape–Tableaux (Intakt, 2001)
- Oort–Entropy (Intakt, 2005)

With Roscoe Mitchell

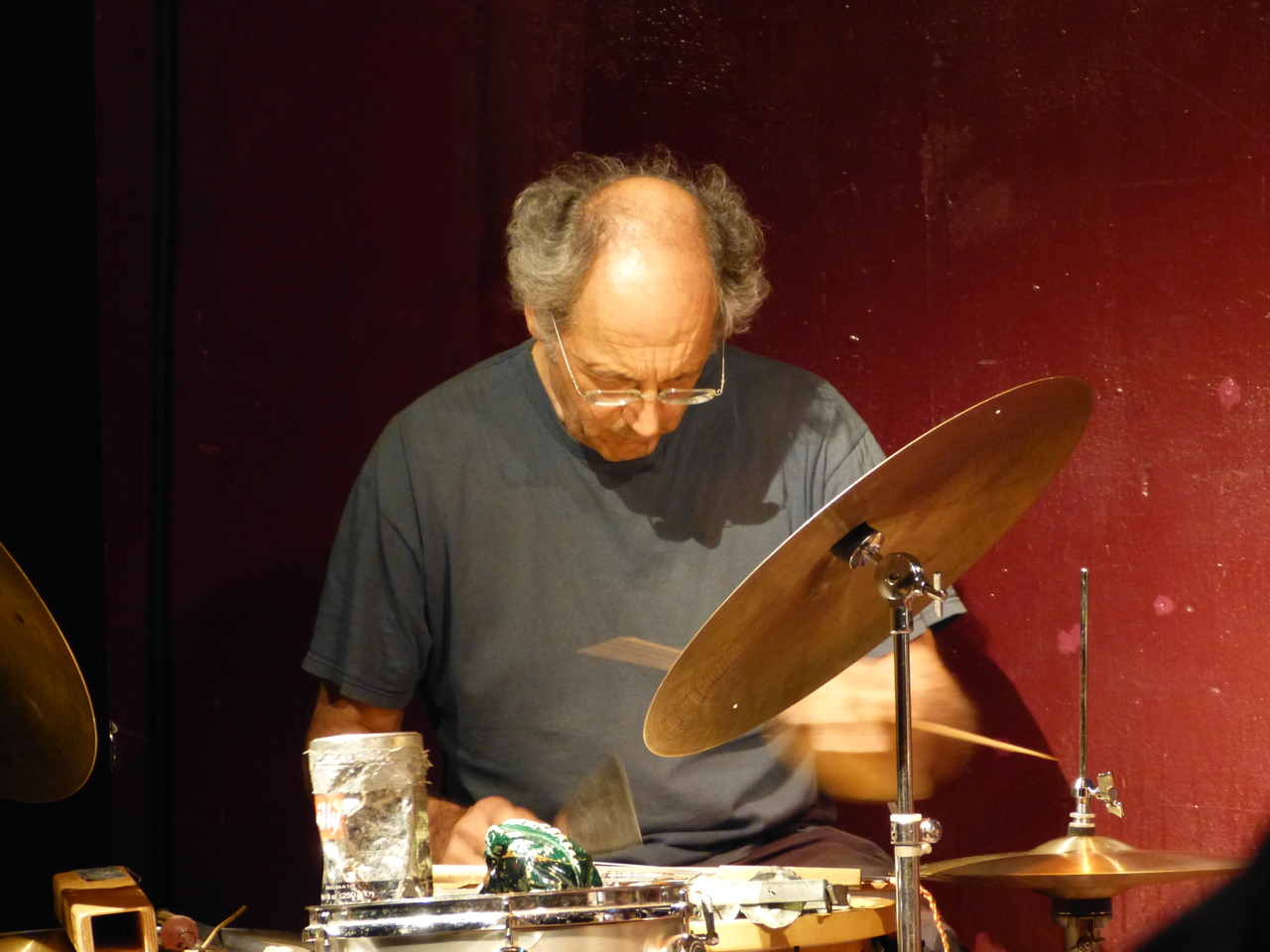
Paul Lytton, the sound tinkerer, at Stadtgarten Cologne 2012

- Composition/Improvisation Nos. 1, 2 & 3 (ECM, 2004)

With Evan Parker

- Collective Calls (Urban) (Two Microphones) (Incus, 1972)
- At the Unity Theatre (Incus, 1975)
- Atlanta (Impetus, 1990)
- 50th Birthday Concert (Leo, 1994)
- The Redwood Session (CIMP, 1995)
- Toward the Margins (ECM, 1996)
- Drawn Inward (ECM, 1998)
- At the Vortex (Emanem, 1998)
- Memory/Vision (ECM, 2002)
- America 2003 (Psi, 2004) with Alexander von Schlippenbach
- Boustrophedon (ECM, 2004)
- The Bishop's Move (Les Disques Victo, 2004)
- The Moment's Energy (ECM, 2007)
- Hasselt (Psi, 2012)
- Live at Maya Recordings Festival (NoBusiness, 2013)
- Music for David Mossman: Live at Vortex London (Intakt, 2018)

With Evan Parker, Barry Guy, and Marilyn Crispell

- Natives and Aliens (Leo, 1997)
- After Appleby (Leo, 2000)

With Ken Vandermark, et alia

- Paul Lytton/Ken Vandermark: English Suites (Wobbly Rail, 2000)
- Paul Lytton/Ken Vandermark/Philipp Wachsmann: CINC (Okka Disk, 2006)
- Paul Lytton/Nate Wooley + Ikue Mori/Ken Vandermark: The Nows (Clean Feed, 2012)
