= Lawrence Casserley =

English composer (born 1941)

Lawrence Casserley (born August 10, 1941 in Little Easton, Essex, England) is a composer, conductor and performer, to real time electro-acoustic music. Lawrence Casserley was professor of electro-acoustic music at the Royal College of Music in London

== Early life ==
Casserley graduated from Kent School in Kent, Connecticut in 1959.

== Discography ==
- Solar Wind with Evan Parker, 1997
- Work in Progress, 1997
- Live at Les Instants Chavires with Evan Parker, Noël Akchoté and Joel Ryan, 1997
- Dividuality with Evan Parker and Barry Guy, 1997
- Labyrinths, 1997—98
- The Evan Parker Electro-Acoustic Ensemble: Drawn Inward (ECM, 1998)
- The edge of chaos, 2001
- The Evan Parker Electro-Acoustic Ensemble: Memory/Vision (ECM, 2002)
- Angelic weaponry, 2003
- Iskra³ with Paul Rutherford, 2004
- The Evan Parker Electro-Acoustic Ensemble: The Eleventh Hour (ECM, 2004)
- Music from Colourdome, 2006
- The Evan Parker Electro-Acoustic Ensemble: The Moment's Energy (ECM, 2007)
- The Evan Parker Electro-Acoustic Ensemble: Hasselt (Psi, 2012)

== Compositions ==
Orchestral Studies, 1964—67; 7 Pieces for 14 Players, 1965; 12 Pieces for Piano, 1965; Mixtures and Interludes für kleines Ensemble, 1967; Fanfares for the Manifestation to the Gentiles for Organ and three trumpets, 1968; Exultation for the Expulsion from Eden for Organ, 1968; The Final Desolation of Solitude for Tonband, 1969; Transformations I für Tonband, 1970; Transformations II for Piano and Liveelektronik, 1970; Kyries and Alleluias I for Orgel, Cembalo and Tonband, 1972; Dodman Point for Liveelektronik and Licht, 1972; Kyries and Alleluias II for Flute, Violin, Piano und Tonband, 1972	Duolith for Tonband, 1972; 15 Shakespeare Kaku for Tonband, 1973; Eclipse, 1975; Kyries and Alleluias IV for 16 Instrumente and Liveelektronik, 1976; Transformations IV for Tonband, 1977; Aura for Computer and Licht, 1977; Hydraphone, 1978; Transformations III for Flute and Liveelektronik, 1982; Vista Clara for Klavier and Liveelektronik, 1982; PanDemonic, 1984	PanHarmonic Live-Computer music, 1985; The Unending Rose, Music theater for Flute, Posaune, Schlagzeug, Schauspieler and Liveelektronik, 1987; Labyrinth Music theatre for Flute, Stimme, Schauspieler, Tänzer and LIveelektronik, 1989; The Monk’s Prayer for Bassflöte and Liveelektronik, 1989; Los Hijos del Sol for Stimme, PanDrums and Liveelektronik, 1990; Ritual Dances for three Schlagzeuger, Oboe, Klarinette, Trompete, Viola, Klavier, Tonband and Liveelektronik, 1991; Siwrnai, Odyssey of Light for Instrumente, Stimmen, Schauspieler und Signalprozessor, 1992; UbAtAbU for Tuba and Signalprozessor, 1993; The Garden of Forking Paths for Guitar and Signal processor, 1996
