= 50th Birthday Concert =

Live album by Evan Parker
- Released: 1994
- Recorded: April 10, 1994
- Venue: Dingwalls, Camden, England
- Genre: Free Jazz
- Length: 83:20
- Label: Leo; CD LR 212/213
- Producer: Evan Parker and Leo Feigin

Evan Parker chronology
Imaginary Values (1994)	50th Birthday Concert (1994)	Obliquities (1995)

50th Birthday Concert is a double CD live album by British saxophonist and improviser Evan Parker recorded at Dingwalls in 1993 and released on the English Leo label.

== Reception ==
Professional ratings
Review scores
Source	Rating
AllMusic	4.5/5 stars
Penguin Guide to Jazz	👑

AllMusic awarded the album 4½ stars with reviewer Steve Loewy stating:

What a splendid birthday celebration this was! Parker is clearly at the peak of his form, and he is enjoying the interaction with these two splendid groups ... Not to be missed, this is great Evan Parker all the way.

— Loewy, Steve. 50th Birthday Concert – Review at AllMusic. Retrieved January 4, 2017.

The Penguin Guide to Jazz awarded the album a "Crown" signifying a recording that the authors "feel a special admiration or affection for".

== Track listing ==
Disc One
No.	Title	Writer(s)	Length
1.	"Hero of Nine Fingers"	Evan Parker, Alexander von Schlippenbach, Paul Lovens	24:31
2.	"Bowed Stiffly and Went Free"	Evan Parker, Alexander von Schlippenbach, Paul Lovens	19:22

Disc Two
No.	Title	Writer(s)	Length
1.	"In Exultation"	Evan Parker, Barry Guy, Paul Lytton	20:38
2.	"Not Backwards, as in Doubt"	Evan Parker, Barry Guy, Paul Lytton	9:25
3.	"The Echoing Border Zones"	Evan Parker, Barry Guy, Paul Lytton	9:24

== Personnel ==
- Evan Parker – soprano saxophone, tenor saxophone
- Alexander von Schlippenbach - piano (Disc One)
- Barry Guy - bass (Disc Two)
- Paul Lovens (Disc One), Paul Lytton (Disc Two) - percussion
