= Pakistani Pomade =

Studio album by Alexander von Schlippenbach Trio
- Released: 1973
- Recorded: November 1972 in Bremen
- Genre: Free jazz
- Length: 42:45; 66:16 (CD reissue)
- Label: FMP 0110
- Producer: Jost Gebers

Alexander von Schlippenbach chronology
Payan (1972)	Pakistani Pomade (1973)	For Example (1973)

Pakistani Pomade is an album by German free jazz pianist Alexander von Schlippenbach's Trio, featuring saxophonist Evan Parker and percussionist Paul Lovens, recorded in Germany in 1972 for the FMP label.

== Reception ==
Professional ratings
Review scores
Source	Rating
Allmusic	4.5/5 stars
Penguin Guide to Jazz	👑

The Allmusic review by Thom Jurek awarded the album 4½ stars stating "This truly inspiring music was made by a band who had yet to see how much taste, grace, and elegance they possessed. Pakistani is essential listening for vanguard jazz fans".

The Penguin Guide to Jazz awarded the album a "Crown" signifying a recording that the authors "feel a special admiration or affection for".

All About Jazz stated "The group carries a stalwart emphasis on color, texture, and density—of both the timbral and harmonic kind... European improv never sounded better"

== Track listing ==
All compositions by Alexander von Schlippenbach, Evan Parker & Paul Lovens

1. "Sun-Luck Night-Rain" - 5:22
2. "Butaki Sisters" - 9:07
3. "A Little Yellow (Including Two Seconds Monk)" - 7:09
4. "Ein Husten für Karl Valentin" - 3:22
5. "Pakistani Pomade" - 6:02
6. "Von "G" AB 403-418" - 0:52
7. "Moonbeef" - 10:05
8. "Kleine Nülle, Evergreen" - 0:49
9. "Pakistani Alternate #1" - 11:35 Bonus track on CD reissue
10. "Pakistani Alternate #2" - 0:52 Bonus track on CD reissue
11. "Pakistani Alternate #3" - 7:00 Bonus track on CD reissue
12. "Pakistani Alternate #4" - 4:01 Bonus track on CD reissue

== Personnel ==
- Alexander von Schlippenbach - piano
- Evan Parker - soprano saxophone, tenor saxophone
- Paul Lovens - drums
