= Ithaca (Barry Guy, Marilyn Crispell, and Paul Lytton album) =

Studio album by Barry Guy, Marilyn Crispell, and Paul Lytton
- Released: 2004
- Recorded: January 14 and 15, 2003
- Studio: Radio Studio DRS, Zurich, Switzerland
- Genre: Free jazz
- Label: Intakt Records; CD 096
- Producer: Intakt Records

Ithaca is an album by bassist Barry Guy, pianist Marilyn Crispell, and drummer Paul Lytton. It was recorded on January 14 and 15, 2003, at Radio Studio DRS in Zurich, Switzerland, and was released in 2004 by Intakt Records.

== Reception ==
Professional ratings
Review scores
Source	Rating
The Penguin Guide to Jazz	3/4 stars

The authors of the Penguin Guide to Jazz Recordings awarded the album 3 stars, and stated that it "finds the trio sounding... settled and comfortable with each other's idioms. Here, Guy has been influenced in his compositions by the painting of George Vaughan and by the architecture of Daniel Liebeskind and others. Crispell has rarely played better."

In a review for All About Jazz, Andrey Henkin wrote: "Ithaca is another firm entry into European improvised music, replete with all its attendant qualities: superlative musicianship, a full range of textures, and a rational, cerebral approach. Guy continues to expand the vocabulary of the acoustic bass, ably matched by Paul Lytton's abstract notions of rhythm and sound. Crispell... comports herself well given the company, her exuberance driving the more raucous portions and her delicacy coloring the more reserved ones." In a separate AAJ review, Ollie Bivens commented: "The trio is adept in employing silence... creating a sense of anticipation in the listener... This is music where the players must carefully listen to one another or risk stepping over the cliff into a sea of chaos. Ithaca is an enjoyable, if risk-taking disc that draws the listener into its web as three musicians try to push jazz into new frontiers."

Writing for One Final Note, Jason Bivins remarked: "The trio’s empathy, and their consistent strength in a variety of approaches, distinguishes this release from any number of crash-bang-boom recordings out there. A nice one from some old favorites."

== Track listing ==
1. "Fire And Ice" (Guy) – 10:21
2. "Void (For Doris)" (Guy) – 6:37
3. "First Shard" (Guy) – 1:50
4. "Broken Silence" (Guy/Crispell/Lytton) – 6:34
5. "Second Shard" (Guy) – 1:12
6. "Ithaca" (Guy) – 8:47
7. "Zinc" (Guy) – 3:32
8. "Third Shard" (Guy) – 2:42
9. "Unfolding" (Guy/Crispell/Lytton) – 3:56
10. "Zig Zag" (Guy) – 10:08
11. "Klaglied" (Guy) – 4:47

== Personnel ==
- Marilyn Crispell – piano
- Barry Guy – bass
- Paul Lytton – percussion
