= Deep Memory =

Studio album by Barry Guy, Marilyn Crispell, and Paul Lytton
- Released: 2016
- Recorded: May 21, 2015
- Studios: Powerplay Studios, Maur, Switzerland
- Genre: Free jazz
- Labels: Intakt Records; CD 273
- Producers: Intakt records, Patrik Landolt

Deep Memory is an album by bassist Barry Guy, pianist Marilyn Crispell, and drummer Paul Lytton. It was recorded on May 21, 2015, at Powerplay Studios in Maur, Switzerland, and was released in 2016 by Intakt Records. The album features seven compositions by Guy, all named after and inspired by paintings of Hughie O'Donoghue.

== Reception ==
Professional ratings
Review scores
Source	Rating
All About Jazz	4.5/5 stars

In a review for All About Jazz, John Sharpe wrote: "the scored materials here serve as a showcase as much for Crispell as for Guy, in that the bassist's notation exposes not only her fiery unfettered side... but also her gentler side... Lytton... proves a sensitive accompanist, who deploys both precision and power as required. Guy's structures angle the trio somewhere between reflective jazz and robust contemporary classical end points... the end result is absorbing statements that both stimulate the mind and rouse the spirit, often at the same time."

Stuart Broomer, in a review for The Whole Note, stated: "The group intuition here is at an exalted level, as the three take the conventional jazz piano trio into new terrain. It's sometimes hard to distinguish where Guy's compositions end and the collective improvisation begins, motifs sounding elastic in their first appearance... There's a Romantic power and sweep at work here, each piece stretching at emotional constraint."

Greg Buium, writing for Point of Departure, called the album "a marvelous, end-of-the-year gift – another step forward in what is becoming an extraordinary body of work," and commented: "As with so much of Guy’s work, in large groups and small, open and predetermined forms are calibrated with great care. Individually, the performances are especially strong."

In an article for Jazz Views, Chris Baber wrote: "While this is a set of some of the finest improvisers working in contemporary jazz, and there is plenty of energetic soloing from all concerned, what stands out is the way in which the players are completely working together. Each piece feels as if it was composed to provide a clear statement of theme but with enough space for the always excellent Crispell to push her considerable keyboard skills with relish, and for Lytton’s percussion to find the rhythmic spaces and colours around the improvisations... a completely captivating 50 or so minutes of listening."

Derek Taylor of Dusted Magazine remarked: "Certain musical aggregations require nothing in the way of fanfare or advance aggrandizement in reminding the faithful of their immediate and manifold merits. The trio... is one such alloy, an assemblage of world-class improvisers that also count compositional music among their expert forte... the trio's reputation for excellence remains enduringly intact."

== Track listing ==
All compositions by Barry Guy.

1. "Scent" – 6:57
2. "Fallen Angel" – 10:27
3. "Sleeper" – 9:25
4. "Blue Horizon" – 7:12
5. "Return of Ulysses" – 4:21
6. "Silenced Music" – 8:07
7. "Dark Days" – 5:22

== Personnel ==
- Marilyn Crispell – piano
- Barry Guy – bass
- Paul Lytton – drums
