= Phases of the Night =

Studio album by Barry Guy, Marilyn Crispell, and Paul Lytton
- Released: 2008
- Recorded: May 30 and 31, 2007
- Studio: Studio Sound Development, Zürich, Switzerland
- Genre: Free jazz
- Label: Intakt Records; CD 138
- Producer: Intakt Records

Phases of the Night is an album by bassist Barry Guy, pianist Marilyn Crispell, and drummer Paul Lytton. It was recorded on May 30 and 31, 2007, at Studio Sound Development in Zurich, Switzerland, and was released in 2008 by Intakt Records.

The album features performances of four compositions by Guy. Each piece is a reflection or commentary on a painting: "Phases Of The Night" by Max Ernst; "Insomnie" by Dorothea Tanning; "The Invisible Being Embraced" by Wifredo Lam; and "With My Shadow" by Yves Tanguy.

== Reception ==
Professional ratings
Review scores
Source	Rating
DownBeat	4/5 stars
All About Jazz	4.5/5 stars

In a review for DownBeat, Fred Bouchard wrote: "Since the titles themselves are powerfully evocative, it’s safe to say that the portentous content of the works ignited the creative flames of these seasoned improvisers, as their collective imagination runs at a fevered clip through bustling, meticulously crafted collective improvisations... Not recommended for the faint of spirit or the waxy of ear."

Writing for All About Jazz, Nic Jones commented: "Any subversion of the piano trio tradition as manifested in the clinical virtuosity of a technocratic elite is always welcome, and it's present here in abundance. This is not however to suggest that this trio lacks technique, it's just that the music they produce is so free of the constraints of any overt tradition that the results are compelling... The effect overall is of a deeply empathetic trio coming to terms with the moment with the aid of prepared material that's anything but inhibiting."

Paris Transatlantic's Nate Dorward stated: "This is (compositionally-assisted) free improv in the grand manner, almost disconcertingly free of the gap between thought and action that's central to so much improvised music... Which isn't to say that lightning reflexes and absolute certitude/commitment aren't themselves exciting to listen to, of course. The result here is an awesome collision of spirits, and the players effortlessly handle these four big musical canvases with due attention both to the explosive power of individual gestures and to the way these contribute to the larger whole."

== Track listing ==
All compositions by Barry Guy.

1. "Phases of the Night" – 16:49
2. "Insomnie" – 8:58
3. "The Invisible Being Embraced" – 12:47
4. "With My Shadow" – 14:30

== Personnel ==
- Marilyn Crispell – piano
- Barry Guy – bass
- Paul Lytton – drums
