= Drawn Inward =

Studio album by Evan Parker Electro-Acoustic Ensemble
- Released: 1999
- Recorded: December 1998
- Studio: Gateway Studios; Kingston, England
- Genre: Jazz
- Length: 65:16
- Label: ECM; ECM 1693
- Producer: Steve Lake

Evan Parker chronology
Chicago Tenor Duets (2002)	Drawn Inward (1999)	At the Vortex (1996) (1996)

Evan Parker Electro-Acoustic Ensemble chronology
Toward the Margins (1997)	Drawn Inward (1999)	Memory/Vision (2003)

Drawn Inward is an album by the Evan Parker Electro-Acoustic Ensemble recorded in December 1998 and released on ECM the following year.

== Reception ==
Professional ratings
Review scores
Source	Rating
AllMusic	4/5 stars
The Penguin Guide to Jazz Recordings	3.5/4 stars
All About Jazz	3.5/5 stars

The authors of the Penguin Guide to Jazz Recordings wrote: "this is very much a collaborative project and not just an Evan Parker project. Wachsmann and Guy are absolutely central to the multi-dimensional harmonic language, while Lytton's percussion is ever more subtly dramatic." The AllMusic review by Steve Loewy awarded the album 4 stars stating:

Evan Parker has performed in so many contexts, but he seems to have hit a particular stride with his Electro-Acoustic Ensemble, a strange combination of saxophones, strings, and electronics. What makes this so exceedingly attractive is the continuous wonder that permeates throughout... Parker fans that have not heard this group before may be surprised at the results. Although the saxophonist embraces his now well-known advanced techniques, they are clearly subordinate to the project. At times there is a busy intensity to it all, at others a serene quality. Highly complex strokes for an increasingly intricate society, perhaps, where moods change and so do their contexts. Don't file under easy listening.

Writing for All About Jazz, Glenn Astarita commented: "On many occasions, the musicians invoke the sensation of performing on some sort of imaginary plane as the music stretches outward or conveys a truly expansive landscape that seems infinite or unending... here are no preordained ground rules as the exhaustive intercommunication, inexplicable themes and unique phraseology should supply enough data or stimulus to keep us pondering for a good 65 minutes or so."

== Track listing ==
All compositions by Evan Parker except as indicated

1. "The Crooner (For Johnny Hartman)" (Evan Parker, Philipp Wachsmann) - 9:13
2. "Serpent in Sky" - 7:30
3. "Travel in the Homeland" (Paul Lytton) - 7:58
4. "Spouting Bowl" (Lawrence Casserley) - 2:56
5. "Collect Calls (Milano-Kingston) (Bugged)" (Parker, Walter Prati) - 10:38
6. "a.k.a. Lotan" (Parker, Wachsmann) - 4:24
7. "Reanascreena" (Barry Guy) - 5:43
8. "At Home in the Universe (For Stuart Kauffman)" - 3:20
9. "Writing on Ice" (Wachsmann) - 3:43
10. "Phloy in the Frame" (Parker, Lytton) - 3:49
11. "DrawnInward" - 5:59

== Personnel ==
=== Evan Parker Electro-Acoustic Ensemble ===
- Evan Parker – tenor and soprano saxophones, khene
- Barry Guy – double bass
- Paul Lytton – percussion, live-electronics
- Philipp Wachsmann – violin, viola, live electronics, sound processing
- Walter Prati – live electronics, sound processing
- Marco Vecchi – live electronics, sound processing
