= Toward the Margins =

Studio album by the Evan Parker Electro-Acoustic Ensemble
- Released: 1997
- Recorded: May 1996
- Studio: Gateway Studios; London, England
- Genre: Jazz
- Length: 60:40
- Label: ECM New Series; ECM 1612
- Producer: Steve Lake

Evan Parker chronology
Natives and Aliens (1996)	Toward the Margins (1997)	At the Vortex (1996)

Evan Parker Electro-Acoustic Ensemble chronology
Toward the Margins (1997)	Drawn Inward (1999)

Toward the Margins is an album by the Evan Parker Electro-Acoustic Ensemble, recorded in 1996 and released on the ECM New Series the following year.

== Reception ==
Professional ratings
Review scores
Source	Rating
AllMusic	4/5 stars
The Penguin Guide to Jazz Recordings	4/4 stars

The AllMusic review by Steve Loewy stated: "Founded in 1992, Evan Parker's Electro-Acoustic Ensemble is a highly sophisticated grouping, which for this recording conceptually pairs three acoustic musicians with electronic tone manipulators... It is all fascinating stuff, and if it does not swing or fit into any easy definitions of 'jazz,' it takes the concept of improvisation to a new level. There is sometimes an aimlessness to it all that can be off-putting, but concentrated listening can produce wonderful rewards for the patient consumer."

The authors of the Penguin Guide to Jazz Recordings awarded the album 4 stars, and wrote: "This was an exciting step in Parker's progress, magnificently recorded and mastered, and compelling from start to finish."

A reviewer for Gramophone commented: "there's a paradox inherent in the high levels of control traditionally associated with electro-acoustic music being imposed upon a genre having an aesthetic tradition which tends to emphasize moment-by-moment interaction and instant composition, but the music which results is proud of its mixed parentage... this disc represents an interesting area of progress for the European avant-garde."

Peter Margasak, writing for the Chicago Reader, stated: "On... Toward the Margins... Parker, Guy, Lytton, and violinist Phil Wachsmann improvise cumulous swirls of sound that get processed by electronicists... Walter Prati and Marco Vecchi and then folded back into the din–yet the saxist's grainy, concentrated melodic tendrils and patiently etched arcs are immediately recognizable."

== Track listing ==
All compositions by Evan Parker except as indicated

1. "Toward the Margins" (Barry Guy, Evan Parker, Philipp Wachsmann) – 4:34
2. "Turbulent Mirror" – 5:54
3. "Field and Figure" (Guy, Parker) – 7:06
4. "The Regenerative Landscape (For AMM)" – 3:36
5. "Chain of Chance" (Marco Vecchi, Paul Lytton, Walter Prati) – 4:19
6. "Trahütten" (Parker, Wachsmann) – 6:20
7. "Shadow Without an Object: Engagement/Reversal/Displacement" (Guy, Parker, Vecchi, Lytton, Wachsmann, Prati) – 6:02
8. "Epanados" (Guy, Parker, Vecchi, Lytton, Wachsmann, Prati) – 4:29
9. "Born Cross-Eyed (Remembering Fuller)" (Lytton) – 2:52
10. "Philipp's Pavilion" (Parker, Wachsmann) – 7:33
11. "The Hundred Books (For Idries Shah)" – 4:09
12. "Contra-Dance" (Guy, Parker) – 3:38

== Personnel ==
=== Evan Parker Electro-Acoustic Ensemble ===
- Evan Parker – soprano saxophone
- Barry Guy – double bass
- Paul Lytton – percussion, live-electronics
- Philipp Wachsmann – violin, viola, live electronics, sound processing
- Walter Prati – live electronics, sound processing
- Marco Vecchi – live electronics, sound processing
