= What/If/They Both Could Fly =

Live album by Evan Parker and Joe McPhee
- Released: 22 November 2013
- Recorded: 6 July 2012 at the Kongsberg Jazzfestival in Norway
- Genre: Jazz
- Length: 39:11
- Label: Rune Grammofon RLP/RCD3149

Joe McPhee chronology
Sonic Elements (2012)	What/If/They Both Could Fly (2013)	Human Encore (2013)

Evan Parker chronology
Rocket Science (2012)	What/If/They Both Could Fly (2012)	Either Or And (2013)

What/If/They Both Could Fly is a live album by Evan Parker and Joe McPhee recorded Norway in 2012 and released on the Norwegian Rune Grammofon label.

== Reception ==
Professional ratings
Review scores
Source	Rating
AllMusic	3.5/5 stars
The Guardian	4/5 stars
DownBeat	4.5/5 stars

AllMusic reviewer Thom Jurek stated "For fans of improvised music, What/If/They Both Could Fly has much to offer. For seasoned listeners, it will not likely reveal many hidden new doors, but it is enjoyable and engaging for its lively interplay, presented in a relaxed, open, and inquisitive fashion".

In The Guardian, John Fordham wrote "It's a must for free-jazz disciples of Parker and McPhee, but the uninitiated may also find much to enjoy in this gracefully rational and divertingly varied exhibition of improv".

DownBeat reviewer Bill Meyer commented: "Nothing about this 2012 performance, recorded... when saxophonist Evan Parker was 68 and saxophonist-trumpeter Joe McPhee was 73, sounds like the work of musicians who are anywhere short of the top of their game... they sound quite in tune with each other, whether adding to one another's ideas or holding back to give the other space."

== Track listing ==
All compositions by Evan Parker and Joe McPhee

1. "What" - 18:52
2. "If" - 13:54
3. "They Both Could Fly" - 6:25

== Personnel ==
- Evan Parker - tenor saxophone
- Joe McPhee - soprano saxophone, pocket trumpet
