= Atlanta (Evan Parker album) =

Live album by Evan Parker
- Released: 1990
- Recorded: December 12, 1986
- Venues: Atlanta, Georgia
- Genre: Free jazz
- Length: 1:12:19
- Labels: Impetus Records; IMP LP 18617

Atlanta (spelled Atlăn′tă on the album cover) is a live album by saxophonist Evan Parker. It was recorded in December 1986 in Atlanta, Georgia, and was released by Impetus Records in 1990. On the album, Parker is joined by bassist Barry Guy and drummer Paul Lytton.

== Reception ==
Professional ratings
Review scores
Source	Rating
AllMusic	4/5 stars
The Penguin Guide to Jazz	4/4 stars

In a review for AllMusic, Thom Jurek wrote: "Parker's interplay with his rhythm section is akin to a rough dancer skidding along the floor to a graceful, elegant orchestra. The interplay between Guy and Lytton is so mesmerizing, so completely self-contained, it's Parker who has to focus on them or he'll be lost in the glorious tumult. The rhythmic communication... is breathtaking. As for Parker, there is little to say except that, despite having to be very physical on this evening, he was aware of everything, offering whatever color and shape, whatever texture or fragment that might be useful to the rhythmic dance, though he was the frontman. This is a must-have for fans of this trio."

The authors of The Penguin Guide to Jazz awarded the album 4 stars, and stated: "Here Parker has refined and simplified his small-group playing to the point where one can almost reconstruct the possibility... of melody. This is one of the most accessible documents he has ever issued, the one most likely to appeal to listeners devoted to jazz and suspicious of anything that departs from chords. Guy and Lytton fulfil every expectation of a conventional bass-and-drums configuration without once touching fixed base."

Writing for All About Jazz, John Eyles commented: "There is no shortage of recordings relating to this trio. Atlanta... is one of the best places to begin investigating it. As always, it is not a sax-plus-rhythm-section trio but an exchange between three equals."

Lawrence Joseph wrote: "Like the classic John Coltrane Quartet, there is an advantage to knowing your partners well; extra freedom and risk taking abilities are gained from the knowledge that your band mates are willing and able to follow you anywhere... In the hope that others will experience the revelations this group brought to me, I strongly recommend this CD as a way into British free improvisation."

== Track listing ==
1. "Atlanta" – 25:19
2. "Two In One" – 9:03
3. "The Snake As Road Sign (For Elias Canetti)" – 17:05
4. "Geometry" – 20:47

== Personnel ==
- Evan Parker – tenor saxophone, soprano saxophone
- Barry Guy – bass
- Paul Lytton – drums, percussion
