= English Suites (album) =

Studio album by Paul Lytton and Ken Vandermark
- Released: 2000
- Recorded: January 11; November 20, 1999
- Studio: Chicago, United States; Hasselt, Belgium
- Genre: Free improvisation
- Label: Wobbly Rail; WOB009

English Suites is a double album by percussionist and electronic musician Paul Lytton and reed player Ken Vandermark. Disc 1 was recorded on January 11, 1999, in a Chicago studio, while disc 2 was recorded on November 20, 1999, at a concert in Hasselt, Belgium. The album was released on CD in 2000 by Wobbly Rail, an imprint of Merge Records.

== Reception ==
Professional ratings
Review scores
| Source | Rating |
|---|---|
| AllMusic | 1.5/5 stars |
| Tom Hull – on the Web | B+ |
| The Virgin Encyclopedia of Jazz | 3/5 stars |

In a review for All About Jazz, Micah Holmquist wrote: "The two pair up... with fine results... English Suites would serve as a good introduction to Lytton's work and any fan of either Vandermark or Lytton will want to pick it up."

Ken Waxman of JazzWord called the album "a good, but not great session that will probably be appreciated by many improv followers," and stated that the track titled "Stage 3" sounds "as if the percussionist was slowly working his way through a junk pile as Vandermark outputs consistent saxophone blats sounding just this side of Big Jay McNeely."

Writing for AllMusic, Scott Yanow described the music as "pretty unlistenable," "abrasive," and "jarring." He commented: "Some of the music is comprised of very intense sound explorations while at other times the sparse setting leads to some introspection, space, and long tones. The problem is that very little development takes place and none of the individual pieces... stick in one's mind."

== Track listing ==
Composed by Paul Lytton and Ken Vandermark.

CD 1

1. "Radio 1" – 10:04
2. "Radio 2" – 13:17
3. "Radio 3" – 6:04
4. "Radio 4" – 3:40
5. "Radio 5" – 11:56
6. "Radio 6" – 5:55
7. "Radio 7" – 8:16

CD 2

1. "Set One: Film 1" – 4:58
2. "Set One: Film 2" – 9:17
3. "Set One: Film 3" – 6:39
4. "Set One: Film 4" – 5:22
5. "Set One: Film 5" – 4:54
6. "Set One: Film 6" – 8:26
7. "Set One: Film 7" – 9:39
8. "Set Two: Stage 1" – 5:36
9. "Set Two: Stage 2" – 7:23
10. "Set Two: Stage 3" – 4:38
11. "Set Two: Stage 4" – 4:00
12. "Set Two: Stage 5" – 2:45

== Personnel ==
- Paul Lytton – drums, percussion, electronics
- Ken Vandermark – reeds
