= Evan Parker =

British saxophone player (born 1944)

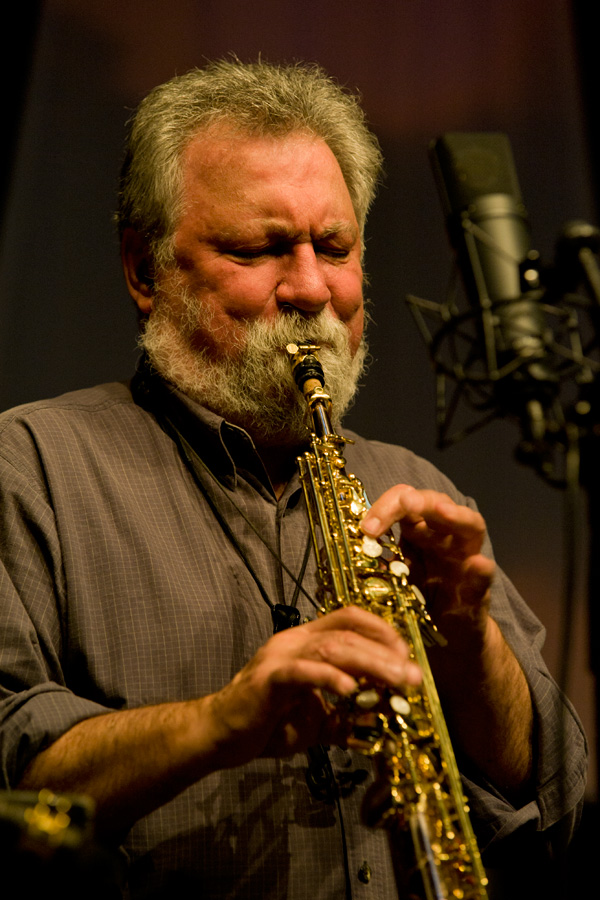
- Moers Festival, 2012

Background information
- Born: Evan Shaw Parker; 5 April 1944 (age 82); Bristol, England
- Genres: free improvisation, free jazz
- Occupation: Musician
- Instruments: Tenor and soprano saxophone
- Labels: Psi, Emanem FMP, Clean Feed, Incus, Leo, Rune Grammofon, Tzadik
- Website: www.evanparker.com

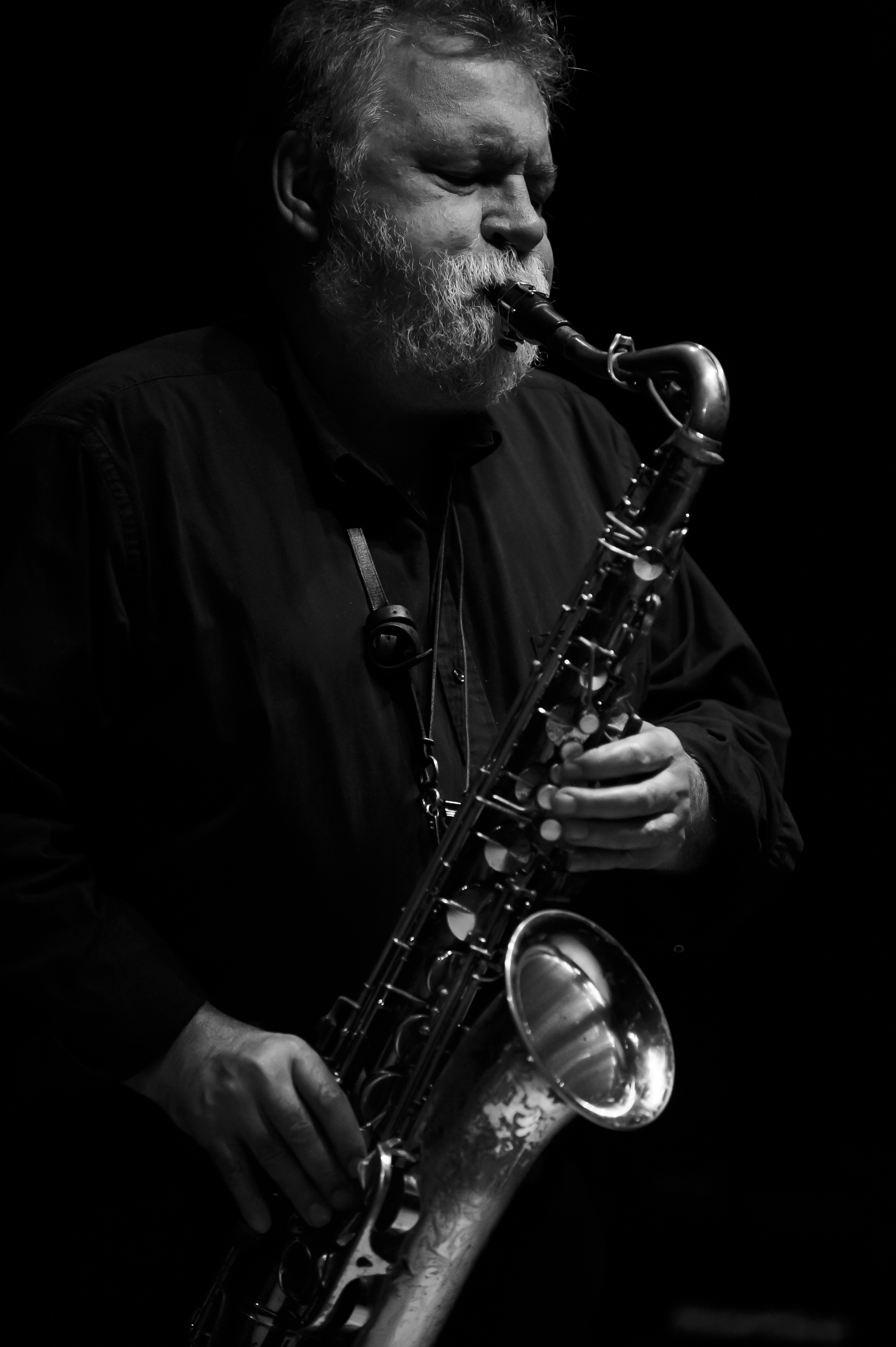
Evan Parker, Buffalo, New York (2009)

Evan Shaw Parker (born 5 April 1944) is a British tenor and soprano saxophone player who plays free improvisation.

Recording and performing with many collaborators, Parker was a pivotal figure in the development of European free jazz and free improvisation. He has pioneered or substantially expanded an array of extended techniques. Critic Ron Wynn describes Parker as "among Europe's most innovative and intriguing saxophonists...his solo sax work isn't for the weak."

== Early influences ==
Parker's original inspiration was Paul Desmond. Parker soon discovered the music of John Coltrane, who would be the primary influence throughout his career. Other important early influences were free jazz artists Cecil Taylor, Albert Ayler and Jimmy Giuffre. Since the 1990s the influence of cool jazz saxophone players has also become apparent in his music, with Parker recording tributes to Warne Marsh and Lee Konitz on Time Will Tell (ECM, 1993) and Chicago Solo (Okka Disk, 1997).

== Early career ==
Parker moved to London in 1966 and quickly became a part of the city’s improvised music scene based around the Little Theatre Club, joining John Stevens’ Spontaneous Music Ensemble. Along with guitarist Derek Bailey, he quickly became a leading figure in the improvised music movement in London and throughout Europe. One of his most lasting connections was with German pianist Alexander von Schlippenbach, whose trio he joined in 1970.

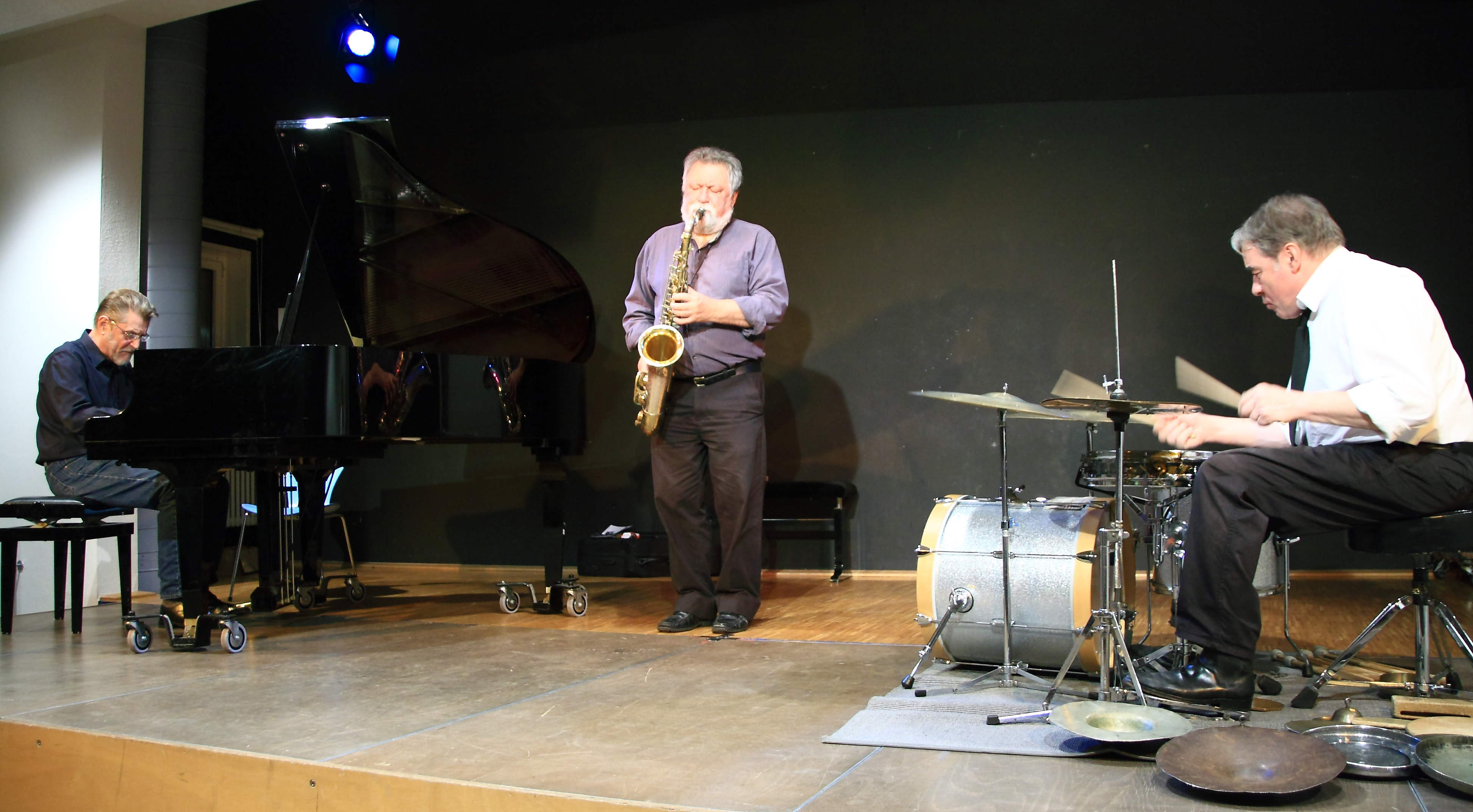
The Alexander von Schlippenbach-Trio with Paul Lovens on the occasion of its 40 birthday in 2010 in Niederstetten (Germany)

== Solo soprano ==
Visualization of Auditory Streaming

Parker is perhaps best known for his solo performances. Originally dismissive of solo performance as being too close in nature to traditional composition, he was inspired to experiment with solo performance by the possibilities for musician-instrument interaction demonstrated by Derek Bailey’s solo guitar improvisations. Primarily using the soprano saxophone for these solo performances, the music makes use of a principle known as auditory streaming, where the use of wide registers creates the illusion of polyphony, which Parker terms “pseudo-polyphony”. This effect is achieved primarily by using multiphonics or harmonics in combination with circular breathing, polyrhythmic fingering, and split tonguing.

== Electronic music ==
Working with electronic music since the early days of the Spontaneous Music Ensemble or with his duo with Paul Lytton, Parker has become increasingly interested in electronics, usually through inviting collaborators such as Phil Wachsmann, Walter Prati, Joel Ryan, Lawrence Casserley, Sam Pluta or Matthew Wright to process his playing electronically, creating a feedback loop and shifting soundscape. His various Electro-Acoustic Ensembles are a showcase for this area of his work, as well as the Trance Map project with Matthew Wight, which has included improvised live events across Europe and the US, involving other invited guest performers, with various Trance Map+ recordings released on Psi, Intakt and FMR Records.

== Later career and recordings ==
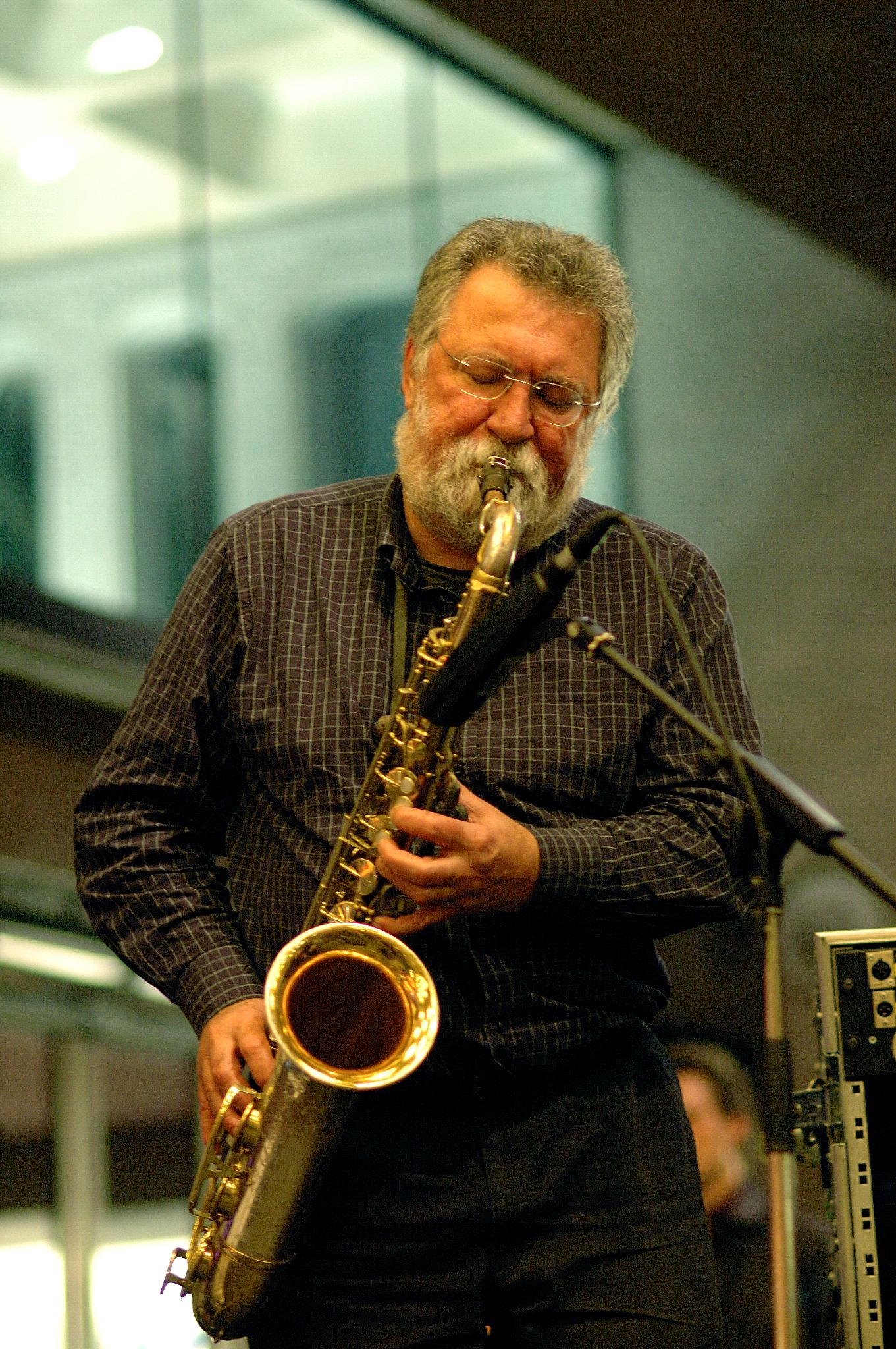
Evan Parker, 2005

Parker has recorded a large number of albums both solo or as a group leader, and has recorded or performed with Peter Brötzmann, Michael Nyman, John Stevens, Derek Bailey, Keith Rowe, Joe McPhee, Anthony Braxton, Cecil Taylor, John Zorn, Fred Frith, Bill Laswell, Ikue Mori, Thurston Moore, Cyro Baptista, Milford Graves, George E. Lewis, Tim Berne, Mark Dresser, Dave Holland, Sylvie Courvoisier, and many others. Two key associations have been pianist Alexander von Schlippenbach's trio with Parker and drummer Paul Lovens (documented on recordings such as Pakistani Pomade and Elf Bagatellen) and a trio with bassist Barry Guy and drummer Paul Lytton. On Parker's 50th birthday, these two bands played a set apiece at a London concert; the results were issued by Leo Records as the 50th Birthday Concert.

Parker, Bailey, and Tony Oxley founded Incus Records in 1970. The label continued under Bailey's sole control after a falling-out between Bailey and Parker in the early 1980s, Oxley having left earlier. Parker curates Psi Records, which was issued by Martin Davidson's Emanem Records.

From 1999 to 2007 Parker co-ordinated, recorded and played in the Free Zone at the Appleby Jazz Festival, held in Cumbria, England. The recordings were issued through his Psi record label.

Although Parker's focus is free improvisation, he has appeared in conventional jazz contexts, such as Charlie Watts's big band and Kenny Wheeler's ensembles and participated in Gavin Bryars's recording After the Requiem, performing the composition "Alaric I or II" as part of a saxophone quartet.

Parker contributed to David Sylvian's albums Manafon and Died in the Wool.

Parker marked his 80th birthday with a three-concert series at Cafe Oto, London (April 2024) and The Heraclitean Two-Step, etc. (4CDs of solo performances with a 120 page book; on False Walls).

== Pop music ==
He also has appeared in pop-music contexts: on Scott Walker's 1984 Climate of Hunter, and on dub-influenced albums with Jah Wobble, the adventurous drum n bass duo Spring Heel Jack and rock group Spiritualized. He appeared on the b-side to Vic Reeves and The Wonderstuff's UK 1991 number-one hit "Dizzy", performing saxophone on "Oh, Mr Songwriter" (based on Vic Reeves Big Night Out TV show end theme song). At one point during a sax solo, Vic can be heard shouting: "Pack it in, Parker!"

Parker has also made notable appearances on record with Robert Wyatt.

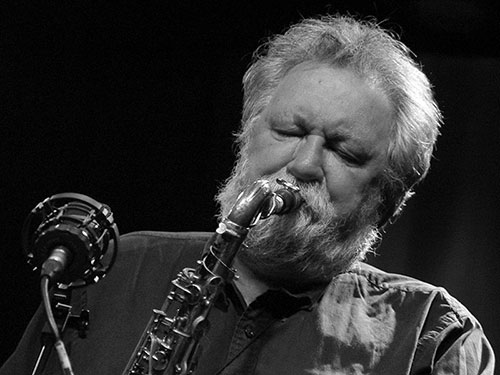
Evan Parker playing in Aarhus, Denmark, 2010

== Discography ==
=== As leader/co-leader ===
- The Topography of the Lungs (Incus, 1970) with Derek Bailey and Han Bennink
- The Music Improvisation Company 1968-1971 (Incus, 1968–70 [1976]) with Derek Bailey, Hugh Davies and Jamie Muir
- The Music Improvisation Company (ECM, 1970) with Derek Bailey, Hugh Davies, Jamie Muir and Christine Jeffrey
- Collective Calls (Urban) (Two Microphones) (Incus, 1972) with Paul Lytton
- At the Unity Theatre (Incus, 1975) with Paul Lytton
- Saxophone Solos (Incus, 1976)
- Monoceros (Incus, 1978)
- Six of One (Incus, 1980 [1982])
- Incision with Barry Guy (FMP, 1980)
- From Saxophone & Trombone (Incus (1980); Psi (2002); Otoroku (2023)) with George Lewis
- Tracks (Incus, 1983)

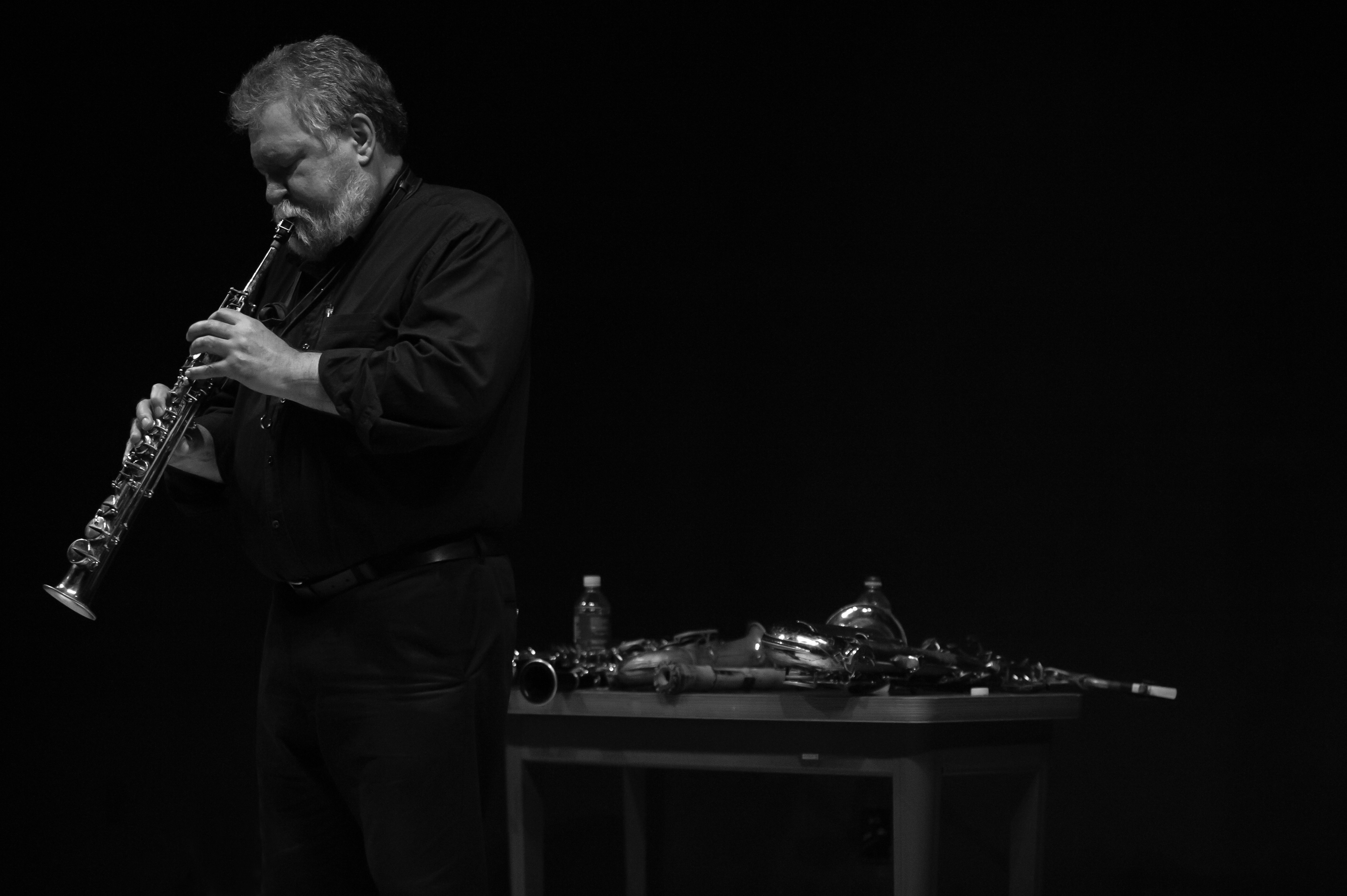
Evan Parker, Buffalo, New York

- Hook, Drift & Shuffle (Incus, 1985)
- The Snake Decides (Incus, 1986)
- Atlanta (Impetus, 1990)
- Process and Reality (FMP, 1991)
- Three Blokes (FMP, 1992 [1994]) with Lol Coxhill and Steve Lacy
- Conic Sections (AhUm, 1993)
- Synergenics - Phonomanie III (Leo, 1993)
- Corner to Corner (Ogun, 1993 [1995]) with John Stevens
- Birmingham Concert (Rare Music, 1993 [1996])
- Imaginary Values with Barry Guy and Paul Lytton (Maya, 1994)
- 50th Birthday Concert (Leo, 1994)
- Obliquities with Barry Guy (Maya, 1995)
- The Redwood Session (CIMP, 1995) with Joe McPhee
- Breaths and Heartbeats with Barry Guy and Paul Lytton (Rastacan, 1995)
- McPhee/Parker/Lazro (Vand'Oeuvre, 1996) with Joe McPhee and Daunik Lazro
- Tempranillo (Nova Era, 1996) with Agustí Fernández
- Chicago Solo (Okka Disk, 1995)
- London Air Lift (FMP, 1996)
- At the Vortex with Barry Guy and Paul Lytton (Emanem, 1996)
- Toward the Margins (ECM, 1996)
- Monkey Puzzle (Leo, 1997) with Ned Rothenberg
- Natives and Aliens (Leo, 1997) with Barry Guy, Paul Lytton, and Marilyn Crispell
- Most Materiall (Matchless, 1997) with Eddie Prévost
- Unity Variations (Okka Disk, 1999) with Georg Gräwe
- Drawn Inward (ECM, 1999)
- Foxes Fox (Emanem, 1999) with Steve Beresford, John Edwards, and Louis Moholo
- After Appleby (Leo, 2000) with Barry Guy, Paul Lytton, and Marilyn Crispell
- Lines Burnt in Light (Psi, 2001)
- Passage to Hades (30 Hz, 2001) with Jah Wobble
- The Ayes Have It (Emanem, 2001)
- Chicago Tenor Duets (Okka Disk, 2002) with Joe McPhee
- Memory/Vision (ECM, 2002)
- Set (Psi, 2003)
- Birds and Blades (Intakt, 2003) with Barry Guy
- America 2003 (Psi, 2004) with Alexander von Schlippenbach and Paul Lytton
- The Eleventh Hour (ECM, 2004)
- Boustrophedon (ECM, 2004)
- The Bishop's Move (Les Disques Victo, 2004)
- Naan Tso (Psi, 2005) with Foxes Fox (Parker, Steve Beresford, John Edwards, and Louis Moholo-Moholo)
- Crossing the River (Psi, 2005)
- Time Lapse (Tzadik, 2006)
- Zafiro (Maya, 2006)
- The Moment's Energy (ECM, 2007)
- A Glancing Blow (Clean Feed, 2007) with John Edwards, Chris Corsano
- Whitstable Solo (Psi, 2008)
- House Full of Floors (Tzadik, 2009)
- Psalms (Psi, 2010) with Sten Sandell
- Scenes in the House of Music (Clean Feed, 2010)
- Nightwork (Marge, 2010)
- Round About One O'Clock (Not Two, 2011) with Zlatko Kaucic
- The Bleeding Edge (Psi, 2011) with Okkyung Lee, Peter Evans
- The Voice is One (Not Two, 2012) with Agustí Fernández
- Hasselt (Psi, 2012)
- Dortmund Variations (Nuscope, 2012) with Georg Gräwe
- Rex, Wrecks & XXX (RogueArt, 2013) with Matthew Shipp
- Live at Maya Recordings Festival (NoBusiness, 2013)
- Rocket Science (More is More, 2013)
- What/If/They Both Could Fly (Rune Grammofon, 2013) with Joe McPhee
- Either Or And (Relative Pitch, 2014) with Sylvie Courvoisier
- Seven (Victo, 2014)
- Extremes (Red Toucan, 2014) with Paul Dunmall, Tony Bianco
- Ninth Square (Clean Feed, 2015) with Joe Morris, Nate Wooley
- As the Wind (Psi, 2016)
- Music for David Mossman: Live at Vortex London (Intakt, 2018) with Barry Guy and Paul Lytton
- Then Through Now (False Walls, 2022) with Henry Dagg
- The Heraclitean Two-Step, etc. (4 CDs and book; False Walls, 2024)
- Branches (Otoruko / Open Mouth, 2025) with Bill Nace
- May Spring Last a Lifetime (False Walls, 2026) with Tom Challenger
- Those Landings (Tzadik, 2026) with John Zorn

With Derek Bailey

- The London Concert (Incus, 1976)
- Compatibles (Incus, 1986)
- Arch Duo (Rastascan, 1999)

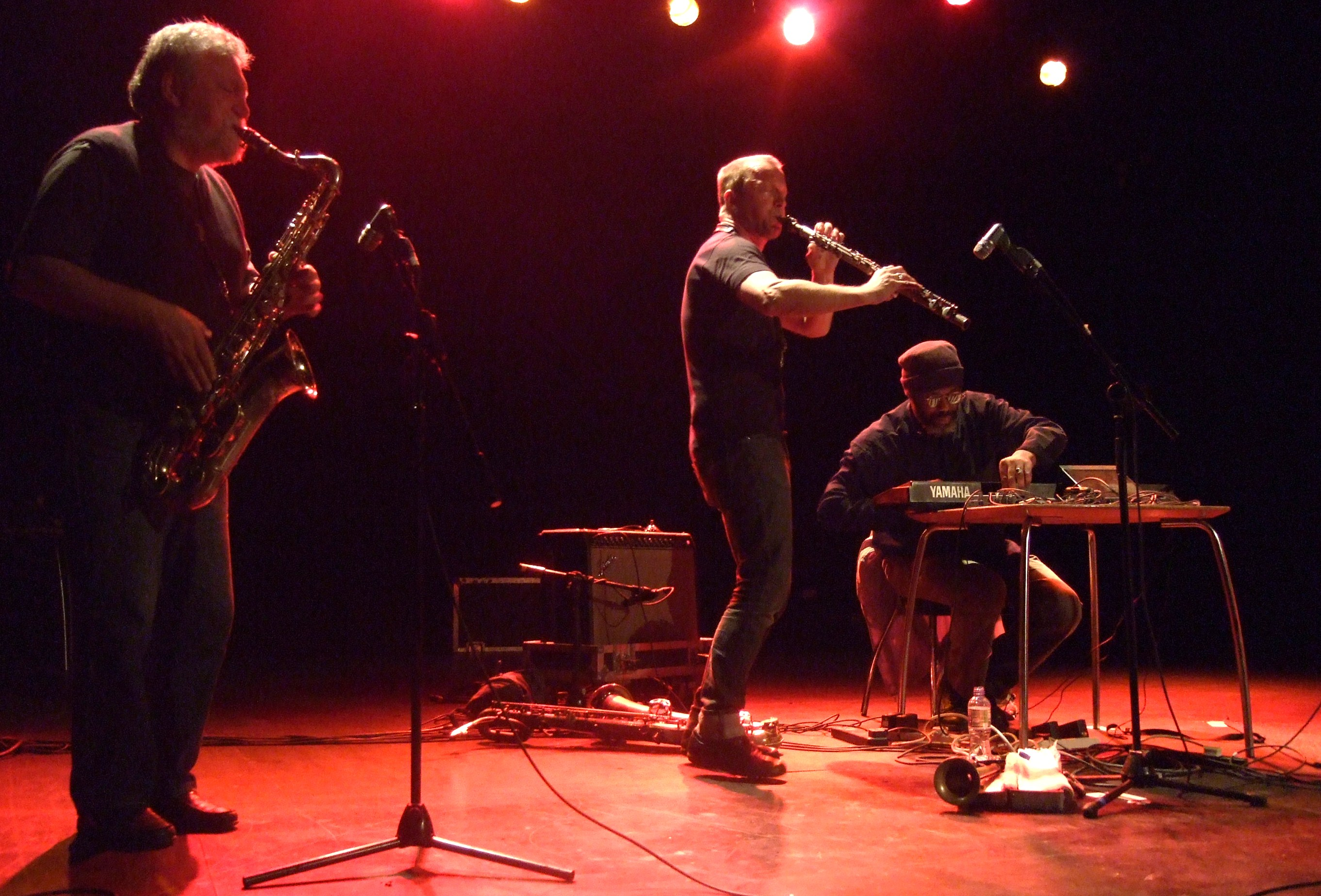
Evan Parker with Mats Gustafsson and Pat Thomas in 2008

=== As sideman ===
With Han Bennink

- The Grass is Greener (Psi, 2000)

With Borah Bergman

- The Fire Tale (Soul Note, 1994)

With Paul Bley

- Time Will Tell (ECM, 1994)
- Sankt Gerold (ECM, 2000)

With Anthony Braxton

- Ensemble (Victoriaville) 1988 (Victo, 1988 [1992])
- Duo (London) 1993 (Leo, 1993)
- Trio (London) 1993 (Leo, 1993)

With Peter Brötzmann

- Machine Gun (FMP, 1968)
- Nipples (Calig, 1969)
- Fuck de Boere (Atavistic, 2001) recorded in 1968 and 1970

With Gavin Bryars

- After the Requiem (ECM, 1991)

With Lawrence Casserley

- Solar Wind (Touch, 1997)
- Dividuality (Maya, 1997)

With Alvin Curran

- In Real Time (Ictus, 1978)

With Pierre Favre

- Pierre Favre Quartet (Wergo, 1970)

With Joe Gallivan

- Innocence (Cadence, 1992)

With the Globe Unity Orchestra

- Hamburg 1974 (FMP, 1974)
- Rumbling (FMP, 1976)
- Pearls (FMP, 1977)
- Jahrmarkt/Local Fair (Po Torch, 1977)
- Improvisations (JAPO, 1978)
- Compositions (JAPO 1979)
- Intergalactic Blow (JAPO, 1982)
- 20th Anniversary (FMP, 1986)
- Globe Unity 2002 (Intakt, 2002)

With Barry Guy/The London Jazz Composers' Orchestra

- Ode (Incus, 1972)
- Study II/Stringer (Intakt, 1980–91)
- Stringer (1984)
- Zurich Concerts (Intakt, 1987–88)
- Harmos (Intakt, 1989)
- Double Trouble (Intakt, 1990)
- Theoria (Intakt, 1991)
- Portraits (Intakt, 1993)
- Three Pieces for Orchestra (Intakt, 1995)
- Double Trouble Two (Intakt, 1998)
- Radio Rondo/Schaffhausen Concert (Intakt, 2009)
- That Time (Not Two, 2020)

With the Barry Guy New Orchestra

- Inscape–Tableaux (Intakt, 2001)
- Oort–Entropy (Intakt, 2005)

With Kip Hanrahan

- Paul Haines – Darn It! (American Clavé, 1993)

With Dave Holland

- Uncharted Territories (Dare2, 2018)

With Tony Hymas - Barney Bush

- Left for Dead (nato, 1995)

With Steve Lacy

- Saxophone Special (Emanem, 1975)
- Chirps (FMP, 1985)
- Three Blokes with Lol Coxhill (FMP, 1994)

With Chris McGregor

- Chris McGregor Septet. Up to Earth, 1969 (Fledg'ling, 2008)
- Chris McGregor's Brotherhood of Breath Travelling Somewhere, 1973 (Cuneiform, 2001)
- Chris McGregor's Brotherhood of Breath Live at Willisau, 1973 (Ogun, 1974)
- Chris McGregor's Brotherhood of Breath Procession (Ogun, 1978)
- Chris McGregor's Brotherhood of Breath Bremen to Bridgwater, 1971 and 1975 (Cuneiform, 2004)

With Roscoe Mitchell

- Composition/Improvisation Nos. 1, 2 & 3 (ECM, 2004)

With Louis Moholo

- Spirits Rejoice! (Ogun, 1978)
- Bush Fire (Ogun, 1995)

With The Music Improvisation Company

- The Music Improvisation Company (ECM, 1970)
- The Music Improvisation Company 1968-1971 (Incus, 1976)

With Natural Information Society

- descension (Out of Our Constrictions) (Eremite/Aguirre, 2021)

With Michael Nyman

- Michael Nyman (Piano, 1981)

With Tony Oxley

- The Baptised Traveller (CBS, 1969)
- 4 Compositions for Sextet (CBS, 1970)
- Ichnos (RCA, 1971)
- Tony Oxley (Incus, 1975)

With Jean-François Pauvros

- Master Attack (nato, 1987)

With Paul Rutherford and Iskra 1912

- Sequences 72 & 73 (Emanem, 1997)

With Alexander von Schlippenbach

- Pakistani Pomade (FMP, 1973)
- Three Nails Left (FMP, 1975)
- The Hidden Peak (FMP, 1977)
- Detto fra de Noi (Po Torch, 1982)
- Anticlockwise (FMP, 1983)
- Das Hohe Lied (Po Torch, 1991)
- Elf Bagatellen (FMP, 1991)
- The Morlocks and Other Pieces (FMP, 1994) with the Berlin Contemporary Jazz Orchestra
- Physics (FMP, 1996)
- Live in Japan '96 (DIW, 1997) with the Berlin Contemporary Jazz Orchestra
- Complete Combustion (FMP, 1998)
- Swinging the Bim (FMP, 1998)
- Gold is Where You Find It (Intakt, 2007)

With Manfred Schoof

- European Echoes (FMP, 1969)

With Setoladimaiale Unit

- Live at Angelica 2018 (Setola di Maiale, 2019)

With the Spontaneous Music Ensemble

- Karyobin (Island, 1968)
- Quintessence (Emanem, 1974 [1986])

With Spring Heel Jack

- Masses (Thirsty Ear, 2001)
- Amassed (Thirsty Ear, 2002)
- Live (Thirsty Ear, 2003)
- The Sweetness of the Water (Thirsty Ear, 2004)

With David Sylvian

- Manafon (Samadhi Sound, 2009)
- Died in the Wool – Manafon Variations (Samadhi Sound, 2011)

with Cecil Taylor

- The Hearth (FMP, 1988)
- Alms/Tiergarten (Spree) (FMP, 1988)
- Melancholy (FMP, 1990)
- Nailed (FMP, 1990)

With Stan Tracey

- Suspensions and Anticipations (Psi, 2003)
- Crevulations (Psi, 2005)

With Trance Map

- Marconi's Drift by Transatlantic Trance Map (False Walls, 2024)

With Scott Walker

- Climate of Hunter (Virgin, 1984)

With Charlie Watts

- Vol pour Sidney (nato, 1991)

With Kenny Wheeler

- Song for Someone (Incus, 1973)
- Around 6 (ECM, 1979)
- Music for Large & Small Ensembles (ECM, 1990)

With Robert Wyatt

- Shleep (Hannibal, 1997)
