= Unity Variations =

Live album by Evan Parker and Georg Gräwe
- Released: 1999
- Recorded: May 9, 1998
- Venue: Unity Temple, Oak Park, Illinois
- Genre: Jazz
- Length: 54:46
- Label: Okka Disk
- Producer: John Corbett

Evan Parker chronology
| Monkey Puzzle (1997) | Unity Variations (1999) | Chicago Tenor Duets (2002) |

Unity Variations is an album by British jazz saxophonist Evan Parker and German pianist Georg Gräwe, which was recorded in 1998 during the Empty Bottle Festival of Jazz and Improvised Music and released on Okka Disk. Before this live performance, they had played in duo just once before at the 1991 October Meeting at the Bimhuis in Amsterdam.

== Reception ==
Professional ratings
Review scores
| Source | Rating |
|---|---|
| AllMusic | 3/5 stars |
| The Penguin Guide to Jazz Recordings | 2.5/4 stars |

In her review for AllMusic, Joslyn Layne states "This excellent performance showcases the very complementary interaction of the duo, the sort of interaction that often becomes a feat of close listening even while playing without pause."

The authors of the Penguin Guide to Jazz Recordings commented: "something rarefied and remote in these relatively short improvisations."

A reviewer for The Free Jazz Collective called the album "a glorious pan-tonal spray of notes, covering the entire range of their instruments."

== Track listing ==
All compositions by Parker/Gräwe

1. "Unity Variations 1" – 24:33
2. "Unity Variations 2" – 15:42
3. "Unity Variations 3" – 10:37
4. "Unity Variations 4" – 3:54

== Personnel ==
- Evan Parker – soprano sax, tenor sax
- Georg Gräwe – piano
