= Jeffrey Morgan (musician) =

American jazz musician and composer (born 1954)

- Born: March 20, 1954 (age 71); Spokane, Washington
- Genres: Jazz
- Occupation: Musician
- Instrument(s): Soprano saxophone, tenor saxophone, alto saxophone, piano, violin, trumpet
- Years active: 1977 - present
- Labels: Konnex, Matchless, Creative Sources
- Website: jeffreymorgan.net

Jeffrey Morgan (born March 20, 1954) is an American jazz musician and composer. He has been active in the fields of free jazz and improvised music since 1977. He currently resides in Cologne, Germany.

== Education ==
Morgan started studying the Performing Arts: Music; Dance; Experimental Theater; Ethnomusicology; Philosophy of Aesthetics; and Eastern Religion and Native American culture at The Evergreen State College in Olympia, Washington, and graduated in 1977 with a Bachelor of Arts degree. During his education he attended the legendary Creative Music Studio in Woodstock, NY, and studied under Karl Berger, Don Cherry, and Oliver Lake as part of his external studies program. Moreover, in 1976 he created his first compositional work for music and dance – Distress Mistress, and performed his first ensemble work, The Delirium Dimension.

== Career ==
In 1977 he created his first multi-media interdisciplinary work – Galactic Visions, a composition for music, dance, slide projectors, costumes, and light design. Over the next several years he conceptualized and composed a few collaborative interdisciplinary works, such as It's Only Money, C.A.S.H, Transient Landscapes; and Mykrocozm, wherein he also had directing and acting responsibilities. In 1982 Morgan co-founded Presto Chango, a musical theater/performance group that incorporated costumes and stage design along with Andrew Woodruff and Bob Heywood. Two years later together, along with Paul Hoskin, he co-founded the New Art Orchestra in Seattle, Washington. He also worked for Muzak as supervisor to re-evaluate their library of music.

In 1987, Morgan moved to Birmingham, Alabama and worked with dancers Mary Horn and Susan Hefner; he also started an ongoing collaboration with LaDonna Smith. In 1988, he made his first tour in Europe with the Seattle-based trio Clank together with Johnny Calcagno and Charly Rowen, as well as working with several international musicians from Denmark, England, Germany, and Czechoslovakia. Since 1991, he has resided in Cologne, Germany, remaining active in the field of jazz and improvised music. He has also engaged in collaborations with Alan Silva, Keith Rowe, Peter Kowald, Paul Lytton and Xu Feng Xia just to name a few.

From 1991 to 1996 he organized the Drang in Klang festival for experimental and improvised music, and in 1994 he established another open-door workshop for Conceptual Composition and Improvisation in Cologne, which led to invitations to lead other workshops in Bielefeld, Hamburg, Lisbon, Leeds and Wuppertal. Also, in 1994 he composed another interdisciplinary work entitled In the Shadow of the Gambler which was performed in Cologne and Krefeld.

In addition, he has led three classes through a group process focused on Installation and Performance: "Elements" (1996); "Haunted House" (1998); and "N-Station" (1999) respectively, at the Tekniske Skole in Copenhagen. In 2012 he led a workshop for Sound Communication at the Academy of Media Arts in Cologne, Germany.

== Discography ==
=== Albums ===
==== Solo albums ====
- Quasar-Mach (1983)
- Quartz & Crow Feather (2000)
- Ritual Space Solo Piano Works (2005)

==== Collaborations ====
- Snake Eyes (1995) – with Joker Nies
- Near Vhana (1997) – with Joker Nies
- Electroshock – I Woke Up Braindead (1999)
- Dial: Log-Rhythm (1999) – with Keith Rowe
- Sign of the Raven (2000) – with Peter Jacquemyn and Mark Sanders
- Magnetic Fields (2002) – with Bert Wilson
- Dubbel Duo (2002) – with André Goudbeek, Peter Jacquemyn and Peter Kowald
- Take No Prisoners (2003) – with Bert Wilson
- Avenue X (2003) – with Capote
- Terra Incognita (2004) – with Paul Lytton
- Room 2 Room (2009) - with Lawrence Casserley
- White Smoke (2012) - with Mike Goyvearts and Willy Von Buggenhout
