= The Bishop's Move (album) =

Live album by Evan Parker Trio and Peter Brötzmann Trio
- Released: 2004
- Recorded: May 19, 2003
- Venue: 20 Festival International de Musique Actuelle de Victoriaville, Quebec, Canada
- Genre: Free jazz
- Length: 1:13:30
- Label: Les Disques Victo; CD 093
- Producer: Mario Gauthier

The Bishop's Move is a live album that combines two trios, one led by saxophonist Evan Parker, and the other led by saxophonist Peter Brötzmann. It was recorded on May 19, 2003, at the Festival International de Musique Actuelle de Victoriaville in Quebec, Canada, and was released in 2004 by Les Disques Victo. Parker is accompanied by pianist Alexander von Schlippenbach and drummer Paul Lytton, while Brötzmann is joined by bassist William Parker and drummer Hamid Drake.

== Reception ==
Professional ratings
Review scores
Source	Rating
AllMusic	4/5 stars
The Penguin Guide to Jazz	4/4 stars
Tom Hull – on the Web	A−

In a review for AllMusic, François Couture described the album as "a magical 75 minutes of relentless improvising, with a constant shift between open-ended sharing and thrust-and-parry dynamics." He wrote: "Most supergroups don't live up to expectations, but this one delivers all the promises contained within its name."

The authors of The Penguin Guide to Jazz Recordings called the album "a titanic encounter," and stated: "Parker's group and Brötzmann's seem to face off cross the Victoriaville stage and argue like dissenters at some ancient debate. Except the language is entirely of now and constantly evolving."

Andrey Henkin of All About Jazz commented: "the results are stirring... That it all comes off successfully without, one imagines, much planning or discussion, is proof that even in the spontaneous world of improvisation, experience and relationships count for more than something."

Writing for JazzTimes, Chris Kelsey remarked: "Each saxophonist seems to move somewhat in the direction of his opposite: Parker adds a little Ayler-ish madness to his hyperarticulate style, and Brotzmann's lines are more well-defined than they can be in other circumstances. The percussionists work great together, and von Schlippenbach is superb. William Parker shines as well. The performance is nicely varied, exciting and thoughtful-an excellent record all the way around."

== Track listing ==
1. "The Bishop's Move" – 73:30

== Personnel ==
- Evan Parker – tenor saxophone, soprano saxophone
- Alexander von Schlippenbach – piano
- Paul Lytton – drums, percussion
- Peter Brötzmann – tenor saxophone, tarogato, alto clarinet
- William Parker – bass
- Hamid Drake – drums, djembe, percussion
