= Natives and Aliens =

Studio album by Evan Parker, Barry Guy, Paul Lytton, and Marilyn Crispell
- Released: 1997
- Recorded: May 24, 1996
- Studio: Gateway Studios, London
- Genre: Free jazz
- Label: Leo Records; CD LR 243
- Producer: Evan Parker, Leo Feigin

Natives and Aliens is an album by the members of the Evan Parker Trio (saxophonist Evan Parker, bassist Barry Guy, and drummer Paul Lytton), with guest pianist Marilyn Crispell. It was recorded on May 24, 1996, at Gateway Studios in London, and was released in 1997 by Leo Records.

== Reception ==
Professional ratings
Review scores
Source	Rating
AllMusic	4/5 stars
The Penguin Guide to Jazz	3.5/4 stars
The Encyclopedia of Popular Music	4/5 stars

In a review for AllMusic, Stewart Mason wrote: "these 11 tracks are fluid, small-group improvisations that slot Crispell neatly into the practiced interplay of Parker's trio... The Evan Parker Trio, as always, play with the intuition and improvisatory grace that comes when skilled musicians are in tune with each other's idiosyncracies, giving Natives and Aliens a light -- almost swinging, in the old-school sense -- touch that's often missing in this brand of modern jazz."

The authors of the Penguin Guide to Jazz Recordings awarded the album 3½ stars, and stated: "it's interesting to hear Parker, so long devoted to the microtonal devastation of Western harmony, woking in the context of an instrument with fixed pitches." They wrote that Crispell creates "huge, resonant chords which are difficult to analyse with any precision but into which the entire trio seems to be subsumed."

== Track listing ==
1. "Stag's Horn" – 9:52
2. "Sumach" – 6:33
3. "Rhus" – 8:05
4. "Friends from Above" – 6:35
5. "Hirta" – 4:23
6. "Sippenaeken Visitation" – 8:22
7. "And the Tints" – 3:54
8. "A Deeper Red" – 1:46
9. "In Velvet" – 2:37
10. "Day of Small Truths" – 7:18
11. "Natives and Aliens" – 10:23

== Personnel ==
- Evan Parker – soprano saxophone, tenor saxophone
- Barry Guy – double bass, piccolo bass
- Paul Lytton – percussion
- Marilyn Crispell – piano
