= Sam Pluta =

American composer of electronic music (born 1979)

- Born: Samuel Francis Pluta; 1979 (age 46–47)
- Occupation: Composer
- Spouse: Sky Macklay
- Website: https://www.sampluta.com/

Sam Pluta is an American composer, sound artist, and performer of electronic music. He currently teaches in the Computer Music department at the Peabody Institute.

== Early life and education ==
After graduating from high school in Portsmouth, New Hampshire, Pluta completed his undergraduate studies at Santa Clara University. He went on to earn Master's degrees from the University of Birmingham and the University of Texas at Austin. In 2012, Pluta received his Doctor of Musical Arts from Columbia University, with a dissertation titled "Laptop Improvisation in a Multi-Dimensional Space". Pluta studied under Brad Garton, George Lewis, Russell Pinkston, Tristan Murail, Fabien Levy, Scott Wilson, Jonty Harrison, Kevin Puts, and Lynn Shurtleff.

== Professional career ==
=== Teaching ===
Pluta currently serves as associate professor of Computer Music and chair of Music, Technology, and Media at the Peabody Institute. Previously, Pluta taught composition and computer music at the University of Chicago, Bennington College, Manhattan School of Music, and The Walden School.

=== Composition and performance ===
Pluta is a composer, electronics performer, and technical director for Wet Ink Ensemble. He performs alongside Erin Lesser (flutes), Alex Mincek (saxophone), Ian Antoni (percussion), Eric Wubbels (piano), Josh Modney (violin), Mariel Roberts (cello), and Kate Soper (voice).

Pluta has also composed music for the New York Philharmonic, International Contemporary Ensemble, Yarn/Wire, Spektral Quartet, and other groups.
