= Vortex Jazz Club =

Music venue in north London, England

Coordinates: 51.549°N 0.076°W

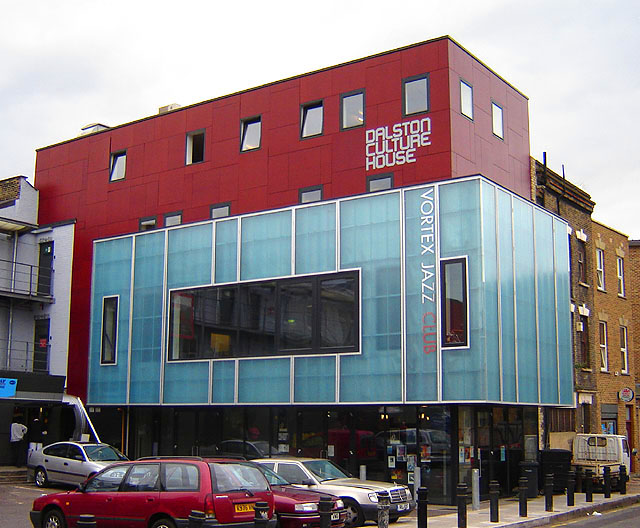
The Dalston Culture House with the Vortex Jazz Club (October 2005)

The Vortex Jazz Club is a music venue in London. It was founded by David Mossman in 1988.

== Background ==
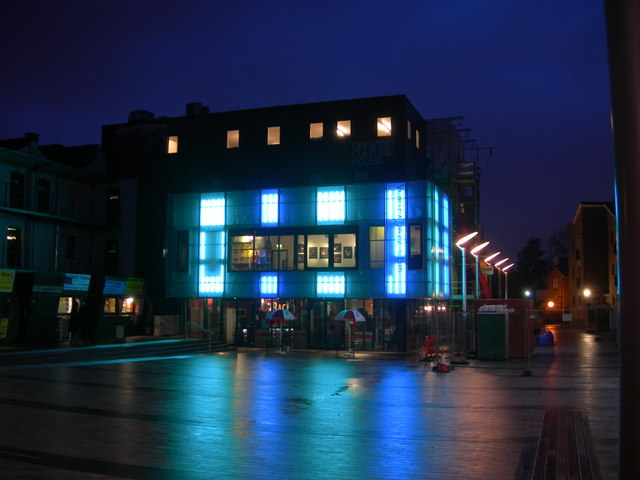
Vortex Jazz Club

The Vortex started as a jazz club in 1988 and was located in Stoke Newington Church Street, north London. But after the acquisition of that building by property developers, the club was moved in 2005 to the Dalston Culture House in Gillett Street, N16, in Gillett Square. The Square opened on 10 November 2006 with a performance by Andy Sheppard's Saxophone Massive, a band of 200 saxophonists. The street in front of the club was renamed "Aim Bailey Place" in December 2007 in honour of guitarist Derek Bailey.

Musicians who have played at the Vortex include Bailey, Django Bates, Tim Berne, Liane Carroll, John Etheridge, F-IRE Collective, Last Amendment, Evan Parker, Ian Shaw, and Kenny Wheeler. The first album on the club's record label was by the Portico Quartet. The club also hosts a Vocals@Vortex Open Mic Session run by Romy Summers and the house band, The Bob Stuckey Trio. It also has a monthly Gypsy/Eastern European night, hosted by Gina Boreham, which began in 2006 with Dunajska Kapelye's debut concert. The Vortex Club was founded by ex-taxi driver David Mossman. Mossman later started the Margate Jazz Festival, before he died in 2018.

In 2007, the club set up a record label, Vortex Records, to release the debut album by London-based trio Portico Quartet. Their album Knee-Deep in the North Sea was nominated for the 2008 Mercury Music Prize.

== Awards and honours ==
The club was nominated for venue of the year by the Parliamentary Jazz Appreciation Group in 2006 and 2007 and was winner of the Live Jazz Award in 2013.

Since 26 March 2012, the club has been listed in Time Out magazine's readers' poll as one of London's best music venues and received a nomination for Live Promotion Team of the Year in Music Week's awards in 2011.

== See also ==
- List of jazz clubs
