= Psi Records =

English record label

- Founded: 2001
- Founder: Evan Parker
- Distributor(s): Emanem Records
- Genre: Free improvisation, jazz
- Country of origin: England
- Location: London
- Official website: evanparker.com/psi.php

Psi Records is an independent record label that was founded by saxophonist Evan Parker, and that focuses on free improvisation.

== History ==
Parker founded Psi in 2001 with the assistance of Martin Davidson of Emanem Records. Parker had previously co-founded Incus Records in 1970, but left the label in 1986, after which he recorded for Leo, FMP, Emanem, and ECM. According to Parker, he started the label because he "missed the feeling of overseeing a project from start to finish," and chose the name Psi "for all the associations with irrational numbers, golden ratios etc. but above all for the Psi phenomena which I am convinced are at the heart of improvised music making."

From 2001 to 2012, Psi released nearly 90 CDs, after which Parker "decided that it's time to pause and think again."

== Practices ==
Parker stated that the goal of the label was "to represent my own music in the way I like to see it done and to draw people's attention to the work of other musicians who I feel are not given the prominence they deserve." According to writer Richard Williams, Psi "developed its own identity, visual and tactile as well as musical," with releases that featured a "unified (rather than uniform) design." Critic Stuart Broomer described the label as having "the feeling of an expanded musical family," given the fact that many of the musicians had played with Parker prior to recording with Psi.

== Releases ==
Catalog #	Release year	Recording year	Album name	Personnel
psi 01.01	2001	2001	Lines Burnt in Light	Evan Parker
psi 02.01	2002	1998	'Smatter	Gerd Dudek
psi 02.02	2002	2000	The Grass is Greener	Han Bennink and Evan Parker
psi 02.03	2002	1980	Six of One	Evan Parker
psi 02.04	2002	1980	From Saxophone & Trombone	Evan Parker and George Lewis
psi 02.05	2002	1972	Collective Calls (Urban) (Two Microphones)	Evan Parker and Paul Lytton
psi 02.06	2002	1997	At Les Instants Chavirés	Evan Parker, Barry Guy, and Paul Lytton
psi 03.01	2003	1975	At the Unity Theatre	Evan Parker and Paul Lytton
psi 03.02–3	2003	2002	Free Zone Appleby 2002 (2 CDs)	Various Artists
psi 03.04	2003	1995–2003	Dream Sequence	Kenny Wheeler
psi 03.05	2003	2002	Broomriding	Alexander von Schlippenbach
psi 03.06	2003	1986	The Snake Decides	Evan Parker
psi 04.01	2004	1973	Song for Someone	Kenny Wheeler
psi 04.02	2004	2003	Suspensions and Anticipations	Stan Tracey and Evan Parker
psi 04.03–4	2004	1980	Pisa 1980 Improvisors Symposium (2 CDs)	Various Artists
psi 04.05	2004	2003	Free Zone Appleby 2003	Various Artists
psi 04.06–7	2004	2003	America 2003 (2 CDs)	Evan Parker, Alexander von Schlippenbach, and Paul Lytton
psi 04.08	2004	2004	Or Air	Joel Ryan
psi 04.09	2004	2002/4	Dead or Alive	FURT
psi 04.10	2004	2004	Gubbröra	Sten Sandell and David Stackenäs with Evan Parker, Barry Guy, and Paul Lytton
psi 05.01	2005	1975	The London Concert	Derek Bailey and Evan Parker
psi 05.02	2005	2004	Iskra³	Paul Rutherford
psi 05.03	2005	2003	LDP - Cologne	Urs Leimgruber, Jacques Demierre, and Barre Phillips
psi 05.04	2005	2004	Crevulations	Stan Tracey and Evan Parker
psi 05.05	2005	2004	Free Zone Appleby 2004	Various Artists
psi 05.06	2005	2004	Critical Mass	Agustí Fernández and Mats Gustafsson
psi 05.07	2005	2004	Naan Tso	Foxes Fox (Evan Parker, Steve Beresford, John Edwards, and Louis Moholo)
psi 06.01	2006	2005	Solo	Rudi Mahall
psi 06.02	2006	2005	Crossing the River	Evan Parker Octet
psi 06.03	2006	1997	Tarantella	Aki Takase Piano Quintet
psi 06.04	2006	2006	Cut and Continuum	Adam Linson
psi 06.05	2006	1970	The Topography of the Lungs	Evan Parker
psi 06.06	2006	2005	Free Zone Appleby 2005	Various Artists
psi 06.07	2006	1977	Biosystem	Spontaneous Music Ensemble
psi 06.08	2006	2005	More is More	Peter Evans
psi 06.09	2006	2004/6	Omnivm	FURT
psi 06.10	2006	2004/5	Winterreise	Alexander von Schlippenbach Trio
psi 07.01	2007	2006	Music from ColourDome	Lawrence Casserley and Simon Desorgher
psi 07.02	2007	2005	La Lumière de Pierres	François Houle, Evan Parker, and Benoît Delbecq
psi 07.03	2007	2004	Contraption	Bark!
psi 07.04	2007	2006	Free Zone Appleby 2006	Various Artists
psi 07.05–6	2007	2005	spin networks (2 CDs)	fORCH
psi 07.07	2007	1983	Hook, Drift & Shuffle	Evan Parker
psi 08.01	2008	1989	Conic Sections	Evan Parker
psi 08.02	2008	2005	FURT plus "equals"	FURT
psi 08.03	2008	2007	Journey	Fred Van Hove
psi 08.04	2008	2007	Free Zone Appleby 2007	Various Artists
psi 08.05	2008	2007	Xylobiont	John Eckhardt
psi 08.06	2008	2003/7	Improvisations for George Riste	London Improvisers Orchestra
psi 08.07	2008	2008	Friulian Sketches	Alexander von Schlippenbach
psi 08.08	2008	2004	Rue Victor Massé	Ray Warleigh
psi 08.09	2008	2008	Volume	John Edwards
psi 09.01	2009	1975	Saxophone Solos	Evan Parker
psi 09.02	2009	2007	Beam Stone	Per Anders Nilsson, Sten Sandell, and Raymond Strid
psi 09.03	2009	2007	Integument	Lawrence Casserley and Adam Linson
psi 09.04	2009	2007	Un llamp que no s'acaba mai	Agustí Fernández
psi 09.05–6	2009	2008	Nature/Culture (2 CDs)	Peter Evans
psi 09.07	2009	2006–8	Essex Foam Party	Grutronic
psi 09.08	2009	2008/9	Sense	FURT
psi 09.09	2009	2003	SET	Evan Parker
psi 09.10	2009	2007/8	Adrift	Richard Barrett
psi 10.01	2010	2008	Whitstable Solo	Evan Parker
psi 10.02	2010	2009	Creak Above 33	Nate Wooley and Paul Lytton
psi 10.03	2010	2008	A week went by	Aki Takase
psi 10.04	2010	2009	Wazifa	Pat Thomas, Raymond Strid, and Clayton Thomas
psi 10.05	2010	2009	Psalms	Evan Parker and Sten Sandell
psi 10.06	2010	2009	Hyste	John Russell
psi 10.07	2010	2009	Stops	Tony Marsh
psi 10.08	2010	2009	Cry, Want	Hans Koller with Bill Frisell
psi 11.01	2011	2009/10	Vents	Agustí Fernández and Joan Saura
psi 11.02	2011	2011	EP	DJ Sniff
psi 11.03	2011	2008–11	Trance Map	Evan Parker and Matthew Wright
psi 11.04	2011	2010	Lio Leo Leon	London Improvisers Orchestra
psi 11.05	2011	2008	Figures and Grounds	Adam Linson Systems Quartet
psi 11.06	2011	2010	Quartet Improvisations	Tony Marsh
psi 11.07	2011	2006	It won't be called broken chair	Misha Mengelberg and Evan Parker
psi 11.08	2011	2009	Squall Line	Aleks Kolkowski and Ute Wassermann
psi 11.09	2011	2009	Together in Zero Space	Grutronic and Evan Parker
psi 11.10	2011	2010	The Bleeding Edge	Evan Parker, Okkyung Lee, and Peter Evans
psi 12.01	2012	2006	Live at the Vortex	Foxes Fox
psi 12.02	2012	2011	Courants des Vents	Toma Gouband
psi 12.03	2012	2010	Hasselt	Evan Parker Electroacoustic Ensemble
psi 12.04	2012	2009	Fume of Sighs	Bark!
psi 12.05	2012	2012	Day and Night	Gerd Dudek
psi 15.01	2015	1978	Monoceros	Evan Parker
psi 16.01	2016	2012	as the wind	Evan Parker
