= Six of One (Evan Parker album) =

Live album by Evan Parker
- Released: 1982
- Recorded: June 18, 1980
- Venue: St Jude-on-the-Hill, London
- Genre: Free improvisation
- Length: 56:16
- Label: Incus; 39

Evan Parker chronology
Incision (1981)	Six of One (1982)	Tracks (1983)

Six of One is a live solo soprano saxophone album by Evan Parker. It was recorded on June 18, 1980, at St Jude-on-the-Hill in London, and was initially released on vinyl in 1982 by Incus Records. In 2002, it was reissued on CD by Parker's Psi label with an additional track from the same session, and in 2021, it was reissued on vinyl in remastered form but with the original six track format by Cafe Oto's Otoroku label.

== Reception ==
Professional ratings
Review scores
Source	Rating
AllMusic	4.5/5 stars
The Penguin Guide to Jazz	3/4 stars

In a review for AllMusic, Rick Anderson stated that the album "finds Parker exploring the sonic limits of his soprano saxophone in ways that evoke both the more adventurous jazz-based work of Anthony Braxton and future recordings by downtown legend John Zorn. His mastery of circular breathing techniques means that these pieces... proceed without interruption from beginning to end... Every track on this album is worth hearing, and some of them are quite startlingly lovely."

The authors of The Penguin Guide to Jazz Recordings described the music as "intense, highly focused and extremely demanding," and wrote: "Parker has the ability to suspend normal time, musical or chronological, while he is playing, so that the impression is of densely packed musical singularities that unravel in what is no longer strictly 'real' time."

The BBC's John Eyles noted that the individual tracks "have a consistency of sound and approach, sounding like different facets of one larger whole, and so hang together almost like a suite," and commented: "Parker's solo soprano work has continued to develop and evolve over time, acquiring even greater variety, confidence and sheer stamina. To compare this album with Lines Burnt in Light is illuminating. This early album is like one of the sketchbooks for that later masterpiece. Both are essential listening and each enhances understanding of the other."

Bruce Lee Gallanter of the Downtown Music Gallery remarked: "Five years on from Saxophone Solos and with circular breathing and polyphonics well-worn into his live performances, Parker's experiments here produce sustained passages of brilliant flight. Set into the echoes and resonances of a St Judes On The Hill church, the results are stunning."

== Track listing ==
1. "One of Six" – 4:35
2. "Two of Six" – 11:35
3. "Three of Six" – 10:00
4. "Four of Six" – 11:49
5. "Five of Six" – 6:53
6. "Six of One" – 6:00
7. "Sixes and Sevens" – 6:53 (bonus track on CD reissue)

== Personnel ==
- Evan Parker – soprano saxophone
