= The Snake Decides =

Studio album by Evan Parker
- Released: May 1988
- Recorded: 30 January 1986
- Studio: St Paul's Church, Oxford, England
- Genre: Free improvisation
- Label: Incus, Psi Records, Otoroku
- Producer: Michael Gerzon

Evan Parker chronology
Atlanta (1986)	The Snake Decides (1988)	Conic Sections (1989)

The Snake Decides is a studio album by British jazz saxophonist Evan Parker. It was released in 1988 on Parker and Derek Bailey's Incus Records label, re-released on Parker's Psi label in 2003, and reissued again in remastered form with new liner notes by Brian Morton on the Otoroku label in 2018.

The album features four unaccompanied soprano saxophone solos, recorded by sound engineer Michael Gerzon in St Paul's Church, Oxford, England in 1986. The wood cut reproduced on the cover is by George Murphy, and is also titled "The Snake Decides."

== Reception ==
Professional ratings
Review scores
Source	Rating
Allmusic	4/5 stars
Penguin Guide to Jazz	👑
All About Jazz	5/5 stars

The authors of The Penguin Guide to Jazz awarded the album one of its rare crown accolades, in addition to featuring it as part of the Core Collection, calling it "a great record," "an essential document of modern music," and "a hyper-subtle document of one of Parker's keynote performances, in which he takes the language experiments of the previous two decades and compresses them into one flowing and involving performance." They also praised Gerzon's engineering skills, calling him "possibly the only man in Britain whose ears were more finely tuned to the highest harmonic levels than Parker's own," and stating that the album "can create the impression that you are actually inside Parker's instrument."

François Couture, writing for AllMusic, commented: "One pictures a mad snake charmer, playing multiple melodies at once to make the snakes stretch into different directions and move in interlocking patterns. In 'Buriden's Ass' and 'Haine's Last Tape,' the number of notes per minute hits a peak. But Parker's music has never been about keeping score. The flurry is necessary to mesmerize the listener, to hypnotize him, to make everything else within earshot fade away. All that remains is this kaleidoscope of multiphonics."

In a review for All About Jazz, John Eyles stated that the album "provides a ready-made excuse to focus on the serpentine qualities of Parker's soprano playing. His relentlessly energetic flurries of notes defy logic or reason, seeming to spiral and to tie themselves in knots and coils... Highly recommended."

Writing for The Guardian, Stewart Lee included The Snake Decides on his list of "Top Five Evan Parker Albums", calling it "A gripping solo set, brilliantly recorded."

Matt Micucci of JazzIz included the album in his list of "Five Essential albums of 1986", calling it "arguably the most celebrated of [Parker's] solo saxophone records", and stating that it "gives Parker an opportunity to focus on the serpentine qualities of his playing."

== Track listing ==
All compositions by Evan Parker

1. "The Snake Decides" – 19:56
2. "Leipzig Folly" – 11:42
3. "Buriden's Ass" – 6:29
4. "Haine's Last Tape" – 6:01

== Personnel ==
- Evan Parker – soprano saxophone
