= From Saxophone & Trombone =

Live album by Evan Parker and George Lewis
- Released: 1980
- Recorded: May 18, 1980
- Venues: Art Workers' Guild, London
- Genre: Free improvisation
- Length: 43:09
- Labels: Incus; 35
- Producer: Dave Holland

Evan Parker chronology
4,4,4, (1980)	From Saxophone & Trombone (1980)	At the Finger Palace (1980)

George Lewis chronology
Homage to Charles Parker (1979)	From Saxophone & Trombone (1980)	Chicago Slow Dance (1981)

From Saxophone & Trombone is a live album by saxophonist Evan Parker and trombonist George Lewis. It was recorded on May 18, 1980, at the Art Workers' Guild in London, and was initially released on vinyl later that year by Incus Records. In 2002, it was reissued on CD by Parker's Psi label, and in 2023, it was reissued on vinyl in remastered form by Cafe Oto's Otoroku label.

== Reception ==
Professional ratings
Review scores
Source	Rating
AllMusic	4/5 stars
The Penguin Guide to Jazz	4/4 stars
The Virgin Encyclopedia of Jazz	4/5 stars

In a review for AllMusic, Dan Warburton called the album a "stunning collection," and noted Lewis's "rambunctious virtuosity and good-humored mastery of the trombone" as well as Parker's "legendary circular breathing."

The authors of The Penguin Guide to Jazz Recordings awarded the album a full four stars, describing it as "one of Parker's best recorded statements and one of the best documents of Lewis's radical deconstruction of the trombone." They singled out the opening track for praise, calling it "exquisite."

Glenn Astarita of All About Jazz wrote: "No frills or hidden agendas to be found throughout these five improvisation based works. You name it—they cover it! The duo explores various harmonic twists and turns amid microtonal sounds and ethereal soundscapes. They dig deep from within while also displaying the utmost improvisational acumen, as most of us would come to expect... It's all about artistry in motion and the duo's acute cognizance of dynamics and temperance. (Recommended.)"

The Downtown Music Gallery's Bruce Lee Gallanter stated: "the recording captures all the fine filigree detail so celebrated on Parker's later Six of One, though here the listener is treated to tenor as well as soprano, plus, of course, George Lewis' trombone... It's a recording of two young masters, documented beautifully."

== Track listing ==
1. "From Saxophone & Trombone 1" – 11:00
2. "From Saxophone & Trombone 2" – 2:03
3. "From Saxophone & Trombone 3" – 9:49
4. "From Saxophone & Trombone 4" – 5:00
5. "From Saxophone & Trombone 5" – 11:53

== Personnel ==
- Evan Parker – soprano saxophone, tenor saxophone
- George Lewis – trombone
