= Day and Night (Gerd Dudek album) =

Studio album by Gerd Dudek
- Released: 2012
- Recorded: January 30, 2012
- Studios: Curtis Schwartz Studio, Ardingly, West Sussex, England
- Genre: Jazz
- Labels: Psi; 12.05
- Producers: Evan Parker, Martin Davidson

Gerd Dudek chronology
'Smatter (2002)	Day and Night (2012)	With You (2023)

Day and Night is an album by saxophonist Gerd Dudek. It was recorded on January 30, 2012, at Curtis Schwartz Studio in Ardingly, West Sussex, England, and was released later that year by Psi Records. On the album, Dudek is joined by pianist Hans Koller, double bassist Oli Hayhurst, and drummer Gene Calderazzo.

== Reception ==
Professional ratings
Review scores
Source	Rating
All About Jazz	5/5 stars
Jazzwise	3/5 stars

In a 5-star review for All About Jazz, John Eyles wrote: "That material is perfectly chosen to showcase Dudek at his best. All the pieces have strong melody lines that are played beautifully... Everything about Dudek's playing is enviably flawless... Every track here is so good that it is impossible to single out any one as the best, but altogether Day and Night is one of the very best albums of 2012."

Stephen Graham of Jazzwise remarked: "Although clearly not cutting edge music as we understand it today, Day and Night is all about fine craftsmanship and the power of instinctive interpretation. There's no attempt to be clever-clever, which is one of the reasons why the album is so smart and likeable."

Writer Richard Williams stated that Dudek's playing "has the vigour — physical and intellectual — that you might associate with a musician half his age, although I think his exceptionally handsome tone has softened slightly over the years," and commented: "the repertoire is... well chosen... The quartet had played at the Vortex the night before going into the studio, and the session has a lovely combination of freshness, relaxation, and intense concentration."

Point of Departure's John Litweiler noted that although Dudek's "inspiration is Coltrane's early Atlantics... he plays a minimum of scales and double-time... his accents are dispersed, he swings freely over the rhythms instead of hitting downbeats Coltrane-style." He wrote: "Dudek captures some of Ornette Coleman's thematic-improvisation spirit in the way he spins broken lines from 'Congeniality' motives. Herbie Nichols' 'Step Tempest' is even more provocative, lyrical playing in a harmonic terrain at a tangent to the original changes."

Writing for JazzWord, Ken Waxman stated: "the masterful readings of these tunes depends as much on the veteran's interpretations as the enthusiasm of the younger players... Steve Lacy once observed that 'Free Jazz keeps you young'. And it appears Dudek is one more proof of that aphorism."

== Track listing ==
1. "Step Tempest" (Herbie Nichols) – 4:50
2. "Congeniality" (Ornette Coleman) – 8:20
3. "Blues a la Carte" (Wayne Shorter) – 6:53
4. "Duke Ellington's Sound of Love" (Charles Mingus) – 10:01
5. "Blues to You" (John Coltrane) – 5:36
6. "We Salute the Night" (Kenny Wheeler) – 7:32
7. "Fedora" (Kenny Wheeler) – 7:20
8. "Der Tag Mit Seinem Lichte" (Johann Sebastian Bach) – 5:49

== Personnel ==
- Gerd Dudek – tenor saxophone, soprano saxophone
- Hans Koller – piano
- Oli Hayhurst – double bass
- Gene Calderazzo – drums
