= The Ayes Have It =

Live album by Evan Parker
- Released: 2001
- Recorded: December 1983; August 1991
- Venue: Angel and Crown, London
- Genre: Free jazz
- Length: 1:08:39
- Label: Emanem; 4055

Evan Parker chronology
September Duos (2001)	The Ayes Have It (2001)	Lines Burnt in Light (2001)

The Ayes Have It is an album by saxophonist Evan Parker. Tracks 1–4 were recorded in a London studio during December 1983, and feature Parker with bassist Paul Rogers, and, in a rare recorded appearance, percussionist Jamie Muir. The remaining track was recorded live at the Angel and Crown pub in London on August 1, 1991, and features Parker, Rogers, trombonist Wolter Wierbos, and percussionist Mark Sanders. The album was released by Emanem Records in 2001.

== Reception ==
Professional ratings
Review scores
Source	Rating
AllMusic	4/5 stars
The Penguin Guide to Jazz	3/4 stars
Tom Hull – on the Web	A−

In a review for AllMusic, Steve Loewy wrote: "Parker is in his usually good form at both sessions... While the two sessions have ostensibly little in common... each easily stands on its own as an excellent example of the free improvisational spirit of the period."

The authors of The Penguin Guide to Jazz praised the live track, calling the quartet "an astonishingly good group," and commenting: "we are increasingly persuaded that this is the line-up and these the recordings which clinched the format."

A reviewer for All About Jazz noted "Parker's ability to shoehorn his creativity into whatever niche is available," and stated: "The Eyes Have It is essential listening for any Evan Parker fan, and a fine starting point for aficionado of free improvisation."

== Track listing ==
1. "Aye 1" – 9:16
2. "Aye 2" – 4:02
3. "Aye 3" – 8:54
4. "Aye 4" – 9:29
5. "The Eyes Have It" – 36:30

== Personnel ==
- Evan Parker – tenor saxophone, soprano saxophone
- Paul Rogers – bass
- Jamie Muir – percussion, toys (tracks 1–4)
- Wolter Wierbos – trombone (track 5)
- Mark Sanders – percussion (track 5)
