= The Music Improvisation Company 1968–1971 =

Studio album by the Music Improvisation Company
- Released: 1976
- Recorded: 4 July 1969 and 18 June 1970; London
- Genre: Free jazz
- Length: 46:04
- Labels: Incus; 17

The Music Improvisation Company chronology
The Music Improvisation Company (1970)	The Music Improvisation Company 1968–1971 (1976)

Evan Parker chronology
The Topography of the Lungs (1970)	The Music Improvisation Company 1968–1971 (1976)	The Music Improvisation Company (1970)

Derek Bailey chronology
The Topography of the Lungs (1970)	The Music Improvisation Company 1968–1971 (1976)	The Music Improvisation Company (1970)

The Music Improvisation Company 1968–1971 is an album by The Music Improvisation Company recorded over 1968 and 1970 and released on the Incus label in 1976. The quartet features saxophonist Evan Parker, guitarist Derek Bailey, Hugh Davies on various self-made electronic instruments, and percussionist Jamie Muir.

== Reception ==
Professional ratings
Review scores
Source	Rating
AllMusic	4/5 stars
The Penguin Guide to Jazz Recordings	3.5/4 stars

AllMusic's Thom Jurek stated "It is a necessary addition to anyone's library who is interested in improvised music."

The authors of the Penguin Guide to Jazz Recordings wrote: "The six pieces are in the main about a quartet thinking and speaking as freely with one another as they possibly could."

== Track listing ==
All compositions by Derek Bailey, Hugh Davies, Jamie Muir and Evan Parker.

1. "Pointing" – 7:19
2. "Untitled 3" – 6:32
3. "Untitled 4" – 4:09
4. "Bedrest" – 7:37
5. "Its Tongue Trapped to the Rock by a Limpet the Water Rat Succumbed to the Incoming Tide" – 9:01
6. "In the Victim's Absence" – 10:33

== Personnel ==
=== The Music Improvisation Company ===
- Derek Bailey – guitar
- Hugh Davies – electronics, organ
- Jamie Muir – percussion and cover art
- Evan Parker – soprano saxophone, amplified autoharp
