= Derek Bailey & Han Bennink =

Live album by Derek Bailey & Han Bennink
- Released: 1972
- Recorded: June 16 & 17, 1972
- Venue: Verity's Place, London
- Genre: Free jazz
- Label: Incus 9

Derek Bailey chronology
Solo Guitar (1970)	Derek Bailey & Han Bennink (1972)	Iskra 1903 (1972)

Derek Bailey & Han Bennink (subtitled Selections from Live Performances at Verity's Place) is a live album by guitarist Derek Bailey and percussionist Han Bennink which was recorded 1972 and released on the Incus label.

== Reception ==
Professional ratings
Review scores
Source	Rating
AllMusic	4.5/5 stars

The AllMusic review by Thom Jurek states "This selection of live duet performances from 1972 is a wonder to listen to three decades after the original performances. The guitar's greatest improviser bantering musically with the Netherlands' greatest drummer is, no doubt, a point of interest for those interested in the extremes of Western music".

Writing for Bells, Henry Kuntz commented: "Live At Verity's Place is the type of meeting that, due to the very stylistic differences it showcases, tends to push the music into unusual areas, stretching the musicians' abilities to the fullest. It's the type of meeting upon which the growth and expansion of improvised music depends."

== Track listing ==
All compositions by Derek Bailey and Han Bennink.

1. "Call That a Balance" - 2:07
2. "Misty" - 7:18
3. "The Title" - 2:17
4. "Who Is That" - 4:02
5. "The Girl with the Concrete Tongue" - 4:35
6. "Din Din Teo" - 9:31
7. "On a Clear Day" - 4:07
8. "Barb" - 1:36
9. "Shake Your Arse White Man" - 1:32
10. "Whiling" - 2:19
11. "When Day Is Done and Shadows Fall I Think of You" - 4:10

== Personnel ==
- Derek Bailey - guitar
- Han Bennink - percussion
