= Monoceros (album) =

Studio album by Evan Parker
- Released: 1978
- Recorded: 30 April 1978
- Genre: Free improvisation
- Label: Incus Records
- Producer: Numar Lubin

Evan Parker chronology
At the Unity Theatre (1975)	Monoceros (1978)	Ra 1+2 (1978)

Monoceros is an album of solo soprano saxophone improvisations by British jazz saxophonist Evan Parker. It was recorded directly to disk using the direct-cut technique, with assistance from Numar Lubin, Gerald Reynolds and Michael Reynolds of Nimbus Records. It was initially released on Parker and Derek Bailey's Incus Records label in 1978, and was reissued by Chronoscope (1999), Psi (2015), and Treader (2020).

In the album liner notes, Parker wrote: "The aim in placing the one stereo microphone used was to find a position in which the sound of the saxophone in that room was reproduced most convincingly. The ambience is the natural acoustic of the room. For two years I have been looking for a situation where this technique could be used."

== Reception ==
Professional ratings
Review scores
Source	Rating
AllMusic	4.5/5 stars

In a review for AllMusic, Henry M. Shteamer wrote that the album is "perhaps the next best thing to seeing him perform live," and commented: "When one listens to Evan Parker, one hears a note as well as all the residual tones around it; each breath ends up sounding like a battle between the different registers of the horn. At various times, Parker's saxophone sounds like dolphin speech, electronic tape squeals, or human murmurs; namely, anything but what it actually is. His language on the instrument is essential listening for anyone interested in acoustic experimental music."

A review for All About Jazz states: "On Monoceros, Parker explores a wide range of soprano saxophone work, though most of it is hardly recognizable as such: squeaking, squawking, and birdlike noises persist throughout... The guiding principle of this music, as realized by Parker, was to use technical prowess to remove the barriers between the sounds in his head and the sounds coming from his horn. Generations of saxophone players who followed in Parker's footsteps owe a huge debt to his innovations on the instrument. Indeed, none of Monoceros is easy listening: Parker seems driven to play as freely and outspokenly as possible."

Writing for The Quietus, Nick Roseblade remarked: "The opening track, 'Monoceros 1', is a twenty-two-minute hypnotic thing of beauty. The playing has a fierce intensity to it. The way Parker intertwines his saxophone is just mesmerising. It's as if the instrument has come alive and all Parker can do is hold on and remember to blow. However, there are times when Parker is very much in control and it feels like he is playing for all he's worth. His triple-tongued technique sounds as unconventional now, but in 1979 it must have sounded other worldly. In your mind you can almost see the veins sticking out on Parker's lips as he applies more pressure to the reed and just blows. His overtone control is also on full display throughout Monoceros. This technique was picked up from exposure to folk music in Africa and the Middle East. If this is all that Parker had recorded, Monoceros would still have been a seminal release. But it wasn't. There are another three songs on the album's second side. 'Monoceros 2, 3 and 4' are music shorter. The longest being nine minutes, but they possess the same levels of intensity and inventiveness that made 'Monoceros 1' such a joy."

Henry Kuntz, in a review for Bells, said: "played at a high volume, Monoceros is as close a duplication of the way the music sounds in performance as you might hope to hear."

== Track listing ==
1. "Monoceros 1" - 21:30
2. "Monoceros 2" - 5:12
3. "Monoceros 3" - 8:58
4. "Monoceros 4" - 4:03

== Personnel ==
- Evan Parker: soprano saxophone
