= The London Concert (Derek Bailey and Evan Parker album) =

Live album by Derek Bailey and Evan Parker
- Released: 1975
- Recorded: February 14, 1975
- Venue: Wigmore Hall, London
- Genre: Free improvisation
- Length: 1:08:31
- Label: Incus; 16

Derek Bailey chronology
Improvisation (1975)	The London Concert (1975)	Duo (1976)

Evan Parker chronology
At the Unity Theatre (1975)	The London Concert (1975)	Saxophone Solos (1976)

The London Concert is a live album by guitarist Derek Bailey and saxophonist Evan Parker. It was recorded on February 14, 1975, at Wigmore Hall in London, and was initially released on vinyl later that year by Incus Records. In 2005, it was reissued on CD by Parker's Psi label with additional tracks, and in 2018, it was reissued on vinyl in remastered form but with the original four track format by Cafe Oto's Otoroku label.

== Reception ==
Professional ratings
Review scores
Source	Rating
All About Jazz	4.5/5 stars
AllMusic	3/5 stars
The Encyclopedia of Popular Music	3/5 stars
The Penguin Guide to Jazz	3.5/4 stars

Regarding the Psi reissue, the authors of The Penguin Guide to Jazz Recordings wrote: "There are solo spots, but it is in the interplay between two of the five defining figures of British improvisation... that the real value of the set lies... this still seems fresh and inventive, for all its standing as a memorial to lost friendship."

John Eyles of All About Jazz stated: "close listening reveals [Bailey's] usual trademarks, not least his total avoidance of clichés, licks, or anything smacking of pre-preparation... Parker is instantly recognisable as the precursor to his modern day self... it is the chance to hear the two masters interacting and bouncing ideas off each other that makes this release historic." Another AAJ reviewer commented: "what is noticeable in this context is how each of the eight tracks seems to be moderate and unhurried... this duo performance is invested with the novelty and excitement of musical discovery, and it should attract anyone who desires a deeper insight into the musical currents of those times."

Reviewing the reissue for One Final Note, Michael Rosenstein remarked: "Listening to this it's hard to imagine how radical it must have sounded three decades ago. In the intervening years, Bailey's desiccated shards and Parker's serpentine lines and shattered multiphonics have virtually defined the vocabulary of countless musicians. And their spitfire spontaneous interactions have become as much a strategy for improvising as bop's harmonic refractions of standards. But listening to these two as they push at the edges of discovery still sends shivers of excitement."

In The Wire Primers, Philip Clark noted that "the performance touched on perfection," and wrote: "In the opening moments, Parker circumnavigates Bailey's sexily elastic microtonal lines before he can spot a convincing way in. As the improvisation evolves, Parker's chirping portamentos both fuse and ricochet against Bailey's microtonal webs to create a broken but holistic two-part counterpoint. The guitar abruptly stops and Parker transforms what were nanosecond sonic flecks into sustained honks. Time elongates. The structure buckles."

Paris Transatlantic's Dan Warburton stated: "The London Concert still stands as perhaps the most impressive collaboration between these two towering figures of European Improvised Music... it's all too easy to forget how utterly unprecedented and dangerous this music must have sounded when it burst forth 30 years ago into the hallowed auditorium of London's Wigmore Hall... The London Concert is quite simply indispensable."

Ken Waxman of JazzWord singled out "Part 3" for praise, commenting: "Spectacularly, shredded split tones and irregularly pitched vibrations... explode all over the aural space, causing Bailey to turn to harder plectrum interface, as node response swells into unique counter patterns. Soon you start to feel like a spectator at a particularly frenetic tennis game, with the ball constantly in motion, jumping, soaring and bouncing from one to another. Each man is concentrating on an individual strategy, but as polyphony emerges, so does the shape of the cooperative contest."

== Track listing ==
Original Incus LP release

1. "Part 1" – 14:50
2. "Part 2" – 3:58
3. "Part 3" – 11:52
4. "Part 4" – 6:57

Psi CD reissue

1. "First Half Solo" – 4:16
2. "Part 1" – 14:54
3. "Part 1A" – 5:50
4. "Part 2" – 3:51
5. "Part 2A" – 10:24
6. "Second Half Solos" – 10:26
7. "Part 3" – 11:52
8. "Part 4" – 6:56

== Personnel ==
- Derek Bailey – guitar
- Evan Parker – soprano saxophone, tenor saxophone
