= Aida (album) =

Live album by Derek Bailey
- Released: 1980
- Recorded: July 4 and August 3, 1980
- Venue: Théâtre Dunois, Paris; Institute of Contemporary Arts, London
- Genre: Free jazz
- Length: 40:38
- Label: Incus

Derek Bailey chronology
| Music and Dance (1980) | Aida (1980) | Dart Drug (1981) |

Aida is a live album of solo acoustic performances by guitarist Derek Bailey which was recorded in Paris and London in 1980 and released by Incus.

== Reception ==
Professional ratings
Review scores
| Source | Rating |
|---|---|
| Allmusic | 4.5/5 stars |

The Allmusic review by Brian Olewnick states "Aida is a remarkably beautiful entry to one of the world's masterful musicians. Indeed, he sounds like no one else".

== Track listing ==
All compositions by Derek Bailey.

1. "Paris" – 19:36
2. "Niigata Snow" – 6:55
3. "An Echo in Another's Mind" – 14:07

== Personnel ==
- Derek Bailey – acoustic guitar
