= Collective Calls (Urban) (Two Microphones) =

Studio album by Evan Parker and Paul Lytton
- Released: 1972
- Recorded: 15-16 April 1972
- Studio: Standard Essence Co, London
- Genre: Free improvisation
- Label: Incus; 5

Evan Parker chronology
The Music Improvisation Company (1970)	Collective Calls (Urban) (Two Microphones) (1972)	At the Unity Theatre (1975)

Collective Calls (Urban) (Two Microphones), subtitled "an improvised urban psychodrama in eight parts", is an album by saxophonist Evan Parker and drummer Paul Lytton. It was recorded in April 1972 at the Standard Essence Co, a small loft space in London, and was released later that year by Incus Records. The album was reissued on CD by Psi Records in 2002.

== Reception ==
Professional ratings
Review scores
Source	Rating
AllMusic	3/5 stars
The Penguin Guide to Jazz	3.5/4 stars

In a review for AllMusic, François Couture wrote that the album "was filled with amazing sounds that remain puzzling to this day... The pair explores the very quiet and very loud, unveiling new sounds and textures... the tracks... form a succession of sharp contrasts, with each side of the original LP ending with a short drone piece that leaves the listener clueless. Decades after the fact, Collective Calls still packs an artistic punch."

The authors of The Penguin Guide to Jazz awarded the album 3½ stars, and stated: "these are riveting performances, intensely concentrated and very faithfully captured... the whole has admirable coherence and consistency."

Writing for Bells, Henry Kuntz commented: "the main focus of much of the music is harmonic. Parker's work tends to be in long areas of sound, more defined by timbre than by pitch which, by utilizing rapid changes of embouchure, he is able to surround with several seemingly independent sound sources. There are obvious similarities to some types of electronic music... but while Parker's range is necessarily more limited than most electronic instruments, he is able to move about with greater ease and to impart to his work a greater urgency."

== Track listing ==
1. "Peradam" – 5:09
2. "Cat's Flux 2" – 5:45
3. "Shaker" – 13:00
4. "Left of the Neo-Left" – 1:12
5. "Lytton Perdu" – 13:25
6. "Voice Fragment" – 0:21
7. "Some Mother Blues" – 8:30
8. "What's Left of the Neo-Left" – 1:55

== Personnel ==
- Evan Parker – soprano saxophone, tenor saxophone, home made instruments, cassette recorder
- Paul Lytton – percussion, electronics, sounds, noises
