= The Music Improvisation Company =

Studio album by the Music Improvisation Company
- Released: 1970
- Recorded: August 25–27, 1970
- Studios: Merstham Studios, London
- Genre: Free jazz
- Length: 46:04
- Label: ECM
- Producer: Manfred Eicher

The Music Improvisation Company chronology
The Music Improvisation Company (1970)	The Music Improvisation Company 1968–1971 (1976)

Evan Parker chronology
The Topography of the Lungs (1970)	The Music Improvisation Company (1970)	Collective Calls (Urban) (Two Microphones) (1971)

Derek Bailey chronology
The Topography of the Lungs (1970)	The Music Improvisation Company (1970)	Improvisations for Cello and Guitar (1971)

The Music Improvisation Company is the debut album by the Music Improvisation Company, recorded over three days in August 1970 and released by ECM Records later that year. The album features saxophonist Evan Parker, guitarist Derek Bailey, Hugh Davies on various self-made electronic instruments, and percussionist Jamie Muir, with guest vocalist Christine Jeffrey appearing on two tracks.

== Reception ==
Professional ratings
Review scores
Source	Rating
AllMusic	3/5 stars
Tom Hull	B

AllMusic's Chris Kelsey said, "Although the musicians were conversant in jazz styles, the music made by the MIC was essentially and intentionally non-idiomatic, drawing upon any and all elements of musical thought and given voice in the moment. The resulting music was dissonant, discontinuous, and ultimately in the vanguard of improvised music."

Tyran Grillo of ECM blog Between Sound and Space wrote, "As can be expected from one look at the roster, the musicianship is excellent. Evan Parker steals the show with his bubbling outbursts of indiscernible melody while Bailey cultivates an even more anonymous approach, cutting in and out with a surgeon’s touch. In the end, such a project can only be what one makes of it. Its difficulties are also what make it go down smoothly, even as its effortless approach renders it impossible to fathom. It is a mysterious object, to be sure, and one that casts a new reflection with every turn."

== Track listing ==
All music is composed by Derek Bailey, Hugh Davies, Jamie Muir and Evan Parker.

Side I
No.	Title	Lyrics	Length
1.	"Third Stream Boogaloo" (with Christine Jeffrey)	Jeffrey	2:40
2.	"Dragon Path"		10:25
3.	"Packaged Eel"		8:43
Total length:			21:48

Side II
No.	Title	Lyrics	Length
1.	"Untitled No. I"		7:06
2.	"Untitled No. II" (with Christine Jeffrey)	Jeffrey	7:33
3.	"Tuck"		3:05
4.	"Wolfgang van Gangbang"		6:54
Total length:			24:38 46:26

== Personnel ==
=== The Music Improvisation Company ===
- Derek Bailey – electric guitar
- Evan Parker – soprano saxophone
- Hugh Davies – electronics
- Jamie Muir – percussion

=== Guest ===
- Christine Jeffrey – vocals (tracks 1 & 5)

=== Technical personnel ===
- Manfred Eicher – producer
- Jenny Thor – engineer
- B & B Wojirsch – design
- Werner Bethsold – photography
