= Dead or Alive (album) =

Live album by FURT (Richard Barrett and Paul Obermayer)
- Released: 2004
- Recorded: May 6, 2002; June 27, 2004
- Venue: Conway Hall, London
- Studio: Durham University electronic music studio, Durham, England
- Genre: Free improvisation, electronic, noise, glitch
- Length: 1:10:18
- Label: Psi; 04.09

FURT chronology
Defekt (2002)	Dead or Alive (2004)	Omnivm (2006)

Dead or Alive is an album by the electronic music duo FURT, consisting of Richard Barrett and Paul Obermayer. Track one, "Mice," documents a studio performance recorded on June 27, 2004, at the Durham University electronic music studio in Durham, England, while the second track, "Sad Fantasy," is a recording of a live performance at Conway Hall, London, dating from May 6, 2002. The album was released in 2004 by Psi Records.

== Reception ==
Professional ratings
Review scores
Source	Rating
AllMusic	4/5 stars
The Penguin Guide to Jazz	4/4 stars

In a review for AllMusic, François Couture called the album "one of Furt's finest documents," describing it as "exhausting, but highly rewarding and unique," and writing: "Richard Barrett and Paul Obermayer throw sounds back and forth at each other, accumulating a staggering range of sources, densely stacked in a rarely blinking 'piece' that never tumbles into noise-for-noise's-sake. This shapeshifting assemblage creates its own inner logic, the same way a ferocious Peter Brötzmann quartet improv finds its own path."

The authors of The Penguin Guide to Jazz Recordings awarded the album a full four stars, and stated: "Barrett and Obermayer are not in thrall to their machines. It is quite simply no longer possible to tell what or who is producing the sounds, a situation that collapses the dull human/machine compo/impro binaries which have hamstrung debate in this area."

Paris Transatlantic's Dan Warburton praised "Mice" for its "convincing overall shape and the sheer variety of material sampled and mangled, a veritable treasure trove of stock new music sounds," and, regarding "Sad Fantasy," commented: "it's mighty impressive stuff, and about as exhausting as Thomas Lehn and Marcus Schmickler's amazing Erstwhile duo a few years ago, Bart."

Martin Longley of the BBC remarked: "Barrett and Obermayer sustain an intense atmosphere of busy resourcefulness, filling their long developments with an impressively contrasting range of sound. Their experimentation never loses its vital lust for visceral thrills."

== Track listing ==
1. "Mice" – 37:47
2. "Sad Fantasy" – 32:31

== Personnel ==
- Richard Barrett – electronics
- Paul Obermayer – electronics
