= Saxophone Solos =

Live album by Evan Parker
- Released: 1976
- Recorded: June 17, 1975, and September 9, 1975
- Venue: Unity Theatre, London
- Studio: FMP Studio, Berlin
- Genre: Free improvisation
- Label: Incus; 19

Evan Parker chronology
The London Concert (1975)	Saxophone Solos (1976)	Monoceros (1978)

Saxophone Solos is a solo soprano saxophone album by Evan Parker. Three of the tracks were recorded live on June 17, 1975, at the Unity Theatre in London, and the remaining music was recorded on September 9, 1975, at the FMP Studio in Berlin. The album was initially released on LP in 1976 by Incus Records, and was reissued on CD in 1995 by Chronoscope records with nine additional tracks bearing subtitles from Samuel Beckett, again on CD in 2009 by Psi Records (with the extra tracks), and again on LP in 2021 by Otoroku Records (with just the original four tracks). The contents of the album, plus a previously missing track from the studio session, were also included in a 1989 limited-edition box set compilation titled Collected Solos, issued by Cadillac Distribution.

In a 2020 interview, Parker stated that the live tracks were recorded at his first solo performance. Although he originally objected to the idea of doing a solo recording, he relented when he realized that it could involve a dialogue with his instrument, rather than with another "mind." When asked about the use of the term "aerobatics" for track titles, he responded: "What's in a name? It has a quality which either speaks to the listener or not. It is a poetic conceit."

== Reception ==
Professional ratings
Review scores
Source	Rating
AllMusic	4.5/5 stars
The Penguin Guide to Jazz	4/4 stars

In a review for AllMusic, Thom Jurek wrote: "these solos are for the most part beyond the reach of even music to describe... These pieces are about sonic texture, tonality and atonality, and why they're both the same thing, and they reveal also the mechanical possibilities for the instrument that weren't even considered before he came along -- things like playing in all three registers of the instrument at the same time... These early recordings of Parker's solo performances pointed the way for a body of music that is singular in its achievement, and stand the test of time on their own as brilliant, investigative, and provocative works of a musical firebrand."

The authors of The Penguin Guide to Jazz awarded the album 4 stars, and stated that the music addresses "those moments when language cedes to silence, non-communication and sheer physicality... Parker can be heard experimenting with duration, changing the colour of sound even as pitches are sustained, but also using multiphonics to collapse the vertical organization of jazz... in favour of sounds that have mass but no single obvious direction and destination."

Writing for All About Jazz, Martin Longley commented: "Parker is intent on a relentless investigation of sustained high-pitch kettle-whistling tones, expertly manipulated into diamond hardness. He's also using space and restraint between the multiphonic events, often isolating sounds for single-minded savoring... He plays as if possessed... The listener is right there, on site, as these new approaches are being explored... this vintage set can be characterized as a rupturing outburst, directed with steely control." AAJ's John Eyles stated: "Those 'Aerobatics' titles were well chosen; Parker performs the musical equivalents of looping the loop, barrel rolling and spinning, defying gravity. And to do so, he needed concentration and stamina equal to any stunt pilot... this is not only of historical interest but also fine music in its own right."

== Track listing ==
=== 1976 and 2021 LP releases ===
1. "Aerobatics 1" – 16:20
2. "Aerobatics 4" – 3:48
3. "Aerobatics 2" – 6:30
4. "Aerobatics 3" – 14:25

=== 1995 and 2009 CD releases ===
1. "Aerobatics 1" – 16:24
2. "Aerobatics 2" – 6:33
3. "Aerobatics 3" – 14:29
4. "Aerobatics 4" – 3:46
5. "Aerobatics 5 'The light of the understanding and the fire'" – 6:57
6. "Aerobatics 6 'Equinox, memorable equinox'" – 3:54
7. "Aerobatics 7 'Shadows of the evening'" – 1:44
8. "Aerobatics 8 'The dark nurse'" – 5:25
9. "Aerobatics 9 'Not with the fire in me now'" – 2:23
10. "Aerobatics 11 'Shadows of the opus... magnum'" – 6:01
11. "Aerobatics 12 'The vision at last'" – 0:10
12. "Aerobatics 13 'And the aspirations'" – 3:34
13. "Aerobatics 14 'And the resolutions'" – 6:58
- Tracks 1–3 recorded at the Unity Theatre in London on June 17, 1975. Remaining tracks recorded at the FMP Studio in Berlin on September 9, 1975. "Aerobatics 10 'Crest of the wave or thereabouts'", also recorded in Berlin on September 9, 1975, and missing from Saxophone Solos, was included in Collected Solos (Cadillac, 1989).

== Personnel ==
- Evan Parker – soprano saxophone
