= The Topography of the Lungs =

Studio album by Evan Parker, Derek Bailey & Han Bennink
- Released: 1970
- Recorded: 13 July 1970
- Genre: Free improvisation; European free jazz
- Length: 43:09
- Label: Incus

Evan Parker chronology
The Topography of the Lungs (1970)	The Music Improvisation Company (1970)

Derek Bailey chronology
The Topography of the Lungs (1970)	The Music Improvisation Company (1970)

Han Bennink chronology
Balls (1970)	The Topography of the Lungs (1970)	Fragments (1971)

The Topography of the Lungs is an album by saxophonist Evan Parker, guitarist Derek Bailey and percussionist Han Bennink recorded in London on 13 July, 1970 and became the first release on the Incus label. It is considered a milestone of the free improvisation genre.

== Background ==
Incus Records was founded by journalist Michael Walters, who approached drummer Tony Oxley who brought in guitarist Derek Bailey and saxophonist Evan Parker who had played in the Spontaneous Music Ensemble to oversee the music policy. Original copies of the album came with a typed letter that stated:

The bulk of the revenue from any Incus recording will go directly to the musicians....
Once the basic cost of each record is recovered,
thus providing the finance for the next,
the vast bulk of all income will be paid in royalties to the artists.
Incus has no intention of making profits in the conventional sense.

The album's back cover consists of a collage of encyclopedia pages and brief phrases such as "Frederick Rzewski writes about free improvisation and makes sense" and "If you like to draw or paint, this booklet could help change your life."

The album was reissued in 2006 by Evan Parker's label Psi, with two bonus tracks ("Found Elsewhere 1" and "2"). In addition to the old cover art, the new front cover establishes that this date was under Evan Parker's leadership.

== Reception ==
Professional ratings
Review scores
Source	Rating
Allmusic	4.5/5 stars

The Allmusic review by Dan Warburton called it "one of the landmark early albums of English free improvisation" and states "Despite the music's furious energy – verging at times on the downright violent, thanks in no small part to the irrepressible Bennink – proceedings do not lack a sense of humor". Henry Kuntz wrote that "the importance of a record such as Topography of the Lungs can now be heard as an intuitive first leap in the direction of independent expression, of the players stepping forward and taking a fully assertive role in the making of the music rather than one of mainly responding to/interacting with the environment around them".

== Track listing ==
All compositions by Evan Parker, Derek Bailey and Han Bennink.

1. "Titan Moon" – 20:53
2. "For Peter B. & Peter K." – 4:39
3. "Fixed Elsewhere" – 5:09
4. "Dogmeat" – 12:27
5. "Found Elsewhere 1" – 4:44 Bonus track on CD reissue
6. "Found Elsewhere 2" – 4:52 Bonus track on CD reissue

== Personnel ==
- Evan Parker – tenor saxophone (tracks 1, 3 & 4), soprano saxophone (tracks 2, 5 & 6)
- Derek Bailey – guitar
- Han Bennink – percussion
