= Naan Tso =

2005 studio album by Foxes Fox

Studio album by Foxes Fox (Evan Parker, Steve Beresford, John Edwards, and Louis Moholo)
- Released: 2005
- Recorded: October 27, 2004
- Studio: Gateway Studios, London
- Genre: Free improvisation
- Length: 1:09:01
- Label: Psi; 05.07

Naan Tso is an album by the free improvisation ensemble known as Foxes Fox, featuring saxophonist Evan Parker, pianist Steve Beresford, double bassist John Edwards, and drummer Louis Moholo-Moholo. It was recorded on October 27, 2004, at Gateway Studios in London, and was released in 2005 by Psi Records. The album was recorded five years after the group's debut album, and roughly a year prior to the departure of Moholo-Moholo, who moved back to his native South Africa in September 2005 after years of exile in England.

== Reception ==
Professional ratings
Review scores
Source	Rating
AllMusic	3.5/5 stars
The Guardian	3/5 stars
The Penguin Guide to Jazz	4/4 stars

In a review for AllMusic, François Couture wrote: "Though the music is free to (and does) go anywhere, the listener usually knows what to expect -- and Naan Tso does not disappoint: dynamic playing, fierce exchanges between tenor sax and piano, delicate work from bass and drums, and a willingness to share collective fun with the listener."

The authors of The Penguin Guide to Jazz Recordings awarded the album a full 4 stars, and stated: "The music is full of exuberant energy, but with a sepia glaze that is redolent of sorrow and loss as well... while the main axis of energy seems to come from saxophone and drums... Edwards and Beresford play their full and subtle part in this."

The Guardian's John Fordham called the album "fierce free-jazz, but majestically compelling," and commented: "the constant urging of Moholo's swing, the splashy high-note effects of Beresford and the elemental roar of Edwards' bass provides a dramatic landscape for Parker's restlessly inventive journeys."

John Eyles of One Final Note noted that the musicians "are as wily an improvising foursome as one could hope to encounter," and remarked: "Although recorded in the studio, these performances have the energy and spontaneity of a live gig... [Parker's] stream of invention... is so relentless as to make one's head reel, and the only way to appreciate it is to surrender and be swept along. The music often feels as much free jazz as improv, despite all four players being equal and unconstrained; the key to this seems to lie with Moholo, whose playing brings a subtle pulse that provides momentum, maybe even discipline."

== Track listing ==
Music by Evan Parker, John Edwards, Louis Moholo, and Steve Beresford.

1. "Naan Tso" – 30:58
2. "Slightly Foxed" – 8:43
3. "Reinecke Gefettet" – 13:56
4. "Renard Pale" – 15:24

== Personnel ==
- Evan Parker – tenor saxophone
- Steve Beresford – piano
- John Edwards – double bass
- Louis Moholo-Moholo – percussion
