= Solo Guitar (Derek Bailey album) =

Studio album by Derek Bailey
- Released: 1971
- Recorded: February 1971
- Genre: Free improvisation
- Label: Incus

Derek Bailey chronology
Improvisations for Cello and Guitar (1970)	Solo Guitar (1971)	Derek Bailey & Han Bennink (1972)

Solo cover

Solo Guitar (later referred to as Volume 1) is a solo album by guitarist Derek Bailey which was recorded in London in February 1971 and became the second release by Incus. A revised version of this album with alternative improvisations was released as Solo in 1978. In 1995 a CD version incorporating improvisations from the original and revised LPs was released. In 2017 Honest Jon's issued a 45 RPM double LP edition that added one more track on side D, a 1972 improvisation at York University.

== Reception ==
Professional ratings
Review scores
Source	Rating
AllMusic	4/5 stars
The Penguin Guide to Jazz Recordings	3/4 stars

The AllMusic review by Brian Olewnick called it "required listening for any self-respecting Derek Bailey fan and a fascinating, complex, and ultimately delicious disc on its own merits... one of the landmark early albums of English free improvisation" and states "No one, absolutely no one, was playing guitar like this in 1971. ...Bailey occupied a universe of his own, freely improvising with little reference to the jazz tradition (including free jazz), sending splinters of notes into the ether and summoning ringing feedback from the deep innards of his ax".

== Track listing ==
All compositions by Derek Bailey except where noted.

1. "Improvisation 4" – 2:02
2. "Improvisation 5" – 7:43
3. "Improvisation 6" – 5:29
4. "Improvisation 7" – 3:10
5. "Where Is the Police?" (Misha Mengelberg) – 8:25
6. "Christiani Eddy" (Willem Breuker) – 5:50
7. "The Squirrel and the Ricketty-Racketty Bridge" (Gavin Bryars) – 6:31
8. "Improvisation 3" – 2:41 (bonus track on CD reissue)
9. "Improvisation 8" – 4:19 (bonus track on CD reissue)
10. "Improvisation 9" – 1:52 (bonus track on CD reissue)
11. "Improvisation 10" – 3:04 (bonus track on CD reissue)
12. "Improvisation 11" – 2:16 (bonus track on CD reissue)
13. "Improvisation 12" – 3:46 (bonus track on CD reissue)
14. "Improvisation: York, 24.2.1972" – 14:35 (bonus track on 2017 LP edition)

== Personnel ==
- Derek Bailey – electric guitar, electric guitar unamplified, acoustic guitar (2 acoustic guitars at the same time not double-tracked), VCS 3 synthesizer

Technical

- Bob Woolford, Hugh Davies – recording
