= Gerd Dudek =

German jazz musician (1938–2022)

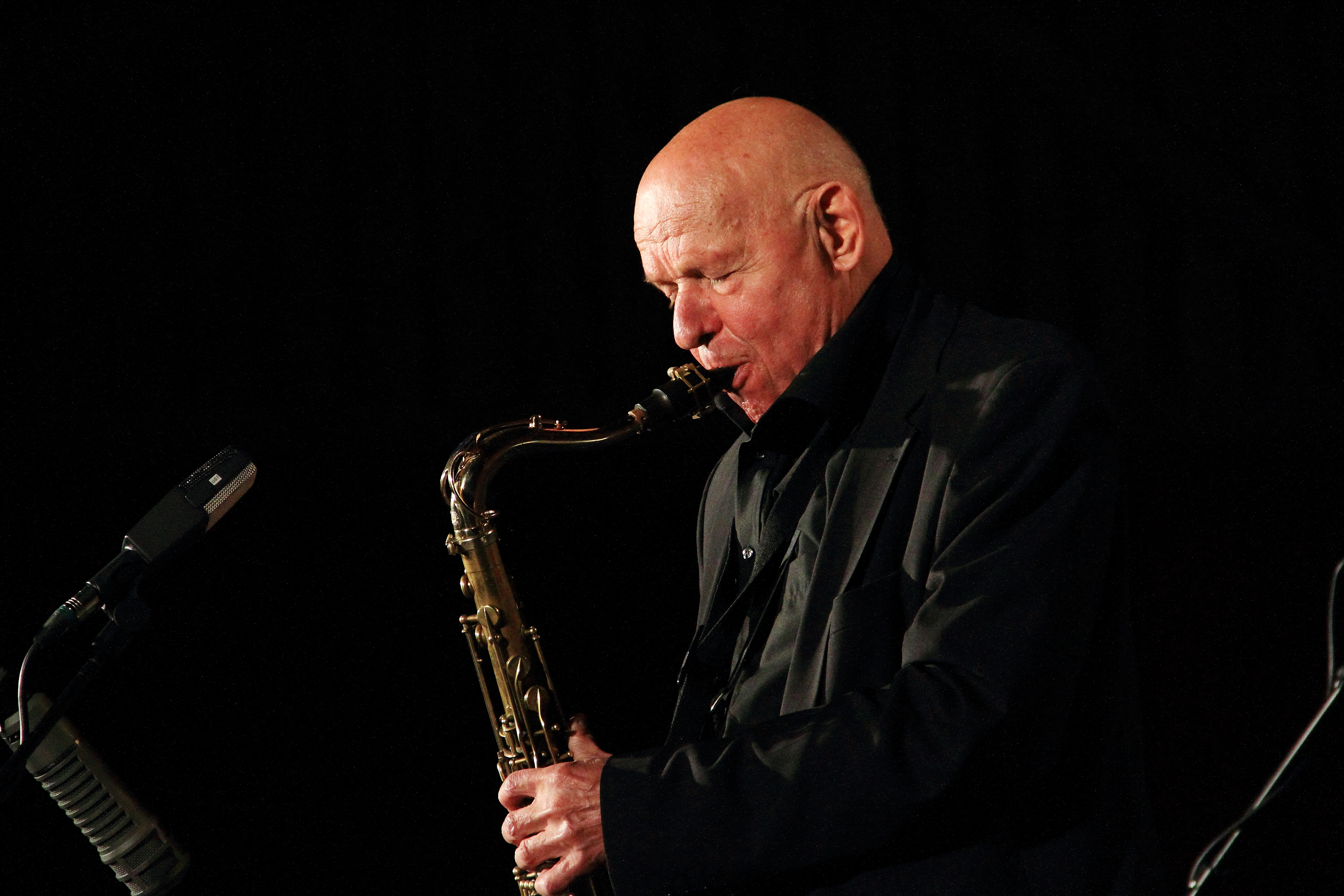

Background information
- Born: Gerhard Rochus Dudek; 28 September 1938
- Died: 3 November 2022 (aged 84)
- Genres: Jazz
- Instruments: Tenor saxophone; soprano saxophone; clarinet; flute

Gerhard Rochus "Gerd" Dudek (28 September 1938 – 3 November 2022) was a German jazz tenor and soprano saxophonist, clarinetist and flautist.

Dudek studied clarinet privately and attended music school in the 1950s, before joining a big band led by his brother Ossi until 1958. During the early 1960s, Dudek played in the Berliner Jazz Quintet, in Karl Blume's group and in Kurt Edelhagen's orchestra until 1965. He then became interested in free music and joined Manfred Schoof's quintet. Dudek took part in the first sessions of The Globe Unity Orchestra in 1966, and played with them at various times into the 1980s. He also worked with many other European free musicians and composers, including Alexander von Schlippenbach, Loek Dikker and The Waterland Ensemble And European Jazz Quintet.

Dudek was best known for his work with Manfred Schoof, Wolfgang Dauner, Lala Kovacev, the Globe Unity Orchestra, Berlin Contemporary Jazz Orchestra, Albert Mangelsdorff, Don Cherry and George Russell.

Dudek died on 3 November 2022, at the age of 84.

== Discography ==
=== As leader ===
- 'Smatter (Psi, 2002)
- Day and Night (Psi, 2012)
- With You (JazzJazz, 2023)

=== As co-leader ===
- Flying to the Sky (Trio, 1971) with Takehiro Honda
- Morning Rise (Ego, 1977) with Alan Skidmore, Adelhard Roidinger, and Branislav Kovačev
- Open (FMP, 1979) with Buschi Niebergall and Edward Vesala
- After All (Konnex, 1991) with Ali Haurand and Rob van den Broeck
- Pulque (Konnex, 1993) with Ali Haurand and Rob van den Broeck
- Crossing Level (Konnex, 1997) with Rob van den Broeck, Ali Haurand and Tony Levin
- Schinderkarren Mit Büffet (Konnex, 2002) with Paul Eßer, Ali Haurand and Jiri Stivin
- The Art of Duo (Laika, 2005) with Michael Mikolaschek
- Lyrik & Jazz Cascaden (Konnex, 2006) with Ingeborg Drews and Ali Haurand
- Sound Solutions (self-released, 2013) with Max Bolleman and Rob van den Broeck
- Nunc! (Nemu, 2014) with Misha Mengelberg, Dirk Bell, Ryan Carniaux, Joscha Oetz, and Nils Tegen
- Two of Us Are One (Shaa, 2015) with Stefan Heidtmann
- Live (self-released, 2021) with the Hans Koller Trio

=== As sideman ===
With the Berlin Contemporary Jazz Orchestra

- Berlin Contemporary Jazz Orchestra (ECM, 1990)
- Live in Japan '96 (DIW, 1997)

With Wolfgang Dauner

- Free Action (SABA, 1967)
- Requiem / Psalmus Spei (MPS, 1969)

With the European Jazz Ensemble

- 20th Anniversary Tour (Konnex, 1997)
- 25th Anniversary Tour (Konnex, 2002)
- 30 Years on the Road (Konnex, 2006) DVD
- 35th Anniversary Tour (Konnex, 2011)

With the European Jazz Quintet

- Live At Moers Festival (Moers, 1977)
- European Jazz Quintet (Ego, 1978)
- European Jazz Quintet III (Fusion, 1982)

With the German All Stars

- Live at the Domicile (MPS, 1971)
- Out of Each/German All Stars in Japan (Columbia, 1971)

With the Globe Unity Orchestra

- Live in Wuppertal (FMP, 1973)
- Evidence, Vol 1 (FMP, 1976)
- Into the Valley, Vol 2 (FMP, 1976)
- Pearls (FMP, 1977)
- Jahrmarkt / Local Fair (PTR/JWD, 1977)
- Improvisations (Japo, 1978)
- Compositions (Japo, 1979)
- Hamburg '74 (FMP, 1979)
- Intergalactic Blow (Japo, 1983)
- Rumbling (FMP, 1991)
- 20th Anniversary (FMP, 1993)
- Globe Unity 67 & 70 (Atavistic, 2001)
- Globe Unity 40 Years (Intakt, 2008)
- Live In Berlin (Jazzwerkstatt, 2010)
- Baden-Baden '75 (FMP, 2011)
- ...Und Jetzt Die Sportschau (Trost, 2013)
- Globe Unity 50 Years (Intakt, 2018)

With Alexander von Schlippenbach

- Globe Unity (SABA, 1967)

With Manfred Schoof

- Voices (CBS, 1966)
- Manfred Schoof Sextet (Wergo, 1967)
- European Echoes (FMP, 1969)
- The Early Quintet (FMP, 1978)
- Reflections (Mood, 1984)

With others

- With Peter Brötzmann: Fuck de Boere (Atavistic, 2001)
- With Jack Bruce: Somethin Els (CMP, 1993)
- With Can: The Lost Tapes (Spoon, 2012)
- With Gabi Delgado: Mistress (Virgin, 1983)
- With Drum Circus: Magic Theatre (Garden Of Delights, 2003)
- With Kurt Edelhagen and His Orchestra: The Unreleased WDR Jazz Recordings 1957 - 1974 (Jazzline, 2021)
- With Kurt Edelhagen and Wolfgang Sauer: Kurt Edelhagen - Wolfgang Sauer (Amiga, 1965)
- With European Jazz Trio: European Jazz Trio (Konnex, 2013)
- With Four for Jazz: Sunday Child (Spiegelei, 1972)
- With Peter Giger: A Drum Is a Woman - The Best of Peter Giger (Intuition, 2006)
- With Guru Guru: Mani und seine Freunde (Atlantic, 1975)
- With Ján Hajnal: Dedication (Hevhetia, 2020)
- With Hellmut Hattler: Bassball (Harvest, 1977)
- With Ali Haurand: Ballads (Konnex, 2005)
- With Horns Ensemble (Günter Christmann, Albert Mangelsdorff, Paul Rutherford, Manfred Schoof, Kenny Wheeler): Horns (FMP, 1979)
- With Knut Kiesewetter: Stop! Watch! and Listen! (MPS, 1970)
- With Joachim Kühn: This Way Out (MPS, 1973)
- With Lerryn: Goya Malt Karl IV (Columbia, 1978)
- With Albert Mangelsdorff: Birds of Underground (MPS, 1973)
- With Krzysztof Penderecki and Don Cherry: Actions (Philips, 1971)
- With Oscar Pettiford: We Get the Message (Sonorama, 2015)
- With Dieter Reith: Reith On! (Motor, 1999)
- With Irmin Schmidt: Villa Wunderbar (Spoon, 2013)
- With Wolfgang Schmidtke: Monk! (Jazzwerkstatt, 2018)
- With Tobias Sudhoff: Polarlichter (Laika, 2004)
- With Third Eye: Connexion (Ring, 1977)
- With various artists: Gittin' to Know Y'All (MPS, 1970)
- With various artists: Free Zone Appleby 2005 (Psi, 2006)
- With the Wunsch / Strauch Sextet: Joana's Waltz (Jazz'N'Arts, 2005)
