= Incus Records =

British record company and label

- Founded: 1970
- Founder: Derek Bailey; Tony Oxley; Evan Parker
- Genre: Free jazz, free improvisation
- Country of origin: UK
- Location: London, England
- Official website: www.incusrecords.force9.co.uk

Incus Records is a British record company and label founded by Derek Bailey, Tony Oxley, Evan Parker and Michael Walters that specializes in free jazz and improvised music.

The first release on the label was Incus Number 0 (zero), a 7 “ record with AMM LIVE, after that came Incus Number 1, The Topography of the Lungs, recorded by Bailey, Parker, and percussionist Han Bennink in 1970. Walters and Oxley left the label shortly after its founding, after which it continued as a partnership between Bailey and Parker until a falling-out between the two men in the mid-1980s. Parker left in 1987. Bailey continued the label with Karen Brookman until his death in 2005. Its first CD release was CYRO, a duo recording of Bailey and percussionist Cyro Baptista. In later years the label has issued videos and limited-edition CDRs intended largely for friends and faithful collectors. It relaunched with a new website and a full catalogue in early 2009.

Aside from recordings by Bailey and Parker (who also produced), the Incus catalogue includes the work of Barry Guy, Howard Riley, Kenny Wheeler, Steve Lacy, and John Zorn.

At various times since 1985, Incus Records sponsored festivals of improvised music in London.

== Discography ==
Catalog No.	Artist	Album	Notes
Incus 1	Evan Parker, Derek Bailey, Han Bennink	The Topography of the Lungs	Subsequently released with two bonus tracks on CD on the Psi label credited to Evan Parker
Incus 2	Derek Bailey	Solo Guitar	A revised version of this album, with alternative improvisations, was released as Solo (Incus 2R) in 1978. A CD version, incorporating improvisations from the original and revised LPs was released in 1993
Incus 3/4	Paul Rutherford, Derek Bailey, Barry Guy	Iskra 1903	An expanded three-CD set comprising the music on this double LP plus 10 bonus tracks was released on Emanem as Chapter One 1970-1972 in 2000
Incus 5	Evan Parker, Paul Lytton	Collective Calls (Urban) (Two Microphones)	Released on CD in 2002 on the Psi label
Incus 6/7	Barry Guy/The London Jazz Composer's Orchestra	Ode	Released on CD in 1996 on Intakt Records
Incus 8	Tony Oxley	Tony Oxley	
Incus 9	Derek Bailey, Han Bennink	Derek Bailey & Han Bennink	
Incus 10	Kenny Wheeler	Song for Someone	Released on CD in 2004 on the Psi label
Incus 11	Balance	Balance	Radu Malfatti, Ian Brighton, Phil Wachsmann, Colin Wood, Frank Perry
Incus 12	Derek Bailey	Lot 74: Solo Improvisations	Released on CD by Incus in 2009
Incus 13	Howard Riley	Synopsis	Released on CD by Emanem in 2000 with one bonus track
Incus 14	Evan Parker, Paul Lytton	At the Unity Theatre	Released on CD with bonus tracks on Psi in 2003
Incus 15	Steve Beresford, Nigel Coombes, John Russell, Dave Solomon, Garry Todd	Teatime	Released on CD on the Emanem label in 2009
Incus 16	Evan Parker, Derek Bailey	The London Concert	Recorded live at Wigmore Hall, London. Released on CD, with bonus tracks, on Psi in 2005
Incus 17	Evan Parker, Derek Bailey, Hugh Davies, Jamie Muir	The Music Improvisation Company 1968-1971	Released by Incus on CD in 1992
Incus 18	Tony Oxley	February Papers	
Incus 19	Evan Parker	Saxophone Solos	Released by Psi on CD in 2009
Incus 20	Derek Bailey, Tristan Honsinger	Duo	
Incus 21	Company	Company I	Derek Bailey, Evan Parker, Tristan Honsinger, Maarten Altena
Incus 22	Barry Guy,	Statements V-XI: For Double Bass and Violone	
Incus 23	Company	Company 2	Derek Bailey, Anthony Braxton, Evan Parker
Incus 24	Spontaneous Music Ensemble	Biosystem	John Stevens, Roger Smith, Nigel Coombes, Colin Wood
Incus 25	Company	Company 3	Derek Bailey, Han Bennink
Incus 26	Company	Company 4	Derek Bailey, Steve Lacy
Incus 27	Evan Parker	Monoceros	Released on CD in 1999 on Chronoscope
Incus 28	Company	Company 5	Derek Bailey, Leo Smith, Steve Lacy, Evan Parker, Anthony Braxton, Tristan Honsinger, Maarten Altena
Incus 29	Company	Company 6	Derek Bailey, Leo Smith, Evan Parker, Anthony Braxton, Lol Coxhill, Steve Lacy, Steve Beresford, Tristan Honsinger, Maarten Altena, Han Bennink
Incus 30	Company	Company 7	Derek Bailey, Leo Smith, Evan Parker, Anthony Braxton, Lol Coxhill, Steve Lacy, Steve Beresford, Tristan Honsinger, Maarten Altena, Han Bennink
Incus 31	John Russell/Richard Coldman	Home Cooking/Guitar Solos	split album
Incus 32	Gary Todd, Roger Turner	Sunday Best	
Incus 33	David Toop, Paul Burwell, Hugh Davies, Max Eastley, Paul Lovens, Paul Lytton, Annabel Nicolson, Evan Parker	Circadian Rhythm	
Incus 34	Derek Bailey, Tony Coe	Time	
Incus 35	Evan Parker, George E. Lewis	From Saxophone & Trombone	
Incus 36	Company	Fables	Derek Bailey, Dave Holland, George Lewis, Evan Parker
Incus 37	Various Artists	Pisa 1980 Improvisors' Symposium	Evan Parker & George Lewis/Maarten Altena & Derek Bailey/Barry Guy, Paul Lovens, Paul Lytton, Evan Parker & Phil Wachsmann/Maarten Altena, Barry Guy, George Lewis, Paul Rutherford & Giancarlo Schiaffini
Incus 38	Company	Fictions	Derek Bailey, Steve Beresford, Lol Coxhill, Ian Croall, Misha Mengelberg
Incus 39	Evan Parker	Six of One	
Incus 40	Derek Bailey	Aida	Released on CD in 1996 on Dexter's Cigar
Incus 41	Derek Bailey, Jamie Muir	Dart Drug	
Incus 42	Evan Parker, Barry Guy, Paul Lytton	Tracks	
Incus 43	Derek Bailey, Anthony Braxton	Royal Volume 1	
Incus 45	Evan Parker, George Lewis, Barry Guy, Paul Lytton	Hook, Drift & Shuffle	
Incus 46/47	Company	Epiphany	Derek Bailey, George Lewis, Akio Suzuki, Phil Wachsmann, Ursula Oppens, Fred Frith, Julie Tippetts, Anne LeBaron, Moto Yoshizawa
Incus 48	Derek Bailey	Notes	
Incus 49	Evan Parker	The Snake Decides	Released on CD on Psi in 2003
Incus 50	Derek Bailey, Evan Parker	Compatibles	
Incus 51	Company	Trios	Derek Bailey, John Corbett, Vinko Globokar, Evan Parker, Peter Brötzmann, J. D. Parran, Ernst Reyseger, Joëlle Léandre, Jamie Muir, Hugh Davies
Incus 52	Steve Noble, Alex Maguire	Live at Oscars	
Incus CD01	Derek Bailey, Cyro Baptista	Cyro	
Incus CD02	Derek Bailey, Han Bennink	Han	
Incus CD03	Tony Bevan, Greg Kingston, Matt Lewis	Original Gravity	
Incus CD04	Company	Once	Derek Bailey, Lee Konitz, Richard Teitelbaum, Carlos Zingaro, Tristan Honsinger, Barre Phillips, Steve Noble
Incus CD05	Derek Bailey, Barre Phillips	Figuring	
Incus CD06	Steve Noble, Alex Ward	Ya Boo, Reel & Rumble	
Incus CD07	Company	Company 6 & 7	Compilation of tracks from Incus 29 and Incus 30
Incus CD8	Tony Bevan, Steve Noble, Paul Rogers	Bigshots	
Incus CD9	Derek Bailey, Thebe Lipere, Louis Moholo	Village Life	
Incus CD10	Derek Bailey	Solo Guitar Volume 1	Reissue of Incus LP 2 and Incus LP 2R
Incus CD11	Derek Bailey	Solo Guitar Volume 2	
Incus CD12	Evan Parker, Derek Bailey, Hugh Davies, Jamie Muir	The Music Improvisation Company 1968-1971	Reissue of Incus 17
Incus CD13	Shaking Ray Levis	False Prophets or Dang Good Guessers!	
Incus CD14	John Stevens, Derek Bailey	Playing	
Incus CD15	Tony Oxley	The Tony Oxley Quartet	
Incus CD16	Company	Company 91 Volume 1	
Incus CD17	Company	Company 91 Volume 2	
Incus CD18	Company	Company 91 Volume 3	
Incus CD19	Jamie Muir, Derek Bailey	Dart Drug	Reissue of Incus 41
Incus CD20	John Zorn, Fred Frith	The Art of Memory	
Incus CD21	John Butcher, Vanessa Mackness	Respiritus	
Incus CD22	John Stevens, Kent Carter, Derek Bailey	One Time	
Incus CD23	Eugene Chadbourne, John Zorn	In Memory of Nikki Arane	
Incus CD24	Roger Smith, Neil Metcalfe	S&M	
Incus CD25	Alan Wilkinson, Stefan Jaworzyn	In a Sentimental Mood	
Incus CD26	Henry Kaiser, John Oswald	Improvised Vancouver	
Incus CD27	Steve Beresford, Dennis Palmer, Bob Stagner, Roger Turner	Short in the U.K.	
Incus CD28	Derek Bailey, John Butcher, Oren Marshall	Trio Playing	
Incus CD29/30	Derek Bailey, Tony Oxley	Soho Suites	
Incus CD31	Derek Bailey	Takes Fakes & Dead She Dances	
Incus CD32	George E. Lewis, Bertram Turetzky	Conversations	
Incus CD33	Paul Hession, Alan Wilkinson, Simon H. Fell, Joe Morris	Registered Firm	
Incus CD34	Derek Bailey, Han Bennink	Post Improvisation 1: When We're Smiling	
Incus CD35	Derek Bailey, Han Bennink	Post Improvisation 2: Air Mail Special	
Incus CD36	Derek Bailey, Susie Ibarra	Daedal	
Incus CD37	Derek Bailey, Alex Ward	LOCationAL	
Incus CD38	Mats Gustafsson, Jim O'Rourke	Xylophonen Virtuosen	
Incus CD39	Joseph Holbrooke	Joseph Holbrook '98	Derek Bailey, Gavin Bryars, Tony Oxley
Incus CD40	Derek Bailey, Keiji Haino	Songs	
Incus CD41	Company	Company 5	Reissue of Incus 28
Incus CD42/43	Company	Epiphany	Reissue of Incus 46/47
Incus CD44/45	Company	Company in Marseille	Derek Bailey, Rhodri Davies, Simon H. Fell, Will Gaines, Mark Wastell
Incus CD46	Acoustic Guitar Trio	Acoustic Guitar Trio	Nels Cline, Jim McAuley, Rod Poole
Incus CD47	Steve Noble, John Edwards, Alex Ward	False Face Society	
Incus CD48/49	Derek Bailey	New Sights, Old Sounds	
Incus CD50	Derek Bailey, Min Xiao-Fen	Flying Dragons	
Incus CD51	Derek Bailey, Julian Kytasty, Roger Turner, Alan Wilkinson	Duos, London 2001	
Incus CD52	Derek Bailey, Susie Ibarra	BIDS	
Incus CD53	Derek Bailey, Tristan Honsinger	Tristan (Duo)	
Incus CD54	Derek Bailey, Ingar Zach	Seven	
Incus CD55	Will Gaines	Rappin & Tappin	
Incus CD56	Limescale	Limescale	
Incus CD57	Derek Bailey	Lot 74	Reissue of Incus 12
Incus CD58	Derek Bailey, Agustí Fernández	A Silent Dance	
Incus CD59	Duck Baker	The Ducks Palace	
Incus CD60	Derek Bailey	More 74	
Incus CD61	Lol Coxhill, Alex Ward	Old Sights, New Sounds	
Incus CD62	Derek Bailey	Concert in Milwaukee	
Incus CD63	Tony Oxley, Derek Bailey, Paul Rutherford, Pat Thomas, Matt Wand, Phillip Wachsmann, Ian Brighton	A Birthday Tribute: 75 years	

== See also ==
- Lists of record labels
