= 'Smatter =

Studio album by Gerd Dudek
- Released: 2002
- Recorded: February 20, 1998
- Studios: Gateway Studios, London
- Genre: Jazz
- Length: 1:01:01
- Labels: Psi; 02.01
- Producer: Evan Parker

Gerd Dudek chronology
'Smatter (2002)	Day and Night (2012)

'Smatter is an album by saxophonist Gerd Dudek. It was recorded on February 20, 1998, at Gateway Studios in London, and was issued in 2002 by Psi Records as the label's second release. On the album, Dudek is joined by guitarist John Parricelli, double bassist Chris Laurence, and drummer Tony Levin. The album features three compositions by Kenny Wheeler, including the title track, plus three jazz standards.

Although Dudek had been active as a musician since the 1960s, and had participated as co-leader and sideman on a number of albums, 'Smatter is his debut as a leader. Saxophonist Evan Parker, who produced the album, and who founded Psi Records, remarked: "After so many years playing, so many recordings, can this really be the first record under his own name?"

== Reception ==
Professional ratings
Review scores
Source	Rating
All About Jazz	4.5/5 stars
AllMusic	3/5 stars
The Guardian	4/5 stars
The Penguin Guide to Jazz Recordings	3.5/4 stars
The Virgin Encyclopedia of Jazz	3/5 stars

In a review for AllMusic, François Couture called the album "a nice straight-ahead session, elegant but lacking challenge."

The authors of The Penguin Guide to Jazz Recordings wrote: "the open tonality offered by Parricelli's guitar affords [Dudek] considerable space for manoeuvre. Once or twice, the much-discussed Clifford Jordan influence comes to the fore, though oddly it's John Gilmore one thinks of on 'Body and Soul'."

John Eyles of All About Jazz described the album as "both surprising and wonderful," and commented: "This music was recorded as long ago as February 1998. The fact that it has remained unreleased for four years is inexplicable; we owe Parker and Psi a debt of gratitude. For Evan Parker to release another saxophonist on his own label speaks volumes; Dudek more than lives up to that vote of confidence."

The Guardian's John Fordham called the album "a smokily lyrical set with a fine British rhythm section," and commented: "Dudek's sound is langourously atmospheric, and his phrasing is often at fascinating angles to the structure. The account of 'Body and Soul'... is particularly memorable."

Writing for JazzTimes, Bill Shoemaker described Dudek as "the best tenor saxophonist you've never heard of," and stated that 'Smatter is "immensely satisfying." He praised the saxophonist's "economy of thought and... precision in emotional projection, even in his most syntactically elaborate flourishes, and remarked: "it is obvious that Dudek has the gravitas that eludes all but a handful of tenor players from a given generation. His frank, unforced sound conveys the compounding of worldliness and world-weariness that comes with middle age."

Peter Marsh of the BBC wrote: "this is an album of tastefully executed, tuneful modern jazz that would be worthy of a label like Enja or ECM... Though the influence of late John Coltrane made itself felt in Dudek's freer playing, here it's an earlier Coltrane, still steeped in Lester Young and Sonny Rollins, that filters through."

In an article for The New York City Jazz Record, Stuart Broomer called the album a "jewel... one of the most beautiful mainstream dates of the past decade, Dudek's gorgeous tone embellishing 'Body and Soul' and 'The Peacocks' with a grace comparable to Stan Getz."

== Track listing ==
1. "Phrase Three" (Kenny Wheeler) – 8:32
2. "Ma Bel" (Kenny Wheeler) – 6:31
3. "'Smatter" (Kenny Wheeler) – 7:11
4. "Body and Soul" (Johnny Green, Edward Heyman, Robert Sour, Frank Eyton) – 17:14
5. "By George" (George Coleman) – 11:44
6. "The Peacocks" (Jimmy Rowles) – 9:29

== Personnel ==
- Gerd Dudek – tenor saxophone, soprano saxophone
- John Parricelli – guitar
- Chris Laurence – double bass
- Tony Levin – drums
