= The Tony Oxley Quartet =

Studio album by The Tony Oxley Quartet
- Released: 1993
- Recorded: April 8, 1992
- Studio: WDR, Cologne
- Genre: Free jazz
- Length: 1:08:44
- Label: Incus Records; CD15

Tony Oxley chronology
In the Evenings Out There (1993)	The Tony Oxley Quartet (1993)	Sulphur (1995)

The Tony Oxley Quartet is an album by the group of the same name, led by percussionist Tony Oxley, and featuring guitarist Derek Bailey, keyboardist Pat Thomas, and electronic musician Matt Wand. It was recorded on April 8, 1992, at WDR, Cologne, and was released in 1993 by Incus Records.

== Reception ==
Professional ratings
Review scores
Source	Rating
AllMusic	2.5/5 stars
The Penguin Guide to Jazz	4/4 stars
The Encyclopedia of Popular Music	4/5 stars

In a review for AllMusic, Thom Jurek wrote: "The music here is experimental not only in the improvisational sense of the word, but in the actual practice of putting sounds together, pairing instruments and pulling them together in the context of a group setting." However, he noted that "for such a powerhouse band, this is a disappointing outing."

The authors of The Penguin Guide to Jazz Recordings awarded the album a full 4 stars, calling it "a magnificent and important (as well as enjoyable) modern document." They stated that Oxley "continues to make free rhythm and pulse out of crashings and bangings that in other hands would be, well, unmusical."

Author Ben Watson called the album "astonishing" and "the definitive encounter of Free Improvisation with post-eighties rave technology." He commented: "This is committed music played by musicians who want to improvise at the very edge of their technique and understanding; go with it and it's wondrous."

== Track listing ==
1. "Quartet 1" – 16:06
2. "Duo MP" – 5:08
3. "Duo TD" – 13:12
4. "Quartet 2" – 4:34
5. "Duo TM" – 8:47
6. "Duo TP" – 4:54
7. "Trio PMD" – 10:20
8. "Quartet 3" – 5:41

== Personnel ==
- Tony Oxley – percussion
- Derek Bailey – electric guitar
- Pat Thomas – electronics, keyboards
- Matt Wand – drum machine, tape switchboard
