= Conic Sections (album) =

Studio album by Evan Parker
- Released: 1993
- Recorded: June 21, 1989
- Studios: Holywell Music Room, Oxford, England
- Genre: Free improvisation
- Length: 1:10:30
- Labels: Ah Um; 015
- Producer: Nick Purnell

Evan Parker chronology
Process and Reality (1991)	Conic Sections (1993)	Imaginary Values (1994)

Conic Sections is a solo soprano saxophone album by Evan Parker. It was recorded on June 21, 1989, at Holywell Music Room in Oxford, England, and was released on CD in 1993 by Ah Um Records. In 2008, it was reissued by Parker's Psi label. The album is dedicated to the memory of Parker's friend Kunio Nakamura.

According to Parker, the recording came about when he decided to document the current state of his playing, and impulsively contacted recording engineer Michael Gerzon, who managed to book the Holywell Music Room on short notice. However, he later recalled: "The acoustics of the Rooms are so distinctive that I was pushed away from the kind of playing I'd had in mind; it seemed as though the room itself had something in mind too."

== Reception ==
Professional ratings
Review scores
Source	Rating
AllMusic	4.5/5 stars
The Encyclopedia of Popular Music	4/5 stars
The Penguin Guide to Jazz	3.5/4 stars

In a review for AllMusic, Thom Jurek wrote: "This is an exhausting yet exhilarating set to take in at one setting; it changes the listener's reality, turns it inside out for over 70 minutes, and allows one to hear, as music, some rather confounding sounds and breathing techniques. Amazing stuff."

Martin Longley of All About Jazz called the album "a significant work," and stated: "All of [Parker's] tics have now been bound together into a merged voice, providing an alternative form of minimalism that can also be, upon tilting the ears, considered as maximalism... Parker's development of circular breathing techniques had now opened up the potential for marathon flowing."

Writer John Fordham described the album as "a remarkable exposition of [Parker's] talents," and commented: "Parker's achievement is to create a saxophone soundscape of completely personal materials, with little or no references to orthodox idioms, yet deliver it with such intensity - and sometimes ferocity - as to make its vocabulary and syntax utterly logical."

Writing for Coda, Stuart Broomer remarked: "the music gains from the room's very lively acoustics. Parker seems to be playing the room as much as he is playing the saxophone, and the room seems to be joining in, playing the saxophone and the saxophonist."

In an article for Paris Transatlantic, Nate Dorward wrote: "this album marks the logical endpoint to Parker's solo music--he didn't record another until Lines Burnt in Light (2001), which just sounds like a footnote to this one – but it's still one of his most perfectly realized creations."

== Track listing ==
1. "Conic Section 1" – 17:20
2. "Conic Section 2" – 11:10
3. "Conic Section 3" – 25:10
4. "Conic Section 4" – 9:10
5. "Conic Section 5" – 7:40

== Personnel ==
- Evan Parker – soprano saxophone
