= Ensemble Studio6 =

Ensemble Studio6 is group of internationally active musicians dedicated to new music, based in Serbia. The ensemble founded in 2013 by trumpeter Nenad Marković and harpist Milana Zarić, and they had its first performance the same year in the Studio 6 of Radio Belgrade.

The ensemble works closely with Richard Barrett giving the premiere performances of his latest work.

== Members and associates of ensemble ==
- Nenad Marković, trumpet
- Milana Zarić, harp
- Karolina Bäter, recorder
- Vladimir Blagojević, accordion
- Ivana Grahovac, cello
- Svetlana Maraš, electronics, composition
- Richard Barrett, electronics, composition
- Teodora Stepančić, piano, composition
- Milena Pavlović, piano
- Jasna Veličković, electronics, composition
- Borislav Čičovački, oboe
