= At the Unity Theatre =

Live album by Evan Parker and Paul Lytton
- Released: 1975
- Recorded: January 7, 1975
- Venue: Unity Theatre, London
- Genre: Free jazz
- Labels: Incus; 14

Evan Parker chronology
| Collective Calls (Urban) (Two Microphones) (1972) | At the Unity Theatre (1975) | The London Concert (1975) |

At the Unity Theatre is a live album by saxophonist Evan Parker and drummer Paul Lytton. It was recorded in January 1975 at the Unity Theatre in London, and was released later that year by Incus Records. The album was reissued on CD, with three extra tracks, by Psi Records in 2003.

== Reception ==
Professional ratings
Review scores
| Source | Rating |
|---|---|
| AllMusic | 4/5 stars |
| The Penguin Guide to Jazz | 4/4 stars |
| The Guardian | 3/5 stars |

In a review for AllMusic, François Couture wrote that, in relation to Collective Calls (Urban) (Two Microphones),: "the music is overall more feverish and loud, but it loses nothing in subtlety and intelligence... 'In the Midst of Laughter and Glee'... stands as one of their best improvisations from that period... Lytton spends little time playing the drum kit in a conventional way. Instead he focuses on objects and scrap metal, but still makes quite a racket."

The authors of The Penguin Guide to Jazz awarded the album 4 stars, and stated: "Parker's usual armoury is extended on this occasion by the Lyttonophone, while Paul deploys an augmented kit and auxiliary sources. A classic."

Writing for The Guardian, John Fordham commented: "Unlike some free-improv of the day, it's very eventful; the music is varied, both texturally and dynamically. And it is fascinating simply as an insight into the evolution of Parker as a pioneer."

Derek Taylor, in a review for Dusted Magazine, remarked: "it's... fascinating to hear Parker's approach at this earlier interval in the development of his art. The requisite elements are all in place, but interestingly enough he largely abstains from the sort of serpentine circular breathing marathons that are his bread and butter today."

Writing for Bells, Henry Kuntz commented: "The music of Evan Parker and Paul Lytton is part of an ever growing body of music that is entirely improvised, improvisation now becoming an end in itself rather than a means to a predefined (and more constricted) end. Their new LP... is highly recommended."

== Track listing ==
=== Original 1975 LP release ===
1. "In The Midst Of Laughter And Glee" – 18:07
2. "On Reflection" – 5:31
3. "Mild Steel Rivets For P.H." – 14:50
4. "The Dirlston Dirler" – 7:30

=== Extra tracks on 2003 CD release ===
1. "Through Consensus" – 18:26
2. "To Unity" – 4:03
3. "Bonus Track" – 0:08

== Personnel ==
- Evan Parker – soprano saxophone, tenor saxophone, reeds, pole drum, bullroarer, cassette recorder
- Paul Lytton – percussion, electronics, voice
