= Jamie Muir =

Scottish painter and musician (1945–2025)

- Muir in 1973 with King Crimson
- Born: William James Graham Muir; 4 July 1945; Edinburgh, Scotland
- Died: 17 February 2025 (aged 79); Cornwall, England
- Education: Edinburgh College of Art
- Occupations: Painter and musician
- Musical career
- Instruments: Percussion; drums
- Formerly of: The Music Improvisation Company; Assagai; King Crimson

William James Graham Muir (4 July 1945 – 17 February 2025) was a Scottish painter and musician, best known for his work as the percussionist in King Crimson from 1972 to 1973, appearing prominently on their fifth album Larks' Tongues in Aspic. Following his departure from King Crimson, Muir returned to Scotland, where he pursued a monastic Buddhist lifestyle at Samye Ling Monastery. He returned to music in 1980, later contributing percussion to studio albums from Derek Bailey, Evan Parker, and Michael Giles, the latter of whom was a founding member of King Crimson. By 1990, Muir had permanently retired from music and focused his efforts on painting.

== Life and career ==
=== Early life and career ===
William James Graham Muir was born in Edinburgh, Scotland, on 4 July 1945. He attended the Edinburgh College of Art during the 1960s, and began playing jazz on trombone. He soon lost interest and switched to percussion, stating that he preferred to be "in the wilds of uncertainty". At that time, he listened to American jazz drummers such as Tony Williams, Kenny Clarke, and Milford Graves, and other musicians such as Pharoah Sanders, Albert Ayler, and the New York Art Quartet. Regarding his musical direction at the time, he stated: "I just had to improvise. The first time it felt really dangerous, like the sort of thing you had to lock the doors and close the curtains on because if anybody saw you, God would strike you down with a thunderbolt. But I took to it like a duck to water."

After moving to London, Muir worked with choreographer Lindsay Kemp, and was active in free improvisation, recording, and performing with Derek Bailey and Evan Parker in The Music Improvisation Company from 1968 to 1971. During this time, Muir began using various found objects as part of his percussion repertoire. Bailey enjoyed playing with Muir, recalling that he "seemed to be able to provide a different playing experience every time ... He fitted into this idea of having no particular preconceptions ... He was a highly reactive person, one of the things I really liked, there was the impression that he was slightly uncontrollable, on an edge."

After The Music Improvisation Company disbanded, Muir played in the band Boris with Don Weller and Jimmy Roche (both later of jazz-rock band Major Surgery) and put in a stint with Afro-rock band Assagai in which he met Canterbury scene keyboard player Alan Gowen. Muir and Gowen subsequently formed the experimental jazz-rock band Sunship with guitarist Allan Holdsworth and bass player Laurie Baker, although Muir has admitted that they "spent more time laughing than playing music" and suggests that the band played no gigs and got no further than rehearsals.

=== King Crimson ===
In the summer of 1972, Muir received a call from Robert Fripp, and was invited to join what was to become a new incarnation of King Crimson, with a lineup that came to be, according to Muir, focused on "group potential and creating monstrous power in music." During his tenure with the band, Muir occasionally played a standard drum kit, but more often he contributed an assortment of unusual sounds from a wide variety of percussion instruments, including chimes, bells, gongs, mbiras, a musical saw, shakers, rattles, found objects, and miscellaneous drums. Muir initially appeared on a single King Crimson album, 1973's Larks' Tongues in Aspic (the title of which was coined by Muir; when asked by Fripp what the music sounded like, Muir responded "why, larks' tongues in aspic ... what else?"), on which he is listed as playing "Percussion and Allsorts". Several live recordings featuring Muir were released later by DGM records; the 15-disc box set released in 2012 for the 40th anniversary of the album includes every recording from that line-up, both live or studio, documenting everything Muir has ever contributed.

According to John Kelman, Muir "brought not just a visual 'X factor' to the group but a musical one as well, his not-to-be understated contributions during his brief tenure with Crimson still felt well after his departure, with the percussionist exerting a lasting influence on (drummer Bill) Bruford". Bruford called Muir "my biggest influence and the guy who turned my head totally around ... God, did he open my eyes. Jamie saw above and beyond chops. He was into the color of the music, the tone, and being intuitive about it." Bruford also wrote that Muir taught him to "try to see life from the far side of the cymbals: drummers can be very myopic. He also pointed out – and I consider this my first and best drum lesson – that I exist to serve the music, the music does not exist to serve me." Regarding his relationship with Robert Fripp, Muir wrote "Fripp was open and believed very much in getting disparate musical elements together ... he seemed to me to be a very good band leader. I think I was a wee bit too much for him, simply because I was so involved in improvisation. He was very much concerned with logic and function, he always worked his solos out before playing them ... For a person like him it was a very admirable creative decision to actually work with somebody like me." Muir also recalled: "I always remember I had an urge to get Robert to let his hair down because he was very controlled in the way he played ... I really tried and tried to provoke him." In summing up his experience with the band, Muir stated "King Crimson was the ideal for me ... I was extremely pleased and I felt completely at home with the Crimson."

In early March 1973, Muir attended Bruford's wedding reception, and had a long conversation with Yes's singer Jon Anderson during which he strongly recommended that Anderson read Paramahansa Yogananda's Autobiography of a Yogi. Anderson recalled: "He was an unbelievable stage performer ... I wanted to know what made him do that, what had influenced him. He said to me, 'Here, read it,' and it started me off on the path of becoming aware that there was even a path ... Jamie was like a messenger for me and came to me at the perfect time in my life ... he changed my life." Anderson's fascination with the book soon led to the creation of the Yes album Tales From Topographic Oceans.

A little over a week after the release of Larks' Tongues, Muir abruptly left King Crimson. The British press at the time cited his departure as the result of "personal injury sustained onstage during performance", a phrase attributed to the band's management company, E.G. Records. Muir himself stated "[t]hat was nonsense about my having injured myself ... When I heard about what they'd said, I wondered why would anybody do that – what advantage could there be in not saying what actually happened?" He also stated: "There were experiences over a period of about six months which caused me to decide to give up music, so one morning I felt I had to go to E.G. management and tell them. It was difficult of course, a whole year of tours had just been lined up ... I didn't feel too happy about letting people down, but this was something I had to do or else it would have been a source of deep regret for the rest of my life."

=== Post-King Crimson ===
Muir left King Crimson and moved to Samye Ling Monastery near Eskdalemuir in southern Scotland in order to pursue a monastic lifestyle in accordance with the strict principles of Buddhism.

In 1980, Muir returned to the London music scene, recording with Bailey (Dart Drug), Parker (The Ayes Have It), and Company (Trios, Company 1981, and Company 1983). He also appeared on the soundtrack of the film Ghost Dance, a collaboration with another Crimson alumnus, drummer Michael Giles and David Cunningham recorded in 1983, and eventually released in 1996. Muir reported that he withdrew from the music business around 1990, to devote his energies to painting.

Muir died in Cornwall, England, on 17 February 2025, at the age of 79.

== Ideas about music ==
Muir stated: "I think group improvised music is one of the great forms of 20th Century music because it's so radical. It should be listened to live and not in an acute intellectual way. A lot of other music is quite absurdly intellectual." Regarding his approach to percussion, he said: "I much prefer junk shops to antique shops. There's nothing to find in an antique shop – it's all been found already; whereas in a junk shop it's only been collected. But a rubbish dump – a rubbish dump has been neither found nor collected – in fact it's been completed rejected – the future if only you can see it." He recommended that "[i]nstead of transmuting rubbish into music with a heavily predetermined qualitative bias ... leave behind the biases and structures of selectivity (which is an enormous task), the 'found' attitudes you inherit, and approach the rubbish with a total respect for its nature as rubbish – the undiscovered/unidentified/unclaimed – transmuting that nature into the performing dimension. The way to discover the undiscovered in performing terms is to immediately reject all situations as you identify them (the cloud of unknowing) – which is to give music a future."

== Discography ==
With the Music Improvisation Company (Derek Bailey, Evan Parker and Hugh Davies)

- The Music Improvisation Company (ECM, 1970) with Christine Jeffrey on two tracks.
- The Music Improvisation Company 1968–1971 (Incus, 1968–70 [1976])

With King Crimson

- Larks' Tongues in Aspic (Island, 1973)
- Larks' Tongues in Aspic (box set) (DGM, 2012)

With Derek Bailey

- Dart Drug (Incus, 1981; reissued on CD in 1994)

With Evan Parker and Paul Rogers

- The Ayes Have It (Emanem, 1983, 2001)

With Richard Strange and The Engine Room

- Going Gone (Percussion, 1984)

With Michael Giles and David Cunningham

- Ghost Dance (Piano, 1996)

With the Company

- Trios (Incus, 1986)
- Company 1981 (Honest Jon's, 2019)
- Company 1983 (Honest Jon's, 2020)

With Laurie Scott Baker

- Gracility (Musicnow, 2009)
