= Omnivm =

Live album by FURT (Richard Barrett and Paul Obermayer)
- Released: 2006
- Recorded: March 9, 2005; April 25, 2006
- Venue: St Oswald's Church, Durham, England; Sonic Arts Research Centre, Belfast
- Genre: Free improvisation, electronic, noise, glitch
- Length: 1:17:47
- Label: Psi; 06.09

FURT chronology
Dead or Alive (2004)	Omnivm (2006)	Spin Networks (2007)

Omnivm is a live album by the electronic music duo FURT, consisting of Richard Barrett and Paul Obermayer. Tracks 2 and 3 were recorded on March 9, 2005, at St Oswald's Church, Durham, England, while tracks 1 and 4 were recorded on April 25, 2006, at the Sonic Arts Research Centre in Belfast. The album is dedicated to composer Iannis Xenakis, and was released in 2006 by Psi Records.

The music is based on the manipulation of samples from four sound sources: gamelan music, distorted voices, sounds produced by an analog synthesizer, and a free improvisation trio featuring saxophonist Evan Parker, double bassist Barry Guy, and percussionist Paul Lytton. The album title was derived from the novel The Third Policeman by Flann O'Brien, in which "omnium" is "the essential inherent interior essence which is hidden in the root of the kernel of everything."

== Reception ==
Professional ratings
Review scores
Source	Rating
AllMusic	4/5 stars
The Penguin Guide to Jazz	4/4 stars

In a review for AllMusic, François Couture called the album "a truly stunning performance," and wrote: "The performance is continuous and the shift is gradual from one main sound source to the next, with previous and future centers of interest always remaining in the picture. This architecture brings thematic unity to the 78-minute piece, which in turn makes the uninterrupted stream of sonic information somewhat easier to digest... Recommended."

The authors of The Penguin Guide to Jazz Recordings awarded the album a full four stars, describing it as "a magnificent achievement and... an essential documentation in improvised music," and noting that the sampled sounds are "so 'organically' and coherently blended that source materials quickly seem irrelevant."

Paris Transatlantic's Dan Warburton commented: "If you're the kind of hyperactive jitterbug who finds Stockhausen's Kontakte, Farmers Manual and Pateras / Fox too torpid, you'll love it. There are probably literally millions of pings, splats, fizzes and gurgles on offer, and they're impressive and exhilarating to listen to. Whether it all adds up to the essential inherent interior essence which is hidden in the root of the kernel of everything is for you to decide, but there's certainly plenty of everything in there."

Nilan Perera of Exclaim! remarked: "Is it noise, glitch, electro-acoustic? It is none of the above and all. While remaining fully aware of all these isms, Barrett and Obermeyer have created a situation that transcends these limitations by redefining the definitions that often place improv and composition at odds with one another. All this and making some fun, smart music in the bargain."

== Track listing ==
1. "ever" – 19:05
2. "obliged" – 15:52
3. "yet" – 17:33
4. "us" – 25:17

== Personnel ==
- Richard Barrett – electronics
- Paul Obermayer – electronics
