= As the Wind =

Live album by Evan Parker
- Released: 2016
- Recorded: September 22, 2012
- Venues: St Peters, Whitstable, England
- Genre: Free improvisation
- Labels: Psi; 16.01
- Producers: Evan Parker, Martin Davidson

Evan Parker chronology
Making Rooms (2016)	As the Wind (2016)	On Growth and Form (2016)

As the Wind is a live album by saxophonist Evan Parker on which he is joined by percussionists Toma Gouband, playing lithophones, and Mark Nauseef, playing metallophones. It was recorded on September 22, 2012, at St Peters in Whitstable, England, and was issued on CD in 2016 by Psi Records as the label's final release.

Parker declared that the disc was "one of the best records I have ever made."

== Reception ==
Professional ratings
Review scores
Source	Rating
All About Jazz	5/5 stars
The Irish Times	5/5 stars
Jazzwise	4/5 stars

The editors of The Irish Times ranked the album as the year's best jazz release, awarding it a full five stars. Reviewer Cormac Larkin wrote: "The results are so fresh, and ear-craningly delicate that even those who don't think they enjoy this level of abstraction may be forced to re-evaluate."

In a review for Jazzwise, Philip Clark stated: "this record doesn't contain a single note of jazz, but is a remarkably fine document... I get why Parker rates this record so highly – and hearing him building lines on soprano, rather than defaulting to too much circular breathing, is refreshing."

The editors of All About Jazz also awarded the album a full five stars, and writer John Eyles commented: "The music supports Parker's judgment that it is one of his best... Lacking the pyrotechnics of some of his recordings, such as his solo circular-breathing marathons, As the Wind is a slow-burner that ends up being just as impressive in different ways."

Derek Taylor of Dusted Magazine included the album in his year-end "best of" list, and remarked: "The end collective effect often takes on the unexpected superficial semblance to traditional Japanese theater music in its meditative symmetry and controlled dissonances... this is certainly an achievement that stands out in singular and fascinating form."

JazzWord's Ken Waxman described the music as "brimming with unexpected timbres and interactions... inventions of understatement." He noted: "Parker's distinctive saxophone cascades... not only set the session's mood, but as soon as idiophone smacks clip-clop out their messages, he's able to mimic them. With the selections unfolding in real time, very soon a rapprochement is made between the saxophonist's alp-horn-like swells and rhythmic reverberations which resemble the clatter of mah-jong tiles. Nauseef... makes bell-tree shakes and prayer bowl rubs fit the tunes without fissure, moving alongside Gouband's individualistic strategy of slapping stones on drum tops."

Writer Raul Da Gama stated: "Texture is everything: there are no silences; only long slurs and echoes after which the music seems to be punctuated by a series of crescendos... there is always a sense of sculpted sound but the combination of instrumental timbres is often radiantly beautiful, suggesting bejewelled and absolutely aglow."

Two of the writers at The New York City Jazz Record included the album in their list of recommended new releases, and it was also included in the magazine's "Best of 2016" feature.

Writing for the Downtown Music Gallery, Bruce Lee Gallanter called the album a "treasure chest of gems," and commented: "The results are extraordinary... The sound here is very organic, almost ritualistic in the way the stones are so cautiously played. The music is often minimal with no one member soloing or leading. Things take time to unfold and advance at their own pace. Is that a sax or rubbed stones or both or neither?!?"

The Free Jazz Collective's Stuart Broomer included the album in his list of the year's notable recordings, describing it as "superb music... a soundworld at once abstract and intimate, with every sound spontaneously presenting itself with acute detail and a sense of inevitability."

== Track listing ==
1. "As the Wind" – 13:36
2. "Seeking the Bubble Reputation" – 6:59
3. "Like a Wild-goose Flies" – 4:42
4. "Make Noise Enough" – 11:53
5. "Ambitious for a Motley Coat" – 10:38
6. "As a Weasel Sucks Eggs" – 1:21
7. "Come Warble, Come" – 1:21
8. "Pipes and Whistles in His Sound" – 3:52
9. "Sane Everything" – 6:41

== Personnel ==
- Evan Parker – soprano saxophone
- Toma Gouband – percussion (lithophones)
- Mark Nauseef – percussion (metallophones)
