= Sense (FURT album) =

Live album by FURT (Richard Barrett and Paul Obermayer)
- Released: 2009
- Recorded: August 2, 2008; January 16, 2009
- Venue: Lewis Glucksman Gallery, University College Cork, Ireland
- Genre: Free improvisation, electronic, noise, glitch
- Label: Psi; 09.08
- Producer: Evan Parker, Martin Davidson

FURT chronology
Equals (2008)	Sense (2009)	Spukhafte Fernwirkung (2014)

Sense is an album by the electronic music duo FURT, consisting of Richard Barrett and Paul Obermayer. It features two long tracks: "Uranus," a studio recording from August 2, 2008, with twelve parts titled "Limen" I–XII; and "Curtains," a live recording from January 16, 2009, dedicated to Karlheinz Stockhausen, documenting a performance at the Lewis Glucksman Gallery at University College Cork, Ireland. The album was released in 2009 by Psi Records.

== Reception ==
Professional ratings
Review scores
Source	Rating
All About Jazz	4/5 stars

In a review for Musicworks, Ken Waxman wrote: "Both pieces undeniably impress, in part because of the near extrasensory connection that Barrett and Obermayer have developed by playing together since 1986... Having time, energy, and liberty, FURT expands the number of paths open to committed electroacoustic experimenters."

John Eyles of All About Jazz called the album "a worthy addition to Furt's steadily growing discography," and stated: "For two people, Furt produce a soundscape that is surprisingly full, busy and rapidly changing... The overall effect is like watching a rotating kaleidoscope; there is too much to assimilate and no second chances. Ultimately, immersion, surrender and enjoyment are the only realistic options."

Point of Departure's Kevin Patton commented: "The 20 year history and power of FURT is in full effect on... Sense... This recording cannot be easily broken into its constituent parts, Sense only makes sense listened to in its entirety. Things are moving so quick as to twist around a beautifully created silence in a matter of milliseconds."

Writing for The Jazz Mann, Tim Owen remarked: "Furt's electronics are simultaneously playful in an almost childlike sense and mind-fuckingly cerebral. These characteristics are dualities of both of the long pieces that make up Sense, but each piece tugs in an opposite direction... At times I've found Sense utterly engrossing and immensely enjoyable, but on other occasions it's just threatened me with a headache. You must listen for yourselves."

== Track listing ==
1. "Uranus" – 46:23
2. "Curtains" – 25:46

== Personnel ==
- Richard Barrett – electronics
- Paul Obermayer – electronics
