= Defekt (album) =

Studio album by FURT (Richard Barrett and Paul Obermayer)
- Released: 2002
- Recorded: 1997–2001
- Studio: various
- Genre: Free improvisation, electronic, noise, glitch
- Length: 1:15:28
- Label: Matchless Recordings; MRCD50

FURT chronology
Angel (1999)	Defekt (2002)	Dead or Alive (2004)

Defekt is an album by the electronic music duo FURT, consisting of Richard Barrett and Paul Obermayer. It features four tracks: "Plint," a studio piece recorded in Berlin during December 2001, dedicated to Konrad Boehmer; "Gute Nacht," recorded at the studio of Walter Fabeck in Watford, England, during October 1997, and based on Schubert's Winterreise, with vocals by Ute Wassermann; "Volksmusik," produced in Amsterdam for a performance in Klosterneuburg, Austria, for the Wien Modern festival held during November 2000, and using the voice of Charlie Chaplin; and "Ultimatum," a studio recording created in Amsterdam during February 2000, dedicated to Karlheinz Stockhausen. The album was released in 2002 by Matchless Recordings.

== Reception ==
Professional ratings
Review scores
Source	Rating
AllMusic	3/5 stars
The Penguin Guide to Jazz	3/4 stars

In a review for AllMusic, Brian Olewnick described the music as "straddling the boundaries of the contemporary electro-acoustic scene and free improvisation," and called the album "a solid enough effort" while noting that "some listeners may prefer the original inspirational sources."

The authors of The Penguin Guide to Jazz Recordings singled out "Ultimatum" for praise, writing: "it's the most effective integration of electronic sound with a free-flowing, real-time improvisatory practice. And at 45 minutes it's a powerful statement."

The BBC's Hannah Skrinar called the album "a varied disc which stands repeated listening; a strangely therapeutic and superb musical experience."

Julian Cowley of The Wire described the music as "remote from frivolity," and stated: "Electronics are used neither as diversion nor effect but to soberly treat and transform sound materials, to voice solidarity with ghosts of the restless and disappointed."

In an article for Computer Music Journal, James Harley commented: "The variety of material, and the variation of mood, texture, dynamics, density, and allusion, all speak to FURT's mastery of the genre and the duo's highly fertile imagination There is humor here, and reflection, too, and homage as well as pointed political satire... This is music that requires concentrated listening; this is not a group one would find people dancing to at a club (although I wouldn't want to discourage anyone from trying!"

== Track listing ==
1. "Plint" – 10:04
2. "Gute Nacht" – 4:56
3. "Volksmusik" – 15:28
4. "Ultimatum" – 45:00

== Personnel ==
- Richard Barrett – electronics
- Paul Obermayer – electronics
