= Richard Barrett (composer) =

Welsh composer (born 1959)

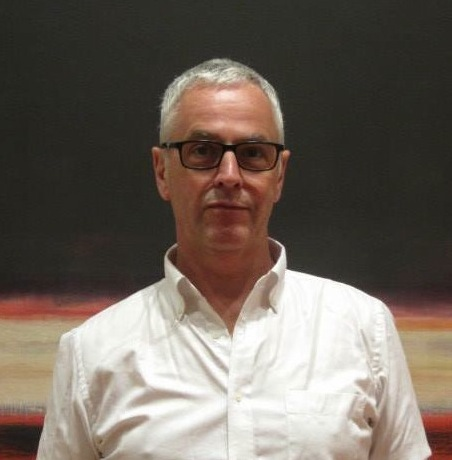
Barrett in June 2015

Richard Barrett (born 7 November 1959) is a Welsh composer.

== Biography ==
Barrett was born in Swansea, Wales and attended Olchfa School. After completing his first bachelor's degree in genetics and microbiology from University College London in 1980, he began to study music, taking private lessons with Peter Wiegold, and soon thereafter participating in the 1984 Internationale Ferienkurse für Neue Musik where there were fruitful encounters with Brian Ferneyhough and Hans-Joachim Hespos. In the late 1980s he became associated with the so-called New Complexity group of British composers because of the intricate notation of his scores. He is equally active in free improvisation, most often in the electronic duo FURT with Paul Obermayer, formed in 1986, but also since 2003 as a member of the Evan Parker Electro-Acoustic Ensemble. Since 1990 about half of his compositions have been written for the ELISION Ensemble, most notably the extended works Opening of the Mouth, DARK MATTER, CONSTRUCTION and world-line. Most of his compositions since the 1990s have involved both acoustic and electronic resources, combined in many different ways. In 2005 he and Obermayer formed the electroacoustic octet fORCH.

He taught composition at Middlesex University from 1989 to 1992, and electronic composition at the Institute of Sonology of the Hague Royal Conservatory in 1996, where he worked until 2001. In 2009 he resumed teaching regularly at the institute, and is also Professor of Creative Music Research at Leiden University. Having moved from London to Amsterdam in 1993, he lived in Berlin from 2001 to 2013, initially as a guest of the German Academic Exchange Service's (DAAD) "Berliner Künstlerprogramm", except between 2006 and 2009 when he was a professor of composition at Brunel University London. Barrett has often been politically outspoken, and in 1990 joined the Socialist Workers Party. While no longer an active member he remains aligned with revolutionary socialism.

Barrett won the Kranichsteiner Musikpreis at the Internationale Ferienkurse für Neue Musik, Darmstadt, in 1986, and was awarded the Gaudeamus Prize in 1989. He also won the Chamber Music category of the 2003 British Composer Awards.

Many of Barrett's works are grouped into series, and have extra-musical associations—particularly with the writers Samuel Beckett and Paul Celan, but also the Chilean painter Roberto Matta, and ideas from physics, mythology, astrology and philosophy (in the texts of DARK MATTER). Barrett's compositional techniques, which derive equally and indistinguishably from serial, stochastic and intuitive methods, have since the mid-1980s made extensive use of computer programs he has developed himself. He regards free improvisation as a method of composition rather than as a different or opposed kind of musical activity.

His codex series of compositions explores diverse ways of using composed frameworks as a point of departure for improvisation, particularly with larger groups, while the fOKT series extrapolates some of FURT's characteristic forms of texture and co-ordination into the octet context of the fORCH ensemble. The results of these more experimental and collaborative projects have exerted an increasing influence on Barrett's other compositional work, which remains mostly fully notated, although several compositions (for example transmission, Blattwerk and adrift) alternate between precise scoring and free improvisation for part or all of their duration. However, these different strategies are used to maximise the musical potential of the whole, rather than drawing attention to the distinction between improvisational and notational methods of composition—as Barrett himself puts it: "As a listener I generally prefer to concentrate on what music is doing rather than how it was done".

Since 2003 he has been working on an eight-part cycle of compositions collectively entitled resistance & vision and with a projected total duration of over six hours, of which the first (NO), third (cell), fifth (Mesopotamia), sixth (IF), seventh (nacht und träume) and eighth (CONSTRUCTION) have so far been completed (July 2016). CONSTRUCTION is itself a conglomerate work lasting over two hours in performance, consisting of 20 components in four interwoven cycles which may also be performed singly or in various combinations. Since the completion of CONSTRUCTION he has completed a number of other projects which continue long-term associations—life-form for cellist Arne Deforce and world-line for ELISION—as well as inaugurating new ones—close-up for the Belgrade-based group Ensemble Studio6 and two three-hour works in progress natural causes (based on a cycle of poems written for him by Simon Howard) for various ensembles including Musikfabrik, soundinitiative, Ensemble du Bout du Monde and Fonema Consort, and PSYCHE for ELISION.

He is currently based in The Hague, Netherlands. In 2019 his book Music of Possibility was published by Vision Edition, followed in 2023 by Transforming Moments from the same publisher.

He is not related to Syd Barrett.

== Selected works ==
- Ne songe plus à fuir (1985–86) for solo cello
- EARTH (1987–88) for trombone and percussion
- I open and close (1983–88) for string quartet
- negatives (1988–93) for 9 players
- Vanity (1991–94) for orchestra
- CHARON (1994–95) for bass clarinet
- Tract (1984–96) for solo piano
- Opening of the Mouth (1992–97) for two vocalists, 9 instrumentalists and electronics
- transmission (1996–99) for electric guitar and electronics
- Blattwerk (1998–2002) for cello and electronics
- DARK MATTER (1990–2003) for voices, ensemble and electronics
- NO (1999–2004) for orchestra
- Flechtwerk (2002–06) for clarinet and piano
- adrift (2003–07) for piano and electronics
- Nacht und Träume (2004–08) for cello, piano and electronics
- Mesopotamia (2006–09) for 17 instruments and electronics
- codex I – ... (2000– ) for improvising ensembles
- IF (2006–10) for orchestra
- cell (2005–11) for alto saxophone, accordion and contrabass
- CONSTRUCTION (2005–11) for voices, instruments and electronics
- vale (2005–12) for solo flute
- fold (2011–12) for solo Redgate-Howarth system oboe, also (2016) for soprano saxophone
- life-form (2011–12) for cello and electronics
- EQUALE (2013) 8-channel electronic music composed in collaboration with Kees Tazelaar
- urlicht (2013–14) for three percussionists
- world-line (2012–14) for flugelhorn/piccolo trumpet, percussion, electric lap steel guitar and electronics
- eiszeiten (2012–14) for horn, trombone, tuba and electronics
- wake (2014–15) for three instrumental trios and electronics
- codex XV (2015) for three groups of improvising musicians and conductor
- close-up (2013–16) for six performers and electronics
- everything has changed/nothing has changed (2013–17) for orchestra
- natural causes act 3 (2015–17) for 16 musicians and electronics
- tkiva (2016–17) for 4 instruments and electronics
- Vermilion Sands (2017–18) electronic music
- entoptic (2017–18) for percussion and electronics
- membrane (2017–19) for trombone and electronics
- pektis (2015–17) for vocalising harpist
- natural causes act 2 (2015–23) for 8 performers and electronics
- artefact (2018–24) electronic music
- distant music ominously nearing (2023–24) for flute and ensemble
- sorcerer (2023–24) for pedal steel guitar
- absences (2022–24) for violin and percussion
- someone (2025) for saxophone quartet

== Selected discography ==
- Chamber Works. ELISION Ensemble conducted by Sandro Gorli (Etcetera 1993)—contains Ne songe plus à fuir, EARTH, Another heavenly day and negatives
- FURT: Live in Amsterdam 1994 (X-OR 1995)
- Vanity. BBC Symphony Orchestra conducted by Arturo Tamayo (NMC 1996)
- FURT: angel (JdK 1999)
- Opening of the Mouth. ELISION Ensemble conducted by Simon Hewett (ABC Classics 1999, reissued 2009)
- FURT: defekt (Matchless 2002)
- FURT: dead or alive (Psi 2004)
- FURT: OMNIVM (Psi 2006)
- transmission (NMC 2007). ELISION soloists—contains interference, abglanzbeladen/auseinandergeschrieben, basalt, air, knospend-gespaltener and transmission
- fORCH: spin networks (Psi 2007)
- Ute Wassermann and Richard Barrett: pollen (Creative Sources 2008)
- FURT plus: equals (Psi 2008)
- Negatives. ELISION Ensemble conducted by Sandro Gorli (NMC 2009) – reissue of Chamber Works with the addition of codex I
- FURT: sense (Psi 2009)
- Adrift—3 compositions 2007/8 (Psi 2009). RB with Sarah Nicolls, ELISION, Champ d'Action—contains adrift, codex VII and codex IX
- Richard Barrett and Han-earl Park (guitar): numbers (Creative Sources 2012)
- DARK MATTER (NMC 2012). ELISION and Cikada ensembles conducted by Christian Eggen
- Richard Barrett, Jon Rose (violin/tenor violin), Meinrad Kneer (contrabass): colophony (Creative Sources 2013)
- SKEIN – RB with Frank Gratkowski, Achim Kaufmann, Wilbert de Joode, Okkyung Lee and Tony Buck (Leo Records 2014)
- fORCH: "spukhafte Fernwirkung" (Treader 2015)
- "Music for cello and electronics" (double CD, Aeon 2016). Arne Deforce (cello) and Yutaka Oya (piano)
- close-up (Sargasso 2025) Ensemble Studio 6

With Evan Parker's Electro-Acoustic Ensemble

- The Eleventh Hour (ECM 2004)
- The Moment's Energy (ECM 2007)
- SET (Psi 2009)
- Hasselt (Psi 2012)
