= Angel and Crown, Covent Garden =

Pub in Covent Garden, London

Coordinates: 51.510936°N 0.126859°W

Mr. Fogg's Tavern
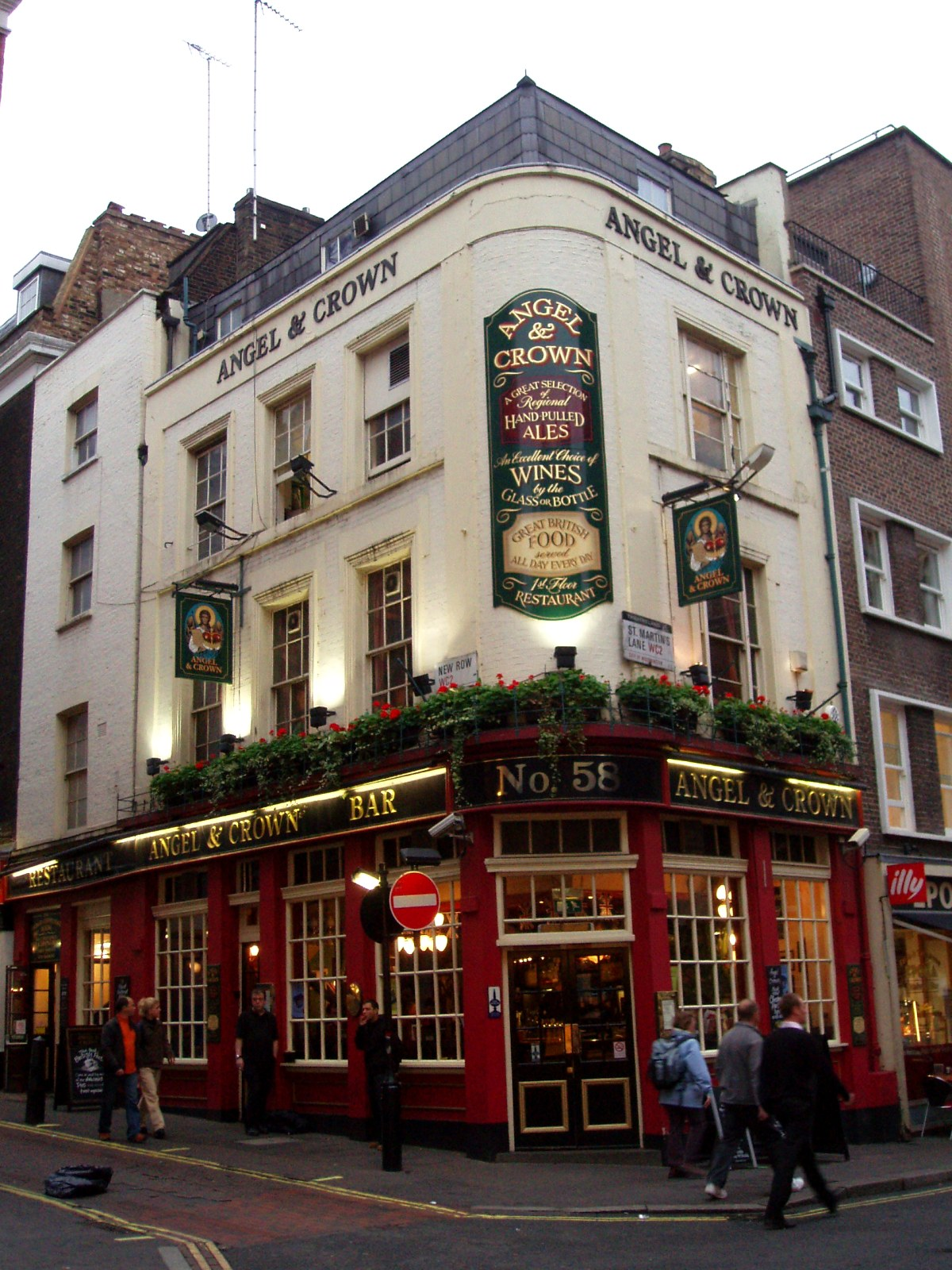
- Mr. Fogg's Tavern (as Angel and Crown)
- Interactive map of Mr. Fogg's Tavern
- Type: Public house
- Location: 58 St Martin's Lane, Covent Garden, London, WC2

Listed Building – Grade II
- Official name: MR FOGG'S TAVERN
- Designated: 15-Jan-1973
- Reference no.: 1236047

Mr. Fogg's Tavern (formerly Angel and Crown) is a Grade II listed public house at 58 St Martin's Lane, Covent Garden, London, WC2.

It was built in the late 18th or early 19th century.
