= Gene Calderazzo =

American jazz drummer

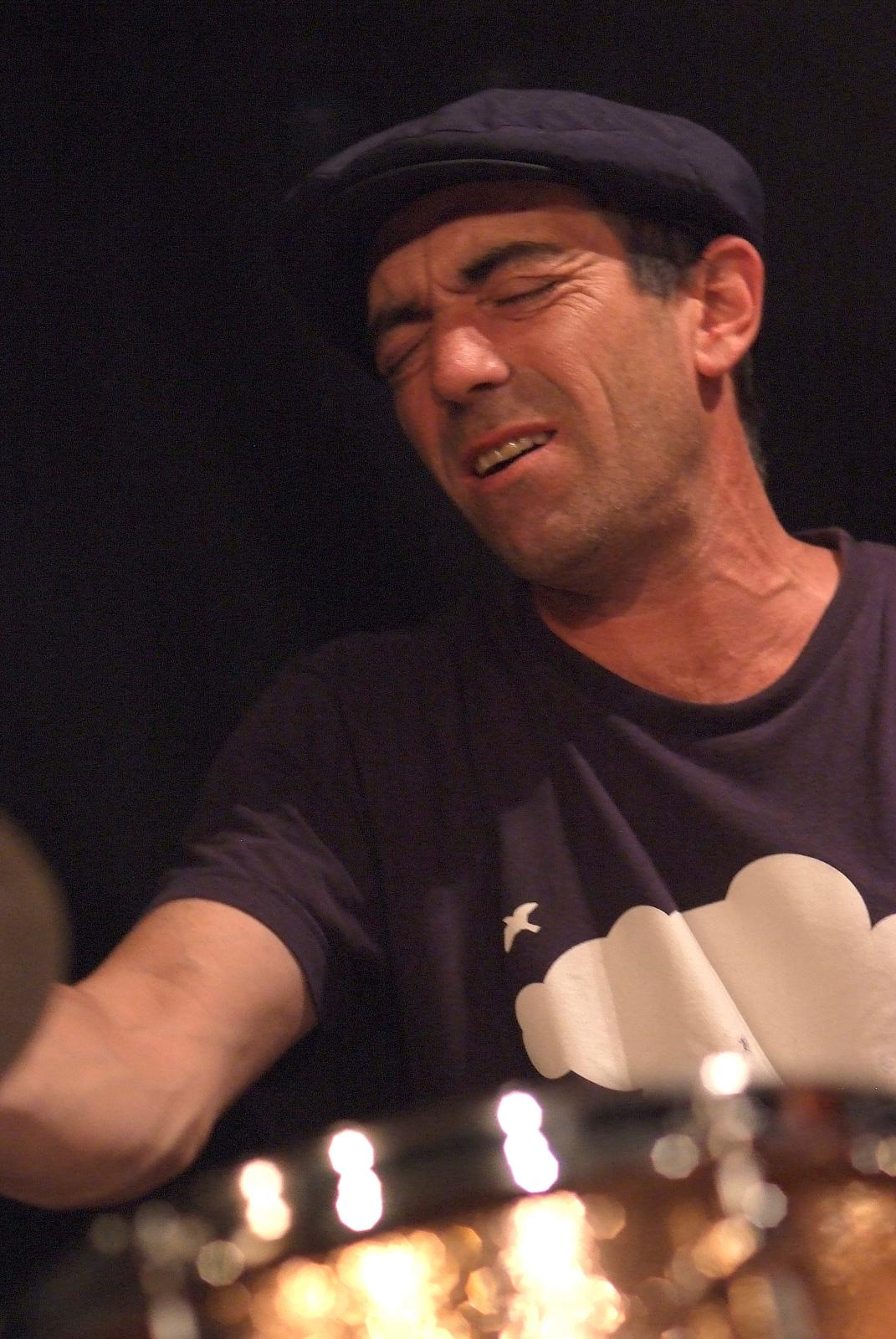
- Calderazzo performing in 2008.

Background information
- Born: 23 April 1961 (age 65); New York City, United States
- Origin: England
- Genres: Jazz
- Occupation: Musician
- Instrument: Drums
- Member of: Partisans

Gene Calderazzo (born 23 April 1961 in New York City) is an American jazz drummer residing in the United Kingdom, where he is a visiting tutor at the Birmingham Conservatoire, the Royal Academy of Music, Trinity and the Guildhall. He also drums for the jazz quartet, Partisans, with Julien Siegel (saxophones), Phil Robson (guitar), and Thad Kelly (bass).

He is a long-term member of a quartet that contains Julian Siegel, pianist Liam Noble, and bassist Oli Hayhurst. Their first album, Urban Theme Park (2011) was followed by Vista in 2018.
