= Dart Drug (album) =

Studio album by Derek Bailey and Jamie Muir
- Released: 1981
- Recorded: August 1981
- Studio: Crane Grove Studios, London
- Genre: Free improvisation
- Label: Incus
- Producer: Derek Bailey

Dart Drug is an album by improvising musicians Derek Bailey and Jamie Muir, recorded at Crane Grove, London, in August 1981. It was produced by Derek Bailey and released on LP by Incus Records in 1981. It was reissued on CD by Incus in 1994, and by Honest Jon's in 2018.

Writer Ben Watson described his first impressions of the disc: "The CD arrived wrapped in images of glass-curtain buildings, photographs by Jamie, sporting bizarre wobbles caused by imperfections in the glass. He also drew the album's title, a bizarre scrawl like some mescalin-induced vision notated by Henri Michaux."

== Reception ==
Professional ratings
Review scores
| Source | Rating |
|---|---|
| All About Jazz | 4/5 stars |
| AllMusic | 3/5 stars |
| The Penguin Guide to Jazz | 4/4 stars |

A 1995 review of the 1994 CD reissue in Hi-Fi News & Record Review stated: "Elegant, airy interchanges between the master of the f-hole (Bailey) and a maverick percussionist (Muir). Muir provides a ceaseless array of new timbres, opening up delicate spaces between distant rumbles and in-yer-face pops and clicks. He boils up noisy squalls out of which Bailey's notes sail like slo-mo silver bullets. Derek Bailey is truly the guitarist's guitarist. Although recorded way back in 1981, this is so far ahead of what most deem possible on the guitar that it's ridiculous. And sublime, simultaneously at the same time."

In a review for AllMusic, Thom Jurek wrote: "This date with guitarist Derek Bailey is in many ways quite remarkable. In these four improvisations, Bailey himself attempts to become a nearly lyrical player, sensitively looking for timbral elements within his already sonant tones, and Muir moves to underline that aspect of his playing. This is not to say that dynamics and violence are not found here – quite the contrary, they're just more closely observed. The title track, clocking in just shy of half an hour, is for practical matters the hinge piece of the album, though it comes last in sequence. From random plinks and plonks, where Bailey accompanies Muir as a percussionist in the way he uses his strings and Muir dances all over the mix, a kind of pattern develops where dynamic threads are woven and carried forth into others, always leaving the fully articulated one as the process begets the creation of another. This systematic approach is different for both men, and results in a kind of ideational clarity that lesser players would love to emulate. The result is as open as silence itself, albeit a more playful gazer into its open mouth by this pair of yobs who are winking and laughing."

Writing for All About Jazz, Chris May commented: "The bracing yet strangely beautiful album is one of the few recordings made by the percussionist Jamie Muir after he retired from professional music-making in 1973, first to study Buddhism in Scottish and French monasteries, then to become a fulltime painter... On Dart Drug, the soundscapes—to call some of them 'music' would imply a degree of sonic conventionality which is mostly absent—are shaped more by Muir's whirlwind energy and idiosyncratic array of percussion than they are by Bailey's guitar. Some of Muir's instruments are identifiable, others are anybody's guess. Hub-caps floating in jello and struck by tyre irons? Empty barrels suspended in mid-air and shot at with BB guns? We may never know... maybe Dart Drug can meaningfully be described as music—just not as we know it, Jim. Whatever you call it, listening to it is a novel out-of-body experience."

== Track listing ==
All compositions by Derek Bailey and Jamie Muir. The timing changes from Incus 1994 CD edition (Incus CD19) to Honest Jon's 2018 CD edition.

Incus:

1. "Carminative" – 8:48
2. "I Soon Learned To Know This Flower Better" – 7:14
3. "Jara" – 7:49
4. "Dart Drug" – 25:50

Honest Jon's:

1. "Carminative" – 11:30
2. "I Soon Learned To Know This Flower Better" – 7:15
3. "Jara" – 7:30
4. "Dart Drug" – 25:30

== Personnel ==
- Derek Bailey – guitar
- Jamie Muir – percussion
