= Hugh Davies (composer) =

English musicologist (1943–2005)

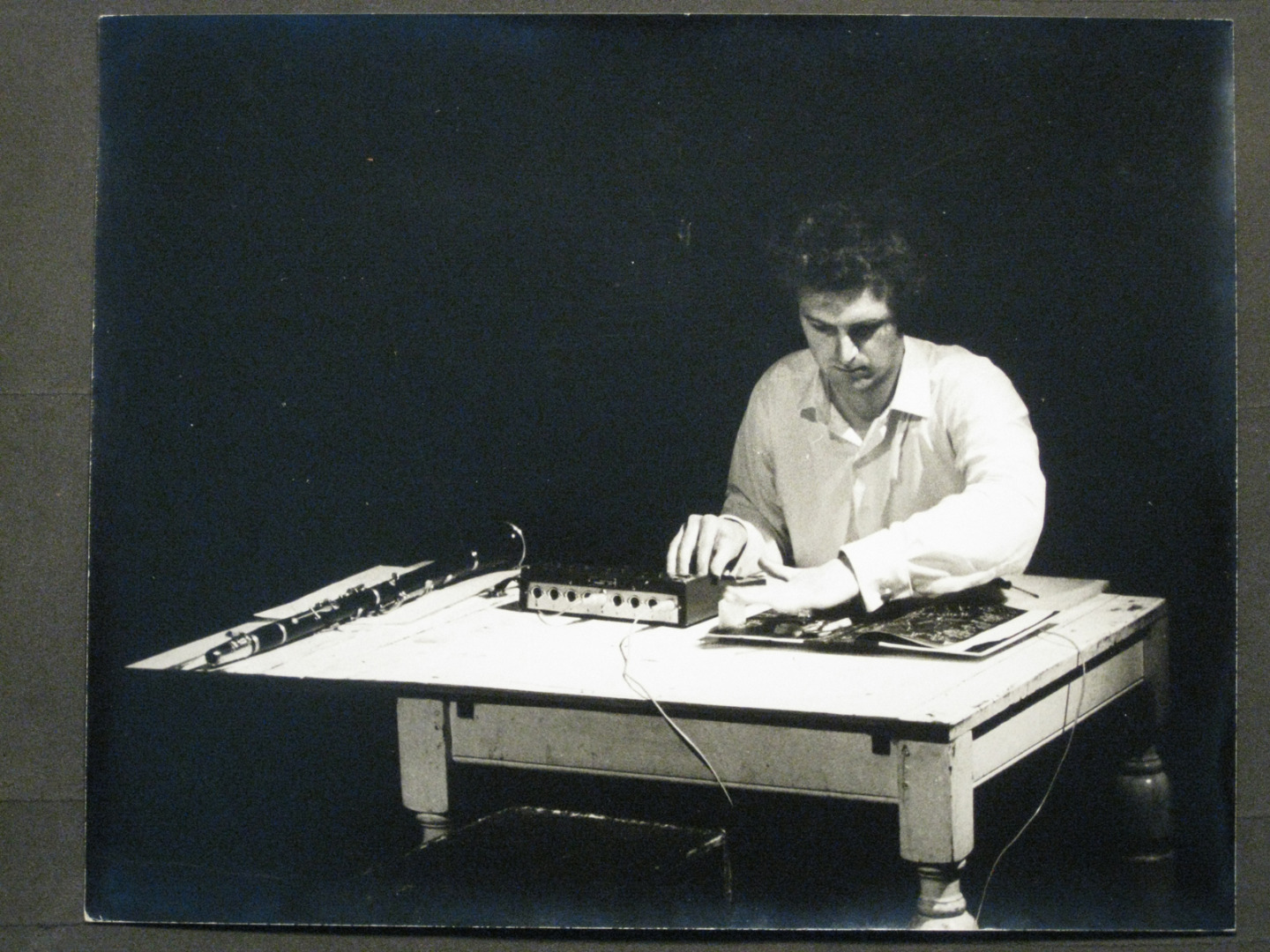
- Davies with Shozyg I Uher mixer and clarinet
- Born: 23 April 1943; Exmouth, Devon, England
- Died: 1 January 2005 (aged 61)
- Education: Westminster School; Worcester College; Oxford
- Occupations: Musicologist, composer and inventor of musical instruments

Hugh Seymour Davies (23 April 1943 – 1 January 2005) was an English musicologist, composer, and inventor of experimental musical instruments.

== History ==
Davies was born in Exmouth, Devon, England. After attending Westminster School, he studied music at Worcester College, Oxford from 1961 to 1964. Shortly after he travelled to Cologne, Germany, to work for Karlheinz Stockhausen as his personal assistant. For two years, he assembled and documented material for Stockhausen's compositions and was a member of his live ensemble.

From 1968 to 1971, Davies played in The Music Improvisation Company. The group's guitarist Derek Bailey later wrote that "the live electronics served to extend the music both forwards and backwards (...) Davies helped to loosen what had been, until his arrival, a perhaps too rarified approach". He was also a member of the group Gentle Fire, active from 1968 to 1975, which specialised in the realisation of indeterminate and mobile scores, as well as verbally formulated intuitive-music compositions (such as Stockhausen's Aus den sieben Tagen) and in the performance of its own Group Compositions.

Davies invented musical instruments that he constructed from household items. Among them was the shozyg, a generic name he used for any instrument housed inside an unusual container. The name is derived from the first of such instruments, which was housed inside the final volume of an encyclopaedia (covering the subjects from SHO– to ZYG–).

From the 1960s onwards, Davies made very significant contributions to the documentation of electronic music history, and in 1968 published a catalogue in which he listed - ostensibly - all the works of electronic music ever composed worldwide. It has been argued that, through his research and documentation, Davies characterised electronic music for the first time as a truly international, interdisciplinary field.

Davies was also a member of the Artist Placement Group during the mid-1970s.

Davies was the founder and first Director of the Electronic Music Studios at Goldsmiths, University of London, from 1968 to 1986 and was subsequently a researcher there until 1991.

Davies appeared on the 1988 album Spirit Of Eden by UK group Talk Talk.

Davies had been a part-time researcher and lecturer in Sonic Art at the Centre for Electronic Arts, Middlesex University, London, from 1999 until the end of his life.

== Discography ==
=== As leader ===
- Shozyg Music For Invented Instruments (FMP, 1982)
- Interplay (FMP, 1997)
- Warming Up with the Iceman (Grob, 2001)
- Sounds Heard (FMP, 2002)
- Tapestries (Five Electronic Pieces) (Ants, 2005)
- Performances 1969 - 1977 (Another Timbre, 2008)

=== With the Music Improvisation Company (Derek Bailey, Evan Parker and Jamie Muir) ===
- The Music Improvisation Company (ECM, 1970) with Christine Jeffrey
- The Music Improvisation Company 1968–1971 (Incus, 1968–71 [1976])

=== With Gentle Fire ===
- Gentle Fire [LP] Earle Browne, Four Systems; John Cage, Music for Amplified Toy Pianos and Music for Carillon Nos. 1–3 (performer: Graham Hearn); Christian Wolff, Edges. (Electrola LP IC 065-02 469 and Toshiba LP EAC-80295 [1974])
- Furnival, John. Ode [17-cm CPR included with exhibition catalogue] John Furnival, Ceolfrith Press 1 (1971).
- Gentle Fire. Group Composition IV (excerpt) [cassette included with journal], Live Electronics, Contemporary Music Review, 6 No. 1, (1991).
- Gentle Fire. Group Composition VI (excerpt) [CD included with journal], Not Necessarily English Music, Leonardo Music Journal, Volume 11, (Cambridge MA: MIT Press, 2001)
- Orton, Richard. concert music 5, 17cm LP included in book Approach to Music, Vol. 3, (Oxford, UK,: Oxford University Press, 1971)
- Stokhausen, Karlheinz. Sternklang, Polydor LP 2612031 (2 LPs) (1976); re-issued on Stockhausen Gesamtausgabe CD 18A-B (2 CDs) (1992) (with 16 other performers)
