= Lines Burnt in Light =

Live album by Evan Parker
- Released: 2001
- Recorded: October 11, 2001
- Venue: St Michael and All Angels Church, Chiswick, London
- Genre: Free improvisation
- Length: 1:02:22
- Label: Psi; 01.01

Evan Parker chronology
The Ayes Have It (2001)	Lines Burnt in Light (2001)	2 X 3 = 5 (2001)

Lines Burnt in Light is a live solo soprano saxophone album by Evan Parker. It was recorded on October 11, 2001, at St Michael and All Angels Church, Chiswick, London, and was issued on CD later that year by Psi Records as the label's inaugural release. Track one was recorded prior to the audience's arrival, while the remaining two tracks were recorded in concert. The album is dedicated to the memory of recording engineer Michael Gerzon, and cover art was provided by Roger Ackling.

== Reception ==
Professional ratings
Review scores
Source	Rating
All About Jazz	5/5 stars
AllMusic	4/5 stars
The Encyclopedia of Popular Music	4/5 stars
The Penguin Guide to Jazz	3.5/4 stars

The editors of DownBeat included the album in their survey of the "Best CDs of the 2000s."

In a review for AllMusic, François Couture wrote: "the mesmerizing, hypnotizing effect works great and the technique is simply stunning... Lines Burnt in Light stands as one of if not the best document illustrating the man's circular breathing/playing. Strongly recommended, especially to newcomers."

The authors of The Penguin Guide to Jazz Recordings stated: "Parker fires off incredible streams of notes, but here he is able to use the church acoustic almost like a studio reverb, building layers of harmonics to almost unbelievable levels... no one... will leave the experience unmoved and unimpressed."

LA Weekly's Tony Mostrom described the music as "a fully integrated, virtuosic horizontal line of intricate complexity on which fluttering motifs emerge, repeat at times and submerge back into the flux, recombining endlessly," and commented: "these tightly packed DNA coils of twittering duck calls and bird chirps... remind one of Heraclitus' famous river, the one you can’t step into twice."

The editors of All About Jazz awarded the album a full five stars, and reviewer John Eyles called the music "simply some of the best Parker ever recorded," remarking: "Parker played with a combination of speed and sureness that truly seemed paranormal, surely using some part of his brain beyond rationality or consciousness. Indeed, it seemed that to engage rational thought would cause the whole thing to crash... Awesome, magnificent." AAJ's Mark Corroto wrote: "Parker plies a relentless attack of musical lines. Returning and reworking each as if it were a chant or poem. This isn't pure power jazz as much as it is a persistent, seemingly perpetual line of thought. Each listen is cause for dreaming, day or night." Another AAJ reviewer stated: "Lines Burnt in Light is pure insane genius... Parker insistently pursues a high-level spiritual energy... And he does not relent... this music provides express transportation to another world."

Writing for One Final Note, Derek Taylor commented: "Parker's breath, regulated through moist receptacle of reed, creates a continuous funnel effect of braided multiphonic streams that slip through his horn's bell and are expunged in radiating gouts into the air. The sounds approximate a range of natural sonic phenomenon from bone-dry wind whistling through paint-chipped eaves, to the hungry colloquy of infant songbirds, to the manic twisting of an antique radio dial through a register of revolving frequencies."

In an article for Dusted Magazine, John Eckhardt remarked: "Parker brings together many paradoxes. He's a mystic and a scientist; he's in control and lets go. His playing is sophisticated and archaic, intelligent and trance-inducing, traditional and experimental, and much more. It was very inspiring to hear that thsee kinds of complex and emergent dynamics can actually come from a single human being."

== Track listing ==
1. "Line 1" – 27:23
2. "Line 2" – 12:30
3. "Line 3" – 22:20

== Personnel ==
- Evan Parker – soprano saxophone
