= Hans Koller (pianist) =

Hans Koller (born Landshut, 10 November 1970) is a German-born UK-based jazz pianist. His debut album Magic Mountain (1997) established him as one of the leading new jazz composers in the UK."He lives in Kingston, London with his daughter, son and wife."

== Discography ==
- Magic Mountain (1997)
- Thelonious Monk, co-led with Jim Rattigan (2023, Three Worlds)
