= Cafe Oto =

Music venue in Dalston, London, England

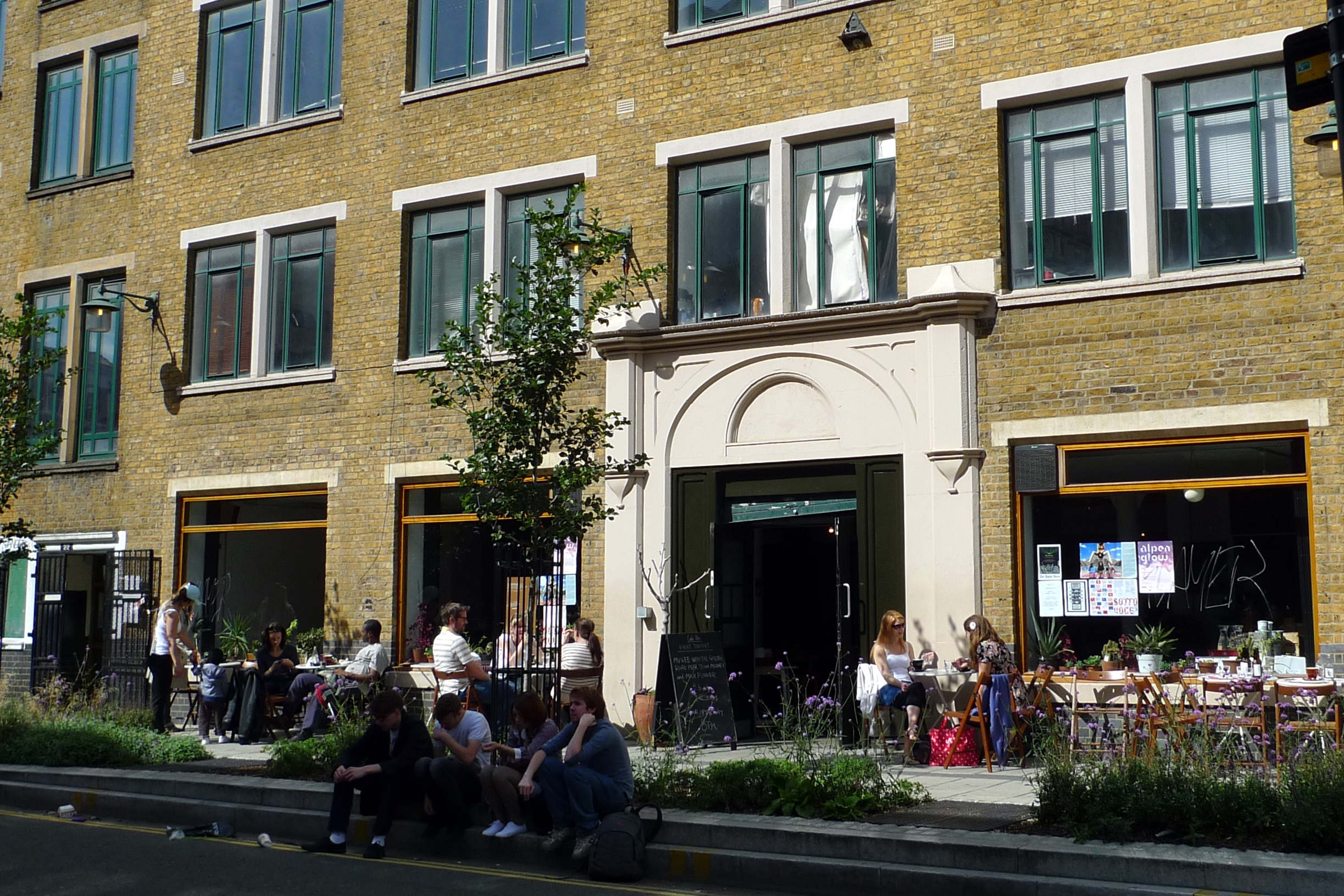
- A view to the entrance to Cafe Oto
- Interactive map of Cafe Oto
- Address: 18–22 Ashwin Street; London; England
- Coordinates: 51.5469°N 0.0747°W

Construction
- Opened: 2008

Website
- www.cafeoto.co.uk

Cafe Oto is a restaurant and bar offering free jazz, experimental , and free improvisation performances located in the Dalston district of London, England.

== History ==
The building was originally occupied by a paint mixing company from 1866 to 1954. During the 1990s, the space was used as a club. Cafe Oto was opened in 2008 by Hamish Dunbar and Keiko Yamamoto with funding from a local investment charity. It has subsequently been the recipient of Arts Council England funding. The Cafe provides a platform for experimental music ranging across all genres from folk, rock, noise, to electronica. The venue is a single room with a 150-person capacity.

Occasionally, artists take up a brief residence across an entire week, such as Sun Ra Arkestra playing five nights in a row. The venue is used to record live albums released under the cafe's OTOROKU label, among them Peter Brötzmann, John Butcher, Lol Coxhill, Phil Durrant, Fred Frith, Mats Gustafsson, Alexander Hawkins, Joe McPhee, Roscoe Mitchell, Thurston Moore, Paal Nilssen-Love, Steve Noble, Other Dimensions in Music, Han-Earl Park, Evan Parker, Eddie Prevost, Ivo Perelman, Matthew Shipp, Damo Suzuki and Ken Vandermark.

Around the corner from the venue, Cafe Oto maintains the Oto Project Space, utilised by aspiring artists and filmmakers to develop their craft through practice and workshop areas. In May 2020, the venue launched a new in-house digital label, TakuRoku, featuring works created in response to the London lockdown and social distancing measures, with 50% of the profits going directly to the artist, providing a way to help sustain both Cafe Oto and the artists involved.

== Critical reception ==
In 2012, Cafe Oto was noted by Vogue Italia as the 'coolest venue in London'.

In 2025, composer Daniel Blumberg thanked the venue in his acceptance speech at the Oscars.

== Links ==
- Cafe Oto Homepage
