= Henry Kuntz =

American jazz musician

Henry Kuntz is a free jazz saxophonist and multi-instrumentalist. In 1979 he founded Hummingbird Records and Tapes, which released, among other things, live recordings of his free jazz trio, Trio Opeye. Cadence Magazine described his multitrack recording technique as "ushering in a new approach to free improvisation". Writer John Litweiler singles out Kuntz as being a jazz musician still exploring free improvisation.

== Partial discography ==
- 1979 Cross-Eyed Priest
- 1980 Ancient Of Days, Light Of Glory
- 1981 New World Music (with John Kuntz)
- 1998 One One & One (with Don Marvel)
- 2006 The Magic Of Mystery
