= John Russell (musician) =

English guitarist (1954–2021)

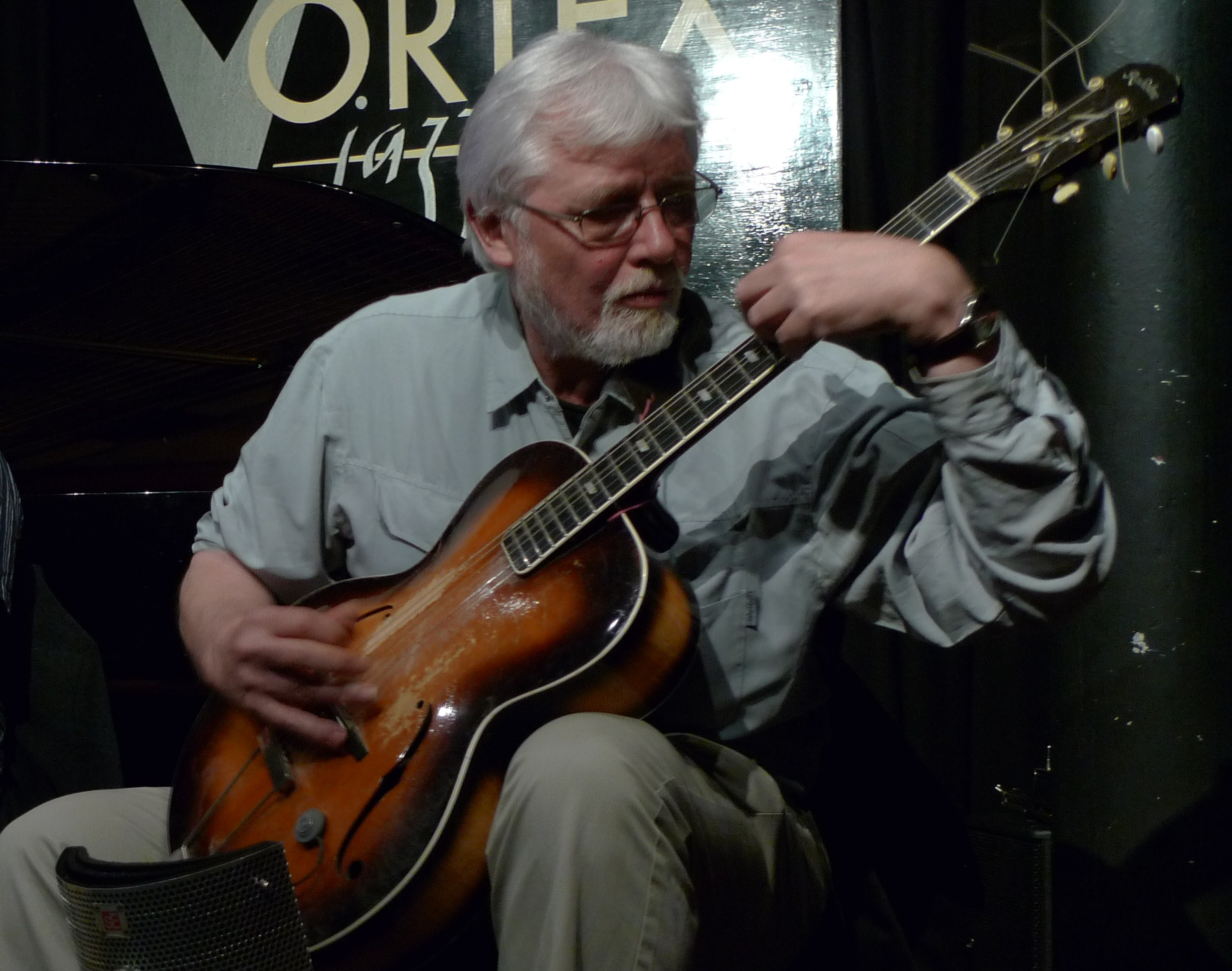
- John Russell performs with Mopomoso at the Vortex Jazz Club in April 2010.

Background information
- Born: 19 December 1954; Kent, England
- Died: 19 January 2021 (aged 66)
- Genres: Free improvisation
- Occupation: Musician
- Instrument: Guitar
- Years active: 1970s–2021

John Russell (19 December 1954 – 19 January 2021) was an acoustic guitarist who worked in free improvisation beginning in the 1970s. He promoted concerts and appeared on more than 50 recordings.

== Career ==
Russell was born in Battersea and grew up in Ruckinge, Kent. His grandfather gave him his first guitar at the age of eleven. A fan of blues, Russell taught himself guitar in school and started a band. At seventeen he moved to London and began playing at the Little Theatre Club run by drummer John Stevens, becoming a member of the Musicians' Co-op and organizing concerts. In 1975, he helped start the journal Musics. For a year Russell received weekly lessons in conventional technique from Derek Bailey. Two years later he gave up electric guitar to concentrate on acoustic.

In 1983, he appeared in the Channel 4 TV documentary Jazz on Four: Crossing Bridges, which examined guitarists Brian Godding, Fred Frith, Ron Geesin, Hans Reichel, and Keith Rowe. In 1988 Russell helped establish Acta Records with John Butcher and Phil Durrant to release the trio's debut album, Conceits.

In the mid-1980s Russell founded the club Mopomoso with pianist and trumpeter Chris Burn. The club promoted around 300 regular monthly concerts at the Red Rose Club in London until the venue's transfer of ownership in January 2008. The club was moved to the Vortex Jazz Club later that same year. Performers included Richard Barrett, Steve Beresford, Lawrence Casserley, Tania Chen, Lol Coxhill, John Coxon, Max Eastley, Alexander Hawkins, Tim Hodgkinson, Caroline Kraabel, Phil Minton, Louis Moholo, Maggie Nicols, Gino Robair, Sabu Toyozumi, Roger Turner, Cleveland Watkiss, Trevor Watts, and Veryan Weston.

Mopomoso hosted an annual Christmas event with improvising musicians, workshops, and Fete Quaqua where musicians played in groupings over three evenings, similar to Derek Bailey's Company Week.

Russell led a trio with Butcher and Durrant and duos with Turner, Stefan Keune, Phil Minton, Evan Parker, and Luc Houtkamp. In 1981, he founded Quaqua, an ensemble that varies in size and draws from a pool of improvisers.

=== Later ===
In 2009 Russell formed House Full of Floors with Parker and John Edwards. In his later years he returned to electric guitar in several live performances, including as part of Parker's Electro-Acoustic band and in a duo with Thurston Moore of the rock band Sonic Youth. In December 2014 he played in a concert with Parker and Moore and to celebrate his 60th birthday, despite being under hospital supervision for a heart condition.

His feature on the late Japanese improvising guitarist, Masayuki Takayanagi was broadcast on BBC Radio 3's Jazz on 3 on 22 February 2010.

In 2013 Sound and Music took the club on a seven date tour of England. Material recorded on this tour was later released as a box set on Weekertoft, a label Russell founded in 2016 with Irish pianist Paul G. Smyth.

== Personal ==
After a quadruple heart bypass operation in March 2015 Russell was reported to be "well on the road to recovery". He died from cancer in January 2021, aged 66.

== Discography ==
=== As leader ===
- Home Cooking/Guitar Solos (Incus, 1979)
- Artless Sky (Caw 1980)
- Conceits (Acta, 1987)
- Birthdays with Roger Turner (Emanem, 1996)
- The Fairly Young Bean (Emanem, 1999)
- The Second Sky with Roger Turner (Emanem, 2001)
- From Next to Last (Emanem, 2002)
- Mopomoso Solos 2002 (Emanem, 2004)
- Three Planets (Emanem, 2004)
- Analekta (Emanem, 2007)
- Duet (Another Timbre, 2010)
- Hyste (Psi, 2010)
- With... (Emanem, 2015)
- The Dukes of Bedford with Henry Kaiser (Fractal/Balance Point, 2020)

=== As sideman ===
With John Butcher

- News from the Shed (Acta, 1989)
- Concert Moves (Random Acoustics, 1995)
- The Scenic Route (Emanem, 1999)

With Evan Parker

- London Air Lift (FMP, 1997)
- Strings with Evan Parker (Emanem, 2001)
- Crossing the River (psi, 2006)
- House Full of Floors (Tzadik, 2009)
- Walthamstow Moon (ByrdOut, 2017)
- Reunion Live from Cafe Oto (FMR, 2017)

With others

- Martin Archer, Wild Pathway Favourites (Ladder, 1988)
- Terry Day, 2006 Duos (Emanem, 2007)
- Mats Gustafsson, Birds (dEN, 2012)
- Mats Gustafsson, A Duo(s) (Bocian, 2015)
- Radu Malfatti, Ohrkiste (ITM, 1992)
- Jon Rose, Forward of Short Leg (Dossier, 1987)
