= Ocean of Sound =

1995 book and 1996 album by David Toop

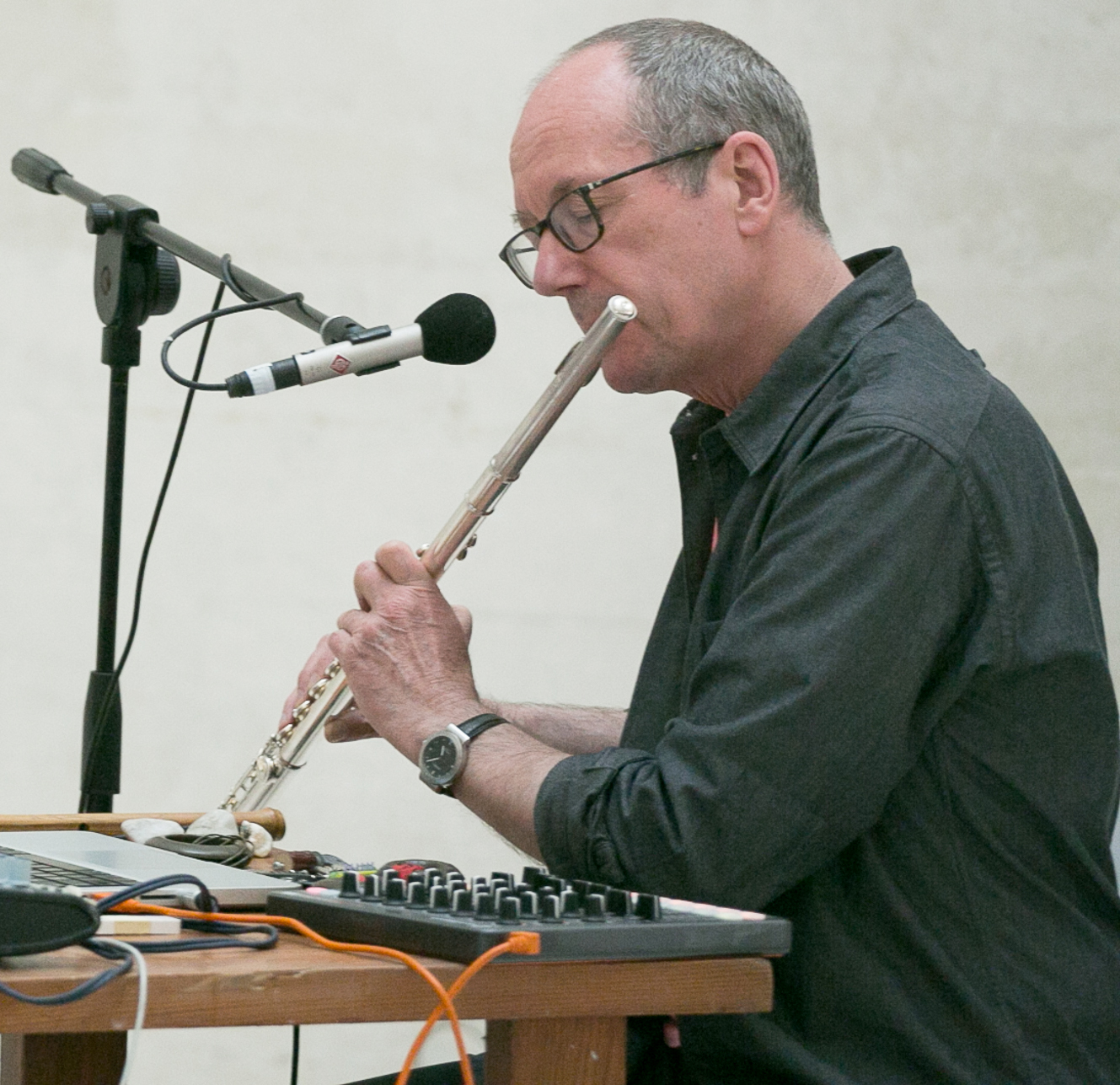
Toop in 2015

Ocean of Sound is both a 1995 book and 1996 companion compilation album by David Toop. The two-disc, cross-licensed "various artists" compilation contains 32 tracks culled from a variety of musical sources, including dub, exotica, free jazz, and field recordings. Toop compiled the recordings to serve as both a historical survey of ambient music and an aural companion to the book.

Ocean of Sound was released in January 1996 by Virgin Records. It was well received by music critics and finished fourth in the voting for The Village Voice's annual Pazz & Jop poll. The album later went out of print.

== Background ==
In 1995, David Toop published his second book, Ocean of Sound: Aether Talk, Ambient Sound and Imaginary Worlds, which examined music as a medium for deep mental involvement. In the book, Toop said that ambient music can be defined as music listened for relaxation or music that "taps into the disturbing, chaotic undertow of the environment". As an aural companion to the book, Toop curated the compilation album Ocean of Sound, which would also serve as a historical survey of ambient music. The album was released in January 1996 by Virgin Records. It later went out of print, which music journalist Michaelangelos Matos said was because such cross-licensed compilation albums "seldom stay available for very long".

== Music ==
Ocean of Sound

Compilation album by Various artists
- Released: January 1996
- Genre: Ambient
- Length: 148:55
- Label: Virgin
- Producer: David Toop
- Compiler: David Toop

David Toop chronology
Pink Noir (1996)	Ocean of Sound (1996)	Spirit World (1997)

Ocean of Sound is a two-disc, cross-licensed "various artists" compilation that contains 32 tracks culled from a variety of musical sources, including dub, exotica, free jazz, and field recordings. According to AllMusic's John Bush, all of the songs compiled for the album recapitulate the theme of the book—"that Les Baxter, Aphex Twin, The Beach Boys, Herbie Hancock, King Tubby and My Bloody Valentine are all related by their effect on sound pioneering." In an interview for Perfect Sound Forever, Toop explained why he included free jazz on an album of ambient music, which is commonly thought of as background music:

I was making a point about the immersive quality of 20th century musical experiences. Immersion is the key word for me; not background. The whole idea of background music was a red herring, a distraction – there is no such thing as background music, in the sense that so-called background music is always deployed (though not always accepted) as a lifestyle accessory and lifestyle is a collection of strong signifiers.

Toop programmed the recordings for the album so that they would segue into one another. Ocean of Sound begins with songs by Jamaican dub producer King Tubby, American jazz keyboardist Herbie Hancock, and English electronic musician Aphex Twin, respectively, before transitioning to compositions by Claude Debussy, John Cage, the Beach Boys, and Peter Brötzmann, as well as an audio recording of Buddhist monks. Toop programmed the Velvet Underground's 1968 song "I Heard Her Call My Name" so that its muted feedback would segue into an underwater recording of bearded seals barking.

== Critical reception ==
=== Album ===
Professional ratings
Review scores
Source	Rating
AllMusic	4.5/5 stars
Christgau's Consumer Guide	A

Reviewing for The Wire in 1996, Peter Shapiro said he was impressed by how Ocean of Sound highlighted musical similarities among its disparate artists, calling it a manifestation of the book's discussion and "a remarkable collection of great music". The Independent wrote that "Toop navigates smoothly between the various strands that have contributed to the current techno/'fourth-world' style of ambient-pop", because he used sources such as Oriental music, minimalism, and classical composers. Michaelangelo Matos from the Chicago Reader viewed it as an idyllic compilation whose songs segued fluently because of Toop's aesthetic, while noting they could also stand alone as interesting, if not excellent, separate pieces: "Ocean of Sound is one of those records that have something to teach even the most jaded music fan about how to listen to music." AllMusic's John Bush recommended the album to any "wide-ranging ambient fan" and said that it illustrates the ideas in Toop's book "beautifully".

Ocean of Sound was voted the fourth best compilation of 1996 in the Pazz & Jop, an annual poll of American critics published by The Village Voice. Robert Christgau, the poll's supervisor, named it the year's best compilation in his own list for the Pazz & Jop. In Christgau's Consumer Guide: Albums of the '90s (2000), he deemed it a "gorgeously segued 32-track tour of trad ambient" with recordings that were smaller representations of larger generational concerns such as disorder and anxiety: "For Toop, it answers a need that's both postmodern and millennial, synthesizing insecurity and hope, 'bliss' and 'non-specific dread.'" In a 2011 list for Spin, Chuck Eddy named Ocean of Sound the most essential album of ambient music, writing that its 32 tracks "flowed into each other like the seven seas".

== Track listing ==
Disc one
No.	Title	Writer(s)	Artist	Length
1.	"Dub Fi Gwan" (produced by Bunny Lee)	Edward O'Sullivan Lee	King Tubby	3:56
2.	"Rain Dance" (produced by Dave Rubinson)	Herbie Hancock	Herbie Hancock	8:41
3.	"Analogue Bubblebath I" (produced by Richard D. James)	Richard D. James	Aphex Twin	4:40
4.	"Empire III" (produced by Dan Lanois and Jon Hassell)	Jon Hassell	Jon Hassell	6:58
5.	"Sorban Palid"	Ujang Suryana	Ujang Suryana	6:16
6.	"Prélude à L'Après-midi D'un Faune" (produced by Andrew Keener)	Claude Debussy	English Chamber Orchestra	9:37
7.	"Sunken City"	Les Baxter	Les Baxter	2:47
8.	"Loomer" (produced by Kevin Shields)	Bilinda Butcher, Kevin Shields	My Bloody Valentine	2:36
9.	"Lizard Point" (produced by Brian Eno)	Axel Gros, Bill Laswell, Brian Eno, Michael Beinhorn	Brian Eno	3:59
10.	"Shunie Omizutori Buddhist Ceremony" (recorded by Yoshihiro Kawasaki)		unknown artist	6:45
11.	"The Music of Horns and Whistles" (produced by World Soundscape Project)	World Soundscape Project	The Vancouver Soundscape	2:08
12.	"Howler Monkeys" (produced by Jean C. Roche)		no artist	1:26
13.	"Machine Gun" (produced by Jost Gebers and Peter Brötzmann)	Peter Brötzmann	Peter Brötzmann Octet	5:58
14.	"Yanomami Rain Song" (recorded by David Toop)		unknown artist	3:03
15.	"Bismillahi 'Rrahmani 'Rrahim" (produced by Brian Eno)	Harold Budd	Harold Budd	4:48

Disc two
No.	Title	Writer(s)	Artist	Length
1.	"Black Satin" (produced by Teo Macero)	Miles Davis	Miles Davis	5:09
2.	"Extract from Poppy Nogood 'All Night Flight'" (produced by Gary Todd)		Terry Riley	8:09
3.	"Coyor Panon" (produced by Lilik Arabowo and Makoto Kubota)	traditional	Detty Kurnia	5:36
4.	"Virgin Beauty" (produced by Denardo Coleman)	Ornette Coleman	Ornette Coleman	3:28
5.	"Chen Pe'i Pe'i" (produced by Jean Rochard)	Toop, John Zorn	John Zorn & David Toop	2:57
6.	"Rivers of Mercury" (produced by Paul Schütze)	Paul Schütze	Paul Schütze	6:31
7.	"I Heard Her Call My Name" (produced by Tom Wilson)	Lou Reed	The Velvet Underground	4:32
8.	"Bearded Seals" (produced by Jean C. Roche)		no artist	2:41
9.	"Boat – Woman – Song" (produced by Holger Czukay)	Holger Czukay, Rolf Dammers	Holger Czukay & Rolf Dammers	5:47
10.	"Fall Breaks and Back Into Winter (Woody Woodpecker Symphony)"	Brian Wilson	The Beach Boys	2:02
11.	"Faraway Chant" (produced by Adrian Sherwood)	Adrian Maxwell, Michael Williams	African Headcharge	3:49
12.	"Cosmo Enticement"	Sun Ra	Sun Ra	2:59
13.	"Untitled 3" (produced by John Hadden)	Derek Bailey, Evan Parker, Hugh Davies, Jamie Muir	The Music Improvisation Company	6:24
14.	"Seven-Up"	Deep Listening Band	Deep Listening Band	2:27
15.	"In a Landscape" (produced by Brian Eno)	John Cage	John Cage	6:26
16.	"Vexations" (produced by Thomas Wilbrandt)	Erik Satie	Alan Marks	2:57
17.	"Suikinkutsu Water Chime" (recorded by Yoshihiro Kawasaki)		no artist	2:55
Total length:				148:55

== Personnel ==
Credits for Ocean of Sound are adapted from AllMusic.

- African Head Charge – performer
- Aphex Twin – performer, producer
- Les Baxter – performer
- The Beach Boys – performer
- Peter Brötzmann – producer
- Harold Budd – performer
- John Cage – performer
- Denardo Coleman – producer
- Ornette Coleman – performer
- Holger Czukay – performer, producer
- Rolf Dammers – performer
- Miles Davis – performer
- Deep Listening Band – performer
- English Chamber Orchestra – performer
- Brian Eno – performer, producer
- Jost Gebers – producer
- John Hadden – producer
- Herbie Hancock – performer
- Jon Hassell – performer
- Simon Heyworth – mastering
- Yoshihiro Kawasaki – engineer
- Andrew Keener – producer
- King Tubby – performer
- Makoto Kubota – producer
- Detty Kurnia – performer
- Daniel Lanois – producer
- Bunny Lee – producer
- Teo Macero – producer
- Alan Marks – performer, piano
- Susan Milan – flute
- Russell Mills – art direction, design
- Alan Moulder – engineer
- Music Improvisation Company – performer
- My Bloody Valentine – performer
- Sun Ra – performer
- Terry Riley – performer
- Jean Rochard – producer
- Jean C. Roché – producer
- David Rubinson – producer
- Paul Schütze – performer, producer
- Adrian Sherwood – producer
- Kevin Shields – producer
- Ujang Suryana – performer
- Gary L. Todd – producer
- David Toop – compilation producer, engineer, liner notes, performer
- Paul Tortelier – conductor
- Vancouver Soundscape – performer
- The Velvet Underground – performer
- Michael Webster – design
- Thomas Wilbrant – producer
- Tom Wilson – producer
- World Soundscape Project – producer
- John Zorn – performer

== See also ==
- Virgin Ambient series
