= Musics (magazine) =

Magazine covering free improvised music

- Categories: Entertainment
- Frequency: Weekly
- Founded: 1975
- Country: United Kingdom
- Based in: London
- Language: English
- Website: Facebook

Musics was a music-related magazine that was published from 1975 to 1979.

In 1975 Derek Bailey, Steve Beresford, Max Boucher, Paul Burwell, Jack Cooke, Peter Cusack, Hugh Davies, Mandy and Martin Davidson, Richard Leigh, Evan Parker, John Russell, David Toop, Philipp Wachsmann and Colin Wood came together and agreed to produce a magazine.

It was independently published and dedicated to the coverage of free improvised music. Its need was suggested in a conversation between Evan Parker and Mandy and Martin Davidson. The title was proposed by Paul Burwell at the first meeting in the Davidsons' house and unanimously adopted.

Musics, headquartered in London, has not been published since 1979.

In 2016 the Ecstatic Peace Library published Musics: A British Magazine of Improvised Music & Art 1975–79, a facsimile reprint of all issues of the magazine with a foreword by Steve Beresford, an introduction by David Toop, and afterword by Thurston Moore. Eva Prinz and Thurston Moore hosted an exposition on the magazine and the book, covering it at the Red Gallery on Rivington Street in London in July 2017.

== History and profile ==
Musics was launched with Issue No. 1 April/May 1975 with the banner "MUSICS an impromental experivisation arts magazine". The journal was distributed in the UK and worldwide.

Mandy Davidson edited the first issue. Soon afterwards she moved to the US, and it was decided there would be no permanent editor. Max Boucher was appointed production editor. The 'editorial board' moved quickly towards becoming a collective. Each collective member contributed £4 to cover the costs of the first issue, which was run off on an A3 Gestetner duplicator. Issue no.2 was pasted up and printed by offset-litho. Over time the print run was increased and all income was ploughed back. Eventually it was possible to pay the printers (Islington Community Press) to make the plates and run off the copies. However collective members continued to do all the unpaid work of editing and preparing the camera ready artwork. No editors, writers, designers, or photographers were ever paid.

Limiting expenditure was only part of the financial model. From the beginning the Musics collective took the position that they would not accept paid advertising or grant aid, and the only income came from subscriptions and sales through (mostly alternative) bookshops. In addition there were associates in cities such as Bristol and Glasgow who sold copies through local outlets and at performances. In the final months there was an imminent financial crisis, but this was resolved through a successful jumble sale.

The policy of financial independence was copied from Libération, the French daily paper which had no paid ads. The two publications shared a vibrant pluralism, due to their freedom from the influence of advertisers or funding bodies. Musics and Libe were informally affiliated, as can be seen from occasional mutual references in archived copies. Both have a dynamic energy which radiates from the pages - in Musics perhaps almost reaching perfection. (Liberation later reverted to the standard model and it continues in name only.)

Musics came out six times a year, with occasional exceptions.

Musics proposed the destruction of artificial boundaries and linked jazz, the music of composers such as John Cage, and indigenous and non-European musics. It was significant in the discussion of traditional Asian instruments (Clive Bell) as paths of equal value for the performance of musics, a term that discarded the use of the word "jazz".

Early issue covered audio soundscape work, reviewing performance events from a cliff-top piano hurling festival or burning pianos, trap set improvisation against a rising sea tide that drowned cymbals and floated and retuned toms, or drummer Han Bennink's inclusion of saws and power tools in his percussion set. Electronics were explored as micro-environments at a level of equality with acoustic instruments in the precursors of glitch, such as the STEIM experiments with the cracklebox or the circuit board work of Hugh Davies (1943–2005), and an attack on the possibilities of brass instruments, notably by Steve Lacy and Evan Parker.

Lindsay Cooper in her essay Women, Music, Feminism – notes in Musics #14 (October 1977) analyzed how to overcome gender roles in music.

Tensions and unresolved contradictions accumulated. A small faction formed within the collective and soon un-democratically added to the artwork for the front cover of issue no.23 the words FINAL ISSUE.
