= Guitar, Drums 'n' Bass =

Studio album by Derek Bailey
- Released: 21 August 1996
- Recorded: Spring–September 1995, Birmingham, England and Bill Laswell's studio, New York City
- Genre: Free improvisation; drum and bass
- Length: 39:09
- Label: Avant
- Producer: Derek Bailey; DJ Ninj

Derek Bailey chronology
Harras (1996)	Guitar, Drums 'n' Bass (1996)	The Sign of Four (1997)

Guitar, Drums 'n' Bass is an album by free improvisation guitarist Derek Bailey, released by Avant Records in 1996. After spending several years improvising his guitar to the sound of jungle and drum and bass music on pirate radio, Bailey proposed to collaborator John Zorn that he make an album of his musical fusion. Zorn then contacted Birmingham-based drum and bass producer D.J. Ninj to provide the musical backing, who recorded his contributions in spring 1995. After a failed session with engineer Mick Harris, Bailey recorded his overlaid guitar improvisations in Bill Laswell's New York City studio in October 1995, slightly altering Ninj's contributions to remove electric piano passages.

The resulting album has been considered the first duet's fusion of free improvisation guitar and breakbeat music ever released. Ninj's drum and bass backing is thudding and minimal, while Bailey's guitar playing is inventive, loud and fast, incorporating truncated licks, heavy distortion and chiming sounds. The album was released to critical acclaim, with some critics finding the album's pairing inspiring. The album is regarded as Bailey's first genre experiment of the mid-late 1990s, a period in which Bailey recorded with unlikely non-improvising collaborators.

== Background ==
Free improvisation guitarist Derek Bailey's involvement with jungle and drum and bass came via coincidence around 1993, discovering the genres when flickering through radio and discovering them on pirate radio. Bailey, then aged 64, enjoyed practising along to percussion and the jungle music he was hearing struck him, so he subsequently began practising along to it, although for a long period of time he was unaware of the genre's name. He first, unsuccessfully, attempted to discover the name by asking a six-year-old boy in Bailey's local newsagent, who played jungle and drum and bass on his personal stereo, but discovered the name 'drum and bass' when reading about it in The Times. Bailey began making tapes of his guitar improvisations to jungle music on the radio. His attraction to drum and bass was the genre's rawness and non-musical qualities. He explained:

"The general bustle, it doesn't hang about, it moves. [...] It's most common to get eight bars and then repeat it, but that isn't the case in drum'n'bass as I heard it. There were structures, but not logical structures. For me, that was one of its attractions, it wasn’t music. I also liked its ambiguities about the time. If you had a drummer like that, he would never play with a bass player like that. It's a really fantastic feel."

Bailey's experiments also included an additional, 'random' element as a result of the broken cassette player he had been using to tape the pirate radio broadcast. He explained: "I thought, 'This sounds great', and then I realised it was playing back faster than it was originally." American avant-garde musician John Zorn approached Bailey shortly afterwards, asking him to record three albums with alternate rhythm sections–including dub bassist Bill Laswell, noise rock group Ruins and drummer Tony Williams. Bailey's "accelerated" jungle radio bootlegs "seemed to offer amazing possibilities" for the project, so the guitarist sent a tape of his drum and bass-backed improvisations to Zorn and suggested to him that he could make an album of it. Zorn agreed, ensuring Bailey that the project would be quick to record and release. Zorn tracked down D.J. Ninj, a 22-year old drum and bass DJ from Birmingham, to provide the drum and bass music for the project. The DJ agreed to participate.

== Recording ==
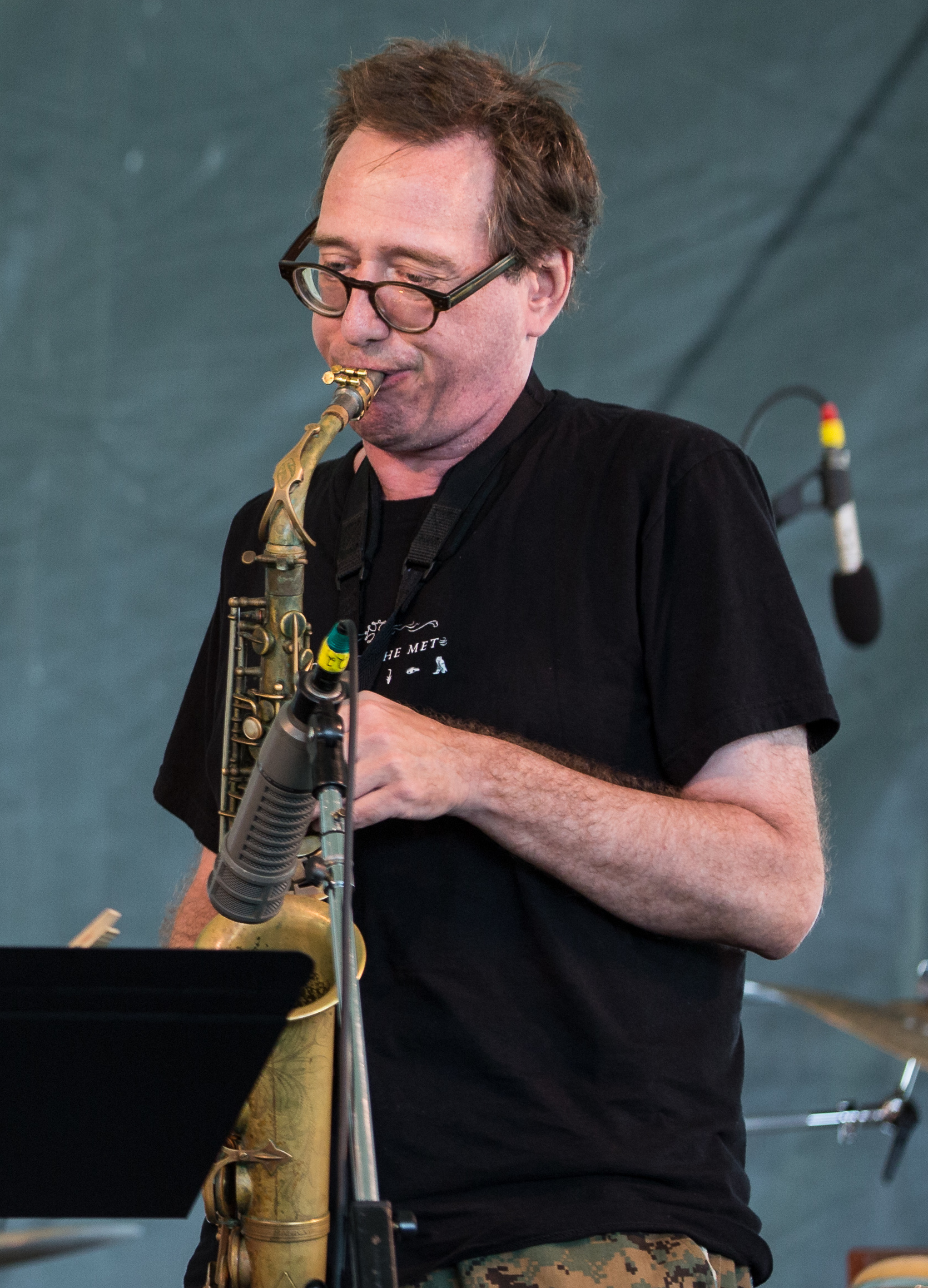
John Zorn acted as executive producer and arranged the collaboration and recording sessions.

Ninj sent Bailey a Digital Audio Tape of his own music to improvise over, recorded in his native Birmingham in spring 1995. From New York City, Zorn and Laswell arranged for Bailey to record his parts in a Birmingham studio run by Mick Harris in June 1995, with Harris as engineer. Although Bailey was able to set up the day before, he realised the studio had no suitable armless chairs for him to sit on as he improvised, this being his traditional recording set-up. He briefly tried to use the studio's drum stool, but it was broken and "kind of weaved around," so it was "a fairly skillful business" for Bailey to sit upright on it. Returning the next day to record, he realised the problems turned towards Harris, who Bailey felt was incapable of mixing a Digital Audio Tape or live instrument. The guitarist began improvising to Ninj's first piece, only to find Harris–who believed Bailey to be warming up–had not recorded it. They started anew again and finished unsuccessfully 40 minutes later, by which point Bailey had been "into the control box a few times."

Bailey said that by the third take, "it was possible to detect that there was a guitar player" on the recordings. Though he was playing relatively loud, this did not automatically ensure "anything if you're mixing," and Harris' tape once again did not contain Bailey's improvising. After some time, Bailey could hear rainfall and asked Harris to "turn the fucking thing up," but again, nothing made it on to tape. Though the presence of Ninj at the session, who was fascinated by Bailey's improvising, had kept Bailey's spirits high, Bailey and Harris were becoming frustrated and the former abandoned the session there, at which point Harris suggested Bailey use Laswell's studio in New York, which Bailey soon arranged with Zorn, hoping to hire Bob Musso as engineer.

Bailey took Ninj's tape to New York in September 1995 to record his contributions in Laswell's studio. Upon arrival, he removed passages of electric piano from Ninj's tape which he was not interested in. Speaking of the electronic piano passages, he said: "I gather that that is a recent development [in drum and bass]. But I thought the drums and bass were real nice. So we took all that out and left spaces." They then played back the entire tape and Bailey played along in one take. In The Sunday Times, Stewart Lee wrote: "In stripping away Ninj's embellishments, Bailey re-created the original, simpler drum'n'bass model, but he is worried he may have offended Ninj's musical ambitions. Tellingly, perhaps, the young DJ hasn't been in touch since the project." Allan Tucker mastered the album, with Zorn credited as executive producer and Kazunori Sugiyama as assistant producer.

== Composition ==
Rick Anderson of AllMusic described Guitar, Drums 'n' Bass as possibly "the first program of guitar/breakbeat duets" ever recorded, whilst in The Sunday Times, Stewart Lee called the album "perhaps the most abrasive retake on the drum'n'bass formulas to date." The programming itself was described by Anderson as somewhat perverse. Ninj's thudding drum and bass music on the album, described by Lee as exemplifying the genre at its most minimalist, is mixed into the background, which gives the percussion sound "a certain off-hand flavour." Bailey said Ninj's contribution was "a beautiful piece, about 50 minutes – in fact it's five pieces I think." Bailey's overlaid guitar playing is inventive and ranges "from sheets of distortion to clear ringing chimes." The guitar work also features unorthodox truncated licks. Bailey plays with such a ferocity that he, in Anderson's words, "[skirls] out ideas at such a rate that it's hard to keep up," though Bailey's guitar and DJ Ninj's double-speed breakbeats are occasionally in tempo with each other. The album's longest track is "DNJBB", a 14-minute, episodic piece containing frequent silences, giving it the effect of four of five consecutive tracks, each with a similar breakbeat.

Guitar, Drums 'n' Bass is one of the first of Bailey's genre experiments of the mid-late 1990s, marking his first time exploring disparate genres since his 1980 book Improvisation: Its Nature and Practice, in which Bailey explored the usage of improvisation in jazz, flamenco and Indian classical music. Bailey biographer Ben Watson described Bailey's "unlikely" collaborations with D.J. Ninj and other musicians such as Bill Laswell, tap dancer Will Gaines, and with funk musicians Jamaaladeen Tacuma and Calvin Weston on the album Mirakle (2000), as "consummate examples" of perverse music, a style described by Bailey collaborator Simon H. Fell in 2000 to refer to his ever-changing musical style.

== Release and reception ==
Professional ratings
Review scores
Source	Rating
AllMusic	3/5 stars
The Penguin Guide to Jazz Recordings	3.5/4 stars

Although recording for Guitars, Drums 'n' Bass was completed in September 1995, it was delayed until John Zorn's Japanese record label Avant Records released it as a limited edition on 21 August 1996, with an album cover designed by Arai Yasunori. It was also released by Koch Records. According to Simon Reynolds, the appearance of the album in 1996 was during a period when many disparate artists experimented with jungle and drum and bass, citing Bailey's experiments as one example of a non-jungle artist "dabbling with sped-up breakbeats" in this era, alongside jazz-pop duo Everything but the Girl and techno producers Aphex Twin and Underworld. Comedian and writer Stewart Lee's introduction to Bailey was through listening to Guitar, Drums 'n' Bass in 1996. The album was re-released as a digital download on 8 July 2015.

Guitar, Drums 'n' Bass received much acclaim. Bradley Bambarger of Billboard described the album as "thrilling", saying that Bailey and D.J. Ninj were "an inspired pairing" and also citing the album as an example of Bailey "[p]referring the company of percussionists and even jungle DJs over other [guitar] players." Stewart Lee, writing for The Sunday Times in 1997, was very favourable, calling the album a "difficult, demanding but ultimately thrilling and utterly unique experience" and describing Bailey's guitar playing as "ceaselessly inventive." Comparing the album to David Bowie's then-new drum and bass-influenced single "Little Wonder" (1997), he said "Bailey's use of drum'n'bass could never be suspected of cashing in on a fad."

More reserved in his assessment was Rick Anderson of AllMusic. He called the album's concept "a brilliant idea, and one that should have worked much better," writing that "Bailey plays with his usual ferocity, skirling out ideas at such a rate that it's hard to keep up – at times, he even plays in tempo with DJ Ninj's double-speed breakbeats, a feat that is impressive physically, not to say musically. But in other places he sounds hesitant, as if baffled by the clattering torrent of rhythm." He did nonetheless concede the record contains "many valuable and exhilarating moments." In his book Modern Jazz Guitar Styles, writer Andre Bush recommends Guitar, Drums 'n' Bass, as well as Bailey's next album, the Pat Metheny collaboration The Sign of Four (1997), for a "small taste of Bailey's vision." The Wire ranked the album at number 4 in their list of the best albums of 1996. Billboard senior writer Chris Morris ranked the album at number 6 in his list of his favourite albums of the year, curated for the magazine's 1997 year-end issue. He described the album as: "Experimental guitar guru moves deep into the jungle."

== Legacy ==
Roughly marking the start of Bailey's late 1990s genre experiments, Guitars, Drums 'n' Bass is cited in the Oxford Dictionary of National Biography 2005–2008 as among the examples of where, "[refusing] to rest on his laurels, [Bailey] undertook a series of encounters that were criticised for their lack of improvisational purity, but steadfastly followed his desire to explore unexpected playing situations." Other examples that were also encouraged by John Zorn were his album with the Ruins, Saisoro (1994), and his Jamaaladeen Tacuma and Calvin Weston collaboration Mirakle (1999). After Bailey's death in 2005, Ben Ratliff of The New York Times wrote of how the album fit in with Bailey's growing interesting in performing with non-improvising musicians:

"Despite [Bailey's] roots in jazz and his professional relationships with many jazz musicians – he played with the drummers Tony Williams and Paul Motian, the saxophonist Steve Lacy and the guitarist Pat Metheny – Mr. Bailey was not playing jazz, nor pretending to. He often referred to his work as "nonidiomatic improvising," meaning that it did not refer to any particular idiom or style. Over time it became its own idiom, and he sought to perform with artists from nonimprovising traditions, like the drum-and-bass producer DJ Ninj and the Chinese pipa player Min Xiao-Fen, and even with nonmusicians, like the Butoh dancer Min Tanaka and the tap dancer Will Gaines."

In their book Audio Culture, Revised Edition: Readings in Modern Music, Christoph Cox and Daniel Warner write that, as a result of the exploiting of new technologies and networks by musicians in the 1990s, the emergent audio culture created "a new kind of sonic literacy, history and memory" they described as "digital", crushing the distinction between "mass culture" and "high art" and treating music history as "a database from which to draw random-access sonic alliances and affinities that ignore established categories." They cited the album–"Derek Bailey puts free improvisation into conversation with drum 'n' bass"– as a key example, alongside Sonic Youth mixing punk rock with the work of experimental music pioneers like Pauline Oliveros on SYR4: Goodbye 20th Century (1999), house and techno producers remixing Steve Reich's composition on the Reich Remixed (1999) album and Björk's collaborations with electronic duo Matmos and free jazz percussionist Chris Corsano, among other examples. More-so than the album itself, Bailey's original improvising over jungle on pirate radio became an influence on Eugene Chadbourne's album Jungle Cookies (1998).

== Track listing ==
1. "N/JZ/BM" (Re-Mix) – 3:33
2. "Re-Re-Re" (Up-Mix) – 1:45
3. "DNJBB" (Cake-Mix) – 13:46
4. "Concrete" (Cement-Mix) – 7:02
5. "Ninj" (De-Mix) – 11:29
6. "Pie" (Amatosis-Mix) – 1:38

== Personnel ==
- Derek Bailey – guitar, electric guitar
- D.J. Ninj – programming, co-production
- Arai Yasunori – cover
- John Zorn – executive producer
- Allan Tucker – mastering
- Kazunori Sugiyama – assistant producer
