= New and Rediscovered Musical Instruments =

Studio album by Max Eastley and David Toop
- Released: December 5, 1975
- Genre: Avant garde, Electronic
- Label: Obscure
- Producer: Brian Eno

New and Rediscovered Musical Instruments is a 1975 album by Max Eastley and David Toop. The album was the fourth release on Brian Eno's Obscure Records.

Toop was a music writer, broadcaster and a member of the London Musicians Collective with a particular interest in ethnic percussion and homemade wind instruments. Eastley was a kinetic sculptor who had created unusual new instruments such as the Centriphone and a Hydraphone. Toop and Eastley used these instruments to create the album.

The album was one of the first four releases on Eno's Obscure Records when they were simultaneously released in a limited edition of 2,000 copies each on December 5, 1975. This release had the catalogue number Obscure no.4. In common with most of the releases on Obscure it was produced by Brian Eno.

== Track listing and personnel ==
Side A
No.	Title	Writer(s)	Length
1.	"Hydrophone"	Max Eastley	8:59
2.	"Metallophone"	Max Eastley	7:02
3.	"The Centriphone"	Max Eastley	4:48
4.	"Elastic Aerophone / Centriphone"	Max Eastley	4:56

Side B
No.	Title	Writer(s)	Length
1.	"Do The Bathosphere"	David Toop	2:35
2.	"The Divination of the Bowhead Whale"	David Toop	16:42
3.	"The Chairs Story"	David Toop	3:30

Track B1

- David Toop
- The Cetaceans - Brian Eno, Chris Murno, Phil Jone

Track B2

- David Toop - Guitar, bowed chordophone
- Brian Eno - Bass
- Paul Burwell - Bass drums, large lorry hub, 2-string fiddle
- Frank Perry - Japanese resting bells
- Hugh Davies - Harp (Grill)

Track B3

- David Toop - Voice, flute, water
