= Ensemble Pieces =

Ensemble Pieces is a 1975 album featuring contemporary classical music by Christopher Hobbs, John Adams and Gavin Bryars.

The work was the second release on Brian Eno's label Obscure Records, catalogue number Obscure no.2.

== Track listing ==
1. Christopher Hobbs ‘Aran’ (3:52)
2. John Adams ‘John Philip Sousa’ (4:24)
3. John Adams ‘Christian Zeal And Activity’ (11:38)
4. John Adams ‘Sentimentals’ (2:49)
5. Christopher Hobbs ‘McCrimmon Will Never Return’ (9:19)
6. Gavin Bryars '1, 2, 1-2-3-4' (14:56)

== Personnel ==
- John Adams – composer, director of the New Music Ensemble of the San Francisco Conservatory of Music
- Derek Bailey – guitar
- Gavin Bryars – reed organ, triangles, wood blocks, cymbals, double bass, composer
- Cornelius Cardew – cello
- Stuart Deeks – violins
- Brian Eno – vocals, producer
- Celia Gollin – vocals
- Andy Mackay – oboe
- The New Music Ensemble of San Francisco Conservatory of Music – strings
- Mike Nicolls – drums
- Paul Nieman – trombone
- John White – reed organ, toy piano, triangles, drums
- Phil Ault – engineer
- Alden Jenks – engineer
