= Gone with the Wind (song) =

Single by Horace Heidt
- Released: 1937
- Songwriters: Allie Wrubel (music); Herb Magidson (lyrics)

"Gone with the Wind" is a popular song that's become a jazz standard. The music was written by Allie Wrubel, the lyrics by Herb Magidson and was published in 1937. A version recorded by Horace Heidt and his Brigadiers was a No. 1 song in 1937.

== Inspiration ==
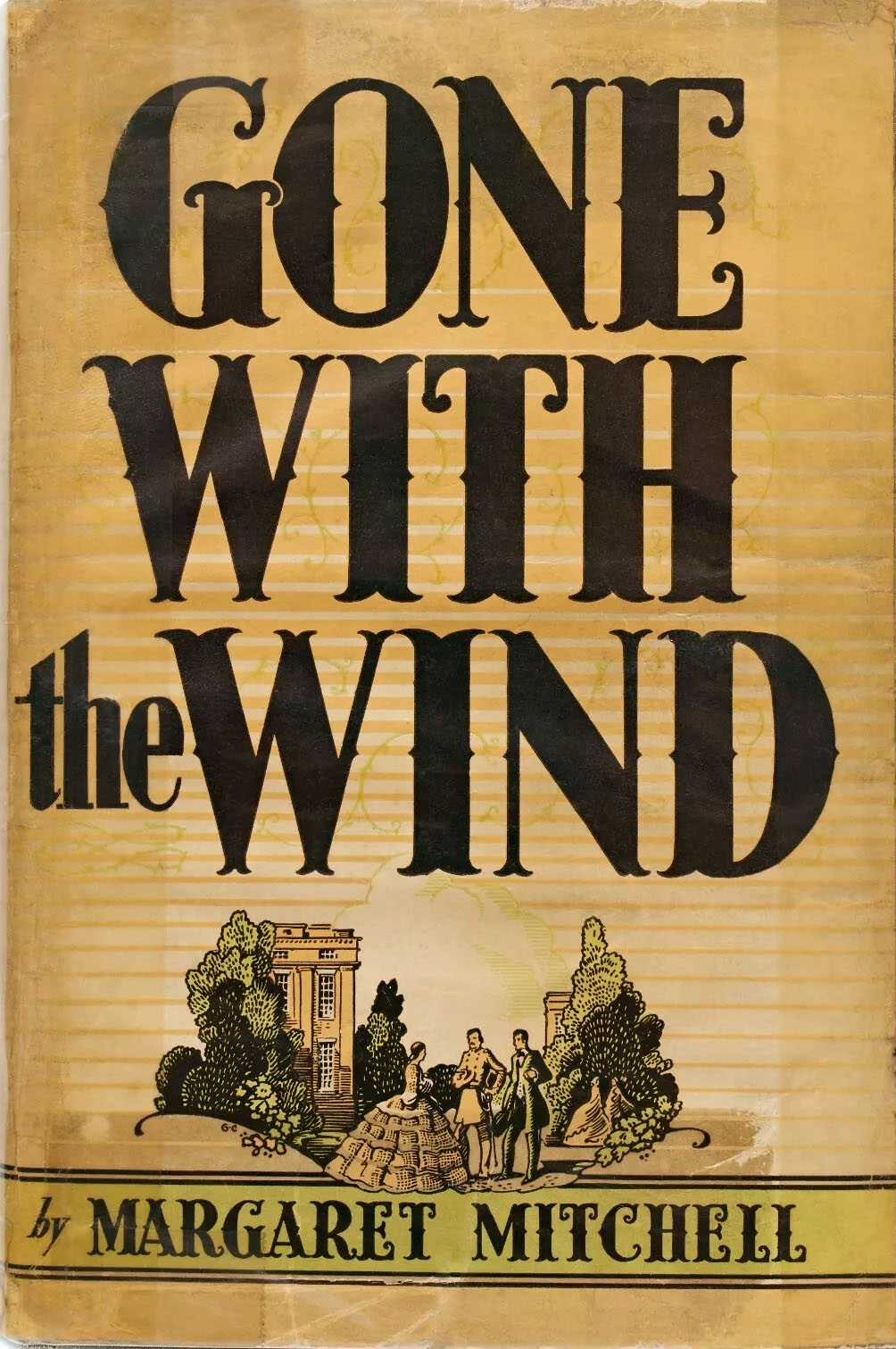
Gone with the Wind (1936) by Margaret Mitchell

The sheet music indicates that the song is "Based upon Margaret Mitchell's Novel, and the motion picture, 'Gone With the Wind'". In addition to the song's popularity, the book also received enormous publicity in 1937, dominating the bestseller lists and winning a Pulitzer Prize.

== Recordings ==
- Lennie Hayton & His Orchestra; Vocal Chorus by Paul Barry – Decca 1341-A (62320) (1937)
- Horace Heidt & his Brigaders; Vocal Chorus by Larry Cotton – Brunswick 7913 (B 21260) (1937)
- Dick Jurgens & His Orchestra; Vocal Chorus by Eddy Howard – (1937–39)
- Roy Fox & His Orchestra; Vocal Chorus by Denny Dennis – HMV (1938)
- Billie Holiday – Music For Torching (1955)
- Julie London – Julie Is Her Name (1955)
- Rita Reys – The Cool Voice of Rita Reys (1956)
- Art Tatum with Ben Webster – The Tatum Group Masterpieces, Volume Eight (1956 – 3 takes on CD issue)
- Doris Day – Day By Day (1957)
- Ahmad Jamal – Complete Live at the Pershing Lounge 1958 (1958)
- Frank Sinatra – Frank Sinatra Sings for Only the Lonely (1958)
- Sarah Vaughan – Vaughan and Violins (1958)
- Andy Williams – Lonely Street (1959)
- Dave Brubeck – Gone with the Wind (1959)
- Anita O'Day – Cool Heat (1959)
- Art Pepper – Intensity (1960)
- Wes Montgomery – The Incredible Jazz Guitar of Wes Montgomery (1960)
- Ella Fitzgerald – Ella in Berlin: Mack the Knife (1960) (reissue 1993)
- Connie Francis – Songs to a Swinging Band (1960)
- Anthony Newley – Love is a Now and Then Thing (1960)
- The Duprees – a single, peaking at No. 89 on the US Hot 100 (1963)
- Morgana King - It's a Quiet Thing (1965)
- Bill Evans – California Here I Come (1967)
- Vic Damone – The Damone Type of Thing (1967)
- Kiri Te Kanawa – Blue Skies (1985)
- Rob Wasserman with Dan Hicks – Duets (1988)
- Sun Ra – Blue Delight (1989)
- Derek Bailey – Ballads (2002)
- NRBQ – Keep This Love Goin' (2011)

== Televised performances ==
- Jim Henson (as Muppet character Guy Smiley) – Sesame Street (1969)
- The Jascha Lombardi Orchestra, on "The Weather Show" – Sesame Street (1972)
- Jim Nabors – The Muppet Show (1976)
