= Obscure Records =

British record label

Obscure Records was a U.K. record label which existed from 1975 to 1978. It was created and curated by Brian Eno. Ten albums were issued in the series. Most have detailed liner notes on their back covers, analyzing the compositions and providing a biography of the composer, in a format typical of classical music albums, and much of the material can be regarded as 20th-century classical music. The label provided a venue for experimental music.

== Discography ==
=== Obscure Records ===
Catalog	Year	Artist(s)	Title	Notes
Obscure no.1	1975	Gavin Bryars	The Sinking of the Titanic	Release also contains Jesus' Blood Never Failed Me Yet, which includes Derek Bailey on guitar and Michael Nyman on organ.
Obscure no.2	1975	Christopher Hobbs, John Adams, Gavin Bryars	Ensemble Pieces	
Obscure no.3	1975	Brian Eno	Discreet Music	Title track (side one) utilizes the tape loop system previously used by Fripp & Eno in (No Pussyfooting) and soon to be known as Frippertronics
Obscure no.4	1975	David Toop, Max Eastley	New and Rediscovered Musical Instruments	David Toop's name appears first on the cover, but his tracks occupy side two. Toop's tracks are incorrectly listed in backward order on both cover and label of Island and Polydor editions. The Virgin CD reissue retains the cover and label order, but adjusts the running order of the tracks on the disc itself to match
Obscure no.5	1976	Jan Steele, John Cage	Voices and Instruments	Features Robert Wyatt singing two tracks
Obscure no.6	1976	Michael Nyman	Decay Music	
Obscure no.7	1976	Members of the Penguin Café Orchestra	Music from the Penguin Café	Lists Simon Jeffes as the artist on the label only, on Island and Polydor editions
Obscure OBS-8	1978	John White, Gavin Bryars	Machine Music	
Obscure OBS-9	1978	an opera by Tom Phillips, music by Gavin Bryars, libretto by Fred Orton	Irma	
Obscure OBS-10	1978	Harold Budd	The Pavilion of Dreams	

== Releases and editions ==
The first seven albums were issued on the Obscure label in 1975 and 1976, manufactured and distributed in the UK by Island Records whose name appeared at the bottom of the label. These have a catalogue number expressed as "Obscure no. 1" through 7 on the covers, or "OBSCURE-1" etc. on the labels. All albums use the original, mostly black, cover art.
