= Solo: Live at Moers Festival =

Live album by Anthony Braxton
- Released: 1976
- Recorded: June 1, 1974
- Venues: Moers Festival in Moers, Germany
- Genre: Jazz
- Length: 32:20
- Labels: Ring Ring 01002; Moers Music 01002
- Producer: Burkhard Hennen

Anthony Braxton chronology
| In the Tradition Volume 2 (1974) | Solo: Live at Moers Festival (1976) | Quartet: Live at Moers Festival (1974) |

Moers Music Cover

Solo: Live at Moers Festival is a live solo album by saxophonist/composer/improviser Anthony Braxton recorded in 1974 at the Third International New Jazz Festival in Moers, the album was originally released on the German Ring label in 1976 and later reissued on the Moers Music label in 1977 .

== Reception ==
The Allmusic review by Brian Olewnick awarded the album 4 stars stating "His obvious and remarkable fluency on alto allows Braxton to command the subtlest shadings as well as the harshest split tones at will. At the end, the dramatic impact of his performance is clear from the overwhelmingly positive and enthusiastic audience reaction".

Professional ratings
Review scores
| Source | Rating |
|---|---|
| Allmusic | 4/5 stars |

== Track listing ==
All compositions by Anthony Braxton.

1. "Composition 26B: JMK-80 CKN-7" - 8:10
2. "Composition 26H: NNWZ 48 K N" - 4:50
3. "Composition 77B: RORRT 33 H7T 4" - 5:18
4. "Composition 26E: AOTH MBA T" - 5:19
5. "Composition 26F: 106 Kelvin M-16" - 5:31
6. "Composition 26G: RZ04M(6) AHW" - 3:12

== Personnel ==
- Anthony Braxton - alto saxophone
