= First Duo Concert =

Live album by Anthony Braxton and Derek Bailey
- Released: 1974
- Recorded: June 30, 1974
- Genre: Jazz
- Length: 77:14
- Label: Emanem
- Producer: Martin Davidson

Anthony Braxton chronology
Quartet: Live at Moers Festival (1974)	First Duo Concert (1974)	Royal Volume 1 (1974)

Derek Bailey chronology
More 74 (1974)	First Duo Concert (1974)	Royal Volume 1 (1974)

First Duo Concert is an album by American jazz saxophonist Anthony Braxton and British guitarist Derek Bailey, recorded in 1974 at the Wigmore Hall in London and released by Emanem.

== Reception ==
The AllMusic review by Steve Loewy stated that the album is "surprisingly accessible, and contrasts two complementary approaches within the free music genre".

Professional ratings
Review scores
Source	Rating
AllMusic	4.5/5 stars
The Penguin Guide to Jazz Recordings	3/4 stars
The Rolling Stone Jazz Record Guide	4/5 stars

== Track listing ==
All compositions by Anthony Braxton and Derek Bailey except as indicated

1. "The First Set - Area 1" – 8:22
2. "The First Set - Area 2" – 3:12
3. "The First Set - Area 3 (Open)" – 8:44
4. "The First Set – Area 4 (Solo)" (Bailey) – 2:43
5. "The First Set – Area 5" – 5:21
6. "The First Set – Area 6" – 6:08
7. "The Second Set – Area 7" – 6:48
8. "The Second Set – Area 8" – 6:23
9. "The Second Set – Area 9 (Solo)" (Braxton) – 5:56
10. "The Second Set – Area 10" – 4:29
11. "The Second Set – Area 11 (Open)" – 15:29
12. "The Second Set – Area 12" – 3:57
  - Recorded at the Wigmore Hall in London on June 30, 1974

== Personnel ==
- Anthony Braxton – soprano saxophone, alto saxophone, soprano clarinet, clarinet, contrabass clarinet, flute
- Derek Bailey – electric guitar, acoustic guitar (tracks 1–8 & 10–12)
