= Terry Day =

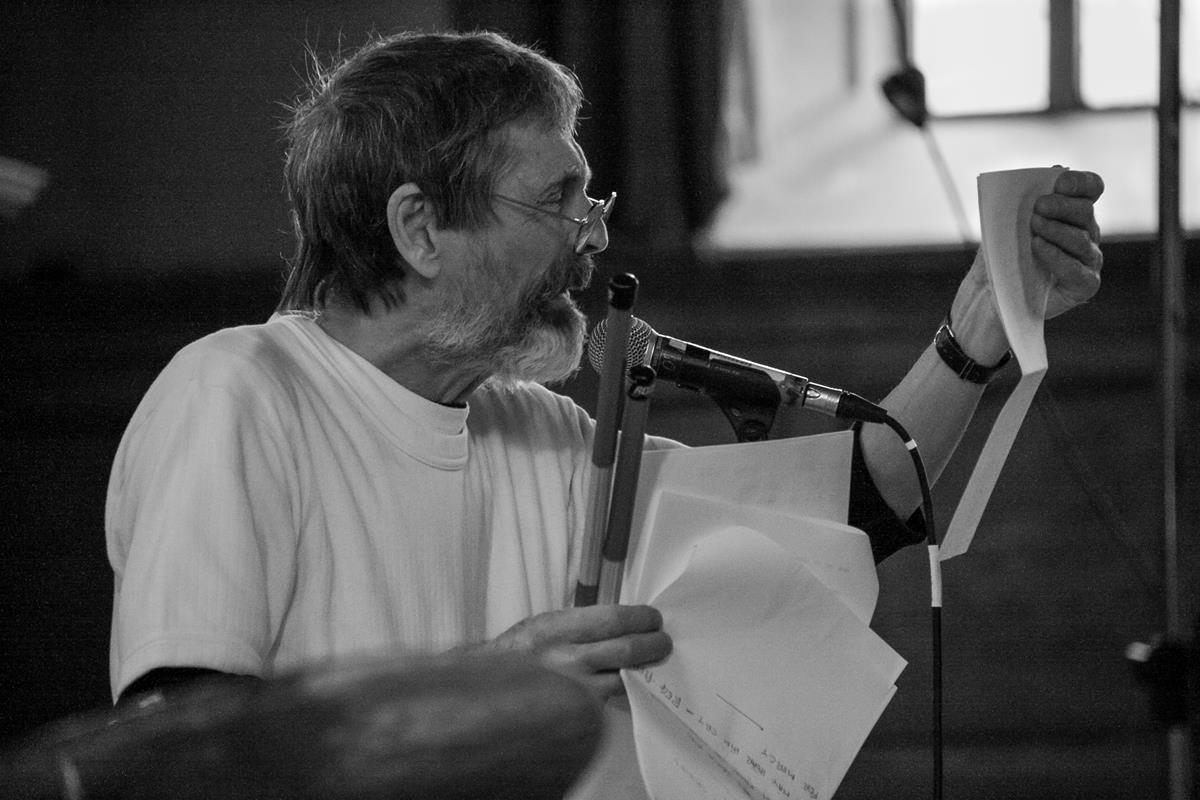

Background information
- Born: Terrence Day; 17 October 1940 (age 85); Hemel Hempstead, Hertfordshire, England
- Genre: Avant-garde jazz
- Occupation: Musician
- Instrument: Multi-instrumentalist
- Formerly of: Alterations
- Website: terryday.co.uk

Terence Day (born 17 October 1940) is a musician specialising in free improvisation, a poet and a visual artist. He is a founding member of the Continuous Music Ensemble and The People Band. Some of his musical partners include Derek Bailey, Steve Beresford, Phil Minton, Evan Parker, Charlotte Hug, John Russell, Rhodri Davis, Misha Mengelberg, Tony Oxley, Marten Altena, Phil Wachsman and John Tchicai. He is a member of the improvising, genre-hopping quartet Alterations, active from 1977 to 1986 and reforming in 2015.

Day is self taught but from a musical family. His father was a drummer and his brother Pat was a child prodigy and played with Graham Bond.

== Discography ==
- Look at Me (Nato, 1987)
- Interurruptions (Emanem, 2006)
- Solos (2016)
- Midnight and Below (Iluso, 2019)
