= Quartet: Live at Moers Festival =

Live album by Anthony Braxton
- Released: 1976
- Recorded: June 2, 1974
- Venue: Moers Festival in Moers, Germany
- Genre: Jazz
- Length: 32:20
- Label: Ring Ring 01010/11; Moers Music momu 01010/11
- Producer: Burkhard Hennen

Anthony Braxton chronology
Solo: Live at Moers Festival (1974)	Quartet: Live at Moers Festival (1976)	First Duo Concert (1974)

Moers Music Cover

Quartet: Live at Moers Festival is a live album by saxophonist/composer/improviser Anthony Braxton's Quartet recorded in 1974 at the Third International New Jazz Festival in Moers and originally released on the German Ring label in 1976 and the Moers Music label in 1977 as a double LP.

Professional ratings
Review scores
Source	Rating
Allmusic	3/5 stars

== Track listing ==
All compositions by Anthony Braxton are graphically titled and the following attempts to translate the title to text.

1. "6-------77--(NJD)--T AR--36K [Composition 23 B]" - 26:23
2. "489M 70-2--(THB) M [Composition 23 E]" - 21:50
3. "84°--KELVIN--M [Composition 40 O] Part I" - 1:42
4. "84°--KELVIN--M [Composition 40 O] Part II" - 9:00
5. "BOR---N-K64 (60)--M 0 H S [Composition 40 M]" - 18:15
6. "F64-- H488 [Composition 23 F]" - 10:08
7. "RBHM-F KNNK [Composition 23 D]" - 10:59

== Personnel ==
- Anthony Braxton - reeds
- Kenny Wheeler - trumpet (tracks 2–7)
- Dave Holland - bass
- Barry Altschul - drums, percussion
