= Ballads (Derek Bailey album) =

Studio album by Derek Bailey
- Released: 23 April 2002
- Length: 41:31
- Label: Tzadik
- Producer: Derek Bailey

Derek Bailey chronology
String Theory (2000)	Ballads (2002)	Pieces for Guitar (2002)

Ballads is a solo studio album by English guitarist Derek Bailey. It was released on 23 April 2002, through Tzadik. In 2007, The Guardian included the album in their list of "1000 Albums to Hear Before You Die".

== Background ==
The album contains Derek Bailey's 14 solo guitar renditions of standard songs. It was recorded by Toby Hrycek-Robinson and mastered by Scott Hull. It was released through John Zorn's American record label Tzadik. Marc Ribot wrote the album's liner notes.

== Critical reception ==
Professional ratings
Review scores
Source	Rating
AllMusic	4.5/5 stars
The Guardian	4/5 stars
Pitchfork	8.1/10

Brian Olewnick of AllMusic stated, "Ballads is stunningly gorgeous, lovely melodies like 'Laura' being passionately stroked even as they abut against Bailey's questioning angularities and brusque, impolite commentary." He added, "Whether one is glad or distressed that he chose to dip his toes into these waters, Ballads is a singularly lovely recording, one that certainly stands out in Bailey's oeuvre and one that is nigh impossible not to smile about and linger over." Dominique Leone of Pitchfork commented that "Bailey's improvisations here are at once impenetrable and immediately familiar." He called the album "a fine entryway to the appreciation of Bailey's art."

In 2007, The Guardian included the album in their list of "1000 Albums to Hear Before You Die".

=== Accolades ===
Year-end lists for Ballads
Publication	List	Rank	Ref.
Pitchfork	Top 50 Albums of 2002	40	
The Wire	2002 Rewind: 50 Records of the Year	—	

== Track listing ==
Ballads track listing
No.	Title	Writer(s)	Length
1.	"Laura"	David Raksin	2:58
2.	"What's New"	Johnny Burke; Robert Haggart	1:40
3.	"When Your Lover Has Gone"	E. A. Swan	3:18
4.	"Stella by Starlight"	Victor Young	7:21
5.	"My Melancholy Baby"	Ernie Burnett	3:13
6.	"My Buddy"	Walter Donaldson	1:13
7.	"Gone with the Wind"	Herbert Magidson; Allie Wrubel	2:07
8.	"Rockin' Chair"	Hoagy Carmichael	1:56
9.	"Body and Soul"	John Green	5:34
10.	"Gone with the Wind"	Magidson; Wrubel	2:29
11.	"Rockin' Chair"	Carmichael	2:04
12.	"You Go to My Head"	J. Fred Coots	1:47
13.	"Georgia on My Mind"	Carmichael	4:58
14.	"Please Don't Talk About Me When I'm Gone"	Sidney Clare; Sam H. Stept; Bee Palmer	0:50
Total length:			41:31

== Personnel ==
Credits adapted from liner notes.

- Derek Bailey – guitar, production
- Toby Hrycek-Robinson – recording
- Scott Hull – mastering
- John Zorn – executive production
- Kazunori Sugiyama – associate production
- Heung-Heung Chin – design
- Marc Ribot – liner notes
