= In the Tradition Volume 2 =

Studio album by Anthony Braxton
- Released: 1976
- Recorded: May 29, 1974
- Studio: Rosenberg Studie, Copenhagen, Denmark
- Genre: Jazz
- Length: 49:20
- Label: SteepleChase SCS 1045
- Producer: Nils Winther

Anthony Braxton chronology
In the Tradition (1974)	In the Tradition Volume 2 (1976)	Solo: Live at Moers Festival (1974)

In the Tradition Volume 2 is an album by American saxophonist and composer Anthony Braxton, recorded in 1974 and released on the Danish SteepleChase label in 1976. The album features Braxton's interpretations of jazz standards and followed the first volume recorded at the same sessions which was released in 1974.

== Reception ==
The AllMusic review by Scott Yanow stated, "Braxton pays tribute to each song's melody before making his abstract improvisations; the rhythm section mostly ignores what he plays. A short 'Duet' (which teams the leader with Pedersen) is a change-of-pace and much freer. These two records are historical curiosities but feature much less interaction between the trio and Anthony Braxton than one would hope".

Professional ratings
Review scores
Source	Rating
AllMusic	1.5/5 stars
The Rolling Stone Jazz Record Guide	3/5 stars

== Track listing ==
1. "What's New?" (Johnny Burke, Bob Haggart) - 9:58
2. "Duet" (Anthony Braxton, Niels-Henning Ørsted Pedersen) - 3:30
3. "Body and Soul" (Frank Eyton, Johnny Green, Edward Heyman, Robert Sour) - 10:17
4. "Marshmallow" (Warne Marsh) - 6:42 Bonus track on CD reissue
5. "Donna Lee" (Charlie Parker) - 6:35
6. "My Funny Valentine" (Lorenz Hart, Richard Rodgers) - 8:07
7. "Half Nelson" (Miles Davis) - 4:15

== Personnel ==
- Anthony Braxton – alto saxophone, contrabass clarinet
- Tete Montoliu - piano
- Niels-Henning Ørsted Pedersen - bass
- Albert “Tootie” Heath - drums
