= In the Tradition (Anthony Braxton album) =

Studio album by Anthony Braxton
- Released: 1974
- Recorded: May 29, 1974
- Studios: Rosenberg Studie, Copenhagen, Denmark
- Genre: Jazz
- Length: 47:23
- Label: SteepleChase SCS 1015
- Producer: Nils Winther

Anthony Braxton chronology
Four Compositions (1973) (1973)	In the Tradition (1974)	In the Tradition Volume 2 (1974)

In the Tradition is an album by American saxophonist and composer Anthony Braxton, recorded in 1974 and released on the Danish SteepleChase label. The album features Braxton's interpretations of jazz standards and was followed by a second volume recorded at the same sessions which was released in 1976. It was originally going to be a Dexter Gordon album, but due to Dexter being ill, Braxton filled in for him.

== Reception ==
The AllMusic review by Scott Yanow stated: "The great avant-gardist Anthony Braxton threw the jazz world a curve with this album. ...A historical curiosity, this set is not as essential as Braxton's explorations of his own music."

Professional ratings
Review scores
Source	Rating
AllMusic	1.5/5 stars
The Encyclopedia of Popular Music	3/5 stars
The Rolling Stone Album Guide	4/5 stars
The Rolling Stone Jazz Record Guide	3/5 stars

== Track listing ==
1. "Marshmallow" (Warne Marsh) – 7:51
2. "Goodbye Pork Pie Hat" (Charles Mingus) – 4:56
3. "Just Friends" (John Klenner, Sam M. Lewis) – 9:50
4. "Ornithology" (Benny Harris, Charlie Parker) – 7:24
5. "Lush Life" (Billy Strayhorn) – 12:02
6. "Trane's Blues" (John Coltrane) – 5:34 Bonus track on CD reissue

== Personnel ==
- Anthony Braxton – alto saxophone, contrabass clarinet
- Tete Montoliu – piano
- Niels-Henning Ørsted Pedersen – bass
- Albert Heath – drums
