= Exotica (book) =

Exotica: Fabricated Soundscapes in a Real World
- Author: David Toop
- Cover artist: Russell Mills
- Language: English
- Publisher: Serpent's Tail
- Publication date: 15 June 1999
- Publication place: UK
- Pages: 256
- ISBN: 978-1-85242-595-1

Exotica: Fabricated Soundscapes in a Real World is a 1999 non-fiction book by David Toop. The work was first published on 15 June 1999 through Serpent's Tail and focuses on the musical genre exotica.

== Synopsis ==
In the book Toop discusses the musical genre of exotica as well as the general listener reaction. He also discusses his personal history with music, as personal tragedies left him feeling that music was trivial in comparison to his own grief. Toop details several recordings and includes interviews with musicians such as Burt Bacharach, Bill Laswell, and the Boo-Yaa T.R.I.B.E.

== Reception ==
Critical reception has been predominantly positive. The A.V. Club reviewed Exotica in 2002 and wrote that "The book is not always successful and sometimes close to incoherent, but it's a daring, unique effort." The Chicago Reader and New Statesman also reviewed the work, and the Chicago Reader commented that "Exotica is less an extension of Toop's worldview than a reiteration of it" but that "Even repeating himself, Toop's a more interesting read than almost anyone else writing about music today."
