= Four Compositions (1973) =

Studio album by Anthony Braxton
- Released: 1977
- Recorded: January 11, 1973; Tokyo, Japan
- Genre: Jazz
- Length: 40:25
- Label: Denon YX-7506-ND
- Producer: Giovanni Bonandrini

Anthony Braxton chronology
Town Hall 1972 (1972)	Four Compositions (1973) (1977)	In the Tradition (1974)

Four Compositions (1973) is an album by American saxophonist and composer Anthony Braxton recorded in Japan in 1973 and originally released on the Japanese Denon label in 1976. The album features Braxton's compositions dedicated to Richard Teitelbaum, Muhal Richard Abrams, Warne Marsh and Laurent Goddet.

== Reception ==
The Allmusic review by Eugene Chadbourne stated "The fact that Braxton had been invited to Japan and had made a superior-quality recording of his own pieces with three good musicians was considered quite important, and it was even assumed by some that the hip Japanese players might have had more success with Braxton's music than some of the squares who were floundering around with it back home and in Europe. ...the skilled and quite creative Japanese musicians confront the dynamic of Braxton. There is a sense of scrambling to some of the forward motion; one imagines Braxton leading the others down a trail that keeps getting steeper and steeper. ...As decades pass, documents such as this are audible pages out of the Braxton diary, memorable moments out of a lifetime of superb musical achievement".

Professional ratings
Review scores
Source	Rating
Allmusic	3/5 stars

== Track listing ==
All compositions by Anthony Braxton.

1. "Composition 23N - Dedicated to Richard Teitelbaum" - 11:35
2. "Composition 23P - Dedicated to Richard Abrams" - 8:25
3. "Composition 23M - Dedicated to Warne Marsh" - 9:55
4. "Composition 23(O) - Dedicated to Laurent Goddet" - 10:30

== Personnel ==
- Anthony Braxton – clarinet, contrabass clarinet, soprano clarinet, flute, sopranino saxophone, alto saxophone
- Masahiko Sato - piano
- Keiki Midorikawa - bass
- Hozumi Tanaka - percussion (tracks 3 & 4)
