= Alterations (band) =

- Genres: Free improvisation
- Years active: 1977–present

Alterations is a four-piece musical group with members David Toop, Peter Cusack, Terry Day, and Steve Beresford. Initially active from 1977 to 1986, the group released three albums and performed widely across the UK and mainland Europe. The group play free improvised music with an emphasis on unusual combinations of different styles. "The group were notorious for genre-plundering humour."

"Formed in 1977 by Cusack, the group reveled in an aura of 'productive friction,' with their interactions being both collective and combative. They thrived on unpredictability and a tension that produced three records."

== Discography (partial) ==
- 1978: Alterations
- 1980: Up Your Sleeve
- 1984: My Favourite Animals
- 2000: Alterations Live
- 2002: Voila Enough!
