= Tania Chen =

- Born: England
- Genres: Free improvisation, sound art
- Occupation: Musician
- Instrument: Piano
- Years active: 1990s – present
- Website: http://www.taniachen.com

Tania Caroline Chen is a composer, improviser, and sound artist utilizing piano and found sounds. She has worked in Northern California, New York, and London. She is known for performing the works of composers such as Cornelius Cardew (Recording), John Cage, Earle Brown (recording), Morton Feldman, Chris Newman, and David Toop David Toop (recording).

She has also collaborated with musicians including improviser and composer Steve Beresford (with whom she recorded 'Ointment'), composer Andrew Poppy (concert), pianist John Tilbury, bassist John Edwards, drummer Mark Sanders and harpist Rhodri Davies. She has also collaborated with the film-maker Jayne Parker.

She has performed throughout the US, UK, Asia and Europe, at venues including Tate Modern, GaleGates (Brooklyn, NYC), The Hamburger Bahnhof Museum (Berlin), the Purcell Room, where she gave a complete performance of John Cage's Music of Changes Books I-IV, and the Fukuoka Asian Art Museum.

Recent concerts include Cornelius Cardew for BBC Radio 3 (Concert program and listing) and a performance of Satie's Vexations for the "Sleep" Installation at the Tate Modern 27 & 28 May 2007, alongside Michael Nyman, Gavin Bryars and Joshua Rifkin.

Originally trained as a classical pianist, she studied (amongst others) with Stephen Coombs, Professor at the Guildhall School of Music and Drama, as well as taking masterclasses with Artur Pizarro. Her piano career took a turn towards contemporary music in the late 1990s, when she studied with noted pianist John Tilbury, and became noted for her performances of composers such as John Cage and Morton Feldman, amongst others. She was subsequently awarded an M(Mus) at Goldsmiths College, University of London, with distinction. During this time she also took part in a masterclass with Mstislav Rostropovich(link).

== Partial discography ==
- Cornelius Cardew - chamber music 1955-1964
- Earl Brown Chamber Music
- 'Ointment', Review
