= Marie Yates =

British fine conceptual artist (born 1940)

- Born: 1940 (age 85–86); Leigh, Lancashire, England
- Education: Manchester Regional College of Art 1957-59, Fine Art at Hornsey College of Art 1968-1971, University College London 1977-78, Goldsmiths College of Art 1979-81
- Occupations: Fine Artist & Professor
- Years active: 1960s - present
- Known for: Conceptual art, Feminist art
- Website: marieyates.org.uk

Marie Yates (born 1940) is a British fine conceptual artist whose artwork centers on addressing female representation and sexual difference in media and society. She was mentored by John Latham and exhibited alongside The Artist Placement Group. She is best known for her landscape works combining installation, text and imagery.

== Life and education ==
Yates graduated from Manchester Regional College of Art in 1959. She also pursued Degrees in Fine Art at Hornsey College of Art(1968-1971) and The Royal College of Art (1971-1973). She also studied Social Anthropology at University College London (1977/8), and earned her master's degree in Fine Art from Goldsmiths College of Art in 1981. In 1989 Yates received a Master of Arts Degree from the University of Derby in Photographic Studies.

Marie Yates' artistic career began in the late 1960s, creating abstract paintings in her studio in Cornwall. Throughout the 70's the artist turned to the Conceptual art movement and became known for her incorporation of landscape images and text to her works.

She began teaching fine art and photography in 1971 at a variety of major art colleges in the United Kingdom, including The Royal College of Art, Chelsea College of Arts, and University of the Arts London. She retired from teaching in 1991 and left England to live in Greece that same year, where she has lived since.

== Career ==
Yates started off as an abstract painter in the 1960s, working in her own studio in St. Ives Cornwall. she began to expand her explorations in media with digital techniques.

By the 1990s, Yates' work was being exhibited throughout England, taking a part in many major galleries such as Riverside Studios and the Institute of Contemporary Arts (ICA, London). She also participated in a number of exhibitions in the US and Europe, including the New Museum. Her works are in the collections of Tate, Arts Council, and The British Council.

In recent years, Yates' work has enjoyed renewed interest. In 2016, she had her first exhibition in a private gallery in London, in a series of exhibitions featuring British conceptual art from the period 1956-1979 and, in 2018, her work was included in two group shows in London. In 2022, Yates' 1984 work The Only Woman, which reflected on the death of her mother, was exhibited at Tate Britain in London.

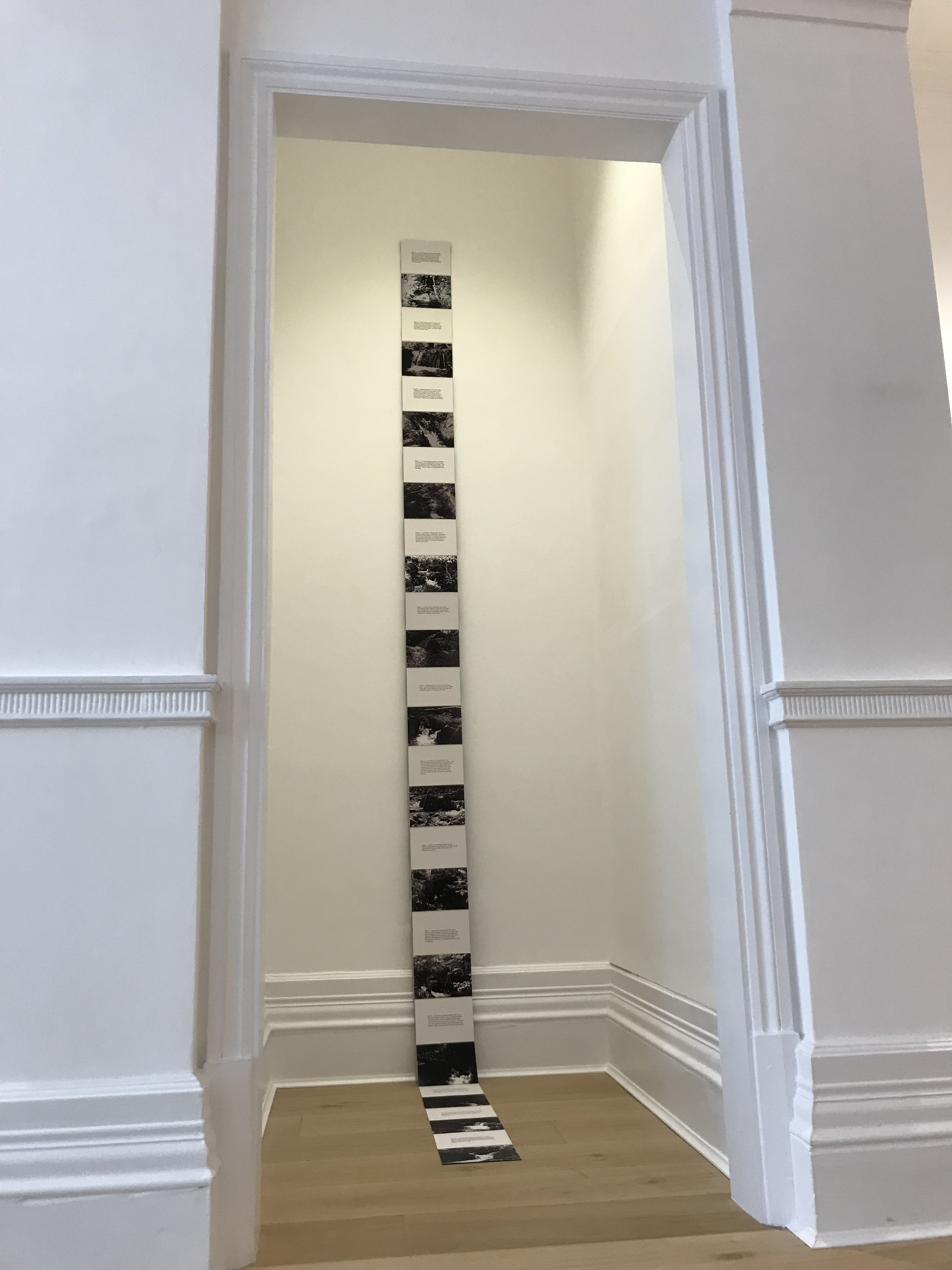
A 1975 work of art by British artist Marie Yates consisting of 28 black and white interconnected images and texts

== Selected exhibitions ==
- The Only Woman. 2022, Tate Britain, London
- AKTION: Conceptual Art and Photography (1960 - 1980). 2018, Richard Saltoun Gallery, London
- Resolution is not the point. 2017, Photo50, curated by Hemera Collective, London Art Fair
- Some Dimensions of my Lunch: Conceptual Art in Britain Part 2: Marie Yates. 2016, Richard Saltoun Gallery, London
- The sun went in, the fire went out, 2016, Chelsea Space, London.
- Vigilance: An Exhibition of Artists Books, 2014 Artists Space, New York
- TAPS: Paul Burwell, 2010 Matts Gallery, London
- Other Than Itself, 1989/91
- Image in Trouble, 1984, The Pavilion Gallery Leeds
- Marie Yates: The Field Workings - Arnolfini Gallery, 1973, Bristol
