= Max Eastley =

British visual and sound artist

Max Eastley (born 1 December 1944, Torquay, Devon, England) is a British visual and sound artist. He is part of the Cape Farewell Climate Change project. He studied painting and graphic art at Newton Abbot Art School and then went on to gain a BA in Fine Art (1969–1972) at Middlesex University (formerly Hornsey School of Art). He is a sculptor (kinetic), musician and composer. His primary instrument is a unique electro-acoustic monochord, developed from an aeolian sculpture. 'The Arc' consists of a single string stretched lengthwise across a long piece of wood (around ten feet) which can be played with a bow, fingers or short glass rods. The end of the instrument has a microphone attached so the basic sound can be amplified, recorded and run through sound effect programs.

Eastley has collaborated with many different artists and musicians on performances, installations and recordings including: David Toop, Brian Eno, Paul Burwell, Victor Gama, Hugh Davies, Steve Beresford, Peter Greenaway, Dave Hunt, David Buckland, Evan Parker, Peter Cusack, and Spaceheads. From 2001–2002, Eastley was a visiting fellow at John Moores University Liverpool and is currently (2010 onwards) an AHRC research fellow at Oxford Brookes University researching Aeolian phenomena. On 17 May 1989, Eastley was awarded a prize in the 'Learning Spaces Category' of the working in the City European Communities Architectural Ideas Competition (University College Dublin).

== Selected discography ==
Eastley has worked across a variety of genres including: improvised and experimental music; folk music; popular song; jazz; compositions using environmental recordings as well as musical resources. He has also composed music for film and dance. Eastley was part of the group 'The 49 Americans', who played together for a period during the 1980s and produced several albums together.

- 'New and Rediscovered Musical Instruments' with David Toop, produced by Brian Eno (Obscure) – 1975
- 'Circadian Rhythm' with Paul Burwell, Hugh Davies, Paul Lovens, Paul Lytton, Annabel Nicolson, Evan Parker and David Toop (Incus Records) – 1978
- 'Whirled Music' with Steve Beresford, Paul Burwell and David Toop (Quartz) – 1980
- 'My Heart's in Motion' (Nato) – 1985
- 'At Close Quarters' Various artists (These Records) – 1993
- 'Buried Dreams' with David Toop (Beyond) – 1994
- 'Isolationism' Various artists (Virgin) – 1994
- 'Day for Night' with Peter Cusack – 2001
- 'The Time of the Ancient Astronaut' with the Spaceheads (Bip Hop) – 2001
- 'Doll Creature' with David Toop (Bip Hop) – 2004
- 'Hydrophony for Dagon' with Michael Prime (Absurd) – 2006
- 'Songs of Transformation' with Martyn Bates (Musica Maxima Magnetica) – 2007
- 'ARCTIC' produced by David Buckland/Cape Farewell – 2007
- 'A Very Long Way from Anywhere Else' with the Spaceheads (Bip Hop) – 2007
- 'A Life Saved by a Spider and Two Doves' with Graham Halliwell, Evan Parker and Mark Wastell (Another Timbre) – 2008
- 'Dark Architecture' (Another Timbre) – 2009
- 'Max Eastley Installation Recordings 1973–2008'

== Selected performances ==
Eastley has performed as a solo musician and in many combinations with other artists. He has worked on stage with his installations and with film and has created and performed in musical/theatrical performances such as: 'Whirled Music'.

- Ars Electronica, 1990 – Performance of Whirled Music
- Xebec Hall, 1993 – Duo played with David Toop using invented experimental instruments
- Purcell Room, South Bank, 1995 – Duo with David Toop
- Museum of Modern Art, Berne, Switzerland, 1996 – Duo with David Toop
- Impakt Festival, Utrecht, Holland, 1996 – Solo performance
- ICA London, 1997 – Quartet with Thomas Koner, Peter Cusack and Alquima
- Lanzarote Music and Visual Art Festival, 1998 – Trio with David Toop and Pete Lockett
- Volksbühne Theatre, Berlin, 1999 – Duo with Thomas Koner
- Mimi Festival, Marseille, 2002 – Performance with The Spaceheads
- Xtract Sculpture Musicale, Podewil, Berlin, 2003 – Duo with David Toop
- Paradiso Amsterdam, 2003 – Solo performance
- ICA London, 2003 – Duo with Victor Gama
- Atlantic Waves, 2006 – Quartet with Thomas Koner, Asmus Tietchens and Victor Gama at The Barbican
- ARCTIC at the Hamburg Planetarium, 2007 – Film installation by David Buckland, music by Max Eastley
- 'Sprawl', Various locations, 2007 – Tour with Thomas Koner playing Amsterdam, London, Bristol and Berlin
- Signal Festival, Sardinia, 2007 – Solo performance
- Millennium Park Chicago, 2007 – Solo performance by Max (for Cape Farewell) with film by David Buckland
- Fete Quaqua Festival of Improvised Music, The Vortex, London, 2008 – Improvised performance with various artists
- Le Weekend Sterlings No Limit Music Festival, 2008 – Quartet with Marc Wastell, Graham Halliwell, Evan Parker
- Rays Jazz, London, 2008 – Trio with Nancy Ruffer and Lol Coxhill
- Late at the Tate, Tate Britain, London, 2009 – Performance for Cape Farewell with Robyn Hitchcock, KT Tunstall and Shlomo
- Nuemusic Und Kunste Festival, Darmstadt, Germany, 2009 – Trio with Volker Staub and Michael Weilacher
- Nobel Laureate Symposium, Science Museum, London, 2009 – Solo performance
- Pestival Festival, Queen Elizabeth Hall, South Bank, London, 2009 – With Robyn Hitchcock and various artists
- Cape Farewell at Rome Film Festival, 2009 – Duo with Jarvis Cocker
- The Spinning Top at The Barbican, London, 2009 – Performance with Graham Coxon, Martin Carthy, Robyn Hitchcock and Natasha Marsh

== Selected installations and exhibitions ==
Eastley has done a wide variety of installations worldwide, many of which use moving parts (motors, pulleys etc.) to create ambient soundscapes while engaging the observer visually. Many recordings of the below installations appear on the CD: 'Max Eastley Installation Recordings 1973–2008'

- Serpentine Gallery, 1976
- Ikon Gallery, Birmingham 1979
- Arnolfini gallery, Bristol 1980
- Apollo House, Eindhoven, Holland 1980
- A Noise in Your Eye (touring exhibition), Arnolfini gallery, the Barbican 1986
- Artec Biennale, Ngoya, Japan 1993
- Ireland and Europe Sculpture Event, Iveagh Gardens, Dublin 1997
- Sculpture in Woodland, County Wicklow, Ireland 1999
- The Big Chill Festival, 2000
- ICC Centre, Japan 2000
- Festival de Arte Sonoro, Mexico 2002
- Interior Landscape, Reading Hindu Temple and Community Association 2003
- European Capital of Culture, Cork, Ireland
- Kinetic Drawings, Metropole Gallery, Folkestone UK, 2008

== Installations for Cape Farewell ==
Eastley collaborated with sound engineer Dave Hunt to develop an innovative computer-controlled amplification system for these installations. Eastley has been part of the Cape Farewell project since 2005 and has been on three trips to Spitsbergen with the organisation. Sound clip of bearded seals

- Ice Garden (Cape Farewell Climate Change), Oxford 2005
- Eden Project, 2009

The following installations were part of a touring exhibition:

- Natural History Museum, London, 2006
- Liverpool Biennial, 2006
- Kampnagel Cultural Centre, Hamburg, 2007
- Madrid, 2008

== Publications featured in ==
Eastley has appeared in several publications since the 1970s, including:

- 'Sonourgy', published by Exeter College of Art 1974
- 'New and Rediscovered Musical Instruments', published by Quartz 1975
- 'Echo: The Images of Sound', published by Het Apollohuis 1987
- 'Grove's Dictionary of Music',
- 'Experimental Musical Instruments Vol. V #2' 1989
- 'Bijutsu Techo' No.678 Vol.45, 1994
- 'Site of Sound ', published by Errant Bodies 1999
- 'ICC Catalogue Magazine', Tokyo, 28 January 2000 Issue
- 'Leonardo Music Journal' 2001
- 'Burning Ice' (Cape Farewell catalogue) 2006
- 'The Fundamentals of Sonic Art and Sound Design', published by AVA Academia 2007
- 'Klangräume der Kunst', 2010
- 'The Wire Magazine', Issue No. 265 March 2006, Issue No. 291 May 2008

== Film, radio and dance ==
=== Film ===
- 'Water Wrackets', film by Peter Greenaway, music by Max Eastley – 1978
- 'Clocks of the Midnight Hours', the work of Max Eastley directed by Simon Reynell, Channel 4 TV/Arts Council Great Britain – 1989
- 'Art from a Changing Arctic', Produced by Cape Farewell, directed by David Hinton – 2005
- 'Kinetic Drawings', Film by Helen Petts of the exhibition at the Metropole Gallery, Folkestone – 2008
- 'Piper of Invisible Fires', Film by Helen Petts and Max Eastley at Dilston Grove, London – 2010

=== Radio ===
- Jarvis Cocker's Sunday Service, Interview on Radio 6 – 2010
- Late Junction on BBC Radio 3, Fiona Talkington featuring Max Eastley's installations, Late Junction on Radio 3 – 2010
- Various programs on Resonance FM

=== Dance ===
Eastley composed music for the Siobhan Davies Production: 'Plants and Ghosts' in 2002.

== Reviews ==
- Review on the BBC of 'Doll Creature'
- Review on Intuitive Music website of 'Doll Creature'
- Review on Boomkat of 'A Very Long Way From Anywhere Else'
- Various reviews of 'A Life Saved By A Spider And Two Doves', with Graham Halliwell, Evan Parker and Mark Wastell on Another Timbre website
- Various reviews of 'Dark Architecture' with Rhodri Davies on Another Timbre website
- Description and review of Max Eastley's installation recordings on the Paradigm Discs website
