= Mirakle =

Studio album by Derek Bailey, Jamaaladeen Tacuma, and Calvin Weston
- Released: 2000
- Recorded: November 29, 1999
- Studios: Orange Music, West Orange, New Jersey
- Genres: Free improvisation, free funk
- Length: 1:10:45
- Labels: Tzadik; TZ 7603

Derek Bailey chronology
String Theory (2000)	Mirakle (2000)	Songs (2000)

Mirakle is an album by guitarist Derek Bailey, electric bassist Jamaaladeen Tacuma, and drummer Calvin Weston. It was recorded on November 29, 1999, at Orange Music in West Orange, New Jersey, and was released in 2000 by Tzadik Records as part of their Key Series.

== Reception ==
Professional ratings
Review scores
Source	Rating
AllMusic	4.5/5 stars
The Penguin Guide to Jazz	3/4 stars
The Encyclopedia of Popular Music	3/5 stars

In a review for AllMusic, Sean Westergaard wrote: "No one compromises their individual sound or strengths, but each is a good enough listener and improviser to make things happen as a group. Weston and Tacuma lay it down super funky, while Derek Bailey does his thing over the top, and it works! Who says the avant-garde can't be a rocking good time?"

The authors of The Penguin Guide to Jazz Recordings called the album "wallopingly unexpected," and stated that Bailey "refuses to hook his usual claim on radical freedom on to fixed energy lines. The guitarist skates ahead of his companions, often playing with flashing speed, but equally often delivering sounds that have no reference to context."

Mark Corroto of All About Jazz commented: "this record is a great portal to Bailey’s music... His anti-groove, anti-swing, anti-harmonies persist, but are they influenced by or do they influence the funk? The answer is both."

Author Todd S. Jenkins remarked: "The guitarist is still his own man but has a ton of fun with the rhythmists' mighty grooves. Perhaps this serves as another confirmation of the harmolodic concept's universality as preached by [Ornette] Coleman."

Ben Watson, writing for High Fidelity News and Record Review called the line-up "a shock," and wrote: "Bailey improvises with vehemence and raw passion, upsetting a funk that is designed to thrive on upset... Who says No Wave hasn't a future? Hey, Derek, let's funk!"

Writing for Something Else!, Mark Saleski stated: "I'd be the first person to admit that this recording is not for everyone. Derek Bailey's guitar style... still requires some time to 'get.' In fact, you may never 'get' it. If you do though, a whole new musical landscape will open up for further exploration."

The editors of The Wire included the album in their year-end "Rewind" listing the year's top recordings.

== Track listing ==
1. "Moment" – 16:35
2. "What It Is" – 9:01
3. "This Time" – 16:00
4. "Nebeula" – 8:53
5. "Present" – 12:26
6. "S'now" – 7:50

== Personnel ==
- Derek Bailey – guitar
- Jamaaladeen Tacuma – bass guitar
- Calvin Weston – drums
