= David Toop =

English musician, author, curator, and emeritus professor

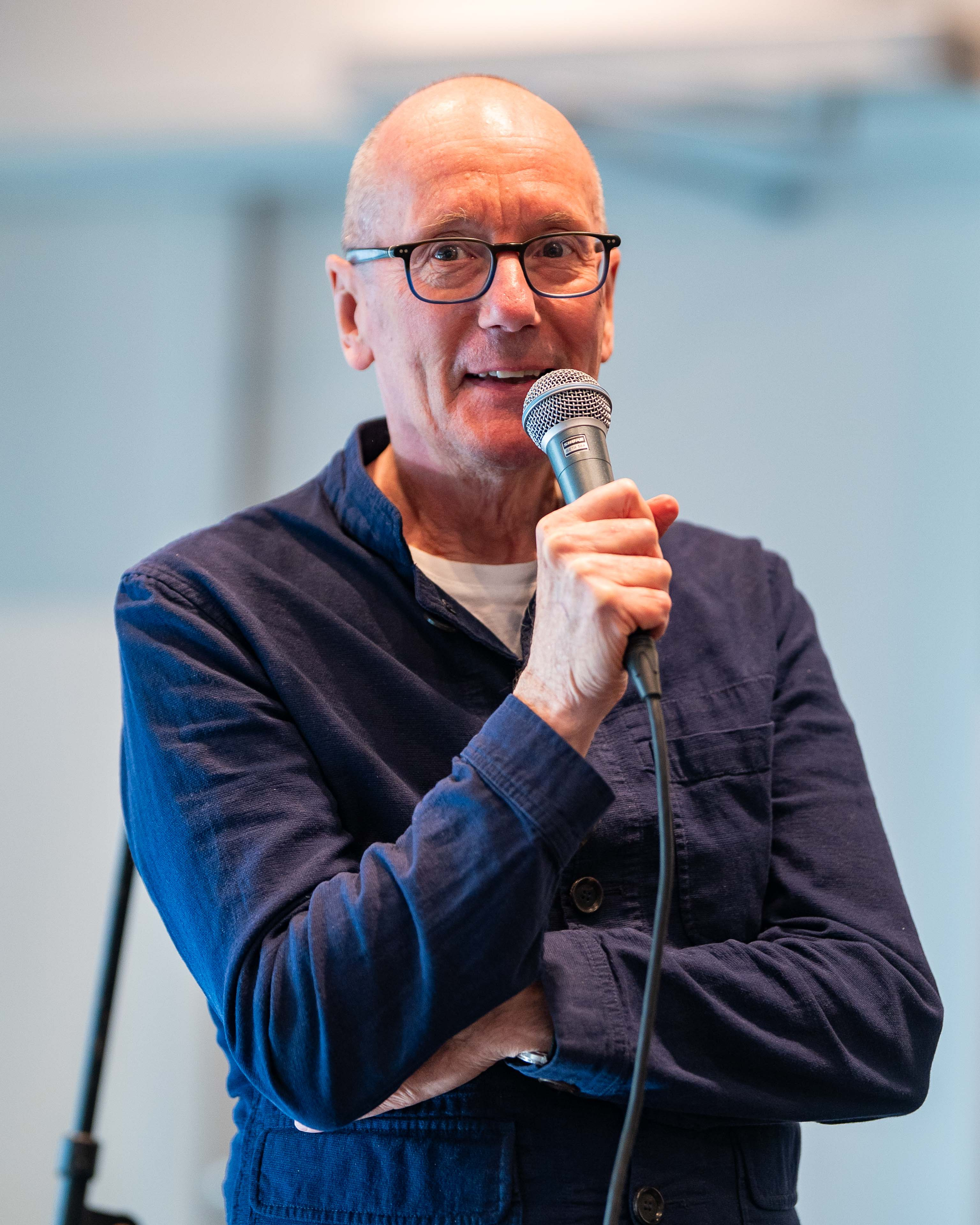
- Toop at Punktfestivalen 2025

Background information
- Born: 5 May 1949 (age 77); Enfield, England
- Genres: Ambient; experimental; free improvisation
- Occupations: Author; musician; college professor; curator
- Instruments: Guitar; flute; electronics
- Years active: 1970–present
- Labels: Obscure Records; Virgin; Sub Rosa; Samadhi Sound; Home Normal; ROOM40; Audika
- Website: davidtoopblog.com

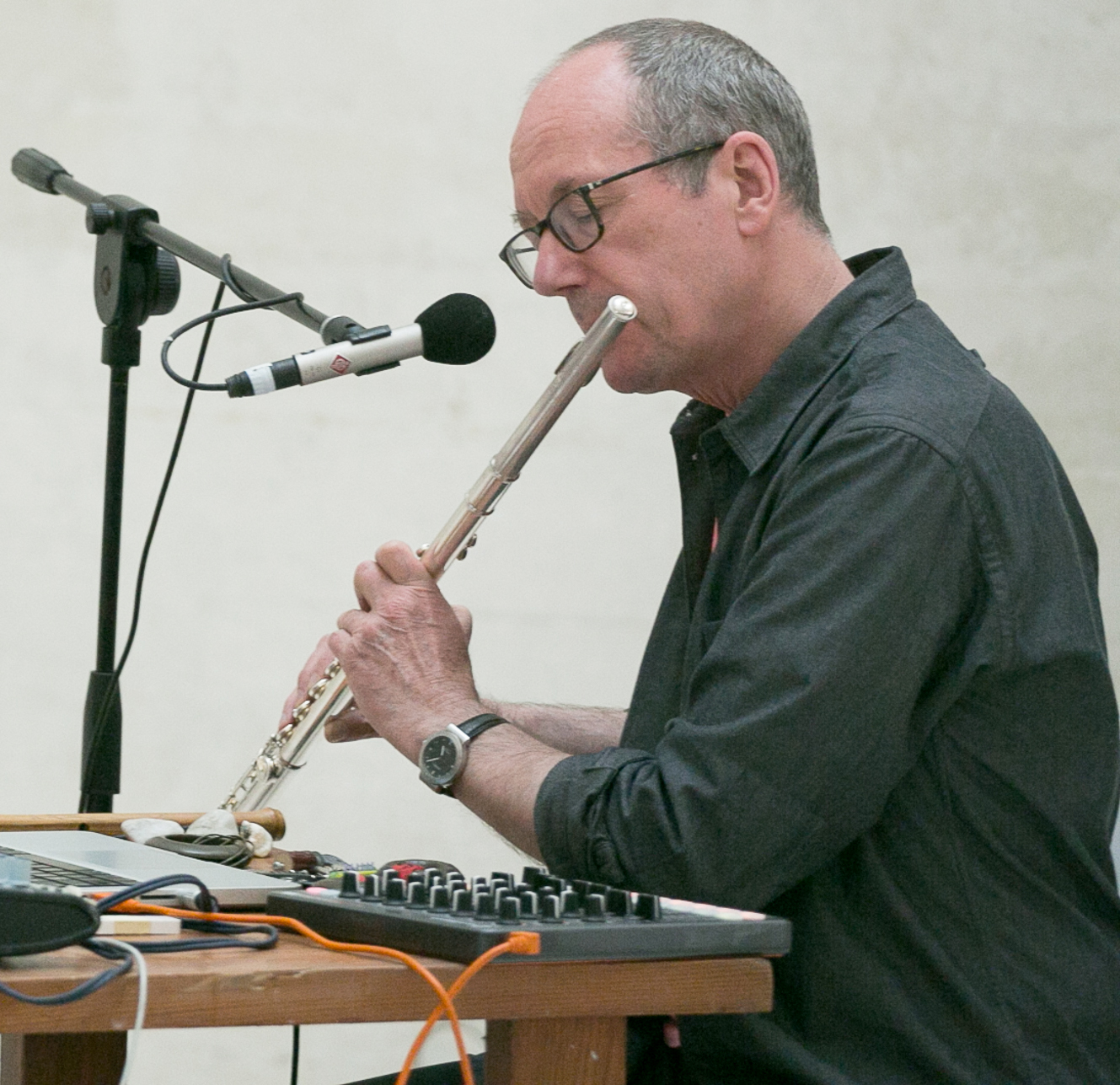
Toop in 2015 performing at the Venice Biennale

David Toop (born 5 May 1949) is an English musician, author, curator, sound artist, and academic, widely known for his work on improvisation, sound culture, and listening practices. He was a long-standing contributor to The Wire and The Face, and a member of the British new wave band The Flying Lizards.

He has been active across experimental music, sound art, ethnography, and writing for more than five decades. Toop has performed on a wide array of instruments and sound-making devices, authored influential books on sound and popular music, and held senior academic appointments at the University of the Arts London (UAL). He is Emeritus Professor at the London College of Communication (LCC).

== Early life and education ==
Soon after Toop's birth, his parents moved to Waltham Cross, Hertfordshire, where he grew up. He was educated at Broxbourne Grammar School, which he left in 1967 to study at Hornsey College of Art and Watford School of Art.

== Academic career ==
Since 1974, Toop has been a visiting lecturer at art schools, universities, and conservatoires internationally. From 2000 to 2005 he served as Research Fellow at the London College of Communication and subsequently held an AHRC Research Fellowship in the Creative and Performing Arts (2005–2007) for a project examining digital technology’s impact on contemporary music and improvised performance.

He was Visiting Professor at the University of the Arts London from 2005 to 2012 and Visiting Professor at Leeds College of Music from 2012 onward. Toop was appointed Professor at UAL in 2013, serving as Chair and later Professor of Audio Culture and Improvisation between 2013 and 2021. He became Emeritus Professor at LCC following his retirement.

Toop has supervised six PhDs and one MPhil, and has examined doctoral dissertations at numerous institutions including Royal Holloway, Cork School of Music, Brunel University, Edinburgh School of Art, Middlesex University, Birmingham Conservatoire, the Academie of Creative and Performing Arts (The Hague), University of the Arts London, Edinburgh University, QUT Brisbane, University of Huddersfield, De Montfort University, the Royal College of Art, and Glasgow School of Art.

Toop has delivered lectures and presentations at many major British institutions, including Tate Modern, Tate Britain, Tate St Ives, the British Museum, the Victoria & Albert Museum, the Science Museum, the Royal Academy, the Barbican, the Serpentine Gallery, Camden Arts Centre, the British Library, Nottingham Contemporary, the Pitt Rivers Museum, the Whitechapel Gallery, Arnolfini, and Ikon Gallery.

=== Musical and artistic work ===
After playing guitar in R&B bands as a teenager, Toop entered London’s nascent improvisation scene in the early 1970s, participating in the pioneering workshops led by jazz drummer John Stevens. He began performing with musicians such as Paul Burwell, Max Eastley, Hugh Davies, Steve Beresford, Terry Day, Peter Cusack, Georgina Born, Sally Potter and Lol Coxhill. His collaborations extended to artists and performers including Marie Yates, Stephen Cripps, John Latham, Bob Cobbing, Carlyle Reedy, Mitsutaka Ishii, and Steven Berkoff.

Toop also engaged in early research on ethnomusicology, bioacoustics, shamanism, sacred languages, and ritual sound. He curated several BBC Radio 3 programmes in the 1970s and worked with the Artist Placement Group, including a 1975 placement at the London Zoo.

In 1978 he travelled to the Venezuelan Amazon to record Yanomami shamanistic ceremonies, resulting in releases such as Hekura (1980) and Lost Shadows (2013). In 1979 he founded the Quartz label, issuing rare ethnographic and experimental music recordings alongside new work by British improvisers.

His 1975 album New and Rediscovered Musical Instruments (with Max Eastley) was one of the first four releases on Brian Eno’s Obscure label, now regarded as a landmark in British experimental music.

In 1980, Toop played flute on the Prince Far I-Roots Radics’ Earl "Chinna" Smith Channel One Studios album, Cry Tuff Dub Encounter Chapter 3. He was also co-editor and publisher of Collusion magazine from 1981 to 1984 and contributed to Channel 4’s Chasing Rainbows series (1984–86). In 1979, Toop made a notable pop-cultural appearance on Top of the Pops with The Flying Lizards.

He is a member of the improvising, genre-hopping quartet Alterations, active from 1977 to 1986 and reforming in 2015.

In 2000, Toop curated the sound art exhibition Sonic Boom, and the following year, he curated a 2-CD collection entitled Not Necessarily English Music: A Collection of Experimental Music from Great Britain, 1960–1977. More experimentally, Toop has also actively engaged with 'sounding objects' from a range of museums. His opera Star-shaped Biscuit was performed as a Faster Than Sound Project at Aldeburgh in 2012.

In recent years, Toop has continued an active collaborative practice, working with Ryuichi Sakamoto, Akio Suzuki, Lawrence English, John Butcher, Sharon Gal, and others, producing recordings that combine field recording, improvisation, and environmental sound.

=== Writing and criticism ===
Since 1983, Toop has been an influential voice in music journalism and cultural criticism. He has written for The Wire, The Face, The Guardian, The Observer, The Times, The Sunday Times, Bookforum, Vogue, Spin, Interview, Pitchfork, Mojo, Billboard, The Independent, Village Voice, New York Times, Libération, and others.

His book Rap Attack (1984) was the second book ever published on hip hop, tracing the music’s roots from Africa and the Caribbean to New York. It has since appeared in multiple expanded editions and is widely cited as foundational hip-hop scholarship.

His later book Ocean of Sound (1995), exploring ambient music, listening, and imaginary worlds, remains in print and continues to sell internationally, influencing writing on sound art, electronic music, and auditory culture.

In August 2025, Toop co-authored the article “Against the Grain: David Toop and Ania Psenitsnikova on moving beyond music and dance” with performance artist Ania Psenitsnikova for The Wire (issue 499). The article accompanied work by their collaborative duo Moreskinsound and articulated a shared position that conventional categories such as music and dance can constrain how sound, movement, and embodiment are perceived.

Drawing on ecological listening, ritual performance, and embodied practice, the article framed listening as a way of entering and leaving spaces without trace, contrasting human temporality with geological and environmental time. The text combined poetic reflection with theoretical references, including writings on time, perception, and the body, and was illustrated with documentation of a Moreskinsound performance in Cornwall (2023) photographed by Toop.

This collaboration reflects Toop’s later-career shift toward interdisciplinary performance practices that merge sound art, improvisation, writing, and ritual action, extending themes previously explored in his books Sinister Resonance, Flutter Echo, and Inflamed Invisible.

== Bibliography ==
- Rap Attack: African Jive to New York Hip Hop (1984) ISBN 0-89608-238-5 – republished with additional chapters as
  - Rap Attack 2: African Rap To Global Hip Hop (1992) ISBN 1-85242-243-2
  - Rap Attack 3 (2000) ISBN 1-85242-627-6
- Ocean of Sound: Aether Talk, Ambient Sound and Imaginary Worlds (1995) ISBN 1-85242-743-4
- Exotica: Fabricated Soundscapes in a Real World (1999) ISBN 1-85242-595-4
- Sonic Boom: The Art of Sound (2000) ISBN 1-85332-208-3 – exhibition catalogue
- Haunted Weather: Music, Silence, and Memory (2004) ISBN 1-85242-812-0
- Sinister Resonance: The Mediumship of the Listener (2010) ISBN 1-4411-4972-4
- Into the Maelstrom: Music, Improvisation and the Dream of Freedom, Before 1970 (2016) ISBN 978-1-6289-2769-6
- Flutter Echo (2017) in Japanese ISBN 978-4866470115
- Flutter Echo (2019) in English ISBN 978-1-78760-152-9
- Inflamed Invisible: Collected Writings on Art and Sound 1976-2018 (2019) ISBN 9781912685165
- Two-Headed Doctor: Listening For Ghosts in Dr. John's Gris-Gris (2024) ISBN 978-1913689605

== Discography ==
=== Solo and collaborations ===
- 1975 – New and Rediscovered Musical Instruments (with Max Eastley)
- 1979 – Wounds (with Paul Burwell)
- 1980 – Whirled Music (with Max Eastley, Paul Burwell, Steve Beresford)
- 1994 – Buried Dreams (with Max Eastley)
- 1995 – Ancient Lights and the Blackcore (with Scorn, Seefeel, Timothy Leary/Dj Ched I Sabbah)
- 1995 – Screen Ceremonies
- 1996 – Pink Noir
- 1997 – Spirit World
- 1999 – Hot Pants Idol
- 1999 – Museum of Fruit
- 2000 – Needle in the Groove (with Jeff Noon)
- 2003 – Black Chamber
- 2003 – Breath-Taking (with Akio Suzuki)
- 2004 – 37th Floor at Sunset
- 2004 – Doll Creature (with Max Eastley)
- 2007 – Sound Body
- 2010 – Wunderkammern (with Rhodri Davies and Lee Patterson)
- 2013 – Lost Shadows: In Defence Of The Soul (Yanomami Shamanism, Songs, Ritual)
- 2015 – The Myriad Creatures will be Transformed of their own accord
- 2016 – Entities Inertias Faint Beings
- 2017 – Dirty Songs Play Dirty Songs
- 2020 – Apparition Paintings
- 2020 – Field Recordings and Fox Spirits
- 2020 – On White, Indigo and Lamp Black (with Avsluta)
- 2021 – Until the Night Melts Away (with John Butcher and Sharon Gal)
- 2021 – Garden of Shadows And Light (with Ryuichi Sakamoto)
- 2021 – Breathing Spirit Forms (with Akio Suzuki and Lawrence English)
- 2021 – Until the Night Melts Away (with John Butcher and Sharon Gal)
- 2021 – Garden of Shadows and Light (with Ryuichi Sakamoto)
- 2021 – Compound Full of Bones, Translucent Thousands (with Jan Bang and Mark Wastell)
- 2023 – The Shell That Speaks the Sea (with Lawrence English)
- 2023 – Thought Forms (with Tania Caroline Chen)
- 2023 – Alterations
- 2024 – Music for Voilà (with Rie Nakajima)
- 2024 – Wunderkammer (with Jan Bang, Xavier Charles, Jean-Marc Duch, Jean-Luc Guionnet, and Mark Wastell)
- 2024 – Moth Wings Beating Air Incised (with Ecka Mordecai and Christian Kobi)
- 2025 – And I Entered into Sleep (with Sergio Armaroli)
- 2025 – Is Spring a Sculpture? (with Rie Nakajima)

=== Curated albums ===
- Ocean of Sound (1996) – (2-CD set intended to accompany his book)
- Crooning on Venus (1996)
- Sugar & Poison: Tru-Life Soul Ballads for Sentients, Cynics, Sex Machines & Sybarites (1996)
- Booming on Pluto: Electro for Droids (1997)
- Guitars on Mars (1997)
- Sonic Boom: The Art of Sound (2000) – (2-CD set accompanying exhibition catalog)
- Not Necessarily "English Music" (2001)
- Haunted Weather : Music, Silence, and Memory (2004) – (2-CD set intended to accompany his book)
