= Harras =

Live album by Derek Bailey, John Zorn & William Parker
- Released: January 30, 1996
- Recorded: 1993
- Venue: Knitting Factory, New York City
- Genre: Avant-garde jazz
- Length: 57:34
- Label: Avant
- Producer: Derek Bailey & John Zorn

John Zorn chronology
Masada: Vav (1995)	Harras (1996)	John Zorn's Cobra: Tokyo Operations '94 (1995)

Harras is an album of improvised music by Derek Bailey, John Zorn & William Parker. The album was released by the Japanese Avant label in 1996. Towards the end of the track "Evening Harras" there is 10 minutes of silence followed by a Bailey solo. "According to Derek Bailey, the abrupt cutoff was planned. Derek wanted to end it "on a high". The Bailey solo material appended after the silence was apparently Zorn's idea."

== Reception ==
The Allmusic review by Dean McFarlane awarded the album 3 stars stating "Evidently the candid session that took place on a night in New York resulted in a chaotic collision of ideas. With the performers being such strong voices individually, the abundant ideas fly in and out of the picture with no apparent regard to form; the session evolves from tepid beginnings into a no-holds-barred, rapid-fire assault on the senses. Fans of ultra-high-energy free improvisation will find it a delight to hear these three masters sparring on this one-off collaboration, making Harras a vital historical document which requires the gumption of a hardened avant-garde music fan to take the whole recording in one listen".

Professional ratings
Review scores
Source	Rating
Allmusic	3/5 stars
The Penguin Guide to Jazz Recordings	3.5/4 stars

== Track listing ==
All compositions by Bailey/Parker/Zorn

1. "Morning Harras" – 12:35
2. "Noon Harras" – 8:59
3. "Evening Harras" – 36:00

== Personnel ==
- Derek Bailey – guitar
- John Zorn – alto saxophone
- William Parker – bass
