= Company (free improvisation group) =

- Genre: Free improvisation
- Years active: 1968–present
- Label: Incus

Company is a collection of free improvising musicians. The concept was devised by guitarist Derek Bailey, in order to create challenging and artistically stimulating combinations of players, who might not otherwise have had an opportunity to work together.

Company has included a wide variety of jazz, avant-garde and modern classical musicians during its existence, including Evan Parker, Anthony Braxton, Tristan Honsinger, Misha Mengelberg, Lol Coxhill, Fred Frith, Steve Beresford, Steve Lacy, Lee Konitz, Jamie Muir, Johnny Dyani, Wadada Leo Smith, Han Bennink, Eugene Chadbourne, Henry Kaiser, John Zorn, Buckethead, and Georgie Born. “Company Weeks”, annual week-long free improvisational festivals organised by Bailey, ran from 1977 until 1994.

== Discography ==
- 1976: Company 1 - Derek Bailey, Evan Parker, Tristan Honsinger, Maarten van Altena
- 1976: Company 2 - Derek Bailey, Anthony Braxton, Evan Parker
- 1976: Company 3 - Derek Bailey, Han Bennink
- 1977: Company 4 - Derek Baily, Steve Lacy
- 1977: Company 5 - Derek Bailey, Leo Smith, Steve Lacy, Evan Parker, Anthony Braxton, Tristan Honsinger, Maarten Altena
- 1977: Fictions
- 1978: Company 6 & 7
- 1980: Fables
- 1982: Epiphany / Epiphanis
- 1983: Trios
- 1987: Once
- 1992: Company 91 (three volumes)
- 2001: Company in Marseille (recorded 1999)
