= Steve Beresford =

British musician

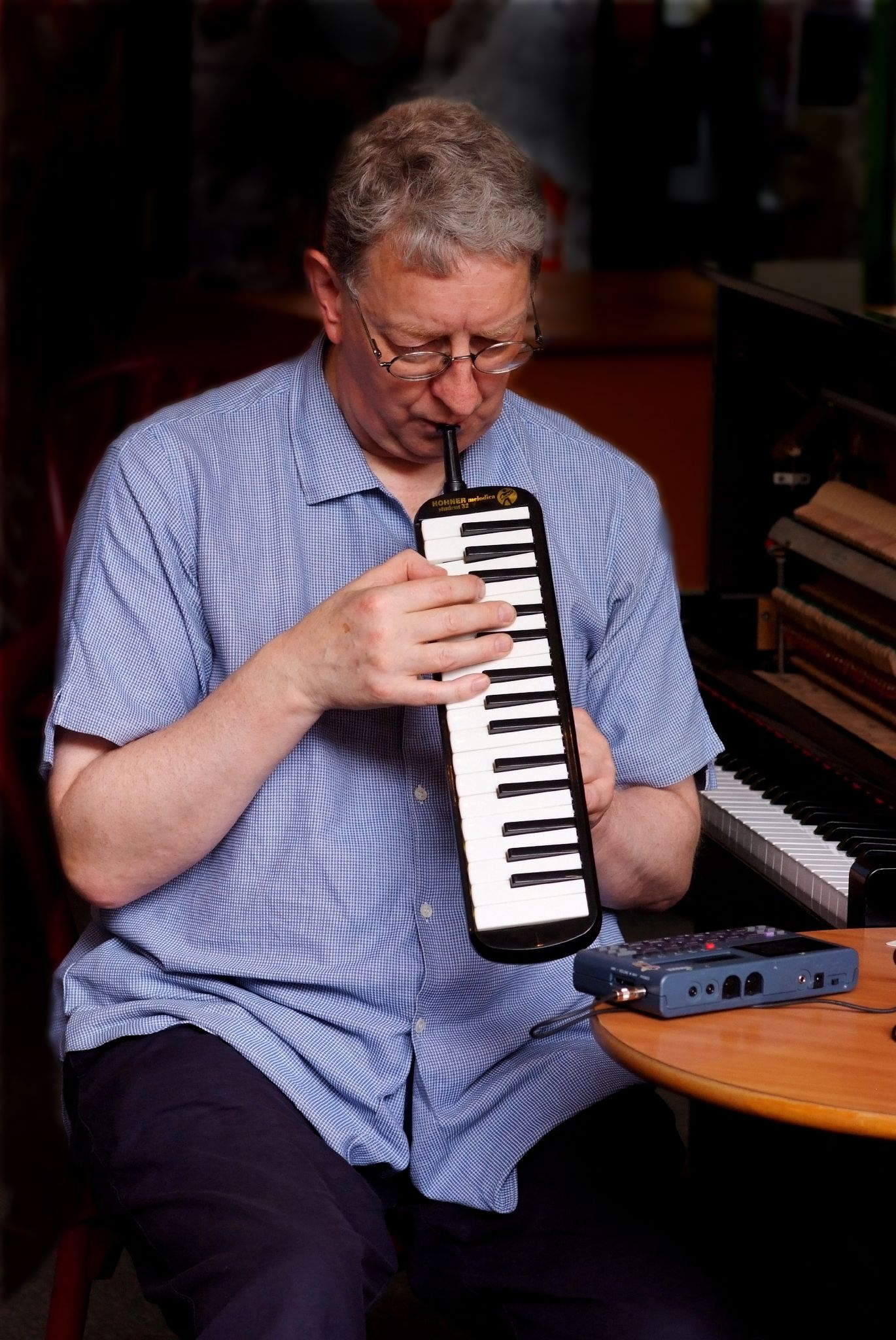

Background information
- Born: 6 March 1950 (age 76); Wellington, Shropshire, England
- Occupations: Musician, teacher
- Instruments: Melodica, toy piano, trumpet, euphonium, bass guitar
- Member of: London Improvisers Orchestra
- Formerly of: Alterations, Three Pullovers, Portsmouth Sinfonia

Steve Beresford (born 6 March 1950) is a British musician who graduated from the University of York. He has played a variety of instruments, including piano, electronics, trumpet, euphonium, bass guitar and a wide variety of toy instruments, such as the toy piano. He has also played a wide range of music. He is probably best known for free improvisation, but has also written music for film and television and has been involved with a number of pop music groups.

== Career ==
Beresford played in Derek Bailey's Company events and in the groups Alterations with David Toop, Terry Day and Peter Cusack, and the Three Pullovers with Nigel Coombes and Roger Smith. He was also a member with Gavin Bryars and Brian Eno of the Portsmouth Sinfonia.

Beresford has continued to play free improvisation with a number of prominent musicians, including Evan Parker, Lol Coxhill, John Zorn, and Han Bennink. He has collaborated extensively with Swiss-American artist/musician Christian Marclay and is member of the London Improvisers Orchestra.

From 2010 he performed various pieces by John Cage, including Indeterminacy with Tania Chen and comedian Stewart Lee, and a performance with Ilan Volkov at The BBC Proms 2012 at The Royal Albert Hall in London.

He has also worked with a number of popular musicians, including Ray Davis, The Slits, Frank Chickens, Ted Milton and The Flying Lizards. In 2015 he performed a duoproject with the upcoming Norwegian singer Natalie Sandtorv at the Blow Out! festival in Oslo, Norway.

He was awarded a Paul Hamlyn Award for Artists in 2012. He is a senior lecturer on the Commercial Music course at University of Westminster.

Beresford's music and his teachings have inspired the musical community in the UK for over a decade. British songwriter and performer Katy Carr cites Steve Beresford's lectures on musical themes associated with Free improvisation, Experimental music, John Cage, musique concrète, Diamanda Galás and The Slits as a source of initial inspiration with regard to the creation of her debut album, Screwing Lies released in 2001.

The authors of the Penguin Guide to Jazz Recordings called Beresford "one of the unsung geniuses of modern European music, a constant presence whose contribution is usually unremarked."

== Discography ==
- 1975 Teatime with Nigel Coombes, John Russell, Dave Solomon, Garry Todd (Incus)
- 1980 Whirled Music with Paul Burwell, Max Eastley, David Toop (Quartz Publications)
- 1980 White String's Attached with Nigel Coombes (Bead)
- 1980 The Bath of Surprise (Piano)
- 1980 Imitation of Life with Tristan Honsinger, Toshinori Kondo, David Toop (Y)
- 1981 Double Indemnity with Tristan Honsinger (Y)
- 1985 11 Songs for Doris Day with Deb'bora, Tony Coe, Terry Day (Chabada)
- 1986 Deadly Weapons with Tonie Marshall, David Toop, John Zorn (Nato)
- 1986 Dancing the Line with Anne Marie Beretta (Nato)
- 1987 Avril Brise (Cinenato)
- 1987 Directly to Pyjamas with Han Bennink (Nato)
- 1988 L'Extraordinaire Jardin de Charles Trenet (Chabada)
- 1989 Pentimento (Cinenato)
- 1995 Signals for Tea (Avant)
- 1996 Short in the U.K. with Palmer, Stagner, Turner (Incus)
- 1996 Cue Sheets (Tzadik)
- 1996 Fish of the Week (Scatter)
- 1997 Two to Tangle with Nigel Coombes (Emanem)
- 1999 Foxes Fox with Evan Parker, John Edwards, Louis Moholo (Emanem)
- 2001 3 Pianos with Pat Thomas, Veryan Weston (Emanem)
- 2002 Cue Sheets II (Tzadik)
- 2002 Steve Beresford (Kabukikore)
- 2002 B + B with Han Bennink (Instant Composers Pool)
- 2003 Live at the Friends Meeting House (Planet Mu)
- 2003 Trap Street with Alan Tomlinson, Roger Turner (Emanem)
- 2003 Guarda Avanti with Mike Cooper, Max Eastley, Viv Dogan Corringham, Lol Coxhill (Hipshot)
- 2004 I Shall Become a Bat (Qbico)
- 2004 Ointment with Tania Chen (Rossbin)
- 2005 Naan Tso with Foxes Fox (Evan Parker, Beresford, John Edwards, and Louis Moholo-Moholo) (Psi)
- 2009 Check for Monsters with Okkyung Lee, Peter Evans (Emanem)
- 2011 Wels, Mulhouse, Paris & Lyon with Noel Akchote, Andrew Sharpley
- 2011 Ink Room with Stephen Flinn, Dave Tucker (Creative Sources)
- 2011 Snodland with Matt Wilson (Nato)
- 2012 Indeterminacy with Tania Chen, Stewart Lee (Knitted)
- 2012 Berlin Toy Bazaar with Anna Homler, Richard Sanderson (Linear Obsessional Recordings)
- 2013 Overground to the Vortex with Francois Carrier, Michel Lambert, John Edwards (Not Two)
- 2013 Three Babies with Martin Kuechen, Stale Liavik Solberg (Peira)
- 2014 Passages with Shezad Dawoo (Op.50)
- 2015 Will It Float? with Russell, Edwards, Liavik Solberg (Va Fongool)
- 2015 Outgoing with Francois Carrier, John Edwards, Michel Lambert (FMR)
- 2015 Live at White Cube
- 2015 Blow Out! with Paal Nilssen-Love, Stale Liavik Solberg (Konsertforeninga)
- 2017 Kontakte Trio with Trevor Taylor, Ian Brighton (FMR)
- 2017 Hesitantly Pleasant Mike Caratti, Rachel Musson (Iluso)
- 2017 Live in Prague with Houtcamp, Blume
- 2018 Pleasures of the Horror with Eugene Chadbourne, Alex Ward (Bisou)
- 2019 All Will Be Said, All to Do Again with Sarah Gail Brand, John Edwards, Mark Sanders (Regardless)

== Notes ==
- Festival International de Musique Actuelle de Victoriaville in Canada:
- Christoph Wagner: Steve Beresford in "Neue Zeitschrift für Musik", Schott Music, Mainz, Germany, 2007
