= Derek Bailey (guitarist) =

English avant-garde guitarist (1930–2005)

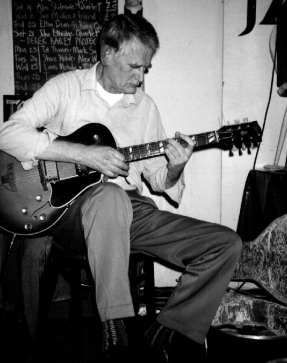
- Bailey at the Vortex Club, 1991

Background information
- Born: 29 January 1930; Sheffield, England
- Died: 25 December 2005 (aged 75) London, England
- Genres: Free improvisation, avant-garde rock, jazz rock
- Occupations: Musician, record label owner
- Instrument: Guitar
- Years active: 1950s–2005
- Labels: Incus, Table of the Elements

Derek Bailey (29 January 1930 – 25 December 2005) was an English avant-garde guitarist and an important figure in the free improvisation movement. Bailey abandoned conventional performance techniques found in jazz, exploring atonality, noise, and whatever unusual sounds he could produce with the guitar. Much of his work was released on his own label Incus Records. In addition to solo work, Bailey collaborated frequently with other musicians and recorded with collectives such as Spontaneous Music Ensemble and Company.

== Career ==
Bailey was born in Sheffield, England. A third-generation musician, he began playing guitar at the age of ten. He studied with Sheffield City Hall organist C. H. C. Biltcliffe, an experience he disliked, and with his uncle George Wing and John Duarte. As an adult he worked as a guitarist and session musician in clubs, radio, and dance hall bands, playing with Morecambe and Wise, Gracie Fields, Bob Monkhouse, Kathy Kirby, and on the television program Opportunity Knocks.

Bailey's earliest foray into free improvisation was in 1953 with two guitarists in Glasgow. He was part of a trio founded in 1963 with Tony Oxley and Gavin Bryars called Joseph Holbrooke, named after English composer Joseph Holbrooke, although the group never played his work. The band played conventional jazz at first, but later moved in the direction of free jazz.

In 1966, Bailey moved to London. At the Little Theatre Club run by drummer John Stevens, he met like-minded musicians such as saxophonist Evan Parker, trumpeter Kenny Wheeler, and double bassist Dave Holland, with whom he formed the Spontaneous Music Ensemble. In 1968 they recorded Karyobin for Island Records. Bailey formed the Music Improvisation Company with Parker, percussionist Jamie Muir, and Hugh Davies on homemade electronics. The band continued until 1971. He was a member of the Jazz Composer's Orchestra and formed the trio Iskra 1903 with double bassist Barry Guy and trombonist Paul Rutherford that was named after a newspaper published by Russian revolutionary Vladimir Lenin. He was a member of Oxley's sextet until 1973.

In 1970, Bailey founded the record label Incus with Tony Oxley, Evan Parker, and Michael Walters. It was the first musician-owned independent label in the UK. Oxley and Walters left early in the label's history; Parker and Bailey continued as co-directors until the mid-1980s, when friction between them led to Parker's departure. Bailey continued the label with his partner Karen Brookman until his death in 2005.

With other musicians, Bailey was a co-founder in 1975 of Musics magazine, described as "an impromental experivisation arts magazine".

In 1976, Bailey started the collaborative project Company, which at various times included Han Bennink, Steve Beresford, Anthony Braxton, Buckethead, Eugene Chadbourne, Lol Coxhill, Johnny Dyani, Fred Frith, Tristan Honsinger, Henry Kaiser, Steve Lacy, Keshavan Maslak, Misha Mengelberg, Wadada Leo Smith, John Zorn and many other musicians. Bailey organized the annual music festival Company Week, which lasted until 1994. In 1980, he wrote the book Improvisation: Its Nature and Practice. In 1992, the book was adapted by Channel 4 in the UK into a four-part TV series, On the Edge: Improvisation in Music, which was narrated by Bailey.

Bailey died in London on Christmas Day in 2005. He had been suffering from motor neurone disease.

== Music ==
Derek Bailey performing at the ICA Company Week, 1978

Throughout both his commercial and improvising careers, Bailey's main guitar was a 1963 Gibson ES-175 model. Although he occasionally made use of prepared guitar in the 1970s (he would, for example, put paper clips on the strings, wrap his instruments in chains, or add further strings to the guitar), often for Dadaist/theatrical effect, by the end of that decade he had, in his own words, "dumped" such methods. Bailey argued that his approach to music-making was actually far more orthodox than that of performers such as Keith Rowe of the improvising collective AMM, who treats the guitar purely as a "sound source" rather than as a musical instrument. Instead, Bailey preferred to "look for whatever 'effects' I might need through technique".

Eschewing labels such as "jazz" and "free jazz", Bailey described his music as "non-idiomatic". In the second edition of his book Improvisation..., Bailey indicated that he felt that free improvisation was no longer "non-idiomatic" in his sense of the word, as it had become a recognizable genre and musical style itself. Bailey frequently sought performance contexts that would provide new stimulations and challenge that would prove musically "interesting", as he often put it. This led to work with collaborators such as Pat Metheny, John Zorn, Lee Konitz, David Sylvian, Cyro Baptista, Cecil Taylor, Keiji Haino, tap dancer Will Gaines, Drum 'n' Bass DJ Ninj, Susie Ibarra, Thurston Moore of Sonic Youth and the Japanese noise rock group Ruins. Despite often performing and recording in a solo context, he was far more interested in the dynamics and challenges of working with other musicians, especially those who did not necessarily share his approach. As he put it in a March 2002 article of Jazziz magazine:

There has to be some degree, not just of unfamiliarity, but incompatibility [with a partner]. Otherwise, what are you improvising for? What are you improvising with or around? You've got to find somewhere where you can work. If there are no difficulties, it seems to me that there's pretty much no point in playing. I find that the things that excite me are trying to make something work. And when it does work, it's the most fantastic thing. Maybe the most obvious analogy would be the grit that produces the pearl in an oyster, or some shit like that.

Bailey was also known for his dry sense of humour. In 1977, Musics magazine sent the question "What happens to time-awareness during improvisation?" to about thirty musicians associated with the free improvisation scene. The answers received varied from long, and theoretical essays to plain, direct comments. Typically pithy was Bailey's reply: "The ticks turn into tocks and the tocks turn into ticks."

Mirakle, a 1999 recording released in 2000, shows Bailey moving into the free funk genre, performing with bassist Jamaaladeen Tacuma and drummer Grant Calvin Weston. Carpal Tunnel, the last album to be released during his lifetime, documented his struggle with the carpal tunnel syndrome in his right hand which had rendered him unable to grip a plectrum. This problem marked the onset of motor neurone disease. Characteristically, he refused invasive surgery to treat his condition, instead being more "interested in finding ways to work around" this limitation. He chose to "relearn" guitar playing techniques by utilising his right thumb and index fingers to pluck the strings.

== Discography ==
=== As leader/solo ===
- 1970 The Topography of the Lungs with Han Bennink and Evan Parker (Incus)
- 1971 Han Bennink & Derek Bailey with Han Bennink (ICP)
- 1971 Fragment with Misha Mengelberg, John Tchicai, Han Bennink (ICP)
- 1971 Solo Guitar (Incus)
- 1971 Improvisations for Cello and Guitar with Dave Holland (ECM)
- 1972 Derek Bailey & Han Bennink with Han Bennink (incus)
- 1974 Lot 74 - Solo Improvisations (incus)
- 1974 First Duo Concert with Anthony Braxton (Emanem)
- 1975 Improvisation (Cramps)
- 1975 The London Concert with Evan Parker (Incus)
- 1976 Guitar Solos 2 with Fred Frith, G. F. Fitzgerald, Hans Reichel (Caroline)
- 1977 Drops with Andrea Centazzo (Ictus)
- 1978 Duo & Trio Improvisation with Toshinori Kondo, Kaoru Abe, Mototeru Takagi, Motoharu Yoshizawa, Toshi Tsuchitori (Kitty)
- 1979 Time with Tony Coe (Incus)
- 1980 Aida (Incus)
- 1980 Views from Six Windows with Christine Jeffrey (Metalanguage)
- 1981 Dart Drug with Jamie Muir (Incus)
- 1982 Cyro with Cyro Baptista (Incus)
- 1983 Yankees with George E. Lewis and John Zorn (Celluloid)
- 1985 Notes: Solo Improvisations (Incus)
- 1986 Compatibles with Evan Parker (Incus)
- 1987 Moment Précieux with Anthony Braxton (Victo)
- 1988 Figuring with Barre Phillips (Incus)
- 1992 Village Life with Louis Moholo, Thebe Lipere (Incus)
- 1993 Wireforks with Henry Kaiser (Shanachie)
- 1993 Playing (Incus)
- 1994 Drop Me Off at 96th (Scatter)
- 1995 Saisoro with the Ruins (Tzadik)
- 1995 Harras with William Parker, John Zorn (Avant)
- 1995 Banter with Gregg Bendian (OODiscs)
- 1996 Close to the Kitchen with Noël Akchoté (Rectangle)
- 1996 Lace (Emanem)
- 1996 Guitar, Drums 'n' Bass (Avant)
- 1997 Music & Dance (Revenant)
- 1997 And with Pat Thomas, Steve Noble (Rectangle)
- 1997 Takes Fakes and Dead She Dances (Incus)
- 1997 Trio Playing (Incus)
- 1998 Tohjinbo (Paratactile)
- 1998 Viper with Min Xiao-Fen (Avant)
- 1998 No Waiting with Joelle Leandre (Potlatch)
- 1998 Dynamics of the Impromptu with John Stevens, Trevor Watts (Entropy Stereo)
- 1999 Arch Duo with Evan Parker (Ratascan)
- 1999 Playbacks (Bingo)
- 1999 Outcome with Steve Lacy (Potlatch)
- 1999 Daedal with Susie Ibarra (Incus)
- 2000 Locational with Alex Ward (Incus)
- 2000 String Theory (Paratactile)
- 2000 Mirakle with Jamaaladeen Tacuma, Calvin Weston (Tzadik)
- 2000 Songs with Keiji Haino (Incus)
- 2001 Llaer with Ingar Zach (Sofa)
- 2001 Fish with Shoji Hano (PSF)
- 2001 Ore with Eddie Prévost (Arrival)
- 2002 Barcelona with Agusti Fernandez (Hopscotch)
- 2002 Ballads (Tzadik)
- 2002 Right Off with Carlos Bechegas (Numerica)
- 2002 Duos, London 2001 (Incus)
- 2002 Bailey/Hautzinger with Franz Hautzinger (Grob)
- 2002 Pieces for Guitar (Tzadik)
- 2002 New Sights Old Sounds (Incus)
- 2003 Soshin with Fred Frith, Antoine Berthiaume (Ambiances Magnétiques,)
- 2003 Nearly a D with Frode Gjerstad (Emanem)
- 2004 Scale Points on the Fever Curve with Milo Fine (Emanem)
- 2005 Carpal Tunnel (Tzadik)
- 2006 To Play: The Blemish Sessions (Samadhisound)
- 2006 Derek with Cyro Baptista (Amulet)
- 2007 Standards (Tzadik)
- 2008 Tony Oxley Derek Bailey Quartet (Jazzwerkstatt)
- 2009 A Silent Dance with Agusti Fernandez
- 2009 Out of the Past with Steve Noble
- 2009 Good Cop Bad Cop with Tony Bevan, Paul Hession & Ōtomo Yoshihide (No-Fi)
- 2010 More 74: Solo Guitar Improvisations (Incus)
- 2011 Words (Rectangle, 2011)
- 2011 Scrutables (Weight of Wax, 2011) with John Butcher and Gino Robair
- 2011 This Guitar (Rectangle, 2011)
- 2012 Derek Bailey Plus One Music Ensemble (Nondo)
- 2013 The Complete 15th August 2001 (Confront, 2013) with Simon H. Fell
- 2014 28 Rue Dunois Juillet 1982 (Fou Records, 2014)
- 2017 Extracting Fish-Bones from the Back of the Despoiler with Greg Goodman - live 1992
- 2019 Topographie Parisienne (Dunois, April 3d, 1981) (Fou Records, 2019) with Han Bennink and Evan Parker
- 2020 Leeds 08/11/1996 with The XIII Ghosts (Scatter) - digital release
- 2020 1993+1992 with John Stevens (Scatter) - digital release
- 2020 Live at FarOut, Atsugi 1987 (NoBusiness) with Mototeru Takagi – live 1987
- 2021 Improvisation with Angharad Davies and Rhodri Davies (Scatter) - recorded 2002, digital release
- 2022 Domestic Jungle (Scatter) - digital release
- 2022 Domestic Jungle DAT (Scatter) - digital release
- 2022 New York 1982 with Charlie Morrow and Friends (Recital)
- 2023 Duo in Concert with Paul Motian (Frozen Reeds) - live 1990

=== As a member ===
Arcana
With Bill Laswell and Tony Williams

- The Last Wave (DIW, 1996) – recorded in 1995

Company

- The Music Improvisation Company (ECM, 1970)
- The Music Improvisation Company 1968–1971 (Incus, 1976)
- Company 1 (Incus, 1976)
- Company 2 (Incus, 1976)
- Company 3 (Incus, 1976)
- Company 4 (Incus, 1977)
- Fictions (Incus, 1977)
- Company 5 (Incus, 1977)
- Company 6 & 7 (Incus, 1978)
- Fables (Incus, 1980)
- Epiphany / Epiphanies (Incus, 1982)
- Trios (Incus, 1983)
- Once (Incus, 1987)
- Company 91 (Incus, 1994) - three volumes
- Company in Marseille (Incus, 2001)
- Klinker (Confront, 2018)
- Epiphanies I-VI (Honest Jon's, 2019)
- Epiphanies VII-XIII (Honest Jon's, 2019)
- 1981 (Honest Jon's, 2019)
- 1983 (Honest Jon's, 2020)
- Virtual Company (Confront, 2020)

Iskra 1903
With Paul Rutherford and Barry Guy

- Iskra 1903 (Incus, 1972) reissued in expanded form as Chapter One: 1970–1972 (Emanem, 2000)
- Buzz (Emanem, 2002)

=== As co-leader ===
With Joseph Holbrooke Trio

- "'65 (Rehearsal Extract)" single (Incus, 1999)
- '98 (Incus, 2000)
- The Moat Recordings (Tzadik, 2006) – recorded in 1998

With the Spontaneous Music Ensemble

- Karyobin (Island, 1968)
- Withdrawal (1996-7) (Emanem, 1997)
- Quintessence (Emanem, 2007) – recorded in 1973-74

With others

- Globe Unity Orchestra, Globe Unity 67 & 70, (FMP, 1970)
- Barry Guy/The London Jazz Composers' Orchestra, Ode (Incus, 1972)
- Groupcomposing with Han Bennink/Peter Bennink/Peter Brötzmann/Misha Mengelberg/Evan Parker/Paul Rutherford (Instant Composers Pool, 1978)
- The Sign of Four with Pat Metheny, Gregg Bendian, Paul Wertico (Knitting Factory, 1997)
- Soho Suites with Tony Oxley (Incus, 1997)
- The Gospel Record with Amy Denio, Dennis Palmer (Shaking Ray Records, 2005)
- The Advocate with Tony Oxley (Tzadik, 2007)

=== As sideman ===
With Steve Lacy

- Saxophone Special (Emanem, 1974)
- The Crust (Emanem, 1975)
- Dreams (Saravah, 1975)

With Tony Oxley

- The Baptised Traveller (1969)
- 4 Compositions for Sextet (1970)
- Ichnos (1971)
- The Tony Oxley Quartet (1993)
- A Birthday Tribute: 75 years (2013) recorded in 1977 and 1993

With John Zorn

- The Big Gundown (1985)
- Cobra: John Zorn's Game Pieces Volume 2 (2002)

With others

- European Echoes, Manfred Schoof (1969)
- Nipples, Peter Brötzmann (1969)
- Song for Someone, Kenny Wheeler (Incus, 1973)
- First Duo Concert, Anthony Braxton (1974)
- Jesus' Blood Never Failed Me Yet/The Sinking of the Titanic, Gavin Bryars (Obscure, 1975)
- Les Douzes Sons, Joëlle Léandre (1983)
- Pleistozaen Mit Wasser, Cecil Taylor (1988)
- Boogie with the Hook, Eugene Chadbourne (1996)
- The Last Wave, Arcana (DIW, 1996)
- Sequences 72 & 73, Paul Rutherford and Iskra 1912 (Emanem, 1997)
- Legend of the Blood Yeti, Thurston Moore (Infinite Chug, 1997)
- Hello, Goodbye, Frode Gjerstad (2001)
- Fuck de Boere, Peter Brötzmann (Atavistic, 2001) recorded in 1968 and 1970
- Vortices and Angels, John Butcher (2001)
- Blemish, David Sylvian (Samadhisound, 2003)
- Domo Arigato Derek Sensei, Henry Kaiser (2005)
