= A Day Will Come =

A Day Will Come may refer to:

- A Day Will Come (1934 film)
- A Day Will Come (1950 film)

== See also ==
- The Day Will Come (disambiguation)
