= Paul Dunmall =

British jazz musician

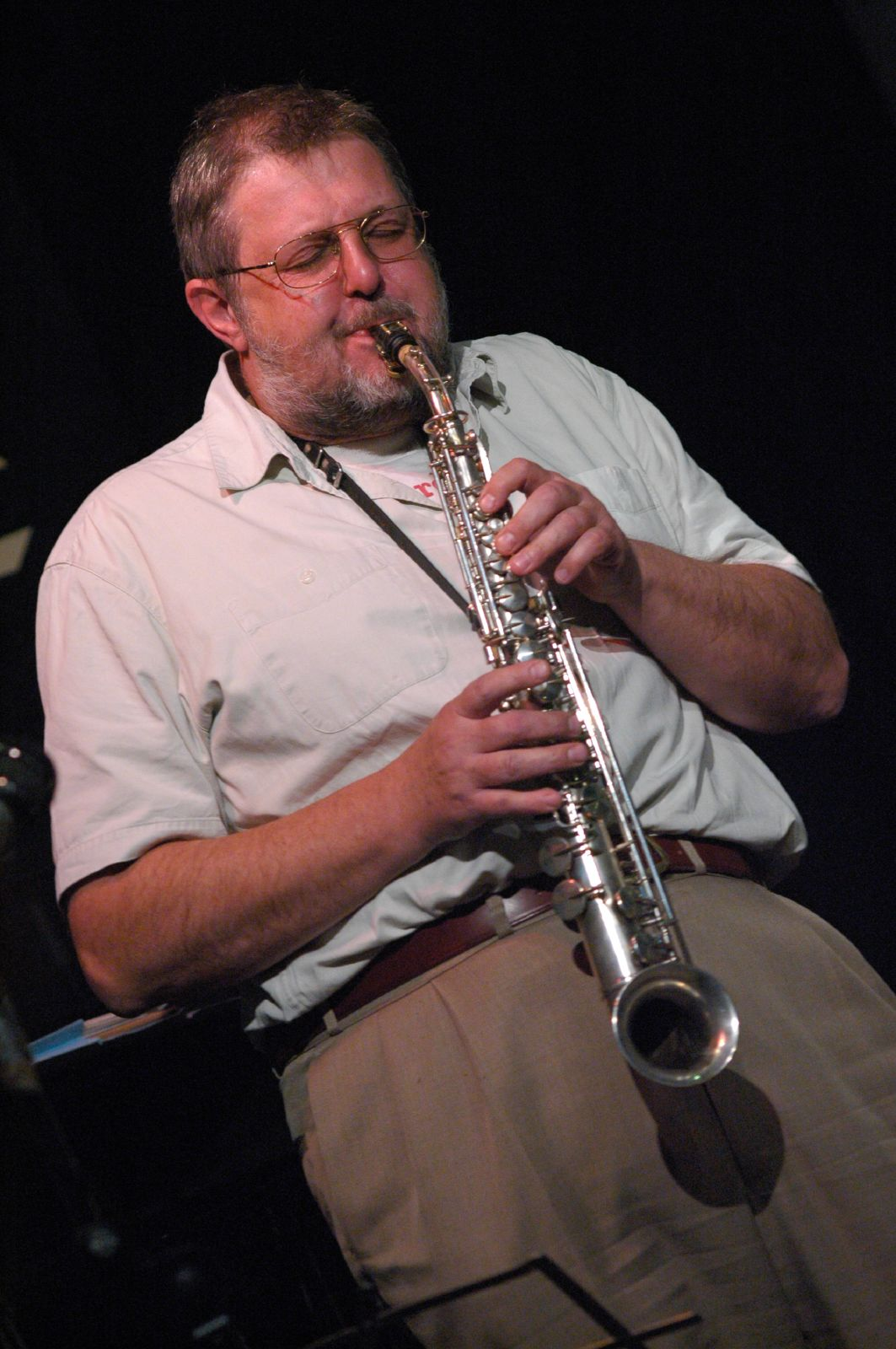
- Dunmall performing in 2007

Background information
- Born: 6 May 1953 (age 73); Welling, Kent, England
- Genres: Free jazz, Free improvisation
- Occupations: Musician, bandleader
- Instruments: Saxophone, saxello, Northumbrian smallpipes, clarinet, bagpipes

Paul Dunmall (born 6 May 1953) is a British jazz musician who plays tenor and soprano saxophone, as well as the baritone and the more exotic saxello and the Northumbrian smallpipes. He has played with Keith Tippett and Barry Guy.

In the early 1970s Dunmall joined progressive rock band "Marsupilami" for their second album, Arena. He toured with the band until it folded in September 1971 but played with the band on the Spirit of 1971 stage in 2011 at the Glastonbury Festival. He then became a member of the Divine Light Mission and toured the U.S. His first recording as sideman was as the saxophonist on the 1976 Johnny Guitar Watson album Ain't That a Bitch.

== Discography ==
=== As leader ===
- 1986 Soliloquy (Matchless)
- 1989/93 Folks Duo with Paul Rogers (Slam)
- 1990 The journey Mujician (Cuneiform)
- 1991 The Bristol concert Mujician/The Georgian Ensemble (What Disc)
- 1992 Live in London Paul Dunmall/Tim Wells/Dave Alexander (Duns)
- 1993 Quartet, Sextet and Trio/Babu (Slam)
- 1993 Birmingham concert Parker/Dunmall/Guy/Levin (Rare)
- 1993/4 Spiritual empathy Duo with Tony Levin (Rare)
- 1994 Poem about the hero Mujician (Cuneiform)
- 1995 Early October British Saxophone Quartet (Slam)
- 1995 Birdman Mujician (Cuneiform)
- 1995 Long meadow Paul Dunmall/Andy Isham (Duns)
- 1995 If Dubois only knew Elton Dean/Paul Dunmall (Blueprint)
- 1996 Bladik Mujician/Roswell Rudd/Elton Dean (Cuneiform)
- 1996 Essential expressions Duo with Tony Levin (Cadence Jazz)
- 1996 Desire and liberation Paul Dunmall Octet (Slam)
- 1996 Ghostly thoughts Paul Dunmall/John Adams/Mark Sanders Hatology
- 1997 Colours fulfilled Mujician (Cuneiform)
- 1997 Zap II Paul Dunmall/Mark Sanders/Steve Noble/Oren Marshall/John Adams (Duns)
- 1997 Bebop stardust Paul Dunmall Octet (Cuneiform)
- 1997 Cocteau's ghost Paul Dunmall/Tony Irving (Duns)
- 1997 Elton Elton Dean/Paul Dunmall/Paul Rogers/Tony Levin (Duns)
- 1998 Shooters Hill Paul Dunmall Sextet FMR
- 1998 Totally fried up Paul Dunmall/John Adams/Mark Sanders (Slam)
- 1999 Solo bagpipes (Duns)
- 1999 Utoma Trio Tony Bianco/Paul Dunmall/Simon Picard (Emanem)
- 1999 Live at 'The Subtone' Dunmall/Adams/Sanders (Duns)
- 1999 Hit and run Dunmall with Edwards with Butcher FMP
- 1999 Bersudsky's machines Brian Irvine (Coyote)
- 1999/2000 Master musicians of MU Paul Dunmall/Philip Gibbs (Slam)
- 2000 QED Elton Dean (Blueprint)
- 2000 Out from the cage Dunmall/Bianco/Edwards/Adams FMR
- 2000 It escapes me Paul Dunmall/Tony Marsh/Philip Gibbs (Duns)
- 2000 Zap III Paul Dunmall/Tony Marsh/Steve Noble/Oren Marshall/Philip Gibbs/John Adams (Duns)
- 2000 Onosante Paul Dunmall/Keith Tippett/Philip Gibbs/Pete Fairclough (Duns)
- 2000 EastWestNorthSouth Dunmall/Adams/Gibbs/Sanders FMR
- 2000 The Great divide Paul Dunmall Octet (Cuneiform)
- 2001 I You Dunmall/Bianco FMR
- 2001 Manjah Paul Dunmall/Philip Gibbs/M. Balachandar (Duns)
- 2001 Skirting the river road: songs and settings of Whitman Blake and Vaughan Robin Williamson (ECM)
- 2001 Alien art Paul Dunmall/Paul Rogers (Duns)
- 2001 Something normal Paul Dunmall/Philip Gibbs/John Adams (Duns)
- 2001 Gwinks Paul Dunmall/Paul Rogers/Philip Gibbs (Duns)
- 2001 Solo bagpipes II (Duns)
- 2001 Ja ja spoon Paul Dunmall/Paul Rogers (Duns)
- 2001 Live at the Klinker 2001 Paul Dunmall/Tony Marsh (Duns)
- 2001 Zooplongoma Dunmall/Jeffries/Gibbs/Adams/Marsh (Duns)
- 2001 Spacetime Mujician (Cuneiform)
- 2001 Kunikazu Paul Dunmall/Keith Tippett/Philip Gibbs/Peter Fairclough/Roberto Bellatalla (Duns)
- 2001 Simple skeletons Paul Dunmall/Philip Gibbs/Paul Rogers/Tony Levin (Duns)
- 2001 Dark clouds gathering Paul Dunmall/Philip Gibbs/Tony Bianco/Chris Dodds (Duns)
- 2001 All sorts of rituals Paul Dunmall/Philip Gibbs (Duns)
- 2002 The vision Paul Dunmall/Philip Gibbs (Duns)
- 2002 The State of Moksha Paul Dunmall/Paul Rogers/Philip Gibbs (Duns)
- 2002 The State of Moksha live Paul Dunmall/Paul Rogers/Philip Gibbs (Duns)
- 2002 Hour glass Two trios of Tony Bianco and Paul Dunmall with Marcio Mattos/Paul Rogers (Emanem)
- 2002 Bridging: The Great divide live Paul Dunmall Octet (Clean Feed)
- 2002 Bread & wine Paul Dunmall/Tony Bianco (Duns)
- 2002 Live at the Quaker Centre Paul Dunmall/Paul Rogers/Philip Gibbs (Duns)
- 2002 No agents of evil Paul Dunmall/Philip Gibbs/Andrew Ball/Neil Metcalfe/Hilary Jeffreys (Duns)
- 2002 High bird, low bird Paul Dunmall/Hilary Jeffreys/Tony Marsh (Duns)
- 2002 Garganchelopes Paul Dunmall/Philip Gibbs/Hilary Jeffreys/Tony Bianco (Duns)
- 2003 In your shell like Paul Dunmall/Paul Lytton/Stevie Wishart (Emanem)
- 2003 It's abit nocturnal Paul Dunmall/Paul Rogers/Philip Gibbs/Neil Metcalfe (Duns)
- 2003 Can't just be a body Paul Dunmall/Philip Gibbs/John Adams (Duns)
- 2003 Newsagents Paul Dunmall/Philip Gibbs/Andrew Ball/Neil Metcalfe/Hilary Jeffreys (Duns)
- 2003 Rylickolum: for your pleasure Paul Dunmall/Paul Rogers/Kevin Norton (Cimp)
- 2003 Go forth Duck Paul Dunmall/Paul Rogers/Kevin Norton (Cimp)
- 2003 Solo bagpipes FMR
- 2003 Log cabins Paul Dunmall/Paul Rogers (Duns)
- 2003 I wish you peace Paul Dunmall Moksha Big Band (Cuneiform)
- 2003 Awareness response Paul Dunmall/Paul Rogers (Emanem)
- 2003 19 years later Paul Dunmall/Bruce Coates (Duns)
- 2004 Nimes Paul Dunmall/Paul Rogers/Philip Gibbs (4-CD set limited to 85 copies) (Duns)
- 2004 Love, warmth and compassion Paul Dunmall Quartet FMR
- 2004 Moksha or mocca Paul Dunmall/Paul Rogers/Philip Gibbs/Rhodri Davies (Duns)
- 2004 Not a bit like coco Paul Dunmall/Paul Rogers/Philip Gibbs/Neil Metcalfe (Duns)
- 2004 Brothers in music Paul Dunmall/Simon Thoumire/John Edwards/Philip Gibbs (Duns)
- 2004 Undistracted Paul Rogers/Andrew Ball/Philip Gibbs/Jonathan Impett/Paul Dunmall (Duns)
- 2004 Live at the Old Library Paul Dunmall/Bruce Coates/Philip Gibbs/Hilary Jeffrey (Duns)
- 2004 Live at the Priory Dartington Improvising Trio FMR
- 2004 Vesuvius Schlippenbach/Dunmall/Rogers/Bianco (Slam)CD 262
- 2004 Deep joy Tony Levin/Paul Dunmall/Paul Rogers (4-CD set) (Duns)
- 2005 Bernd Wimmer on the burnt zimmer Paul Dunmall/Philip Gibbs/Steve Davis/Dave Kane (Duns)
- 2005 Mahogany rain Keith Tippett/Julie Tippetts/Philip Gibbs/Paul Dunmall (Duns)
- 2005 The big return Philip Gibbs/Paul Rogers/Paul Dunmall (Duns)
- 2005 Thank you Dorothy Paul Dunmall/Paul Rogers/Philip Gibbs/Tony Levin (Duns)
- 2005 Tapaleit Paul Dunmall/Marcus Stockhausen/Philip Gibbs (Duns)
- 2005 Neen Philip Gibbs/Tony Hymas/Paul Dunmall (Duns)
- 2005 Unnaturals, sharps & flats Solo FMR
- 2005 Illuminations Duo with Trevor Taylor FMR
- 2005 Don't take the magic out of life Paul Dunmall/Paul Rogers/Philip Gibbs (Duns)
- 2005 Cosmic craftsmen Paul Rogers/Tony Bianco/Paul Dunmall FMR
- 2005 Zooghosis Paul Dunmall/Trevor Taylor/Paul Rogers FMR
- 2005 Peace and joy Paul Dunmall/Paul Rogers/Philip Gibbs/Hamid Drake (Slam)
- 2005 There's no going back now Mujician (Cuneiform)
- 2006 Solo tenor (Duns)
- 2006 Music on two pianos Paul Dunmall/Philip Gibbs (Duns)
- 2006 Occasional rain Paul Dunmall/Peter Brandt FMR
- 2006 Deep well Paul Dunmall/Peter Brandt/Tony Marsh FMR
- 2006 Deep whole Paul Dunmall/Paul Rogers/Mark Sanders FMR
- 2006 Blown away Paul Dunmall/Philip Gibbs/Roy Campbell/Daniel Carter/Paul Rogers/William Parker/Hamid Drake (Duns)
- 2007 Deep see Paul Dunmall/Tony Orrell/Jim Barr FMR
- 2009 Opus de Life with Henry Grimes and Andrew Cyrille as the Profound Sound Trio, Porter
- 2012 Intervention Paul Dunmall/Neil McGovern (Ft. Matt London) FMR
- 2017: Maha Samadhi by Paul Dunmall Brass Project
- 2023: Bright Light a Joyous Celebration
- 2026 Afraid To Speak Paul Dunmall/Corey Mwamba/Steven Saunders/Dave Kane/Miles Levin (Discus Music)

=== As sideman ===
- 1976 Ain't That a Bitch, Johnny "Guitar" Watson, DJM Records
- 1982 Mice in the wallet Spirit Level (Spotlite)
- 1984 Proud owners Spirit Level (Spotlite)
- 1986 Killer Bunnies Jack Walrath + Spirit Level (Spotlite)
- 1986 Soliloquy MATCHLESS
- 1989 Swiss Radio tapes Spirit Level RISR
- 1979-1999 Great spirit: best of Spirit Level Spirit Level
- 1987 A Andy Shepherd (Antilles)
- 1989 Whatever next Danny Thompson (Antilles)
- 1987/88 Two's and three's Elton Dean (Voiceprint)
- 1987/1988 Zurich Concerts London Jazz Composers Orchestra (Intakt)
- 1989 Harmos London Jazz Composers Orchestra (Intakt)
- 1989 Double Trouble London Jazz Composers Orchestra (Intakt)
- 1989 Elton Dean's Unlimited Saxophone Company Elton Dean OGUN
- 1990 Elemental Danny Thompson (Antilles)
- 1990 The saxophone phenomenon Various Artists (Slam)
- 1991 Theoria London Jazz Composers Orchestra (Intakt)
- 1991 Study II/Stringer London Jazz Composers Orchestra (Intakt)
- 1991 Passed Normal volume 5 Elton Dean ensemble FOT
- 1993 View across the bay Polly Bolton PBB
- 1993 Portraits London Jazz Composers Orchestra (Intakt)
- 1995 Shepherd wheel The Fairclough Group ASC
- 1995 Early October British Saxophone Quartet (Slam)
- 1995 Three pieces for orchestra London Jazz Composers Orchestra (Intakt)
- 1995 Double Trouble Two London Jazz Composers Orchestra (Intakt)
- 1995 Silent knowledge Elton Dean Quintet (Cuneiform)
- 1996 Bladik Elton Dean with Mujician/Roswell Rudd (Cuneiform)
- 1996 Extremely Quartet John Law HAT ART
- 1997 Industry Richard Thompson EMI
- 1999 Bersudsky's machines Brian Irvine (Coyote)
- 2000 QED Elton Dean (Blueprint)
- 2001 Skirting the river road: songs and settings of Whitman Blake and Vaughan Robin Williamson (ECM)
- 2003 Solo bagpipes FMR
- 2003 Now Intuitive Art Ensemble FMR
- 2011 Montana Strange Brian Irvine Ensemble FMR
