= Double Trouble (Barry Guy and the London Jazz Composers' Orchestra album) =

Studio album by Barry Guy and the London Jazz Composers' Orchestra
- Released: 1990
- Recorded: April 5 and 6, 1989
- Studio: Radio Studio DRS, Zürich, Switzerland
- Genre: Free jazz
- Length: 46:30
- Label: Intakt; CD 019
- Producer: Intakt Records

Barry Guy and the London Jazz Composers' Orchestra chronology
Harmos (1989)	Double Trouble (1990)	Theoria (1992)

Double Trouble is an album by Barry Guy and the London Jazz Composers' Orchestra. Documenting a large-scale, 46-minute composition by Guy, it was recorded in April 1989 in Zürich, Switzerland, and was released in 1990 by Intakt Records.

The title refers to the fact that the work was originally conceived as a double concerto for pianists Howard Riley and Alexander von Schlippenbach, joined by the combined forces of the London Jazz Composers' Orchestra and the Globe Unity Orchestra. A second recorded realization of the piece can be found on Double Trouble Two, released by Intakt in 1998.

== Reception ==
Professional ratings
Review scores
Source	Rating
AllMusic	4.5/5 stars
The Penguin Guide to Jazz	3.5/4 stars

In a review for AllMusic, Brian Olewnick noted that the album "gives a fine example of what this group could do." He commented: "Guy deploys his 18-piece orchestra in ever-shifting groupings and conjures forth a wide-ranging array of thematic material that still coalesces into a satisfying whole... A superb recording... Very highly recommended."

The authors of The Penguin Guide to Jazz Recordings wrote: "the piece has a tremendous centrifugal coherence that balances the apparently anarchic but highly organized behaviour of soloists and section-players."

Writing for Dusted Magazine, Tim Daisy stated that Double Trouble was "an access point into a new world of sound" for him, and praised the playing of drummer Paul Lytton, who presented "a whole new vocabulary than what I was used to hearing; an amazing array of sounds on the drums."

== Track listing ==
1. "Double Trouble" (Barry Guy) – 46:30

== Personnel ==
- Barry Guy – bass, conductor
- Evan Parker – reeds
- Trevor Watts – reeds
- Paul Dunmall – reeds
- Peter McPhail – reeds
- Simon Picard – reeds
- Henry Lowther – trumpet
- Jon Corbett – trumpet
- Marc Charig – cornet
- Paul Rutherford – trombone
- Alan Tomlinson – trombone
- Radu Malfatti – trombone
- Steve Wick – tuba
- Philipp Wachsmann – violin
- Howard Riley – piano
- Barre Phillips – bass
- Paul Lytton – drums
