= Ode (London Jazz Composers' Orchestra album) =

Live album by Barry Guy and the London Jazz Composers' Orchestra
- Released: 1972
- Recorded: 22 April 1972
- Venue: Oxford Town Hall, England
- Genre: Free jazz
- Length: 97:53
- Label: Incus 6/7

Barry Guy chronology
Ode (1972)	Zurich Concerts (1988)

CD reissue

Ode is an album by the London Jazz Composers' Orchestra composed by bassist Barry Guy and conducted by his teacher, Buxton Orr. It was recorded as part of the English Bach Festival at the Oxford Town Hall in 1972 and first released as a double album on the Incus label then as a double CD on Intakt in 1996 with additional material.

== Reception ==
Professional ratings
Review scores
Source	Rating
Allmusic	3/5 stars
Penguin Guide to Jazz	👑

The Allmusic review by Thom Jurek called it "among the most profound, hard-swinging, mind-bending exercises they've ever recorded" and states "the result is a stunning array of questions, colors, shapes, timbres, textures, and moods. For Guy to score such an intricate tome, opening up the orchestra is an artistic feat; for it to sound so approachable and welcoming to non-musicians, or those approaching the music tentatively or enthusiastically, Ode is a kind of miracle".

The Penguin Guide to Jazz identified the album as part of their suggested "Core Collection" of essential jazz albums and awarded the compilation a "Crown" signifying a recording that the authors "feel a special admiration or affection for".

== Track listing ==
All compositions by Barry Guy.

1. "Part I: Introduction - The End - Edgar Ende, 1931" - 8:58
2. "Part II: Strophe I - Memory of the Future - Oscar Dominguez, 1939" - 8.56
3. "Part III: Antistrophe I - Exact Sensibility - Oscar Dominguez, 1935" - 14.11
4. "Part IV: Strophe II - Indefinite Indivisibility - Yves Tanguy, 1942" - 23.44
5. "Part V: Antistrophe II - According to the Laws of Chance - Jean Arp, 1917" - 10.56
6. "Part VI: Epôde - Presence of Mind- René Magritte, 1958" - 19.00
7. "Part VII: Coda - Melancholy Departure - Georgio de Chirico, 1916" - 11.48 Bonus track on CD reissue

== Personnel ==
- Barry Guy - bass, composer
- Buxton Orr - conductor
- Harry Beckett, Dave Holdsworth - trumpet
- Marc Charig - cornet
- Mike Gibbs, Paul Nieman, Paul Rutherford - trombone
- Dick Hart - tuba
- Trevor Watts - alto saxophone, soprano saxophone
- Bernhard Living, Mike Osborne - alto saxophone
- Evan Parker, Alan Wakeman - soprano saxophone, tenor saxophone
- Bob Downes - flute, tenor saxophone
- Karl Jenkins - baritone saxophone, oboe
- Howard Riley - piano
- Derek Bailey - guitar
- Jeff Clyne, Chris Laurence - bass
- Paul Lytton, Tony Oxley - percussion
