= Radu Malfatti =

Austrian musician and composer

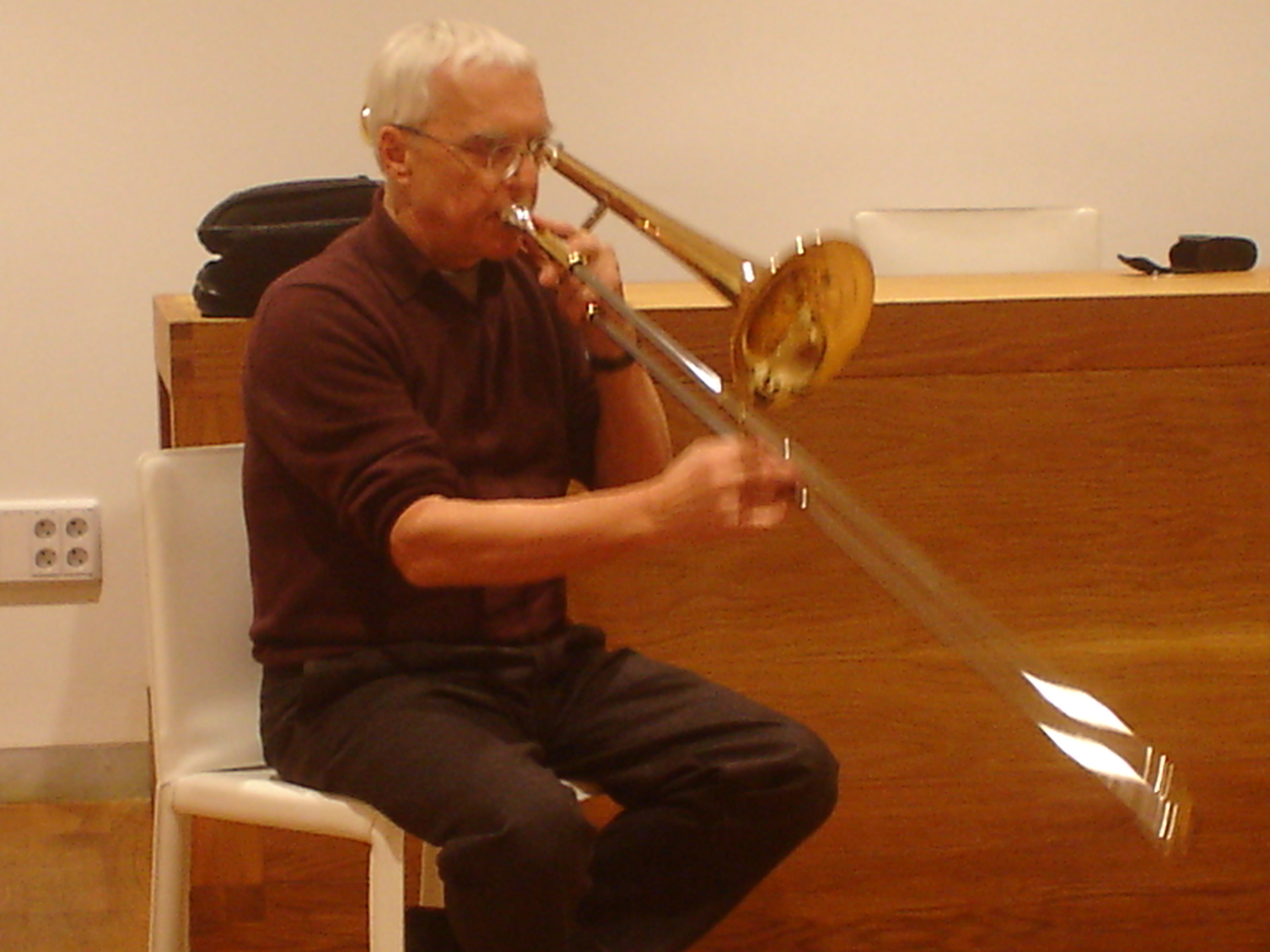
- Radu Malfatti during soundcheck before his first concert in Galicia, Spain, 2008

Background information
- Born: December 16, 1943; Innsbruck, Austria
- Genres: experimental
- Occupation: Musician
- Instruments: Trombone, harmonica
- Years active: 1975–present
- Labels: Erstwhile, B-boim

Radu Malfatti is an Austrian trombone and harmonica player, and composer. He was born in Innsbruck, in the province of Tyrol, on December 16, 1943. Malfatti is associated with the style of music known as reductionism and has been described as "among the leaders in redefining the avant-garde as truly on-the-edge art." His work "since the early nineties... has been investigating the edges of ultraminimalism in both his composed and improvised work." He also operates B-Boim, a CD-R-only record label focusing on improvised and composed music, much of it his own.

== Discography ==
=== As leader ===
- Balance with Balance (Incus, 1973)
- Thrumblin with Stephan Wittwer (FMP, 1976)
- Und? with Stephan Wittwer (FMP, 1978)
- Bracknell Breakdown with Harry Miller (Ogun, 1978)
- Humanimal with Jerry Chardonnens (Hat Hut, 1980)
- Blek with M.L.A. Blek (FMP, 1981)
- Ach Was!? with Ulrich Gumpert, Tony Oxley (FMP, 1981)
- Zwecknagel with Harry Miller (FMP, 1981)
- Formu (Nato, 1983)
- Ohrkiste (ITM, 1992)
- Radu Malfatti (Wandelweiser, 1997)
- Dach with Durrant/Lehn (Erstwhile, 2001)
- Going Fragile (Formed, 2006)
- Zeitschatten (B-Boim, 2007)
- Das Pelzige M (B-Boim, 2007)
- Three Backgrounds with Frey/Pisaro (B-Boim, 2007)
- Hoffinger Nonett (B-Boim, 2007)
- Nonostante II (B-Boim, 2007)
- Hoffingerquartett (B-Boim, 2007)
- Friedrichshofquartett (B-Boim, 2007)
- Dusseldorf Oktett (B-Boim, 2007)
- Raum Zeit I (B-Boim, 2007)
- Kid Ailack 5 (B-Boim, 2008)
- Dusseldorf Vielfaches (B-Boim, 2008)
- Claude Lorrain 1 (B-Boim, 2008)
- Imaoto with Klaus Filip (Erstwhile, 2009)
- Goat Vs Donkey with Taku Unami (Taumaturgia, 2009)
- Himmelgeister 19 (B-Boim, 2010)
- Cafe Oto 1 (B-Boim, 2010)
- Darenootodesuka (B-Boim, 2012)
- Untitled with Taku Unami (Erstwhile, 2012)
- Ruten (B-Boim, 2014)
- II with Jurg Frey (Erstwhile, 2014)
- One Man and a Fly (Cathnor, 2015)

=== As sideman ===
With Elton Dean

- Happy Daze (Ogun, 1977)
- Live at the BBC (Hux, 2003)
- Ninesense Suite (Jazzwerkstatt 2011)
- The 100 Club Concert 1979 (Reel 2012)

With Barry Guy & London Jazz Composers' Orchestra

- Zurich Concerts (Intakt, 1988)
- Harmos (Intakt, 1989)
- Double Trouble (Intakt, 1990)
- Theoria (Intakt, 1992)
- Portraits (Intakt, 1994)
- Study II & Stringer (Intakt, 2005)

With Chris McGregor

- Live at Willisau (Ogun, 1974)
- Procession (Ogun, 1978)
- Yes Please (In and Out 1981)
- Bremen to Bridgwater (Cuneiform, 2004)

With Burkhard Stangl

- Ereignislose Musik Loose Music (Random Acoustics, 1996)
- Venusmond Oper Als Topos (Quell, 2000)
- Hommage a Moi (Loewenhertz 2011)

With others

- Antoine Beuger, Cantor Quartets (Another Timbre 2013)
- Andrea Centazzo, Doctor Faustus (Ictus, 2006)
- Malcolm Goldstein, A Sounding of Sources (New World, 2008)
- Sven-Ake Johansson, Sven-Ake Johansson Mit Dem NMUI Im SO 36 '79 (FMP, 1987)
- Franz Koglmann, The Use of Memory (hat ART, 1991)
- Steve Lacy, Itinerary (hat ART, 1991)
- Joe McPhee, Topology (Hat Hut 1981)
- Joe McPhee, The Loneliest Woman (Corbett vs Dempsey 2012)
- Louis Moholo, Spirits Rejoice! (Ogun, 1978)
- Louis Moholo, Bra Louis Bra Tebs & Spirits Rejoice! (Ogun, 2006)
- Michael Pisaro, Nature Denatured and Found Again (Gravity Wave 2019)
- Polwechsel, Polwechsel (Random Acoustics, 1995)
- Soft Heap, Soft Heap (Charly, 1979)
- Mattin, Whitenoise (w.m.o/r, 2004)
- Taku Sugimoto, Quartet / Octet (Slubmusic Tengu, 2014)
- Gary Windo, His Master's Bones (Cuneiform, 1996)
