= Veress =

Veress is a surname. Notable people with the surname include:

- Lajos Veress (1889–1976), Hungarian military officer
- Matyas Veress, film editor
- Sándor Veress (1907–1992), Hungarian-born Swiss composer
- Zsuzsanna Veress (born 1976), Hungarian handball player
- János Veres(s) (1903–1979), a Hungarian internist

== See also ==
- Veress needle, surgical instrument
