= Boustrophedon (album) =

Live album by Evan Parker
- Released: 2008
- Recorded: September 2004
- Venue: Muffathalle; Munich, Germany
- Genre: Jazz
- Length: 59:15
- Label: ECM; ECM 1873
- Producer: Steve Lake

Evan Parker chronology
Topos (2007)	Boustrophedon (2008)	Free Zone Appleby 2007 (2008)

Boustrophedon is a live album by free jazz saxophonist and composer Evan Parker and the Transatlantic Art Ensemble, featuring Roscoe Mitchell, recorded in Germany in September 2004 and released on ECM in 2008.

== Background ==
The album came about when, in 2003, Munich's cultural attaché contacted ECM and inquired as to which musicians might be appropriate for a symposium focusing on improvisation as part of the compositional process. ECM recommended Parker and Roscoe Mitchell, and the two were then commissioned to prepare music for an ensemble which would be hand-picked by the two of them, for concerts to be held in Munich in September 2004. The ensemble heard on the recording, referred to as the "Transatlantic Art Ensemble", consisted of players from the U.S. and U.K. drawn from Parker's Electro-Acoustic Ensemble, members of which can be heard on the ECM recordings The Eleventh Hour and The Moment's Energy, and Mitchell's Note Factory group, members of which also appear on the ECM recordings Nine to Get Ready and Far Side. The Transatlantic Art Ensemble can also be heard on the Mitchell album Composition/Improvisation Nos. 1, 2 & 3, which was recorded as part of the same symposium, and which serves as a companion to Parker's album.

Each of the work's six "Furrows" (the title Boustrophedon translates as "like an ox plowing") presents the performers with "a combination of detailed written music for the players, specific performance instructions and 'open' areas." Parker commented that he wanted to explore a musical space "between Gil Evans and Luigi Nono", and stated: "I wanted to use some of the big chords that Slonimsky talks about: all these very big all-interval structures."

== Reception ==
Professional ratings
Review scores
Source	Rating
AllMusic	3.5/5 stars
The Guardian	4/5 stars

The AllMusic review by Thom Jurek awarded the album 3½ stars stating "This music is not jazz -- free or otherwise -- nor is it merely classical formalism or improvisation deconstruction. Instead, Parker's compositions are scored with the idea of bringing together, through his very European outlook, the different ways region, distance, cultural difference, and discipline combine to make something else: a new work that maintains an identity that is transcultural and trans-aesthetic".

Writing for The Guardian, John Fordham praised "the seamless joining of conventionally tonal music (even some jazzy phrasing and riffing) with a spikier vocabulary and some startling solos from all across the contemporary-music soundscape" and called the album "a triumph for Parker, who's known a few in his revolutionary career."

In a review for All About Jazz, Budd Kopman wrote: "What is fascinating is how expertly Parker has merged composition... with improvisation... As the music unfolds, and the individual parts and lines in varying registers come together, the result sounds directed and controlled, hence composed. However, each particular part, when listened to in isolated concentration, sounds very free (within the constraints of the surrounding music) and, hence, improvised... With Boustrophedon Parker presents music that defies categorization and gives meaning to space and time during its duration."

== Track listing ==
All compositions by Evan Parker

1. "Overture" – 1:21
2. "Furrow 1" – 8:09
3. "Furrow 2" – 5:46
4. "Furrow 3" – 11:07
5. "Furrow 4" – 5:21
6. "Furrow 5" – 8:20
7. "Furrow 6" – 12:52
8. "Finale" – 6:19

== Personnel ==
=== The Transatlantic Art Ensemble ===
- Evan Parker – soprano saxophone
- Roscoe Mitchell – alto saxophone, soprano saxophone
- Anders Svanoe – alto saxophone
- John Rangecroft – clarinet
- Neil Metcalfe – flute
- Corey Wilkes – trumpet, flugelhorn
- Nils Bultmann – viola
- Philipp Wachsmann – violin
- Marcio Mattos – cello
- Craig Taborn – piano
- Barry Guy, Jaribu Shahid – bass
- Paul Lytton, Tanni Tabbal – drums, percussion
