= Live at the Royal Festival Hall =

Live at the Royal Festival Hall may refer to:

- Live at the Royal Festival Hall (Neil Sedaka album), 1974
- Live at the Royal Festival Hall (Glen Campbell album), 1977
- Live at the Royal Festival Hall (Jaki Byard and Howard Riley album), 1984
- Live at the Royal Festival Hall (John McLaughlin Trio album), recorded 1989 and released 1990
- Live at the Royal Festival Hall (Dizzy Gillespie album), 1989

== See also ==
- Royal Festival Hall Live – June 10th 2001, an album by Roy Harper
