= Composition/Improvisation Nos. 1, 2 & 3 =

Live album by Roscoe Mitchell
- Released: 2007
- Recorded: September 2004
- Venue: Munich, Germany
- Genre: Jazz
- Label: ECM; ECM 1872

Roscoe Mitchell chronology
No Side Effects (2006)	Composition/Improvisation Nos. 1, 2 & 3 (2007)	Contact (2009)

Composition/Improvisation Nos. 1, 2 & 3 is a live album by jazz saxophonist and composer Roscoe Mitchell recorded in Germany in September 2004 and released on ECM in 2007.

== Background ==
The album came about when, in 2003, Munich's cultural attaché contacted ECM and inquired as to which musicians might be appropriate for a symposium focusing on improvisation as part of the compositional process. ECM recommended Mitchell and Evan Parker, and the two were then commissioned to prepare music for an ensemble which would be hand-picked by the two of them, for concerts to be held in Munich in September 2004. The ensemble heard on the recording, referred to as the "Transatlantic Art Ensemble", consisted of players from the U.S. and U.K. drawn from Mitchell's Note Factory group, members of which also appear on the ECM recordings Nine to Get Ready and Far Side, and Parker's Electro-Acoustic Ensemble, members of which can be heard on the ECM recordings The Eleventh Hour and The Moment's Energy. The Transatlantic Art Ensemble can also be heard on the Parker album Boustrophedon, which was recorded as part of the same symposium, and which serves as a companion to Mitchell's album.

The album presents nine scenes from Mitchell's "Composition/Improvisation Nos. 1, 2 & 3": Parts I, II, V, VI, VII, and IX were derived from "Composition/Improvisation 2", Parts VIII and IV from "Composition/Improvisation 1", and Part III from "Composition/Improvisation 3". Some sections of the work are fully notated, while others present a "calibrated freedom extended variously to individual musicians, sub-groups of players, or the entire ensemble." According to Mitchell,

For the symposium in Munich, I devised three methods of improvisation with composition. One method involved each player getting a part and also six cards with scored improvisation on them. One piece used a limited number of notes, and I asked the players to use only those notes for improvisation. And for the third piece, I asked players to select their information from the composition and construct improvisation based on that.”

== Reception ==
Professional ratings
Review scores
Source	Rating
Penguin Guide to Jazz	4/4 stars
AllMusic	4/5 stars
The Guardian	3/5 stars

The authors of The Penguin Guide to Jazz awarded the album 4 stars and selected it as part of their suggested Core Collection. Thom Jurek, in a review for AllMusic, awarded the album 4 stars, commenting that the music sounds "more like contemporary classical music; space is at a premium as strings, piano, and the roll of a timpani usher in the proceedings. There's no fire breathing here; it's all of a piece, restrained yet relaxed, full of mystery and deliberation... when it's done, it feels finished but somehow not truly ended, as if there is an open space of indeterminate length to recall the experience of what one has just heard and carve a place for it in the space of each listener's chamber of sound and echo, endlessly falling, a phrase, a note, and engagement at a time into silence."

Writing for The Guardian, John Fordham stated: "Mitchell has said he has dreamed of 'an ensemble of improvising musicians with an orchestral range' and he has it here – but if large-ensemble improv music suggests a dissonant turmoil, this is a contemporary music (frequently classical-sounding) of rich sonority, plenty of contrast, and patient development... If this is still something of a specialised choice, it's a beautifully recorded and unusually varied one."

In a review for All About Jazz, Marc Medwin called the album "a triumph of stunning solo work and monumental group interplay that crosses and recrosses boundaries as it proceeds", and stated: "Like Boulez' structures of the '50s and '60s, Mitchell's nine-part suite... are sequenced out of order, putting a stranglehold on any conventional grasp of temporality. The music itself bolsters the illusion, long passages of post-Webern pointillism superimposed over Varèse-ian shocks and bursts, all underpinned by the pulsing shadow of Ligeti... With Mitchell exploring such fertile avenues, any guess at future plans would be folly. May he continue in whatever direction his muse leads him." In a separate review for the same publication, Budd Kopman wrote: "Roscoe Mitchell has long worked in the space where the composed and the improvised coexist and merge. Composition/Improvisation Nos. 1, 2 & 3 is a glorious example of music that expertly combines the strengths of both... a moving experience."

In an article for The Nation, Brian Morton stated that "The immediate feel... is very much of a classical group, with strings, tymps and piano, generating a sound-world that makes one think first of European art music," and called the ending "deliciously ambiguous," writing: "Far from reaching a climax, the sequence dissolves into a shimmer, as if some tiny subset of the whole cosmological process has gone into reverse, solids turning to gas, orbits no longer regular or fixed, location and velocity uncertain. Nothing in the whole canon of twentieth-century Western art music conveys so much satisfying mystery."

Commenting on both Mitchell's album and Parker's Boustrophedon, Tyran Grillo wrote: "The sense of flow imparted by the compositional elements in both albums is breathtaking, building textures organically and never indulging in extremes for too long. Rather, the continuity lies somewhere in the shadows, balancing on the fulcrum of surrender between static and whisper. In the end, such teetering of intuition becomes a way of life, a mantra for those whose ears flower with curiosity."

== Track listing ==
All compositions by Roscoe Mitchell

1. "Movement I" – 13:36
2. "Movement II" – 4:07
3. "Movement III" – 18:35
4. "Movement IV" – 5:42
5. "Movement V" – 3:54
6. "Movement VI" – 3:17
7. "Movement VII" – 9:12
8. "Movement VIII" – 14:48
9. "Movement IX" – 5:57

== Personnel ==
- Roscoe Mitchell – soprano saxophone
- Evan Parker – tenor saxophone, soprano saxophone
- Anders Svanoe – alto saxophone, baritone saxophone
- Corey Wilkes – trumpet, flugelhorn
- John Rangecroft – clarinet
- Neil Metcalfe – flute
- Nils Bultmann – viola
- Philipp Wachsmann – violin
- Marcio Mattos – cello
- Craig Taborn – piano
- Barry Guy, Jaribu Shahid – bass
- Paul Lytton, Tani Tabbal – drums, percussion
