= Philipp Wachsmann =

British jazz violinist (born 1944)

Philipp John Paul Wachsmann
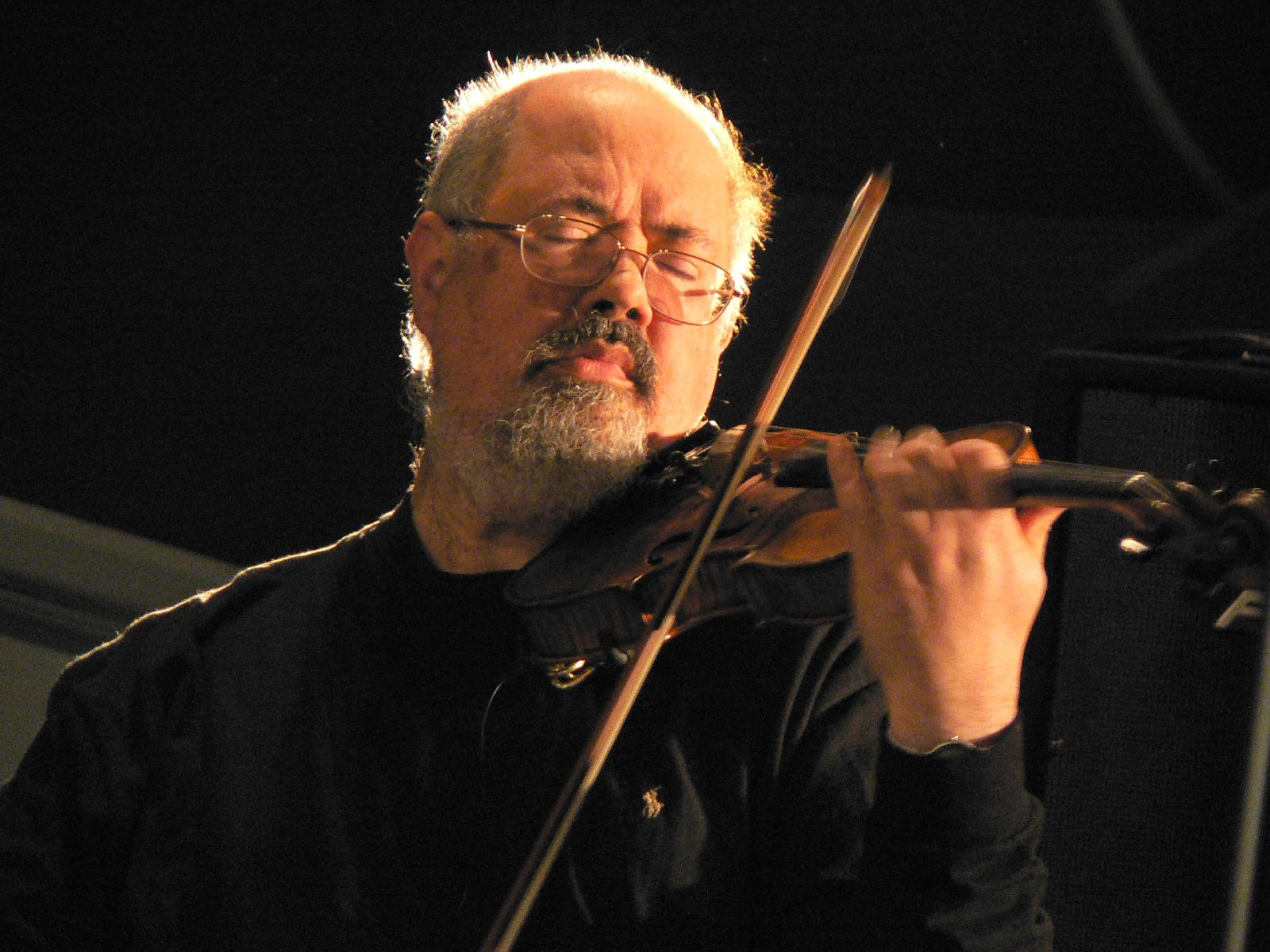

Background information
- Born: 5 August 1944 (age 82); Kampala, Uganda
- Genres: Avant-garde jazz, jazz fusion, free jazz, electronica
- Occupations: Violinist, composer
- Instrument: Violin

Philipp John Paul Wachsmann (born 5 August 1944) is a British avant-garde jazz/ jazz fusion violinist born in Kampala, Uganda, known for having founded his own group Chamberpot.

He has worked with many musicians in the free jazz idiom, including Tony Oxley, Fred van Hove, Barry Guy, Derek Bailey and Paul Rutherford, among many others. Wachsmann is especially known for playing within the electronica idiom.

== Discography ==
- Chamberpot with Richard Beswick, Simon Mayo, Tony Wren (Bead, 1976)
- Sparks of the Desire Magneto with Richard Beswick, Tony Wren (Bead, 1977)
- Improvisations Are Forever Now (Vinyl Records, 1978)
- For Harm with Harry de Wit (Bead, 1979)
- Hello Brenda! with Richard Beswick (Bead, 1981)
- Writing in Water (Bead, 1985)
- Ellispontos (J.n.d., 1986)
- The Glider & The Grinder with Tony Oxley (Bead, 1987)
- Eleven Years from Yesterday with Peter Jacobsen, Ian Brighton, Marcio Mattos, Trevor Taylor (Bead, 1988)
- Icarus with MarkRoger, Curphy Wastell, Carol Ann Jackson, Trevor Taylor (FMR, 1995)
- Some Other Season with Paul Lytton (ECM, 1999)
- August Steps with Teppo Hauta-Aho (Bead, 2000)
- Wazahugy with Charlotte Hug, Ivar Grydeland & Ingar Zach (Sofa, 2002)
- The Needles with Evan Parker, Teppo Hauta-aho (Leo, 2002)
- Floating Phantoms with Tony Oxley and the B.I.M.P. Quartet (a/l/l, 2002)
- Refractions in Air with Michael Bunce (Bead, 2003)
- Zero Plus with Aurora Josephson, Jacob Lindsay, Damon Smith, Martin Blume (Balance Point Acoustics, 2003)
- 888 with Evan Parker, Hugh Davies, Eddie Prevost (FMR, 2003)
- Apparitions with Stan Adler, Paul Chauncy, Jon Lloyd, Rob Palmer (Leo, 2004)
- Free Zone Appleby 2003 with Tony Coe, John Edwards, Alan Hacker, Sylvia Hallett, Marcio Mattos, Evan Parker, Kenny Wheeler (psi, 2004)
- Startle the Echoes with Matthew Hutchinson (Bead, 2004)
- Expanded Botanics with Peter Ole Jorgensen, Jakob Riis (Ninth World Music, 2004)
- Free Zone Appleby 2004 with Evan Parker, Barry Guy, Paul Lytton, Joel Ryan (psi, 2005)
- Free Zone Appleby 2005 with Evan Parker, Kenny Wheeler, Gerd Dudek, Paul Dunmall, Paul Rogers, John Edwards, Tony Marsh, Tony Levin (psi, 2006)
- Pacific 2003 with Martin Blume (Bead, 2005)
- Cinc with Paul Lytton, Ken Vandermark (Okka Disk, 2006)
- Refugium with Jorgensen, Riis (Ninth World Music, 2006)
- Free Zone Appleby 2006 with Evan Parker, Rudi Mahall, Aki Takase, Alexander von Schlippenbach, Paul Rutherford, Paul Lovens (psi, 2007)
- St. Cyprians 3 with Howard Riley, Tony Wren (FMR, 2012)
- Gateway '97 with Turner, Thomas, Frangenheim (Creative Sources, 2013)
- Berlin Kinesis with Turner, Thomas, Frangenheim (Creative Sources, 2015)
- Alizarin with Roger Turner (Bead, 2015)
- Imagined Time with Paul Lytton (Bead, 2016)
- Garuda with Lawrence Casserley (Bead, 2016) Emil Strandberg
- A Trust in the Uncertain and a [Willingness to Be Exposed with, Sten Sandell, Patric Thorman (Found You, 2017)
- Reunion Live from Cafe Oto with Evan Parker, John Russell, Ian Brighton, Marcio Mattos, Trevor Taylor (FMR, 2017)

With Barry Guy's London Jazz Composers' Orchestra

- Stringer (Four Pieces for Orchestra) (FMP, 1983)
- Zurich Concerts (Intakt, 1987–88)
- Harmos (Intakt, 1989)
- Double Trouble (Intakt, 1990)
- Study II (Intakt, 1991)
- Theoria (Intakt, 1991)
- Portraits (Intakt, 1993)
- Three Pieces for Orchestra (Intakt, 1995)
- Double Trouble Two (Intakt, 1998)
- Radio Rondo/Schaffhausen Concert (Intakt, 2009)

With Paul Lytton

- The Balance of Trade (CIMP, 1996)

With Roscoe Mitchell

- Composition/Improvisation Nos. 1, 2 & 3 (ECM, 2004)

With Tony Oxley

- February Papers (Incus, 1977; Discus, 2020)
- A Birthday Tribute: 75 years (Incus, 2013) recorded in 1977 and 1993
- Unreleased 1974–2016 (Discus, 2022) recorded in 1974, 1981, and 2016

With the Tony Oxley Celebration Orchestra

- The Enchanted Messenger (Soul Note, 1995)

With Evan Parker

- Toward the Margins (ECM, 1996)
- Drawn Inward (ECM, 1998)
- Memory/Vision (ECM, 2002)
- Boustrophedon (ECM, 2004)
- The Moment's Energy (ECM, 2007)

== See also ==
- Rez Abbasi
- Arooj Aftab
- Rambo Amadeus
- Core Atoms
- David Axelrod (musician)
- Louis Banks
- Ray Barretto
