= Harmos =

Studio album by Barry Guy and the London Jazz Composers' Orchestra
- Released: 1989
- Recorded: April 4–5, 1989
- Studio: Radio Studio DRS, Zürich, Switzerland
- Genre: Free jazz
- Length: 43:48
- Label: Intakt; CD 013
- Producer: Patrik Landolt, Rosmarie A. Meier

Barry Guy and the London Jazz Composers' Orchestra chronology
Zurich Concerts (1988)	Harmos (1989)	Double Trouble (1990)

Harmos is an album by Barry Guy and the London Jazz Composers' Orchestra that features a recording of a large-scale, 44-minute composition by Guy. It was recorded in April 1989, just before the LJCO's 20th anniversary, in Zürich, Switzerland, and was released later that year by Intakt Records. Guy interpreted the Greek title in its original meaning of "coming together," and the work attempts to find solutions to the challenges surrounding the coexistence of improvisation and composition.

In a retrospective interview, Guy recalled the LJCO's financial difficulties, and reflected: "Luckily, things went very well for me in the baroque music business. I bought instruments, strings and bows so that I could perform the Mozart symphonies as adequately as possible. And when I needed money for improvised music, I'd sell one or two instruments. The first CD I made for Intakt, Harmos, was financed by selling one of my basses."

A version of "Harmos" also appears on the 2001 trio recording Odyssey with Guy, Marilyn Crispell, and Paul Lytton. In 2012, Intakt released a DVD documenting a live performance of the work by the LJCO.

== Reception ==
Professional ratings
Review scores
Source	Rating
AllMusic	4/5 stars
The Penguin Guide to Jazz	4/4 stars

In a review for AllMusic, Thom Jurek called the piece "a work of deft imagination, powerful technique, and wild interplay," and wrote: "The most beautiful thing about Guy is that as a composer he is not hung up on resolution, he's more concerned with the notion that everything in the palette be viewed, everything that's in the box should be rolled out and put on display. If a particular series of ideas do resolve themselves timbrally or in modal invention that's fine, but it's not necessarily the end intent."

The authors of The Penguin Guide to Jazz Recordings awarded the album a full 4 stars, and stated that the recording confirms "what was to become a regular feature of Guy's LJCO work, a mutuality of effort between a single solo voice and the ensemble."

Writer John Corbett described the album as "the band's most consummate disc," and "a sparkling recording that can serve as a smart way to ease a neophyte into the pleasures of improvised music and satisfy the appetites of devoted free fans as well."

== Track listing ==
1. "Harmos" (Barry Guy) – 43:48

== Personnel ==
- Barry Guy – bass, conductor
- Evan Parker – reeds
- Paul Dunmall – reeds
- Peter McPhail – reeds
- Simon Picard – reeds
- Trevor Watts – reeds
- Henry Lowther – trumpet
- Jon Corbett – trumpet
- Marc Charig – cornet
- Alan Tomlinson – trombone
- Paul Rutherford – trombone
- Radu Malfatti – trombone
- Steve Wick – tuba
- Philipp Wachsmann – violin
- Barre Phillips – bass
- Howard Riley – piano
- Paul Lytton – drums
