= The Balance of Trade =

Studio album by Paul Lytton
- Released: 1996
- Recorded: May 15 and 16, 1996
- Studio: The Spirit Room, Rossie, New York
- Genre: Free jazz
- Label: CIMP; 114

The Balance of Trade is an album by drummer and electronic musician Paul Lytton. It was recorded in May 1996 at The Spirit Room in Rossie, New York, and was released later that year by the CIMP label. On the album, Lytton is joined by trumpeter Herb Robertson, violinist Philipp Wachsmann, and bassist Dominic Duval.

== Reception ==
Professional ratings
Review scores
Source	Rating
The Penguin Guide to Jazz	3.5/4 stars

The authors of the Penguin Guide to Jazz Recordings awarded the album 3 1/2 stars, calling it "visionary in scope." They noted that Lytton's gigantic drum kit "apparently took several hours to set up," although he used it "as sparsely as possible" in the context of the recording. They wrote: "each [piece] seems to last as long as it ought to, or has to... Nobody has ever used electronics in the way [Lytton] does; in fact, it's hard to hear how his electronics even affect the music." They concluded by describing the album as being "about as difficult as it gets."

Bill Shoemaker, writing for Jazz Times, called the album "challenging," and commented: "The quartet works with the aural equivalent of sub-atomic particles, realigning bits of texture into startling new configurations. Rather than emphasize virtuosity, the work taxes the musicians' ability to build upon emerging forms with tenuously defined materials. It's a cliché to say that such albums reward committed listening, but, in the case of The Balance of Trade, it's true."

== Track listing ==
1. "Frames of Mind" – 2:45
2. "Diagonals" – 19:34
3. "Frogger's Lament" – 6:13
4. "Gong" – 7:56
5. "Ella's Dance" – 1:45
6. "Flitters" – 10:27
7. "Panade" – 2:25
8. "Bach Goes to Redwood" – 6:23
9. "For Breakfast I Eat..." – 9:15

== Personnel ==
- Paul Lytton – percussion, electronics
- Herb Robertson – cornet, trumpet, trombone, tuba, horn
- Philipp Wachsmann – violin, viola, electronics
- Dominic Duval – bass, electronics
