= Theoria (album) =

1992 jazz studio album by Barry Guy

Studio album by Barry Guy and the London Jazz Composers' Orchestra with Irène Schweizer
- Released: 1992
- Recorded: February 1991
- Studio: Radio Studio DRS, Zürich, Switzerland
- Genre: Free jazz
- Length: 57:49
- Label: Intakt; CD 024
- Producer: Patrik Landolt

Barry Guy and the London Jazz Composers' Orchestra chronology
Double Trouble (1990)	Theoria (1992)	Portraits (1993)

Theoria is an album by Barry Guy and the London Jazz Composers' Orchestra, with pianist Irène Schweizer as soloist. Documenting a large-scale, 58-minute composition by Guy, it was recorded in February 1991 in Zürich, Switzerland, and was released in 1992 by Intakt Records. The work is basically a concerto for Schweizer, and was presented in honor of her 50th birthday.

Theoria, which was commissioned by Fabrikjazz, based in Rote Fabrik, Zürich, was premiered on February 17, 1991, at a concert organized by Rote Fabrik in collaboration with à-suivre-Basel (Kulturwerkstatt Kaserne) and Mühle Hunziken in Rubigen, in the canton of Bern. As with many of Guy's compositions, the work attempts to find solutions to the challenges surrounding the coexistence of improvisation and composition. In the score, the starting and ending points for soloists are precisely demarcated, allowing the musicians a considerable amount of freedom within a fixed structure. Schweizer recalled: "I had to read at times, but actually my part was free, I had a lot of room for improvisation. Mainly I had to know where to come in."

== Reception ==
Professional ratings
Review scores
Source	Rating
AllMusic	4.5/5 stars
The Penguin Guide to Jazz	4/4 stars

In a review for AllMusic, Thom Jurek wrote: "This may be Guy's masterpiece in that here he has reached, finally, the perfect balance of incorporating all of his obsessions into one work: classical music, particularly the Romantic period, free jazz, new music, big band swing, blues, and soundtrack scores... Guy's entire sonic world opens up in color, tone, shade, and nuanced beauty. It is beyond language to interpret its effect, but its organization is so complex, so righteously taut with ideas and combinations of harmonic and contrapuntal interconnectedness it just boggles the mind even when looking at the score."

The authors of The Penguin Guide to Jazz Recordings wrote: "Guy attempts not to juxtapose blandly different styles of playing, but to overlap them creatively, creating diffraction patterns and points of maximum energy. In an orchestra of soloists, Schweizer stands out clearly but does not dominate; what happens is that her improvisations become the constituent elements of other musicians' activity."

== Track listing ==
1. "Theoria" (Barry Guy) – 57:50

== Personnel ==
- Barry Guy – bass, conductor
- Irène Schweizer – piano
- Henry Lowther – trumpet
- Jon Corbett – trumpet
- Marc Charig – cornet
- Conrad Bauer – trombone
- Radu Malfatti – trombone
- Alan Tomlinson – trombone
- Steve Wick – tuba
- Trevor Watts – reeds
- Evan Parker – reeds
- Simon Picard – reeds
- Peter McPhail – reeds
- Paul Dunmall – reeds
- Philipp Wachsmann – violin
- Barre Phillips – bass
- Paul Lytton – drums
