= Howard Riley (musician) =

English pianist (1943–2025)

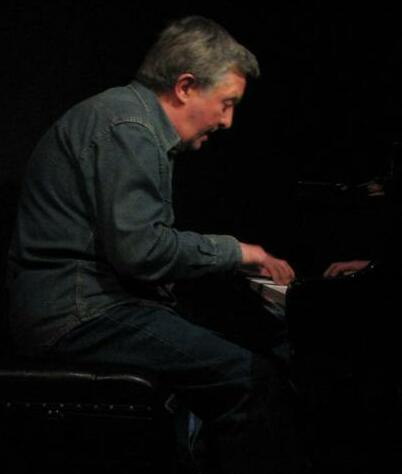
- Riley performing in 2008

Background information
- Born: John Howard Riley; 16 February 1943; Huddersfield, Yorkshire, England
- Died: 8 February 2025 (aged 81) Beckenham, Greater London, England
- Genre: Jazz
- Occupation: Musician
- Instrument: Piano
- Years active: 1960s–2024
- Label: Turtle
- Partner: Annie Garrett 1996-2025

John Howard Riley (16 February 1943 – 8 February 2025) was an English pianist and composer who worked in the jazz and experimental music idioms.

== Life and career ==
Riley was born in Huddersfield, Yorkshire, England on 16 February 1943. He was the elder son of Marjorie (nee Emmott), a secretary, and her husband, John Riley, an engineer and part-time dance band leader. Like his brother Paul, Howard received piano lessons from his father. He began learning the piano at the age of six, and began playing jazz as early as the age of 13. He studied at the University of Wales (1961–66), Indiana University School of Music in America under David Baker (1966–67), and then at York University (1967–70).

Alongside his studies he played jazz professionally, with Evan Parker (1966) and then with his own trio (1967–76), with Barry Guy on bass and Alan Jackson, Jon Hiseman, and Tony Oxley for periods on drums. Additionally he worked with John McLaughlin (1968), the London Jazz Composers Orchestra (1970–1980s), and with Oxley's ensemble (1972–81). He and Guy worked in a trio with Phil Wachsmann from 1976 well into the 1980s, and played solo piano throughout North America and Europe. From 1978 to 1981, he played in a quartet with Guy, Trevor Watts, and John Stevens; in the early 1980s he did duo work with Keith Tippett, with Jaki Byard, and with Elton Dean. From 1985 he worked in a trio with Jeff Clyne and Tony Levin.

Riley taught at the Guildhall School of Music and Drama and at the Goldsmiths, University of London, having started his tenure during the 1970s.

Riley died in at Beckenham, London on 8 February 2025, shortly before his 82nd birthday. He had suffered from Parkinson's, and had lived in a care home for almost three years, where a piano was available. His partner of 29 years was Annie Garrett, a former actor and drama teacher, who helped set up the Brit school, and he had three stepchildren.

== Discography ==
=== As sideman ===
With Barry Guy/The London Jazz Composers' Orchestra

- 1972 Ode (Incus)
- 1988 Zurich Concerts (Intakt)
- 1989 Harmos (Intakt)
- 1990 Double Trouble (Intakt)

With Paul Rutherford and Iskra 1912

- 1997 Sequences 72 & 73 (Emanem)

=== As leader, solo ===
- 1968 Discussions (Opportunity)
- 1969 Angle (CBS)
- 1970 The Day Will Come (CBS)
- 1971 Flight (Turtle)
- 1974 Synopsis (Incus)
- 1977 Shaped (Music for Solo Piano) (Mosaic)
- 1977 Intertwine (Music for Two Pianos) (Mosaic)
- 1978 The Toronto Concert (Vinyl Records)
- 1979 The Other Side (Spotlite)
- 1982 Duality (View)
- 1984 For Four on Two Two (Affinity)
- 1985 In Focus with Keith Tippett (Affinity)
- 1987 Live at the Royal Festival Hall with Jaki Byard (Leo)
- 1990 Procession (Wondrous Music)
- 1993 Beyond Category (Wondrous)
- 1993 The Heat of Moments (Wondrous)
- 1994 The Bern Concert with Keith Tippett (FMR)
- 1995 Wishing on the Moon with Castronari, Marsh (FMR)
- 1997 Inner Minor (ASC)
- 1998 Making Notes (Slam)
- 1999 Short Stories
- 1999 One to One with Elton Dean (Slam)
- 2001 First Encounter with Keith Tippett (Jazzprint; recorded 1981)
- 2001 Singleness (Jazzprint; recorded 1974)
- 2001 Trisect (Jazzprint)
- 2001 Air Play (Slam)
- 2001 Overground (Emanem; recorded 1974–1975)
- 2002 Organic with Barry Guy, John Stevens (Jazzprint)
- 2002 Four in the Afternoon with Larry Stabbins, Mark Sanders, Tony Wren (Emanem)
- 2003 Another Part of the Story with Keith Tippett, John Tilbury (Emanem)
- 2003 Duology with Lol Coxhill (Slam)
- 2004 Pianoforte with Keith Tippett, Grew, Thomas (Slam)
- 2005 At Lincoln Cathedral (Heliopause)
- 2005 Consequences (33 Jazz)
- 2006 Four at St. Cyprians with Larry Stabbins, Mark Sanders, Tony Wren (FMR)
- 2006 Short Stories (Volume Two) (Slam)
- 2006 Two Is One (Emanem)
- 2009 The Monk & Ellington Sessions (33 Jazz)
- 2009 Three Is One (ASC)
- 2010 Solo in Vilnius (NoBusiness)
- 2011 The Complete Short Stories 1998–2010 (NoBusiness)
- 2012 St. Cyprians 2 with Larry Stabbins, Mark Sanders, Tony Wren (FMR)
- 2012 St. Cyprians 3 with Philipp Wachsmann, Tony Wren (FMR)
- 2013 Live with Repertoire (NoBusiness)
- 2014 To Be Continued (Slam)
- 2015 10.11.12 (NoBusiness)
- 2015 R&B with Jaki Byard (Slam)
- 2015 Discussions with Trio (Dusk Fire)
- 2016 Constant Change 1976–2016 (NoBusiness)
- 2018 Live in the USA (NoBusiness)
- 2018 Listen to Hear (Slam)
- 2020 More Listening, More Hearing (Slam)
- 2022 Journal Four with Keith Tippett (NoBusiness)
- 2022 Unreleased 1974–2016 with Tony Oxley (Discus)

== Other sources ==
- Ed Hazell, "Howard Riley". The New Grove Dictionary of Jazz.
