= Angle (album) =

Studio album by Howard Riley
- Released: 1969
- Recorded: 3 December 1968; 2 January 1969; London
- Genre: Jazz
- Length: 40:10
- Label: CBS
- Producer: David Howells

Howard Riley chronology
Discussions (1968)	Angle (1969)	The Day Will Come (1970)

Angle is an album by English jazz pianist Howard Riley, which was released on CBS in 1969 as part of their Realm Jazz Series, and reissued on CD by Columbia in 1999. It features his working trio of that period, with bassist Barry Guy and drummer Alan Jackson. The fully notated "Three Fragments" is a flute-piano duet with Barbara Thompson.

== Reception ==
Professional ratings
Review scores
Source	Rating
The Penguin Guide to Jazz	3.5/4 stars

The Penguin Guide to Jazz notes that "Riley is the only credited composer on the album, which perhaps accounts for its thoughtful and rather reserved character."

In a review for Record Collector, Ian McCann stated that the "rhythm section, Barry Guy and Alan Jackson, are deeply in sync... Angle's lengthy title track fits its name, all pointed turns; 'Gormenghast'... is agreeably dense; 'Gill' lets gospel back into the music, then leads it astray; 'Fragment' is beautifully tender and complex; the twisted 'Three Fragments' adds Barbara Thompson's eerie flute."

== Track listing ==
All compositions by Howard Riley

1. "Exit" – 5:00
2. "Gormenghast" – 7:02
3. "S&S" – 2:15
4. "Fragment" – 7:40
5. "Angle" – 7:10
6. "Aftermath" – 2:30
7. "Three Fragments" – 2:51
8. "Gill" – 5:42

== Personnel ==
- Howard Riley – piano
- Barry Guy – bass
- Alan Jackson – drums
- Barbara Thompson – flute on 7
