= Radio Rondo/Schaffhausen Concert =

Live album by Barry Guy London Jazz Composers Orchestra with Irène Schweizer
- Released: 15 October 2009
- Recorded: 21 May 2008
- Venues: Schaffhauser Jazzfestival, Schaffhausen, Switzerland
- Genre: Free jazz
- Length: 45:26
- Labels: Intakt; CD 158

Barry Guy London Jazz Composers Orchestra chronology
Double Trouble Two (1998)	Radio Rondo/Schaffhausen Concert (2009)	That Time (2020)

Radio Rondo/Schaffhausen Concert is a live album by Barry Guy London Jazz Composers Orchestra with pianist Irène Schweizer. It was recorded on 21 May 2008, at the Schaffhauser Jazzfestival in Schaffhausen, Switzerland, and was released on 15 October 2009 through Intakt Records. The album features a 15-minute Schweizer solo followed by a 30-minute composition by Guy on which the pianist is featured.

== Reception ==
Professional ratings
Review scores
Source	Rating
The Guardian	3/5 stars
All About Jazz	4/5 stars
All About Jazz	4/5 stars
Tom Hull – on the Web	B+

In a review for The Guardian, John Fordham called Schweizer's solo "a dazzling exposition... in which her rhythmic precision and instinct for contrast unwrap a tour de force of post-Cecil Taylor free-jazz piano." Regarding "Radio Rondo," he wrote: "Schweizer drives clusters of low chords through the dialogue, and rich low sax sounds usher in a more lyrical section before scurrying orchestral motifs crowd around her. It must have been quite a show to witness."

Nic Jones of All About Jazz commented: "What makes the music notable is the degree to which it's reflective of fearsome intelligence at work," and praised Schweizer's playing, noting: "Her accommodation with the moment is entirely her own, and the same is true of the manner in which she not only conjures up an idea but also teases it out, wringing it out for telling effect. It seems like second nature for her to know exactly when it's outlived its usefulness." Concerning Guy's composition, he remarked: "At no point does the music congeal, despite the momentum of the piece being far from linear. Instead, it's the very discontinuities that are essential to this music's overall success, which in itself sets out a manifesto for its ongoing vitality."

Writing for Exclaim!, Glen Hall stated that "Schaffhausen Concert" is "constantly energetic, probing and bristling with lively thoughts" featuring "muscular chording, swirling single-note passages, often with jazzy implications that transform into new music comments from, say, David Tudor's vocabulary." He described "Radio Rondo" as "dramatic, structured and well realized," and "a strong foil for the intense pianist's improv skills."

In an article for Paris Transatlantic, Clifford Allen remarked: "Schweizer is one of the most lyrical of postwar European pianists, handling fleet action with glassine delicacy. Here, she's both orchestrator and orchestra." He noted that in relation to Guy's earlier piano concertos, "Radio Rondo" is "much more open-ended, though there's still a strong composerly sensibility in evidence," and wrote that it "hinges on contrasts between large masses of sound in either static or extremely vibrant motion, and smaller, sometimes hushed group interplay, frequently with Schweizer at the center."

== Track listing ==
1. "Schaffhausen Concert" (Irène Schweizer) – 15:25
2. "Radio Rondo" (Barry Guy) – 30:01

== Personnel ==
- Barry Guy – bass, conductor
- Irène Schweizer – piano
- Evan Parker – reeds
- Mats Gustafsson – reeds
- Peter McPhail – reeds
- Simon Picard – reeds
- Trevor Watts – reeds
- Henry Lowther – trumpet
- Herb Robertson – trumpet
- Rich Laughlin – trumpet
- Alan Tomlinson – trombone
- Conrad Bauer – trombone
- Johannes Bauer – trombone
- Per Åke Holmlander – tuba
- Philipp Wachsmann – violin
- Barre Phillips – bass
- Lucas Niggli – percussion
- Paul Lytton – percussion
