= Irvin's Comet =

Live album by Barry Guy
- Released: 2020
- Recorded: October 29, 2019
- Venue: MAMAstudios, Vilnius, Lithuania
- Genre: Free improvisation
- Label: NoBusiness Records; NBLP 137
- Producer: Danas Mikailionis, Valerij Anosov

Irvin's Comet is a live solo double bass album by Barry Guy. It was recorded on October 29, 2019, at the "Improdimensija" (Improdimension) concert series held at MAMAstudios in Vilnius, Lithuania, and was released on vinyl in 2020 by NoBusiness Records.

The album is named after a screenprint titled "Comet" by abstract expressionist artist Albert Irvin, part of which appears on the album cover.

== Reception ==
Professional ratings
Review scores
Source	Rating
All About Jazz	4/5 stars
The Free Jazz Collective	4/5 stars
Tom Hull – on the Web	B+

In a review for All About Jazz, John Sharpe wrote: "the focus zeroes in on [Guy's] rich personal vocabulary in which legitimate technique... allies to an enormous range of self-developed innovations, in which he utilizes brushes, sticks, metal rods and other implements in the pursuit of novel sounds... None of this would amount to more than an arid technical exhibition were it not combined with his acute composer's ear, which can impart a sense of form to the multiplicity of contrasts, juxtapositions and textures he generates." AAJ writer Mark Corroto commented: "Guy, playing solo, sans overdubs, can sound like an entire band, sometimes utilizing his patented arco and pizzicato techniques simultaneously. 'Oscillating' vibrates with bowed energy, sounding like an electronic intervention. The final two tracks... travel from gossamer chamber music to a punk demolition of sound."

The Free Jazz Collective's Martin Schray noted that Guy's "unique sense of form, sublime tone, and harmonic imagination take us on a gradually unfolding trip. The music seems to be in search of something as it turns in one direction, then another, and finally leads us to a goal... Guy continues to push the solo double bass genre into fresh, exciting territories. Irvin's Comet is highly recommended."

Andrey Henkin of The New York City Jazz Record included the album in his annual "Albums of the Year" list.

== Track listing ==
All compositions by Barry Guy. Track timings not provided.

1. "Comet"
2. "Ding Dang A Diggy Ding Dang"
3. "Closed Space"
4. "Oscillating"
5. "Old Earth Home"
6. "Barehead"

== Personnel ==
- Barry Guy – double bass
