= Birds and Blades =

Birds and Blades: Studio / Live

Studio album by Barry Guy and Evan Parker
- Released: 2003
- Recorded: September 6–7, 2002
- Venues: Sphères Bar Buch & Bühne, Zürich
- Studios: Radiostudio DRS, Zürich
- Genre: Free improvisation
- Length: 2:05:38
- Labels: Intakt; CD 080

Birds and Blades: Studio / Live is a two-CD album by double bassist Barry Guy and saxophonist Evan Parker. The first CD is a studio recording made on September 6, 2002, at Radiostudio DRS in Zürich, while the second CD is a live recording made on September 7, 2002, at Sphères Bar Buch & Bühne in Zürich. Celebrating the pair's musical friendship of more than 30 years, it was released by Intakt Records in 2003.

In an interview, Parker stated that he felt that he and Guy were "turning sunlight into music," and reflected: "Barry knows that the sun is always there, even when it's cloudy. He knows that source is there, so there's an energy coming from Barry, a delight in the activity of playing, regardless of the considerations of success and failure - just the activity of playing."

== Reception ==
Professional ratings
Review scores
Source	Rating
AllMusic	4/5 stars
The Penguin Guide to Jazz	3.5/4 stars

In a review for AllMusic, Thom Jurek wrote: "This is an exhilarating pair that, together, practices a kind of poetry of the infinite in their explorations. Far from difficult to listen to; if anything, this is so compelling one will want to repeat it."

The authors of The Penguin Guide to Jazz stated: "This is a remarkable encounter, new ground, a new intensity of expression from a pair of musicians who after 30 years might be thought to have exhausted each other's creative hydrogen entirely."

Writing for All About Jazz, Andrey Henkin called the album "a compelling document of two giants of their respective instruments," and commented: "The opportunity to hear improvised music in these two settings, recorded one day apart to maintain some continuity of theme, is unique and lends the recording an air of journal entries or correspondence reporting... Birds and Blades is a series of snapshots entered lovingly into Parker and Guy's decades-thick photo album."

The editors of The Wire included the album in their "2003 Rewind" listing the top 50 recordings of the year. The editors of All About Jazz also included it in their list of "Best New Releases of 2003."

== Track listing ==
CD 1 (studio)

1. "Alar" – 3:52
2. "Swordplay" – 10:27
3. "Cut and Thrust" – 6:41
4. "Froissement" – 11:33
5. "Coulé" – 5:44
6. "Barrage" – 5:37
7. "Birds and Blades" – 14:25

CD 2 (live)

1. "Angulation" – 19:03
2. "Circling" – 18:23
3. "Point in Line" – 14:06
4. "Lunge" – 15:47

== Personnel ==
- Barry Guy – double bass
- Evan Parker – soprano saxophone, tenor saxophone
