= The Eleventh Hour (Evan Parker album) =

Live album by Evan Parker Electro-Acoustic Ensemble
- Released: 2005
- Recorded: November 2004
- Venues: Centre for Contemporary Arts; Glasgow
- Genre: Jazz
- Length: 55:29
- Labels: ECM; ECM 1924
- Producer: Steve Lake

Evan Parker chronology
Set (2003)	The Eleventh Hour (2005)	Boustrophedon (2004)

Evan Parker Electro-Acoustic Ensemble chronology
Memory/Vision (2003)	The Eleventh Hour (2005)	The Moment's Energy (2009)

The Eleventh Hour is an album by British saxophonist and improvisor Evan Parker's Electro-Acoustic Ensemble recorded in November 2004 and released on ECM the following year.

== Reception ==
Professional ratings
Review scores
Source	Rating
AllMusic	4/5 stars
The Penguin Guide to Jazz Recordings	3.5/4 stars
All About Jazz #1	4/5 stars
All About Jazz #2	5/5 stars

The AllMusic review by Thom Jurek awarded the album 4 stars stating "There is a lot going on as violin, soprano saxophone, percussion, and piano all fall together, but as the sounds are treated and added to electronically, they have an air of space and separation that creates an immense space for the listener."

The authors of the Penguin Guide to Jazz Recordings wrote: "Eleventh Hour is a dark and foreboding work, packed with black energy... It's an astonishingly powerful record, and a perfect development to the language of this essential group."

Writing for All About Jazz, John Kelman commented: "While The Eleventh Hour is not an album for listeners tied to conventional musical approaches, it remains striking and strangely compelling, if for no other reason than it demonstrates just how far the creative mind can expand even well-established concepts into completely new territory." In a separate AAJ review, Chris May remarked: "It's not pure jazz, it's not pure electronica, and it's not pure conservatoire music either. It's something else again: fresh, vigorous, and very, very beautiful."

In a review for Clocks and Clouds, Beppe Colli stated: "With its excellent recorded sound, The Eleventh Hour could maybe in time reveal itself to be the best album that the ensemble has recorded to date."

== Track listing ==
All compositions by Evan Parker except as indicated

1. "Shadow Play" (Lawrence Casserley, Evan Parker, Walter Prati, Joel Ryan) – 17:29
2. "The Eleventh Hour Part 1" – 12:52
3. "The Eleventh Hour Part 2" – 9:33
4. "The Eleventh Hour Part 3" – 12:03
5. "The Eleventh Hour Part 4" – 15:33
6. "The Eleventh Hour Part 5" – 5:28

== Personnel ==
- Evan Parker – soprano saxophone, voice
- Philipp Wachsmann – violin, electronics
- Paul Lytton – percussion, electronics
- Agustí Fernandez – piano, prepared piano
- Adam Linson – double bass
- Lawrence Casserley – signal processing instrument, percussion, voice
- Joel Ryan – sample and signal processing
- Walter Prati – computer processing
- Richard Barrett – sampling keyboard, live electronics
- Paul Obermayer – sampling keyboard, live electronics
- Marco Vecchi – sound projection
