= Symmetries (album) =

Studio album by Barry Guy
- Released: 2002
- Recorded: July 2001
- Studio: New Hall, Camphill Community, Ballytobin, County Kilkenny, Ireland
- Genre: Free jazz
- Label: Maya Recordings; MCD0201
- Producer: Barry Guy, Maya Homburger, Nicholas Parker

Symmetries is a solo double bass album by Barry Guy. It was recorded in July 2001 in County Kilkenny, Ireland, and was released in 2002 by Maya Recordings.

== Reception ==
Professional ratings
Review scores
Source	Rating
AllMusic	4.5/5 stars
The Penguin Guide to Jazz	4/4 stars

In a review for AllMusic, François Couture wrote: "Symmetries is a treat. Guy has been sounding confident... for quite some time now. If his style has not changed much over the past decade, his output has remained consistently above average... Guy is a poet: his stunning technique goes by unnoticed, subsumed by the lyrical content and the pure musicality of his playing... he probably cannot surprise his fans anymore, but he sure can charm and impress. This album qualifies for both, making it a heartfelt recommendation."

The authors of the Penguin Guide to Jazz Recordings awarded the album 4 stars, and stated: "Barry's compositional touch and mastery of his instrument are now part of the same sweeping vision. He seems to deal in archetypes and universals."

Writing for All About Jazz, Mark Corroto commented: "On Symmetries [Guy] displays a total command of his instrument, working the top and bottom ends to great effect. Guy challenges his listeners with inventive methods of approaching sound and playing." Corroto described Guy's version of "Weird Nightmare" as "haunting and majestic."

== Track listing ==
"Weird Nightmare" and "Eclipse" composed by Charles Mingus. Remaining tracks composed by Barry Guy.

1. "Whether or Not Why Not" – 5:45
2. "Soft Fire" – 5:53
3. "Weird Nightmare" – 4:55
4. "Bichrome Terrors" – 10:38
5. "Quiescence (For K.B. And R.W.)" – 6:00
6. "Seven Fizzles: I" – 1:44
7. "Seven Fizzles: II" – 2:26
8. "Seven Fizzles: III" – 2:00
9. "Seven Fizzles: IV" – 1:23
10. "Seven Fizzles: V" – 1:55
11. "Seven Fizzles: VI" – 1:41
12. "Seven Fizzles: VII" – 1:36
13. "Odyssey" – 7:19
14. "Slow Slam" – 3:24
15. "Eclipse" – 2:55
16. "Dark of Light" – 4:53
17. "I Have Crossed by the Grace of the Boatman" – 5:05

== Personnel ==
- Barry Guy – bass
