= The Day Will Come =

The Day Will Come may refer to:

== Fiction ==
- The Day Will Come (2009 film), a German-French drama film
- The Day Will Come (2016 film), a Danish film
- The Day Will Come, a 1944 play by Leo Birinski
- The Day Will Come, a 2007 novel by Judy Clemens

== Music ==
- The Day Will Come (album) or the title song, by Howard Riley, 1970
- "The Day Will Come", a song by Mary Wells from The One Who Really Loves You, 1962
- "The Day Will Come", a song by Psy from Chiljip Psy-da, 2015
- "The Day Will Come", a song by Rod Stewart, 1965

== See also ==
- A Day Will Come (1934 film), a German French-language film
- A Day Will Come (1950 film), a West German film
- The Day Shall Come, a 2019 American comedy film
