= Trevor Watts =

English saxophonist

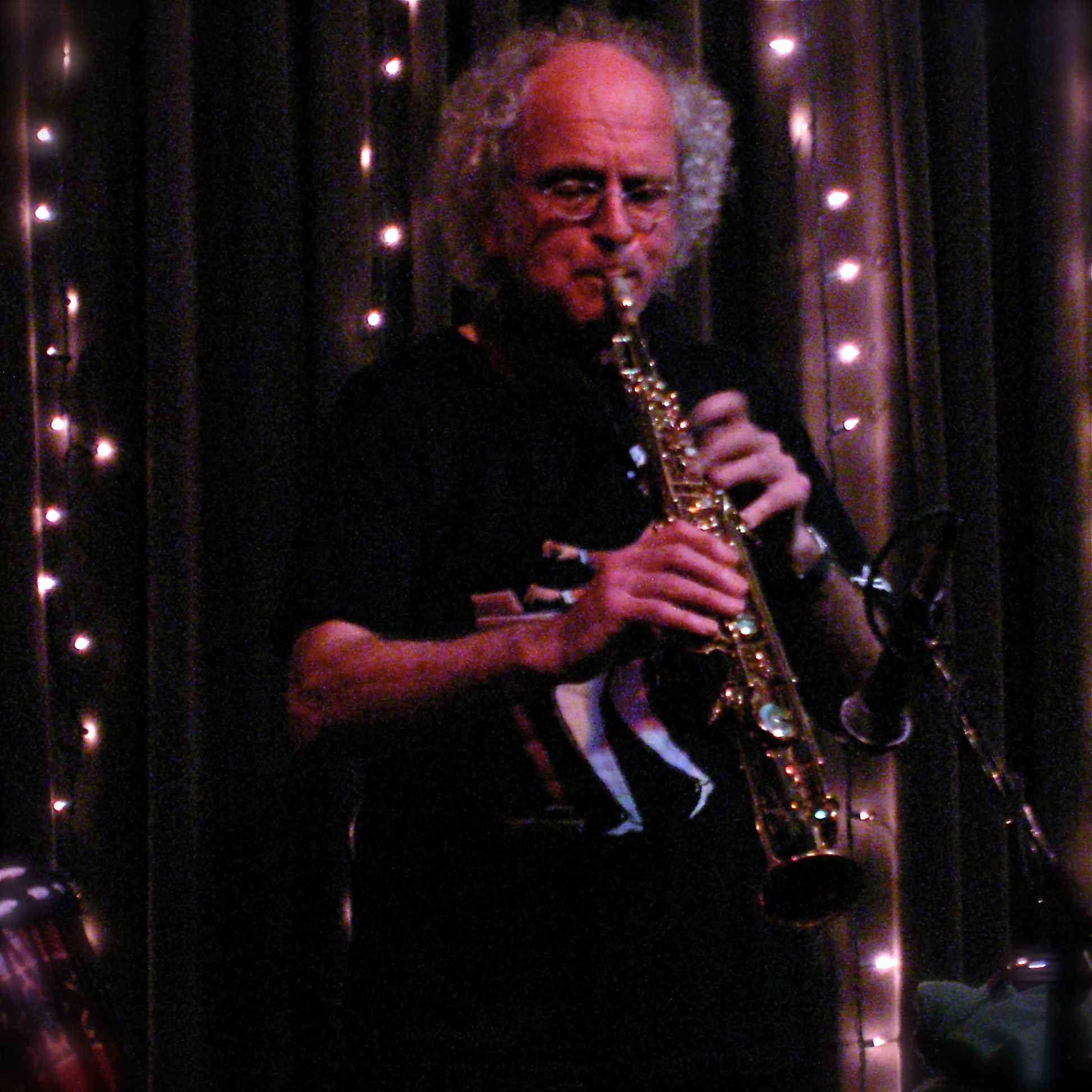
- Trevor Watts on soprano at Eddie's Attic, Decatur GA, photo by Shawn Vinson

Background information
- Born: Trevor Charles Watts; 26 February 1939 (age 86)
- Origin: York, England
- Genres: Jazz
- Occupation: Saxophonist
- Instrument(s): Alto saxophone, Soprano saxophone

Trevor Charles Watts (born 26 February 1939) is an English jazz and free-improvising alto and soprano saxophonist.

== Biography ==
Watts was born in York, England. He is largely self-taught, having taken up the cornet at age 12 then switched to saxophone at 18. While stationed in Germany with the RAF (1958–63), he encountered the drummer John Stevens and trombonist Paul Rutherford. After being demobbed he returned to London. In 1965, he and Stevens formed the Spontaneous Music Ensemble, which became one of the crucibles of British free improvisation. Watts left the band to form his own group Amalgam in 1967, then returned to SME for another stretch that lasted until the mid-1970s. Another key association was with the bassist Barry Guy and his London Jazz Composers' Orchestra, an association that lasted from the band's inception in the 1970s up to its disbandment in the mid-1990s.

Though he was initially strongly identified with the avant-garde, Watts is a versatile musician who has worked in everything from straight jazz contexts to rock and blues. His own projects have come increasingly to focus on blending jazz and African music, notably the Moiré Music ensemble which he has led since 1982 in configurations ranging from large ensembles featuring multiple drummers to more intimate trios. He has only occasionally recorded in freer modes in recent years, notably the CD 6 Dialogues, a duet album with Veryan Weston (the pianist in earlier editions of Moiré Music). A solo album, World Sonic, appeared on Hi4Head Records in 2005.

Watts has toured the world over numerous times, run workshops, received grants and commissions, and he has collaborated with jazz musicians including Archie Shepp, Steve Lacy, Don Cherry, Jayne Cortez and Stephen Grew. As of 2011, he continues to travel and has been touring Europe and North America with Veryan Weston and more recently, with the addition of percussionist/singer Jamie Harris as Eternal Triangle.

== Selected discography ==
- 1969: Amalgam: Prayer for Peace: Transatlantic Records
- 1971: Spontaneous Music Ensemble: So, What Do You Think?: Tangent
- 1971: Spontaneous Music Ensemble: 1.2. Albert Ayler: Affinity
- 1974: Amalgam: Innovation: Tangent
- 1976: Amalgam: Another Time: Vinyl
- 1977: With John Stevens: No Fear: Spotlite
- 1977: Amalgam: Deep: Vinyl
- 1977: Amalgam: "Samanna" Vinyl
- 1978: Cynosure: Ogun
- 1979: Amalgam: Over the Rainbow; ARC
- 1981: With Katrina Krimsky: Stella Malu: ECM
- 1985: Moiré Music: Trevor Watts' Moiré Music; ARC
- 1987: Moiré Music Sextet: Saalfelden Encore; Cadillac
- 1988: Moiré Music: With One Voice: FMR
- 1990: Moiré Music Drum Orchestra: Live In Latin America Vol.1: ARC
- 1991: Trevor Watts Moiré Music Group: Live in Latin America, Vol. 1 ARC
- 1994: Trevor Watts Moiré Music Group: A Wider Embrace: ECM
- 1995: Trevor Watts Moiré Music Group: Moiré Music Trio: Intakt Records
- 2000: Trevor Watts Moiré Music Group: Live at the Athens Concert Hall: ARC
- 2001: Trevor Watts and The Celebration Band : ARC
- 2002: Trevor Watts & Veryan Weston: 6 Dialogues: Emanem
- 2004: Amalgam: Semanna: FMR
- 2005: Trevor Watts: Rest of the Spotlight Sessions: Hi4Head (UK)
- 2005: Trevor Watts: World Sonic: Hi5Head (UK)
- 2006: Trevor Watts & Jamie Harris: Live in Sao Paulo, Brasil: Hi4Head
- 2007: Trevor Watts & Jamie Harris: Ancestry: Entropy Stereo
- 2008: The Original Trevor Watts Drum Orchestra: Drum Energy!: High Note
- 2008: Trevor Watts & Peter Knight: Reunion Live in London: Hi4Head (UK)

With Barry Guy/The London Jazz Composers' Orchestra

- Ode (Incus, 1972)
- Zurich Concerts (Intakt, 1988) with Anthony Braxton
- Harmos (Intakt, 1989)
- Double Trouble (Intakt, 1990)
- Theoria (Intakt, 1991) with Irène Schweizer
- Double Trouble Two (Intakt, 1998) with Irène Schweizer, Marilyn Crispell, and Pierre Favre
- Radio Rondo/Schaffhausen Concert (Intakt, 2009) with Irène Schweizer

With Harry Miller

- Different Times, Different Places Volume 2 (Ogun, 2016) recorded during 1977–1982

With Paul Rutherford and Iskra 1912

- Sequences 72 & 73 (Emanem, 1997)

With the Spontaneous Music Ensemble

- Quintessence (Emanem, 1974 [1986])
