= Double Trouble Two =

1998 studio album by Barry Guy

Studio album by Barry Guy London Jazz Composers Orchestra with Irène Schweizer, Marilyn Crispell, and Pierre Favre
- Released: 1 January 1998
- Recorded: 19 December 1995
- Studio: Rote Fabrik, Zürich, Switzerland
- Genre: Free jazz
- Length: 47:24
- Label: Intakt; CD 158
- Producer: Intakt Records

Barry Guy London Jazz Composers Orchestra chronology
Three Pieces for Orchestra (1997)	Double Trouble Two (1998)	Radio Rondo/Schaffhausen Concert (2009)

Double Trouble Two is an album by Barry Guy London Jazz Composers Orchestra with guest artists Irène Schweizer (piano), Marilyn Crispell (piano), and Pierre Favre (drums). Documenting a large-scale, 47-minute composition by Guy, it was recorded in December 1995 in Zürich, Switzerland, and was released on 1 January 1998 through Intakt Records.

The title refers to the fact that the work was originally conceived as a double concerto for pianists Howard Riley and Alexander von Schlippenbach, joined by the combined forces of the London Jazz Composers Orchestra and the Globe Unity Orchestra. An earlier recording of the work, Double Trouble, was issued by Intakt in 1990.

== Reception ==
Professional ratings
Review scores
Source	Rating
AllMusic	4/5 stars
The Penguin Guide to Jazz	4/4 stars
All About Jazz	4.5/5 stars

In a review for AllMusic, Steve Loewy wrote that the album "is filled with remarkable moments, particularly the performances by pianists Irene Schweizer and Marilyn Crispell... The ensemble work borders on the spectacular, too... devotees of the group will want this in their collection."

The authors of The Penguin Guide to Jazz Recordings awarded the album a full 4 stars, and stated: "Crispell and Schweizer have collaborated in a number of contexts. This must be one of the most powerful. It is a culminating moment for the LJCO."

Glenn Astarita of All About Jazz commented: "Music of this ilk provides a workout for one's imagination as the interpretations are bound to be diverse or perhaps subjected to ongoing debates or food for thought. That's where the magic lies. Double Trouble Two is an unfolding drama which gives purpose and reason to this thing we call 'free' or avant-garde jazz."

== Track listing ==
1. "Double Trouble Two" (Barry Guy) – 47:24

== Personnel ==
- Barry Guy – bass, conductor
- Evan Parker – reeds
- Trevor Watts – reeds
- Paul Dunmall – reeds
- Peter McPhail – reeds
- Simon Picard – reeds
- Henry Lowther – trumpet
- Jon Corbett – trumpet
- Marc Charig – cornet
- Paul Rutherford – trombone
- Alan Tomlinson – trombone
- Chris Bridges – trombone
- Robin Hayward – tuba
- Philipp Wachsmann – violin
- Irène Schweizer – piano
- Marilyn Crispell – piano
- Barre Phillips – bass
- Paul Lytton – drums
- Pierre Favre – drums
