= Raoul Palmer =

Raoul Albert Charles Palmer FRCOG (29 August 1904, Paris – 5 July 1985), known as A.C. Palmer, was a French gynecologist and pioneer in gynecologic laparoscopy.

Palmer was born in Paris. His parents, Fritjof Palmer and Signe, née Garling, were from Gothenburg, Sweden. Palmer was trained as a gynecologist and became the head of the gynecological research at the Faculty of Medicine in Paris in 1934. His experiments with intra-abdominal endoscopy started during World War II in Paris, and in his work he was supported by his wife Elisabeth. Using initially a cystoscope he observed the female genital organs via the transabdominal and transvaginal approach and realized that the former required a controlled pneumoperitoneum during the procedure. He developed instruments for his procedures and established safe criteria for insufflation using CO_{2} in lieu of oxygen via the Veress needle. Use of the Trendelenburg position and mobilizing the uterus by a transvaginal cannula were introduced by Palmer. In his first report he described his experience with 250 “coelioscopies gynecologiques” using both the transabdominal and the transvaginal approach. Palmer noted the advantages of the transabdominal approach. In 1949, he described the regular rhythmic contractions of uterus felt as early as 6–8 weeks, now known as the "Palmer's Sign". Procedures were performed at Hospital Broca first under local anesthesia; in 1952 Palmer switched to general anesthesia. New illumination techniques using quartz rods became available in 1952 greatly improving the laparoscopic image. In 1961 Palmer was the first to retrieve a human oocyte from a patient via laparoscopy. In 1962 Palmer performed laparoscopic tubal coagulations and other interventions.

Palmer and his wife traveled extensively teaching and influencing many gynecologists throughout the world about the use and potential of laparoscopy. Others came to visit them at their hospital in Paris. Laparoscopic pioneers influenced by Palmer include Melvin Cohen, Hans Frangenheim, Richard Fikentscher, Kurt Semm, and Patrick Steptoe.

== Honors and awards ==
- Honorary member, Royal Society of Medicine (1958)
- Fellow, Royal College of Obstetricians and Gynaecologists (1974)
- President, Société Française de Gynécologie (1962)
