= Veress needle =

Surgical instrument

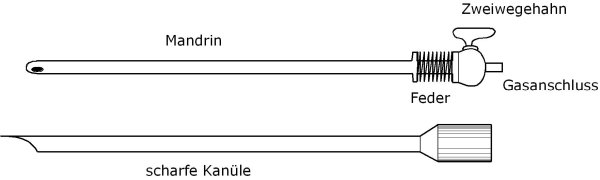
Veress needle

A Veress needle or Veres needle /VER-resh/ is a spring-loaded needle used to create pneumoperitoneum for laparoscopic surgery. Of the three general approaches to laparoscopic access, the Veress needle technique is the oldest and most traditional.

== History ==
The tool was first developed in 1932 by János Veres(s) (1903–1979), a Hungarian internist working with tuberculosis patients. At the time, one of the mainstays of treatment was to collapse an infected lung and allow lesions to heal. The needle was introduced as a safer technique to give patients such pneumothoraces. It was not until 1938, when he published his invention in the German literature, that the needle became more broadly known outside of Hungary.

Raoul Palmer introduced the use of the Veress needle in laparoscopy to establish a pneumoperitoneum .

== Description ==
Modern needles are 12 to 15 cm long, with an external diameter of 2 mm. The outer cannula consists of a beveled needle point for cutting through tissues of the abdominal wall. A spring-loaded, inner stylet is positioned within the outer cannula. This inner stylet has a dull tip to protect any viscera from injury by the sharp, outer cannula. Direct pressure on the tip—as when penetrating through tissue—pushes the dull stylet into the shaft of the outer cannula. When the tip of the needle enters a space such as the peritoneal cavity, the dull, inner stylet springs forward. Carbon dioxide is then passed through the Veress needle to inflate the space, creating a pneumoperitoneum.

== Use ==
In a large survey of 155,987 gynecologic procedures and 17,216 general surgery procedures, the Veress needle technique was used in 78% of them. Gynecologists (81%) used the tool more often than general surgeons (48%) who are far more likely to use the open access technique.

== Iatrogenics ==
Several studies have pointed out that for various laparoscopic surgical applications (such as cholecystectomy, groin hernia repairs and appendectomies), creating pneumoperitoneum by using a Veress needle is not always as safe and effective as other techniques (e.g. direct trocar insertion (DTI)). However, some other prospective studies point out that there is no significant difference between the technique chosen and incidence of complications by inducing pneumoperitoneum using a Veress needle or the Hasson technique. Between the complications associated to this instrument it can be found:

- Injury to hollow viscous
- Bleeding
- Failure to achieve pneumoperitoneum
- Prepneumoperitoneum (ie, preperitoneal insufflation)
- Biloma due to liver puncture.
- Vascular injury

== See also ==
- Laparoscopic surgery
- Trocar
