= The Day Will Come (album) =

Studio album by Howard Riley
- Released: 1970
- Recorded: March 1 & April 17, 1970; London
- Genre: Jazz
- Length: 61:36
- Label: CBS
- Producer: David Howells, Howard Riley

Howard Riley chronology
Angle (1969)	The Day Will Come (1970)	Flight (1971)

The Day Will Come is an album by English jazz pianist Howard Riley, which was recorded and released on CBS in 1970, and reissued on CD by Columbia in 1999. It features his working trio of that period, with bassist Barry Guy and drummer Alan Jackson.

== Reception ==
Professional ratings
Review scores
Source	Rating
The Penguin Guide to Jazz	👑

The Penguin Guide to Jazz awarded the record one of its rare crown accolades and notes that "the introduction of Barry Guy as co-composer is the key factor in our very high rating for this record. It is he who balances the rather tender and melancholic cast of Riley's playing."

In a review for Record Collector, Ian McCann stated that, in relation to Angle, recorded the previous year, The Day Will Come "boasts one of the great baffling sleeves of its era, but has more musical clarity: witness the pensive 'Sad Was the Song' and 'Winter'. There's less urgency here – perhaps time has given the threesome the understanding to not have to try so hard – and it's by far the better album."

== Track listing ==
All compositions by Howard Riley except as indicated

1. "Sphere" – 5:10
2. "Sad Was the Song" (Barry Guy) – 4:20
3. "Winter" – 4:15
4. "Dawn Vision" (Barry Guy) – 5:39
5. "Funeral Song" – 8:27
6. "Playtime" (Barry Guy) – 6:00
7. "Eclipse" – 6:05
8. "Deeper" – 5:10
9. "Games" (Barry Guy) – 5:00
10. "Score" – 1:54
11. "High" (Barry Guy) – 5:40
12. "The Day Will Come" (Barry Guy) – 3:47

== Personnel ==
- Howard Riley – piano
- Barry Guy – bass
- Alan Jackson – drums
