= Live at the Royal Festival Hall (Jaki Byard and Howard Riley album) =

Live album by Jaki Byard, Howard Riley
- Released: 1987
- Recorded: August 29, 1984
- Venue: Royal Festival Hall, London, UK
- Genre: Jazz
- Label: Leo
- Producer: Leo Feigin

Professional ratings
Review scores
Source	Rating
AllMusic	3/5 stars
The Penguin Guide to Jazz	3.5/4 stars

Live at the Royal Festival Hall is an album by pianists Jaki Byard and Howard Riley.

== Background ==
American pianist Jaki Byard first met British pianist Howard Riley at a jazz club in New York. Riley recommended Byard for an Arts Council tour in the UK; the concert that gave rise to this album was part of that tour.

== Recording and music ==
The album was recorded in concert at the Royal Festival Hall in London on August 29, 1984. Riley commented that the pair utilised compositions and their harmonies, so the performances were not freely improvised. The first track is played by Riley solo; the following two are played by Byard alone. The final two tracks are compositions by Thelonious Monk and are duets. The album was produced by Leo Feigin and released on LP by Leo Records.

== Track listing ==
1. "T.S.M. (With Thanks)" / "Imprint" / "Circle Cycle" (Howard Riley) – 15:41
2. "Peggy's Blue Skylight" (Charles Mingus) – 4:10
3. "European Episode" (Jaki Byard) – 5:20
4. "Round Midnight (Thelonious Monk)
5. "Straight, No Chaser (Monk)

== Personnel ==
- Jaki Byard – piano
- Howard Riley – piano
