= Odyssey (Barry Guy, Marilyn Crispell, and Paul Lytton album) =

Studio album by Barry Guy, Marilyn Crispell, and Paul Lytton
- Released: 2001
- Recorded: August 24 and 25, 1999
- Studio: Rote Fabrik, Zurich, Switzerland
- Genre: Free jazz
- Label: Intakt Records; CD 070

Odyssey is an album by bassist Barry Guy, pianist Marilyn Crispell, and drummer Paul Lytton. It was recorded on August 24 and 25, 1999, at Rote Fabrik in Zurich, Switzerland, and was released in 2001 by Intakt Records.

== Reception ==
Professional ratings
Review scores
Source	Rating
AllMusic	4/5 stars
The Penguin Guide to Jazz	4/4 stars

In a review for AllMusic, Brian Olewnick wrote: "Guy is an astonishing bassist and here ranges from prickly clusters to deep, resonant plumbings... Crispell... offers incisive and sympathetic playing... Lytton gets to foray into his wonderful world of clatter once in a while, but is also generally restrained here. The four short group improvisations work very well, but something really special is achieved when the free playing merges with Guy's emotional, even romantic themes as on the concluding 'Harmos.' When the gorgeous, heart-rending theme blossoms through the abstract introduction, the effect is stunningly beautiful. Highly recommended."

The authors of the Penguin Guide to Jazz Recordings awarded the album 4 stars, and stated: "The level of interaction is very high and there is constant empathy between the players."

Writing for One Final Note, Alan Jones commented: "The fact that Guy—arguably one of the principal visionaries of today's creative music—is more prone to composing with his co-performers' capabilities in mind, rather than showcasing his own, is quite revealing... the projects Guy involves himself in seem concerned with the sound picture as a whole, whether coming from a single soloist or an entire orchestra. A decipherable measure of humility must play a role... Marilyn Crispell has become an essential cog in the machinery of Barry Guy's music. This unit should be ceremoniously added to Guy's small, worthy spectrum of performing trios. The history of the piano trio is amalgamated in their embrace, while, rather than mature, Guy, Crispell and Lytton continue to evolve."

== Track listing ==
1. "Double Trouble Too" (Guy) – 8:05
2. "Odyssey" (Guy) – 11:46
3. "Heavy Metal" (Guy/Crispell/Lytton) – 4:33
4. "Spike" (Guy/Crispell/Lytton) – 3:32
5. "Rags" (Guy) – 10:21
6. "Luna" (Guy/Crispell/Lytton) – 4:08
7. "Celestial" (Guy) – 11:32
8. "Blade" (Guy/Crispell/Lytton) – 2:41
9. "Harmos" (Guy) – 6:47

== Personnel ==
- Marilyn Crispell – piano
- Barry Guy – bass
- Paul Lytton – percussion
