= The Moment's Energy =

Live album by Evan Parker Electro-Acoustic Ensemble
- Released: 2009
- Recorded: November 2007
- Venue: Lawrence Batley Theatre; Huddersfield, England
- Genre: Jazz
- Length: 66:55
- Label: ECM; ECM 2066
- Producer: Steve Lake

Evan Parker chronology
Time Lapse (2006)	The Moment's Energy (2009)	Whitstable Solo (2008)

Evan Parker Electro-Acoustic Ensemble chronology
The Eleventh Hour (2005)	The Moment's Energy (2009)	Hasselt (2012)

The Moment's Energy is a live album by the Evan Parker Electro-Acoustic Ensemble recorded at the Lawrence Batley Theatre in November 2007 and released on ECM in 2009.

== Reception ==
Professional ratings
Review scores
Source	Rating
Allmusic	4/5 stars
All About Jazz	4/5 stars
The Guardian	3/5 stars
DownBeat	4/5 stars

The AllMusic review by Thom Jurek awarded the album 4 stars stating "this work is more modern composition than merely free or experimental jazz. This is a gorgeous work when taken as a whole, a musical journey through multi-dimensional landscapes and sonic shadows that seems to stretch time itself."

On All About Jazz John Kelman called it "an album where there's both greater density and delineation, an even broader dynamic scope and, quite simply, one of the most ambitious mixtures of form and freedom, and extant and new-found textures" and "A composition that could never be performed the same way twice, its careful construction of sound in real-time and post-production makes for an ambitiously considered experience of great power and unsettling subtlety."

The Guardian's John Fordam observed "Different combinations of players come to the fore in each piece, which imparts variety to these abstract soundscapes."

The Penguin Jazz Guide called it "a composed piece for improvising ensemble that delivered a work of unparalleled sophistication and presence" noting "the sound-world of the piece is determined to a broad extent by the individual performers, but it is Parker's imagination - capricious responsive but in no way totalizing - that makes the piece so successful ... Though some may cite the ensemble's transatlantic collaboration with Roscoe Mitchell as a greater achievement, this remarkable collaborative work is its masterpiece."

Writing for DownBeat, John Ephland stated: "The earnest, sincere and able execution of this material by seasoned and well-trained artists suggest 'a new chamber orchestra'... There is cohesion and a kind of forward movement here. And their edginess spills over into a kind of frolicking playfulness light years from the energy of so-called free-jazz."

== Track listing ==
All compositions by Evan Parker

1. "The Moment's Energy I" - 9:29
2. "The Moment's Energy II" - 9:45
3. "The Moment's Energy III" - 9:34
4. "The Moment's Energy IV" - 4:19
5. "The Moment's Energy V" - 9:23
6. "The Moment's Energy VI" - 8:11
7. "The Moment's Energy VII" - 11:14
8. "Incandescent Clouds" - 5:05

== Personnel ==
- Evan Parker - soprano saxophone
- Peter Evans - trumpet, piccolo trumpet
- Ko Ishikawa - shō
- Ned Rothenberg - clarinet, bass clarinet, shakuhachi
- Philipp Wachsmann - violin, live electronics
- Agustí Fernandez - piano, prepared piano
- Barry Guy - double bass
- Paul Lytton - percussion, live electronics
- Lawrence Casserley - signal processing instrument
- Joel Ryan - sample and signal processing
- Walter Prati - computer processing
- Richard Barrett - live electronics
- Paul Obermayer - live electronics
- Marco Vecchi - sound projection
