= Hans Frangenheim =

German gynaecologist

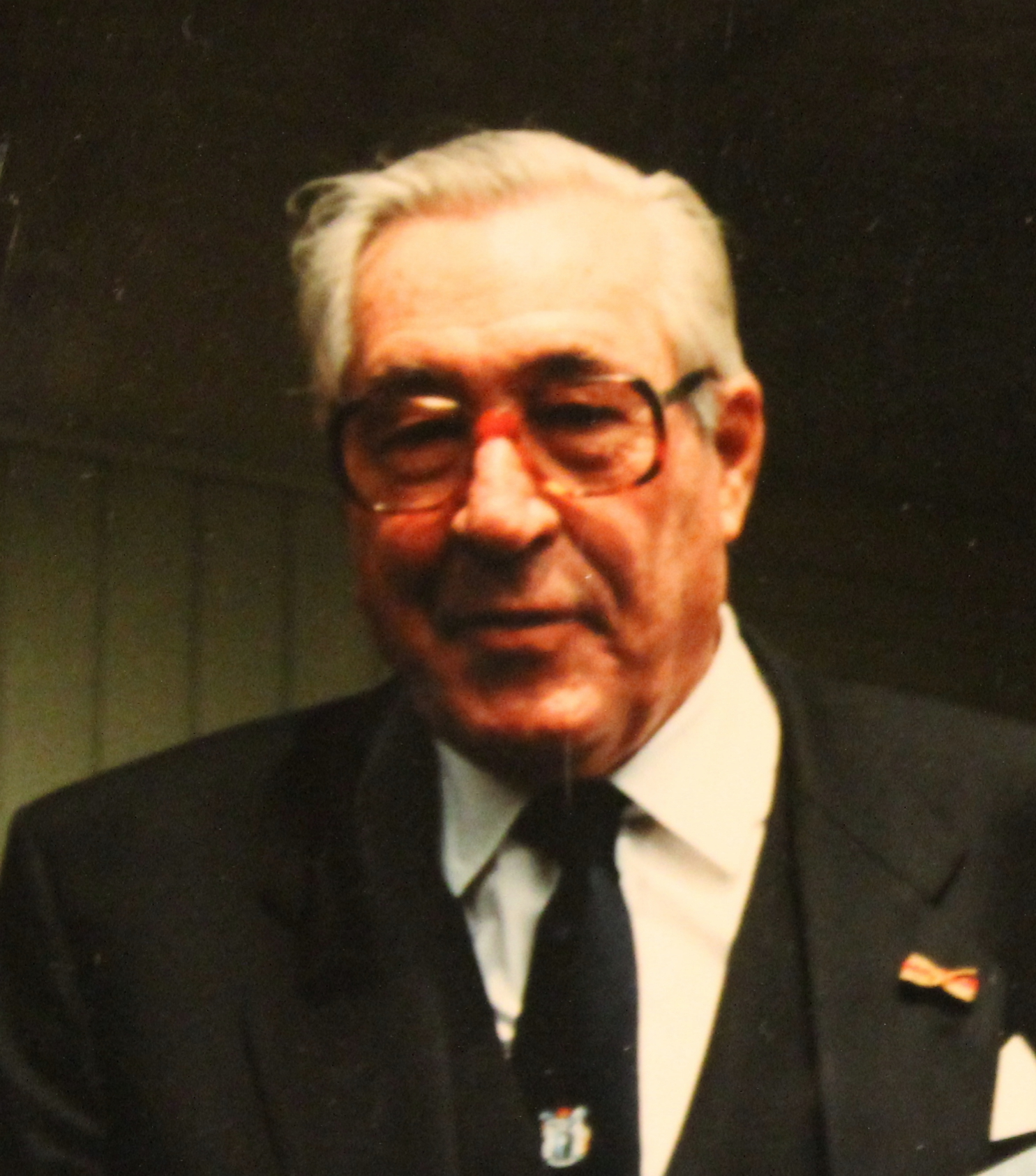
- Born: 18 January 1920; Cologne, Germany
- Died: 22 September 2001 (aged 81); Konstanz, Germany
- Education: University of Cologne (M.D.)
- Occupation: Gynecologist

Hans Frangenheim (18 January 1920, Cologne, Germany – 22 September 2001, Konstanz, Germany) was a German gynaecologist and a pioneer in gynecologic laparoscopy.

== Biography ==
Hans Frangenheim was the second son of Margarethe (née Steinmetz) and Paul Frangenheim, Director of Surgery at the University of Cologne. When his father died in 1930, Frangenheim was sent to a boarding school in Switzerland until 1938. Early in World War II Frangenheim did military service with the Luftwaffe. In 1942 he started his medical studies at the Universities of Münster, Bonn, and Cologne. After the war he assisted in an American military hospital. From 1946 to 1950 Frangenheim worked in Surgery at the University of Cologne and at the Pathology Institute of the University of Bonn. In 1950 he started his training in gynecology at the Women's Clinic at Wuppertal under the directorship of Karl Julius Anselmino and advanced to become Oberarzt in 1954. In 1966 he became Director of Gynecology at the City Hospital of Konstanz and in 1983 he was named Professor at the Freiburg University. He retired in 1985 and died in 2001.

== Pioneer in laparoscopy ==
In 1951, Frangenheim observed an internist performing a liver laparoscopy using a method developed by Heinz Kalk. Frangenheim later recalled” I realized that this could mean a new aid for gynecology and began looking into the literature.” Frangenheim improved instrumentation and started to perform laparoscopic procedure on a regular basis by 1952. In 1955 Frangenheim visited Raoul Palmer in Paris another pioneer in laparoscopy applying it for the investigation of infertility. In 1958 Frangenheim reported his experience when few gynecologist were using the abdominal approach to investigate the pelvis. More popular was at that time the approach pioneered by Albert Decker using culdoscopy. Frangenheim developed an improved insufflator to facilitate the installation of CO_{2} into the abdomen. He started to teach numerous interested colleagues at the Wuppertal hospital, among them Patrick Steptoe who would later use laparoscopy to harvest oocytes for the first IVF pregnancies. Frangenheim published the first book about gynecologic laparoscopy in 1959. He pointed out that it was superior to culdoscopy and useful for investigations of infertility and ectopic pregnancy. In 1964 Frangenheim presented the use of “cold light” whereby the light was transmitted through fiberoptics to the laparoscope. Illumination was much better and Frangenheim predicted that this would replace traditional illumination that had the light bulb incorporated at the tip of the instrument. Frangenheim not only used laparoscopy for diagnostic indications but also started to do operative interventions. Along with Palmer Frangenheim introduced a laparoscopic method to block the fallopian tubes for sterilization.

== Selected publications ==
- Frangenheim H: Die Laparoskopie und die Culdoskopie in der Gynäkologie. Thieme Verlag, Stuttgart, 1959
- Frangenheim H (1964). "Tubal Sterilization Under Visualization with the Laparoscope". Geburtshilfe Frauenheilkd. 24: 470–3. PMID 14237965.
- Frangenheim H (1969). "[The present position of laparoscopy in gynecology]". Arch Gynakol. 207 (1): 240–50. doi:10.1007/BF00683066. PMID 5819942. S2CID 31554297.
- Frangenheim H: Die Laparoskopie in der Gynäkologie, Chirurgie und Pädiatrie: Lehrbuch und Atlas. Thieme Verlag, Stuttgart, 1970, ISBN 3-13-331403-3
- Frangenheim H: Laparoscopy and Culdoscopy in Gynecology: Textbook and atlas. Butterworths, London, 1972, ISBN 0-407-90100-0
- Frangenheim H: Diagnostische und operative Laparoskopie in der Gynäkologie: ein Farbatlas. Marseille Verlag, München, 1980
- Frangenheim H: Laparoskopie in der Gynäkologie: Bilder zur diagnostischen und operativen Laparoskopie. ROCOM Verlag, Basel, 1981, ISBN 3-7244-8520-4

== Honors and awards ==
- Honorary member, American Association of Gynecologic Laparoscopists (1971)
- Fellow of the Royal College of Obstetricians and Gynaecologists ad eundem (1978)
- Honorary member, Arbeitsgemeinschaft Gynäkologische Endoskopie der Deutschen Gesellschaft für Gynäkologie und Geburtshilfe
- President, French Societe Medicale Internationale d Endoscopie et de Radiocinema
- Shirokdar Memorial Award (1979)
- Bundesverdienstkreuz I. Klasse (1982)
- Croce al merito (Italien) (1982)
