= Zurich Concerts =

1988 live jazz album by Barry Guy

Live album by Barry Guy and the London Jazz Composers' Orchestra with Anthony Braxton
- Released: 1988
- Recorded: November 11, 1987; March 27, 1988
- Venue: The Taktlos Festival, Rote Fabrik, Zürich
- Genre: Free jazz
- Length: 1:34:17
- Label: Intakt; CD 005
- Producer: Intakt Records

Barry Guy and the London Jazz Composers' Orchestra chronology
| Stringer (1984) | Zurich Concerts (1988) | Harmos (1989) |

Zurich Concerts is a double live album by Barry Guy and the London Jazz Composers' Orchestra featuring recordings of two large-scale compositions, one by Guy, the other by guest artist Anthony Braxton. The Guy work was recorded on November 11, 1987, at Rote Fabrik in Zürich, while the Braxton work was recorded on March 27, 1988, at the same location. The album was initially released on LP in 1988 by Intakt Records, and was reissued on CD in 1995.

== Reception ==
Professional ratings
Review scores
| Source | Rating |
|---|---|
| AllMusic | 4/5 stars |
| The Penguin Guide to Jazz | 3.5/4 stars |

In a review for AllMusic, Thom Jurek wrote: "the attendees at these Zurich concerts were treated to the most intimate and prophetic of expressions in these two evenings. They were also given evidence of the very ground on which free improvisation and new composition stand linked to one another."

The authors of The Penguin Guide to Jazz Recordings noted that "this is one of the few occasions when [Braxton's] contact with British and European improvisors has seemed to yield a genuinely communicative music," and stated that "whereas Guy likes to work with existing sub-groups of the orchestra, Braxton layers compositions... in dense palimpsests."

== CD track listing ==
Disc 1

1. "Polyhymnia " (Barry Guy) – 37:30

Disc 2

1. "Composition 135 (+41, 63, 96), 136 (+96), 108B (+86, 96), 134 (+96)" (Anthony Braxton) – 56:47

== Personnel ==
- Barry Guy – bass (disc 2), conductor (disc 1)
- Anthony Braxton – conductor (disc 2)
- Evan Parker – reeds
- Paul Dunmall – reeds
- Peter McPhail – reeds
- Simon Picard – reeds
- Trevor Watts – reeds
- Henry Lowther – trumpet
- Jon Corbett – trumpet
- Marc Charig – cornet
- Alan Tomlinson – trombone
- Paul Rutherford – trombone
- Radu Malfatti – trombone
- Steve Wick – tuba
- Philipp Wachsmann – violin
- Howard Riley – piano
- Barre Phillips – bass (disc 1)
- Dave Holland – bass (disc 2)
- Paul Lytton – drums
- Tony Oxley – drums (disc 2)
