= Riis =

Riis is a surname. Notable people with the surname include:

- Asbjørn 'Bear' Riis (born 1957), Danish professional wrestler
- Bendik Riis (1911–1988), Norwegian artist
- Bjarne Riis (born 1964), Danish former professional road bicycle racer turned team owner and manager
- Einar Riis (1922–2006), Norwegian aircraft broker and consul in Rome
- Fredrik Riis (1789–1845), Norwegian county governor
- Hilde Riis (born 1959), Norwegian cross-country skier
- Jacob Riis (1849–1914), Danish-American journalist, photographer, and social reformer
- Joachim Riis (born 1989), Danish politician
- Nelson Riis (born 1942), Canadian businessman and former politician
- Povl Riis (1925–2017), Danish gastroenterologist
- Sharon Riis (1947–2016), Canadian writer
