= Barry Guy =

British composer and double bass player (born 1947)

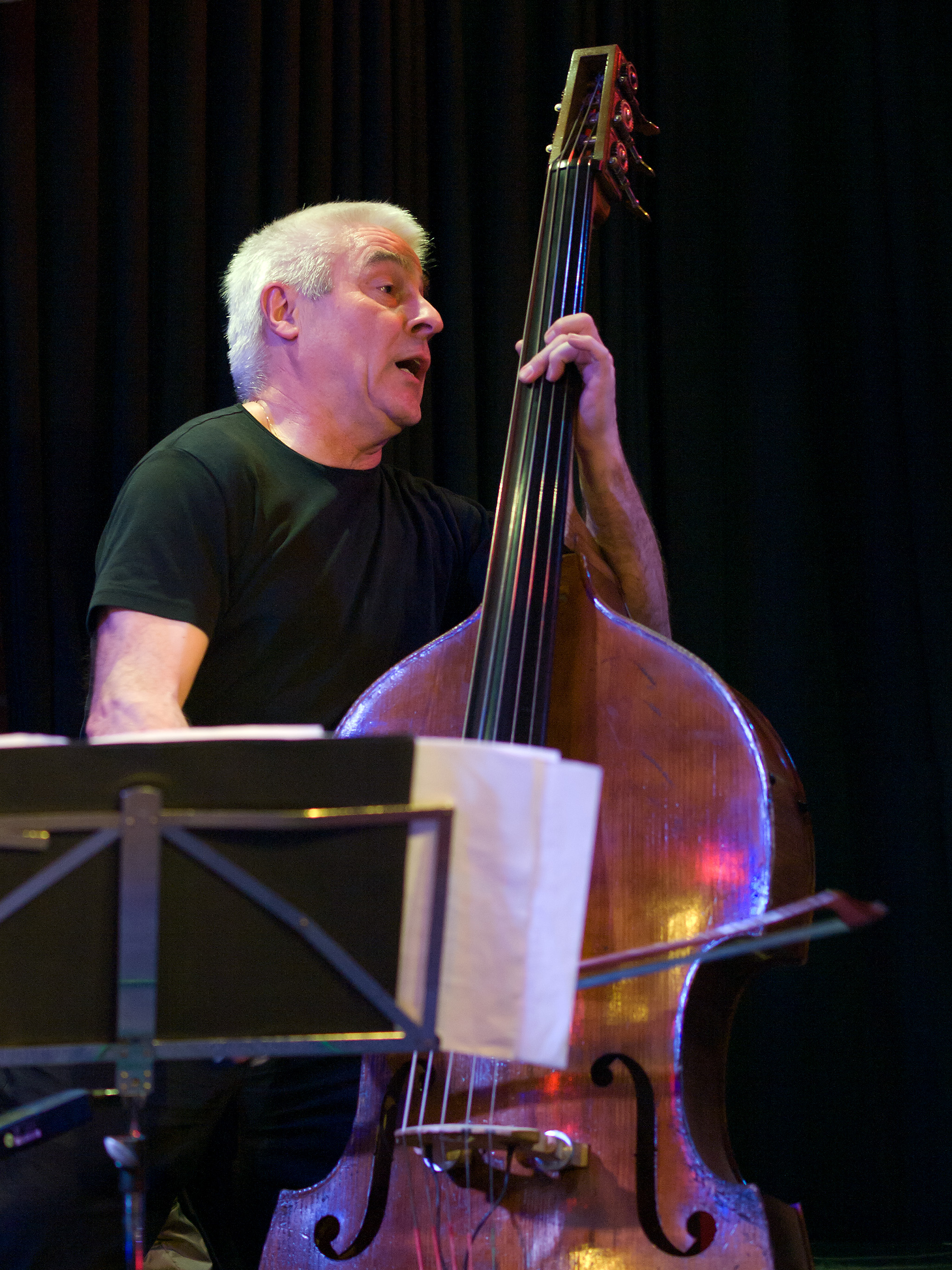
- Barry Guy (2011)

Background information
- Born: 22 April 1947 (age 79)
- Origin: London, England
- Genres: Free improvisation, free jazz, early music, classical music, contemporary classical
- Occupations: Musician, composer
- Instrument: Double bass
- Years active: 1969–present

Barry John Guy (born 22 April 1947, in London, England) is an English composer and double bass player. His range of interests encompasses early music, contemporary composition, jazz and improvisation, and he has worked with a wide variety of orchestras in the UK and Europe. He studied at the Guildhall School of Music under Buxton Orr, and later taught there.

Guy came to the fore as an improvising bassist as a member of a trio with pianist Howard Riley and drummer Tony Oxley (Witherden, 1969). He also became an occasional member of John Stevens' ensembles in the 1960s and 1970s, including the Spontaneous Music Ensemble. In the early 1970s, he was a member of the influential free improvisation group Iskra 1903 with Derek Bailey and trombonist Paul Rutherford (a project revived in the late 1970s, with violinist Philipp Wachsmann replacing Bailey). He also formed a long-standing partnership with saxophonist Evan Parker, which led to a trio with drummer Paul Lytton which became one of the best-known and most widely travelled free-improvising groups of the 1980s and 1990s. He was briefly a member of the Michael Nyman Band in the 1980s, performing on the soundtrack of The Draughtsman's Contract.

== Career ==
=== London Jazz Composers' Orchestra ===
Guy's interests in improvisation and formal composition received their grandest form in the London Jazz Composers' Orchestra. Originally formed to perform Guy's composition Ode in 1972 (released as a 2-LP set on Incus and later, in expanded form, as a 2-CD set on Intakt), it became one of the great large-scale European improvising ensembles. Early documentation is spotty – the only other recording from its early years is Stringer (FMP, now available on Intakt paired with the later "Study II") – but, beginning in the late 1980s, the Swiss label Intakt set out to document the band more thoroughly. The result was a series of ambitious, album-length compositions designed to give all the players in the band maximum opportunity for expression, while still preserving a rigorous sense of form: Zurich Concerts (with Anthony Braxton), Harmos, Double Trouble (originally written for an encounter with Alexander von Schlippenbach's Globe Unity Orchestra, though the eventual CD was just for the LJCO), Theoria (a concerto for guest pianist Irène Schweizer), Portraits (a 2-CD set of musical portraits of the band members and their internal groupings), Three Pieces, and Double Trouble Two. The group's activities subsided in the mid-1990s, but it was never formally disbanded, and reconvened in 2008 for a one-off concert in Switzerland. In the mid-1990s Guy also created a second, smaller ensemble, the Barry Guy New Orchestra.

=== Other activities ===
Guy has also written for other large improvising ensembles, such as the NOW Orchestra and ROVA (the piece Witch Gong Game inspired by images by the visual artist Alan Davie).

His current improvising activities include piano trios with Marilyn Crispell and Agusti Fernandez. He has also recorded several albums for ECM, which often focus on the interface between improvisers and electronics, including his work in Evan Parker's Electro-Acoustic Ensemble and his own Ceremony.

Guy's session work in the pop field includes playing double bass on the song "Nightporter", from the Japan album Gentlemen Take Polaroids.

He is married to the early music violinist Maya Homburger. After spending some years in Ireland, they now live in Switzerland. They run the small label Maya, which releases a variety of records in the genres of free improvisation, baroque music and contemporary composition.

In 2016, Guy was appointed Honorary Professor at the Rhythmic Music Conservatory (RMC) in Copenhagen, Denmark, where he periodically conducts workshops and master classes.

=== Style ===
Guy's jazz work is characterised by free improvisation, using a range of unusual playing methods: bowed and pizzicato sounds beneath the bass's bridge; plucking the strings above the left hand; beating the strings with percussion instrument mallets; and "preparing" the instrument with sticks and other implements inserted between the strings and fingerboard. His improvisations are often percussive and unpredictable, inhabiting no discernible harmonic territory and pushing into unknown regions. However, they can also be melodious and tender with due regard for harmonic integration with other players, and at times he will even play with a straight jazz swing feel.

Similarly, in his concert works, Guy manages to alternate harmonic and rhythmic complexity worthy of 1960s experimentalists such as Penderecki and Stockhausen with joyous, often ecstatic, melody. Works such as "Flagwalk" for string orchestra and "Fallingwater – Concerto for Orchestra" display Guy's compositional skill in handling extended forms and writing for large instrumental groups.

Some of his compositions, such as "Witch Gong Game" for ensemble, use graphic notation in conjunction with cue cards to lead performers into playing and improvising material from numbered sections of the score.

He is also an architect.

== Concert works ==
=== Orchestra ===
- Incontri (1970)
- Anna (1974)
- Flagwalk (1974)
- Songs from Tomorrow (1975)
- Voyages of the Moon (1983)
- The Eye of Silence (1988)
- UM 1788 (1989)
- After the Rain (1992)
- Concerto for Orchestra: "Fallingwater" (1996)

=== Large ensemble (seven or more players) ===
- Bitz! (1979)
- D (1972)
- Look Up! (1991)
- Play (1976)

=== Soloists and large ensemble (seven or more players) ===
- Statements II – Ex (1979)

=== Works for 2–6 Players ===
- Bubblets (1998)
- Buzz (1994)
- Eos X (1976)
- The Eye of Silence (1989)
- Four Miniatures (1969)
- Games (for All Ages) (1973)
- Mobile Herbarium (1992)
- Pfiff (1979)
- Redshift (1998)
- rondOH! (1985)
- String Quartet No.2 (1970)
- Un Coup de Dés (1994)
- Whistle and Flute (1985)

=== Solo works (excluding keyboard) ===
- Celebration (1994)
- Statements II (1972)

=== Solo voices and up to six players ===
- Remembered Earth (1992)
- The Road to Ruin (1986)
- String Quartet No.3 (1973)
- Waiata (1980)
- Eos (1978)
- Kingdom (1992)
- No Man's Land (1974)
- Video Life (1986)

=== Music for film or television ===
- Breaking the Surface (1986)

=== Electroacoustic works ===
- Hold Hands and Sing (1978)

These works are published by Chester Novello, UK, and further information may be found on their Barry Guy page.

== Recordings ==
=== Solo ===
- Statements V-XI for double bass and violone (1976), Incus 22 – Early solo playing
- Assist, Jazz & NOW 4 (1985) – Solos plus a long duo improvisation with Fred Van Hove
- Fizzles (1993), Maya MCD 9301 – Solo double bass and chamber bass
- Symmetries (2002), Maya MCD 0201 – Solo double bass
- Five Fizzles for Samuel Beckett (2014), NoBusiness NBEP 2 – Solo double bass
- Irvin's Comet (2020), NoBusiness NBLP 137 – Solo double bass

=== With John Stevens and Trevor Watts ===
- Withdrawal (1966–67), Emanem 4020 – as Spontaneous Music Ensemble
- Prayer for peace (1969), Transatlantic TRA 196/FMRCD96-V0402 – as Amalgam (Guy appears on one track only)
- No fear (1977), Spotlite SPJ 556/Hi 4 Head Records HFHCD001
- Mining the Seam (1977), Spotlite SPJ 556/Hi 4 Head Records HFHCD003
- Application, interaction, and... (1978), Spotlite SPJ 513/Hi 4 Head Records HFHCD002

=== With Howard Riley ===
- Discussions (1967), Opportunity CP2500
- Angle (1968-69), CBS Realm 52669/Sony–Columbia 494433 – with Howard Riley Trio
- The Day Will Come (1970), CBS 64077//Sony–Columbia 494434 1970 – with Howard Riley Trio
- Flight (1971), Turtle TUR301 – with Howard Riley trio; re-released on FMR in 1995
- Synopsis (1973), Incus 13 LP/Emanem 4044 CD – with Howard Riley trio
- Overground (1974-75), Emanem 4054 CD – with Howard Riley Trio
- Improvisations are forever now (1977) Vinyl VS 113 – with Riley & Wachsmann
- Improvisations are forever now (1977-79), Emanem 4070; re-issue of Vinyl LP with extra tracks from 1979 – with Riley & Wachsmann
- Endgame (1979), JAPO Records 60028 – with Riley, John Stevens and Trevor Watts
- Facets (1979), Impetus 38002 – with Riley and John Stevens
- Organic (1979), Jazzprint JPVP115 – with Riley and John Stevens

=== With Bob Downes Open Music ===
- Diversions (1969), Openian 001
- Hell's angels (1970), BDOM 003

=== With Tony Oxley ===
- Die jazz werkstatt (1970), NDR – on "Saturnalia" by Tony Oxley
- Ichnos (1971), RCA Victor SF 8215 – with Tony Oxley Group
- Tony Oxley (1972), Incus 8
- February Papers (1977), Incus 18
- Tomorrow is here (1985), Dossier ST 7507 – with the Tony Oxley Celebration Orchestra
- Unreleased 1974–2016 (2022), Discus 129CD - recorded in 1974, 1981, and 2016

=== With Iskra 1903 ===
- Buzz Soundtrack (1970-71), Emanem – with Paul Rutherford and Derek Bailey
- Iskra 1903 (1972), Incus – with Rutherford and Bailey
  Reissued as Chapter One 1970-1972 (Emanem, 2000) with additional material
- Goldsmiths (1972), Emanem – with Rutherford and Bailey
- Free improvisation (1973), Deutsche Grammophon 2740 105 – three-record set with one record devoted to Iskra 1903
- Chapter Two 1981-3 (1981-3), Emanem – with Rutherford and Phil Wachsmann
- South on the Northern (1988-9), Emanem – with Rutherford and Wachsmann
- Frankfurt 1991 (1991), Emanem – with Rutherford and Wachsmann
- Iskra Nckpa 1903 (1992), Maya Recordings 9502 – with Rutherford and Wachsmann

=== With Iskra 1912 ===
- Sequences 72 & 73 (1972-4), Emanem 4018

=== With Barre Phillips ===
- Jazz workshop 71 (1971), NDR TV – on "Whoop" and "La Palette" by Barre Phillips
- For all it is (1971) – with Phillips, J.F.Jenny-Clarke, Danielson and Martin (Four basses & percussion)
- Bass duets (1981), FMP CD 102 – Peter Kowald duos with Barre Phillips, Barry Guy, Maarten Altena
- Arcus (1989), Maya MCD 9101 – double bass duets with Barre Phillips

=== With London Jazz Composers' Orchestra ===
- Ode (1972), Incus
- That Time (2020), Not Two MW1001-2 (recorded 1972 and 1980)
- Study II/Stringer (1980–91), Intakt CD095
- Stringer (1984), SAJ–41
- Zurich Concerts (1987–88), Intakt 005 - with Anthony Braxton
- Harmos (1989), Intakt CD013
- Double Trouble (1990), Intakt CD019
- Theoria (1991), Intakt CD024 - with Irène Schweizer
- Portraits (1993), Intakt CD 035
- Three Pieces for Orchestra (1995), Intakt CD 045 - feat. Marilyn Crispell & Maggie Nicols
- Double Trouble Two (1998), Intakt CD 053
- Radio Rondo/Schaffhausen Concert (2009), Intakt CD 158

=== With the Barry Guy New Orchestra ===
- Inscape–Tableaux (2000), Intakt CD 066
- Oort–Entropy (2004), Intakt CD 101

=== With Evan Parker ===
- 4,4,4 (1980), View VS 0011/Konnex CD – with Parker, Paul Rutherford, and John Stevens
- Incision (1981), FMP SAJ-35 – Duo with Evan Parker
- Tracks (1983), Incus 42 – with Parker and Lytton
- Tai kyoku (1985), Jazz & NOW 3 – Duo with Parker
- To whom it may concern (1985), Allelopathy ALL-1 – Two quartets including Parker
- Hook, Drift and Shuffle (1985), Incus 45 LP/psi 07.07 CD – with Parker, George Lewis, and Paul Lytton
- Atlanta (1986), Impetus IMP 18617 – trio with Parker and Paul Lytton
- Supersession (1988), Matchless MR17 – with Parker, Keith Rowe, and Eddie Prévost
- Birmingham concert (1993), Rare Music RM026 – with Parker, Paul Dunmall, Tony Levin
- 50th Birthday Concert (1994), Leo Records CD LR 212/213
- Imaginary Values (1994), Maya MCD 9401 – with Parker and Lytton
- Bush Fire (1995), Ogun OGCD 009 – with Parker, Louis Moholo, Pule Pheto, Gibo Pheto
- Breaths and Heartbeats (1995), Rastascan BRD 019 – with Parker and Lytton
- The Redwood Session (1995), CIMP 101 – with Parker and Lytton
- Obliquities (1995), Maya 9501 – Duo with Parker
- Natives and Aliens (1996), Leo CD LR 243 – Evan Parker trio with Marilyn Crispell
- Toward the Margins (1996), ECM New series 1612 – The Evan Parker Electro-Acoustic Ensemble
- At the Vortex (1996), Emanem 4022 – with Parker and Lytton
- Dividuality (1997), Maya MCD0101 – with Parker and Lawrence Casserley
- At Les Instants Chavirés (1997), psi 02.06 – with Parker and Lytton
- Drawn Inward (1998), ECM 1693 – The Evan Parker Electro-Acoustic Ensemble
- After Appleby (1999), Leo CD LR 283/284 – Evan Parker trio with Marilyn Crispell
- 2X3=5 (1999), Leo CD LR 305 – with Parker and Lytton, plus the Schlippenbach Trio
- Memory/Vision (2002), ECM – The Evan Parker Electro-Acoustic Ensemble
- Birds and Blades (2003), Intakt 080 – Duo with Parker
- Boustrophedon (2004), ECM – Evan Parker and the Transatlantic Art Ensemble
- Free zone Appleby 2004 (2004), psi 05.05 – with Paul Lytton, Joel Ryan, Philipp Wachsmann
- Zafiro (2006), Maya Recordings MCD0602 – with Parker and Lytton
- The Moment's Energy (2007), ECM – The Evan Parker Electro-Acoustic Ensemble
- Topos (2007), Maya Recordings MCD 0701 – with Parker, Fernandez and Lytton
- Hasselt (2012), psi 12.03 – The Evan Parker Electro-Acoustic Ensemble
- Live at Maya Recordings Festival (NoBusiness, 2013)
- Music for David Mossman: Live at Vortex London (2018), Intakt – with Parker and Lytton

=== With Mats Gustafsson ===
- Mouth eating trees and related activities (1992), Okka Disk OD12010 – with Lovens
- You Forget to Answer (1994-95), Maya MCD 9601 – with Raymond Strid
- Gryffgryffgryffs (1996), Music & Arts CD-1003 – with Strid, Crispell
- Frogging (1997), Maya MCD 9702 – Duo with Gustafsson
- Hidros one (1997), Caprice 21566
- Tarfala (2008), Maya Recordings MCD0801 – with Strid

=== With Marilyn Crispell ===
- Cascades (1993), Music and Arts 853
- Odyssey (1999), Intakt CD 070 – with Paul Lytton
- Ithaca (2003), Intakt CD 096 – with Paul Lytton
- Phases of the Night (2008), Intakt CD 138 – with Paul Lytton
- Deep Memory (2016), Intakt CD 273 – with Paul Lytton

=== With Maya Homburger ===
- Ceremony (1997), ECM New series 1643
- Celebration (2001), Auditorium AUD 01203 – with Walter Prati
- J.S. Bach/Barry Guy (2002), Maya MCD 0301 – (Guy does not play on this CD)
- Dakryon (2004), Maya MCD 0501 – with Pierre Favre

=== With others ===
- Pisa 1980: Improvisors' Symposium (1980), Incus 37 (LP)/psi 04.03/4 (CD)
- Long on Dossier (1980), ST 7529 – Single track on Jon Rose LP
- Paintings (1981), FMP 0960 – Bass duos with Peter Kowald
- IRCAM, un portrait (1983), IRCAM 001/1983 – Barry Guy/Jane Manning, Soft Morning City (Machover)
- Re Touch (1983), View VS0025 – Allan Holdsworth/Jeff Young/Barry Guy/Ron Mathewson/John Stevens
- Machover, American Contemporary (1984), CRI SD 506 – Ensemble contemporain with Jane Manning & Barry Guy
- Play with light and shade (1990), SLAMCD 402 – Duo with Vanessa Mackness on compilation CD
- Nailed (1990), FMP CD 108 – Cecil Taylor: The Quartet
- Melancholy (1990), FMP CD 104 – Cecil Taylor Workshop Ensemble
- Elsie Jo live (1991), Maya MCD 9201 – with Irène Schweizer, Evan Parker, Konrad Bauer, Barre Phillips, and Paul Lytton
- Meetings (1992), Splasc(h) – Mario Schiano
- After the rain (1993), NMC DO13S – Composition by Guy; City of London Sinfonia, conductor Richard Hickox
- Vade Mecum (1993), Soul Note 121208 – With Bill Dixon
- Vade Mecum II (1993), Soul Note 121211 – With Bill Dixon
- 1994, Study – Witch Gong Game (1994), Maya MCD 9402 – Barry Guy and the NOW Orchestra
- Nickelsdorf Konfrontation (1995), Silkheart 143 – Joel Futterman-Kidd Jordan Quintet
- Sensology (1995), Maya MCD 9701 – Duo with Paul Plimley
- The Secret Magritte (1995), Black Saint 120177-2 – Larry Ochs with Lisle Ellis, Barry Guy, Chris Brown, Marilyn Crispell, William Winant, Rova Sax Quartet
- Social security (1996), Victo cd043 – Mario Schiano
- Extremely Quartet Hat (1996), ART CD 6199 – John Law
- Hilliard songbook: new music for voices (1997), ECM New Series 1614/15 – Hilliard Ensemble with Barry Guy bass
- Gudira (1998), Nuscope Recordings 1003 – with Robert Dick and Randy Raine-Reusch
- Bingo (1998), Victo CD056 – Rova Saxophone Quartet, composition: Witch Gong Game by Barry Guy (Guy does not play)
- Sit fast (1998), Virgin Classics 7243 – Fretwork, composition: Buzz by Barry Guy (Guy does not play)
- Lux aeterna (2000), ECM 1695 – Thomas and Patrick Demenga, cello; includes composition Redshift by BG (Guy does not play)
- Fayka (2001), Enja ENJ-9447 2 – Duos with Mahmoud Turkmani
- 2 of 2 (2001), SOFA 510 – Tri-Dim + Barry Guy (+ Jim O'Rourke)
- Total Music Meeting 2002 (2002), Audiology II, a/l/l 006 – Compilation CD of 11 groups live in Berlin
- Grain (2002?), DotDotDot Music 003 – One (very) short solo track on this compilation
- November Music 2003 (2003), November Music NM 007 – One track on compilation CD
- Gubbröra (2004), psi 04.10 – Sandell/Stackenas/Parker/Guy/Lytton
- Brainforest (2004), Intakt CD 107 – Jacques Demierre/Barry Guy/Lucas Niggli
- Composition/Improvisation Nos. 1, 2 & 3 (2004), ECM 1872/171 6989 – Roscoe Mitchell and the Transatlantic Art Ensemble
- Aurora (2004–06), Maya Recordings MCD0601 – Fernandez/Guy/Lopez
- Folio (2005), ECM New series 1931 – with Maya Homburger, Muriel Cantoreggi, and the Münchener Kammerorchester conducted by Christoph Poppen
- Open textures (2005), Forward.rec 006 – Carlos Bechegas/Barry Guy
- Falkirk (2005), FMRCD168-i0706 – Glasgow Improvisers Orchestra with Barry Guy
- Portrait (1972-2006), Intakt CD 123 – Compilation/Celebration of 25 years of Barry Guy's music
- Occasional Poems (2015), Not Two MW931-2 – Barry Guy / Ken Vandermark
- Grande Casino (2016), Euphorium 064 – EUPHORIUM_freakestra
- One For My Baby And One More For The Bass (2018), Euphorium 077 – Oliver Schwerdt/Barry Guy/Günter Sommer

== Bibliography ==
- Barry Witherden: "Conversation Pieces", in: Jazz Monthly, April 1969, pp. 8–10 (an article describing Guy's playing style as a member of the Howard Riley Trio of the late 1960s).
- Benjamin Dwyer: "An Interview with Barry Guy", in: B. Dwyer: Different Voices. Irish Music and Music in Ireland (Hofheim: Wolke Verlag, 2014), p. 133–142.
