= Karen Borca =

American jazz bassoonist (born 1948)

- Also known as: Karen Lyons
- Born: September 5, 1948 (age 78); Green Bay, Wisconsin
- Occupations: jazz and free jazz bassoonist

Karen Borca (born September 5, 1948, in Green Bay, Wisconsin) is an American avant-garde jazz and free jazz bassoonist.

== Early life and education ==
Borca studied music at the University of Wisconsin with John Barrows and Arthur Weisberg, graduating in 1971.

While at the University of Wisconsin, she met Cecil Taylor, who taught at the university during the 1970/1971 academic year. Borca studied with Taylor, played in his big bands, ensembles, and the Cecil Taylor Unit, and was his assistant while he worked in the Black Music Program at Antioch College in Yellow Springs, Ohio.

She was an assistant to Taylor's longtime collaborator, saxophonist Jimmy Lyons, while he was artist-in-residence at Bennington College in Bennington, Vermont in 1974. Borca and Lyons got married, and she played in his ensemble until he died in 1986.

== Career ==
In 1976, Borca performed in a production of Adrienne Kennedy's A Rat's Mass directed by Cecil Taylor at La MaMa Experimental Theatre Club in the East Village of Manhattan. Musicians Rashid Bakr, Andy Bey, David S. Ware, Raphe Malik, and Lyons also performed in the production. Taylor's production combined the original script with a chorus of orchestrated voices used as instruments.

Borca has performed with her own ensembles at the Newport Jazz Festival New York City Salute to Women in Jazz in 1978 and 1979, Soundscape, Vision Festival, and Jazz Fest Berlin, among many other festivals and concerts. She has performed in the United States and internationally, with musicians such as William Parker, Bill Dixon, Butch Morris, Marco Eneidi, Joel Futterman, Sonny Simmons, Alan Silva, and Jackson Krall.

== Discography ==
As leader

- 2024: Good News Blues (NoBusiness Records)

With Jimmy Lyons

- 1978: Push Pull (Hathut Records)
- 1980: Riffs (Hathut Records)
- 1985: Give It Up (Black Saint Records)
- 1983: Wee Sneezawee (Black Saint Records)
- 1972–1985: The Box Set (Ayler)

With Alan Silva

- 1999: Alan Silva & the Sound Visions Orchestra (Eremite Records)
- 2003: H.Con.Res.57/Treasure Box (Eremite Records)

With others

- 1982: Red Snapper: Paul Murphy at CBS (Paul Murphy, Cadence Jazz Records)
- 1983: Cloudburst (Paul Murphy, Murphy Records)
- 1983: Moments (Joel Futterman, Ear Rational)
- 1984: Passage (Joel Futterman, Ear Rational)
- 1986: Winged Serpent (Sliding Quadrants) (Cecil Taylor, Soul Note Records)
- 1994: Final Disconnect Notice (Marco Eneidi, Botticelli)
- 1999: Many Rings (Joe Morris, Knitting Factory)
- 2001: Waking the Living, Earth People (Undivided Vision)
- 2001: The Cosmosamatics (Sonny Simmons, Boxholder)
- 2008: 17 Musicians in Search of a Sound: Darfur (Bill Dixon, AUM Fidelity)
- 2003 Sky Readers - (Undivided Vision Records) North Country Distribution
- 2003 Simple...Ins't It?? (Undivided Vision Records) North Country Distribution
- 2005 Now Is Rising -(2005 - Undivided Vision Records) North Country Distribution
- 2007 Bang! from New York City (Undivided Vision Records) North Country Distribution
