= Raphe Malik =

American jazz musician (1948–2006)

Raphe Malik (born as Laurence Mazel; November 1, 1948, in Cambridge, Massachusetts – March 8, 2006, in Guilford, Vermont) was an American jazz trumpeter.

== Career ==
Malik studied at the University of Massachusetts (1966–1970), then moved to Paris, where he played with Frank Wright and members of the Art Ensemble of Chicago. After returning to Ohio, he began working with Cecil Taylor in the mid-1970s, including at Carnegie Hall and for tours of Europe. He and Taylor collaborated through much of the 1970s and 1980s. In 1976, Malik performed in a production of Adrienne Kennedy's A Rat's Mass directed by Cecil Taylor at La MaMa Experimental Theatre Club in the East Village of Manhattan. Musicians Rashid Bakr, Andy Bey, Karen Borca, David S. Ware, and Jimmy Lyons also performed in the production. Taylor's production combined the original script with a chorus of orchestrated voices used as instruments.

In the 1990s, Malik recorded several albums as a leader, and played with Dennis Warren in the Full Metal Revolutionary Jazz Ensemble.

== Discography ==
=== As leader ===
| Title | Label | Year released | Notes |
|---|---|---|---|
| 21st Century Texts | FMP | 1992 | quintet: with Glenn Spearman, Brian Nelson (saxophone), Larry Roland (bass), Dennis Warren (drums); live recorded in 1991 |
| Sirens Sweet & Slow | OutSounds | 1994 | quintet: with Glenn Spearman, Brian Nelson (saxophone), Larry Roland, Jamyll Jones (bass), Dennis Warren (drums); recorded in 1991 |
| The Short Form | Eremite | 1997 | quartet: with Glenn Spearman (saxophone), George Langford (bass), Dennis Warren (drums); live recorded in 1996 |
| ConSequences | Eremite | 1999 | quartet: with Sabir Mateen (sax), William Parker (bass), Denis Charles (drums) |
| Storyline | Boxholder | 2000 | trio: with Cecil McBee (bass), Cody Moffett (drums) |
| Looking East: A Suite in Three Parts | Boxholder | 2001 | quartet: with Sabir Mateen (saxophone), Larry Roland (bass), Cody Moffett (drums) |
| Speak Easy | Le Systeme | 2001 | solo trumpet |
| Companions | Eremite | 2002 | quartet: with Glenn Spearman (saxophone), William Parker (bass), Paul Murphy (drums) |
| Sympathy | Boxholder | 2004 | trio: with Joe McPhee (saxophone and trumpet), Donald Robinson (drums) |
| Last Set: Live at the 1369 Jazz Club | Boxholder | 2004 | quartet: with Frank Wright (saxophone), William Parker (bass), Syd Smart (drums); recorded in 1984 |

=== As sideman ===
With Jimmy Lyons

- Wee Sneezawee (Black Saint, 1983)
- The Box Set (Ayler, 2003)

With Sabir Mateen

- Secrets of When (Bleu Regard, 2001)

With Alan Silva

- Alan Silva & the Sound Visions Orchestra (Eremite, 2001) – live recorded in 1999

With Glenn Spearman

- Free Worlds (Black Saint, 2000)

With Cecil Taylor

- 1976: Dark to Themselves (Enja, 1977)
- 1978: Cecil Taylor Unit (New World, 1978)
- 1978: 3 Phasis (New World, 1978)
- 1978: Live in the Black Forest (MPS, 1978) – live
- 1978: One Too Many Salty Swift and Not Goodbye (Hat Hut, 1980) – live
- 1980: It Is in the Brewing Luminous (Hat Hut, 1981) – live
