= Paul Murphy (musician) =

American drummer (born 1949)

Paul F. Murphy
- Birth name: Paul Florence Murphy
- Born: January 25, 1949; Worcester, Massachusetts, U.S.
- Genres: Jazz, free jazz, avant-garde jazz
- Occupation: Musician
- Instrument: Percussion

Paul Florence Murphy (born January 25, 1949) is a percussionist, bandleader and composer. He is best known for having led a variety of small jazz ensembles, and for his long tenure in groups led by saxophonist Jimmy Lyons.

== Career ==
Murphy began playing drums at a very early age, and made the acquaintance of Gene Krupa at age six. He went on to study with Krupa, Louis Bellson, and Joseph Levitt, the principal percussionist of the National Symphony Orchestra and director of the Peabody Conservatory.

At age sixteen, Murphy began playing in the Washington, D.C. area with Duke Ellington's bassist Billy Taylor, who exposed him to the music of pianist Cecil Taylor. At Billy Taylor's advice, Murphy moved to San Francisco, where he established himself as a bandleader. While there, he met and befriended Cecil Taylor and Jimmy Lyons. At the suggestion of Lyons, he then moved to New York, where he managed Ali's Alley, a club run by drummer Rashied Ali, and began playing and recording with Lyons' groups as well as his own quintet. While in New York, Murphy immersed himself in both the experimental jazz and punk rock scenes.

Following Lyons' untimely death in 1986, Murphy spent time playing drums in Las Vegas, then moved back to San Francisco, where he formed Trio Hurricane with saxophonist Glenn Spearman and bassist William Parker. He moved back to the Washington, D.C. area in 1990, and has since collaborated with pianists Joel Futterman and Larry Willis, poet Jere Carroll, and others.

Murphy has been described as "a fluent, compositionally minded master drummer." One reviewer wrote "It is hard to believe that Murphy is actually moving through space as he moves from one part of the drum set to another because the action is seamless... Murphy uses every tool he has on every drum surface; hands, brushes, mallets and sticks on snare, tom, cymbals, bass and bongos. The drumming possesses substantial physicality even in its subtleties, and often an incredibly rapid and feather-light touch." Another reviewer described him as "a drummer/sound painter who totally trusts his wildest creative impulses."

== Discography ==
=== As leader or co-leader ===
- In a Dream Stream: Paul Murphy at CBS (Murphy Records, 1981 [1983]) with Mary Anne Driscoll
- Red Snapper: Paul Murphy at CBS (CIMP, 1982 [2003]) with Jimmy Lyons, Dewey Johnson, Karen Borca, Mary Anne Driscoll
- Cloudburst: Paul Murphy at RCA (Murphy Records, 1983) with Jimmy Lyons, Dewey Johnson, Karen Borca, Mary Anne Driscoll
- Breakaway (Murphy Records, 2001) with Joel Futterman and Jere Carroll
- Enarre (Cadence, 2002) with Joel Futterman and Kash Killion
- Shadow * Intersections * West (Cadence, 2004) with Marco Eneidi and Kash Killion
- The Powers of Two (Mapleshade, 2004) with Larry Willis
- The Powers of Two, Volume 2 (Mapleshade, 2006) with Larry Willis
- Excursions (Murphy Records, 2007 [2008]) with Larry Willis
- Exposé (Murphy Records, 2008) with Larry Willis
- Foundations (Murphy Records, 2009) with Larry Willis
- Freedom's Bell (Murphy Records, 2017) with Larry Willis, Jere Carroll, and Dominic Fragman

With Trio Hurricane (Murphy, Glenn Spearman, and William Parker)

- Suite of Winds (Black Saint Records, 1986)
- Live at Fire in the Valley (Eremite Records, 1997)

=== As sideman ===
With Jimmy Lyons

- Riffs (hat MUSICS, 1982)
- Wee Sneezawee (Black Saint Records, 1984)
- Give It Up (Black Saint Records, 1985)
- The Box Set (Ayler Records, 2003)

With Larry Willis

- Sunshower (Mapleshade, 2001)

With Raphe Malik

- Companions (Eremite Records, 2002)

With Eddie Gale

- A Minute With Miles (Mapleshade, 1992)

With Mary Anne Driscoll

- Inside Out (CIMP, 2004)

With Kendra Shank

- Afterglow (Mapleshade, 1994)

With Windmill Saxophone Quartet

- Touch of Evil (Mapleshade, 2002)

Compilations

- Vision Volume One: Vision Festival 1997 Compiled (AUM Fidelity, 1998)

== Documentaries ==
- Inside Out in the Open
