= Short form =

Short form may refer to:

- Short-form content
- Short form cricket, a reduced version of cricket
- Shortform improvisation, a form of improvisational comedy
- in linguistics, a synonym for abbreviation
- Form 1040A, also known as "the short form", an American tax form
- a type of census questionnaire
- Sub-styles of Yang-style tai chi
- The Short Form, a 1997 album by Raphe Malik

== See also ==
- Short (disambiguation)
- Long form (disambiguation)
