= The Box Set (Jimmy Lyons album) =

Live album by Jimmy Lyons
- Released: 2003
- Recorded: 1972–1985
- Genre: Free jazz
- Labels: Ayler Records aylCD-036-040

Jimmy Lyons chronology
Give It Up (1985)	The Box Set (2003)

The Box Set is a five-CD album, most of which was recorded live, by saxophonist Jimmy Lyons. It was recorded at a variety of locations from 1972 to 1985, and was released in limited quantities by Ayler Records in 2003. The album includes a 60-page booklet featuring photos and essays on Lyons by Ben Young and Ed Hazell.

== Reception ==
Professional ratings
Review scores
Source	Rating
The Penguin Guide to Jazz	3.5/4 stars
Tom Hull – on the Web	A−

The authors of The Penguin Guide to Jazz called the album "oddly moving," and commented: "The sheer bulk of material is less impressive than the doggedness of Lyons's search for a sound that led the alto saxophone on from Charlie Parker's innovations... and towards a new freedom of expression... it was... Lyons's sympathetic merging of personalities with others... that made him such a quietly compelling figure."

In a review for JazzTimes, Bill Shoemaker referred to the album as "a triumph," and wrote: "There is no more direct route connecting Charlie Parker to the '60s and its ongoing aftermath than Jimmy Lyons."

Rex Butters, in an article for All About Jazz, remarked: "While the tapes were recorded casually without thought of commercial release, the performances themselves override any quibbling over sound quality... Priding itself on the quality of its unissued live performances, Ayler has added a valuable entry to the Jimmy Lyons discography." In a separate All About Jazz review, Clifford Allen wrote: "this is an excellent resource. One can more clearly understand the singular impact of Lyons' voice separated from his usual pianistic foil, and one can also see the importance of that foil to Lyons' development. Five different contexts give both the Lyons scholar and the curious onlooker a varied program of material to sift through, and suffice it to say, Jimmy Lyons is more firmly cemented in jazz history because of this set."

Writing for One Final Note, Joe Milazzo stated that the album represented "some of the strongest music Lyons ever made," and noted that Lyons "seems an inexhaustible font of ideas not so much because the content of his solos, phrase by phrase, well-defined note by well-defined note, is so remarkable. It is because Lyons knows that it is not just the individual ideas themselves, but how they interface with each other that matters. All tissue is connective tissue, in a sense. What is so amazing is that this breakneck processing of melodic variations, tightly organized but separated utterly from any sort of harmonic foundation, is the foundation of Lyons' approach. Lyons departs from a point that most musicians would consider a destination: his instrumental virtuosity really is a manifestation of self-knowledge."

Critic Tom Hull wrote: "Lyons' selflessness may have been the secret of the Cecil Taylor Unit's success. Without naming anyone, Taylor once said, 'It's rare to find musicians who are loyal and protect you and give you space to be yourself. You learn to value them highly and to give them the same space they give you.' The Box Set was specially designed for fans who care as much about that space."

In an article for Dusted Magazine, Derek Taylor remarked: "None of Lyons' solo recordings incorporate piano and the same holds true for six-plus hours of music issued on this sumptuous five-disc Box Set by Ayler Records. Proof of his talent and creativity, Lyons' melodic and harmonic facility makes the absence hardly noticeable. His compositions actually work better without a chordal anchor to ground them, and there are plenty of examples in this set that bear this claim out."

A review at the Tangents web site stated: "this is an unmissable document of a truly outstanding jazz man in fine company and, for my money, the 'box of the year'."

== Track listing ==
Disc 1, track 6 by Thelonious Monk. Disc 4, track 5 by Karen Borca. All other compositions by Jimmy Lyons.

=== Disc 1 ===
1. "Jump Up" – 10:02
2. "Gossip" – 14:04
3. "Ballad One" – 15:14
4. "Mr. 1-2-5 Street" – 11:18
5. "Jump Up # 2" – 17:28
6. "Round Midnight" – 7:37
- Recorded at Studio Rivbea, New York City, September 15–17, 1972.

=== Disc 2 ===
1. "Family" – 41:24
2. "Heritage I" – 37:18
- Recorded at Studio Rivbea, New York City, June 30, 1975.

=== Disc 3 ===
1. "Heritage II" – 13:36
2. "Clutter" – 20:02
3. "Mary Mary Intro" – 11:41
4. "Never" – 6:09
5. "Configuration C" – 5:18
6. "Repertoire Riffin'" – 14:29
7. "Impro-Scream & Clutter II" – 7:21
- Track 1 recorded at Studio Rivbea, New York City, June 30, 1975. Tracks 2–7 recorded at Soundscape, New York City, April 9, 1981.

=== Disc 4 ===
1. "Wee Sneezawee" – 13:38
2. "After You Left" – 9:24
3. "Theme" – 10:40
4. "Shakin' Back" – 10:55
5. "Good News Blues" – 11:06
6. "Jimmy Lyons Interview" – 11:41
- Tracks 1–5 recorded at Geneva, Switzerland, May 12, 1984. Track 6 recorded at and broadcast by WKCR-FM, "Jazz Alternatives", New York City, July 27, 1978.

=== Disc 5 ===
1. "Wee Sneezawee" – 13:15
2. "After You Left" – 9:39
3. "Tortuga" – 13:09
4. "Gossip" – 9:27
5. "Shakin' Back" – 13:02
6. "Driads" – 15:49
7. "Jump Up" – 0:36
- Recorded at Tufts University, Medford, Massachusetts during the Tufts Jazz Festival, February 12, 1985.

== Personnel ==
- Jimmy Lyons – alto saxophone
- Karen Borca – bassoon (disc 4, tracks 1–5; disc 5)
- Raphe Malik – trumpet (disc 1)
- Hayes Burnett – bass (disc 1; disc 2; disc 3, track 1)
- William Parker – bass (disc 5)
- Sidney Smart – drums (disc 1)
- Henry Letcher – drums (disc 2; disc 3, track 1)
- Paul Murphy – drums (disc 4, tracks 1–5; disc 5)
