= The Big Push =

Studio album by Larry Willis
- Released: January 31, 2006
- Recorded: May 9, 2005
- Studio: Van Gelder Studio, Englewood Cliffs, NJ
- Genre: Jazz
- Length: 52:49
- Label: HighNote; HCD 7144
- Producer: Don Sickler

Larry Willis chronology
| The Powers of Two (2004) | The Big Push (2006) | Blue Fable (2007) |

The Big Push is an album by pianist Larry Willis which was recorded in 2005 and released on the Highnote label early the following year.

== Reception ==
Professional ratings
Review scores
| Source | Rating |
|---|---|
| Allmusic | 4/5 stars |
| All About Jazz | 3.5/5 stars |
| The Penguin Guide to Jazz Recordings | 4/4 stars |

The review by Allmusic's Scott Yanow said: "Long a greatly in-demand sideman, pianist Larry Willis excels during this opportunity to lead his own trio. ... The interpretations are lyrical, quietly emotional, harmonically sophisticated, and full of subtle surprises. This is the type of jazz recording that grows in interest with each listen, for there is a great deal happening just beneath the surface. Recommended". All About Jazz' Michael P. Gladstone observed "In choosing a trio for The Big Push, Willis selected drummer Al Foster, his old student partner from the High School of Music & Art in Manhattan, and the in-demand bassist Buster Williams. The tunes are a combination of a few sturdy standards, two originals and jazz standards. ,,, Buster Williams steps in frequently to provide fine support for Willis, notably on the ballads and mid-tempo tracks; Al Foster supplies just the right touch for the cookers as well as the tastefulness needed on the ballads". JazzTimes' Thomas Conrad noted "This is a classy recital, made even more fun by Van Gelder’s clean, full-bandwidth sound". The 2008 edition of The Penguin Guide to Jazz Recordings described it as one of the best piano trio albums of recent years.

== Track listing ==
All compositions by Larry Willis except where noted

1. "The Surrey with the Fringe on Top" (Richard Rodgers, Oscar Hammerstein II) – 6:27
2. "Today's Nights" (Joe Ford) – 6:36
3. "The Day You Said Goodbye" – 6:25
4. "Just Wait and See" (Tony Pancella) – 6:12
5. "Annika's Lullaby" – 5:45
6. "I Have a Dream" (Herbie Hancock) – 7:44
7. "Everything I Have Is Yours" (Burton Lane, Harold Adamson) – 3:59
8. "The Big Push" (Wayne Shorter) – 4:39
9. "Poppa Nat" – 5:02

== Personnel ==
- Larry Willis – piano
- Buster Williams – bass
- Al Foster – drums

=== Production ===
- Don Sickler - producer
- Rudy Van Gelder - engineer
