= Last Set: Live at the 1369 Jazz Club =

Live album by Raphe Malik
- Released: 2004
- Recorded: September 13, 1984
- Venue: The 1369 Jazz Club, Cambridge, Massachusetts
- Genre: Jazz
- Length: 55:14
- Label: Boxholder
- Producer: Raphe Malik

Raphe Malik chronology
Sympathy (2004)	Last Set: Live at the 1369 Jazz Club (2004)

Last Set: Live at the 1369 Jazz Club is an album by American jazz trumpeter Raphe Malik recorded in 1984 but not issued until 2004 by the Boxholder label. The live set adds tenor saxophonist Frank Wright as special guest to the regular trio of Malik, bassist William Parker and drummer Syd Smart.

== Background ==
In the 70s Malik was a member of the Jimmy Lyons' quartet and the Cecil Taylor Unit. In 1984 he was leading a trio who played regularly in Boston. The drummer was Sydney Smart, who played with Malik in Taylor's ensemble at Antioch from 1971 to 1973, and in the Jimmy Lyons Quartet that debuted in New York in 1972. The bassist was William Parker, a member of the Cecil Taylor Unit since 1980. Malik has first met saxophonist Frank Wright in Paris in 1970.

== Reception ==
Professional ratings
Review scores
Source	Rating
AllMusic	4/5 stars
The Penguin Guide to Jazz	3.5/4 stars

In his review for AllMusic, Eugene Chadbourne says "Even if Malik had been releasing lots of new material circa 1984 this would still be a valuable recording, one that ought to make even the seasoned free jazz listener stomp his foot in approval."

The Penguin Guide to Jazz describes the album as "a storming quartet date which benefits inmeasurably from the presence of both Wright and Parker" and notes that "while the soud is ragged in places, it's an exciting reminder of what died with Malik in early 2006."

The All About Jazz review by Trevor MacLaren says "Last Set: Live at the 1369 Jazz Club is a great 'lost' recording from some of the genre's premier musicians. And like much of the music from this style, it still sounds fresh."

In his review for JazzTimes David R. Adler notes "Malik stretches on three original pieces (nearly an hour of music), sounding brash and inventive. The recording is rough but full-bodied and clear."

== Track listing ==
All compositions by Raphe Malik

1. "Sad C" – 15:02
2. "Companions #2" – 29:56
3. "Chaser" – 10:16

== Personnel ==
- Raphe Malik – trumpet
- Frank Wright – tenor sax, voice
- William Parker – bass
- Syd Smart – drums
