= Companions (album) =

Live album by Raphe Malik
- Released: 2002
- Recorded: May 25, 1998
- Venue: Angel Orensanz Center, New York City
- Genre: Jazz
- Length: 41:14
- Label: Eremite
- Producer: Michael Ehlers

Raphe Malik chronology
Speak Easy (2001)	Companions (2002)	Sympathy (2004)

Companions is an album by American jazz trumpeter Raphe Malik, which was recorded live at the 1998 Vision Festival during a Jimmy Lyons tribute and released on the Eremite label. Malik leads a quartet with the members of the Trio Hurricane: tenor saxophonist Glenn Spearman, bassist William Parker and drummer Paul Murphy.

== Reception ==
Professional ratings
Review scores
Source	Rating
AllMusic	4.5/5 stars
The Penguin Guide to Jazz	3/4 stars

In his review for AllMusic, Steve Loewy states "The trumpeter boasts a distinct style, a rough-edged, fat sound, coupled with a concept that absorbs the innovations of Don Cherry and Bobby Bradford, yet retains its own originality. When joined with his musical blood brother, the late Glenn Spearman, the trumpeter creates harmonies that open the heavens."

The Penguin Guide to Jazz says about Spearman "He looks desperately ill on the cover but is still in fierily good voice, burning through an impassioned if slightly shapeless solo on the opening 'Lyons Jump'."

The All About Jazz review by Kurt Gottschalk notes "the real star here is the leader. Malik's playing is crystalline and uplifting. For 40 minutes, they create a celebration, a fast-pitched rollick of uplifting music."

== Track listing ==
All compositions by Raphe Malik

1. "Lyon's Jump" – 13:24
2. "Emblematic" – 10:38
3. "Health Food" – 9:53
4. "Bend" – 7:19

== Personnel ==
- Raphe Malik – trumpet
- Paul Murphy - trap drums
- William Parker – bass
- Glenn Spearman – tenor sax
