= Burnt Offering (album) =

Live album by Jimmy Lyons and Andrew Cyrille
- Released: 1991
- Recorded: May 15, 1982
- Venue: IMPROVCO concert, Allentown, Pennsylvania
- Genre: Jazz
- Length: 49:38
- Label: Black Saint; 120 130-1
- Producer: Giovanni Bonandrini

Jimmy Lyons chronology
Something in Return (1988)	Burnt Offering (1991)	Wee Sneezawee (1983)

Andrew Cyrille chronology
Irène Schweizer & Andrew Cyrille (1989)	Burnt Offering (1991)	Galaxies (1991)

Burnt Offering is a live album by American jazz saxophonist Jimmy Lyons and American jazz drummer Andrew Cyrille. It was recorded in May 1982 in Allentown, Pennsylvania, and released by the Black Saint label in 1991.

In an interview for JazzTimes, when asked about the recording, Cyrille stated: "Jimmy was coming out of Charlie Parker. He sounds almost exactly like Charlie Parker in tone. And I was coming out of Max and Roy Haynes and what all those guys had done with Bird too, see, because I was really into all that."

== Reception ==
Professional ratings
Review scores
Source	Rating
AllMusic	4/5 stars
The Penguin Guide to Jazz	3.5/4 stars
Tom Hull – on the Web	B
The Rolling Stone Jazz & Blues Album Guide	3/5 stars

The AllMusic review awarded the album 4 stars.

The authors of The Penguin Guide to Jazz awarded the album 3½ stars, and wrote: "Among the most fruitful encounters of Lyons's sadly under-documented career were his duos with Cyrille, a fellow-alumnus of Cecil Taylor Academy. Cyrille is a one-man orchestra, conjuring layered energies... 'Exotique'... is a wonderfully structured and emotionally committed performance... superb examples of two masters in flight."

Writing for Audiophile Audition, Doug Simpson commented: "Throughout the 48 minutes, Lyons blows nimble, sometimes slashing notes, knotty phrases, and now and then steps out to yield space for Cyrille's percussive lashes... 'Popp-A' is brash and budges with staccato bursts of sax and drums... 'Exotique' has an Asiatic percussive trait, while Lyons' themes are relatively more harmonious than the rest of the set list. The concert's apex is the almost 24-minute title track where Lyons and Cyrille prod each other, commingle percussive elements, and Lyons intermittently slips in refrains which mirror conventional jazz choruses, while accommodating an articulate inventiveness."

== Track listing ==
1. "Popp-A" (Andrew Cyrille) – 15:03
2. "Exotique" (Andrew Cyrille) – 9:47
3. "Burnt Offering" (Jimmy Lyons) – 23:48
- Recorded at an IMPROVCO concert, Allentown, PA on May 15, 1982.

== Personnel ==
- Jimmy Lyons - alto saxophone
- Andrew Cyrille - percussion
