= Excursions (Paul Murphy and Larry Willis album) =

Studio album by Paul Murphy and Larry Willis
- Released: 2008
- Recorded: April 2007
- Studio: Lion and Fox Studios
- Genre: Free jazz
- Label: Murphy Records
- Producer: Paul Murphy and Larry Willis

Paul Murphy chronology
The Powers of Two, Volume 2 (2006)	Excursions (2008)	Exposé (2008)

Excursions is an album by drummer Paul Murphy and pianist Larry Willis. It was released by Murphy Records in 2008.

== Reception ==
Professional ratings
Review scores
Source	Rating
All About Jazz	4.5/5 stars

In a review for All About Jazz, Lyn Horton wrote: "This music evokes no largesse, only thoughtfulness and solace. Abstraction is not as much the focus in this music as it is a concise, direct delivery of fluid musical notions that seem to be right at the tips of the fingers of these two musicians... their prowess provides a refreshing approach to create a conversation that shows no pressure to go beyond the pristine limits that the recording provides... the integrity of the entire recording is unquestionable. The desire of the two musicians to keep within the parameters of muted-ness shows through and presents an edge to the playing that qualifies this music as non-explosive. The listener can go no further than the sound allows."

In a separate All About Jazz article, Francis Lo Kee commented: "Murphy's drumming is 'free' but driving in 'jazz time'... The aural hurricane by this excellent pairing of musicians is intense."

== Track listing ==
Track 6 by George Gershwin. Remaining tracks by Larry Willis and Paul Murphy.

1. "A Prayer for all Ages" – 6:02
2. "Night Fall" – 7:56
3. "Eclipse" – 6:28
4. "A Tender Heart" – 4:13
5. "Slippery Slope" – 5:46
6. "My Man's Gone Now" – 7:53
7. "Excursions" – 4:08
8. "Ostinato" – 7:33
9. "Long Road Home" – 5:58
10. "Dance of the Sun Sisters" – 4:56
11. "Sonny's Quantum Leap" – 5:24
12. "Four Stations" – 7:02

== Personnel ==
- Larry Willis – piano
- Paul Murphy – drums
