= Inner Crisis =

Studio album by Larry Willis
- Released: 1973
- Recorded: 1973
- Studio: New York, NY
- Genre: Jazz
- Length: 36:18
- Label: Groove Merchant; GM 514
- Producer: Sonny Lester

Larry Willis chronology
A New Kind of Soul (1970)	Inner Crisis (1973)	My Funny Valentine (1988)

Inner Crisis is an album by American jazz pianist Larry Willis recorded in 1973 and released on the Groove Merchant label.

== Reception ==
Professional ratings
Review scores
Source	Rating
Allmusic	4/5 stars
The Penguin Guide to Jazz Recordings	3/4 stars

Allmusic's Thom Jurek said: "Inner Crisis by Larry Willis is one of the very finest examples of electric jazz-funk from the mid-'70s. ... Willis assembled a session that was long on composition and tight on the big groove. Willis' long front lines accentuated deep soul and blues' cadences that were hallmarks of music that walked the line between tough lean groove and the pulsating rhythm of disco without losing its jazz roots to sterile fusion tropes, thanks in large part to his willingness as a pianist to play as part of an ensemble rather than as a soloist".

== Track listing ==
All compositions by Larry Willis

1. "Out on the Coast" – 4:30
2. "153rd Street Theme" – 6:43
3. "Inner Crisis" – 6:25
4. "Bahamian Street Dance" – 4:32
5. "For a Friend" – 6:58
6. "Journey's End" – 7:11

== Personnel ==
- Larry Willis – piano, electric piano
- Dave Bargeron − trombone (tracks 1, 4 & 6)
- Harold Vick − tenor saxophone, soprano saxophone
- Roland Prince − guitar
- Roderick Gaskin (tracks 2, 3 & 5) – bass guitar
- Eddie Gómez (tracks 1, 4 & 6) – bass
- Warren Benbow (tracks 1, 4 & 6), Al Foster (tracks 2, 3 & 5) − drums
