= Exposé (Paul Murphy and Larry Willis album) =

Studio album by Paul Murphy and Larry Willis
- Released: 2008
- Genre: Free jazz
- Label: Murphy Records

Paul Murphy chronology
Excursions (2008)	Exposé (2008)	Foundations (2009)

Exposé is an album by drummer Paul Murphy and pianist Larry Willis. It was released by Murphy Records in 2008.

== Reception ==
Professional ratings
Review scores
Source	Rating
All About Jazz	4.5/5 stars

In a review for All About Jazz, Lyn Horton wrote: "An improvisation this clean can only arise through expertise, confidence and vision. Murphy and Willis do not intend to throw the listener out of the park, rather have come together to deliver a message that glistens... The ease with which they construct more than take apart lends nothing but forward motion to the music... On the whole, the ride through this recording is headstrong, without deviation and is breathtakingly lyrical in several captivating instances... The music is irrevocably consistent, melodically large and often comes across as being played by a quartet rather than by a duo... A complete and fulfilling sound burns through every moment of musical time when Willis and Murphy interact instrumentally. One sure-fired stroke after another."

In a separate All About Jazz article, Francis Lo Kee commented: "On 'Titanium'... Willis and Murphy soar together before they are even a minute into the piece. When Murphy moves away from the cymbals and towards a drum that sounds like a bongo, Willis responds by getting softer and thinning out the texture: fewer notes, pointillism in sound until the piece ends with a single bongo note. Willis' lines here are very focused and the energy with which both musicians play recalls the sound of Murphy with [Jimmy] Lyons. But even one of the strongest altos on the planet could only play one note at a time; 'Night Shapes' starts out quietly, but begins to increase in energy as Willis finds two-fisted chords to urge Murphy forward. The aural hurricane by this excellent pairing of musicians is intense."

== Track listing ==
1. "Titanium" – 3:40
2. "Exposé" – 6:02
3. "Liquid Dance" – 5:58
4. "Swing Check" – 5:33
5. "Labryinth" – 5:00
6. "Introspectus" – 4:58
7. "Night Shapes" – 6:08
8. "West Lens" – 3:37
9. "Deeply Embraced" – 6:44
10. "Soft Pursuit" – 5:16
11. "Exit 25" – 5:37

== Personnel ==
- Larry Willis – piano
- Paul Murphy – drums
