= This Time the Dream's on Me (album) =

Studio album by Larry Willis
- Released: May 22, 2012
- Recorded: November 12 & 13, 2011
- Studio: Fazioli Concert Hall, Sacile, Italy
- Genre: Jazz
- Length: 61:38
- Label: HighNote; HCD 7238
- Producer: Larry Willis, Marco Marzola

Larry Willis chronology
The Offering (2008)	This Time the Dream's on Me (2012)

This Time the Dream's on Me is a solo album by pianist Larry Willis which was recorded in 2011 and released on the Highnote label early the following year.

== Reception ==
Professional ratings
Review scores
Source	Rating
Allmusic	4/5 stars

Allmusic's Ken Dryden reviewed the album stating "Larry Willis mixes standards, jazz classics, and potent originals on this solo piano release. The sessions have a late-night, ruminative flavor ... Recorded over two days on a top-notch Fazioli grand piano, this solo piano CD is easily among Larry Willis' best recordings".

== Track listing ==
All compositions by Larry Willis except where noted

1. "This Time the Dream's on Me" (Harold Arlen, Johnny Mercer) – 5:49
2. "Sanctuary" – 7:27
3. "True Love" (Cole Porter) – 6:17
4. "Lazy Afternoon" (Jerome Moross, John La Touche) – 7:21
5. "A Single Petal of a Rose" (Duke Ellington, Billy Strayhorn) – 4:47
6. "Blues for Marco" – 5:27
7. "It Could Happen to You" (Jimmy Van Heusen, Johnny Burke) – 7:07
8. "Lotus Blossom" (Strayhorn) – 3:11
9. "Silly Blues" – 5:14
10. "My Ship" (Kurt Weill, Ira Gershwin) – 8:58

== Personnel ==
- Larry Willis – piano
