= The Offering (Larry Willis album) =

Studio album by Larry Willis
- Released: January 29, 2008
- Recorded: October 9, 2007
- Studio: Van Gelder Studio, Englewood Cliffs, NJ
- Genre: Jazz
- Length: 54:50
- Label: HighNote; HCD 7178
- Producer: Don Sickler

Larry Willis chronology
Blue Fable (2007)	The Offering (2008)	This Time the Dream's on Me (2012)

The Offering is an album by pianist Larry Willis which was recorded in 2007 and released on the Highnote label.

== Reception ==
Professional ratings
Review scores
Source	Rating
Allmusic	4/5 stars
All About Jazz	4.5/5 stars

Allmusic's Thom Jurek reviewed the album stating "Once more Willis proves that he is not only a truly gifted pianist of complexity and depth, but one with a startling array of tools at his disposal as an arranger and bandleader. While jazz fans may know his work well, he should be recognized as one of the consistently great soloists of our time. Among musicians, Willis is considered a true master, and it's time the general jazz populace discovered that as well. The Offering is another high-class, musically arresting date by an innovator". All About Jazz' John Barron observed "Although he's not nearly as well known as he should be, the veteran pianist has established himself in the upper echelon of modern jazz recording artists. The Offering finds Willis in the all-star company of bassist Eddie Gomez, drummer Billy Drummond and, for three tunes, saxophonist Eric Alexander". JazzTimes' Thomas Conrad noted "Larry Willis is a player of such solid reliability that his name on an album just about guarantees quality. He has been a premier sideman for 40 years, but he has also made valuable albums as a leader ... As a pianist Willis is best known for his powerful drive. He is underrated as a ballad player and composer. Both aptitudes are apparent on the album’s most memorable track, “Ethiopia.” Willis lets his spaced chords tell of the tragedy, darkly ringing and tolling, like death knells".

== Track listing ==
All compositions by Larry Willis except where noted

1. "The Offering" (Santi Debriano) – 6:15
2. "TD's Tune" – 7:50
3. "Alter Ego" (James Williams) – 6:48
4. "Ethiopia" – 8:52
5. "The Rock" – 8:20
6. "Three-Four Movement" (J.A. Ford) – 7:48
7. "Theme from Star Trek" (Alexander Courage) – 6:33
8. "Melancholia" (Duke Ellington) – 2:24

== Personnel ==
- Larry Willis – piano
- Eric Alexander – tenor saxophone (tracks 2, 5 & 7)
- Eddie Gómez – bass
- Billy Drummond – drums

=== Production ===
- Don Sickler - producer
- Rudy Van Gelder - engineer
