= Ghetto Music =

Studio album by Eddie Gale
- Released: 1968
- Recorded: September 20, 1968
- Studio: Van Gelder Studio, Englewood Cliffs, NJ
- Genre: Avant-garde jazz, soul jazz, free jazz, folk jazz
- Length: 40:48
- Label: Blue Note
- Producer: Francis Wolff

Eddie Gale chronology
Ghetto Music (1968)	Black Rhythm Happening (1969)

Ghetto Music is the debut album by American trumpeter Eddie Gale recorded in 1968 and released on the Blue Note label.

== Reception ==
Professional ratings
Review scores
Source	Rating
Allmusic	5/5 stars
Pitchfork	9.4/10

The Allmusic review by Thom Jurek awarded the album 5 stars and stated "The aesthetic and cultural merits of Eddie Gale's Ghetto Music cannot be overstated... This is an apocryphal album, one that seamlessly blends the new jazz of the '60s with gospel, soul, and the blues... This is some of the most spiritually engaged, forward-thinking, and finely wrought music of 1968". In 2022, in a contemporary review, Pitchfork (website) called the album 'a spiritually charged masterpiece .., a controlled and chaotic blend of free jazz, meditative soul, and gospel' and awarded it a 9.4 out of 10.

== Track listing ==
All compositions by Eddie Gale

1. "The Rain" – 6:30
2. "Fulton Street" – 6:51
3. "A Understanding" – 7:41
4. "A Walk With Thee" – 6:09
5. "The Coming of Gwilu" – 13:37

- Recorded at Rudy Van Gelder Studio, Englewood Cliffs, New Jersey on September 20, 1968.

== Personnel ==
- Eddie Gale – trumpet, thumb piano, steel drum, bird whistle
- Russell Lyle – tenor saxophone, flute
- Jo Ann Gale Stevens – guitar, vocals
- James "Tokio" Reid, Judah Samuel – bass
- Richard Hackett, Thomas Holman – drums
- Elaine Beener – lead vocals
- Sylvia Bibbs, Barbara Dove, Evelyn Goodwin, Art Jenkins, Fulumi Prince, Edward Walrond, Sondra Walston, Mildred Weston, Norman Wright – vocals
