= Riffs (Jimmy Lyons album) =

Live album by Jimmy Lyons
- Released: 1982
- Recorded: September 13–14, 1980
- Venue: Le Dreher (club), Paris
- Length: 47:45
- Label: hat MUSICS
- Producer: Pia & Werner X. Uehlinger

Jimmy Lyons chronology
Push Pull (1979)	Riffs (1982)	Jump Up / What to Do About (1981)

Riffs is a live album by American saxophonist Jimmy Lyons. It was recorded on September 13–14, 1980 at Le Dreher, a jazz club in Paris, and was released in 1982 on the hat MUSICS label. The album features Lyons on alto saxophone, Karen Borca on bassoon, Jay Oliver on bass, and Paul Murphy on drums.

== Reception ==
Professional ratings
Review scores
Source	Rating
AllMusic	4/5 stars
The Rolling Stone Jazz Record Guide	3/5 stars

In a review for AllMusic, Scott Yanow wrote: "For one of his very infrequent recordings outside of the realm of Cecil Taylor, altoist Jimmy Lyons teams up with the talented jazz bassoonist Karen Borca, bassist Jay Oliver and drummer Paul Murphy for lengthy and rather adventurous versions of 'Theme' and 'Riffs #1/II' plus the brief 'Riffs #1/I' which serves as a prelude to the longer 'Riffs.' It is always intriguing to hear Lyons stretching out without a piano and this set helped make listeners aware of Borca's brilliant playing on the rarely utilized bassoon."

== Track listing ==
All compositions by Jimmy Lyons.

1. "Theme" – 21:00
2. "Riffs #1/I" – 3:35
3. "Riffs #1/II" – 23:10

Recorded September 13–14, 1980 at Le Dreher (club) in Paris.

== Personnel ==
- Jimmy Lyons – alto saxophone
- Karen Borca – bassoon
- Jay Oliver – bass
- Paul Murphy – drums
