= Long form =

Long form or longform may refer to:

- A variety of improvisational theatre
- A type of census questionnaire
- Form 1040, an American income tax form
- Long-form journalism
- Longform.org, a long-form journalism curation website and interview podcast

== See also ==
- Short form (disambiguation)
