= Looking East: A Suite in Three Parts =

Live album by Raphe Malik
- Released: 2001
- Recorded: October 30, 1999
- Venue: Institute of Contemporary Art, Boston
- Genre: Jazz
- Length: 90:55
- Label: Boxholder
- Producer: Raphe Malik

Raphe Malik chronology
Storyline (2000)	Looking East: A Suite in Three Parts (2001)	Speak Easy (2001)

Looking East: A Suite in Three Parts is a double album by American jazz trumpeter Raphe Malik featuring a quartet with reedman Sabir Mateen, bassist Larry Roland and drummer Codaryl "Cody" Moffett, which was released on the Boxholder label. The album documents a concert performance organized by the Boston Creative Music Alliance in 1999.

== Reception ==
Professional ratings
Review scores
Source	Rating
AllMusic	3/5 stars
The Penguin Guide to Jazz	3/4 stars

In his review for AllMusic, Eugene Chadbourne states "Trumpeter Malik leads his quartet through an extended composition in a half-dozen sections, exhibiting superb timing, a sense of drama, and impeccable taste in his associates."

The Penguin Guide to Jazz notes "Malik is in top form, but Mateen tends to go off at half-cock, and very abrasive half-cock at that, which just encourages Moffet to go mad."

The All About Jazz review by John Sharpe says "Malik is a powerful player with a bright brassy sound deployed in darting, fizzing lines and heraldic fanfares."

In his review for JazzTimes Aaron Steinberg notes "Malik leaves the greatest print on the music. His brash, wide-stroke trumpet sound is highlighter-tip thick compared to most ball-point trumpet blurts, and his contributions range from fluttering strings of high notes to swaggering low notes, or fragments of boppish lines delivered with confidence and kick."

== Track listing ==
All compositions by Raphe Malik.

Disc One

1. "Zero Grade" – 11:18
2. "Fractals" – 11:54
3. "The Old Your Majesty" – 13:56
4. "The New Majesty" – 21:11

Disc Two

1. "Reversal" – 13:38
2. "Smooth Moffetting" – 18:58
3. "Cosmic G" – 14:12

== Personnel ==
- Raphe Malik – trumpet
- Sabir Mateen – tenor sax, alto sax, flute, b-flat clarinet, alto clarinet
- Larry Roland – bass
- Codaryl "Cody" Moffett - drums
