= Black Rhythm Happening =

Studio album by Eddie Gale
- Released: 1969
- Recorded: May 2, 1969
- Studio: Van Gelder Studio, Englewood Cliffs, New Jersey
- Genre: Jazz
- Length: 36:47
- Label: Blue Note

Eddie Gale chronology
Ghetto Music (1968)	Black Rhythm Happening (1969)	A Minute with Miles (1992)

Black Rhythm Happening is the second album by American trumpeter Eddie Gale recorded in 1969 and released on the Blue Note label.

== Reception ==
The Allmusic review by Thom Jurek awarded the album 4½ stars and stated "Eddie Gale's second Blue Note outing as a leader is one of the most adventurous recordings to come out of the 1960s. Black Rhythm Happening picks up where Ghetto Music left off, in that it takes the soul and free jazz elements of his debut and adds to them the sound of the church in all its guises... Black Rhythm Happening is a timeless, breathtaking recording, one that sounds as forward-thinking and militant in the 21st century as it did in 1969".

Professional ratings
Review scores
Source	Rating
Allmusic	4.5/5 stars

== Track listing ==
All compositions by Eddie Gale except as noted

1. "Black Rhythm Happening" – 2:57
2. "The Gleeker" (Gale, Joann Gale Stevens) – 2:16
3. "Song of Will" – 3:08
4. "Ghetto Love Night" – 5:30
5. "Mexico Thing" – 5:08
6. "Ghetto Summertime" – 3:13
7. "It Must Be You" – 5:44
8. "Look at Teyonda" – 9:31
- Recorded at Rudy Van Gelder Studio, Englewood Cliffs, New Jersey on May 2, 1969.

== Personnel ==
- Eddie Gale – trumpet
- Roland Alexander – soprano saxophone, flute (tracks 1–5, 7 & 8)
- Jimmy Lyons – alto saxophone (tracks 1–5, 7 & 8)
- Russell Lyle – tenor saxophone, flute (tracks 1–5, 7 & 8)
- Jo Ann Gale Stevens – guitar, vocals (tracks 1–5, 7 & 8)
- Henry Pearson, Judah Samuel – bass
- Elvin Jones – drums
- John Robinson – African drums (tracks 1–5, 7 & 8)
- Sylvia Bibbs, Charles Davis, Paula Nadine Larkin, William Norwood, Fulumi Prince, Carol Ann Robinson, Sondra Walston – vocals (tracks 1–5, 7 & 8)
