= Inside Out (Mary Anne Driscoll and Paul Murphy album) =

Studio album by Mary Anne Driscoll and Paul Murphy
- Released: 2004
- Recorded: June 15, 2004
- Studio: Gilbert Recital Hall, Canton, New York
- Genre: Free jazz
- Label: CIMP; 314

Inside Out is an album by pianist Mary Anne Driscoll and drummer Paul Murphy. It was recorded on June 15, 2004, at Gilbert Recital Hall in Canton, New York, and was released later that year by the CIMP label.

Driscoll and Murphy worked together frequently during the 1970s and 1980s, but hadn't played as a duo in 13 years prior to the recording of this album. The reunion was arranged and hosted by CIMP's Bob Rusch.

== Reception ==
Professional ratings
Review scores
Source	Rating
All About Jazz	3.5/5 stars
The Penguin Guide to Jazz	3/4 stars

In a review for All About Jazz, Derek Taylor wrote: "Many of the tracks feel like recently drawn sketches and their relative nascency adds to sensation of two souls colluding in the moment without the need of a heavily premeditated plan... Their musical bonds rejoined, the possibility of future collaborations lies ripe for realizing. With luck they'll be returning to the studio soon to continue the conversation."

The authors of The Penguin Guide to Jazz Recordings noted that Driscoll "seems to be bursting with music," while Murphy is "a sympathetic partner." They commented: "[Cecil] Tayloresque freedoms are contained within a careful sense of form: most of the tracks are completed inside five minutes, and run their course before rhetoric sets in."

One Final Note's David Dupont stated that the session "testifies to their strong musical connection and to the freshness engendered by renewing that musical tie after so many years," and remarked: "[Murphy] responds to Driscoll's sweeping atonal gestures with the right percussive architecture, helping to give them shape and dimension. He provides a wash of cymbals that ring underneath her jangling clusters and snaps snare and tom tom tattoos underneath her churning runs."

A reviewer for Avant Music News wrote: "This is a remarkably precise and explosive post Bop duo. These 16 tracks explore a number of themes, colors, and passions. It invites close-listening scrutiny as the more you listen the more you will be impressed."

== Track listing ==
Track timings not provided.

1. "Point of Reference"
2. "High Street"
3. "The Footbridge"
4. "Elene"
5. "Cymbalism"
6. "Thea"
7. "Out There"
8. "Byron's Tune"
9. "Sonny"
10. "New Way"
11. "Off the Top"
12. "Inside Out"
13. "Quick Study"
14. "Another Way"
15. "Fair Trade"
16. "Epilogue"

== Personnel ==
- Mary Anne Driscoll – piano
- Paul Murphy – drums
