= Cherry Box =

Studio album by Marco Eneidi
- Released: 2000
- Recorded: September 20, 1998
- Venue: Mills College Concert Hall, Oakland, California
- Genre: Jazz
- Length: 69:17
- Label: Eremite
- Producer: Michael Ehlers

Marco Eneidi chronology
Live at Radio Valencia (1997)	Cherry Box (2000)	Ghetto Calypso (2006)

Cherry Box is an album by American jazz saxophonist Marco Eneidi, which was recorded at Mills College, Oakland in 1998 and released on the Eremite label. He leads a trio with bassist William Parker and drummer Donald Robinson.

== Reception ==
Professional ratings
Review scores
Source	Rating
AllMusic	4/5 stars
The Penguin Guide to Jazz	4/4 stars

In his review for AllMusic, Steve Loewy states "Eneidi's somewhat thin sound is distinguished by its wailing quality, one that combines the searing cry of the prophet with a Bird-like post-bop energy.."

The Penguin Guide to Jazz says "The 1998 trio shows off Eneidi at his best, blowing fiercely enough to make his wiry saxophone sound glow with energy. Parker does his usual thing, but Robinson is the real star of the piece, providing a tireless but subtle accompaniment."

== Track listing ==
All compositions by Eneidi, Robinson, Parker.

1. "Cherry Box" – 4:11
2. "Slashing the Bird" – 13:50
3. "Forget It" – 13:56
4. "Barbequed Brahms" – 19:04
5. "One More Thing" – 12:34
6. "Spank" – 5:42

== Personnel ==
- Marco Eneidi – alto saxophone
- William Parker – bass
- Donald Robinson – drums
