= Unit Structures =

Studio album by Cecil Taylor
- Released: October 1966
- Recorded: May 19, 1966
- Studio: Van Gelder Studio (Englewood Cliffs, New Jersey)
- Genre: Free jazz
- Length: 46:27; 56:38 (CD reissue)
- Label: Blue Note
- Producer: Alfred Lion

Cecil Taylor chronology
Nefertiti, the Beautiful One Has Come (1962)	Unit Structures (1966)	Conquistador! (1966)

Professional ratings
Review scores
Source	Rating
AllMusic	5/5 stars
DownBeat	5/5 stars
The Penguin Guide to Jazz	3.5/4 stars
The Rolling Stone Jazz Record Guide	5/5 stars

Unit Structures is a studio album by the American jazz pianist Cecil Taylor, released in October 1966 by Blue Note Records.

== Background ==
Unit Structures was Taylor's first album on Blue Note; he would record Conquistador! for the label later the same year with a similar lineup, although it was not released until 1968. The album was accompanied by an essay written by Taylor entitled "Sound Structure of Subculture Becoming Major Breath/Naked Fire Gesture".

== Music ==
Jesse Jarnow of Pitchfork described Unit Structures as "among the most intense of the early free jazz albums". He continued: "The album is by no means easy listening; the atonality is unrepentant. But Taylor’s septet finds numerous gorgeous spaces as they interpret “free jazz” not just as the freedom to improvise but the freedom to invent musical worlds and hidden syntaxes. The only way to tap into the 'rhythm-sound energy found in the amplitude of each time unit,' as Taylor wrote in the liner notes, is to listen reverently."

== Critical reception and legacy ==
AllMusic gave the album five stars, with reviewer Scott Yanow opining that "Taylor's high-energy atonalism fit in well with the free jazz of the period but he was actually leading the way rather than being part of a movement...it could be safely argued that no jazz music of the era approached the ferocity and intensity of Cecil Taylor's". The Penguin Guide to Jazz awarded it three and a half stars of a possible four, writing: "Unit Structures is both as mathematically complex as its title suggests and as rich in colour and sound as the ensemble proposes, with the orchestrally varied sounds of the two bassists — Grimes a strong, elemental driving force, Silva tonally fugitive and mysterious — while Stevens and McIntyre add other hues and Lyons improvises with and against them."

In 2008, webzine Cokemachineglow included Unit Structures on their "30 'Other' Albums of the 1960s" list. In 2013, Spin included it on their "Top 100 Alternative Albums of the 1960s" list. In 2017, Pitchfork placed it at number 197 on their list of the "200 Best Albums of the 1960s".

In 2017, Jesse Jarnow of Pitchfork wrote: "Unit Structures still challenges notions of musical freedom. Recorded during the same season that the psychedelic ballroom scene was starting to bubble in San Francisco, Unit Structures did more to disassemble music than nearly all of the light-show-drenched psychedelia that followed."

== Track listing ==
All tracks are written by Cecil Taylor.

No.	Title	Length
1.	"Steps"	10:20
2.	"Enter, Evening"	11:06
3.	"Enter, Evening (Alternate Take)" (CD edition bonus track)	10:11
4.	"Unit Structure/As of a Now/Section"	17:47
5.	"Tales (8 Whisps)"	7:14

== Personnel ==
Credits adapted from liner notes.

Performers

- Eddie Gale – trumpet
- Jimmy Lyons – alto saxophone
- Ken McIntyre – alto saxophone, oboe, bass clarinet
- Cecil Taylor – piano, bells
- Henry Grimes – double bass
- Alan Silva – double bass
- Andrew Cyrille – drums

Production and additional personnel

- Alfred Lion – producer
- Rudy Van Gelder – recording engineer
- Francis Wolff – photography
- Reid Miles – design
- Cecil Taylor – liner notes
- Michael Cuscuna – reissue producer (1987 CD reissue)
- Ron McMaster – digital transfer (1987 CD reissue)
