= Give It Up (Jimmy Lyons album) =

Studio album by Jimmy Lyons Quintet
- Released: 1985
- Recorded: March 6 & 7, 1985
- Genre: Jazz
- Length: 44:10
- Label: Black Saint
- Producer: Giovanni Bonandrini

Jimmy Lyons chronology
| Wee Sneezawee (1983) | Give It Up (1985) | The Box Set (2003) |

Give It Up is an album by American jazz saxophonist Jimmy Lyons recorded in 1985 for the Italian Black Saint label.

== Reception ==
Professional ratings
Review scores
| Source | Rating |
|---|---|
| AllMusic | 4/5 stars |
| The Penguin Guide to Jazz Recordings | 3.5/4 stars |
| Tom Hull – on the Web | B+ |

The AllMusic review by Scott Yanow awarded the album 4 stars, stating "the ensemble work is frequently exciting; and the front line boasts three distinctive and rather different (but complementary) solo voices. Highly recommended".

The authors of The Penguin Guide to Jazz wrote: "If Charlie Parker had a true heir... it was Jimmy Lyons. Compared to his light-fingered onrush, most of the bop epigones sound deeply conservative. He didn't have the greatest tone in the world: 'reedy' is the only word, ironically. Lyons's delivery was always light, the lines dizzyingly extended, and in all his work he was without obvious ego. Years of playing beside Cecil Taylor, in addition to accelerating his hand-speed, probably encouraged a certain self-effacement as well... On Give It Up, Lyons seems quite content to remain within the confines of the group. Significantly pianoless and with only a secondary role for the bassist and drummer, it resolves into a series of high, intermeshed lines from the saxophone and horn, with the bassoon tracing a sombre counterpoint."

Writing for Audiophile Audition, Doug Simpson commented: "The lead-in title track is replete with polyphonic currents, dizzying solos from Rava and Lyons, and a mostly combustible temperament highlighted by Oliver's bombastic bass and Murphy's deft handling of cymbals and sticks... 'Methods' has arresting layers, where the supportive and front parts intertwine in both restless and controlled manners... The CD's centerpiece is... 'Never.' There is much to hear and repeat listening will help to appreciate the activity... The deceptively tangled collection of chords, notes, riffs and refrains may seem haphazard, but there is a structure which can be discerned, although not easily. The fivesome finish with the restrained and lyrical 'Ballada'... The solemn arco bass, low-ebbing bassoon and Murphy's burnished brushes furnish a more or less melancholy atmosphere."

== Track listing ==
All compositions by Jimmy Lyons

1. "Give It Up" - 10:10
2. "Methods" - 11:13
3. "Never" - 19:16
4. "Ballada" - 3:31

- Recorded at Barigozzi Studio in Milano, Italy on March 6 & 7, 1985

== Personnel ==
- Jimmy Lyons - alto saxophone
- Enrico Rava - trumpet, flugelhorn
- Karen Borca - bassoon
- Jay Oliver - bass
- Paul Murphy - drums
