= Shadow Intersections West =

Studio album by Paul Murphy Trio
- Released: 2004
- Recorded: August 4, 2002
- Studio: Bias Recording Studio, Springfield, Virginia
- Genre: Free jazz
- Label: Cadence; CJR 1160
- Producer: Bob Rusch, Paul F. Murphy

Paul Murphy chronology
Red Snapper: Paul Murphy at CBS (2003)	Shadow Intersections West (2004)	The Powers of Two (2004)

Shadow Intersections West is an album by the Paul Murphy Trio, led by drummer Murphy, and featuring saxophonist Marco Eneidi and cellist Kash Killion. It was recorded on August 4, 2002, at Bias Recording Studio in Springfield, Virginia, and was released in 2004 by Cadence Jazz Records.

== Reception ==
In a review for One Final Note, Scott Hreha wrote: "The chemistry between these three musicians shows that Murphy outdid himself in choosing his collaborators... Murphy... pushes the trio to its extraordinary heights. He eschews pulse-driven rhythms for the most part, instead favoring rolling tom patterns that give the music a sense of circular, perpetual motion... the disc lives and breathes with unpredictability."

JazzWord's Ken Waxman noted that "with the right people and techniques involved, sax, drums and cello are perfectly adequate for expressing the most complex musical ideas." He commented: "the Murphy three work out heads that vary according to the prominence of each instrument... Supple in his power and restraint, textural rumbles and bounces characteristic Murphy's playing. He also avoids excessive percussion displays. Commanding when he applies bass drum pedal pressure or keeps up ride cymbal action, it often appears as if he's teasing his snares, rather than playing them. Metallic-like cuts from Killion's cello and single note expositions from Eneidi are met with the same equanimity from Murphy."

== Track listing ==
1. "Outlines" – 8:34
2. "Spectral Traces" – 7:41
3. "Ghibli" – 10:24
4. "Duo" – 5:08
5. "Winds Run" – 6:29
6. "Ixion" – 4:27
7. "Rouge" – 5:49
8. "Jacinthe" – 9:11
9. "Locked-Up" – 7:54

== Personnel ==
- Paul Murphy – drums
- Marco Eneidi – alto saxophone
- Kash Killion – cello
