= Winged Serpent (Sliding Quadrants) =

Studio album by Cecil Taylor
- Released: 1985
- Recorded: October 22–24, 1984
- Genre: Free jazz
- Length: 42:58
- Label: Soul Note

Cecil Taylor chronology
Garden (1981)	Winged Serpent (Sliding Quadrants) (1985)	Iwontunwonsi (1986)

Winged Serpent (Sliding Quadrants) is an album by Cecil Taylor recorded in Milan, Italy on October 22–24, 1984, and released on the Soul Note label. The album features performances by Taylor with Jimmy Lyons, Enrico Rava, Tomasz Stanko, Frank Wright, John Tchicai, Gunter Hampel, Karen Borca, Andre Martinez, William Parker and Rashid Bakr who are billed as the Orchestra of Two Continents.

== Reception ==
Professional ratings
Review scores
Source	Rating
AllMusic	4/5 stars
The Penguin Guide to Jazz Recordings	4/4 stars

The AllMusic review by Scott Yanow states, "On the four Taylor originals, the colorful ensembles are quite dense although there is room for individual solos and heroics. Not too surprisingly Cecil Taylor is very much in control of the music". The authors of the Penguin Guide to Jazz Recordings called the album "an important and insufficiently recognized record", and commented: "mainly these are exploding, brilliantly coloured ensemble improvisations where the horns... make superbly euphoric collective statements. Densely characterized though Taylor's music is, these musicians make their way into it with the highest courage, and the results are extraordinarily compelling."

Gary Giddins described the album as "a singularly merry caper", and wrote: "Ever since the 1961 'Bulbs' (Into the Hot), Taylor has shown a tantalizing talent for voicing saxophones; all he's ever needed is two to get a firm, woodsy, consistent sonority that sounds like nothing else in or out of jazz. This despite constancy in one chair (Lyons) and constant change in the other: Archie Shepp on Into the Hot, Ken Mclntyre on Unit Structures, Sam Rivers on The Great Concert..., and David S. Ware on Dark to Themselves... For Winged Serpent, Lyons was one of five reed players... and the variants produced by that choir moor the work. To say that Taylor is in his element, threading his way through the reeds, two brasses, two drummers, and bass, romping polyrhythmically in and around every collective outburst and sigh, is to say nothing of the measured care with which he organized his unit structures."

== Track listing ==
All compositions by Cecil Taylor.

1. "Taht" – 8:50
2. "Womb Waters Scent of the Burning Armadillo Shell" – 13:04
3. "Cun-Un-Un-An" – 7:10
4. "Winged Serpent" – 13:54

- Recorded in Milan, Italy on October 22–24, 1984

== Personnel ==
- Cecil Taylor: piano, vocals
- Jimmy Lyons: alto saxophone, vocals
- Enrico Rava: trumpet, vocals
- Tomasz Stanko: trumpet, vocals
- Frank Wright: tenor saxophone, vocals
- John Tchicai: tenor saxophone, bass clarinet, vocals
- Gunter Hampel: baritone saxophone, bass clarinet, vocals
- Karen Borca: bassoon, vocals
- William Parker: bass, vocals
- Rashid Bakr: drums, vocals
- Andre Martinez: drums, percussion, vocals
