= Wee Sneezawee =

Studio album by Jimmy Lyons Quintet
- Released: 1983
- Recorded: September 26 & 27, 1983
- Genre: Jazz
- Length: 42:45
- Label: Black Saint
- Producer: Giovanni Bonandrini

Jimmy Lyons chronology
Burnt Offering (1982)	Wee Sneezawee (1983)	Give It Up (1985)

Wee Sneezawee is an album by American jazz saxophonist Jimmy Lyons recorded in 1983 for the Italian Black Saint label.

== Reception ==
Professional ratings
Review scores
Source	Rating
AllMusic	4/5 stars
The Penguin Guide to Jazz Recordings	3/4 stars
Tom Hull – on the Web	A−

The AllMusic review awarded the album 4 stars. The New York City Jazz Record's reviewer wrote that "It's often dense and tense collectivized free jazz, but it's also radically egalitarian, each voice an equal even in the presence of Lyons' soaring virtuosity." The Penguin Guide to Jazz described the album as "the most conventional" of those recorded towards the end of Lyons's career.

Writing for Audiophile Audition, Doug Simpson commented: "Nothing Lyons recorded could be considered mainstream jazz, but over the 42 minutes, Lyons moves as close to a conventional nature as any Lyons record gets. Lyons is the leader, but there is a lot of room and space for the others. Malik shifts from unison lines with Lyons to impactful solo statements and is intense on the opening title track, matching Lyons' enlivened chords and lines. During the course of the program, Borca’s bassoon provides a deeper resonance which complements Parker’s bass, and often is the musical adhesive which grounds the five lengthy Lyons compositions."

== Track listing ==
All compositions by Jimmy Lyons

1. "Wee Sneezawee" - 7:26
2. "Gossip" - 7:29
3. "Remembrance" - 6:56
4. "Shackinback" - 9:10
5. "Driads" - 11:44

- Recorded at Vanguard Studios in New York City on September 26 & 27, 1983

== Personnel ==
- Jimmy Lyons - alto saxophone
- Raphe Malik - trumpet
- Karen Borca - bassoon
- William Parker - bass
- Paul Murphy - drums
