= Live at Fire in the Valley =

Live album by Glenn Spearman, William Parker, and Paul Murphy
- Released: 1997
- Recorded: July 26, 1997
- Venue: Fire in the Valley festival, Amherst, Massachusetts
- Genre: Jazz
- Length: 51:15
- Label: Eremite Records; MTE010
- Producer: Michael Ehlers

Trio Hurricane chronology
Suite of Winds (1986)	Live at Fire in the Valley (1997)

Live at Fire in the Valley is a live album by Trio Hurricane: saxophonist Glenn Spearman, bassist William Parker, and drummer Paul Murphy. It was recorded in July 1997 at the Fire in the Valley festival in Amherst, Massachusetts, and was released by Eremite Records later that year.

== Reception ==
Professional ratings
Review scores
Source	Rating
AllMusic	4/5 stars
The Penguin Guide to Jazz	3/4 stars

In a review for AllMusic, Steve Loewy wrote: "Spearman was a special kind of free-style musician, who could encapsulate the whole jazz tradition in a single chorus. He reached way back to the big-throated saxophone sounds of the 1940s, but updated them with advanced technique. You can hear a bit of Illinois Jacquet in his playing, but you can also find traces of Charles Lloyd and Archie Shepp. The five pieces found on this CD are attractively paced, with plenty of solo space for all three members of the group. The group sound is infused with the blues, although it is a modern distorted version from the '90s. This performance closed the Festival, and the crowd exploded with enthusiasm after each number. It is not hard to see why."

The authors of The Penguin Guide to Jazz awarded the album 3 stars, and commented: "This strong festival set derives much of its compelling power from bassist Parker, but it is Spearman compositions which dominate. 'Initiation' and 'Blues for Frank and John' almost exhaust the energies of the group... but the enthusiasm of the crowd spurs them on."

Writing for All About Jazz, Derek Taylor stated: "This disc and another offering on Soul Note represent the complete discography of the group. Though a pair of outings may seem paltry in number the heights of creative catharsis attained by the players on both demonstrate that the old adage of quality over quantity definitely holds true in the realm of improvised music. Even more importantly the music of Trio Hurricane expounds the benefits that can be reaped by subjugating the individual ego to the greater good of the group; a valuable lesson that many musicians still have yet to learn."

== Track listing ==
All compositions by Glenn Spearman.

1. "Initiation" – 12:50
2. "Blues For John & Frank" – 10:27
3. "Tones For William" – 11:41
4. "N.Y.N.Y." – 11:10
5. "The Natural" – 5:00

== Personnel ==
- Glenn Spearman – tenor saxophone
- William Parker – bass
- Paul Murphy – drums
