= Sirens Sweet & Slow =

Studio album by Raphe Malik
- Released: 1994
- Recorded: September 21, 1991
- Studio: Mapleshade, Upper Marlboro, Maryland
- Genre: Jazz
- Length: 66:18
- Label: Mapleshade
- Producer: Pierre M. Sprey

Raphe Malik chronology
21st Century Texts (1992)	Sirens Sweet & Slow (1994)	The Short Form (1997)

Sirens Sweet & Slow is an album by the American jazz trumpeter Raphe Malik, released in 1994 on Mapleshade's sublabel OutSounds. The album was recorded in three marathon sessions that resulted in enough music to fill at least four CDs. It was planned to put together two albums, but finally only the first one was issued emphasizing the ballad and lyrical side.

== Reception ==
Professional ratings
Review scores
Source	Rating
AllMusic	4/5 stars
The Penguin Guide to Jazz	3.5/4 stars

The Penguin Guide to Jazz stated: "Malik manages to play big and loud without losing focus: he rarely goes for the buzzy, spluttery effects that avant-garde brassmen ofteh rely on, and his note choices are boldly decisive."

In a review for AllMusic, Scott Yanow wrote: "This set is accurately described as 'avant-garde lyricism.' Although there are many thoughtful moments along the way, the music is primarily quite explorative, with three of the selections being complete free improvisations, and the others usually just utilizing sketches... The music certainly has plenty of fire in spots and holds one's interest throughout."

== Track listing ==
All compositions by Raphe Malik except as indicated

1. "Companions" – 12:21
2. "Trumpet-Drum Duo" (Malik-Warren) – 13:08
3. "Trumpet-Bass Duo" (Malik-Roland) – 12:16
4. "Tenor" – 20:13
5. "Pierre's Way" (Improvised) – 8:20

== Personnel ==
- Raphe Malik – trumpet
- Brian Nelson – C-melody sax
- Glenn Spearman – tenor sax on 4
- Larry Roland – bass
- Jamyll Jones - bass on 1
- Dennis Warren - drums
