= Jump Up / What to Do About =

Live album by Jimmy Lyons and Sunny Murray
- Released: 1981
- Recorded: August 30, 1980
- Venue: Jazz Festival Willisau
- Genre: Free jazz
- Label: Hat Hut Records; 2R21
- Producer: Pia Uehlinger, Werner X. Uehlinger

Jimmy Lyons chronology
Riffs (1980)	Jump Up / What to Do About (1981)	Something in Return (1981)

Jump Up / What to Do About is a two-LP live album by Jimmy Lyons and Sunny Murray. It was recorded on August 30, 1980, at Jazz Festival Willisau in Switzerland, and was released by Hat Hut Records in 1981. The album was reissued on CD in 1994 and 2012 with the title Jump Up, omitting "What To Do About," the sole track by Murray, and adding another by Lyons. On the album, Lyons and Murray are joined by bassist John Lindberg.

== Reception ==
Professional ratings
Review scores
Source	Rating
AllMusic	4.5/5 stars
All About Jazz #1	4.5/5 stars
All About Jazz #2	5/5 stars
Tom Hull – on the Web	A−

In a review of the 2012 reissue for All About Jazz, Glenn Astarita wrote: "this release highlights the band's unbridled energy and resounding clarity, abetted by the crystalline audio. It sounds like it's fresh out of the box, featuring Lyons operating in tenth gear with his radical free-bop stylizations, paving the way for future expansionism... Jump Up reaffirms his vigorous and fluent avant-garde tinged improvisational prowess, where Murray and Lindberg keep pace while often riding atop the pulse... a significant reissue that provides a highly physical and decisive muse on the art of jazz-based improvisation, as the musicians share a psychic kinship that radiates throughout."

Writing for The New York Times, Robert Palmer commented: "It may be 'free jazz,' but its open structures are not invitations to chaos. On the contrary, they offer opportunities for the musicians to spontaneously edit and order their improvisations and to demonstrate the maturity of their distinctive instrumental sounds and individual conceptions. Jump Up/What To Do About is consistently inventive, but the most striking performance on it is Mr. Lyons's 'Jump Up'... the saxophonist employs phrasing and melodic motifs that are older than the blues, and he develops them in a lucid, deliberate manner without sacrificing the deep feeling that is almost always at the core of his playing... Any listener who still hasn't managed to make a mental connection between contemporary jazz and its roots in earlier black music should listen to Jump Up/What To Do About. For that matter, anyone who is interested in great jazz should listen to it."

In an article for Point of Departure, Clifford Allen stated: "Some of the most impressive playing in this set is within the most concise pieces... Murray had found his way back to bop by the time of these recordings, creating loose rag time/no time swing on 'Tortuga' and generating massive hives of displacement elsewhere... The bassist is deserving of special mention – whether or not he was a last-minute linchpin, Lindberg's full tone, impeccable time and devilish arco are a powerful asset in bonding Lyons' flights and Murray's explosiveness and off-kilter chug. Jump Up might be a sleeper of sorts in the leaders' broad discography, but it shouldn't be."

Tom Orange, in an article at Avant Music News, wrote: "on Jump Up it's a sheer delight to hear Lyons front and center making every bit of every moment. Charlie Parker's influence on Lyons' playing has always been instantly recognizable... But completely unique is the character Lyons imparts upon the Parker influence. In fact, I can't think of a single saxophone stylist more focused than Lyons: not just in his tone, phrasing and attack, but in the horn's register. He consistently avoids the alto's lower registers and focuses his surgical precision exclusively on the middle-high range of the horn, preening and grooming his brood of lines like a mother bird. That consistency and patience makes those rare moments here... when his tone erupts into the squawking extremes, all the more ecstatic."

== Track listing ==
=== Original LP release ===
1. "Jump Up" (Lyons) – 20:10
2. "Riffs #1" (Lyons) – 22:20
3. "What To Do About #1 And #2" (Murray) – 17:15
4. "Sea Treas" (Lyons) – 9:35
5. "Riffs #5" (Lyons) – 6:50

=== CD release ===
All compositions by Jimmy Lyons.

1. "Jump Up" – 20:09
2. "Riffs #1" – 22:41
3. "Sea Treas" – 8:55
4. "Riffs #5" – 6:45
5. "Tortuga" – 7:47

== Personnel ==
- Jimmy Lyons – alto saxophone
- John Lindberg – bass
- Sunny Murray – drums
