= My Funny Valentine (Larry Willis album) =

Studio album by Larry Willis
- Released: 1988
- Recorded: February 1988
- Studio: Sound On Sound Recording, New York, NY
- Genre: Jazz
- Length: 63:07 CD release with additional tracks
- Label: Jazz City; C28Y0352
- Producer: Yoshiaki Masuo, Tony Ariga

Larry Willis chronology
Inner Crisis (1973)	My Funny Valentine (1988)	Just in Time (1989)

My Funny Valentine is an album by American jazz pianist Larry Willis recorded in 1988 and originally released on the Japanese Jazz City label before being reissued in the US on Evidence Music in 1998.

== Reception ==
Professional ratings
Review scores
Source	Rating
Allmusic	3/5 stars
The Penguin Guide to Jazz Recordings	3/4 stars

Allmusic's Michael G. Nastos said: "the Willis heard on 1988's enjoyable, if conventional, My Funny Valentine is a more conservative post-bopper/hard bopper ... Willis plays the acoustic piano exclusively on this CD, and standards are a high priority. Nothing cutting-edge occurs, just straight-ahead jazz that's honest, warm and melodic. ... all of which demonstrate how sensitive a ballad player he can be".

== Track listing ==
1. "For Openers" (Kenny Garrett) – 5:46
2. "It Could Happen to You" (Jimmy Van Heusen, Johnny Burke) – 3:18
3. "Blues for Wynton Kelly" (Larry Willis) – 6:32
4. "Who's Kidding Who?" (Gerard D'Angelo) – 8:52
5. "Rhythm-a-Ning" (Thelonious Monk) – 6:04
6. "Blood Count" (Billy Strayhorn) – 6:29
7. "My Shining Hour/I'll Be Seeing You" (Harold Arlen, Johnny Mercer/ Sammy Fain, Irving Kahal) – 6:46
8. "Lazy Afternoon" (Jerome Moross, John La Touche) – 5:16
9. "Ethiopia" (Willis) – 8:02
10. "My Funny Valentine" (Richard Rodgers, Lorenz Hart) – 6:02

== Personnel ==
- Larry Willis – piano
- Kenny Garrett – alto saxophone (tracks 1, 5 & 9)
- George Mraz – bass
- Al Foster – drums
