= Larry Willis =

American jazz pianist and composer (1942–2019)

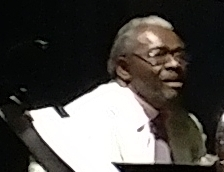

Background information
- Born: Lawrence Elliott Willis; December 20, 1942; Harlem, New York City, U.S.
- Died: September 29, 2019 (aged 76) Baltimore, Maryland, U.S.
- Genres: Jazz, jazz fusion, Afro-Cuban jazz, bebop, post-bop, avant-garde jazz
- Occupations: Musician, composer
- Instrument: Piano
- Years active: 1965–2019
- Formerly of: Blood, Sweat & Tears

Lawrence Elliott Willis (December 20, 1942 – September 29, 2019) was an American jazz pianist and composer. He performed in a wide range of styles, including jazz fusion, Afro-Cuban jazz, bebop, and avant-garde.

Willis was born in New York City. After his first year studying music theory at the Manhattan School of Music he began performing regularly with Jackie McLean. After he graduated he made his first jazz recording, McLean's Right Now! in January 1965, which featured two of Willis' compositions. His first recording of any type, however, was as a singer with the Music and Arts Chorale Ensemble, performing an opera by Aaron Copland under the direction of Leonard Bernstein. He decided to concentrate on jazz because of the difficulties African-American musicians had in finding work in concert music.

Throughout his career he performed with a wide range of musicians, including several years as keyboardist for Blood, Sweat & Tears (beginning in 1972). He spent several years as pianist for trumpeters Nat Adderley and Woody Shaw as well as long and productive tenures with Roy Hargrove and with Jerry Gonzalez and his Fort Apache Band. His late recording with Paul Murphy, Exposé, demonstrated the fusion principles of bebop and avant-garde jazz. His composition "Sanctuary" began exploring works employing strings. After a successful performance in Frank Lloyd Wright's Annie Pfieffer Chapel at Florida Southern College's Child of the Sun Jazz Festival he was commissioned to write a full-scale orchestral work for jazz trio and orchestra. He worked with Hugh Masekela on a South African Suite of music and interpreted Miles Davis' work. He was in the Round About Midnight tour of Miles Davis' music. He received the Don Redman award in 2011, and the Benny Golson Jazz Master Award at Howard University in 2012.

He died of an aneurysm in Baltimore at the age of 76.

== Discography ==
=== As leader/co-leader ===
- A New Kind of Soul (LLP, 1970)
- Inner Crisis (Groove Merchant, 1973)
- My Funny Valentine (Jazz City, 1988)
- Just in Time (SteepleChase, 1989)
- Heavy Blue (SteepleChase, 1990)
- Let's Play (SteepleChase, 1991)
- Steal Away (AudioQuest, 1991 1992)
- Solo Spirit (Mapleshade, 1992, [1993])
- How Do You Keep the Music Playing? (SteepleChase, 1992)
- Unforgettable: Piano Solos, (SteepleChase, 1992)
- A Tribute to Someone (AudioQuest, 1993 [1994])
- Serenade (Sound Hills, 1995)
- If Trees Could Talk (Mapleshade, 1999) with Hamiet Bluiett
- Sunshower (Mapleshade, 2001) with Kash Killion, Steve Novosel, Paul Murphy, Steve Berrios
- Sanctuary (Mapleshade, 2003) with Joe Ford, Ray Codrington, Steve Novosel, Steve Berrios, Artie Sherman and the Rick Schmidt Strings
- The Powers of Two (Mapleshade, 2004) with Paul Murphy
- Alter Ego (Mapleshade, 2006) with Tony Pancella
- The Big Push (HighNote, 2006)
- Blue Fable (HighNote, 2007)
- The Offering (HighNote, 2008)
- This Time the Dream's on Me (HighNote, 2012)
- I Fall In Love Too Easily (HighNote, 2020)

=== As a member ===
Blood, Sweat & Tears

- New Blood (Columbia, 1972)
- No Sweat (Columbia, 1973)
- Mirror Image (Columbia, 1974)
- New City (Columbia, 1975)
- In Concert (Columbia, 1976)
- More Than Ever (Columbia, 1976)
- Brand New Day (ABC Records, 1977)

Heads of State
With Buster Williams, Al Foster and Gary Bartz

- Search for Peace (Smoke Sessions, 2015)

=== As sideman ===
With Nat Adderley

- On the Move (Theresa, 1983)
- Blue Autumn (Theresa, 1983)

With Carla Bley

- Night-Glo (Watt/ECM, 1985)
- Sextet (Watt/ECM, 1987)

With Jerry Gonzalez and The Fort Apache Band

- Earth Dance (Sunnyside, 1993)
- Crossroads (Milestone, 1994)
- Pensativo (Milestone, 1995)
- Fire Dance (Milestone, 1996)

With Hugh Masekela

- Grrr (uncredited) (1966)
- Reconstruction (1970)
- Home Is Where the Music Is (1978)
- Main Event Live (1978)
- Almost Like Being in Jazz (2005)
- Friends (2012)

With Jackie McLean

- Right Now! (Blue Note, 1965)
- Jacknife (Blue Note, 1965)

With Paul Murphyothers

- The Powers of Two, Volume 2 (Mapleshade, 2006)
- Exposé (Murphy, 2008)
- Excursions (Murphy, 2008)
- Foundations (Murphy, 2009)

With others

- Gary Bartz, Episode One: Children of Harlem (Challenge, 1994)
- Cindy Blackman, Arcane (Muse, 1987)
- Roy Hargrove, Moment to Moment (Verve, 2000)
- Louis Hayes, Nightfall (SteepleChase, 1991)
- Jimmy Heath, Peer Pleasure (Landmark, 1987)
- Joe Henderson, Multiple (Milestone, 1973)
- Groove Holmes, American Pie (Groove Merchant, 1972)
- Clifford Jordan, The Mellow Side of Clifford Jordan (Mapleshade, 1997)
- Robin Kenyatta, Gypsy Man (Atlantic, 1973)
- Carmen McRae, Carmen Sings Monk (Novus, 1988)
- Lee Morgan, Infinity (Blue Note, 1965)
- Alphonse Mouzon, The Essence of Mystery (Blue Note, 1972)
- David "Fathead" Newman, Still Hard Times (Muse, 1982)
- Valery Ponomarev, Trip to Moscow (Reservoir, 1987)
- Woody Shaw, For Sure! (Columbia, 1979)
- Steve Swallow, Carla (Xtra Watt, 1987)
- Buddy Terry, Lean on Him (Mainstream, 1973)
- Norris Turney, Big, Sweet 'n Blue (Mapleshade, 1993)
- Fred Lipsius, Dreaming of Your Love (MJA,1995)
- C. I. Williams, When Alto Was King (Mapleshade, 1997)
