= 21st Century Texts =

Live album by Raphe Malik
- Released: 1992
- Recorded: June 12, 1991
- Venue: Akademie der Künste, Berlin
- Genre: Jazz
- Length: 73:59
- Label: FMP
- Producer: Jost Gebers

Raphe Malik chronology
21st Century Texts (1992)	Sirens Sweet & Slow (1994)

21st Century Texts is an album by American jazz trumpeter Raphe Malik, which was recorded live during the Workshop Freie Musik at The Akademie der Künste in Berlin, and released on the German FMP label. Malik reformed his quintet in 1989 with his old partner Glenn Spearman on tenor, Brian King Nelson on C-melody sax, Larry Roland on bass and Dennis Warren on drums. The ensemble toured Europe in 1991 for a series of four concerts.

== Reception ==
Professional ratings
Review scores
Source	Rating
AllMusic	4.5/5 stars
The Penguin Guide to Jazz	3.5/4 stars

In his review for AllMusic, Michael G. Nastos states:

Malik's solid tone and fresh ideas have always indicated he's a musician to be watched and heard. This CD brings all his talent to the surface, with a band that can match those common goals. Highly recommended.

— Nastos, Michael G.. Raphe Malik – 21st Century Texts: Review at AllMusic. Retrieved August 7, 2017.

The Penguin Guide to Jazz notes:

Nelson's C-melody sax has a strikingly unfamiliar tonality but, with no piano or guitar as a reference point, it's able to find its own territory, often coming in under Malik in a series of call-and-response passages that are both alien and highly traditional.

— Cook, Richard; Brian Morton (2004). The Penguin Guide to Jazz on CD. The Penguin Guide to Jazz (7th ed.). London: Penguin. pp. 1028. ISBN 978-0141014166.

== Track listing ==
All compositions by Raphe Malik

1. "AB dedicated to A.B. Spellman" – 15:26
2. "CC dedicated to Duke Ellinton" – 6:50
3. "Blue 2 dedicated to Miles Davis" – 5:37
4. "Talk dedicated to Miles Davis" – 14:51
5. "Companions Too dedicated to Jimmy Lyons" – 9:06
6. "T's Quiet Time dedicated to Thelonious Monk" – 8:07
7. "Extensions" – 14:02

== Personnel ==
- Raphe Malik – trumpet
- Brian King Nelson – C-melody sax
- Glenn Spearman – tenor sax
- Larry Roland – bass
- Dennis Warren – drums
