= Let's Play (album) =

Studio album by Larry Willis Trio
- Released: 1991
- Recorded: January 1991
- Studio: Steeplechase Digital Studio
- Genre: Jazz
- Length: 66:52
- Label: SteepleChase; SCCD 31283
- Producer: Nils Winther

Larry Willis chronology
Heavy Blue (1990)	Let's Play (1991)	How Do You Keep the Music Playing? (1992)

Professional ratings
Review scores
Source	Rating
The Penguin Guide to Jazz Recordings	3/4 stars

Let's Play is an album by American jazz pianist Larry Willis recorded in 1991 and released on the SteepleChase label.

== Track listing ==
All compositions by Larry Willis except where noted

1. "I Hear a Rhapsody" (George Fragos, Jack Baker, Dick Gasparre) – 9:05
2. "Who Can I Turn To?" (Anthony Newley, Leslie Bricusse) – 6:45
3. "Let's Play" – 11:54
4. "No Blues" (Miles Davis) – 7:28
5. "Anne" (Santi Debriano) – 6:32
6. "The Children of Harlem" – 8:58
7. "Bess, You Is My Woman Now" (George Gershwin, Ira Gershwin) – 8:17
8. "Nardis" (Miles Davis) – 7:32

== Personnel ==
- Larry Willis – piano
- Santi Debriano – bass
- Victor Lewis – drums
