= Red Snapper: Paul Murphy at CBS =

Studio album by Paul Murphy
- Released: 2003
- Recorded: June 29, 1982
- Studio: New York City, New York, US
- Genre: Free jazz
- Label: Cadence; CJR 1167
- Producer: Bob Rusch

Paul Murphy chronology
Enarre (2002)	Red Snapper: Paul Murphy at CBS (2003)	Shadow Intersections West (2004)

Red Snapper: Paul Murphy at CBS is an album by drummer Paul Murphy. It was recorded in June 1982 in New York City, and was originally released privately with limited distribution before being reissued by Cadence Jazz Records in 2003. On the album, Murphy is joined by saxophonist Jimmy Lyons, trumpeter Dewey Johnson, bassoonist Karen Borca, and pianist Mary Anne Driscoll.

== Reception ==
Professional ratings
Review scores
Source	Rating
AllMusic	4.5/5 stars
The Penguin Guide to Jazz	2.5/4 stars

In a review for AllMusic, Steve Loewy wrote: "One look at the personnel and the importance of this recording is self-evident... the original album would be called "legendary" if it were better known... The album features stellar playing by the entire group... The short tracks make it more accessible... Taken as a whole, the music energizes, and even though it is all spontaneous, Murphy carefully steers it away from anything approaching chaos, with the focus on individual rather than group improvisation... Murphy, as leader, keeps it all paced, but he also often takes the lead with impressive spurts and occasionally longer solos. While not everyone plays on each track, each member of the quintet has time to burn, with Murphy and Lyons featured the most prominently."

The authors of The Penguin Guide to Jazz commented: "Borca is one of the strongest voices here, but it's Lyons who gets the most space in what is actually a series of duos and trios rather than any full performances by the quintet... the dialogue between Murphy and Lyons yield some powerful episodes."

Derek Taylor of One Final Note described the album as "an entertaining and edifying experience," and noted that Murphy's "rhythms are... pneumatic here, gusting and eddying in between his partners' lines, propelling the action while accentuating it at the same time."

JazzWord's Ken Waxman remarked: "Red Snapper is aimed at completists who can't get enough of Lyons — or Johnson — or the New Thing in Jazz that was being dismissed as old hat by 1982. Others will have to decide whether exceptional playing and good sentiments can overcome abbreviated running times and severed connections."

== Track listing ==
1. "Sailing Out" – 5:32
2. "Settin In" – 1:13
3. "The Scenery 1" – 4:00
4. "Wild Reed" – 3:25
5. "Steppin' Out 1" – 3:30
6. "The Scenery 2" – 3:13
7. "Reeding Room" – 1:47
8. "Steppin' Out 2" – 4:12
9. "The Scenery 3" – 4:35
10. "Steppin' Out 3" – 1:50
11. "Steepin' Up" – 4:47
12. "Mellow 1" – 3:12
13. "Mellow 2" – 3:54
14. "Innocent Incidents" – 1:55
15. "Duo 1" – 3:27
16. "Duo 2" – 4:15
17. "Duo 3" – 1:46
18. "Red Snapper, Pt. 1" – 2:11
19. "Red Snapper, Pt. 2" – 1:32

== Personnel ==
- Jimmy Lyons – alto saxophone
- Dewey Johnson – trumpet
- Karen Borca – bassoon
- Mary Anne Driscoll – piano, vocals
- Paul Murphy – percussion
