= Joel Futterman =

American jazz musician (born 1946)

Joel Futterman (born April 30, 1946 in Chicago) is an American jazz pianist and soprano saxophonist.

A native of Chicago, Joel Futterman was influenced both musically and philosophically by Gene Shaw, with whom he worked with and studied for a few years. Futterman was also influenced by Joseph Schwarzbaum, a writer, poet, and philosopher, as well as his brother Ronald. His influences include Thelonious Monk, John Coltrane, and Eric Dolphy.

From 1964 to 1969, Joel Futterman played bebop and other forms of jazz in various settings in Chicago. He played with artists affiliated with the AACM, but eventually left Chicago, moving to Virginia Beach in 1972. His first album, Cafeteria, was released in 1979. Since then, Futterman's recordings have included Jimmy Lyons, Richard Davis, and Hal Russell. In the 1980s he released several albums of material on his own label, JDF. After Lyons's death in 1986, Futterman quit working professionally for a time; some of their performances together were reissued in the 1990s.

Joel eventually returned to active performance. Some of his older material was reissued on Ear-Rational, Konnex Records, Bellaphon Records and Silkheart Records around this time. In 1994 Joel Futterman met Kidd Jordan, who introduced him to Alvin Fielder, and this trio has performed and recorded together for years. Also, Joel Futterman has performed with Greg Foster, Paul Murphy, Joseph Jarman, Jay Oliver, Ike Levin, and William Parker. Labels that have released his music include JDF, Silkheart, Charles Lester Music, and others.

Futterman is the author of three books.

== Discography ==
=== As leader ===
- Cafeteria (JDF 1979)
- The End Is The Beginning (JDF 1980)
- In-Between Positions (L&R, 1982)
- Moments (Ear Rational, 1983)
- Inneracion (Jdf, 1986) Record
- Inner Conversations (Ear Rational, 1988)
- Berlin Images (Silkheart, 1991)
- Naked Colours (Silkheart, 1991)
- Passage (Ear Rational, 1991)
- Silhouettes (Progressive, 1993)
- Vision in Time (Silkheart, 1994)
- Revelation (Kali, 1995)
- New Orleans Rising (Konnex, 1997))
- Southern Extreme (Drimala, 1997)
- Authenticity (Kali, 1998)
- Relativity (Kali, 1998)
- Alabama (Shipwreck, 2000)
- InterView (IML, 2000)
- The Present Gift (IML, 2001)
- Lifeline (IML, 2002)
- Dyami (Kali, 2003)
- Live at the Noe Valley Ministry (Orchard, 2003)
- Resolving Doors (Charles Lester, 2004)
- Coherence (Jdf, 2006)
- Enigma (Charles Lester, 2006)
- Live at the Blue Monk (Charles Lester, 2006)
- Possibilities (Ayler, 2006)
- Traveling Through Now (Charles Lester, 2008)
- Through the Mirror (CD Baby, 2014)
- Berlin Images Raphe Malik, Robert Adkins (1991)
- To the Edge Raphe Malik, Robert Adkins (1991)
- Love Remembered Kim Russell Siebert (1995)
- Nickelsdorf Konfrontation Kidd Jordan, Alvin Fielder, Mats Gustafson Barry Guy (1995)
- Intercoastal Blues Bruce Hyman (1998)
- Who Are You (1999)
- New Orleans Festival Suite Kidd Jordan, William Parker, Alvin Fielder (1999)
- Paul Murphy/ Quartet Paul Murphy, Vattel Cherry, Jimmy Williams (2000)
- As of Now Jimmy Williams (2000)
- Sweet Silence Kim Russell Siebert, Kidd Jordan (2000)
- Live at Tampere Kidd Jordan, Alvin Fielder (2000)
- Enarre Paul Murphy, Kash Killion (2002)
- Prayer for Peace Anthony Mirabile (2003)
- Athena Greg Foster (2007)
- Breakaway Paul Murphy, Jere Carroll (2007)
- Live in Baltimore Ike Levin (2007)
- Existence (2008)
- Blues Here and Now (2008)
- On the Blink of a Precipice Derwyn Holder (2008)
- Spectrum (2008)
- Transcending to Relaxation (2009)
- Journey in the Now (2009)
- Transition Volume 2 DVD (2009)
- Transition Volume 2 CD (2009)
- Transition Volume 1 DVD (2009)
- Transition Volume 1 CD (2009)
- Interaction Kidd Jordan (2009)
- Celebration Ike Levin (2009)
- Dialogues and Connections Ike Levin (2010)
- Albert's Bells (2010)
- Remembering Dolphy (2010)
- Perception (2011)
- The Fall (2011)
- Live at the Guelph Jazz Festival (2011) Kidd Jordan, William Parker, Alvin Fielder (2011)
- Blues for My Brother (2012)
- Interinfinity Alvin Fielder (2013)
- Reflection 1 Reflection 11 (2015)
- Pathways (2017) Joel Futterman
- Live In Chicago (2017) Joel Futterman Ike Levin
- Masters In Improvisation (2017) Kidd Jordan Joel Futterman Alvin Fielder Steve Swell
- Transformation (2018) Joel Futterman Avreeayl Ra
- Timeless Memories (2018) Joel Futterman Ike Levin Tim Duroche
- Intervals Joel Futterman (2019)
- Intervals 2 (2019) Joel Futterman
- Spirits (2020) Kidd Jordan Joel Futterman Alvin Fielder Recorded 1997 Released on Silkheart
- TRIBUTE TO ALVIN FIELDER VISION FESTIVAL XXlV (2020) KIDD JORDAN JOEL FUTTERMAN WILLIAM PARKER HAMID DRAKE
- IN-BETWEEN-POSITIONS (REISSUE 2020) JOEL FUTTERMAN JIMMY LYONS RICHARD DAVIS ROBERT ADKINS
- WHY? (JDF 2020)
- Timeless Moments (2021)
- CREATION SERIES 1, 2, 3, 4, 5 (2021) Joel Futterman
- Warp and Weft (2021) Joel Futterman Steve Hirsh
- The Chicago River Concerts (2022) Joel Futterman Hal Russell CD 1 CD 2 CD 3
- ebb & flow (2022) Joel Futterman Chad Fowler Steve Hirsh
- The Deep (2022) Joel Futterman William Parker Chad Fowler Steve Hirsh
- Inner Planet (2022) Joel Futterman
- Here and Now (2022) Joel Futterman
- INNERPAUSE (2023) Joel Futterman Michael Wimberly
- Infinite Dimensions (2023) Joel Futterman Ike Levin
- The Gathering (2023) Joel Futterman Ike Levin Steve Hirsh
- Forever (2023) Joel Futterman
- Perspicacity (Soul City Sounds, 2024) Joel Futterman

== Books ==
- Creative Patterns (JDF, 1973)
- The Design (JDF, 2010)
- The Question (JDF, 2015)
- "Creative Patterns" 2nd ED. 2020

== Official website ==
- Official site
