= Conquistador! =

Studio album by Cecil Taylor
- Released: March 1968
- Recorded: October 6, 1966
- Studio: Van Gelder Studio, Englewood Cliffs, New Jersey
- Genre: Free jazz
- Length: 37:14
- Label: Blue Note
- Producer: Alfred Lion

Cecil Taylor chronology
Unit Structures (1966)	Conquistador! (1968)	Student Studies (1966)

Professional ratings
Review scores
Source	Rating
All About Jazz	4/5 stars
AllMusic	4.5/5 stars
The Rolling Stone Jazz Record Guide	5/5 stars
The Penguin Guide to Jazz Recordings	4/4 stars

Conquistador! is a 1968 studio album recorded in 1966 by free jazz pianist Cecil Taylor, released by Blue Note Records.

== Critical reception ==
Writing for AllMusic, Scott Yanow gave the album 4.5 out of 5 stars, stating that "During the two lengthy pieces, [Jimmy] Lyons' passionate solos contrast with [Bill] Dixon's quieter ruminations while the music in general is unremittingly intense."

The authors of The Penguin Guide to Jazz awarded the album 4 stars, calling it "an all but flawless record," and commenting: "Dark, difficult, unique, yet operating at an artful tangent to some of the other 'difficult' Blue Note music of the period, this is Taylor at his most devious."

Writing for Vinyl Me Please, Brian Josephs stated: "Conquistador!... swerves away from Unit Structures' fire and evokes the coolness of its cover, which features a turtlenecked Taylor slightly out of focus, hiding behind shades as he mysteriously stares into the distance. The musical elements don’t combust as much as they melt into each other: Horns swell shrilly at the borders to add haunted textures, while Andrew Cyrille's amorphous rhythms tie the masterwork together. Even without Unit Structures as its contrast, Conquistador! still stands as a great testament to this sui generis collective."

In 2008, The New Yorker placed it at number 87 on the "100 Essential Jazz Albums" list.

== Track listing ==
All tracks are written by Cecil Taylor.

No.	Title	Length
1.	"Conquistador"	17:54
2.	"With (Exit)"	19:20
3.	"With (Exit) [Alternate Take]" (CD edition bonus track)	17:24

== Personnel ==
Credits adapted from liner notes.

- Cecil Taylor – piano
- Bill Dixon – trumpet
- Jimmy Lyons – alto saxophone
- Henry Grimes – double bass
- Alan Silva – double bass
- Andrew Cyrille – drums
