= Just in Time (album) =

Studio album by Larry Willis Trio
- Released: 1989
- Recorded: July 7, 1989
- Genre: Jazz
- Length: 68:22 CD release with additional tracks
- Label: SteepleChase; SCS 1251/SCCD 31251
- Producer: Nils Winther

Larry Willis chronology
| My Funny Valentine (1978) | Just in Time (1989) | Heavy Blue (1990) |

Just in Time is an album by American jazz pianist Larry Willis recorded in 1989 and released on the SteepleChase label.

== Reception ==
Professional ratings
Review scores
| Source | Rating |
|---|---|
| AllMusic | 4.5/5 stars |
| The Penguin Guide to Jazz Recordings | 3/4 stars |

AllMusic's Michael G. Nastos said: "Here is trio jazz from a veteran pianist, one of the best in America".

== Track listing ==
All compositions by Larry Willis except where noted

1. "Just in Time" (Jule Styne, Betty Comden, Adolph Green) – 10:32
2. "Soul Search" – 8:59
3. "T's Bag Blues" – 5:20
4. "For All We Know" (J. Fred Coots, Sam M. Lewis) – 9:39 Additional track on CD release
5. "Solar" (Miles Davis) – 6:31 Additional track on CD release
6. "Te Quiero Mi Hermand" – 10:01
7. "The Island" (Ivan Lins, Vítor Martins) – 8:21
8. "One Finger Snap" (Herbie Hancock) – 8:59

== Personnel ==
- Larry Willis – piano
- Bob Cranshaw – bass
- Kenny Washington – drums
