= Speak Easy =

Studio album by Raphe Malik
- Released: 2001
- Recorded: 2000
- Studio: Toronto, Ontario, Canada
- Genre: Free jazz
- Length: 46:55
- Label: Le Systeme; LS004
- Producer: James Duncan

Raphe Malik chronology
Looking East: A Suite in Three Parts (2001)	Speak Easy (2001)	Companions (2002)

Speak Easy is a solo trumpet album by Raphe Malik. It was recorded in Toronto, Ontario, Canada, during the spring of 2000, and was released in 2001 by the Canadian label Le Systeme.

== Reception ==
Professional ratings
Review scores
Source	Rating
AllMusic	2.5/5 stars
The Penguin Guide to Jazz	3/4 stars

In a review for AllMusic, François Couture wrote: "Solo trumpet albums are not common and thus lovers and students of the instrument will be attracted to this release, especially since it is generally friendlier (because jazzier) than similar opuses by Wadada Leo Smith and Bill Dixon." However, he noted "annoying" and "inexcusable" issues with the recording quality.

The authors of The Penguin Guide to Jazz Recordings called the album "a rare and welcome chance" to hear the trumpeter in a solo context, and commented: "Malik avoids mere technical display. There are blues-based compositions, boppish heads and the occasional completely free-form idea." They praised "Odds Out" and "Cruise Control" as "stand-out tracks."

A reviewer for All About Jazz stated: "For listeners curious about Malik in his undiluted form, this is a wonderful introduction. And anyone who's willing to involve themselves in the music will find the entire disc mesmerizing. But don't even think about using this as background music (or incendiary material), because that's not what it's all about."

== Track listing ==
All compositions by Raphe Malik.

1. "Avenue D" – 5:06
2. "Bell" – 5:55
3. "Odds Out" – 6:43
4. "Good Graces" – 3:35
5. "Cruise Control" – 6:36
6. "Abstract" – 3:54
7. "Float School" – 2:22
8. "Mystery of Human" – 4:00
9. "Tone Row" – 3:22
10. "Untitled" – 5:22

== Personnel ==
- Raphe Malik – trumpet
