= Jimmy Lyons (saxophonist) =

American alto saxophone player

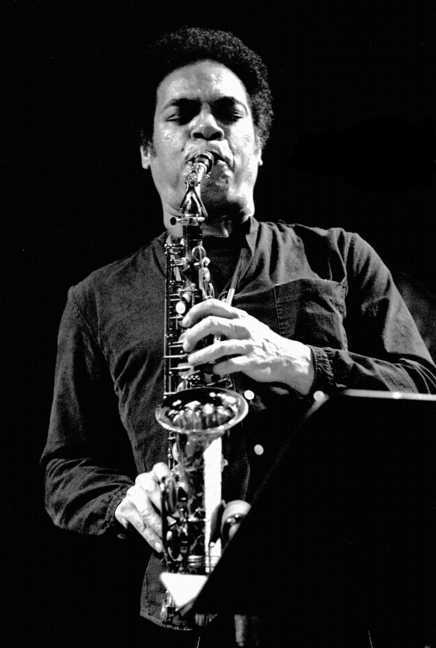
- Lyons in 1978

Background information
- Born: James Lyons; December 1, 1931; Jersey City, New Jersey, US
- Died: May 19, 1986 (aged 54)
- Genres: Jazz, free jazz, avant-garde jazz
- Occupation: Musician
- Instrument: Alto saxophone
- Label: Black Saint/Soul Note

Jimmy Lyons (December 1, 1931 – May 19, 1986) was an American alto saxophone player. He is best known for his long tenure in the Cecil Taylor Unit. Lyons was the only constant member of the band from the mid-1960s until his death. Taylor never worked with another musician as frequently as he did with Lyons. Lyons' playing, influenced by Charlie Parker, kept Taylor's avant-garde music tethered to the jazz tradition.

== Biography ==
Lyons was born in Jersey City, New Jersey, United States, and raised there until the age of nine, when his mother moved the family to Harlem and then the Bronx. He obtained his first saxophone in the mid-1940s and took lessons from Buster Bailey.

After high school, Lyons was drafted into the United States Army and spent 21 months on infantry duty in Korea. He then spent a year playing in army bands. Once discharged he attended New York University. By the end of the 1950s, Lyons was supporting his interest in music by working for the United States Postal Service.

In 1960, Lyons followed Archie Shepp into the saxophone role in the Cecil Taylor Unit. His post-Parker sound and strong melodic sense became a defining part of the sound of that group, from the 1962 Cafe Montmartre sessions onwards.

During the 1970s, Lyons also ran his own ensemble, with bassoonist Karen Borca and percussionist Paul Murphy. They often performed in the loft jazz movement around Studio Rivbea. Lyons' group and Cecil Taylor Unit continued a parallel development throughout the 1970s and 1980s, often involving the same musicians, including trumpeter Raphe Malik, bassist William Parker and percussionist Murphy.

In 1976, Lyons performed in a production of Adrienne Kennedy's A Rat's Mass directed by Cecil Taylor at La MaMa Experimental Theatre Club in the East Village of Manhattan. Musicians Rashid Bakr, Andy Bey, Karen Borca, David S. Ware, and Raphe Malik also performed in the production. Taylor's production combined the original script with a chorus of orchestrated voices used as instruments.

Lyons died from lung cancer in 1986 at the age of 54. He did not publish many recordings with his own ensemble, though Ayler Records did release a five-CD box set of recordings from 1972 to 1985.

== Discography ==
=== As leader ===
- 1969: Other Afternoons with Lester Bowie, Andrew Cyrille, Alan Silva (BYG Records, 1970)
- 1978: Push Pull (Hathut Records, 1979) – live
- 1980: Riffs with Karen Borca, Jay Oliver, Paul Murphy (hat MUSICS, 1982) – live
- 1980: Jump Up / What to Do About with John Lindberg, Sunny Murray (Hathut Records, 1981) – live
- 1981: Something in Return with Andrew Cyrille (Black Saint Records, 1988) – live
- 1982: Burnt Offering with Andrew Cyrille (Black Saint Records, 1982) – live
- 1983: Wee Sneezawee with Karen Borca, Raphe Malik, Paul Murphy, William Parker (Black Saint Records, 1983)
- 1985: Give It Up with Karen Borca, Paul Murphy, Jay Oliver, Enrico Rava (Black Saint Records, 1985)

Compilations

- The Box Set (Ayler Records, 2003)[5CD] – previously unreleased live tracks, limited edition
- The Complete Remastered Recordings on Black Saint & Soul Note (Black Saint Records, 2014)[5CD]

=== As sideman ===
With Cecil Taylor

- Nefertiti, the Beautiful One Has Come (Revenant, 1963) – live
- Unit Structures (Blue Note, 1966)
- Conquistador! (Blue Note, 1968) – recorded in 1966
- Student Studies (BYG, 1973) – live recorded in 1966
- Akisakila (Trio, 1973) – live
- Spring of Two Blue J's (Unit Core, 1974) – live recorded in 1973
- Dark to Themselves (Inner City/Enja, 1977) – live recorded in 1976
- The Great Concert of Cecil Taylor (Prestige, 1977) – live recorded in 1969
- Cecil Taylor Unit (New World, 1978)
- 3 Phasis (New World, 1978)
- Live in the Black Forest (MPS, 1978)
- One Too Many Salty Swift and Not Goodbye (Hat Hut, 1980)
- It Is in the Brewing Luminous (Hat Hut, 1981)
- The Eighth (Hat Hut, 1986)
- Winged Serpent (Soul Note, 1985)
- Mixed (Impulse!, 1998)
- The Complete, Legendary, Live Return Concert (Oblivion, 2022)

With Jazz Composer's Orchestra

- Communication (JCOA, 1965) – live
- Escalator over the Hill (JCOA, 1971) – recorded in 1968-71

With Joel Futterman

- In-Between Position(s) (L+R, 1982)
- Moments (Ear Rational, 1983)
- Inneraction (JDF Music, 1984)
- Inner Conversations (Ear-Rational, 1988)
- Passage (Ear-Rational, 1991)

With Paul Murphy

- Cloudburst: Paul Murphy at RCA (Murphy, 1983)
- Red Snapper: Paul Murphy at CBS (CIMP, 2003) – recorded in 1982

With others

- Andrew Cyrille, Nuba (Black Saint, 1979)
- Eddie Gale, Black Rhythm Happening (Blue Note, 1969)
- Gil Evans, Into the Hot (Impulse!, 1962) – recorded in 1961
