= Something in Return =

Live album by Jimmy Lyons and Andrew Cyrille
- Released: 1988
- Recorded: February 13, 1981
- Venue: Soundscape, New York City, New York, US
- Genre: Jazz
- Length: 1:00:01
- Label: Black Saint
- Producer: Giovanni Bonandrini

Jimmy Lyons chronology
Jump Up / What to Do About (1980)	Something in Return (1988)	Burnt Offering (1991)

Andrew Cyrille chronology
Andrew Cyrille Meets Brötzmann in Berlin (1983)	Something in Return (1988)	Irène Schweizer & Andrew Cyrille (1989)

Something in Return is an album by American jazz saxophonist Jimmy Lyons and American jazz drummer Andrew Cyrille. It was recorded in February 1981 at Soundscape, New York City, and released by the Black Saint label in 1988.

== Reception ==
Professional ratings
Review scores
Source	Rating
AllMusic	3/5 stars
The Penguin Guide to Jazz	3.5/4 stars
Tom Hull – on the Web	A−
The Rolling Stone Jazz & Blues Album Guide	4/5 stars

The AllMusic review awarded the album 3 stars.

The authors of The Penguin Guide to Jazz awarded the album 3½ stars, and wrote: "Among the most fruitful encounters of Lyons's sadly under-documented career were his duos with Cyrille, a fellow-alumnus of Cecil Taylor Academy. Cyrille is a one-man orchestra, conjuring layered energies that make a sax-and-drums 'Take the A Train' seem anything but absurd... superb examples of two masters in flight."

Doug Simpson, writing for Audiophile Audition, called the opening track "a challenging exercise in extemporization, imagination and instrumental expertise. Cyrille's rolling percussion is heavy, heady and holistic and benefits from close microphone placement. Every brushstroke or cymbal touch has gravitas. Lyons does not abandon Ellington's conspicuous chorus, but gives it a fresh twist or two." He concluded: "This isn't effortless music to grasp but the overall aggression is something to behold... At times, the music is like an onslaught but the music breathes as well..."

== Track listing ==
1. "Take the 'A' Train" (Billy Strayhorn) - 8:21
2. "Something in Return" (Cyrille) - 14:25
3. "Lorry" (Lyons) - 6:19
4. "J.L." (Lyons) - 5:10
5. "Nuba" (Cyrille) - 9:46
6. Fragments I (Cyrille / Lyons) - 15:41
- Recorded at Soundscape, New York, NY on February 13, 1981.

== Personnel ==
- Jimmy Lyons - alto saxophone
- Andrew Cyrille - percussion
