= Student Studies =

Live album by Cecil Taylor
- Released: 1973
- Recorded: November 30, 1966
- Genre: Free jazz
- Length: 56:27
- Label: BYG; Black Lion Records

Cecil Taylor chronology
Conquistador! (1966)	Student Studies (1973)	The Jazz Composer's Orchestra (1968)

Student Studies is a live album by Cecil Taylor recorded in November 1966 and released on the Japanese BYG label as an untitled 2-LP set in 1973. It features a performance by Taylor with Jimmy Lyons, Alan Silva and Andrew Cyrille. The album was first released on CD by the Affinity label as Student Studies, later rereleased on the Black Lion label as The Great Paris Concert, and then reissued a third time as Student Studies by Fuel 2000. None of the three CD issues use the original LP cover artwork.

== Reception ==
Professional ratings
Review scores
Source	Rating
AllMusic #1	4.5/5 stars
AllMusic #2	4/5 stars

In a review for AllMusic, Thom Jurek wrote: "Student Studies is an anomaly from his other recordings of the era. Not purely improvised, Taylor uses arranged sections and built-in segments for thematic and improvisational space. His meditations on short tonal studies and propulsive bursts of energy became signifiers of his later music... This is the sound of an artist at a creative peak of his improvisational and authoritative power to lead a band through the maze of sonic architecture and come out with something that was truly new and different." In a second AllMusic review, Scott Yanow commented: "By the time of his Paris concert, Cecil Taylor's quartet had reached a particularly high level of musical communication. Not only did altoist Jimmy Lyons... find a place for himself in the dense ensembles, but one can hear him and the pianist/leader echoing each other's phrases in spots. The greatly underrated Alan Silva... was one of Taylor's strongest bassists... the flexible drummer Andrew Cyrille 'battles' Taylor quite successfully. Most surprising is the use of space during the first part of 'Student Studies' and the various sounds utilized on 'Amplitude,' predating the innovations of the Art Ensemble of Chicago. A very interesting set, recommended for the open-eared."

Writing for Vinyl Me Please, Brian Josephs stated: "Student Studies is another example of how well of a match Taylor found in alto saxophonist Jimmy Lyons and drummer Andrew Cyrille, who backed both of those prior efforts. It's not just that they’re both exceptional musicians — they both adroitly engage with even Taylor's wildest piano blitzes. Lyons' sax rises to evoke whatever tension is left in the space between Taylor's notes, and Cyrille's frenetic rhythms sinew the eccentrics." Henry Kuntz, in an article for the Bells Free Jazz Journal, wrote: "It is the movement of the sound and the inter-relationship between tones and between instruments – the setting up of multiple rhythmic/harmonic advances and suspensions – that carries the force and weight of these creative efforts. There is an astonishing group interplay to which Silva’s bass lends an even greater depth and fluidity. In a certain sense, these pieces are less linearly conceived than most Taylor compositions: they utilize space more and are somewhat more 'expansive' in their overall musical design."

== Track listing ==
All compositions by Cecil Taylor.

1. "Student Studies, Part 1" - 15:58
2. "Student Studies, Part 2" - 10:58
3. "Amplitude" - 19:41
4. "Niggle Feuigle" - 12:07

- Recorded in Paris on November 30, 1966

== Personnel ==
- Cecil Taylor: piano
- Jimmy Lyons: alto saxophone
- Alan Silva: bass
- Andrew Cyrille: drums
