= Sympathy (Raphe Malik album) =

Studio album by Raphe Malik
- Released: 2004
- Recorded: October 3, 2002
- Studio: Northern Track Recording, Wilmington, Vermont
- Genre: Jazz
- Length: 75:27
- Label: Boxholder
- Producer: Raphe Malik

Raphe Malik chronology
Companions (2002)	Sympathy (2004)	Last Set: Live at the 1369 Jazz Club (2004)

Sympathy is an album by American jazz trumpeter Raphe Malik featuring a trio with multi-instrumentalist Joe McPhee and drummer Donald Robinson, which was recorded in 2002 and released on the Boxholder label.

== Reception ==
Professional ratings
Review scores
Source	Rating
AllMusic	4/5 stars
The Penguin Guide to Jazz	4/4 stars

In his review for AllMusic, Steve Loewy states "Although this album may not be the best introduction to the horn players, as both Malik and McPhee have recorded in larger, broader settings offering greater challenges, it fits a niche for dedicated connoisseurs of free improvisation, with expansive opportunities for lengthy improvisations."

The Penguin Guide to Jazz says "A wildly exciting improv set that needs a pause between tracks, just to absorb the amount of musical information these guys put out."

The All About Jazz review by Clifford Allen notes "Hearing Malik next to McPhee, it is clear that the former is far less of a smearer than the latter, even in a setting where blurred multiphonics are the starting point for an improvisation. The stylistic differences between the two players make for very interesting listening."

In his review for JazzTimes Chris Kelsey says "Malik and McPhee sometimes seem like they're in a contest to see who can play the fewest notes. Occasionally it sounds desultory, but at its best, as on the soprano-trumpet duet 'Motivic,' their quiet, melodic interplay is lovely to behold."

== Track listing ==
All compositions by Raphe Malik

1. "Testament" – 9:12
2. "Resolving a Quote" – 7:41
3. "Velocity" – 4:51
4. "Space March" – 7:31
5. "Hypersonic" – 10:01
6. "Motivic" – 9:17
7. "Untitled Dialogue" – 6:41
8. "Call and Response" – 8:19
9. "Escape Route" – 12:35

== Personnel ==
- Raphe Malik – b-flat trumpet, c trumpet
- Joe McPhee – soprano sax, pocket trumpet
- Donald Robinson - drums
