= Blue Fable =

Studio album by Larry Willis
- Released: January 30, 2007
- Recorded: October 2, 2006
- Studio: Van Gelder Studio, Englewood Cliffs, NJ
- Genre: Jazz
- Length: 54:28
- Label: HighNote; HCD 7163
- Producer: Don Sickler

Larry Willis chronology
The Big Push (2006)	Blue Fable (2007)	The Offering (2008)

Blue Fable is an album by pianist Larry Willis which was recorded in 2006 and released on the Highnote label early the following year.

== Reception ==
Professional ratings
Review scores
Source	Rating
Allmusic	4/5 stars
The Penguin Guide to Jazz Recordings	3.5/4 stars

Allmusic's Ken Dryden reviewed the album stating "Larry Willis' second CD for HighNote is a provocative affair, alternating between a trio and quintet as the pianist takes a fresh look at well-known pieces, along with more recent compositions by participants on the date. ... Highly recommended". All About Jazz' Donald Elfman observed "it sounds like a smart jazz group having fun. The horn players — alto saxophonist Joe Ford and trombonist Steve Davis — are longtime associates of Willis' and play with funk and sass but never as showboaters, listening carefully and beautifully complementing the sterling trio (bassist Eddie Gomez and drummer Billy Drummond) on four of the tunes here as well as each contributing a composition. And a sterling trio it is. They can find the sweetness in a ballad — Willis has always made it a point of learning lyrics and Drummond and Gomez must do the same — and then a minute later, knock your socks off with something up-tempo". JazzTimes' Mike Joyce noted "It’s easy to take Larry Willis’ gifts for granted, since the veteran pianist who has contributed to countless studio sessions over the years always seems to elevate the level of play. But Blue Fable opens with such a delightful jolt that even longtime listeners will sit up and take notice".

== Track listing ==
All compositions by Larry Willis except where noted

1. "Rhythm-a-Ning" (Thelonious Monk) – 6:30
2. "Insidious Behavior" – 4:56
3. "Nardis" (Miles Davis) – 7:09
4. "Blue Fable" (Jackie McLean) – 5:42
5. "Never Let Me Go" (Jay Livingston, Ray Evans) – 7:23
6. "Landscape" (Joe Ford) – 5:22
7. "Who's Kidding Who" – 8:09
8. "Prayer for New Orleans" (Steve Davis) – 9:17

== Personnel ==
- Larry Willis – piano
- Joe Ford – alto saxophone (tracks 2, 4, 6 & 8)
- Steve Davis – trombone (tracks 2, 4, 6 & 8)
- Eddie Gómez – bass
- Billy Drummond – drums

=== Production ===
- Don Sickler - producer
- Rudy Van Gelder - engineer
