= Storyline (Raphe Malik album) =

Studio album by Raphe Malik
- Released: 2000
- Recorded: September 10, 1999
- Studio: Northern Track Recording, Wilmington, Vermont
- Genre: Jazz
- Length: 59:42
- Label: Boxholder
- Producer: Raphe Malik

Raphe Malik chronology
ConSequences (1999)	Storyline (2000)	Looking East: A Suite in Three Parts (2001)

Storyline is an album by American jazz trumpeter Raphe Malik featuring a trio with bassist Cecil McBee and drummer Codaryl "Cody" Moffett, which was recorded in 1999 and released on the Boxholder label.

== Reception ==
Professional ratings
Review scores
Source	Rating
AllMusic	4/5 stars
The Penguin Guide to Jazz	3.5/4 stars

In his review for AllMusic, Thom Jurek states: "This is as fine a trumpet disc as one is likely to find amid the current crop, and an auspicious coming together of three fine soloists for the purpose of exploring the darker, richer, and more purple edges of the blues."

The Penguin Guide to Jazz notes that "Malik demonstrates his deep familiarity with blues and jazz traditions on 'Minimal Blue', which uses a basic 12-bar to generate a complex group improvisation. Other tunes, like 'First Valve Blues' and 'The Hard Way', follow a similar procedure with equal effect, but there is a law of diminishing returns on this fine record and it is probably best sampled a track or two at a time."

The All About Jazz review by Robert Spencer wrote that Malik "is a superb, incendiary performer who should be more widely heard. Let's hope this extraordinary disc will win him some of that recognition."

In his review for JazzTimes, Christopher Porter describes the album as "a genuinely powerful record that reaches out to the far side of improvised music without getting lost there."

== Track listing ==
All compositions by Raphe Malik

1. "Incalculable" – 5:45
2. "Minimal Blue" – 6:05
3. "Ago (Go)" – 6:07
4. "Why Not?" – 6:13
5. "Nucleus" – 5:21
6. "First Valve Blues" – 3:54
7. "Ago (Go) Alternate Take" – 7:16
8. "The Hard Way" – 7:07
9. "Era" – 5:35
10. "In the Genes" – 6:19

== Personnel ==
- Raphe Malik – trumpet
- Cecil McBee – bass
- Codaryl "Cody" Moffett - drums
