= How Do You Keep the Music Playing? (Larry Willis album) =

Studio album by Larry Willis
- Released: 1992
- Recorded: April 27, 1992
- Studio: SteepleChase Digital Studio
- Genre: Jazz
- Length: 63:21
- Label: SteepleChase; SCCD 31312
- Producer: Nils Winther

Larry Willis chronology
| Let's Play (1991) | How Do You Keep the Music Playing? (1992) | Unforgettable: Piano Solos (1992) |

Professional ratings
Review scores
| Source | Rating |
|---|---|
| The Penguin Guide to Jazz Recordings | 3.5/4 stars |

How Do You Keep the Music Playing? is an album by American jazz pianist Larry Willis recorded in 1992 and released on the SteepleChase label.

== Track listing ==
All compositions by Larry Willis except where noted

1. "Gloria's Step" (Scott LaFaro) – 5:01
2. "How Do You Keep the Music Playing?" (Michel Legrand, Alan Bergman, Marilyn Bergman) – 7:31
3. "All of You" (Cole Porter) – 6:21
4. "North West" (Jeff Williams) – 7:31
5. "Slick Rick" – 7:46
6. "Missing You" – 7:27
7. "Ezekiel Saw the Wheel" (Traditional) – 5:22
8. "Dance Cadaverous" (Wayne Shorter) – 7:21
9. "Alone Together" (Arthur Schwartz, Howard Dietz) – 8:37

== Personnel ==
- Larry Willis – piano
- David Williams – bass
- Lewis Nash – drums
