= Irène Schweizer & Andrew Cyrille =

Live album by Irène Schweizer and Andrew Cyrille
- Released: 1989
- Recorded: September 3, 1988
- Venue: Jazz Festival Willisau
- Genre: Jazz
- Length: 44:43
- Label: Intakt Records; 008

Irène Schweizer chronology
Irène Schweizer & Günter Sommer (1988)	Irène Schweizer & Andrew Cyrille (1989)	Seite A Seite (1989)

Andrew Cyrille chronology
Something in Return (1988)	Irène Schweizer & Andrew Cyrille (1989)	Burnt Offering (1991)

Irène Schweizer & Andrew Cyrille is a live album by pianist Irène Schweizer and drummer Andrew Cyrille. It was recorded in September 1988 at the Jazz Festival Willisau, and was released by Intakt Records on LP in 1989, and on CD in 1996.

According to Schweizer, she first met Cyrille when he attended one of her concerts in Stäfa, Switzerland. She invited him to join a jam session, and the two later played a duo that she described as "an unforgettable experience." The title of the track "From Stäfa to Willisau via Music" refers to their music relationship.

Regarding Cyrille's musical background, Schweizer recalled: "I followed the collaboration between Cecil Taylor and Andrew Cyrille during the 60s with great interest. I was inspired. Cecil's way of playing, his clusters, strongly influenced me at that time. Andrew is an unusually fast and agile drummer. He plays free, but he's also an exceptional time player. He listens very acutely. His long collaboration with Cecil Taylor was the best schooling for listening to the piano."

== Reception ==
Professional ratings
Review scores
Source	Rating
AllMusic	4.5/5 stars
The Penguin Guide to Jazz	3.5/4 stars
Tom Hull – on the Web	A−
The Virgin Encyclopedia of Jazz	3/5 stars

In a review for AllMusic, Thom Jurek wrote: "What is most remarkable about this session is how immediately the rapport between the pair is established. Schweizer goes after a rhythmic angular line, chopping it up into small staccato phrases, and Cyrille, using the entire wealth of his drum kit and gongs, feeds back her pulses as either specific accented answers or contrapuntal inversions that she takes enough delight in to lengthen her statements. There is no stalling between these two, no looking around for a language, it's all one syllable: "GO!"... There are few expressions of spontaneous communication in improvisational music that could equal, let alone surpass, this one."

The authors of the Penguin Guide to Jazz Recordings awarded the album 3½ stars, but noted: "One senses that Schweizer is very aware of the Taylor lineage and deliberately tries to steer away from it, though the clusters and clumped runs she falls into are immediately and inescapably redolent of the American pianist."

== Track listing ==
1. "Smashing Napf" (Schweizer) - 6:50
2. "Soft Inside" (Schweizer) - 3:05
3. "From Stäfa to Willisau via Music" (Cyrille, Schweizer) - 12:40
4. "As Time Goes On" (Schweizer) - 3:50
5. "Fiction of the 13th Kind" (Cyrille) - 12:35
6. "A Monkish Encore" (Cyrille, Schweizer) - 4:15
- Recorded live at the Jazz Festival Willisau on September 3, 1988.

== Personnel ==
- Irène Schweizer – piano
- Andrew Cyrille – drums

== Production ==
- Peter Pfister – engineer
