= Heavy Blue =

Studio album by Larry Willis Quintet
- Released: 1990
- Recorded: December 1989
- Genre: Jazz
- Length: 61:09
- Label: SteepleChase; SCS 1269/SCCD 31269
- Producer: Nils Winther

Larry Willis chronology
| Just in Time (1989) | Heavy Blue (1990) | Let's Play (1991) |

Professional ratings
Review scores
| Source | Rating |
|---|---|
| The Penguin Guide to Jazz Recordings | 3/4 stars |

Heavy Blue is an album by American jazz pianist Larry Willis recorded in 1989 and released on the SteepleChase label.

== Track listing ==
All compositions by Larry Willis except where noted

1. "To Wisdom, The Prize" – 8:17
2. "Winther Blue" – 6:33
3. "Earthlings" (Joe Ford) – 6:32
4. "When I Fall in Love" (Victor Young, Edward Heyman) – 8:37
5. "Nightfall" – 10:07
6. "Heavy Blue" – 6:26
7. "Ballad for Frederick" – 7:17
8. "Habiba" (Kirk Lightsey) – 7:15

== Personnel ==
- Larry Willis – piano
- Jerry González – trumpet, flugelhorn
- Joe Ford – tenor saxophone, alto saxophone, soprano saxophone
- Don Pate – bass
- Jeff "Tain" Watts – drums
