= A New Kind of Soul =

Studio album by Larry Willis
- Released: 1970
- Recorded: 1970
- Studio: Bell Studios, NY
- Genre: Jazz
- Label: LLP; LLP 1001
- Producer: Lenny Lewis

Larry Willis chronology
A New Kind of Soul (1970)	Inner Crisis (1973)

A New Kind of Soul is the debut album by American jazz pianist Larry Willis recorded in 1970 and originally released on the LLP label before being reissued US on Brunswick Records in 1972.

== Reception ==
Professional ratings
Review scores
Source	Rating
Allmusic	4/5 stars

Allmusic's Michael G. Nastos said: "More funky. With viable jazz horn sound for support. Easy to like".

== Track listing ==
1. "Lickin' Stick" (Alfred Ellis, Bobby Byrd, James Brown) – 3:12
2. "Someday Soon" (Larry Willis) – 4:47
3. "Funky Judge" (Andre Williams, Leo Hutton) – 4:25
4. "Mayibuye" (Christopher Songxaka, Miriam Makeba) – 3:20
5. "Consola Coa" (Baden Powell) – 5:37
6. "Walking Backward Down the Road" (Burt Bacharach, Hal David) – 4:59
7. "Holiday in Barbados" (Willis) – 2:57
8. "Hard to Handle" (Otis Redding) – 2:54

== Personnel ==
- Larry Willis – piano, arranger
- Jimmy Owens, Joe Newman, Marvin Stamm – flugelhorn
- Al Gafa – guitar, electric guitar
- George Mraz – bass
- Al Foster – drums
