= ConSequences (Raphe Malik album) =

Live album by Raphe Malik
- Released: 1999
- Recorded: July 26, 1997
- Venue: UMASS, Amherst, Massachusetts
- Genre: Jazz
- Length: 65:52
- Label: Eremite
- Producer: Michael Ehlers

Raphe Malik chronology
The Short Form (1997)	ConSequences (1999)	Storyline (2000)

ConSequences is an album by American jazz trumpeter Raphe Malik, which was recorded live at the 2nd Fire in the Valley Festival in 1997 and released on the Eremite label. He leads a quartet with tenor saxophonist Sabir Mateen, bassist William Parker and drummer Denis Charles in one of his last recorded performances.

== Reception ==
Professional ratings
Review scores
Source	Rating
AllMusic	3/5 stars
The Penguin Guide to Jazz	3/4 stars

In his review for AllMusic, Thom Jurek states "Malik is an improviser concerned with the outer limits, but not at the expense of what has evolved into Western musical architecture. He picked the right band because the versatility of each man in this ensemble is well-documented."

The Penguin Guide to Jazz notes "although this is a chance to hear Denis Charles in one of his final recordings, and Malik and Mateen play some vociferous solos, a strong live performance transfers rather uneasily to CD."

The All About Jazz review by John Sharpe says "The individual components are marvellous but it is the group interplay which elevates this music into the top drawer. Malik is a powerful trumpeter full of heraldic fanfares, excoriating runs and broad smears, in addition to his artful composition."

In his review for JazzTimes Peter Margasak states "Recorded with a group of veterans who understand that raw emotionalism means little without structure or context, the album seethes with white-hot expressionism, but in most cases such displays are outgrowths of the leader's memorable, surprisingly lyrical themes."

== Track listing ==
All compositions by Raphe Malik

1. "Dominant Predicate" – 11:11
2. "The Gift" – 19:10
3. "Ditch Weed" – 10:48
4. "3X Twice" – 9:27
5. "Ghost Dance" – 6:32
6. "GG" – 8:44

== Personnel ==
- Raphe Malik – trumpet
- Sabir Mateen – alto sax
- William Parker – bass
- Denis Charles - drums
