= Foundations (album) =

Studio album by Paul F. Murphy and Larry Willis
- Released: 2009
- Recorded: April 8, 2009
- Studio: Lion & Fox Recording Studios, Washington, D.C.
- Genre: Free jazz
- Length: 1:07:54
- Label: Murphy Records
- Producer: Paul Murphy, Larry Willis

Paul F. Murphy chronology
Exposé (2008)	Foundations (2009)	Freedom's Bell (2017)

Foundations is an album by drummer Paul F. Murphy and pianist Larry Willis. It was recorded at Lion & Fox Recording Studios in Washington, D.C. in April 2009, and was released later that year by Murphy Records.

== Reception ==
Professional ratings
Review scores
Source	Rating
DownBeat	4/5 stars

In a review for DownBeat, Robert L. Doerschuk wrote: "Murphy and Willis build a complex structure on Foundations through their pairing of piano and drums and the application of their formidable musicianship to the process of invention through total improvisation. Each of these tracks starts from scratch. Absent predetermined themes or chords, the foundation alluded to in the title most likely alludes to the process of conjuring something from nothing... the two musicians... are interacting fully, listening intently and opening themselves to any and every type of possibility."

Writing for Jazz Times, Lyn Horton commented: "Paul Murphy and... Larry Willis together create music that is quite simply, hefty. Their recording, Foundations, testifies to their persistence in conveying significant improvised, though structured, messages through their musical language... Neither instrumentalist skips a beat. The pair's interaction is tight, unafraid and thoroughly conscious. For music is their calling; it expresses their experience of life."

A reviewer for Worcester Magazine stated: "It's heady stuff; the type of arty jazz best enjoyed while slumped in the back of a dark club sipping a beer... Without knowing it, Murphy and Willis make a statement here: Foundations is an album to be enjoyed as well as appreciated."

== Track listing ==
All compositions by Paul F. Murphy and Larry Willis.
Track timings not provided.

1. "Foundations"
2. "Epigraph"
3. "Khafre"
4. "Peter"
5. "Morel"
6. "Mr LB"
7. "Paean"
8. "Dance Points"
9. "East Turn Alt"
10. "Composite Drive"
11. "June Jump"
12. "Equinox"

== Personnel ==
- Larry Willis – piano
- Paul F. Murphy – drums
