= Push Pull (Jimmy Lyons album) =

Live album by Jimmy Lyons
- Released: 1979
- Recorded: May 6, 1978
- Venue: Collective for Living Cinema, New York City
- Genre: Free jazz
- Label: Hat Hut Records; Y/Z/Z
- Producer: Pia Uehlinger, Werner X. Uehlinger

Jimmy Lyons chronology
Other Afternoons (1970)	Push Pull (1979)	Riffs (1982)

Push Pull is a three-LP live album by Jimmy Lyons. It was recorded on May 6, 1978, at the Collective for Living Cinema in New York City, and was released by Hat Hut Records in 1979. The album was reissued as a double-CD package in 2016 by Corbett vs. Dempsey. On the album, Lyons is joined by bassoonist Karen Borca, cellist Munner Bernard Fennell, bassist Hayes Burnett, and drummer Roger Blank.

== Reception ==
Professional ratings
Review scores
Source	Rating
Jazzwise	4/5 stars
Tom Hull – on the Web	A−

In a review for Jazzwise, Mike Hobart wrote: "The under-recorded Lyons remains best known for being the fiery sideman with a human touch who graced Cecil Taylor's early recordings. Here his passion, commitment and rich fruity tone are undiminished on a set of melodic, launching-point themes... Lyons' melodic flare, helter-skelter fluency and bursts of phonics standout, while Roger Blank of Sun Ra, Andrew Hill and Albert Ayler fame, is an energetic and sensitive drummer. But with bassoon adding the occasional classical veneer, and bowed cello and double bass a spiritual cry, the music never flags and keeps you engaged throughout."

Peter Margasak of the Chicago Reader called Lyons's solo albums "dynamic accomplishments fueled by a rhythmic dexterity rooted in bebop but liberated from that style’s harmonic demands," and stated: "Push Pull... captures Lyons at his best, displaying his bobbing-and-weaving flow with deft support from a highly empathetic, agile band."

Writing for Dusted Magazine, Derek Taylor called the album "a valuable and illuminating document."

== Track listing ==
All compositions by Jimmy Lyons.

1. "Mary Mary" – 32:42
2. "After You Left" – 23:04
3. "Tortuga" – 17:52
4. "Push Pull" – 14:49
5. "Breakout" – 21:26

== Personnel ==
- Jimmy Lyons – alto saxophone
- Karen Borca – bassoon
- Munner Bernard Fennell – cello
- Hayes Burnett – bass
- Roger Blank – drums
