= The Powers of Two, Volume 2 =

Studio album by Paul F. Murphy and Larry Willis
- Released: 2006
- Genre: Free jazz
- Label: Mapleshade Records; 11232

Paul F. Murphy chronology
The Powers of Two (2004)	The Powers of Two, Volume 2 (2006)	Excursions (2008)

The Powers of Two, Volume 2 is an album by drummer Paul F. Murphy and pianist Larry Willis. It was released in 2006 by Mapleshade Records. The album is the companion to 2004's The Powers of Two.

== Reception ==
Professional ratings
Review scores
Source	Rating
The Penguin Guide to Jazz	3/4 stars

Thomas Conrad, writing for Jazz Times, commented: "The revelation of this recording is Murphy. He is a drummer/sound painter who totally trusts his wildest creative impulses. He responds directly to Willis' forays with a provocative, complex code of his own, then showers Willis' piano decisions in washes of color and dramatic detail."

In an article for All About Jazz, Joel Roberts stated: "It's an odd pairing on the surface - a mostly post-bop pianist known for his subtlety and precision and a free jazz drummer known for his speed and intensity. Yet somehow it works. The two artists display a strong empathy with each rising to the challenge posed by the other; Willis turning up his volume and energy and Murphy showing (occasionally) a softer side. This is rather accessible improvised music... owing mostly to Willis' strong sense of melody. While it's all completely improvised, Willis' solos are so well crafted they often sound like fully realized compositions."

The authors of the Penguin Guide to Jazz Recordings praised the album's sound quality, noting that is "not easy with this instrumentation."

== Track listing ==
All compositions by Paul F. Murphy and Larry Willis.

1. "Freefall" – 5:49
2. "Murky Water" – 7:27
3. "Condor's Flight" – 9:30
4. "Blitzkrieg" – 4:22
5. "Sweet Solitude" – 6:51
6. "Roadmap to Everywhere" – 7:13
7. "Gremlins" – 6:14
8. "Autumn Hue" – 3:28
9. "Jere's Theme" – 3:55

== Personnel ==
- Paul F. Murphy – drums
- Larry Willis – piano
