= Marco Eneidi =

American jazz musician (1956–2016)

- Born: November 1, 1956; Portland, Oregon, U.S.
- Died: May 24, 2016 (aged 59) Pleasanton, California, U.S.
- Genres: Jazz, free jazz
- Instruments: Alto saxophone

Marco Eneidi (November 1, 1956 – May 24, 2016) was an American jazz alto saxophonist. He was primarily associated with free jazz.

== Early life ==
Eneidi was born in Portland, Oregon. His father worked for the Lawrence Berkeley National Laboratory and his mother was a paralegal. Eneidi and his family lived in Livermore before moving to Oakland, California. As a child, he took lessons with Sonny Simmons. He attended Mt. Hood Community College before earning a Bachelor of Arts degree from Sonoma State University and Master of Arts from Mills College. Later in his career, he studied North Indian classical music at the Ali Akbar College of Music in San Rafael, California.

== Career ==
Eneidi moved to New York City in 1981 to study with Jimmy Lyons. He started to play with Jackson Krall, William Parker and Denis Charles. In 1984, he was hired by Bill Dixon to teach at Bennington College. In the early-1990s, he recorded his first important dates as a leader, such as Final Disconnect Notice. He was hired by Cecil Taylor, with whom he played in Europe. Eneidi moved back to the West Coast in the late 1990s, notably playing with Glenn Spearman. In 2005, he moved to Vienna, where he ran weekly free improvisation sessions until his move to Mexico in 2015.

== Discography ==
=== As leader ===
- Vermont, Spring, 1986 (Botticelli)
- The Marco Eneidi Coalition (Botticelli)
- Final Disconnect Notice (Botticelli)
- For Our Children (Botticelli)
- Creative Music Orchestra (Music & Arts)
- Marco Eneidi & The American Jungle Orchestra (Botticelli)
- Live at Radio Valencia (Botticelli)
- Cherry Box (Eremite, 2000)
- Ghetto Calypso (Not Two)
- Live at Spruce Street Forum (Botticelli)
- American Roadwork (CIMP)
- Sound on Survival Live (Henceforth)
- Outpost Live (Botticelli)
- Panta rei (For Tune)

=== As sideman ===
With Paul Murphy

- Shadow Intersections West (Cadence, 2004)

With Glenn Spearman

- Free Worlds (Black Saint, 2000)
