= Enarre =

Studio album by Paul Murphy
- Released: 2002
- Recorded: June 15, 2001
- Studio: Bias Studio, Virginia
- Genre: Free jazz
- Label: Cadence; CJR 1147

Paul Murphy chronology
Breakaway (2001)	Enarre (2002)	Red Snapper: Paul Murphy at CBS (2003)

Enarre is an album by drummer Paul Murphy. It was recorded in June 2001 at Bias Studio in Virginia, and was released by Cadence Jazz Records in 2002. On the album, Murphy is joined by cellist Kash Killion and pianist Joel Futterman.

== Reception ==
Professional ratings
Review scores
Source	Rating
AllMusic	4.5/5 stars
The Penguin Guide to Jazz	3.5/4 stars

In a review for AllMusic, Glenn Astarita wrote: "the band moves forward with the power of a rumbling freight train here.... The band's synergistic approach consists of massive sheets of sound and sweeping undercurrents, as the musicians navigate a plethora of peaks, valleys, and swirling cadenzas... they spur each other through heated moments to complement a few sanguine interludes. Murphy shines radiantly thanks to his relentless attack, awash with tumbling, polyrhythmic-type fills and stinging press rolls. The group engages a modus operandi that is founded upon maddening flurries and verbose exchanges. And despite the rather serious implications, this is a fun-filled affair. Recommended."

The authors of The Penguin Guide to Jazz awarded the album 3½ stars, and commented: "The Enarre trio have worked together before and... they were clearly bursting to play: one piece, "SFERICS", passes the 30-minute mark with no apparent loss of energy or — more surprisingly — invention. Murphy can stoke up some terrific bouts of noise at the kit, although for much of the way he's happy to play more sparsely... Futterman is as fulsome as usual, but Killion is perhaps the most interesting contributor, favouring the bow over the fingers and finding a powerful middle ground between cello and bass terrain."

JazzWord's Ken Waxman called the album "memorable," and remarked: "You can sense Murphy's skills on each of the five instant compositions here. But he doesn't feel it necessary to take an official solo until the final track... the drummer's co-workers operate at the same high level... abstract jazz has a tradition too; you can see its shape in the hands of these adept musicians."

== Track listing ==
All compositions by Paul Murphy.

1. "D1T1" – 4:43
2. "Desert Fire" – 9:40
3. "Intersections" – 15:05
4. "SFERICS" – 30:56
5. "ZYGOUN" – 11:10

== Personnel ==
- Kash Killion – cello
- Joel Futterman – piano
- Paul Murphy – drums
