= The Powers of Two =

Studio album by Larry Willis and Paul F. Murphy
- Released: 2004
- Genre: Free jazz
- Label: Mapleshade Records; 10232

Paul F. Murphy chronology
Shadow Intersections West (2004)	The Powers of Two (2004)	The Powers of Two, Volume 2 (2006)

The Powers of Two is an album by pianist Larry Willis and drummer Paul F. Murphy. It was released in 2004 by Mapleshade Records. The album was followed by The Powers of Two, Volume 2 (2006).

== Reception ==
Professional ratings
Review scores
Source	Rating
AllMusic	3.5/5 stars
The Penguin Guide to Jazz	3.5/4 stars

In a review for AllMusic, Alex Henderson wrote that the duo "enjoy a consistently strong rapport... which favors an inside/outside approach that is somewhere between Tyner's post-bop and Taylor's free jazz," and commented: "For all its abstraction and spontaneity, The Powers of Two never comes across as aimless or mindlessly chaotic; Willis' solos have a sense of sense of purpose and sound like they were meant to happen... it is a solid and engaging demonstration of the pianist's ability to handle both the inside and the outside."

The authors of the Penguin Guide to Jazz Recordings called the album Willis's "most adventurous record for years," and stated: "As the longest track, 'Space Dreams' could probably do with a spot of editing, but there isn't a self-indulgent bar in the rest of it... Nicely balanced sound, too, which is not easy with this instrumentation."

Steve Futterman, writing for Jazz Times, described the album as "an encounter marked by a lyrical yet explorative edge, replete with drama and mystery," and remarked: "On eight spontaneously composed pieces, the duo employs subtlety and carefully calibrated tonal shadings to make their strongest points. Willis... displays a surprising affinity for less structured improvisation... Exhibiting admirable restraint, Murphy extracts shaded hues from his cymbals, shying away from a full force drum attack... These two are out to make affecting music together. By listening so intently to each other, they draw us near as well."

In an article for All About Jazz, Russ Musto stated: "The Powers of Two is an extraordinary undertaking by Willis... the date showcases his imposing but unpretentious virtuoso technique, as well as an amazing ability to build marvelously musical structures without the benefit of prepared material... the eight tracks are all uniquely personal—worthy of compositional refinement and future exploration. Murphy proves to be a fine foil and at times a convincing creative catalyst"

== Track listing ==
All compositions by Larry Willis and Paul F. Murphy.

1. "Awakening" – 7:02
2. "Mood Swing" – 6:38
3. "Aftershock" – 5:49
4. "Space Dreams" – 10:18
5. "Interlock East" – 7:55
6. "Dance of the Equinox" – 7:11
7. "Hi-Jack" – 6:07
8. "And He Never Said a Mumblin' Word" – 8:42

== Personnel ==
- Larry Willis – piano
- Paul F. Murphy – drums
