= The Short Form =

Live album by Raphe Malik
- Released: 1997
- Recorded: July 27, 1996
- Venue: UMASS, Amherst, Massachusetts
- Genre: Jazz
- Length: 58:47
- Label: Eremite
- Producer: Michael Ehlers

Raphe Malik chronology
Sirens Sweet & Slow (1994)	The Short Form (1997)	ConSequences (1999)

The Short Form is an album by American jazz trumpeter Raphe Malik, which was recorded live at the Fire in the Valley Festival in 1996 and released on the Eremite label. He leads a quartet with tenor saxophonist Glenn Spearman, bassist George Langford and drummer Dennis Warren.

== Reception ==
Professional ratings
Review scores
Source	Rating
AllMusic	4.5/5 stars
The Penguin Guide to Jazz	3/4 stars

In his review for AllMusic, Thom Jurek states "This date was an evening that revealed to an enthralled audience what speaking in tongues was all about. As evidenced by The Short Form, Malik should be recorded as a leader far more often than he is. It's simply stunning."

The Penguin Guide to Jazz says "Energy-music followers will love The Short Form, a concert recording that pares the band back to a quartet and lets them explode."

In his review for JazzTimes John Murph notes "Malik's terse tone, blurry trumpet flurries blast through an arresting set of originals that boils with eruptive intensity."

== Track listing ==
All compositions by Raphe Malik

1. "Invocation: Spiel City" – 8:00
2. "Ray (Thine Own)" – 10:00
3. "Civilization After Coltrane" – 13:03
4. "Big G" – 7:36
5. "Hightail" – 4:57
6. "Gem Stone" – 7:16
7. "Grab Bag of Crabs on the Bayou" – 7:55

== Personnel ==
- Raphe Malik – trumpet
- Glenn Spearman – tenor sax
- George Langford – bass
- Dennis Warren - drums
