= Eddie Gale =

American musician (1941–2020)

Edward Gale Stevens Jr. (August 15, 1941 – July 10, 2020), known professionally as Eddie Gale, was an American trumpeter known for his work in free jazz, especially with the Sun Ra Arkestra.

== Life and career ==
Born in Brooklyn, New York on August 15, 1941, Gale studied trumpet with Kenny Dorham. He recorded with Cecil Taylor, Sun Ra, Larry Young, and Elvin Jones, and performed with John Coltrane, Jackie McLean, Booker Ervin, and Illinois Jacquet. In the early 1960s he was introduced to Sun Ra by drummer Scoby Stroman. He spent many hours exposed to Sun Ra's philosophy about music and life. Eddie explains, "Playing with Sun Ra is a great experience--from the known to the unknown. You play ideas on your instrument that you never imagine. His music provoked me to explore the use of trills, for instance, and the placement of whole tones and then a space chord--ideas you do not find in the exercise books."

During the 1960s and 1970s, he toured and recorded extensively with Sun Ra, who influenced him greatly until Ra's death in 1993. After a yearlong stint as artist in residence at Stanford University, Gale moved to San Jose, California in 1972.

Helping to bring jazz into the 21st century, the trumpeter made numerous appearances with Oakland hip-hop outfit The Coup, whereby Gale's trumpet could be heard engaging with the music's breakbeats and turntables.

Eddie Gale died on July 10, 2020, at the age of 78.

== Discography ==
=== As leader ===
- 1968: Ghetto Music (Blue Note)
- 1969: Black Rhythm Happening (Blue Note)
- 1992: A Minute with Miles
- 2004: Afro Fire
- 2007: Joint Happening w/ Mushroom (Hyena Records)
- 2007: In Love Again

=== As sideman ===
With Sun Ra

- Secrets of the Sun (Saturn, 1965)
- Lanquidity (Saturn, 1978)

With Cecil Taylor

- Unit Structures (Blue Note, 1966)

With Larry Young

- Of Love and Peace (Blue Note, 1969)
