= A Rat's Mass =

1967 play by Adrienne Kennedy

A Rat's Mass is a poetic, magical-realist one-act play written in 1967 by African-American playwright Adrienne Kennedy. The play portrays the negative aspects of the black experience in the United States by depicting two African-American children longing for a white child. The play was, like many of Kennedy's plays, not aligned with the Black Arts movement, with a focus on dislocation and femaleness rather than the ideology of blackness.

== Characters ==
Character	Description
Brother Rat (Blake)	Has a rat's head, a human body, and a tail; black.
Sister Rat (Kay)	Has a rat's belly, a human head, and a tail; black.
Rosemary	Wears a holy communion dress and has worms in her hair; white.
Biblical Characters	March in a procession around the stage; silent until the end.

== Plot summary ==
Like many of Kennedy's plays, A Rat's Mass doesn't follow a standard chronological plot. It follows Kay and Blake (Sister Rat and Brother Rat), black siblings who commit a sexual act on the playground at the insistence of Rosemary, a white child who Blake loves. The play takes place in Brother and Sister Rat's house, which they refer to as a cathedral. Sister Rat explains that her mother sent her away to Georgia when she became pregnant with her brother's baby, and the play is Brother Rat and Sister Rat's commiseration on their circumstances. The two siblings discuss Rosemary's beauty and how their house was once a religious place that now runs red with blood; Rosemary explains to the siblings that they are no longer holy. The plot must be ascertained from the non-chronological and absurdist dialogue between the characters. A 1969 New York Times review stated: "The action is nothing but Brother and Sister Rat equating their love for each other with their former adoration for Rosemary - the white and beautiful 'descendant of the Pope and Julius Caesar and the Virgin Mary'."

== Allegory and symbolism ==
Symbol	Representation
Rats	the black experience
Rosemary	the oppressive white population
Holy Family	the uncaring Catholic Church
Blood	life, violence, death
Holy Communion	hope in a system that does not serve you; blind faith
Worms	decay, death
Rosemary's white dress	the corrupting influence of Catholicism
Nazis	the evil in our modern life

== Historical reasoning ==
The play was written in 1967, during the civil rights movement. Kennedy stated that the characters were taken from a vivid dream she had when she was on a train with her seven-year-old son from Paris to Rome, where she was moving for a few months: "It was a very difficult thing for me to do because I'm not really that adventurous. I had never tried to do something like this. In a way, I just wanted to turn around and go back. I had this dream in which I was being pursued by red, bloodied rats. It was a very powerful dream, and when I woke up the train had stopped in the Alps. It was at night. I had never felt that way. It was a crucial night in my life. So, I was just haunted by that image for years, about being pursued by these big, red rats."

Kennedy was inspired by the black experience in the United States, and A Rat's Mass, along with most of her work, deals with the dichotomy between blacks and whites in America. The struggle for power and identity is the main focus of this play, because it was a main focuses of the African American community at that time. A scholar wrote, "Her writing is in many ways an expression of her psychological frustrations. These frustrations often deal with cultural conflicts stemming from her experiences as a black woman and her international travels to Europe and Africa. She is also known for extensive use of symbols and metaphors to convey a deeper message to her audience. She draws on her own experiences as well as those of her friends and families to create rich characters and vivid story lines."

== Productions ==
On August 17, 1969, A Rat's Mass / Procession in Shout was performed at La MaMa Experimental Theatre Club. This version featured music by Lamar Alford. La MaMa then took the show to London's Royal Court Theatre, where it was met with a positive response.

A Rat's Mass was produced at La MaMa multiple times during the late 1960s and early 1970s. Mary Alice performed as Sister Rat in the September and October 1969 productions and the January 1971 production.

In 1976, La MaMa's Annex performed the show with music by Cecil Taylor. A New York Times review wrote that the "plangency of the music echoes the doom-filled sentences of the text."
