= Ayler Records =

French record label

- Founded: 2000
- Founder: Jan Ström and Åke Bjurhamn
- Genre: Jazz, free jazz, improvised music
- Country of origin: France
- Location: Limours
- Official website: ayler.com

Ayler Records is an independent record label that focuses on jazz, free jazz, and improvised music.

== History ==
Named after saxophonist Albert Ayler, the label was founded in Sweden in 2000 by Jan Ström and Åke Bjurhamn. The majority of Ayler's early releases were live recordings of European and American free jazz groups, many of them taped at the Glenn Miller Café in Stockholm, where Ström helped to book musicians. In 2009, Ayler relocated to France, where it is managed by Stéphane Berland, who had joined the label in 2005, and who is now the sole overseer. Recent releases are, according to writer Nick Ostrum, "not really jazz or free jazz, though they all lay somewhere on the musical fringes," suggesting "interesting and unpredictable things to come," and reflecting a broadening of the label's catalogue.

== Cover art ==
Ayler Records releases have been noted for their unique cover art and design. From 2000 to 2008, covers featured a beige background and reproductions of paintings by co-founder Åke Bjurhamn, while releases from 2009 on have cover art designed by Stéphane Berland, who earns a living as a graphic designer and writer in the advertising field.

== Reception ==
Writer Krištof Budke called the label's catalogue "brilliant, forward-thinking, progressive and extremely creative," while reviewer Rex Butters praised Ayler for "[doing] its part to retrieve deserving free records from obscurity." Ayler Records releases have received praise from Jazzwise, JazzTimes, Tom Hull, Point of Departure, Paris Transatlantic, Dusted Magazine, and The Times.
