= Cecil Taylor discography =

The discography of American pianist and poet Cecil Taylor encompasses approximately one hundred and eight albums.

== Albums ==
=== As leader ===
Recording date	Title	Label	Year released	Additional information
1956-09	Jazz Advance	Transition	1957	Debut album
1957-07	At Newport	Verve	1958	Live with the Gigi Gryce-Donald Byrd Jazz Laboratory
1958-06	Looking Ahead!	Contemporary	1959	
1958-10	Hard Driving Jazz also released as Coltrane Time and Stereo Drive	United Artists/Blue Note	1959	With John Coltrane, Kenny Dorham, Chuck Israels, Louis Hayes (and other editions with Steve Lacy, Buell Neidlinger, Dennis Charles).
1959-04	Love for Sale	United Artists	1959	
1960-10	The World of Cecil Taylor	Candid	1960	
1960-10	Air	Candid	1990	
1961-01	New York City R&B	Barnaby	1972	with Buell Neidlinger
1961-01	Cell Walk for Celeste	Candid	1988	
1961-01	Jumpin' Punkins	Candid	1987	
1962-10	The Early Unit 1962	Ingo (Bootleg)	?	Live at Stockholm
1962-11	Nefertiti, the Beautiful One Has Come also released as Complete Live At The Cafe Montmartre	Revenant	1963	Live at Copenhagen
1966-05	Unit Structures	Blue Note	1966	
1966-10	Conquistador!	Blue Note	1968	
1966-10, 1969-11	Live in Stuttgart	BMM (Bootleg)	?	[2CDR] Live in Stuttgart
1966-11	Student Studies also released as The Great Paris Concert	BYG/Black Lion	1973	Live
1967-07	Rotterdam 1967	Headless Hawk (Bootleg)	?	[CDR] Live at Rotterdam
1968-07	Praxis	Praxis	1982	[2LP] Live
1968-10	Respiration	Fundacja Słuchaj!	2022	Live at Warsaw
1969-07	The Great Concert of Cecil Taylor also released as Nuits de la Fondation Maeght	Prestige	1977	Live
1969-11	In Europe	Jazz Connoisseur (Bootleg)	?	Live
1971-07	Piano Solo at Town Hall 1971	FreeFactory	2009	Live in NYC. bonus tracks rec. 1965
1973-03	Indent	Unit Core	1973	Live
1973-05	Akisakila	Trio	1973	Live
1973-05	Solo	Trio	1973	Live
1973-11	Spring of Two Blue J's	Unit Core	1974	Live in NYC. vinyl release was 2000 copies.
1973-11	The Complete, Legendary, Live Return Concert	Oblivion	2022	Live in NYC
1974-07	Silent Tongues	Freedom	1975	Live at Montreux Jazz Festival
1976-06	Dark to Themselves	Enja	1977	Live in Ljubljana
1976-08	Air Above Mountains (Buildings Within)	Enja	1978	Live in Langau
1977-04	Embraced	Pablo Live	1978	[2LP] Live with Mary Lou Williams
1978-04	Cecil Taylor Unit	New World	1978	
1978-04	3 Phasis	New World	1978	
1978-06	Live in the Black Forest	MPS	1978	Live in Black Forest
1978-06	One Too Many Salty Swift and Not Goodbye	Hat Hut	1980	Live in Stuttgart
1979-12	Historic Concerts	Soul Note	1984	Live with Max Roach at Columbia University
1980-02	It Is in the Brewing Luminous	Hat Hut	1981	Live
1980-09	Fly! Fly! Fly! Fly! Fly!	MPS	1981	Live
1981-11	The Eighth	Hat Hut	1986	Live
1981-11	Garden	Hat Hut	1982	Live
1984-10	Winged Serpent (Sliding Quadrants)	Soul Note	1985	
1984-10	Music from Two Continents (Live at Jazz Jamboree '84)	Fundacja Słuchaj!	2021	Live
1986-02	Iwontunwonsi	Sound Hills	1995	Live
1986-02	Amewa	Sound Hills	1995	Live
1986-04	For Olim	Soul Note	1987	Live
1986-04	Olu Iwa	Soul Note	1987	Live
1987-11	Live in Bologna	Leo	1987	Live in Bologna
1987-11	Live in Vienna	Leo	1988	Live in Vienna
1987-11	Tzotzil/Mummers/Tzotzil	Leo	1988	Live
1987-11	Chinampas	Leo	1987	
1988-06	Riobec	FMP	1989	Live with Günter Sommer
1988-06	In East Berlin	FMP	1989	[2CD] Live
1988-06	Regalia	FMP	1989	Live with Paul Lovens
1988-06	The Hearth	FMP	1989	Live with Tristan Honsinger & Evan Parker
1988-07	Alms/Tiergarten (Spree)	FMP	1989	Live in Berlin
1988-07	Remembrance	FMP	1989	Live with Louis Moholo
1988-07	Pleistozaen Mit Wasser	FMP	1989	Live with Derek Bailey
1988-07	Spots, Circles, and Fantasy	FMP	1989	Live with Han Bennink
1988-07	Legba Crossing	FMP	1989	Live
1988-07	Erzulie Maketh Scent	FMP	1989	Live
1988-07	Leaf Palm Hand	FMP	1989	Live with Tony Oxley
1989-06	In Florescence	A&M	1990	
1989-11	Looking (Berlin Version) Solo	FMP	1990	Live
1989-11	Looking (Berlin Version) The Feel Trio	FMP	1990	Live
1989-11	Looking (Berlin Version) Corona	FMP	1991	Live
1990-06	Celebrated Blazons	FMP	1993	Live
1990-08, 1990-09	2 Ts for a Lovely T	Codanza Records	2002	[10CD Limited Edition] Live in London
1990-09	Göttingen	Fundacja Słuchaj!	2021	[2CD] Live
1990-09	Double Holy House	FMP	1993	Live
1990-09	Nailed	FMP	2000	Live
1990-09	Melancholy	FMP	1999	Live with Harri Sjöström, Evan Parker, Barry Guy, Wolfgang Fuchs
1990-07	CT: The Dance Project	FMP	2008	Live with William Parker and Masashi Harada
1991-03	The Tree of Life	FMP	1998	Live piano solo
1992-07	Duets 1992	Triple Point Records	2019	with Bill Dixon
1993-04	Always a Pleasure	FMP	1996	Live
1996-11	Corona	FMP	2018	Live with Sunny Murray
1996-11	Almeda	FMP	2004	Live as nonet
1996-11	The Light of Corona	FMP	2003	Live
1998-03	Qu'a: Live at the Iridium, Vol. 1	Cadence Jazz	1998	Live with Harri Sjöström, Dominic Duval, Jackson Krall
1998-03	Qu'a Yuba: Live at the Iridium, Vol. 2	Cadence Jazz	1998	Live with Harri Sjöström, Dominic Duval, Jackson Krall
1998-08	Momentum Space	Verve	1999	with Dewey Redman & Elvin Jones
1998-10	Lifting the Bandstand	Fundacja Słuchaj!	2021	Live
1999-02	Algonquin	Bridge	2004	Live. Great Performances from the Library of Congress – Vol. 18; with Mat Maneri.
1999-05	Poschiavo	Black Sun	2018	Live solo piano at the Uncool Festival, Poschiavo, Switzerland
1999-11	Incarnation	FMP	2004	Live
2000-02	All the Notes	Cadence	2004	Live
2000-05	At Angelica 2000 Bologna	I Dischi Di Angelica	2020	[2CD] Live recorded during Angelica, Festival Internazionale Di Musica, 10th Edition, May 5–13 and July 5–6, 2000, Bologna, Italy
2000-05	Complicité	Les Disques Victo	2001	Live at the 17th Festival International de Musique Actuelle de Victoriaville (Québec, Canada)
2000-09	The Willisau Concert	Intakt	2002	Live solo piano at the Jazzfestival Willisau
2000-09	The Owner of the River Bank also released as Live In Ruvo Di Puglia 2000 (2021)	Enja	2003	Live with the Italian Instabile Orchestra as part of the Talos Festival in Ruvo di Puglia (South Italy)
2002-05	Being Astral and All Registers – Power of Two	Discus	2020	Live with Tony Oxley
2002-05	Taylor/Dixon/Oxley	Les Disques Victo	2002	Live at the 19th Festival International de Musique Actuelle de Victoriaville with Bill Dixon and Tony Oxley
2003-10	The Last Dance	Cadence Jazz	2009	Live with Dominic Duval
2008-02	Conversations with Tony Oxley	Jazzwerkstatt	2018	Live with Tony Oxley
2008-11	Ailanthus/Altissima: Bilateral Dimensions of 2 Root Songs	Triple Point Records	2009	Live with Tony Oxley
2011-11	Birdland, Neuburg 2011	Fundacja Słuchaj!	2020	Live with Tony Oxley

=== Compilations ===
- In Transition (Blue Note, 1975) – recorded in 1955 and 1959; compiles tracks from Jazz Advance and Love for Sale
- In Berlin '88 (FMP, 1989)[11CD] – recorded in 1988
- Crossing (Jazz Hour, 1989) – recorded in 1966, 73, 74. two tracks with Jimmy Lyons, Alan Silva and Andrew Cyrille plus four tracks solo piano; contains excerpts from Student Studies, Indent, and Silent Tongues.
- Mixed with Roswell Rudd (Impulse!, 1998)

=== As sideman ===
- John Coltrane, Stereo Drive (United Artists, 1959) – rec. 1958
- Gil Evans Orchestra, Into the Hot (Impulse!, 1962) – rec. 1961. features tracks also released on Mixed.
- Jazz Composer's Orchestra, The Jazz Composer's Orchestra (JCOA, 1968) – featured on 2 tracks
- Friedrich Gulda, Nachricht vom Lande (Brain, 1976)[2LP] – 3 tracks
- Tony Williams, The Joy of Flying (Columbia, 1978) – 1 track
- Art Ensemble of Chicago, Thelonious Sphere Monk (DIW, 1991) – rec. 1990. 3 tracks.
