= Respiration (album) =

Respiration: Live in Warsaw '68

Live album by Cecil Taylor
- Released: 2022
- Recorded: October 18, 1968
- Venue: Jazz Jamboree, Warsaw Philharmonic, Poland
- Genre: Free jazz
- Length: 42:55
- Label: Fundacja Słuchaj! FSR 10 2022

Respiration: Live in Warsaw '68 is a live solo piano album by Cecil Taylor. It was recorded on October 18, 1968, at the Jazz Jamboree festival in Warsaw, Poland, and was released in 2022 by the Polish label Fundacja Słuchaj!. The album helps to document a period during which Taylor recorded infrequently, and captures a performance that took place roughly three months after the one heard on Praxis, Taylor's first recorded solo piano concert.

== Reception ==
In a review for The Free Jazz Collective, Gary Chapin stated that the album "adds to the Cecil Taylor oeuvre a nearly perfect 43 minutes of Taylor's solo power recorded at a beautiful level of quality," and described it as "joyfully playful." He remarked: "What once... seemed wonderfully outrageous to me now feels like excellent storytelling. As I get older, Cecil Taylor gets better and better. Can that be right? Of course it can."

The New York City Jazz Record's Duck Baker called the album "a must," and one that "ranks with the most satisfying of Taylor's solo records." He commented: "The fact that his material was considerably different from what we are used to hearing draws the listener in immediately... one rarely hears how dramatic Taylor's dynamic range was on record but you certainly hear it here, from absolute pianissimo to full fortissimo... One senses in his 1968 recordings that Taylor was captured at an exciting moment, growing into his full stature as a pianist, and we hear that excitement in this record."

Phil Freeman of Stereogum noted that, on the album, Taylor is "going deep inside the piano, and deep inside himself, and the fact that you, the listener, are present is at best a secondary consideration. It's brilliant stuff, though, so take it on its own terms and you'll be glad you did."

Writing for the Downtown Music Gallery, Bruce Lee Gallanter remarked: "Taylor's playing here is extraordinary, intense, oft brutal, powerful, diverse, furious at times and unlike any other pianists during that turbulent period. This music, this concert is absolutely incredible and in a class of its own. Are you ready for the exciting ride?!? The take a leap into the unknown and go surfing on the cosmic waves."

Musician and producer Jim O'Rourke described Respiration as "fantastic," and commented: "This is so great, this is AMAZING... It's so good, it's insane."

== Track listing ==
Composed by Cecil Taylor.

1. "Respiration" – 42:55

== Personnel ==
- Cecil Taylor – piano
