= Music from Two Continents =

Music from Two Continents (Live at Jazz Jamboree '84)

Live album by Cecil Taylor
- Released: 2021
- Recorded: October 26, 1984
- Venue: Jazz Jamboree, Congress JHall PKiN, Warsaw, Poland
- Genre: Free jazz
- Length: 1:02:15
- Label: Fundacja Słuchaj! FSR 16 2021

Music from Two Continents (Live at Jazz Jamboree '84) is a live album by pianist Cecil Taylor on which he is joined by a large ensemble. It was recorded on October 26, 1984, at the Jazz Jamboree festival in Warsaw, Poland, and was released in 2021 by the Polish label Fundacja Słuchaj!. The album was recorded several days after the Milan studio sessions documented on Winged Serpent (Sliding Quadrants), and features most of the same musicians.

== Reception ==
The New York City Jazz Record's Duck Baker called the album "excellent," and wrote: "There are fantastic solos, duos and other combinations along the way, but even when everyone is blowing their heads off, it is always, unmistakably, the music of Cecil Taylor."

In an article for JazzWord, Ken Waxman described the album as "another exhilarating musical ride from Taylor and one many will which to climb aboard," and noted: "Containing languorous and muted passages as well as expected frenetic and clamorous ones, the effect is that of multiple distinct timbres proposed at the same time, with internal logic preventing babbling turbulence."

Stuart Broomer of The Whole Note stated: "Like many of Taylor's works, this hour-long piece had a ritualistic character, incorporating chanting and shouting. Here, movements with cries, hollers and snippets of song, hinting at mysteries and suggesting primordial rites, alternate with longer instrumental passages of motivically organized improvisation. These segments touch on Taylor's deep roots."

Writing for the Downtown Music Gallery, Bruce Lee Gallanter commented: "There is some magic glue going on here: the Taylor-led rhythm team is burnin' at the center of the storm while the eight reeds & brass swirl together into an intense, spirited frenzy! Each member of the reeds & brass choir get a chance to stretch out, soar together and add inspired solos. The music here is well-recorded and the entire 60 minute performance is extraordinary from the beginning to the righteous conclusion. It doesn't get any better than this!"

== Track listing ==
Composed by Cecil Taylor.

1. "Music from Two Continents" – 1:02:15

== Personnel ==
- Cecil Taylor – piano
- Jimmy Lyons – alto saxophone
- Frank Wright Jr. – tenor saxophone
- John Tchicai – tenor saxophone
- Gunter Hampel – bass clarinet, vibraphone
- Karen Lyons – bassoon
- Tomasz Stańko – trumpet
- Enrico Rava – trumpet
- Conrad Bauer – trombone
- William Parker – double bass
- André (Henry) Martinez – drums & percussion
