= Ayumi Ishito =

- Born: Ishikawa, Japan
- Genre: Free jazz
- Occupation: Musician
- Instrument: Saxophone
- Years active: 2007s–present

Ayumi Ishito is a Japanese born, New York based, jazz musician and composer who plays tenor saxophone.

== Early life ==
Ayumi Ishito was born and raised in Ishikawa, Japan. In 2007, she received a scholarship to attend Berklee College of Music in Boston, Massachusetts where she studied performance and composition. After graduating she moved to New York City. Ishito has been leading her quintet and performing her own compositions since 2011.

== Career ==
Ishito is an active collaborator in the New York avant-garde jazz downtown music scene. She has recorded and performed with many distinguished musicians, including Daniel Carter, William Hooker, Yuko Togami, Kate Mohanty, and Hajime Yoshida.

== Discography ==
- Ayumi Ishito Wondercult Club (577 Records, 2024)
- Entropic Hop Live at Downtown Music Gallery (2023)
- Open Question Vol. 2 (577 Records, 2023)
- Entropic Hop (2023)
- The Spacemen Vol. 2 (2023)
- Open Question Vol. 1 (577 Records, 2022)
- The Spacemen Vol. 1 (2021)
- View From a Little Cave (2016)
