= Poschiavo (album) =

Live album by Cecil Taylor
- Released: April 16, 2018
- Recorded: May 14, 1999
- Venue: Uncool Festival, Poschiavo, Switzerland
- Genre: Free jazz
- Length: 54:39
- Label: Black Sun; 15046-2
- Producer: Cornelia G. Müller

Poschiavo is a live solo piano album by American musician Cecil Taylor. It was recorded in May 1999 at the Uncool Festival in Poschiavo, Switzerland, and was released by the Black Sun label in 2018. The album, which consists of a single piece with a duration of nearly an hour, was recorded on a Bösendorfer grand piano. Taylor was sixty-nine years old at the time of the recording.

== Reception ==
Professional ratings
Review scores
Source	Rating
The Free Jazz Collective	4.5/5 stars
Tom Hull – on the Web	B+

In a review for The Free Jazz Collective, Colin Green awarded the album 4½ stars, and wrote: "If there is a unifying factor that runs through the performance and these sweeping ranges of timbre and dynamic, it is how Taylor's discourse subtly balances and fuses apparent opposites: formal versus flexible, stylised but spontaneous, tactile and cerebral, a domain of constant transformation which is nevertheless cyclic... We hear a spectrum of textures, enriched by their mosaic-like juxtaposition – pulsating vibrancy cross-cut with hard-edge contours – yet also fine gradations and elegant shading... Recommended, with a handshake."

Critic Tom Hull awarded the album a "B+" grade, and commented: "Rumbles much, roars on occasion."

Bruce Lee Gallanter of the Downtown Music Gallery stated: "Mr. Taylor is in extremely fine form here, tossing off those wonderful fractured lines, balancing those dark low end spidery lines with those upper (right hand) cascades... For those of you who love what Mr. Taylor does, this is a most rewarding release."

Dusted Magazine's Derek Taylor included the album in his 2018 year-end picks. Robert Reigle and Steve Koenig of Acoustic Levitation featured it in their "Best of 2018" lists.

== Track listing ==
Composed by Cecil Taylor.

1. "Untitled" – 54:39

== Personnel ==
- Cecil Taylor – piano
