= Göttingen (album) =

Live album by Cecil Taylor
- Released: 2021
- Recorded: September 15, 1990
- Venue: Junges Theater, Göttingen, Germany
- Genre: Free jazz
- Label: Fundacja Słuchaj! FSR 10 2021

Göttingen is a double-CD live album by pianist Cecil Taylor. It was recorded at the Junges Theater in Göttingen, Germany in September 1990, and was released in 2021 by Fundacja Słuchaj!. On the album, Taylor is joined by an ensemble of a dozen musicians. The recording took place roughly two years after the concert documented on Legba Crossing, and features many of the same players.

== Reception ==
Professional ratings
Review scores
Source	Rating
Tom Hull – on the Web	B+

In a review for The New York City Jazz Record, Phil Freeman called the album "an important release for anyone interested in mapping the many pathways the pianist traveled down in his six-decade artistic journey." He commented: "Taylor's playing is thunderous, but never dominant; he has given the other musicians plenty of material to work with and the horns take extended solos and engage in dialogue and larger conversations. The bassists and drummers create an ambient rumble rather than attempt to impose time and violin rarely pierces the storm of sound, but in the quieter moments when it does, it is a striking and vital addition to the musical environment."

Writing for JazzWord, Ken Waxman stated that the "individual pieces hang together with asides such as gutbucket-style trombone smears, formalized bass clarinet lowing... screechy brass whinnies, excursions into Energy Music saxophone runs and massed string glissandi subsumed as part of orchestral color... the group's strained tonal sections and undulating full-orchestra crescendos segmented by waves of kinetic piano dynamics... add up to a unique Taylor vision deftly interpreted by the band."

== Track listing ==
Composed by Cecil Taylor.

=== Disc 1 ===
1. "Set 1 – Part One" – 44:04
2. "Set 1 – Part Two" – 28:24

=== Disc 2 ===
1. "Set 2 – Part One" – 43:34
2. "Set 2 – Part Two" – 12:58
3. "Encore" – 9:33

== Personnel ==
- Cecil Taylor – piano, voice
- Joachim Gies – alto saxophone, soprano saxophone
- Martin Speicher – alto saxophone, baritone saxophone
- Ove Volquartz – soprano saxophone, tenor saxophone, bass clarinet, contra-alto clarinet
- Tobias Netta – trumpet
- Heinz-Erich Gödecke – trombone
- Harald Kimmig – violin
- Alexander Frangenheim – bass
- Uwe Martin – bass
- Georg Wolf – bass
- Kojo Samuels – percussion, balafon, elephant horn
- Lukas Lindenmaier – drums
- Peeter Uuskyla – drums
