= It Is in the Brewing Luminous =

It is in the Brewing Luminous

Live album by Cecil Taylor
- Released: 1981
- Recorded: February 8–9, 1980
- Genre: Free jazz
- Label: Hat Hut

Cecil Taylor chronology
Historic Concerts (1978)	It is in the Brewing Luminous (1981)	Fly! Fly! Fly! Fly! Fly! (1980)

CD Reissue cover

It is in the Brewing Luminous is a live album by Cecil Taylor recorded at Fat Tuesdays, NYC, on February 8 and 9, 1980, and released on the Hat Hut label. The album features performances by Taylor with Jimmy Lyons, Ramsey Ameen, Alan Silva, Jerome Cooper and Sunny Murray. The album was originally released as a double LP then rereleased as a single CD.

== Reception ==
Professional ratings
Review scores
Source	Rating
Allmusic	4.5/5 stars
The Penguin Guide to Jazz	3.5/4 stars
The Rolling Stone Jazz Record Guide	4/5 stars

An Allmusic review by Scott Yanow states: "Not too surprisingly, the playing is quite intense and dense with only a few moments of lyricism popping through. Taylor sounds very much like a human dynamo while Lyons' solos are full of fragile beauty. This is brilliant music that will not sound 'safe' or 'easy listening' even a century from now". In a New York Times article, Robert Palmer praised the interplay of the two drummers, and called the album "an intriguing microcosm of the sort of ensemble interplay Mr. Taylor has always encouraged."

The authors of the Penguin Guide to Jazz Recordings commented: "There is a long piano solo... which personifies the new currents of feeling in Taylor's work: small motifs, pensive longer lines and the familiar thunder realigned within an accessible but uncompromised method."

Writing for All About Jazz, Glenn Astarita called It is in the Brewing Luminous "a stunning glimpse of the pianist's interaction with his then musical soulmate, alto saxophonist Jimmy Lyons... Throughout, Lyons darts, jabs and spars with Taylor... while the rhythm section lays down the often hectic spark and oscillating pulse. Essentially, Taylor and co. embark upon a wanderlust of micro-themes, and blistering undercurrents amid gargantuan opuses and unsurpassed energetic spirit! Highly recommended." In another article for the same publication, Robert Spencer wrote: "for all the astonishing fire-breathing quality of this music... it never loses its sense of inner logic or its cataclysmic dramatic power. Taylor is famous for pounding the keyboard with his elbows, and there is some of that here. But to emphasize that aspect of the music... would not do justice to the astounding facility of Taylor's high-speed, high volume improvisations."

Saxophonist Shabaka Hutchings included the album in a list of "five records that challenge the meaning of spiritual jazz", writing: "This was the first jazz album of this style that I ever heard and it caused time to collapse. I entered a sonic world in which my regular priorities were usurped and replaced by naked surrender to an intensity that seemed to not start or end in any fixed place. This wasn't goal oriented motion, it was the harnessing of an energy source that has been in existence long before musicians used it to articulate stories and insights from the world around them."

== Track listing ==
All compositions by Cecil Taylor.

1. "It Is in the Brewing Luminous, Part 1" - 34:59
2. "It Is in the Brewing Luminous, Part 2" - 33:59

- Recorded at Fat Tuesdays, NYC, on February 8 & 9, 1980

== Personnel ==
- Cecil Taylor – piano, vocals
- Jimmy Lyons – alto saxophone
- Ramsey Ameen – violin
- Alan Silva – bass, cello
- Jerome Cooper – drums, balaphone
- Sunny Murray – drums
