= Air Above Mountains =

Live album by Cecil Taylor
- Released: 1978
- Recorded: August 20, 1976
- Genre: Free jazz
- Length: 76:15
- Label: Inner City/Enja

Cecil Taylor chronology
Dark to Themselves (1976)	Air Above Mountains (1978)	Cecil Taylor Unit (1978)

Professional ratings
Review scores
Source	Rating
Allmusic	4/5 stars
The Rolling Stone Jazz Record Guide	4/5 stars
The Penguin Guide to Jazz Recordings	3.5/4 stars

Air Above Mountains (Buildings Within) is a live album by Cecil Taylor performing a solo piano concert recorded at the Moosham Castle in Langau, Austria on August 20, 1976.

== Reception ==
The Allmusic review by Scott Yanow states "Except for some brief moments, his music is quite intense, percussive, crowded and overflowing with passion. Taylor's longtime fans will find much to marvel at while newcomers to his music are advised instead to check out his earlier (and less dissonant) sessions from the 1950s first".

In a brief tribute to Air Above Mountains in the Chicago Tribune, journalist Jack Fuller wrote: "To breathe Cecil Taylor's rarified piano atmosphere, you have to have been acclimated. Straight jazz won't do it. Contemporary European art music is closer, thin on conventional harmonic structure and without recognizable melodic line. When you have learned to live in this thin but bracing abstract atmosphere, Taylor's improvisations are as magnificent as a mountaintop: hard, inaccesible and grand."

Nat Hentoff described Air Above Mountains as "unyieldingly absorbing – in terms of inexorable logic of its structures, the kaleidoscopic swiftness of his melodic inventions, leaps through pulsing time, and the oversize feeling with which all these elements are fused."

Greg Tate referred to Air Above Mountains as "a marathon... architectonic solo where Cecil designs a cathedral with one hand and hammers that sucker together with the other."

== Influence ==
In an interview, pianist Craig Taborn stated that he borrowed Air Above Mountains from a library when he was 13 years old. He recalled: "It really had an impact on me... I don't think I understood it when I first heard it. But it really intrigued me because I could hear something going on in that long-form solo piano concert idea."

In an homage to Taylor, pianist / composer Myra Melford said that, while in college, "I lived in this little cottage on a bay in Puget Sound, outside of Olympia, Washington. And I remember lying on the bed and listening to... Air Above Mountains over and over again. That was when I fell in love with Cecil. The way he moved between the high-energy, clustery textures and his sublimely harmonic lyricism felt so intuitive and natural to me." She recalled: "I had a very visceral, physical, kinetic response to his music; it was unfamiliar, on the one hand, but it also felt very familiar, as if my body would like to do that too... I felt such a kinship with him. It was as if he was saying, 'You can play the piano the way I do and make it your own'... I associate the first time I heard Air Above Mountains as a kind of initiation—that somehow Cecil was opening this doorway to another world for me... He lit a fire in me to aspire to make music that could do the same thing for others."

Pianist Matthew Shipp stated: "The major models for solo pianists of my generation would be solo concerts — Keith Jarrett's Koln Concerts and Cecil Taylor's Air Above Mountains... Those albums provided a model for a new realm of improvisation, intellectual structure and emotion to explore with solo piano using a vocabulary that was very idiosyncratic to a particular composer. I consider myself as continuing the evolution of that idea, but in my own distinct way."

Guitarist Ernesto Diaz-Infante stated that his 2017 album Manitas was "inspired by listening to Cecil Taylor's Air Above Mountains. It's a spectral way of playing I have been developing, of avoiding melodies or harmonies, and using extended techniques, strumming, free-form fingering and picking, that verges on noise. I'm interested in automatism, letting the unconscious mind take control."

In a 2018 interview, Drummer Jason Levis said that his project "No Ins & Outs", a duo with bassist Lisa Mezzacappa, was an "examination" of Air Above Mountains. He stated: "I had done a bunch of research on Air Above Mountains (Buildings Within) for my qualifying exams at UC Berkeley, and one of the main things I did was map out the limited number of musical materials he's using in those 45 minutes and how they relate to each other. He's juggling that handful of materials throughout the piece in this wonderfully masterful way. It is fast, clear, relentless. So that was our jumping off point; she and I did a lot of listening, talking, transcribing, and rehearsing... We wanted to uncover the way he works with his materials. How does he do that for 45 minutes with such clarity and density?"

== Scholarly work ==
Steven Block's 1990 article "Pitch-Class Transformation in Free Jazz" contains a gestural analysis of an excerpt from Air Above Mountains. Regarding Taylor's "constructionistic" approach to music, Block notes: "The working-out of material is an additive or subtractive process in which motives or pitch material are not only reinterpreted and reworked but also altered slightly from phrase to phrase in a chain of progression that may span a long period of time. The final material may not, therefore, necessarily be understood as related to the original except in the sense that it lies at the opposite end of a musical process."

On October 26, 2019, as part of a lecture / concert series called "Unit Structures: The Art of Cecil Taylor" at Brooklyn College's Buchwald Theater, Professor Nahum Dimitri Chandler of University of California Irvine presented a paper titled "Air Above Mountains (Buildings Within): A Meditation". The abstract of the paper reads: "This discussion will propose the value of the pursuit of an understanding of the itinerary of Cecil Taylor's musical and general artistic cultivation from the eruptive articulation of his work Indent in early 1973 through his transformative realization in the work recorded as Air Above Mountains (Buildings Within), just past mid-year, summer, 1976). While several conjunctures of Taylor's work may be understood as pathbreaking, it may be proposed that the art announced by him across that temporal-space emerged as radical and remained decisive in a singular manner throughout his itinerary of practice."

== Track listing ==
All compositions by Cecil Taylor

1. "Air Above Mountains (Buildings Within) part 1" – 44:22
2. "Air Above Mountains (Buildings Within) part 2" – 31:53
  - Recorded at the Moosham Castle in Langau, Austria on August 20, 1976

== Personnel ==
- Cecil Taylor – piano
