= Pleistozaen Mit Wasser =

Live album by Cecil Taylor & Derek Bailey
- Released: 1989
- Recorded: July 9, 1988
- Genre: Free jazz
- Label: FMP

Cecil Taylor chronology
Remembrance (1989)	Pleistozaen Mit Wasser (1989)	Spots, Circles, and Fantasy (1989)

Pleistozaen Mit Wasser is a live album featuring a performance by Cecil Taylor and Derek Bailey recorded in Berlin on July 9, 1988 as part of month-long series of concerts by Taylor and released on the FMP label.

== Reception ==
Professional ratings
Review scores
Source	Rating
AllMusic	3/5 stars
The Penguin Guide to Jazz Recordings	4/4 stars

The AllMusic review by Thom Jurek states "Two of the wizards of free improvisation — hell, a pair of the weirdest and most wonderful guys ever to play music — team up for an evening in Berlin in 1988. Most notable about this set is that Derek Bailey plays half of it on acoustic guitar and half of it on electric guitar, and what didn't happen... There isn't any heat (at least not the kind one would expect from such a meeting); there isn't the kind of explosive aggression one would expect from Taylor and so formidable a partner. In the end, the set never goes anywhere really, becoming a meandering mass of ideas that don't connect to each other or to anything else. What a disappointment".

The authors of The Penguin Guide to Jazz awarded the album 4 stars, calling it a "particularly brilliant example... of Taylor's adaptive capabilities."

== Track listing ==
All compositions by Cecil Taylor & Derek Bailey.

1. "First Part: acoustic guitar" - 28:59
2. "Second Part: electric guitar" - 33:02

- Recorded in Berlin on July 9, 1988

== Personnel ==
- Cecil Taylor: piano, voice
- Derek Bailey: acoustic guitar (track 1), electric guitar (track 2)
