= Looking (Berlin Version) Solo =

Live album by Cecil Taylor
- Released: 1990
- Recorded: November 1, 1989
- Genre: Free jazz
- Label: FMP

Cecil Taylor chronology
In Florescence (1990)	Looking (Berlin Version) Solo (1990)	Looking (Berlin Version) The Feel Trio (1990)

Looking (Berlin Version) Solo is a live album featuring a solo performance by Cecil Taylor recorded in Berlin on November 1, 1989, and released on the FMP label.

== Reception ==
Professional ratings
Review scores
Source	Rating
AllMusic	4/5 stars
The Penguin Guide to Jazz	4/4 stars

The AllMusic review by Brian Olewnick states: "This live performance isn't outstandingly different from numerous others, but is nonetheless fascinating, exciting, and beautiful... If he'd mellowed a bit by this time, Taylor was still quite capable of working up a storm that dwarfed the efforts of 99 percent of those who attempted to emulate him, and did so with a balletic grace that his imitators could only dream of... The five brief concluding pieces are simply marvelous -- concise studies that gleam like rubies, concentrated nuggets of power and delicacy that no one but Taylor could ever create... Highly recommended".

John Corbett wrote: "A relaxed, slightly reserved Taylor emerges here, full of flame but more than ever investigating a kind of majesty, grandeur, lyricism, and elegance. Sustain helps, and he's never used the pedal so much. This rounds some of the more percussive angles of his music; it lets him savor a bit, emphasizing intervallic as much as rhythmic density. Over the years, Taylor has developed several trademarks strategies: mirror image left and right hands (sort of instant retrograde inversion), stately bass chord figures; identical patterns rapidly shifted from register. On the long piece that forms the bulk of this recording, these are contrasted, mutated, grafted together, and truncated, serving both as genetic material and as thematic guideposts through the underbrush of improvisation."

Writing for Burning Ambulance, Phil Freeman commented:

The piano sounds like a gigantic steel harp at times, the strings zinging and seeming to fly loose. The notes have a sharp edge, like the keys are made of glass. He moves with inhuman rapidity from barrages of single-note strikes like raindrops hitting a pond, spaced just far enough apart that each one can be heard landing, to clanging chords possibly struck with his entire forearm, to rumbling bass-line-ish figures succeeded by clusters of high notes like a thousand glass beads striking a marble floor and bouncing every which way. The two long sections that begin the performance seem arbitrarily divided; it could just as easily be a single hour-long piece as two half-hour ones, since it's not like Taylor even stops for breath. Throughout the marathon, he can be heard cackling softly and hissing and meowing along with the sounds produced by his sharp, pointed fingers. When he winds his way to a slow, descending sequence of notes, repeating the final low note once like the period at the end of a hundred-page-long sentence, it has a finality that makes you feel like anything else you do all day will be an anticlimax. And yet... the five encores that follow don't seem like afterthoughts or footnotes; they share enough melodic and conceptual DNA with the big piece that they're Taylor's way of saying "and another thing..." and expanding on his thesis just a little bit more.

== Track listing ==
All compositions by Cecil Taylor.

1. "Section 1" - 30:14
2. "Section 2" - 27:57
3. "Section 3" - 1:22
4. "Section 4" - 3:45
5. "Section 5" - 2:34
6. "Section 6" - 1:43
7. "Section 7" - 2:04

- Recorded at the Total Music Meeting, Quartier Latin, in Berlin, Germany on November 1, 1989

== Personnel ==
- Cecil Taylor – piano
