= Nailed (Cecil Taylor album) =

Live album by Cecil Taylor
- Released: 2000
- Recorded: September 26, 1990
- Genre: Free jazz
- Length: 78:08
- Label: FMP
- Producer: Jost Gebers

Cecil Taylor chronology
Double Holy House (1990)	Nailed (2000)	Melancholy (1990)

Nailed is a live album by Cecil Taylor, Evan Parker, Barry Guy and Tony Oxley recorded on September 26, 1990 at the Bechstein Concert Hall in Berlin and released on the FMP label.

== Reception ==
Professional ratings
Review scores
Source	Rating
Allmusic	4.5/5 stars
The Penguin Guide to Jazz Recordings	4/4 stars

The Allmusic review by Thom Jurek states "This is a group who insists on being individuals in a collective setting and, therefore, the listening level is so high — so as not to miss any gauntlet laid down — the attention to execution and imagination can't help but be top-notch. So, in essence, this is a super-session, but not one in the usual sense. It is among the finest of all the recordings released under Taylor's name from either of his Berlin periods, and, for the others, it charts with their best playing anywhere. This is group improvisation at its angriest, freest, and truest".

The authors of the Penguin Guide to Jazz Recordings awarded the album a maximum four-star rating, and commented: "only a few minutes into the first of two pieces... it's clear that the music has a special ration of power and exercised skills... the exciting thing about the intensity which the quartet reaches ten minutes into this piece is the clarity, even at such a tumultuous level of activity... FMP secures a recording of fine accuracy and detail, and the consequence is a mighty document indeed."

== Track listing ==
Compositions by Cecil Taylor.

1. "First" - 52:20
2. "Last" - 25:48

- Recorded at the Bechstein Concert Hall, Berlin on September 26, 1990

== Personnel ==
- Cecil Taylor: piano
- Barry Guy: double bass
- Tony Oxley: drums
- Evan Parker: tenor saxophone (track 1), soprano saxophone (track 2)
