= The Great Concert of Cecil Taylor =

Live album by Cecil Taylor
- Released: 1977
- Recorded: July 29, 1969
- Genre: Free jazz
- Label: Prestige

Cecil Taylor chronology
Praxis (1969)	The Great Concert of Cecil Taylor (1977)	Indent (1973)

Nuits de la Fondation Maeght Cover

Professional ratings
Review scores
Source	Rating
Allmusic	5/5 stars
The Rolling Stone Jazz Record Guide	4/5 stars

The Great Concert of Cecil Taylor is a live album by Cecil Taylor recorded in St. Paul de Vence, Nice, on July 29, 1969, and released on the Prestige label in 1977 as a 3-LP set. The album was originally released as Nuits de la Fondation Maeght on the French Shandar label as a box set, consisting of three separate LPs in 1971. It features a performance by Taylor with Jimmy Lyons, Sam Rivers and Andrew Cyrille.

== Reception ==
The AllMusic review by Scott Yanow refers to this recording as "a real blowout" and "a major release," and states: "The music is unrelentingly intense and Taylor does not let up for a moment.... listeners new to Taylor's music should investigate his solo piano works first."

== Track listing ==
All compositions by Cecil Taylor.

1. "Second Act Of A (Part 1)" - 21:17
2. "Second Act Of A (Part 2)" - 20:51
3. "Second Act Of A (Part 3)" - 18:08
4. "Second Act Of A (Part 4)" - 16:11
5. "Second Act Of A (Part 5)" - 12:45
6. "Second Act Of A (Part 6)" - 20:38

- Recorded in St. Paul de Vence, Nice, on July 29, 1969

== Personnel ==
- Cecil Taylor: piano
- Jimmy Lyons: alto saxophone
- Sam Rivers: soprano saxophone, tenor saxophone
- Andrew Cyrille: drums
