= Solo (Cecil Taylor album) =

Live album by Cecil Taylor
- Released: 1973
- Recorded: May 29, 1973
- Genre: Free jazz
- Length: 30:52
- Label: Trio (Japan)
- Producer: Toshinari Koinuma

Cecil Taylor chronology
Akisakila (1973)	Solo (1973)	Spring of Two Blue J's (1973)

Solo is a live album by Cecil Taylor recorded at Iino Hall in Chiyoda, Tokyo on May 29, 1973, and released on the Japanese Trio label.

== Track listing ==
All compositions by Cecil Taylor.

1. "Choral of Voice (Elesion)" - 7:15
2. "Lono" - 9:19
3. "Asapk in Ame" - 7:03
4. "Indent" - 7:15

- Recorded in Tokyo on May 29, 1973

== Personnel ==
- Cecil Taylor – piano
