= Pictures in a Frame =

Studio album by Max Roach Quartet
- Released: 1979
- Recorded: September 10, 11 & 17, 1979
- Genre: Jazz
- Length: 40:07
- Label: Soul Note
- Producer: Giovanni Bonandrini

Max Roach chronology
| One in Two - Two in One (1979) | Pictures in a Frame (1979) | Historic Concerts (1979) |

Pictures in a Frame is an album by American jazz drummer Max Roach, recorded in 1979 for the Italian Soul Note label.

== Reception ==
Professional ratings
Review scores
| Source | Rating |
|---|---|
| AllMusic | 4/5 stars |
| Tom Hull | B+ |
| The Penguin Guide to Jazz Recordings | 3/4 stars |
| The Rolling Stone Jazz Record Guide | 3/5 stars |

The AllMusic review by Scott Yanow stated: "Although the group would continue to grow and evolve, it was already a pretty impressive unit by 1979. As usual with Max Roach's bands, this group filled the gap between hard bop and the avant-garde".

== Track listing ==
All compositions by Max Roach except as indicated

1. "Reflections" – 3:36
2. "Mwalimu" (Odean Pope) – 8:16
3. "A Place of Truth" – 4:11
4. "China's Waltz" (Calvin Hill) – 4:27
5. "Mail Order" (Pope) – 3:26
6. "Japanese Dream" (Clifford Jordan) – 3:40
7. "Magic" (Cecil Bridgewater) – 5:08
8. "Back to Basics" (Hill) – 3:56
9. "Ode from Black Picture Show" – 3:27

- Recorded at Barigozzi Studio in Milano, Italy on September 10, 11 & 17, 1979

== Personnel ==
- Max Roach – drums, piano, vocals
- Cecil Bridgewater – trumpet, flugelhorn
- Odean Pope – tenor saxophone
- Calvin Hill – bass
