= Regalia (album) =

Live album by Cecil Taylor & Paul Lovens
- Released: 1989
- Recorded: June 26, 1988
- Genre: Free jazz
- Label: FMP

Cecil Taylor chronology
In East Berlin (1988)	Regalia (1989)	The Hearth (1988)

Regalia is a live album by Cecil Taylor and Paul Lovens recorded in Berlin on June 26, 1988 as part of month-long series of concerts by Taylor and released on the FMP label.

In his liner notes, Alexander von Schlippenbach wrote: "Among Lovens' most striking qualities is a special sensitivity and flexibility for grasping what's going on as a pre-condition for his extraordinary quick-wittedness and expertise, which he is prepared to use in each and every way. Also in other respects, being so well-equipped, he can just slide into the playing, pushing, in the way he follows Taylor, allowing the pianist, in his turn to catch hold, and make use of what Lovens has diverted from his own (Taylor's) previous offerings."

== Reception ==
Professional ratings
Review scores
Source	Rating
Allmusic	4/5 stars
The Penguin Guide to Jazz Recordings	4/4 stars

The Allmusic review by Thom Jurek states "The most interesting thing about this pairing is the contrast in styles... Lovens is a drummer of nuance and often subtlety. His percussive methodology is based on mannerism and intricate execution to offer color, shape, and depth to whomever he's accompanying... What this meant for Taylor... is that Taylor has to adjust his own playing for this to work... By Lovens' articulation of speed and softness, Taylor realigns his own playing and, as a result, a spaciousness not normally present on his recordings appears in the middle of the mix. In that space is a percussive lyricism so beautiful and so pronounced that it's hard to believe everybody doesn't play this way. Regalia is a rare find for Taylor aficionados, and a true showcase of the genius two men can display when they are open to change musically and personally.

== Track listing ==
All compositions by Cecil Taylor & Paul Lovens.

1. "Snake Charm" - 42:08
2. "Regalia" (dedicated to Paul's Garden and Kitchen Tools) - 32:04

- Recorded in Berlin on June 26, 1988

== Personnel ==
- Cecil Taylor – piano
- Paul Lovens – drums
