= Alms/Tiergarten (Spree) =

Live album by Cecil Taylor
- Released: 1989
- Recorded: July 2, 1988
- Genre: Free jazz
- Label: FMP

Cecil Taylor chronology
The Hearth (1989)	Alms/Tiergarten (Spree) (1989)	Remembrance (1989)

Professional ratings
Review scores
Source	Rating
AllMusic	3/5 stars
The Penguin Guide to Jazz Recordings	4/4 stars

Alms/Tiergarten (Spree) is a live album by Cecil Taylor with the Cecil Taylor European Orchestra recorded in Berlin on July 2, 1988, as part of month-long series of concerts by Taylor and released on the FMP label.

== Critical reception ==
The AllMusic review by "Blue" Gene Tyranny states "This set is interesting primarily to hear European musicians interpret Taylor's kinesthetic directing...mostly an intense density of "free playing" (actually following specific internalized instructions and images) with almost everyone going on different gestures at once, with slow unison melodies emerging from the environment". Describing the album as “deeply moving”, The Penguin Guide to Jazz Recordings says it is “a monumental event, the colossal sonic impact tempered by Taylor’s own unflinching, instinctual control and a grasp of dynamics and dramatic possibility which is breathtaking.”

== Track listing ==
All compositions by Cecil Taylor.

1. "Involution/Evolution" – 58:51
2. "Weight-Breath-Sounding Trees" – 63:48
  - Recorded in Berlin on July 2, 1988

== Personnel ==
- Cecil Taylor – piano, voice
- Enrico Rava, Tomasz Stanko – trumpet
- Peter van Bergen – tenor saxophone
- Peter Brötzmann – tenor saxophone, alto saxophone, tarogato
- Hans Koch – soprano saxophone, tenor saxophone, bass clarinet
- Evan Parker – soprano saxophone, tenor saxophone
- Louis Sclavis – soprano saxophone, clarinet, bass clarinet
- Hannes Bauer, Christian Radovan, Wolter Wierbos – trombone
- Martin Mayes – French horn
- Gunter Hampel – vibraphone
- Tristan Honsinger – cello
- Peter Kowald, William Parker – double bass
- Han Bennink – drums
