= Akisakila =

Live album by Cecil Taylor
- Released: 1973
- Recorded: May 22, 1973
- Genre: Free jazz
- Length: 81:44
- Label: Trio Records (Japan)
- Producer: Kuniya Inaoka & Takafumi Ohkuma

Cecil Taylor chronology
Indent (1973)	Akisakila (1973)	Solo (1973)

Akisakila is a live album by Cecil Taylor recorded at Koseinenkin Dai-Hall, in Tokyo in May 1973 and originally released on the Japanese Trio label as a double LP. It features a performance by Taylor with Jimmy Lyons and Andrew Cyrille.

== Reception ==
Professional ratings
Review scores
Source	Rating
Allmusic	4.5/5 stars
DownBeat	4/5 stars

The Allmusic review by Thom Jurek states "The early '70s was Taylor's most articulate period of his method of propelling dynamic energy forth into conical spirals of harmonic mystery and danger. While his music had dispensed with the notions of form and interval long before this, the simultaneous explosion of group energy reached its first zenith during this period... This date, though recorded a decade later, is a fine complement to Nefertiti, the Beautiful One Has Come".

Saxophonist Henry Kuntz wrote: "Taylor's music has less to do with the presentation of a particular piece of music (though there are certainly identifiable compositional interests) than it does with the total re-creation/transformation of the sound environment of the listener... The length of Taylor's pieces, their 'intensity,' is almost entirely directed toward breaking through the listener's defenses, to completely destroying, to the extent possible, the split between audience-performer. For as long as the music exists as something 'out there,' something able to be objectified, so one concentrates on it rather than simply experiencing it. The difference, it seems to me, is crucial. The former attitude approaches the music as a western linear 'art' form (able to be codified, commoditized, and finally commercialised) whereas the latter 'understands' and simply accepts the music as the organic improvisational sound ritual which it actually is... The music envelops, but does not overwhelm, the listener; it draws the listener into it, yet leaves space (even in its density) for the listener to exist within it. One may then enter into the musical expression rather than simply witness its realization."

== Track listing ==
All compositions by Cecil Taylor.

1. "Bulu Akisakira Kutala, Part 1" – 40:42
2. "Bulu Akisakira Kutala, Part 2" – 40:59
  - Recorded in Tokyo, May 22, 1973

== Personnel ==
- Cecil Taylor: piano
- Jimmy Lyons: alto saxophone
- Andrew Cyrille: drums
