= In Florescence =

Studio album by Cecil Taylor
- Released: 1990
- Recorded: June 8, 1989
- Genre: Free jazz
- Label: A&M

Cecil Taylor chronology
| Leaf Palm Hand (1989) | In Florescence (1990) | Looking (Berlin Version) Solo (1990) |

In Florescence is an album by the pianist Cecil Taylor, released in 1990 via A&M Records. It was recorded in New York City on June 8, 1989, and contains performances by Taylor, Gregg Bendian and William Parker. It was Taylor's first major label recording in more than 10 years.

== Production ==
Some tracks incorporate poetry and chanting on top of the instrumentation.

== Critical reception ==
Professional ratings
Review scores
| Source | Rating |
|---|---|
| AllMusic | 3/5 stars |
| The Encyclopedia of Popular Music | 4/5 stars |
| Entertainment Weekly | A− |
| Los Angeles Times | 3/4 stars |
| The Penguin Guide to Jazz on CD, LP, and Cassette | 3.5/4 stars |
| The Rolling Stone Album Guide | 5/5 stars |
| Select | 2/5 medals |

The Los Angeles Times called the album "a rolling, often riotous string of short works that have all the usual Taylorisms—pounding exchanges between right and left hands, splashy ascensions and repeated figures charged with dissonance—but also holds surprising moments of lyricism and quiet beauty." Entertainment Weekly thought that "the bass and drums of William Parker and Greg Bendian are models of reflexive interaction."

The Rolling Stone Album Guide wrote that "the listener enters a rarefied zone of elusive beauty; this is dense, compelling music." Gary Giddins, in The Village Voice, declared that he "can not abide" Taylor's vocal interjections on In Florescence.

== Track listing ==
All compositions by Cecil Taylor except as indicated.

1. "J." - 2:52
2. "Pethro Visiting the Abyss" - 7:08
3. "Saita" - 3:00
4. "For Steve McCall" (Gergg Bendian) - 1:00
5. "In Florescence" - 3:02
6. "Ell Moving Track" - 5:15
7. "Sirenes 1/3" - 0:48
8. "Anast in Crisis Mouthful of Fresh Cut Flowers" (William Parker) - 3:37
9. "Charles And Thee" - 8:00
10. "Entity" (Bendian) - 2:32
11. "Leaf Taken Horn" - 4:53
12. "Chal Chuiatlichue Goddess of Green Flowing Waters" - 11:29
13. "Morning Of Departure" - 3:13
14. "Feng Shui" (Taylor, Bendian, Parker) - 4:35

- Recorded in New York City on June 8, 1989

== Personnel ==
- Cecil Taylor: piano, voice
- Gregg Bendian: percussion (tracks 1–3, 5–7, 9 and 11–14)
- William Parker: bass (tracks 1–3, 5–7, 9, 11–12 and 14)
