= Fly! Fly! Fly! Fly! Fly! =

Live album by Cecil Taylor
- Released: 1981
- Recorded: September 14, 1980
- Genre: Free jazz
- Length: 47:17
- Label: MPS MPS 15575

Cecil Taylor chronology
It Is in the Brewing Luminous (1980)	Fly! Fly! Fly! Fly! Fly! (1981)	The Eighth (1981)

Professional ratings
Review scores
Source	Rating
Allmusic	4/5 stars
The Guardian	4/5 stars
All About Jazz	4/5 stars

Fly! Fly! Fly! Fly! Fly! is a live album by Cecil Taylor recorded at Villingen, Germany, on September 14, 1980 and released on the MPS label. The album features eight solo piano performances by Taylor.

== Recording ==
According to the album notes, Taylor arrived at the MPS studio on Friday, September 12, and practiced five hours (following a flight from New York and a three hour drive). The next day, he practiced nine hours, and the following day practiced eight hours, then participated in the recording session, which lasted three hours. As he was leaving the studio following the session, he wrote in the guest book: "FLY! FLY! FLY! FLY! FLY!"

The following comments by Taylor appear on the album jacket:

The whole question of "freedom" has been misunderstood, by those on the outside and even by some of the musicians in "the movement." If a man plays for a certain amount of time - scales, licks, what have you - eventually a kind of order asserts itself. Whether he chooses to notate that personal order or engage in polemics about it, it's there. That is, if he's saying anything in his music. There is no music without order - if that music comes from a man's innards. But that order is not necessarily related to any single criterion of what order should be as imposed from the outside. This is not a question, then, of "freedom" as opposed to "nonfreedom", but rather it is a question of recognizing ideas and expressions of order.

== Reception ==
A review by Scott Yanow states: "This solo album by Cecil Taylor is a little unusual in that he performs eight originals, some of which are quite concise; "T (Beautiful Young'n)" is only 53 seconds long. That is not to imply that the pianist's music had suddenly mellowed with age but his lyricism is emphasized a bit more than usual and he sometimes sounds quite relaxed (without compromising his music). Writing for AllMusic, Ken Dryden commented: "this 1980 solo piano studio session may be one of [Taylor's] hidden gems, a suite of eight originals that give a better indication of his vast musical knowledge and ability to blend many styles within a single composition. Taylor is very accessible in each of these compositions, drawing from 20th century classical influences in addition to blending bop, avant-garde, brief snippets of boogie and more, creating dramatic pieces that could only be his own. This is easily one of Cecil Taylor's most rewarding record dates, a virtuoso effort that ought to be a starting point for new jazz fans unfamiliar with his work."

In a review for The Guardian, John Fordham wrote: "Taylor often played with ballet dancers... and that artform is constantly evoked here by the flurries of notes punctuated by abrupt halts, tumbling abstract sounds briefly coloured by song-like figures or buoyed up by passing harmonies. For a percussive pianist, some of Taylor's lightly tripping runs are surprisingly dainty, and "Ensaslayi" and "Corn in Sun" are full of jazz's melodic and rhythmic notions, albeit tightly compressed. This set might well be a way into Taylor's music for those who have stopped at the gate before." John Kelman, writing for All About Jazz, called the album "a welcome entry point into the music of an artist for whom 'compromise' and 'pander' are the two dirtiest words of all", and stated: "what Fly!... demonstrates in the clearest possible fashion, is Taylor's broad purview, and complete and utter sense of purpose... Taylor pulls motifs from the ether and works them—stopping, starting, twisting, turning and stretching—with unmistakable animus. Free this may be, but it's still the consequence of split-second decision-making that renders these eight improvisations as far more than the meandering randomness to which free jazz naysayers so often ascribe. There are unmistakable roots in the jazz tradition, with encyclopedic trace elements of everything from stride to bop, but the references are so fleeting that it's easy to miss them. There are changes, too... though how and when they manifest themselves is never anything but unpredictable... There are hints of European classicism, too... even as Taylor relentlessly turns on a dime, moving from one thought to the next with unerring logic and unmistakable inevitability. And there are brief glimpses of real beauty, too, despite often being bookended by more oblique ideation."

== Track listing ==
All compositions by Cecil Taylor.

1. "T (Beautiful Young'n)" - 0:53
2. "Astar" - 6:09
3. "Ensaslayi" - 7:54
4. "I (Sister Young'n)" - 2:23
5. "Corn In Sun + T (Moon)" - 6:15
6. "The Stele Stolen And Broken Is Reclaimed" - 9:23
7. "N+R (Love Is Friends)" - 4:02
8. "Rocks Sub Amba" - 10:18
- Recorded at Villingen, Germany, on September 14, 1980

== Personnel ==
- Cecil Taylor – piano
