= Indent (album) =

Live album by Cecil Taylor
- Released: 1973
- Recorded: March 11, 1973
- Genre: Free jazz
- Length: 44:45
- Label: Arista Freedom

Cecil Taylor chronology
The Great Concert of Cecil Taylor (1969)	Indent (1973)	Akisakila (1973)

Indent is a live album by Cecil Taylor recorded in March 1973, originally released on Taylor's own Unit Core label and subsequently more widely released on the Arista Freedom label. It was the first solo piano performance released by Taylor but was recorded over four years after Praxis which saw limited release in 1982.

Indent was recorded at Antioch College in Yellow Springs, Ohio. Taylor taught at Antioch from 1971–73 and, with bandmates Jimmy Lyons and Andrew Cyrille, led a student orchestra called The Black Music Ensemble.

== Reception ==
Professional ratings
Review scores
Source	Rating
AllMusic	4.5/5 stars
The Rolling Stone Jazz Record Guide	4/5 stars
The Penguin Guide to Jazz	4/4 stars

The AllMusic review by Scott Yanow states "Taylor is quite stunning in his control of the piano, his wide range of percussive sound and his endurance. As is often true of Cecil Taylor's music, this recital is not for the faint-of-heart, but those with open ears will find it rewarding and certainly stimulating".

Robert Palmer wrote: "Taylor's music deals with the creation of energy and with motion... On Indent, he is also attempting a coherently organized exploration of the melodic, harmonic, textural and tonal resources of his instrument... The deliberate clarity of Taylor's musical thought insures performances which are both thought-provoking and accessible."

The authors of the Penguin Guide to Jazz Recordings awarded the album 4 stars, and commented: "Indent is fashioned in three layers, with a thoughtful opening section leading to a second part of contrasting effects and conflicts, before moving to the astonishing, grandstanding arpeggios which sound like the keyboard being levered apart: Taylor may eschew showmanship in some ways, but it's telling that this brings cheers from the audience, and it certainly creates a memorable catharsis."

1995 saw the publication of an analysis of the second layer of Indent in the journal Perspectives of New Music.

== Track listing ==
All compositions by Cecil Taylor.

1. "Indent: first layer" - 13:40
2. "Indent: second layer (part 1)" - 9:50
3. "Indent: second layer (part 2)" - 3:50
4. "Indent: third layer" - 17:25

- Recorded at Antioch College, Ohio, March 11, 1973

== Personnel ==
- Cecil Taylor – piano
