= Algonquin (album) =

Live album by Cecil Taylor
- Released: 2004
- Recorded: February 12, 1999
- Venue: The Library of Congress
- Genre: Free jazz
- Label: Bridge Records

Cecil Taylor chronology
Momentum Space (1999)	Algonquin (2004)	Incarnation (2004)

Algonquin is a live album by American pianist Cecil Taylor. It was recorded on February 12, 1999, at the Library of Congress, which commissioned the work, and was released in 2004 by Bridge Records as part of their series "Great Performances from the Library of Congress". On the album, Taylor is joined by violinist Mat Maneri.

In the album liner notes, Bill Shoemaker wrote: "Maneri met the demands of readying and premiering a piece commissioned by one of the world's great cultural institutions, one composed and performed by perhaps the most visionary piano virtuoso of the past half-century (with whom Maneri had not previously played, even informally), all in a single day. For Maneri, this daunting task was only feasible because Taylor's purpose is to discover the music, not learn it. To this end, Taylor's assiduously, and notoriously sketchy approach to scores works hand in glove with his marathon, high-energy rehearsals; the process creates the piece as much as, if not more than, the scored elements."

== Reception ==
Professional ratings
Review scores
Source	Rating
AllMusic	3.5/5 stars
All About Jazz	4/5 stars
The Penguin Guide to Jazz Recordings	3.5/4 stars

In a review for AllMusic, Rick Anderson wrote: "In the first movement Maneri and Taylor play together as a duo; Maneri's violin is tastefully amplified, which contributes both to a better balance than might have existed otherwise and also an unusual richness of tone. The two players' ideas bounce off one another as often as they feed each other or intertwine, but there is a warmth to their interplay that makes for some very nice moments. Maneri plays solo on the second movement, and his relaxed but emotional rendering of Taylor's musical ideas is very attractive. Taylor takes over on the third movement, and his own solo turn is also impressive. Their final duo passage is more energized than the first, and brings the program to a satisfying close. Fans of Taylor will know what to expect and should enjoy this album; newcomers may find it a bit daunting."

Rex Butters, writing for All About Jazz, commented: "Algonquin features the pianist alongside violinist Mat Maneri, recorded before an audibly appreciative audience. Clearly enjoying the company, Taylor plays it frisky, free and light... Both sound like they brought their A-Game, and with these two, that's good news for every ear." In a separate All About Jazz review, Clifford Allen remarked: "An ever-increasing architectural complexity is fostered by Taylor's music, a continuous feed of structural cells that repeat and build upon one another, often seemingly straying rather far from the original cell but remaining tied to it through 'feeling,' an indescribable weight that lies behind his compositional philosophy of unit structures... it is rather ironic that Algonquin, a partnership with electric violinist Mat Maneri... both exists and works as well as it does... Maneri appears to make scant use of Taylor's structures and only touches on the sonic directions that Cecil points to. Where James P. Johnson rolls and intense runs fill space, Maneri lightly bends notes in ethereal filigree, a feisty complement to Cecil's opus. Yet Maneri's insistence on avoidance causes Taylor to hesitate at times, keeping the pianist more on his toes than one might expect—exactly the sort of good-natured aesthetic sparring that one hopes for in a duo... Algonquin certainly stands out as one of the most curious Taylor pairings. After all, the indescribable knottiness of a blues has been made ambiguous, more knotty, and thereby more bluesy by its own subversion."

Writing for Classics Today, Jed Distler stated: "The 55-minute performance is typical of Taylor's collaborative modus operandi in that he plays the way he plays, and the rest of you try to fit in. Rather than offer a violinistic counterpart to Taylor's virtuosity and visceral power, Maneri courageously sticks to his understated, soft-spoken style, which fuses free jazz, traditional folk fiddling, and baroque bowing techniques in a compelling, organic whole. He also employs an electronic pedal that expands the violin's range below its unplugged parameters into viola and cello territory."

In an article at One Final Note, Matthew Sumera called the album "another monumental performance by Taylor", and wrote: "There is striking interplay here, as is often the case with Taylor in duo, who clearly has chosen this setting for a reason: It provides him the nakedness of solo performance with the uncertainty of another living, breathing, soul. In other words, as close to being alone as possible, with the comfort of intelligent company... Maneri aptly holds his own, and there is a generosity on the part of Taylor that is less often obvious. Rather than torrents of dense sound clusters and smashing of the deep end of the piano, this is a more nuanced, but no less energetic performance, with Taylor playing to the sonority of the violin, feeding and being nourished from its sound... There is a beguiling beauty to Algonquin that is rare in the world according to Cecil Taylor; this does not suggest that there is not a significant beauty of Taylor at full bore, but that here, Taylor is more romantic in his sensibilities; or, to think of it in another way, more human and less God-like. If typical Taylor is the beautiful terror that the many-mouthed, many-eyed, many-teethed visage of Krishna instills in the Bahagavad Gita, this is a Taylor closer to the world: Mortal (perhaps even a bit frail?) but capable of intensity of feeling and emotion that still leaves the rest of us in awe. Algonquin is the statement of a mature master with a consummate partner, another beautiful moment among many."

== Track listing ==
All compositions by Cecil Taylor.

1. "Part One" - 30:36
2. "Part Two" - 4:12
3. "Part Three" - 6:34
4. "Part Four" - 13:21

== Personnel ==
- Cecil Taylor – piano
- Mat Maneri – violin
