= At Angelica 2000 Bologna =

Live album by Cecil Taylor
- Released: 2020
- Recorded: May 10 and 11, 2000
- Venue: Angelica, Festival Internazionale Di Musica, Bologna, Italy
- Genre: Free jazz
- Label: I Dischi Di Angelica
- Producer: Massimo Simonini

At Angelica 2000 Bologna is a double-CD live album by American musician Cecil Taylor recorded during Angelica, Festival Internazionale Di Musica, Bologna, Italy. Disc 1 was recorded on May 10, 2000 at the Teatro Comunale Di Bologna, and consists of a three-part piece for piano and voice titled "Dance of All Seasons." Disc 2, titled "Rap," was recorded on May 11, 2000 at the Teatro Comunale Di Bologna, and features a long interview with Taylor by musicologist and musician Franco Fabbri, followed by a montage created by producer and festival director Massimo Simonini which blends excerpts from the interview with some of the piano music. The album, which contains a 40-page booklet featuring photographs and transcriptions, was released in 2020 by I Dischi Di Angelica.

== Reception ==
Professional ratings
Review scores
Source	Rating
Tom Hull – on the Web	B+

Raul Da Gama called the music on disc 1 "perhaps one of Mr Taylor's finest of the rich concerto-like... works which the pianist composed throughout his solo-playing career." He commented: "All the movements of the work... generate an irresistible verve out of their endlessly colliding cross-rhythms and jauntily swung melodies." Regarding the interview, he noted that "Mr. Taylor is a master of reining everything in and making sense of what might seem like extraordinarily long detours."

In a review for Stereogum, Phil Freeman wrote: "both the music and the interview are fantastic; Taylor was at a peak in the early 2000s. Another live album from this era, The Willisau Concert, is one of my favorite of his solo releases, and this disc, recorded four months earlier, is its equal."

Writing for JazzViews, Ken Cheetham called the music "full to overflowing with sensual animation and physicality," and stated: "This is beautiful stuff and everlasting. Cecil Taylor is the compleat improviser and jazz musician - I could listen to this for hours."

== Track listing ==
=== Disc 1: Dance of All Seasons ===
Music and poetry by Cecil Taylor.

1. "Dance of All Seasons - Part 1" – 26:34
2. "Dance of All Seasons - Part 2" – 26:51
3. "Dance of All Seasons - Part 3" – 12:35
4. "Audience/Applause" – 1:31

== Personnel ==
- Cecil Taylor – piano, voice

=== Disc 2: Rap/Montage of Meanings ===
1. "Dance of All Seasons / Possessing a Door" – 10:03
2. "The Arc of Suspension" – 7:33
3. "No One has the Ownership of Pure Genius" – 5:02
4. "Through the Devotion to Sound to Make Words" – 3:20
5. "I Have Many People That I Bow To" – 8:24
6. "The Ingredient of Life" – 11:48
7. "And Then Usually You Have a Good Time" – 3:44
8. "Montage of Meanings: No Matter What" – 3:17 (montage created by Massimo Simonini)

== Personnel ==
- Cecil Taylor – interviewee, piano (track 8)
- Franco Fabbri – interviewer
