= The Hearth =

Live album by Cecil Taylor
- Released: 1989
- Recorded: June 30, 1988
- Genre: Free jazz
- Label: FMP

Cecil Taylor chronology
Regalia (1989)	The Hearth (1989)	Alms/Tiergarten (Spree) (1989)

The Hearth is a live album featuring a performance by Cecil Taylor with Tristan Honsinger and Evan Parker recorded in Berlin on June 30, 1988, as part of month-long series of concerts by Taylor and released on the FMP label.

== Critical reception ==
Professional ratings
Review scores
Source	Rating
AllMusic	4.5/5 stars
The Penguin Guide to Jazz Recordings	4/4 stars
The Virgin Encyclopedia of Jazz	4/5 stars

The AllMusic review by Thom Jurek states "This is a devastatingly fine gig, and one of the best Taylor played the entire month he was in Berlin". The authors of The Penguin Guide to Jazz Recordings say that the album is one of those they would highlight from the series as “particularly brilliant examples of Taylor’s adaptive capabilities and his partners’ own contributions”. Critic Gary Giddins called the album "a romantic effusion, occasionally discursive and consistently beguiling."

== Track listing ==
All compositions by Cecil Taylor, Tristan Honsinger and Evan Parker.

1. "The Hearth" - 61:31

- Recorded in Berlin on June 30, 1988

== Personnel ==
- Cecil Taylor: piano, voice
- Tristan Honsinger: cello
- Evan Parker: tenor saxophone
