= Amewa =

Live album by Cecil Taylor
- Released: 1995
- Recorded: February 8, 1986
- Genre: Free jazz
- Label: Sound Hills Records

Cecil Taylor chronology
Iwontunwonsi (1995)	Amewa (1995)	For Olim (1987)

Amewa is a live album by Cecil Taylor recorded at Sweet Basil, New York City, on February 8, 1986, and released on the Sound Hills label. The album features a solo performance by Taylor divided into two sections. Additional tracks from this concert were released on Iwontunwonsi.

== Track listing ==
All compositions by Cecil Taylor.

1. "Amewa, Part 1" - 3:19
2. "Amewa, Part 2" - 49:24
  - Recorded at Sweet Basil, New York City, on February 8, 1986

== Personnel ==
- Cecil Taylor: piano
