= Leaf Palm Hand =

Live album by Cecil Taylor & Tony Oxley
- Released: 1989
- Recorded: July 17, 1988
- Venue: Kongresshalle, Berlin
- Genre: Free jazz
- Label: FMP
- Producer: Jost Gebers

Cecil Taylor chronology
| Erzulie Maketh Scent (1989) | Leaf Palm Hand (1989) | In Florescence (1990) |

Leaf Palm Hand is a live album featuring a performance by pianist Cecil Taylor and drummer Tony Oxley recorded in Berlin on July 17, 1988 as part of month long series of concerts by Taylor and released on the FMP label.

In the album liner notes, Bert Noglik wrote: "They play tightly together, each one following the other's musical direction - almost like two migrant birds which instinctively create, synchronously, their own wave patterns. However, Cecil Taylor and Tony Oxley come from quite different cultural and musical traditions. The fact that they are able to find such a sure way of getting together has certainly something to do with the degree to which both have been able to assimilate the experience of Black music and European modern music. No fashionable crossing of frontiers, in order to find the lowest common denominator, but an opening up from both sides, based on a musical identity which can lay claim to the demonstration of an up to date awareness of sound."

== Reception ==
Professional ratings
Review scores
| Source | Rating |
|---|---|
| Allmusic | 4.5/5 stars |
| All About Jazz | 5/5 stars |
| The Penguin Guide to Jazz Recordings | 4/4 stars |

The Allmusic review by Thom Jurek states "The duet... is a study in contrasts. Musically, there is a similarity of approach between the two: Both are physical players with an ear for dark dramatics. Percussively, each attacks his instrument in the same way, palms down, forcing off the fingertips and into the instrument, whether drums or piano. Improvisationally, they differ greatly in that Taylor -- so used to being a soloist -- is proactive while Oxley is reactive; here, they attempt to bring both those roles into sync. Oxley moves his own attack up a notch, employing more elementals than just his kit, trying to 'sing' the drums. For the entire hour, Taylor looks deeply toward a romantic sensibility he seldom shows, creating harmonic fixtures from accents and triples, while simultaneously constructing lyric melodies for Oxley to play from. And he does, weaving absolutely thrilling cymbal and bell lines through Taylor's arpeggios, turning his rhythms inside out to create the appearance of a harmonic register that engages all of the different figures Taylor is firing off like lit matches. There's no letup for the entire set; it's one dazzling display after another until the piece just implodes from exhaustion -- physical, that is, as the ideas still come fast and furious -- and leaves the listener dazed and awed by such a soulful yet pyrotechnic display. This is one of Cecil Taylor's most "melodic" improvisations ever.".

Writing for All About Jazz, Brandt Reiter referred to Leaf Palm Hand as: "music that seems both relentlessly new and oddly continuous. Often Oxley, whose ability to find figural and tonal variation on his kit is awe-inspiring, will carry over Taylor's previous motif as the pianist moves into the next, with Taylor doing the same as the drummer, for a fractional second, takes the lead. It's fascinating, maddening and exhilarating, all at once."

== Track listing ==
All compositions by Cecil Taylor & Tony Oxley except as indicated.

1. "Stylobate 1" - 17:26
2. "Leaf Palm Hand" - 42:20
3. "Chimes (Cecil Taylor) - 3:50
4. "Stylobate 2" - 3:23
5. "The Old Canal" (Taylor) - 2:42

- Recorded in Berlin on July 17, 1988

== Personnel ==
- Cecil Taylor: piano
- Tony Oxley: drums
