= Double Holy House =

Live album by Cecil Taylor
- Released: 1993
- Recorded: September 22–23, 1990
- Genre: Free jazz
- Length: 61:29
- Label: FMP
- Producer: Jost Gebers

Cecil Taylor chronology
2 Ts for a Lovely T (1990)	Double Holy House (1993)	Nailed (1993)

Double Holy House is a live album of a solo piano concert by Cecil Taylor recorded live on September 23, 1990, at The Bechstein Concert Hall in Berlin, with added lyrics and percussion which were recorded on the previous day. The album was released on the FMP label.

== Reception ==
Professional ratings
Review scores
Source	Rating
Allmusic	3/5 stars
The Penguin Guide to Jazz Recordings	4/4 stars

The Allmusic review by Thom Jurek states "Double Holy House begins with one of Taylor's most beautiful and haunting ballads, constructed of minor thirds and diminished sevenths. It's full of half-parsed chord voicings and shimmering glissandi. It's six minutes of inwardly focused, blessed-out pianism. The impenetrability of the work's vocal aspect opens part two and rolls out of Taylor's half-spoken, half-whispered text; it is unaccompanied for about six minutes and gradually percussion and piano begin to enter the text as dimensional sound effects and eventually take it over. By the 15-minute mark, the piano has completely replaced both voice and percussion instruments and becomes one of Taylor's more architecturally minded improvisations. His reliance on the middle to lower registers here creates virtual buildings in sound that he erects one after another until he exhausts his tonal possibilities in one series of motifs and begins another for approximately 50 minutes, until the entire work just vanishes from its dizzying heights of arpeggiated ecstasy".

The authors of the Penguin Guide to Jazz Recordings commented: "Taylor's quietest, most beguiling record ever is a profound meditation on some of the well-springs of what he does. It starts with a beautiful prelude at the piano before an extended recitation of poetry, accompanied by tiny splashes of percussion, and eventually a return to the piano... Eventually the accustomed intensity of Taylor in full flow breaks through, and with his accompanying cries the music searches through vocal and non-vocal tradition with a master's aptitude. Outstanding, again."

== Track listing ==
All compositions by Cecil Taylor.

1. "Double Holy House" - 6:34
2. "Squash People/Eyes Within the Voice/Eucalyptus Intersection and ..." - 54:55
  - Recorded live on September 23, 1990, at The Bechstein Concert Hall in Berlin. Lyrics and percussion recorded on September 22, 1990, in Berlin.

== Personnel ==
- Cecil Taylor – piano, voice, percussion
