= Incarnation (Cecil Taylor album) =

Live album by Cecil Taylor
- Released: 2004
- Recorded: November 4, 1999
- Venue: The "Podewil", Berlin
- Genre: Free jazz
- Length: 1:17:05
- Label: FMP
- Producer: Jost Gebers

Cecil Taylor chronology
Algonquin (2004)	Incarnation (2004)	Poschiavo (2018)

Incarnation is a live album by American pianist Cecil Taylor. It was recorded on November 4, 1999 during the "Total Music Meeting" at the "Podewil" in Berlin, and was released in 2004 by FMP. On the album, Taylor is joined by guitarist Franky Douglas, cellist Tristan Honsinger, and drummer Andrew Cyrille.

In the album liner notes, Bert Noglik wrote: "this music opposes the increasing virtualization, the disembodiment of this world. And, at the same time, it itself can be seen as rejection of the shallow materialism of the world of goods by igniting something indescribable between the poly rythmic interlocking, the whirring sounds, the thundering clusters and the hovering micro tonalities: magic."

== Reception ==
Professional ratings
Review scores
Source	Rating
AllMusic	4/5 stars
All About Jazz	3.5/5 stars

In a review for AllMusic, François Couture wrote: "Incarnation is a special date, something to cherish... this concert packs a lot of excitement, grace, and invention... Cyrille's drumming allies the ferociousness and feline grace of the lion, his playing remaining more confined to the role of an accompanist than Tony Oxley's, yet matching and even anticipating the pianist's mood swings at an uncanny level, just like the days when he was a regular fixture of the pianist's quartet. Douglas offers the strangest contributions: the true wild card of the concert, he keeps on introducing new ideas, from electronic-sounding textures to warped, bluesy licks, to no-brainer rhythmic chugging... Honsinger also displays a wide range of creative moves, his performance corresponding to what he usually brings to Taylor's groups."

Glenn Astarita, writing for All About Jazz, commented: "Taylor and his quartet go climactically fast and furious for the jugular. The pianist peppers and accentuates his bandmates' rumbling and tumbling sense of forward motion... Overall, this recording is one his more compelling dates in recent years. It's partly about frenetic group interaction, shaded with Douglas' occasional implementations of mainstream R&B. Recommended."

In an article for Bagatellen, Walter Horn stated: "Each player is given considerable space..., and each acquits himself quite admirably both in solo and ensemble contexts... In spite of its periods of tremendous intensity, Incarnation also provides generous glimpses of space and warmth and calm—and they are perhaps integrated a bit more gracefully than, for example, the quieter moments were stapled into Nailed or 'Lord of Character'... In sum, Incarnation is another first-rate Cecil Taylor creation."

Writing for The Village Voice, Francis Davis remarked: "The most consistently rewarding of this year's Taylors is Incarnation... As on many of his numerous collaborations with European free improvisers for the German label, the story of this 1999 concert recording is the supporting cast, which is a dilly. For starters, Taylor is reunited with Andrew Cyrille, still the drummer who best understands how much propulsion he needs and when. On 'Focus,' the punishing opener, they pick up right where they left off. Once he gets his bearings, Franky Douglas, a Curaçao guitarist based in Amsterdam, uses his whammy bar for spaceship landings that are more Sun Ra than Cecil Taylor, also daring a hint of funk now and then. But the one who pushes the gathering into overdrive is German cellist Tristan Honsinger, who goes after Taylor from the opening bar. Honsinger's bowing introduces an element of parody not previously heard in Taylor's ensembles; it's as if he's mocking the idea of European propriety, humming silly little songs to himself and waiting for the others to join in. Toward the end of the closer, 'Cartouche,' they do: Honsinger initiates a madcap march, and even Taylor falls in."

Derek Taylor, in a review for Dusted Magazine, wrote: "Franky Douglas... injects ideas and elements previously foreign to much of Taylor's performances. Mutant rock, funk and Afro-pop riffs intersperse with gonzo pedal and whammy bar effects and he effectively jostles the band out of any semblance of a safety zone. The... date is also noteworthy as a long-overdue reunion between Taylor and Andrew Cyrille. The drummer’s part in Taylor’s pair of late ’60s albums for Blue Note, Unit Structures and Conquistador, was a crucial agent in the reshaping of the role of rhythm in creative improvised music. Cyrille's affection for percussion devices peripheral to his standard kit further varies the sound floor here. Cellist and regular Taylor confrere Tristan Honsinger completes the quartet and even gets in on the rampant divorcing from antecedents, laying down a jagged pizzicato groove in the opening minutes of the half-hour long 'Focus.' Taylor’s own listening habits have long-included healthy amounts of classic soul and funk, so it's actually not all that surprising that echoes of these styles have finally found more audible purchase in his own music... Aged a handful of years, this is still vital and topical evidence of Taylor’s musical supremacy and as such, easily recommended. The advantage of new and venerable colleagues and an open-ended approach make it even more enjoyable. Taylor’s place as prime pianistic provocateur remains secure."

== Track listing ==
All compositions by Cecil Taylor.

1. "Focus" - 32:31
2. "Carnation" - 19:31
3. "Cartouche" - 25:01

Recorded on November 4, 1999 during the "Total Music Meeting" at the "Podewil" in Berlin.

== Personnel ==
- Cecil Taylor – piano
- Franky Douglas – guitar, voice
- Tristan Honsinger – cello, voice
- Andrew Cyrille – drums, timpani
