= Historic Concerts =

Live album by Cecil Taylor & Max Roach
- Released: 1984
- Recorded: December 15, 1979
- Venue: McMillin Theatre, Columbia University, New York City
- Genre: Free jazz
- Length: 106:38
- Label: Soul Note

Cecil Taylor chronology
One Too Many Salty Swift and Not Goodbye (1978)	Historic Concerts (1984)	It is in the Brewing Luminous (1980)

Max Roach chronology
Pictures in a Frame (1979)	Historic Concerts (1979)	Chattahoochee Red (1980)

Historic Concerts is a live album by American jazz musicians Cecil Taylor and Max Roach. Recorded at the McMillin Theatre at Columbia University on December 15, 1979, it was released on the Soul Note label in 1984. The album features solo and duet performances by Taylor and Roach; the CD reissue adds interviews recorded after the concert.

Years later, Taylor reflected: "It was a phenomenon, playing with Mr Roach in front of all those people. Ten thousand of them listening to two of us. It was as if two angry prophets had finally managed to get together a crowd. We maybe wondered for a moment whether it would be more eloquent to stay quiet!"

On June 4, 2000, Taylor and Roach reunited at Columbia for a performance during the Bell Atlantic Jazz Festival.

== Reception ==
Professional ratings
Review scores
Source	Rating
AllMusic	4.5/5 stars
The Penguin Guide to Jazz Recordings	4/4 stars
The Rolling Stone Jazz Record Guide	4/5 stars

In a review of the concert, The New York Times music critic Robert Palmer wrote: "One anticipated the evening with special interest because Mr. Roach, the most creative and adventurous drummer to emerge from the first generation of modern jazz in the 1940's, would be working with the premier jazz pianist of the 60's, and because Mr. Taylor has often been exceptionally demanding in his encounters with other artists... Mr. Roach demonstrated once more that he is the most musical of all drummers, and Mr. Taylor proved himself a master of space, color, and rhythmic nuance. And the two musicians listened and worked together."

The AllMusic review by Scott Yanow states: "The passionate music is quite atonal but coherent, with Taylor displaying an impressive amount of energy and the two masters (who had not rehearsed or ever played together before) communicating pretty well".

The authors of The Penguin Guide to Jazz wrote that Historic Concerts "is still exhilarating. Both men warm up in their respective corners, before launching into a huge, 40-minute fantasy that sees neither surrendering a whit of individuality...a valuable historical document."

== Track listing ==
All compositions by Cecil Taylor & Max Roach.

1. "Presentation" - 1:06
2. "Drums Solo" - 5:02
3. "Piano Solo" - 5:04
4. "Duets, Part 1" - 40:04
5. "Duets, Part 2" - 38:32
6. "Interviews, Part 1" - 9:36
7. "Interviews, Part 2" - 7:14

- Recorded at the McMillin Theatre, Columbia University, NYC on December 15, 1979

== Personnel ==
- Cecil Taylor – piano
- Max Roach – drums
