= In London (Dewey Redman album) =

Live album by Dewey Redman
- Released: 1998
- Recorded: October 1996
- Genre: Jazz
- Length: 57:14
- Label: Palmetto
- Producer: Matt Balitsaris

Dewey Redman chronology
African Venus (1994)	In London (1998)	Momentum Space (1999)

In London is a live album by American jazz saxophonist Dewey Redman featuring performances recorded in 1996 for the BBC and released on the Palmetto label.

== Reception ==
The Allmusic review by Scott Yanow awarded the album 4 stars stating " Dewey Redman emerges as an underrated giant".

Professional ratings
Review scores
Source	Rating
Allmusic	4/5 stars
The Penguin Guide to Jazz Recordings	3.5/4 stars

== Track listing ==
All compositions by Dewey Redman except as indicated

1. "I Should Care" (Sammy Cahn, Axel Stordahl, Paul Weston) - 10:55
2. "The Very Thought of You" (Ray Noble) - 9:28
3. "I-Pimp" - 1:45
4. "Portrait in Black and White" (Chico Buarque, Antonio Carlos Jobim) - 9:17
5. "Tu-Inns" - 7:18
6. "Kleerwine" - 4:12
7. "Stablemates" (Benny Golson) - 5:21
8. "Eleven" - 8:58

- Recorded Ronnie Scott's Jazz Club in London in October 1996

== Personnel ==
- Dewey Redman - tenor saxophone
- Rita Marcotulli - piano
- Cameron Brown - bass
- Matt Wilson - drums
