= The Willisau Concert (Cecil Taylor album) =

Live album by Cecil Taylor
- Released: 2002
- Recorded: September 3, 2000
- Venue: Jazzfestival Willisau
- Genre: Free jazz
- Label: Intakt Records
- Producer: Peter Brürli

The Willisau Concert is a live solo piano album by American musician Cecil Taylor. It was recorded on September 3, 2000, at the Jazzfestival Willisau, and was released in 2002 by Intakt Records. On the album, Taylor is heard on a 97-key Bösendorfer Imperial piano.

== Reception ==
Professional ratings
Review scores
Source	Rating
AllMusic	4.5/5 stars
The Penguin Guide to Jazz Recordings	4/4 stars

In a review for AllMusic, Brian Olewnick wrote: "among [Taylor's] recordings after having reached the ripe age of 70, The Willisau Concert is among the very best... it sits comfortably alongside discs like Indent, Silent Tongues, and Double Holy House... The Willisau Concert shows a grandmaster as yet unfazed by age, much less current fashion, and stands as one of Cecil Taylor's finest recordings. Very highly recommended."

Glenn Astarita, writing for All About Jazz, commented that, with this album, "the pianist has added yet another astounding entry into his already rich recorded legacy... Greatness can be an ongoing trait! And where others might fail, Taylor succeeds in often awe-inspiring fashion. Hence, a notion that becomes quite significant during this stunningly executed magnum opus! (Emphatically Recommended)."

Gary Giddins wrote: "The Willisau Concert is... a major statement of Taylor’s maturity... From the first notes, you know you are in the hands of an absolutely confident composer. The piece works its way through short, self-contained units, set off by inhalation-like pauses, maintaining a cohesive integrity that keeps the work focused, its routines less like riffs than the repeats in a sonata... If you think listening to a piano piece for 50 minutes is daunting, consider the concentration required to keep it moving and coherent. Of course, you can always work your way backward from the encores. In either direction, this is a recital to hear."

Writing for One Final Note, Alan Jones remarked: "The Willisau Concert is another fascinating entry into a discography with an already healthy share of solo performances. Both the abrasion and the delicate nuances of Taylor's playing were stunningly captured at the 2000 Willisau Festival... Not to be overlooked, The Willisau Concert is the long overdue union of Cecil Taylor's music with the precision-driven aesthetic of Switzerland's Intakt label."

The authors of the Penguin Guide to Jazz Recordings wrote: "the opportunity to hear Cecil Taylor in as excellent fidelity as this, in concert, on an excellent piano, reminds one of all the missed opportunities of his early years... Never mind: here he is at 71 (!), the music-making still something to marvel at, the energy levels amazing, and the results fine enough to account for a lot of enjoyable future study."

== Track listing ==
All compositions by Cecil Taylor.

1. "Part 1" - 50:02
2. "Part 2" - 13:06
3. "Part 3" - 1:24
4. "Part 4" - 1:47
5. "Part 5" - 1:15

== Personnel ==
- Cecil Taylor – piano
