= Spots, Circles, and Fantasy =

Live album by Cecil Taylor & Han Bennink
- Released: 1989
- Recorded: July 10, 1988
- Genre: Free jazz
- Label: FMP

Cecil Taylor chronology
Pleistozaen Mit Wasser (1989)	Spots, Circles, and Fantasy (1989)	Legba Crossing (1989)

Spots, Circles, and Fantasy is a live album featuring a performance by Cecil Taylor and Han Bennink recorded in Berlin on July 10, 1988 as part of month-long series of concerts by Taylor and released on the FMP label.

== Reception ==
Professional ratings
Review scores
Source	Rating
AllMusic	4/5 stars
The Penguin Guide to Jazz Recordings	4/4 stars

The AllMusic review by Thom Jurek states "At nearly 74 minutes, this is a mammoth duet, or at least one would think so, but apparently not these two. Judging by the energy exerted at the end when compared to that at the beginning, they were just getting revved into action... This is a solid duet and an exciting one, despite its rather tense and minimal start".

The authors of The Penguin Guide to Jazz awarded the album 4 stars, and singled it out as one of the albums that are "particularly brilliant examples of Taylor's adaptive capabilities and his partners' own contributions".

== Track listing ==
All compositions by Cecil Taylor & Han Bennink.

1. "Spots, Circles, and Fantasy" - 73:44

- Recorded in Berlin on July 10, 1988

== Personnel ==
- Cecil Taylor: piano, voice
- Han Bennink: drums
