= Looking (Berlin Version) Corona =

Live album by Cecil Taylor
- Released: 1991
- Recorded: November 3–4, 1989
- Genre: Free jazz
- Length: 69:42
- Label: FMP

Cecil Taylor chronology
Looking (Berlin Version) The Feel Trio (1990)	Looking (Berlin Version) Corona (1991)	Celebrated Blazons (1993)

Professional ratings
Review scores
Source	Rating
Allmusic	4/5 stars
The Penguin Guide to Jazz Recordings	3.5/4 stars

Looking (Berlin Version) Corona is a live album featuring performances by Cecil Taylor with Harald Kimmig, Muneer Abdul Fataah, William Parker and Tony Oxley recorded in Berlin on November 3 & 4, 1989 and released on the FMP label.

== Reception ==
The Allmusic review by Brian Olewnick states "Recorded a couple of days after the similarly titled solo piano performance also released on FMP, Looking (Berlin Version) Corona is a fine quintet concert, notable for the relatively unusual (for Taylor) instrumental grouping employed... There's an enormous number of recordings from Taylor in the late '80s (much of it on FMP) and, while this may not rank at the very top of even that batch, it's a quite enjoyable release and one that the serious aficionado will want to hear".

== Track listing ==
All compositions by Cecil Taylor.

No.	Title	Length
1.	"First Movement"	60:15
2.	"Second Movement"	3:30
3.	"Third Movement"	7:30
Total length:		69:45

- Recorded at the Total Music Meeting, Quartier Latin, in Berlin, Germany on November 3 (tracks 2 & 3) & 4 (track 1), 1989

== Personnel ==
- Cecil Taylor – piano
- Harald Kimmig – violin
- Muneer Abdul Fataah – cello
- William Parker – double bass
- Tony Oxley – drums
