= Remembrance (Cecil Taylor and Louis Moholo album) =

Live album by Cecil Taylor and Louis Moholo
- Released: 1989
- Recorded: July 3, 1988
- Venue: Kongresshalle, Berlin
- Genre: Free jazz
- Label: FMP

Cecil Taylor chronology
Alms/Tiergarten (Spree) (1989)	Remembrance (1989)	Pleistozaen Mit Wasser (1989)

Remembrance is a live album featuring a performance by Cecil Taylor and Louis Moholo recorded in Berlin on July 3, 1988, as part of month-long series of concerts by Taylor and released on the FMP label.

== Reception ==
Professional ratings
Review scores
Source	Rating
Allmusic	4.5/5 stars
The Penguin Guide to Jazz Recordings	4/4 stars
The Virgin Encyclopedia of Jazz	4/5 stars

In the album liner notes, Steve Lake wrote: "In this concert... Louis [Moholo] resisted the straightforward options; he never met the force of the piano headon. Instead, he chose to detail the piano's sound, to detail it, colour and embellish it and speed it on its way. The result was a music subtly different from anything else in Taylor's discography. Outside of a laconic interlude with brushes, prompted by some wry Nichols-like chords, Moholo rarely played stressed rhythms but maintained a sense of perpetual motion with propellent broken pulses that shadowed the piano, raced it round labyrinthine corners and up the proud polished sides of its vortices. The drums' emphasis rippled outward from snare to cymbals, often very delicately, using the lightest of pressures. If a violent intensity was demanded, it was supplied, but never forced from Moholo's side. Through the drum sound, the gathering swirl of accents, the tiny cup-chimes of Moholo's hi-hat kept up a murmuring susurration, a purr of agreement. No matter how fast Taylor moved, how rapidly he fired off his 'unsimultaneous clusters', Moholo stayed with him, shoring up the sound."

The Allmusic review by Thom Jurek states that, of the music that Taylor performed during his stay in Berlin, "a very small amount was so brilliant it ranked near the pinnacle of his long and well-documented career. This date with South African drummer Louis Moholo is one such performance. The aggressive approaches used by both men to intricately weave patterns and tapestries of sound in order to turn it back on itself forms a common bond, and here are exploited to the maximum effect. This duet cannot be characterized in terms of pure dynamic force, however, as Taylor has rarely sounded so musical as he does here, with his deft use of arpeggio versus chromatic form, his overhand approach to both register and counterpoint, and his elongated legato phrasing (which one would believe to be the very extension of his breath if didn't go on so long). And Moholo is not merely an accompanist. He is rhythm itself; carved from the side of a rock in Southern Africa, he understands that rhythm is not only pulse -- it is song as well. Hence, on the two duets here, Moholo moves Taylor to concentrate on the "singing" aspect of his pianism, using slippery brushstrokes against the rims, careening rim shots with a pair of 1-S sticks, and flummoxing stretches of the bass drum that shimmer and shake Taylor's skittering skeins of angular rhythmic notes with stunning precision. There are few recordings like this one, which inspires even as it amazes the listener."

== Track listing ==
All compositions by Cecil Taylor & Louis Moholo except as indicated.

1. "Remembrance" - 40:29
2. "The Great Bear" - 21:20
3. "Stone" (Cecil Taylor) - 1:36

- Recorded in Berlin on July 3, 1988

== Personnel ==
- Cecil Taylor: piano, voice
- Louis Moholo: drums (tracks 1 & 2)
