= Dark to Themselves =

Live album by Cecil Taylor
- Released: 1977
- Recorded: June 18, 1976
- Venue: Ljubljana Jazz Festival, Yugoslavia
- Genre: Free jazz
- Length: 61:45
- Label: Inner City/Enja
- Producer: Matthias Winckelmann

Cecil Taylor chronology
Silent Tongues (1974)	Dark to Themselves (1977)	Air Above Mountains (1976)

Dark to Themselves is a live album by Cecil Taylor recorded at the Ljubljana Jazz Festival, Yugoslavia, on June 18, 1976, and released on the Enja label. The album features Taylor on piano with alto saxophonist Jimmy Lyons, tenor saxophonist David S. Ware, trumpeter Raphe Malik, and drummer Marc Edwards. (The album documents the only occasion on which Ware and Edwards recorded with Taylor.) The original LP release presented the music in edited form, while the CD reissue contains the complete performance, restoring sections that were previously excised.

The album liner notes feature Taylor's poem "Da", which was later reprinted in the collection Every Goodbye Ain't Gone. The liner notes also include the following statement by Taylor, taken from an interview with Joseph Chonto: "Music... is the force of nature which is what the sound is – the eternal sound. The beauty of whatever made those trees, those stones, the rivers... that is the living force I'm concerned with. That is the force that leaves me at those highest points of ecstasy... I'm trying to be in touch with and appreciative of... this day - the way the sky looked last night - extraordinary! ... The beautiful forces unleashed were not a manifestation of anger, but manifestations of the beauty of nature. What we try to do now is consciously bring the beauty of living experience and to share that."

== Reception ==
Professional ratings
Review scores
Source	Rating
Allmusic	4.5/5 stars
The Rolling Stone Jazz Record Guide	4/5 stars
The Penguin Guide to Jazz Recordings	3.5/4 stars

The Allmusic review by Scott Yanow awards the album 4.5 stars, stating: "Listeners with very open ears and longtime fans of Cecil Taylor can consider this explosive performance to be essential." The authors of the Penguin Guide to Jazz Recordings wrote: "More than in many of Taylor's concert recordings, the music here suggests not darkness but incandescence – the flaring trumpet of Malik has a prominent role in the first 20 minutes, and the brilliance of Taylor's playing in this section is radiant."

In a tribute to Taylor following the pianist's death, Howard Barnum called Dark to Themselves "a full-bore, hour-long exorcism and communal communion with the spirit world", and wrote: "If you are just trying to learn to dig Taylor for the first time, you might want to skip this, but not to go here or somewhere similar is not to give a full picture of Taylor... it has much to offer and is definitely pure, uncompromising Taylor." Writing for the Head Heritage web site, Dave Furgess commented: "Dark To Themselves... features a somewhat more structured and stable sound due to other musicians Taylor has brought to the table for the recording... I rate this right up there with John Coltrane's Live In Seattle for sheer gut-busting intensity... Play this at your next party and see how many people are left standing!"

== Track listing ==
All compositions by Cecil Taylor.

1. "Streams and Chorus of Seed" – 61:45

Original vinyl edition:
A. "Streams" - 23:00
B. "Chorus of Seed" - 26:12

== Personnel ==
- Cecil Taylor – piano
- Jimmy Lyons – alto saxophone
- Raphe Malik – trumpet
- David S. Ware – tenor saxophone
- Marc Edwards – drums
