= Iwontunwonsi =

Live album by Cecil Taylor
- Released: 1995
- Recorded: February 8, 1986
- Venue: Sweet Basil Jazz Club
- Genre: Free jazz
- Label: Sound Hills

Cecil Taylor chronology
Winged Serpent (Sliding Quadrants) (1984)	Iwontunwonsi (1995)	Amewa (1995)

Iwontunwonsi is a live album by pianist Cecil Taylor recorded at Sweet Basil Jazz Club in New York City, on February 8, 1986, and released on the Sound Hills label (Japan). The album features a solo performance by Taylor divided into three sections. Additional tracks from this concert were released on Amewa.

== Reception ==
Professional ratings
Review scores
Source	Rating
Allmusic	

A review at AllMusic states: "Taylor's concerts are a remarkable union of man and instrument... Paramount at all times is a sense of invention and exploration, Cecil surprising himself. The focus is unrelenting... The piano-playing here is only slightly less astonishing than that exhibited in his Herculean 1974 performance, Silent Tongues. But the structure and unity (who else can create such coherent, committed, large-scale structures?) are at least as remarkable. The audience brings Taylor back for an encore. He sits down and plays for a minute and a half: an after-dinner joke."

== Track listing ==
All compositions by Cecil Taylor.

1. "Iwontunwonsi, Part 1" - 3:28
2. "Iwontunwonsi, Part 2" - 43:50
3. "Iwontunwonsi, Part 3" - 1:37

- Recorded at Sweet Basil, New York City, on February 8, 1986

== Personnel ==
- Cecil Taylor: piano
