= Silent Tongues =

Live album by Cecil Taylor
- Released: 1975
- Recorded: July 2, 1974
- Venue: Montreux Jazz Festival, Switzerland
- Genre: Free jazz
- Length: 52:03
- Label: Freedom

Cecil Taylor chronology
Spring of Two Blue J's (1973)	Silent Tongues (1975)	Dark to Themselves (1976)

Silent Tongues is a live album by Cecil Taylor on solo piano recorded at the Montreux Jazz Festival in 1974. It features Taylor's five-movement work "Silent Tongues", along with two encores.

== Reception ==
Professional ratings
Review scores
Source	Rating
AllMusic	5/5 stars
The Rolling Stone Jazz Record Guide	5/5 stars

The AllMusic review by Scott Yanow stated: "To simplify in explaining what he was doing at this point of time, it can be said that Taylor essentially plays the piano like a drum set, creating percussive and thunderous sounds that are otherworldly and full of an impressive amount of energy and atonal ideas. Many listeners will find these performances to be quite difficult but it is worth the struggle to open up one's perceptions as to what music can be."

Silent Tongues was DownBeat's album of the year for 1975.

== Track listing ==
All compositions by Cecil Taylor

1. "Abyss (First Movement)"/"Petals and Filaments (Second Movement)"/"Jitney (Third Movement)" - 18:23
2. "Crossing Part 1 (Fourth Movement Part 1)" - 8:36
3. "Crossing Part 2 (Fourth Movement Part 2)" - 10:00
4. "After All (Fifth Movement)" - 9:59
5. "Jitney No. 2" - 4:11
6. "After All No. 2" - 2:50

- Recorded at Montreux on July 2, 1974

== Personnel ==
- Cecil Taylor – piano
