= For Olim =

Live album by Cecil Taylor
- Released: 1987
- Recorded: April 9, 1986
- Genre: Free jazz
- Length: 44:27
- Label: Soul Note

Cecil Taylor chronology
| Amewa (1986) | For Olim (1987) | Olu Iwa (1986) |

For Olim is a live album by Cecil Taylor recorded in Berlin, Germany on April 9, 1986, and released on the Soul Note label. The album features a solo concert performance by Taylor.

According to the liner notes, the word "Olim" is "an Aztec hieroglyph meaning movement, motion, earthquake." The album is dedicated "to the living Spirit of Jimmy Lyons," the alto saxophone player who worked with Taylor for roughly 25 years, and who died a little over a month after the recording of the album.

== Reception ==
Professional ratings
Review scores
| Source | Rating |
|---|---|
| AllMusic | 4.5/5 stars |
| The Penguin Guide to Jazz Recordings | 4/4 stars |

The Penguin Guide to Jazz selected this album as part of its suggested "Core Collection", stating that "nothing here does anything but speak directly to the attentive listener." The AllMusic review by Scott Yanow states: "One of Cecil Taylor's most satisfying solo concerts, this date features the always uncompromising and adventurous pianist exploring eight of his compositions, including a few that are quite brief (two are under two minutes). The difficult but lyrical live set rewards repeated listenings".

== Track listing ==
All compositions by Cecil Taylor.

1. "Olim" - 17:41
2. "Glossalalia Part Four" - 5:44
3. "Mirror and Water Gazing" - 4:01
4. "Living (Dedicated to Julian Beck)" - 6:59
5. "For the Death" - 1:33
6. "For the Rabbit" - 3:41
7. "For the Water Dog" - 1:44
8. "The Question" - 3:04
  - Recorded in Berlin, Germany, on April 9, 1986

== Personnel ==
- Cecil Taylor: piano
