= Celebrated Blazons =

Live album by Cecil Taylor
- Released: 1993
- Recorded: June 29, 1990
- Venue: Akademie der Künste, Berlin
- Genre: Free jazz
- Label: FMP
- Producer: Jost Gebers

Cecil Taylor chronology
Looking (Berlin Version) Corona (1991)	Celebrated Blazons (1993)	2 Ts for a Lovely T (1991)

Professional ratings
Review scores
Source	Rating
Allmusic	4.5/5 stars
The Penguin Guide to Jazz Recordings	4/4 stars

Celebrated Blazons is a live album featuring performances by Cecil Taylor with William Parker and Tony Oxley recorded at the Akademie der Künste in Berlin on June 29, 1990, and released on the FMP label.

== Reception ==
Reviewer Thom Jurek wrote, "This date was recorded at the 1990 Workshop of Free Music in Berlin, and the ensemble plays one long, 56-minute improvisation... as formidable players challenge and then unite with one another in a frenetic set of modes, tempos, and atmospheres until they reach a horizon, mutually agreed upon as a point of entering silence. Highly recommended". The authors of The Penguin Guide to Jazz wrote: "Oxley's drumming is a more European flavour than anything Taylor's other regular drummers have created, yet it only serves to emphasize the huge rhythmic resources of the leader's playing. Where [Andrew] Cyrille's magnificent breakers would sometimes obscure the keyboard, Oxley's playing – a unique blend of lumpen momentum and detailed percussive colour – reveals more of it. Parker, too, is coming into his own, deflecting off what the others do while speaking his piece. Nearly an hour of music, and, as long as one abandons any narrow construction of the term, it swings."

Michael Rosenstein wrote: "This release captures what has become his finest working trio of recent years... Though there are brief respites at about half, and again about two-thirds of the way through, the surging power of this performance is often unrelenting. This trio release is further proof of Taylor's genius and is a major addition to his phenomenal recent releases." Kevin Whitehead commented: "Oh my – should one listen to this as jazz? Mmmmm, no. They do slide in and out of swing time as they deal with rhythm in many dimensions, and the loosely structured improvising is hot and propulsive, but Oxley's clattering cracked-cymbal timbres don't lend themselves to ching-a-ching. So listen to it as you would rural blues: one phrase or stanza gives rise to the next, in stark stabbing sonorities, as time and form bend to accommodate a line. Do that and you won't get lost."

Brian Morton stated: "Celebrated Blazons is another of the great Taylor records, not least because it finds him working with a group... that unmistakably restores his jazz lineage, but takes it off on a rhythmic and harmonic axis at right angles to the classic Lyons/Cyrille partnership. Where Cyrille flowed like the Niger, Tony Oxley plays musical quanta, packets of metrical heat and light that are impossible to count and measure. Where the older group dispensed with a double bass, William Parker provides a rich accompaniment, the most resonant, symphonic playing since the heyday of Richard Davis, who was Eric Dolphy’s favorite bassist for a time"

== Track listing ==
All compositions by Cecil Taylor, William Parker & Tony Oxley.

1. "(3 in one)/Lords Of The House/Deep Water/Realm of the Wilds/3 in one" - 56:40
- Recorded at the Workshop Freie Musik 1986, Akademie der Künste in Berlin, Germany on June 29, 1990

== Personnel ==
- Cecil Taylor – piano
- William Parker – double bass
- Tony Oxley – drums
