= 2 Ts for a Lovely T =

Live album by Cecil Taylor
- Released: 2002
- Recorded: August 27 – September 1, 1990
- Venue: Ronnie Scott's Jazz Club, London
- Genre: Free jazz
- Label: Codanza Records

Cecil Taylor chronology
Celebrated Blazons (1993)	2 Ts for a Lovely T (2002)	Double Holy House (1993)

2 Ts for a Lovely T is a 10-CD limited-edition live album by American pianist Cecil Taylor. It was recorded during August 27 - September 1, 1990 at Ronnie Scott's Jazz Club in London, and was released in 2002 on the Codanza label. The album features the group known as the "Feel Trio," with Taylor on piano, William Parker on bass, and Tony Oxley on drums.

== Reception ==
Professional ratings
Review scores
Source	Rating
The Guardian	4/5 stars
The Penguin Guide to Jazz Recordings	4/4 stars

In a review for The Guardian, John Fordham wrote: "These sessions reveal the high-pressure intricacies of a Taylor improvisation with remarkable clarity. Oxley's flickering, clickety figures, tiny ringing sounds, tabla-like sonorities and shimmering splashes complement Parker's thick, pliable sound and impulsive ingenuity, and Taylor's headlong runs and fierce density are beautifully caught by the recording - it's like having a grand piano in your room, particularly with the muscularity of the instrument's bass register... The transparency of the sound enhances the differences of intensity and shape across these shows, though the set is intentionally a chronicle of the way a brilliant free-improvising ensemble works over a sustained period, rather than the interpretation of a repertoire. A very specialised item, certainly, but for Taylor disciples, and the more generally musically curious, it is breathtaking."

The authors of the Penguin Guide to Jazz Recordings wrote: "It's rare that Taylor has been documented at such length, and the results will repay study by all his admirers."

John Eyles, writing for All About Jazz, commented: "2 Ts for a Lovely T, recorded live during a 1990 five-night residency at Ronnie Scott's, London, benefits from its sheer scale and the group interactions it captured. When all three are playing flat-out at the same time, the results are simply breath-taking."

== Track listing ==
All compositions by Cecil Taylor.

Disc one

1. "Epicritic (Pertaining To Cutaneous Sensitivity) Part 1" – 42:29
2. "Epicritic (Pertaining To Cutaneous Sensitivity) Part 2" – 10:48

Disc two

1. "Peduncle (The Support Of An Inflorescence)" – 43:32

Disc three

1. "Logozo Scampers (Tortoise)" – 42:06

Disc four

1. "Owele Standing (Small Bird)" – 46:16

Disc five

1. "Pineal (Black Dot)" – 41:34

Disc six

1. "Proxumal (Nearest) Part 1" – 43:45
2. "Proxumal (Nearest) Part 2" – 1:48

Disc seven

1. "Tellurian (Pertaining To Earth Or Its Inhabitants)" – 32:10

Disc eight

1. "Alumo" – 43:55

Disc nine

1. "Tayassus Pecari" – 41:03

Disc ten

1. "Peat" – 36:24

Recorded during August 27 - September 1, 1990 at Ronnie Scott's Jazz Club, London.

== Personnel ==
- Cecil Taylor – piano
- William Parker – bass
- Tony Oxley – drums
