= Looking Ahead! =

Studio album by Cecil Taylor
- Released: 1959
- Recorded: June 9, 1958
- Genres: Post-bop; avant-garde jazz
- Length: 41:47
- Label: Contemporary

Cecil Taylor chronology
At Newport (1958)	Looking Ahead! (1959)	Stereo Drive (1959)

Professional ratings
Review scores
Source	Rating
AllMusic	4.5/5 stars
The Penguin Guide to Jazz Recordings	3.5/4 stars
The Rolling Stone Jazz Record Guide	4/5 stars

Looking Ahead! is the second studio album by the American jazz pianist Cecil Taylor, recorded for Contemporary Records in June 1958 and released the following year. The album features bassist Buell Neidlinger, drummer Denis Charles, and vibraphonist Earl Griffith.

== Reception ==
The AllMusic review by Brian Olewnick calls Looking Ahead! "an amazing document of a talent fairly straining at the reins, a meteor about to burst onto the jazz scene and render it forever changed...a vital recording from the nascence of one of the towering geniuses of modern music [that] belongs in any jazz fan's collection".

The authors of The Penguin Guide to Jazz deemed it "the most pensive of Taylor's early recordings" and "the best place to start in appreciating his music," noting that "Toll" "embarks on a new journey towards his own territory."

While a student at Syracuse University, Lou Reed hosted a radio show on WAER titled "Excursions on a Wobbly Rail" after the track "Excursion on a Wobbly Rail".

== Track listing ==
All compositions by Cecil Tayor except as indicated

1. "Luyah! The Glorious Step" - 6:25
2. "African Violets" (Earl Griffith, Taylor) - 5:12
3. "Of What" - 8:18
4. "Wallering" - 5:22
5. "Toll" - 7:38
6. "Excursion on a Wobbly Rail" - 9:04

- Recorded at Nola's Penthouse Studios, New York City, on June 9, 1958

== Personnel ==
- Cecil Taylor - piano
- Buell Neidlinger - double bass
- Denis Charles - drums
- Earl Griffith - vibraphone
