= Legba Crossing =

Live album by Cecil Taylor
- Released: 1989
- Recorded: July 15, 1988
- Venue: Kongresshalle, Berlin
- Genre: Free jazz
- Length: 48:15
- Label: FMP
- Producer: Jost Gebers

Cecil Taylor chronology
Spots, Circles, and Fantasy (1989)	Legba Crossing (1989)	Erzulie Maketh Scent (1989)

Legba Crossing is a live album featuring a performance by Cecil Taylor's Workshop Ensemble recorded in Berlin on July 15, 1988 as part of month-long series of concerts by Taylor and released on the FMP label. Taylor did not play the piano on this album, but instead directed the ensemble and contributed vocalizations.

On the album, Taylor guided a group of 13 musicians through his challenging score, yielding "such a music that at every instant a oneness, a shifting feeling of coherence remains distinct that, especially in the processes of free jazz, is so easily abandoned in favour of a destructive type of playing or solo eruptions, or grating conversations, or minimalistic 'coasting'." Saxophonist Biggi Vinkeloe, a participant in the session, recalled: "I know that many people thought that it was organized chaos... It was extremely precise, and he had incredible ears."

== Reception ==
Professional ratings
Review scores
Source	Rating
Allmusic	4/5 stars
The Penguin Guide to Jazz Recordings	3/4 stars
The Virgin Encyclopedia of Jazz	4/5 stars

The Allmusic review by Thom Jurek states "Legba Crossing is a conceptual work, built from ground up, utilizing specifically the considerable young talent he had in front of him. The piece is not the careening, chaotic, free for all one might expect. There is a dynamic and dramatic control Taylor has over the entire ensemble. There are numerous vocalists who pipe in strange poetry and lyrics amid a wash of strings and winds. The reeds and percussion hold forth not as solo instruments so much but as spiritual mainstays, keeping the music rooted in a kind of jazz that hadn't been heard even in Europe for a very long time... This music is moving, full of pathos and emotion, but also nuance and figurative speech in both voice and instrumental utterance... Though it is thoroughly outside in terms of presentation and execution, it is also penetrable and spiritually uplifting... it becomes obvious that Taylor, for once, is attempting to share his musical and social iconography with the rest of us. What a treat.".

Steve Vickery, writing for Coda, commented: "The ensemble's performance of Legba Crossing makes for an interesting test of young players' abilities to adapt to a score that is only partly fleshed out, and requires that their interpretive skills be finely tuned. All in all, they make a good reading of a tough piece, with the soloists and ensemble members featured in the recording making use of the same techniques that Taylor employs in the European Orchestra arrangements. This is not a student recital piece written for the half holiday parents' visit! The devices that this score calls for are demanding to the most seasoned players and the finished piece represented here is very strong. Voice work, performers dividing the responsibilities of free and composed sections of the score, soloist / ensemble settings of complex tonal / rhythmic parts, and the use of unconventional instrumental techniques are among the demands that this score made. A substantial performance."

In an article for Pitchfork, Seth Colter Walls wrote: "There are passages of collective squall here, but in its best moments, you can hear a sense of dawning discovery, as subsections of the group try out Taylor's serpentine motifs and steadily gain control over them before individual players dare to contribute fluttering improvisations. The takeaway here is that, in contrast with his often lightning-fast pianist playing, Taylor the chamber-music composer has a taste for long, sustained tones, which might entice fans of drone artists like David First (who actually spent some time playing in one of Taylor’s early '70s groups)."

== Track listing ==
Composition by Cecil Taylor.

1. "Legba Crossing" - 48:15

- Recorded in Berlin on July 15, 1988

== Personnel ==
- Cecil Taylor: director, voice
- Sabine Kopf: flute
- Daniel Werts: oboe
- Brigitte Vinkeloe: alto saxophone, soprano saxophone, flute
- Joachim Gies: alto saxophone
- Ove Volquartz: soprano saxophone, tenor saxophone, bass clarinet
- Heinz-Erich Godecke: trombone
- Harald Kimmig: violin
- Alexander Frangenheim, Uwe Martin, Georg Wolf: bass
- Paul Plimley: piano
- Lukas Lindenmaier, Peeter Uuskyla: drums
- Trudy Morse: voice
