= Stereo Drive =

Studio album by Cecil Taylor
- Released: 1959
- Recorded: October 13, 1958; New York City
- Genre: Jazz
- Length: 33:35
- Label: United Artists; Blue Note
- Producer: Tom Wilson

Cecil Taylor chronology
Looking Ahead! (1958)	Stereo Drive (1959)	Love for Sale (1959)

Stereo Drive is an album by jazz musician Cecil Taylor featuring John Coltrane. It was released in 1959 on United Artists Records, with catalogue UAS 5014 for the stereo edition. The mono edition was issued as UAL 4014 with the title Hard Driving Jazz credited to The Cecil Taylor Quintet, and later reissued under Coltrane's name in 1962 as Coltrane Time (UAJS 15001). Compact disc reissues appeared on the Blue Note Records label credited to Coltrane. It is the only known recording featuring both Coltrane and Taylor.

Taylor has described how the record company determined the choice of musicians on the session: "I said 'Coltrane okay, but I want to use all the musicians that I want.' I wanted to use Ted Curson, who's a much more contemporary trumpet player than the trumpet player I ended up with, Kenny Dorham." Relations were strained between Taylor, who favoured a very avant-garde approach, and Dorham, who verbally disapproved of Taylor's "way-out" tendencies.

== Reception ==
Professional ratings
Review scores
Source	Rating
AllMusic	4/5 stars
The Penguin Guide to Jazz Recordings	3/4 stars

In a review for AllMusic, Scott Yanow wrote: "Although Taylor and John Coltrane got along well, trumpeter Kenny Dorham... hated the avant-garde pianist's playing and was clearly bothered by Taylor's dissonant comping behind his solos. With bassist Chuck Israels and drummer Louis Hayes doing their best to ignore the discord, the group manages to perform two blues and two standards with Dorham playing strictly bop, Taylor coming up with fairly free abstractions, and Coltrane sounding somewhere in between. The results are unintentionally fascinating."

The authors of The Penguin Guide to Jazz wrote that the session's "importance... is the unique opportunity to hear two of the great modernist pioneers together." However, "Unfortunately, they seem to cancel one another out. Both are playing rather circumspectly, perhaps in deference to the other, and the real star of the session... turns out to be Israels."

== Track listing ==
1. "Shifting Down" (Dorham) — 10:43
2. "Just Friends" (John Klenner, Lewis) — 6:17
3. "Like Someone in Love" (Van Heusen, Burke) — 8:13
4. "Double Clutching" (Israels) — 8:18

== Personnel ==
- Cecil Taylor — piano
- Kenny Dorham — trumpet
- John Coltrane — tenor saxophone
- Chuck Israels — bass
- Louis Hayes — drums
