= Erzulie Maketh Scent =

Live album by Cecil Taylor
- Released: 1989
- Recorded: July 16, 1988
- Venue: Kongresshalle, Berlin
- Genre: Free jazz
- Label: FMP
- Producer: Jost Gebers

Cecil Taylor chronology
Legba Crossing (1989)	Erzulie Maketh Scent (1989)	Leaf Palm Hand (1989)

Erzulie Maketh Scent is a live album featuring a solo performance by pianist Cecil Taylor recorded in Berlin on July 16, 1988 as part of month-long series of concerts by Taylor and released on the FMP label.

In the album liner notes, Bert Noglik described the music as "something like a resume of the different musical sides of Cecil Taylor. A music full of determination and at the same time (despite the cliché) extraordinarily gentle. Nowadays he plays more from 'a feeling of joy', Taylor had confessed to me. On the question of fantasy, Taylor talked about Magic. Here at least the terms interlock: Magic is to be found in the essence of fantasy. Cecil Taylor has said that improvisation represent the raising of Man's spiritual capacities, in the trance state. This state, which exists outside the bounds of 'reason' does not mean a reduction in, but an intensification of one's capacity for awareness. The Berlin concert gave such an idea. Clarity, the feeling of something glimmering, integrity. All this may sound a bit euphoric, requiring some additional explanation: It is the music that stands out, no ideology, no personality cult, no over-interpreted idea, no New-Age."

== Reception ==
Professional ratings
Review scores
Source	Rating
Allmusic	4.5/5 stars
The Penguin Guide to Jazz	4/4 stars

The Allmusic review by Thom Jurek states "This solo concert, performed on the second to last day of a monthlong stay in Berlin in which Taylor performed in every conceivable setting, is perhaps the most satisfying of his recording career. Taylor's many influences, interests, and obsessions are engaged here: They are mused upon, debated, and underscored for emphasis. His exploratory range has never been greater than it is on this three-part set, with two short and very delightful "songs" tagged on at the end. Taylor's sense of playfulness seldom comes through in his solo work, and this piece is full of it. Here is the place where the man truly lives as an artist... Of all the solo work Taylor did in the '80s — and there was plenty — this is the one to own. Go ahead. Be amazed".

== Track listing ==
All compositions by Cecil Taylor.

1. "Erzulie Maketh Scent Part 1" - 33:15
2. "Erzulie Maketh Scent Part 2" - 22:06
3. "Erzulie Maketh Scent Part 3" - 16:46
4. "Water" - 1:33
5. "Stone" - 1:03
  - Recorded in Berlin on July 16, 1988

== Personnel ==
- Cecil Taylor – piano
