= Ailanthus/Altissima: Bilateral Dimensions of 2 Root Songs =

Live album by Cecil Taylor and Tony Oxley
- Released: 2010
- Recorded: November 6 & 9, 2008
- Venue: The Village Vanguard, New York City
- Genre: Free jazz
- Label: Triple Point Records; TPR 037

Ailanthus/Altissima: Bilateral Dimensions of 2 Root Songs is a live album by pianist Cecil Taylor and drummer Tony Oxley. It was recorded at the Village Vanguard in New York City on November 6 and 9, 2008, and was released in limited quantities as a double LP set by Triple Point Records in 2010.

The album commemorated Taylor's 80th birthday and Oxley's 70th, as well as the 20th anniversary of the pair's first musical encounter in 1988 in Berlin, and includes a booklet featuring Taylor's poetry and reproductions of Oxley's paintings. The recordings were selected by the musicians from ten hours of material.

== Reception ==
Professional ratings
Review scores
Source	Rating
DownBeat	4/5 stars
Tom Hull – on the Web	B+
The Absolute Sound	4/5 stars

In a review for DownBeat, Peter Margasak wrote: "Despite their ages... the performances here reveal undiminished powers, and while the pianist generally eschews his most volcanic machinations, there's nothing remotely relaxed about these performances... Although the intensity ebbs and flows, the duo never engages in simple acceleration and deceleration; instead, Taylor is forever looking on the horizon, pushing the music into consistently new terrain, and while his language and phrasing may be familiar here, his drive and invention sounds as fresh and vital as anything he's done in decades. A late-career gem."

John Corbett commented: "their dialogue is particularly direct and intimate, the percussionist often anticipating the pianist's next move or vice versa. Indeed, there's a yin-yang quality about the duo. Ailanthus/Altissima is subtitled 'bilateral dimensions of 2 root songs,' and if you follow the music carefully, you can hear how the song basis of Taylor's music is, indeed, at the root, spreading out in this case in (at least) two directions. As ferocious as his music is, you can often find sections to hum along with, little thematic segments that stick in the brain. There is plenty of aggressive free music here, but also these pensive moments of quiet and extreme tension, a Taylor specialty."

Writing for Burning Ambulance, Phil Freeman stated: "there really is a surprising amount of genuine interplay on these two slabs. A lot of it is Oxley responding to Taylor's melodic and structural provocations—hammering the kit as the pianist hammers the keys, throwing evocative little phrases in when the older man... gets quiet—but there are many moments when Taylor, too, seems to be really listening to his partner." He concluded by writing that the duo made "intensely involving music, and this is a superb example."

In a review for The Absolute Sound, Duck Baker remarked: "Taylor virtually assaults the keyboard to produce a volcanic flow of cascading, criss-crossing lines, which leave the listener all but exhausted. But in recent years he has shown much more willingness to interject space and even a rhapsodic lyricism into his improvisations. This tendency allows Oxley to really prove his worth, and he reacts and responds to, and anticipates the pianist in what is more collaboration than accompaniment."

== Track listing ==
=== Disc 1: Ailanthus ===
1. "Untitled" – 23:09
2. "Untitled" – 5:02
3. "Untitled" – 12:36

=== Disc 2: Altissima ===
1. "Untitled" – 10:37
2. "Untitled" – 9:51
3. "Untitled" – 12:24
4. "Untitled" – 9:56

== Personnel ==
- Cecil Taylor – piano
- Tony Oxley – drums
