= At Newport (Cecil Taylor and Gigi Gryce album) =

1958 live jazz album

Live album by The Gigi Gryce–Donald Byrd Jazz Laboratory and The Cecil Taylor Quartet
- Released: 1958
- Recorded: July 5–6, 1957
- Genre: Jazz
- Label: Verve

Cecil Taylor chronology
Jazz Advance (1956)	At Newport (1958)	Looking Ahead! (1959)

Professional ratings
Review scores
Source	Rating
AllMusic	4/5 stars
Disc	3.5/5 stars
The Rolling Stone Jazz Record Guide	4/5 stars

At Newport is a live album by the Gigi Gryce–Donald Byrd Jazz Laboratory and the Cecil Taylor Quartet recorded for the Verve label at the Newport Jazz Festival in July 1957. The original LP album featured one side of performances by Taylor with Buell Neidlinger, Denis Charles and Steve Lacy and the other by Gryce, Byrd, Hank Jones, Wendell Marshall, and Osie Johnson.

== Reception ==
The AllMusic review by Ken Dryden states: "At first combining a set by Cecil Taylor with another by the Gigi Gryce-Donald Byrd Jazz Laboratory seems like an odd pairing, but it ends up working rather well. These live recordings, which come from the 1957 Newport Jazz Festival, have stood the test of time rather well."

== Track listing ==
The Cecil Taylor Quartet:

1. "Johnny Come Lately" (Billy Strayhorn) - 7:13
2. "Nona's Blues" (Cecil Taylor) - 7:40
3. "Tune 2" (Taylor) - 10:26

The Gigi Gryce-Donald Byrd Jazz Laboratory:

1. "Splittin' (Ray's Way)" (Ray Bryant) - 8:32
2. "Batland" (Lee Sears) - 7:21
3. "Love for Sale" (Cole Porter) - 7:34
- Recorded at the Newport Jazz Festival on July 5 (tracks 4–6) and 6 (tracks 1–3), 1957

== Personnel ==
- Cecil Taylor - piano (tracks 1–3)
- Steve Lacy - soprano saxophone (tracks 1–3)
- Buell Neidlinger - bass (tracks 1–3)
- Denis Charles - drums (tracks 1–3)
- Gigi Gryce - alto saxophone (tracks 4–6)
- Donald Byrd - trumpet (tracks 4–6)
- Hank Jones - piano (tracks 4–6)
- Wendell Marshall - bass (tracks 4–6)
- Osie Johnson - drums (tracks 4–6)
