= Looking (Berlin Version) The Feel Trio =

Live album by Cecil Taylor
- Released: 1990
- Recorded: November 2, 1989
- Genre: Free jazz
- Label: FMP

Cecil Taylor chronology
Looking (Berlin Version) Solo (1990)	Looking (Berlin Version) The Feel Trio (1990)	Looking (Berlin Version) Corona (1991)

Looking (Berlin Version) The Feel Trio is a live album featuring performances by Cecil Taylor with William Parker and Tony Oxley recorded in Berlin on November 2, 1989, and released on the FMP label.

== Reception ==
Professional ratings
Review scores
Source	Rating
AllMusic	4.5/5 stars
The Penguin Guide to Jazz Recordings	4/4 stars
The Virgin Encyclopedia of Jazz	4/5 stars

The AllMusic review by Brian Olewnick states "After its members had played together sporadically over the previous couple of years, the Feel Trio was a working group, and the empathy and instinct provided by that luxury is certainly in evidence here... The listener is treated to, and hopefully moved by, the sound of something being born, coming from silence, and an hour later returning there somehow — making it even bigger, more cavernous, and colorful as a result of this trio's awesome creation".

== Track listing ==
All compositions by Cecil Taylor, William Parker & Tony Oxley.

1. "First Part" - 36:22
2. "Second Part" - 5:05
3. "Third Part" - 30:49

- Recorded at the Total Music Meeting, Quartier Latin, in Berlin, Germany on November 2, 1989

== Personnel ==
- Cecil Taylor: piano
- William Parker: double bass
- Tony Oxley: drums
