= Momentum Space =

Studio album by Dewey Redman, Cecil Taylor and Elvin Jones
- Released: 1999
- Recorded: August 4–5, 1998
- Genre: Jazz
- Length: 60:00
- Label: Verve
- Producer: John Snyder

Dewey Redman chronology
In London (1996)	Momentum Space (1999)

Cecil Taylor chronology
Qu'a: Live at the Iridium (1998)	Momentum Space (1999)	Algonquin (2004)

Elvin Jones chronology
It Don't Mean a Thing (1994)	Momentum Space (1999)	The Truth: Heard Live at the Blue Note (2004)

Momentum Space is an album by American jazz saxophonist Dewey Redman, pianist Cecil Taylor and drummer Elvin Jones, recorded in 1998 and released on the Verve label.

== Reception ==
Professional ratings
Review scores
Source	Rating
AllMusic	3/5 stars

The AllMusic review by Scott Yanow stated, "The music is unpredictable yet not all that unique or colorful and one's expectations for a truly classic affair are not quite reached. This is worth listening to, but is not essential except as a historical curiosity".

Gary Giddins wrote: "This is a considered, committed album—not an autumnal all-star caucus like the Giants of Jazz in the '70s, but a unique and artful collaboration. Even if the music and conceptual organization were less remarkable, this disc would be one for the books."

Writing for All About Jazz, Craig Jolley called the album "a major statement", and commented: "All three major voices influence its sound directly (Taylor) or through collaborators. Participation varies from track to track. Each musician has a solo tune, there are two duets, and all three play on the two longest tunes... The music itself is completely free with no pre-conceived composition, key, or rhythm. Ebb and flow is determined by the players and centers around the rhythm of the moment. Several ambiguously defined themes come and go, most of which seem to emanate from Taylor but become common property."

== Track listing ==
All compositions by Dewey Redman except as indicated

1. "Nine" - 10:52
2. "Bekei" (Elvin Jones) - 4:19
3. "Spoonin'" - 7:27
4. "Life as..." (Cecil Taylor) - 8:31
5. "It" (Taylor) - 7:15
6. "Is" (Taylor) - 20:47
7. "Dew" - 0:49

- Recorded at Avatar Recording Studio, New York, New York, on August 4 & 5, 1998

== Personnel ==
- Dewey Redman - tenor saxophone (tracks 1, 3 & 5–7)
- Cecil Taylor - piano (tracks 1 & 4–6)
- Elvin Jones - drums (tracks 1–3 & 6)
