= Jazz Jamboree =

Music festival in Warsaw, Poland

The Jazz Jamboree Festival, simply known as Jazz Jamboree, is one of the largest and oldest jazz festivals in Europe, and takes place in Warsaw, the capital of Poland.

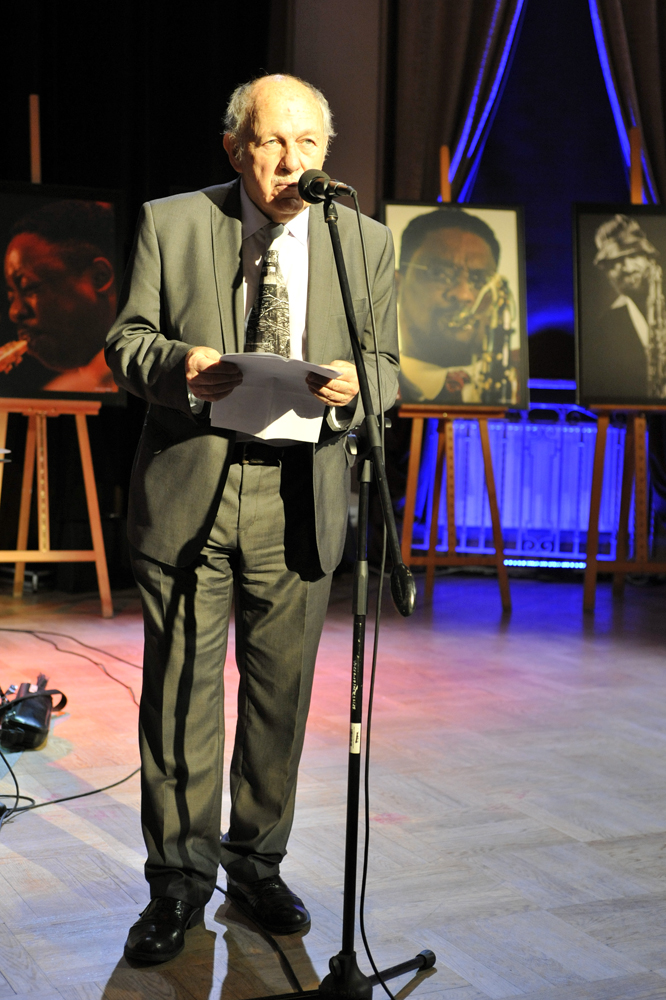
Musician Krzysztof Sadowski announces one of the concerts of the 55th Jazz Jamboree Festival in Warszawa, Poland. December 8th, 2013

== History ==
The first Jazz Jamboree was organised by the Hybrydy hot-club. It was three days long (18 to 21 September 1958) and it was called "Jazz 58". The first three editions of the festival took place in the student club Stodoła (with some of the concerts in Kraków). Then the venue was changed to Filharmonia Narodowa, and since 1965 all editions have taken place in Sala Kongresowa in the Palace of Culture and Science in Warsaw.

The name "Jazz Jamboree" was coined by Leopold Tyrmand.

The Jazz Jamboree Foundation was the festival's long-time organizer. Since 2017, it has been the Jazzarium Foundation.
