= Praxis (album) =

Live album by Cecil Taylor
- Released: 1982
- Recorded: July 1968
- Genre: Free jazz
- Length: 76:06
- Label: Praxis

Cecil Taylor chronology
Communications (1966)	Praxis (1982)	The Great Concert of Cecil Taylor (1969)

Praxis is a live album by Cecil Taylor recorded in Italy in July 1968 and released on the Greek Praxis label as a double LP. It features the first solo piano performance released by Taylor but has yet to be released on CD.

== Track listing ==
All compositions by Cecil Taylor.

1. "Praxis, Part I" - 18:37
2. "Praxis, Part II" - 19:14
3. "Praxis, Part III" - 19:15
4. "Praxis, Part IV" - 19:00

- Recorded in Italy in July 1968

== Personnel ==
- Cecil Taylor – piano
