= Downtown Music Gallery =

Record store in New York City

Coordinates: 40.711563°N 73.99589°W

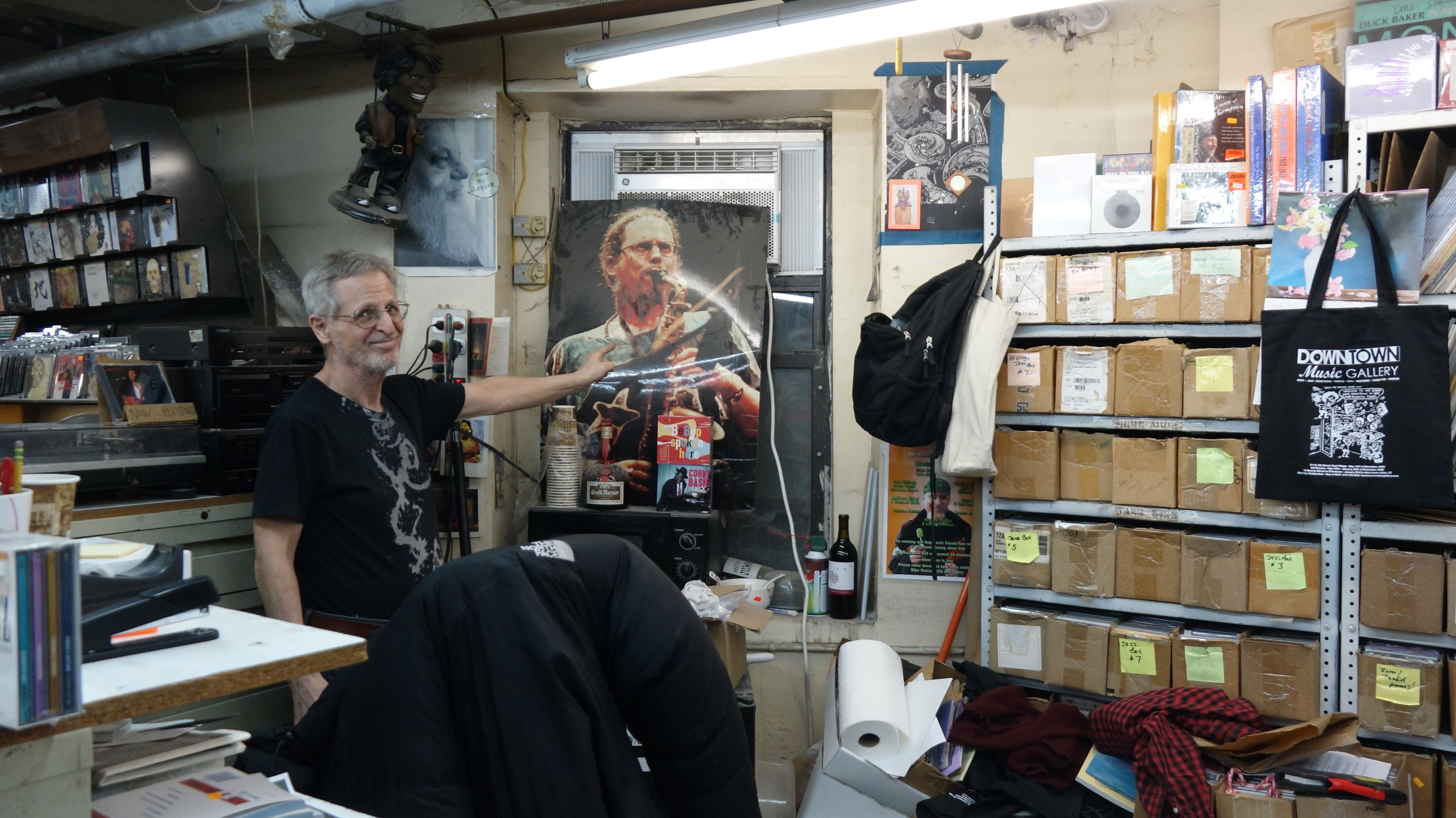
founder Bruce Lee Gallanter at Downtown Music Gallery in 2025

Downtown Music Gallery (DMG) is a long-running, internationally-known record store, mail-order, and performance space located in New York City. It specializes in downtown music, a recognized catchphrase for avant-garde jazz and contemporary composition, experimental, and improvisational music from around the world. It was founded in May 1991 by David Yamner, Stephen Popkin and Bruce Lee Gallanter.

DMG was originally located in the East Village, at 211 East 5th Street for the first ten years of its existence, followed by seven years at 342 Bowery. It is currently located in Two Bridges, at 13 Monroe Street. Bruce Lee Gallanter, the co-founder, and Emanuel 'MannyLunch' Maris, formerly the owner of Lunch For Your Ears, run the shop.

The store also devotes an entire 700-CD display to John Zorn's Tzadik label, as it also operates the mail-fulfillment for the label. DMG features in-store live performances for free every Sunday night, and on other nights for special occasions. DMG also provides the telephone information service for The Stone performance space, founded 2005.
