= Ken Filiano =

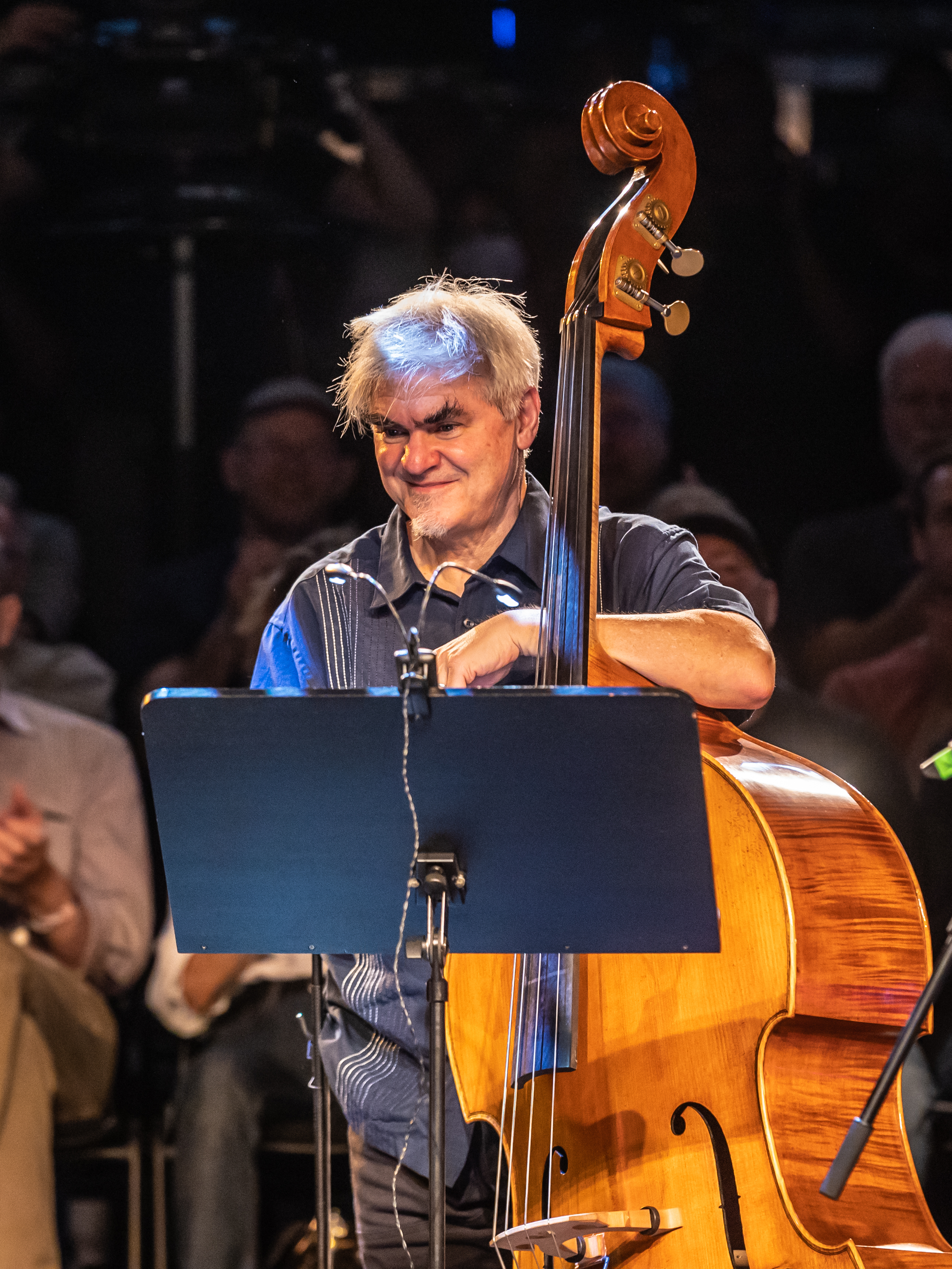
- Ken Filiano at the Moers Festival 2022

Background information
- Born: October 27, 1952 (age 73); Patchogue, New York, U.S.
- Genres: Jazz, avant-garde jazz
- Occupation: Musician
- Instrument: Double bass
- Years active: 1980–present
- Labels: Nine Winds, CIMP, Knitting Factory, Mode, Clean Feed

Ken Filiano (born 1952) is an American jazz and orchestral bassist based in Brooklyn, New York.

Since the 1970s, Filiano has played or recorded with Anthony Braxton, Fred Ho, Nels Cline, Bill Dixon, Fay Victor, and others. Filiano is on the teaching roster at the New School in New York. He teaches master classes in bass and improvisation and has a private studio in Brooklyn.

== Music career ==
=== Early life and education ===
Filiano was born in Patchogue, New York. He began playing trumpet as a child and continued to play the instrument while attending Syracuse University and studying with Rudolf Nashan. Nearing the end of his undergraduate work, Filiano decided to switch to bass and study with V. Stewart Wheeler. He received a Bachelor of Music in Double Bass from Syracuse University in 1978.

Filiano did graduate work at the University of Southern California in the late 1980s before eventually receiving a Master of Music in Double Bass from Rutgers University in 1997. While at Rutgers, he studied with bassists Carolyn Davis, John Feeney, and Larry Ridley, as well as with Ted Dunbar, Kenny Barron, Ralph Bowen, and Daniel Goode.

=== Performing and recording ===
Filiano began his professional career in 1974, working across the Northeastern United States from his home base in Syracuse, New York. From 1975-76 he was the principal bassist in the Syracuse University Orchestra.

As the decade began, Filiano lived in Boston. From 1980-83 he was a member of the Search quartet, performing and giving master classes sponsored by the Performing Artist Association of New England. In 1983, Filiano relocated to Los Angeles, California. He began to work as a freelance bassist in classical recording studios and on the jazz scene. He formed a relationship with multi-instrumentalist Vinny Golia, with whom he toured North America and Europe throughout the 1980s.

Filiano made his jazz album debut in 1985, appearing on recordings by Golia and Arni Cheatham. In the second half of the decade, he recorded with Richard Grossman, Steve Adams and Kim Richmond. Filiano also performed in numerous classical concerts, both solo and in chamber ensembles, in the Los Angeles area, including performances of "'L'Histoire du Soldat' and the Dvorak Quintet, along with premieres of new works for contrabass by Yu-Chin Quo and John Kennedy.

The 90s were a fertile recording period for Filiano, who appeared on more than 50 albums with Golia, Grossman, Adams, Tony Lujan, Anthony Coleman, Hafez Modirzadeh, Bill Perkins, Joelle Leandre and many others.

Filiano performed around North America, Europe, and Japan, including at the Bergamo Jazz Festival (Italy), the Du Maurier Atlantic Jazz Festival (Canada), the Tampere International Jazz Festival (Finland), the Texaco New York Jazz Festival, and at the Blue Note in Fukuoka, Japan. He also performed classical and tango music, including touring Germany with the Giora Feidman Ensemble, performing duo concerts for cello and contrabass, playing with the New York/Buenos Aires Connection at the Hollywood Bowl, and premiering a solo bass work, 'Yauchzen', by composer Kitty Brazelton.

As the 21st century began, Filiano increased his busy recording and touring schedule, appearing on more than 70 albums. In addition to his continuing relationships from the 90s, he added performances and recordings with Dom Minasi, Fred Hess, Roswell Rudd, Paul Smoker, Rodrigo Amado, Andrea Wolper, Jason Kao Hwang, Marco Cappelli, and many others. He continued to perform at many of the premier clubs and festivals around the world, including at the Knitting Factory, the Bell Atlantic Jazz Festival (New York), Merkin Concert Hall (New York), the JVC Jazz Festival (New York), the Jazz ao Centro Festival (Portugal), the Cape Verde International Jazz Festival, the Vancouver International Jazz Festival, and others. He played with several tango ensembles. His classical work included performances with the Manhattan Chamber Orchestra, the Princeton Chamber Orchestra, and the Sirius String Quartet.

Filiano has appeared on more than a dozen recordings since the start of the new decade, including on trumpeter Bill Dixon’s final recording, 'Envoi', and on albums with Anthony Braxton, Connie Crothers, Taylor Ho Bynum, Nate Wooley and Anders Nilsson, among others. Filiano has performed at festivals and clubs around the world, including in the United States, Canada, Slovenia, Italy, Germany, France, and Russia.

=== Teaching ===
Filiano has been teaching bass since 1980, both privately and at colleges and universities. He’s also taught at Mansfield University, Rutgers University, Hunter College and the University of Southern California.

== Discography ==
2011

- Bill Dixon, Envoi (Victo)
- Anthony Braxton, Trillium E
- Connie Crothers Quartet, Connie Crothers Quartet + Mark Weber: Live at the Stone
- Connie Crothers Quintet, Band of Fire
- Andrea Wolper, Parallel Lives
- Jason Kao Hwang & Edge, Crossroads Unseen
- Jason Kao Hwang & Spontaneous River, Symphony of Souls
- Vinny Golia Quartet, Take Your Time (Relative Pitch)
- Taylor Ho Bynum Sextet, Apparent Distance
- Stephen Gauci Quartet, CIMPFest: Live in Villach 2009

2010

- Ken Filiano & Quantum Entanglements, Dreams from a Clown Car (Clean Feed)
- Nate Wooley + Taylor Ho Bynum, The Throes, (CIMP)
- Marco Cappelli Acoustic Trio, Les Nuages en France, (Avant)
- Fred Hess Big Band, Into the Open
- Steve Adams Trio, Surface Tension, (Clean Feed)
- Anders Nilsson, Aorta Ensemble (KOPACD)

2009

- Marilyn Lerner/Ken Filiano/Lou Grassi, Arms Spread Wide (NoBusiness)
- Bill Dixon, Tapestries for Small Orchestra
- Fred Hess Big Band, Hold On (Dazzle)
- Fay Victor Ensemble, The Freesong Suite (Greene Avenue Music)
- Dom Minasi, Dissonance Makes the Heart Grow Fonder

2008

- M. Marucci & D. Webb Trio feat. Ken Filiano, Changeup (CIMP)
- Jim McCauley, The Ultimate Frog (Drip Audio)
- The Fred Hess Band, Single Moment (Alison)
- Jessica Jones Qt., Word
- Marco Cappelli, Italian Doc Remix (ITN)
- Richard Thompson, Swing Low, Sweet Chariot

2007

- ESATrio: Bill Gagliardi, Ken Filiano, Lou Grassi, kenbillou (CIMP)
- Fay Victor Quartet, Cartwheels Through the Cosmos
- M. Marucci & D. Webb Trio feat. Ken Filiano, Three the Hard Way (CIMP)
- Stephen Gauci Quartet, Wisps of an Unknown Face (CIMP)
- Saco Yasuma, Another Rain
- Anthony Coleman, Lapidation (New World)
- Paul Smoker/Damon Short Quintet, No Stock Options
- Jason Kao Hwang, Stories Before Within (Innova)
- Tomas Janzon, Coast to Coast to Coast (Changes Music)
- Chris Chalfant, Book of Unstandards (Jyaku Sound)
- Fred Hess, In the Grotto (Alison)
- Alipio C Neto, The Perfume Comes Before the Flower (Clean Feed)
- TECK String Quartet (CleanFeed)
- Sebastian Schunke Meets Olvido, Vida Pura (Timba)
- Evil Eye, Doin' It All For My Baby (KMB Jazz)
- Jon Hemmersam/Dom Minasi Quartet (CDM)
- Rodrigo Amido, Surface (European Echoes)

2006

- Ken Filiano/Bonnie Barnett Duo, Trio for Two
- Ken Filiano, Steve Adams, The Other Side of This (Clean Feed)
- Dom Minasi, The Vampire’s Revenge (CDM)
- Jason Kao Hwang, Edge
- Adam Caine Trio, Pipe
- Fred Hess Quartet, How 'Bout Now (Tapestry)
- Richard Thompson, Poetry Prelude (Videmus)
- Stephen Gauci Qt., Absolutely, Absolutely (CIMP)

2005

- Ken Wessel, Jawboning (CIMP)
- Andrea Wolper, The Small Hours (Varisone Jazz)
- Dennis González’s Spirit Meridian, Idle Wild (Clean Feed)
- David Taylor/Steve Swell Quintet, Not Just (CIMP)
- Vinny Golia Quartet, Sfumato (Clean Feed)
- Julia Doszna, Immigrant/Emirpaht (American Historical Recordings)

2004

- LIP Improvisation Players, Motion (Clean Feed)
- Dom Minasi’s DDT+2, Time Will Tell (CDM)
- Carol Mennie, I’m Not a Sometime Thing (CDM)
- Lou Grassi Quartet, Avanti Galoppi (CIMP)
- Jessica Jones Quartet, Nod (New Artists)
- Bob Feldman Trio, Triplicity (One Soul)
- Fred Hess Quartet, Crossed Paths (Tapestry)
- ROVA:ORKESTROVA (music by Satoko Fujii & Steve Adams), An Alligator in Your Wallet
- Ras Moshe, Live Spirits

2003

- Rodrigo Amado/Carlos Zingaro/Ken Filiano, The Space Between (Clean Feed)
- Avram Fefer Quartet, Shades of the Muse (CIMP)
- Fred Hess Quartet, The Long and Short of It (Tapestry)
- Anna Saeki, Omoi (Rentrak)

2002

- Ken Filiano Solo Bass, Subvenire
- Vinny Golia, Feeding Frenzy (Music for Woodwinds & String Quartet)
- Dom Minasi Trio, Goin' Out Again (CDM)
- Fred Hess, Extended Family (Tapestry)
- Chris Chalfant, Love and Light (Jyaku Sound)
- Fred Hess, Exposed (CIMP)
- Joe Scianni, One Eyed Jack (CJR)
- Aardvark Jazz Orchestra with Sheila Jordan, Bethlehem Counterpoint (Aardmuse)

2001

- Dom Minasi Trio, Takin' The Duke Out (CDM)
- Giora Feidman Quartet, Tangoklezmer (Koch/Schwann)
- Various Artists, The Music of Eric Von Essen, Volume III
- Large Music, Large Music 2 (CIMP)
- Fred Hess, Going There (CIMP)
- Implicate Order, At Seixal (CleanFeed)
- Ursel Schlicht Quartet, Implicate Order (Soundquest)

2000

- Roswell Rudd, Broad Strokes (Knitting Factory)
- Richard Grossman Trio, Where The Sky Ended (hatOLOGY)
- Frank London, Invocations (Tzadik)
- Tina Marsh & the Bob Rodriguez Trio, Out of Time (CreOp Muse)
- Paul Smoker Trio, Mirabile Dictu (CIMP)
- Phil Haynes/Herb Robertson 5tet, BrooklynBerlin (CIMP)
- Large Music, Large Music 1 (CIMP)

1999

- Vinny Golia Quintet, Lineage
- Vinny Golia Large Ensemble, The Other Bridge (Oakland 1999)
- Bonnie Barnett, Live at Roulette
- Jim Cajacob & Friends, Knee Deep in Paradise
- Hollie Baines, A Close Call With Love
- Hafez Modirzadeh/Ramin Zoufonoun, The Mystery of Sama

1998

- Rob Blakeslee Quartet, Spirit of the Times
- Frank Giasullo Quartet, Firstlight
- Richard Grossman Trio, Even Your Ears (hatOLOGY)
- Mark Weber (poet), Time Zone Differential (Zerx)

1997

- Vinny Golia/Paul Smoker Quartet, Halloween, the Sequel
- Mark Harvey & Aardvark Jazz Orchestra, An Aardvark Christmas
- Aardvark Jazz Orchestra, Psalms & Elegies (Leo Lab)
- Chris Chalfant Trio, All in Good Time (C. Chalfant Music)
- Davida Singer (poet), Khupe
- Danielle Gasparro, The World of You

1996

- Vinny Golia/Ken Filiano Duo, The Art of Negotiation (CIMP)
- Vinny Golia Large Ensemble, Portland 1996 (Nine Winds)
- Anthony Coleman, What Is Jazz? Festival 1996 (KFW)
- Hafez Modirzadeh, The People's Blues (X DOT)
- Paul Smoker/Vinny Golia Quartet, Halloween '96 (CIMP)
- Steve Swell Quartet, Out and About (CIMP)
- Live Knitting Factory Recording, What is Jazz? 1996

1995

- Vinny Golia Large Ensemble, Tutto Contare (NWCD)
- Vinny Golia Quintet, Against the Grain (NWCD)
- Bob Rodriguez Trio, Mist (NWCD)
- Don Glandon, Only Believe (CJR)
- Brad Dutz, Krin (Interworld)
- Aardvark Jazz Orchestra, Paintings for Jazz Orchestra (Leo Lab)

1994

- Steve Adams/Ken Filiano Duo, In Out Side
- Richard Grossman Trio, Remember (512)
- Vinny Golia Quintet, Regards from Norma Desmond
- Vinny Golia Large Ensemble, Commemoration
- Bill Perkins Quintet, Frame of Mind (Interplay)
- Rob Blakeslee Quintet, Lifeline
- Paul Carmen & ESP, Passion
- Tony Lujan, Zulu (Capri)
- Jake Jacobson, Talking with the Moon (SMP)

1993

- Mark Harvey & Aardvark Jazz Orchestra, Steps Out
- Tina Marsh & Creative Opportunity Orchestra, The Heaven Line (CreOpMuse)
- Chamber Orchestra at St. Matthew's, Peter & the Wolf (Seaclef Productions)

1992

- Vinny Golia/Joelle Leandre/Ken Filiano, Haunting the Spirits Inside Them... (Music & Arts)
- Vinny Golia Large Ensemble, Decennium Dans Axlan (Nine Winds)

1991

- Sid Jacobs, It's Not Goodnight (Best Recordings)
- Richard Grossman, In the Air (Nine Winds)
- Dick Berk, The Jazz Adoption Agency (Nine Winds)
- Joey Sellers' Jazz Aggregation, Pastels, Ashes (Nine Winds)

1990

- Vinny Golia Large Ensemble, Pilgrimage to Obscurity
- Vinny Golia Chamber Trio, Worldwide & Portable (Nine Winds)
- Richard Grossman, Trio in Real Time (Nine Winds)
- Joey Sellers' Jazz Aggregation, Something for Nothing (Nine Winds)

1989

- Steve Adams/Ken Filiano Quartet, Anacrusis (Nine Winds)
- Kim Richmond Ensemble, Looking Out Looking In (Nine Winds)
- Vinny Golia Quintet, Out for Blood (Nine Winds)
- Dennis González, The Earth and the Heart (Konnex)
- Vinny Golia Trio, Puff of Smoke

1986

- Steve Adams/Ken Filiano, Hiding Out (Nine Winds)
- Richard Grossman, One...Two...Three...Four (Nine Winds)
- John Rapson, BuWah (Nine Winds)

1985

- Vinny Golia Quintet, Goin' Ahead (Nine Winds)
- Arni Cheatham, Romantha: Rumination (Talented Tenth)
