= Berlin Abbozzi =

Live album by Bill Dixon
- Released: 2000
- Recorded: November 8, 1999
- Venue: Podewil, Berlin
- Genre: Jazz
- Length: 1:09:52
- Label: FMP; CD 110
- Producer: Jost Gebers

Bill Dixon chronology
Papyrus Volume II (2000)	Berlin Abbozzi (2000)	Odyssey (2001)

Berlin Abbozzi is an album by American jazz trumpeter Bill Dixon recorded at the "Podewil", the headquarters of the Kulturprojekte Berlin non-profit organization, in 1999 and released in 2000 on the FMP label. The album features a two-part hour-long Dixon composition followed by a free improvisation. Dixon is heard on trumpet and flugelhorn, and is accompanied by Matthias Bauer and Klaus Koch on bass, and Tony Oxley on drums. This instrumental combination previously appeared on the Dixon albums November 1981, Vade Mecum, and Vade Mecum II.

== Reception ==
Professional ratings
Review scores
Source	Rating
AllMusic	4.5/5 stars
The Penguin Guide to Jazz	3/4 stars

In a review for AllMusic, François Couture awarded the album 4.5 stars, and wrote: "overall the atmosphere on this album is of late-night dark streets... Magnificent, very unique, and strongly recommended." The authors of the Penguin Guide to Jazz Recordings commented: "Again, Dixon experiments with this quartet formation and again the impression is of players working at some remove from each other, or rather that Dixon works at some distance from the ensemble."

Writing for All About Jazz, Derek Taylor stated: "This is music that deftly dodges codification, dealing in open-ended ambiguities rather than easily digestible certainties. Dixon continues to confound and challenge, remaining uncompromising both in his music and his beliefs. The results of his impregnable resolve are recordings such as this that reward exploration on their own terms." In a separate review for the same publication, Andrew Lindstrom praised Dixon's cover art, calling it "a beautifully balanced piece, mostly shades of a single hue, with a certain aura of forboding mystery", and wrote: "The music only grows more interesting with each listening... Dixon's complete control of his instrument is immediately apparent, and his first-hand knowledge of the trumpet's historical lineage in American music allows him to look to the future, to chart new trajectories... It is music which practically invents itself moment-by-moment, with remarkable clarity." In yet another All About Jazz review, John Sharpe commented: "This is an excellent disc easily recommended to anyone willing to immerse themselves in Bill Dixon’s sound world."

== Track listing ==
1. "Berlin Abbozzi: Currents" (Dixon) - 21:39
2. "Berlin Abbozzi: Open Quiet/The Orange Bell" (Dixon) - 40:14
3. "Acrolithes" (Dixon/Koch/Bauer/Oxley) - 7:59

Recorded on November 8, 1999, at the Podewil, Berlin.

== Personnel ==
- Bill Dixon – trumpet, flugelhorn
- Matthias Bauer – bass
- Klaus Koch – bass
- Tony Oxley – drums
