= Duets 1992 =

Studio album by Bill Dixon and Cecil Taylor
- Released: 2019
- Recorded: July 2–3, 1992
- Venue: La Masterbox, L'École Nationale de Musique, Villeurbanne, France
- Genre: jazz
- Label: Triple Point Records; TPR 241
- Producer: Sharon Vogel

Cecil Taylor chronology
The Tree of Life (1998)	Duets 1992 (2019)	Always a Pleasure (1996)

Bill Dixon chronology
Son of Sisyphus (1990)	Duets 1992 (2019)	Vade Mecum (1994)

Duets 1992 is an album by Bill Dixon and Cecil Taylor recorded at La Masterbox studios at L'École Nationale de Musique in Villeurbanne, France on July 2 and 3, 1992, and released as a limited edition double-LP set by Triple Point Records in 2019. It was recorded during a brief tour of France and Italy, and was their first studio reunion since the 1966 session that yielded Conquistador!. Despite this, according to Ben Young's liner notes, Dixon and Taylor did not rehearse or discuss the music before or during the recording session. The pair would reunite in a live setting for 2002's Taylor/Dixon/Oxley.

== Reception ==
Scott Yanow wrote: "Usually when Taylor recorded with others, it was up to the other musicians to meet him on his own terms... But for Duets 1992, Taylor shows his affection for Dixon by playing more in the trumpeter's musical world. Dixon tended to utilize space more, could be quite gentle in his playing at times, and let the sound explorations in his music develop gradually rather than hitting one with full force from the beginning. The opening improvisation on Duets 1992 starts so peacefully for its first three minutes that it is a bit of a shock when Dixon suddenly lets out a high-register blast from his trumpet. At times in the program, Taylor almost sounds like he is a sideman, but it is fair to say that he takes control at various times, playing dazzling explosions of sound behind Dixon's long tones and very expressive sounds. Still, he is mostly on the trumpeter's turf. The end results are often fascinating and are easily recommended to those with open ears towards free form music."

Writing for Twittering Machines, Michael Lavorgna commented: "What you'll hear, if you listen, is two musicians who, at the time of this recording, had 40+ years of playing. 40+ years of developing their own unique voice and forms of communication playing live, in studio, together. Unrehearsed, unscripted. The recording quality is brilliant, highly dynamic (and I mean highly), and the interplay is pure time-defying magic."

In a review for The Absolute Sound, Derk Richardson stated: "for those who go with flow of freely improvised 'jazz'... this previously unissued meeting of two avant-garde giants is audio manna from heaven... Their very different stylistic approaches are pivotal to the pleasures of immersive listening to these 11 numbered pieces across two virgin vinyl LPs. Comparison to abstract impressionist painting is appropriate, but the music's constant movement evokes even more the spontaneous synchronicity of huge swells in the ocean — Dixon's sustained notes, legato lines, and echoing electronic effects, recessed deep in the mix — and seemingly random sparkles of light on the surface — Taylor's jittery, splashing notes, altogether mesmerizing and sublime."

Francis Davis, writing for NPR Music, called the album "a head-on collision of two alpha avant-gardists, meeting each other halfway but neither giving another inch."

== Track listing ==
1. "Piece One" – 12:50
2. "Piece Two" – 9:39
3. "Piece Three" – 20:58
4. "Piece Four" – 4:12
5. "Piece Five" – 16:01
6. "Piece Six" – 3:54
7. "Piece Seven" – 2:35
8. "Piece Eight" – 2:53
9. "Piece Nine" – 3:24
10. "Piece Ten" – 14:32
11. "Piece Eleven" – 2:09

== Personnel ==
- Bill Dixon – trumpet
- Cecil Taylor – piano
