= Tapestries for Small Orchestra =

Studio album by Bill Dixon
- Released: 2009
- Recorded: July 8–10, 2008
- Studio: Firehouse 12, New Haven
- Genre: Jazz
- Length: 108:48
- Label: Firehouse 12
- Producer: Bill Dixon

Bill Dixon chronology
17 Musicians in Search of a Sound: Darfur (2008)	Tapestries for Small Orchestra (2009)	Envoi (2011)

Tapestries for Small Orchestra is an album by American jazz trumpeter Bill Dixon, which was recorded in 2008 and released on Firehouse 12 Records. The triple disc set includes two audio CDs of specially commissioned original music plus a documentary film featuring interviews and session footage. The small orchestra is a nine-piece group with personnel drawn, for the most part, from the large ensemble that recorded 17 Musicians in Search of a Sound: Darfur a year before.

== Reception ==
Professional ratings
Review scores
Source	Rating
Down Beat	5/5 stars
All About Jazz #1	5/5 stars
All About Jazz #2	5/5 stars

The Down Beat review by Bill Shoemaker states "Tapestries for Small Orchestra is the most persuasive, comprehensive case for Bill Dixon’s iconic status since November 1981 and perhaps even his 1966 landmark orchestra album, Intents and Purposes.

The All About Jazz review by John Sharpe states "Each track is a treasure trove of cohesive detail executed to wonderful effect. While full explication is beyond the scope of this review, this is essential listening for anyone interested in the state of contemporary jazz orchestration." In a separate review for All About Jazz, Nic Jones wrote: "The ensemble assembled here deserves all the plaudits it should receive. Collectively it is alert to every nuance of Dixon's writing, and whilst that ought to be taken for granted the real distinction lies in the fact that this is music in which the role of the soloist is negated to the point of irrelevance. The ensemble is the key and the very colors inherent in Dixon's writing are dependent upon the depth of the ensemble's empathy... In unassumingly putting forward the case for the composer, Dixon by default throws the spotlight onto the musicians, so crucial is their role in taking the notes from the page and breathing life into them."

In a review for the BBC Bill Tilland claims "The music defies classification and is sometimes ‘difficult’, but Dixon’s academic sensibilities are clearly energised by a soulful, passionate aesthetic... Tapestries is not for the timid or intellectually complacent listener, but anyone prepared to meet Dixon's music halfway will reap some significant rewards."

The JazzTimes review by Chris Kelsey states "Dixon takes full advantage of the sound-making possibilities inherent in the grouping, and his manner of combining tonal shapes parallels his visual art."

== Track listing ==
All compositions by Bill Dixon

Disc One:

1. "Motorcycle '66: Reflections & Ruminations" - 13:30
2. "Slivers: Sand Dance for Sophia" - 9:20
3. "Phrygian II" - 16:04
4. "Adagio: Slow Mauve Scribblings" - 17:30

Disc Two:

1. "Allusions I" - 9:08
2. "Tapestries" - 12:29
3. "Durations of Permanence" - 14:45
4. "Innocenenza" - 16:02

== Personnel ==
- Bill Dixon - trumpet, electronics
- Taylor Ho Bynum - cornet, flugelhorn, bass trumpet, piccolo trumpet
- Graham Haynes - cornet, flugelhorn, electronics
- Stephen Haynes - trumpet, cornet, flugelhorn
- Rob Mazurek - cornet, electronics
- Glynis Loman - cello
- Michel Cote - contrabass clarinet, bass clarinet
- Ken Filiano - bass, electronics
- Warren Smith - vibraphone, drums, tympani, gongs
