= Vademecum (disambiguation) =

Vademecum is a Latin phrase for a handbook. In medicine, the concept of Vademecum applied to medicines and other pharma products. In modern times, the term extended to digital health products, using the word Vadimecum (with "di" instead of "de").

Vademecum or vade mecum may also refer to:

- Vade Mecum and Vade Mecum II, albums by American jazz trumpeter Bill Dixon
- Vade-mecum (Norwid), an 1866 verse collection by Polish poet Cyprian Norwid

== See also ==
- Vademecum for Confessors, handbook released by the Vatican (see Religious views on birth control)
- "Vademecum skauta", song on the album Lady Pank (1982)
