= Considerations 1972–1976 =

Live album by Bill Dixon
- Released: 1981
- Recorded: 1972–1976
- Genre: Free jazz
- Length: 42:41 (volume 1); 38:34 (volume 2)
- Labels: Fore; 80/THREE; 80/FIVE
- Producers: Dario Barassi, Ugo Maione

Bill Dixon chronology
Bill Dixon in Italy Volume One (1980)	Considerations 1972–1976 (1981)	Bill Dixon in Italy Volume Two (1981)

Volume two cover

Considerations 1972–1976, Volumes 1 and 2, is a pair of live albums by trumpeter and composer Bill Dixon. They were recorded during 1972 to 1976, a period during which Dixon was teaching at Bennington College and was, in his own words, "in total isolation from the market places of this music." Released in 1981 by the Italian Fore label, the recordings help to document the gap between the 1967 album Intents and Purposes and the Soul Note albums of the early 1980s.

Volume 1 features two trios, along with three solo works, two of which were later released on Odyssey: Solo Works (2001). Volume 2 features another solo work, a composition for trumpet and orchestra, a duo for trumpet and drums, and a chamber work.

== Reception ==
Professional ratings
Review scores
Source	Rating
AllMusic	4/5 stars
The Virgin Encyclopedia of Jazz	3/5 stars

Author Colin Larkin noted the "essentially reflective nature" of Dixon's music, and, regarding the small ensemble compositions, stated that "the results are remarkable for their balance of intellectual freight, sensitivity to nuance and implicit structural coherence."

Phil Freeman of Burning Ambulance commented: "The two Considerations LPs have never been reissued on vinyl or CD; they're not on any streaming service; and they're not that easy to come by. Some enterprising soul should absolutely find the rights (and the tapes) and get them back out there, though, because the music is extraordinary and beautiful and 100% worth hearing for all Bill Dixon fans and anyone with an ear for adventurous, creative music."

== Volume 1 track listing ==
All compositions by Bill Dixon.

Side A

1. "Places and Things" (1976) – 12:42
2. "Long Alone Song" (1975) – 6:38
3. "Shrike" (1973) – 0:55

Side B

1. "Pages" (1975) – 15:54
2. "Solo" (1973) – 6:32
- Track A1 was performed in Paris. Remaining tracks were performed at Bennington College, Vermont.

== Volume 1 personnel ==
- Bill Dixon – trumpet (side A, all tracks; side B, track 2), piano (side B, track 1)
- Steve Horenstein – tenor saxophone (side A, track 1; side B, track 1)
- Alan Silva – bass (side A, track 1)
- Henry Letcher – percussion (side B, track 1)

== Volume 2 track listing ==
All compositions by Bill Dixon.

Side A

1. "Webern" (1973) – 0:14
2. "Orchestra Piece" (1972) – 11:50
3. "Duo # One (Part One)" (1975) – 7:15

Side B

1. "Duo # One (Part Two)" (1975) – 6:20
2. "Sequences" (1972) – 12:55
- Tracks A1, A3 and B1 were performed at Bennington College, Vermont. Tracks A2 and B2 were performed in Madison, Wisconsin.

== Volume 2 personnel ==
- Bill Dixon – trumpet
- Steve Horenstein – tenor saxophone (side B, track 2)
- Jay Ash – baritone saxophone (side B, track 2)
- Jim Tifft – trumpet (side B, track 2)
- Jeff Hoyer – trombone (side B, track 2)
- Chris Billias – percussion (side B, track 2)
- Henry Letcher – percussion (side A, track 3; side B, track 1)
- Orchestra of University of Wisconsin, Madison (side A, track 2)
