= KMB =

KMB or kmb may refer to:

- KMB Jazz, a record label
- Khushhali Microfinance Bank, Pakistan
- Kimberly-Clark Corporation, NYSE symbol
- Kowloon Motor Bus, Hong Kong
- Kimbundu, an Angolan language, based on its ISO 639-3 code.
