= 17 Musicians in Search of a Sound: Darfur =

Live album by Bill Dixon
- Released: 2008
- Recorded: June 20, 2007
- Venue: Angel Orensanz Center, New York City
- Genre: Jazz
- Length: 56:38
- Label: AUM Fidelity
- Producer: Bill Dixon

Bill Dixon chronology
Bill Dixon with Exploding Star Orchestra (2008)	17 Musicians in Search of a Sound: Darfur (2008)	Tapestries for Small Orchestra (2009)

17 Musicians in Search of a Sound: Darfur is a live album by American jazz trumpeter Bill Dixon. The project, a tour de force of orchestral composition, conduction and improvisational exploration, was specially commissioned by Arts for Art, recorded at the 2007 Vision Festival and released on AUM Fidelity.

== Reception ==
Professional ratings
Review scores
Source	Rating
AllMusic	4/5 stars
All About Jazz #1	5/5 stars
All About Jazz #2	2.5/5 stars
All About Jazz #3	4.5/5 stars
Pitchfork	7.5/10 stars

In his review for AllMusic, Michael G. Nastos stated: "this is not an angry or disgusted expressionistic music, but one that reflects the distant outcries of the people in Darfur who need help from the world community... This is a project of austere emotion, clever counterpoint, and searing reality in dedication to a condition in the so-called civilized world that should never, ever be."

Writing for All About Jazz, John Sharpe remarked: "Trumpeter Bill Dixon works with an orchestral conception, even when playing solo, so it is fascinating to hear what happens when he has 17 musicians at his disposal... it is hard to think who else could deploy such forces to such deft effect, creating a towering work in a class of its own." In a separate review for All About Jazz, Mark Corroto wrote: "Dixon was given talent but little time for rehearsal and changes. This makes for a part composed, part improvised series of passages. There's the feeling that Dixon is guiding this who's who of creative players, but at other times they are free to fill in as their own muse dictates. The music is, nonetheless, up to Dixon's standards. Players create moods for his vast open landscape of a vision, crafting solos in between caverns of sound... 17 Musicians In Search Of A Sound has the feel of a coarse-sewn rug, made from very fine materials. Given time and perhaps a long tour... this music might become tighter and more easily consumable. But, then again, it wouldn't be Bill Dixon music." Nic Jones, in another All About Jazz review, stated: "It's clear, on something like In Search Of A Sound, that instrumental color must have been one of Dixon's abiding concerns. He summons up static blocks of sound comprised of individual voices in the service of some grim, foreboding end that remains unrealized..." Jones concludes by calling the album "a program of music designed not for comfort listening but for challenging and, perhaps, raging against mortality and the horrors and restrictions it imposes."

Joe Tangari, writing for Pitchfork, commented: "From a listener's standpoint, the project's tonal and textural variety and relatively simple organization makes it more approachable than a great deal of free music for newcomers to the genre, though it still takes a willingness to abandon usual structures. In fact, for its flow from violence to calm and back, it bears as much similarity to modern chamber works like Olivier Messiaen's 'Quartet for the End of Time' as it does to Albert Ayler, Cecil Taylor and other free jazz luminaries. Whatever the associates, though, Dixon has created an outstanding work of modern jazz and political commentary."

== Track listing ==
All compositions by Bill Dixon

1. "Prelude" - 3:07
2. "Intrados" - 3:58
3. "In Search of a Sound" - 4:15
4. "Contour One" - 1:43
5. "Contour Two" - 0:10
6. "Scattering of the Following" - 7:00
7. "Darfur" - 5:27
8. "Contour Three" - 3:14
9. "Sinopia" - 23:37
10. "Pentimento I" - 0:43
11. "Pentimento II" - 0:17
12. "Pentimento III" - 0:22
13. "Pentimento IV" - 2:41

== Personnel ==
- Bill Dixon - trumpet
- Graham Haynes, Stephen Haynes, Taylor Ho Bynum - cornet, flugelhorn
- Dick Griffin, Steve Swell - trombone
- Joseph Daley - tuba
- Karen Borca - bassoon
- Will Connell - bass clarinet
- Michel Cote - contrabass clarinet
- Andrew Raffo Dewar - soprano sax
- John Hagen - tenor sax, baritone sax
- J.D. Parran - bass sax, bamboo flute
- Andrew Lafkas - bass
- Glynis Loman - cello
- Jackson Krall - drums, percussion
- Warren Smith - vibraphone, tympani, drums
