= Weight/Counterweight =

Studio album by Bill Dixon, Aaron Siegel, and Ben Hall
- Released: 2009
- Genre: Free jazz
- Label: Editions Brokenresearch br-041

Additional cover image

Weight/Counterweight is a double-LP album by trumpeter Bill Dixon and percussionists Aaron Siegel and Ben Hall. It was released in 2009 by Editions Brokenresearch in a limited edition of 500 copies, and was one of Dixon's final recordings before his death in 2010.

== Reception ==
Professional ratings
Review scores
Source	Rating
The Free Jazz Collective	5/5 stars

A reviewer for The Free Jazz Collective awarded the album a full 5 stars, calling it "fantastic," and commenting: "The music... is light as a breeze in its form, with sounds that sometimes barely create ripples in the silence, with zen-like punctuation and formless precision, yet full of substance and power... like a Japanese ink drawing, a few brush strokes are sufficient to evoke everything that needs to be said, a world by itself, creating an incredible memory imprint and listening experience.

Paris Transatlantic's Dan Warburton wrote: "The pace is uniform and leisurely and the mood contemplative, but there's a sense of underlying tension and extreme concentration throughout... Vibraphones and glockenspiels, struck and bowed, envelop Dixon's velvety tones in a warm glow, but there's not the slightest hint of easy listening chillout here: when the music does explode... its power, its weight, is tremendous."

Writing for Arthur, Byron Coley and Thurston Moore called the album "one of the high points of [Dixon's] recording career," and remarked: "the two percussionists provide gorgeous interaction for Dixon's processed trumpet tones, and the 2LP set slides into a very deep zone. Dixon was always a perfectionist, and he rarely played with such grace."

Clifford Allen of Signal to Noise noted the "large, glacial areas with easy-breathing deliberateness" created by the percussionists, and commented: "Dixon says he 'always works orchestrally,' and Weight/Counterweight is powerful evidence of this."

A writer for Still Single described the album as a "slab of pensive atmospheric jazz textures," and stated: "Probably the easiest step you'll be able to take in discovering a legend as of right now, so believers and newcomers are welcome to try this on. Subtlety is redefined. RIP Bill."

Writing for Six Moons, Michael Lavorgna called the album "completely stunning," and remarked: "Dixon sounds at times like a Tibetan monk blowing some long-assed earth-shaking horn. At others more like some minimalist modernist who in a very silent way breathes echoed musical essence into spirit form... Primal, elemental, brutal, forceful, quiet, serene and all that (free) jazz."

== Track listing ==
=== Disc 1 ===
Side A

1. "Atelier: Corbu's Studio" – 13:59

Side B

1. "Hirado" – 12:23

=== Disc 2 ===
Side A

1. "Contrapposto" – 17:40

Side B

1. "The Red & the Black" – 17:05

== Personnel ==
- Bill Dixon – trumpet
- Aaron Siegel – percussion
- Ben Hall – percussion
