= Melancholy (Cecil Taylor album) =

Live album by Cecil Taylor's Workshop Ensemble

Live album by Cecil Taylor
- Released: 1999
- Recorded: September 30, 1990
- Genre: Free jazz
- Length: 70:07
- Label: FMP
- Producer: Jost Gebers

Cecil Taylor chronology
Nailed (2000)	Melancholy (1999)	The Tree of Life (1998)

Melancholy is a live album by Cecil Taylor's Workshop Ensemble featuring Evan Parker, Barry Guy and Tony Oxley recorded on September 30, 1990, at the Bechstein Concert Hall in Berlin and released on the FMP label.

== Reception ==
Professional ratings
Review scores
Source	Rating
Allmusic	4/5 stars
The Penguin Guide to Jazz Recordings	3.5/4 stars

The Allmusic review by Steven Loewy states "Taylor is unquestionably more effective as an arranger in the small group (and solo) contexts to which he is accustomed. With the ensemble, there is a sense that ideas are not always fully realized, although, to be sure, there are remarkable moments throughout. Whether charges of incomplete or confusing rehearsals are accurate is immaterial. What matters is that the results, while good, probably could have been better. Regardless, Taylor aficionados will want to own this one because of the players in the band and because of the extraordinary moments".

The authors of the Penguin Guide to Jazz Recordings wrote: "it is... enough to have other composers and arrangers slack-jawed, with three pieces that put an evolving structure through complex changes and developments. If the middle section, 'Sphere No. 2', seems like a bonding of improvisors, then 'Sphere No. 3' expands to a glorious reconciliation of free solos and composed and implicit structures."

== Track listing ==
All compositions by Cecil Taylor.

1. "Sphere No. 1" - 20:33
2. "Sphere No. 2" - 20:36
3. "Sphere No. 3" - 28:59

- Recorded at the Bechstein Concert Hall, Berlin on September 30, 1990

== Personnel ==
- Cecil Taylor: piano
- Tobias Netta: trumpet
- Wolfgang Fuchs: sopranino saxophone, bass clarinet
- Harri Sjöström: soprano saxophone
- Volker Schlott: alto saxophone
- Evan Parker: tenor saxophone, soprano saxophone
- Thomas Klemm: tenor saxophone
- Jörg Huke: Thomas Wiedermann: trombone
- Barry Guy: double bass
- Tony Oxley: drums
