= Opium for Franz =

Studio album by Franz Koglmann and Bill Dixon
- Released: 1977
- Recorded: December 19, 1975; August 6, 1976; November 3, 1976
- Studio: Studio Heinz, Vienna; Studio Acousti, Paris
- Genre: Free jazz
- Length: 35:25
- Label: Pipe Records; PR 152

2019 reissue cover

Opium for Franz (also listed as Opium/For Franz) is an album by trumpeters Franz Koglmann and Bill Dixon. It was recorded during 1975 and 1976 in Vienna and Paris, and was issued on LP with hand-made cover art by the small, obscure Pipe label, founded by Koglmann in 1973, and having a total of three releases in its catalog. In 2019, the album was reissued by the Black Monk label.

In 2001, three tracks from the album were reissued by the Between the Lines label on Opium.

== Reception ==
Professional ratings
Review scores
Source	Rating
AllMusic	3/5 stars
All About Jazz	4/5 stars
The Virgin Encyclopedia of Jazz	3/5 stars

In a review for AllMusic, Eugene Chadbourne wrote: "back when [Koglmann] put out this album by himself, there were no banks to back him up and everything was done by hand, literally. Lucky fans who can scramble up a copy of the original vinyl pressing will be the proud owners of a totally handmade piece of work, the paper collage design glued and stamped on the front cover and the liner notes literally written individually on each copy in magic marker."

Mark Corroto of All About Jazz called the album a "gem of a recording," and commented: "These... sessions are significant for the introduction and recognition of Koglmann's horn and, probably more importantly, his compositions." Regarding Dixon's "For Franz," he remarked: "As with much of Dixon's and Koglmann's music, the mode is cinematic. Dixon arranges the parts to mix melody with meditations, solos vault into the composition and recede. Fans of Dixon's later work will hear the early seeds planted here."

Writing for JazzWord, Ken Waxman stated that the recordings "confirm the continued validity of freely expressed improvisation. They also show why nationalism, musical or otherwise, promotes more bluster than brilliance."

== Track listing ==
Side A

1. "For Franz" (Bill Dixon) – 17:04

Side B

1. "Der Vogel, Opium (To Jean Cocteau)" (Franz Koglmann) – 6:38
2. "Carmilla (To Sheridan Le Fanu)" (Franz Koglmann) – 4:56
3. "Karl Und Das Löschpapier (To Konrad Bayer)" (Franz Koglmann) – 8:47
- Track A1 was recorded at Studio Heinz in Vienna, Austria, on August 6, 1976. Tracks B1 and B2 were recorded at Studio Acousti in Paris, France on December 19, 1975. Track B3 was recorded at Studio Heinz in Vienna, Austria on November 3, 1976.

== Personnel ==
Track A1

- Franz Koglmann – trumpet
- Bill Dixon – trumpet
- Steve Horenstein – tenor saxophone
- Alan Silva – bass
- Muhammad Mali (Walter M. Malli) – cymbals

Tracks B1 and B2

- Franz Koglmann – flugelhorn
- Steve Lacy – soprano saxophone
- Joseph Traindl – trombone
- Cesarius Alvim Bothello – bass
- Aldo Romano – drums

Track B3

- Franz Koglmann – trumpet
- Tony Michlmayr – bass
- Gerd Geier – computer
