= Bill Dixon with Exploding Star Orchestra =

Studio album by Bill Dixon
- Released: 2008
- Recorded: September 1 and 3, 2007
- Studios: Electrical Audio Studios, Chicago
- Genre: Jazz
- Labels: Thrill Jockey; 192

Bill Dixon chronology
Odyssey (2001)	Bill Dixon with Exploding Star Orchestra (2008)	17 Musicians in Search of a Sound: Darfur (2008)

Bill Dixon with Exploding Star Orchestra is an album by American jazz trumpeter Bill Dixon and Rob Mazurek's Exploding Star Orchestra. It was recorded at Electrical Audio studios in Chicago in 2007, and was released in 2008 on the Thrill Jockey label. The album features two versions of a composition by Dixon plus one by Mazurek. The album was recorded following a suggestion by Mazurek that Dixon perform with the Exploding Star Orchestra at the Chicago Jazz Festival.

== Background ==
Dixon and Mazurek first met at the Guelph Jazz Festival in Ontario, Canada in September 2006, after which Mazurek suggested pairing Dixon with the Exploding Star Orchestra for an event at the Chicago Jazz Festival. The album features two versions of Dixon's composition "Entrances," with Dixon shaping his written musical material via spontaneous conducting. Mazurek's composition "Constellations For Innerlight Projections" is dedicated to Dixon, and involved a video score to be realized by seven laptop musicians, with other musicians either conducted by Mazurek or responding in an improvisational way. According to Mazurek, the piece "suggests the idea... that life out there begins in here and is also a tribute to the way Bill Dixon forged new paths in the way the trumpet is perceived and could be used to create new other worldly sound." Mazurek reflected: "Bill's concept of playing is so original. His sound and ideas really have the capacity to transform a thing... his sound really transformed the suites on this recording into something spectacular."

== Reception ==
Professional ratings
Review scores
Source	Rating
AllMusic	3.5/5 stars
PopMatters	7/10 stars

In a review for AllMusic, Stewart Mason called the album "a free-improv delight making plain the links between the original scene and the contemporary Chicago post-rock school." Martin Longley, writing for the BBC, commented: "Dixon's two-part "Entrances" bookends the disc, dedicated to solar storm-brewing, utilising a palette of shimmering vibraphone, dappled piano, murmuring timpani drums and deeply slumbering bass. The co-leaders trade echoed horn spirals, and the Orchestra plays as one cerebellum, shunting from complete spacious abstraction to unstoppably rolling themes. Mazurek's lengthy "Constellations For Innerlight Projections" is even more impressive, complete with a retro cosmic proclamation by Damon Locks that evokes the 1960s and '70s vibrating spheres of Sun Ra, and with an instrumental gait that suggests Moondog on the move; tubular bells chiming resoundingly."

In an article at All About Jazz, Troy Collins wrote: "A rare but welcome addition to Dixon's discography and a highpoint in the budding career of Mazurek, the powerful and multi-layered Bill Dixon with Exploding Star Orchestra is a classic that will be studied for years to come." In a separate review for the same publication, Greg Camphire called the album "a sprawling meeting of minds," and commented: "Bill Dixon with Exploding Star Orchestra explores many moods over the course of each kaleidoscopic piece. It may take patience and close listening to fully reveal its rewards, but the results of Dixon and Mazurek's mutual admiration society are well worth a serious investigation."

Writing for PopMatters, Michael Patrick Brady remarked: "Bill Dixon with the Exploding Star Orchestra never bears too much resemblance to either of the parties involved, instead maintaining a precious balance in which both can offer their talents and skills without overpowering or deferring to one another. The record is an opportunity to hear Dixon in a rare ensemble setting, and see how his mind arranges the tools presented to him by Mazurek, while also seeing how nimbly the Exploding Star Orchestra can help the master realize his visions without compromising them."

== Track listing ==
1. "Entrances / One" (Dixon) - 18:09
2. "Constellations For Innerlight Projections (For Bill Dixon)" (Mazurek) - 24:12
3. "Entrances / Two" (Dixon) - 18:11

Recorded on September 1 and 3, 2007 at Electrical Audio, Chicago

== Personnel ==
- Bill Dixon – trumpet
- Rob Mazurek – cornet
- Nicole Mitchell – flute, voice
- Matt Bauder – bass clarinet, tenor saxophone
- Jeb Bishop – trombone
- Josh Berman – cornet
- Jeff Parker – guitar
- Jim Baker – piano
- Jason Adasiewicz – vibraphone, tubular bells
- Matthew Lux – bass guitar
- Jason Ajemian – double bass
- Mike Reed – drums, timpani
- John Herndon – drums
- Damon Locks – voice

== Production ==
- Greg Norman – recording engineer
- Bill Dixon, Rob Mazurek – cover art
