= Franz Koglmann =

Austrian jazz composer

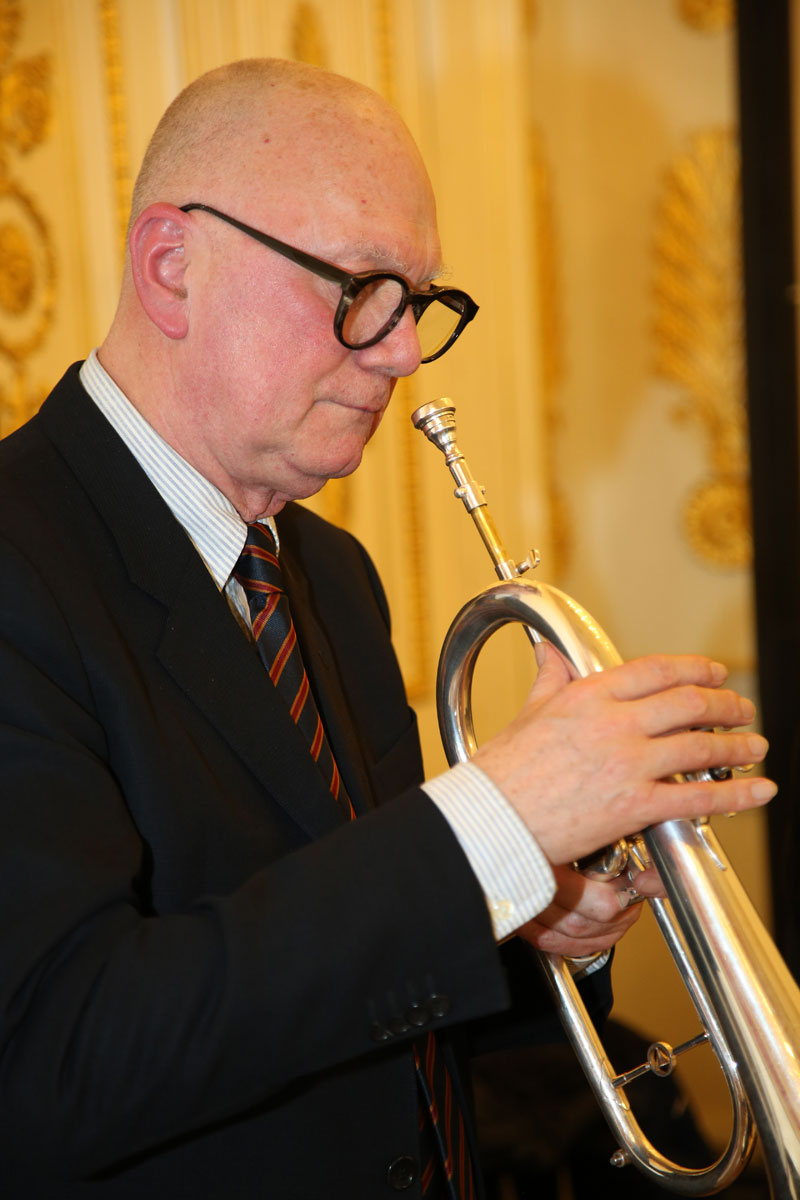

Background information
- Born: 22 May 1947 (age 78); Mödling, Austria
- Genres: Avant-garde jazz Chamber jazz Third Stream
- Occupations: Composer; Trumpet player
- Instruments: Trumpet, flugelhorn

Franz Koglmann (born 22 May 1947) is an Austrian jazz composer. He performs on both the trumpet and flugelhorn in most often in avant-garde jazz and third stream. Koglmann has performed or recorded with Lee Konitz, Paul Bley, Bill Dixon, Georg Gräwe, Andrea Centazzo, Theo Jörgensmann, Wolfgang Reisinger, Enrico Rava, Yitzhak Yedid, Ran Blake, and John Lindberg; together with the bassist Peter Herbert he has often musically accompanied works of the Austrian artist Heidi Harsieber.

When the Romanian town of Sibiu commissioned Koglmann to write a piece, he brought together bits from Haydn's 27th symphony with a tape recording of Sibiu native Emil Cioran philosophisizing. In 2003, he received the highest Austrian jazz award, the Hans Koller Prize, in the category Album of the Year.

== Discography ==
=== As leader ===
- Franz Koglmann (1973). Flaps. Pipe.
- Franz Koglmann (1977). Opium for Franz. Pipe.
- Franz Koglmann (1984). Schlaf Schlemmer, Schlaf Magritte. hatART.
- Franz Koglmann (1986). Ich. hatART.
- Franz Koglmann (1990). Orte Der Geometrie. hatART.
- Franz Koglmann Pipetet (1990). The Use of Memory. hatART.
- Franz Koglmann (1990). A White Line. hatART.
- L'Heure Bleue (hatART, 1991)
- Franz Koglmann (1995). Cantos I-IV. hatHUT.
- Franz Koglmann (1997). O Moon My Pin-Up. hatOLOGY.
- Franz Koglmann (1999). Make Believe. Between the Lines.
- Franz Koglmann & Monoblue Quartet (2000). An Affair with Strauss. Between the Lines.
- Franz Koglmann (2001). Don't Play, Just Be. Between the Lines.
- Franz Koglmann (2001). Venus In Transit. Between the Lines.
- Franz Koglmann (2003). Fear Death By Water. Between the Lines.
- Franz Koglmann (2005). Let's Make Love. Between the Lines.
- Franz Koglmann (2007). Nocturnal Walks
- Franz Koglmann (2019). Fruits of Solitude. Between the Lines.

=== As collaborator ===
- Steve Lacy: Itinerary (hat ART, 1991)
- Paul Bley: 12 (+6) In a Row (HatART, 1990, [1995])
- Paul Bley: Annette (HatART, 1993)
- Ton Art (1995). Mal Vu Mal Dit. hatHUT.
- Lee Konitz: We Thought About Duke (HatART, 1994)
- Ton Art (1995). Zu. hatHUT.
- Michel Wintsch (1999). Michel Wintsch & Road Movie. Between the Lines.
- Tony Coe; Roger Kellaway (2000). British-American Blue. EFA.
- Enrico Rava (2000). Duo En Noir. Between the Lines.
- Oskar Aichinger (2000). Elements of Poetry. Between the Lines.
- Rajesh Mehta (2000). Reconfigurations. Between the Lines.
- Andrea Centazzo; Lol Coxhill; Franz Koglmann (2000). Situations. Robi Droli/Newtone.
- Andreas Willers (2000). Tin Drum Stories. Between the Lines.
- John Lindberg Ensemble (2000). A Tree Frog Tonality. Between the Lines.
- Peter Herbert (2001). B-A-C-H: A Chromatic Universe. Between the Lines.
- François Houle (2001). Cryptology. Between the Lines.
- Gebhard Ullmann (2001). Essencia. Between the Lines.
- Icebreaker (2001). Extraction. Between the Lines.
- James Emery (2001). Luminous Cycles. Between the Lines.
- Bill Dixon: Opium (Between the Lines, 2001) compiles tracks from Flaps and Opium for Franz
- Oskar Aichinger (2001). To Touch a Distant Soul. Between the Lines.
- Michael Moore (2002). Air Street. Between the Lines.
- Andrea Centazzo (2002). Live with the Mitteleuropa Orchestra. ICTUS RECORDS=https://www.allmusic.com/album/r636763.
- Hannes Enzlberger (2002). Songs to Anything That Moves. Between the Lines.
- Gerry Hemingway (2002). Songs. Between the Lines.
- John Lindberg Quintet (2002). Two By Five. Between the Lines.
- Giorgio Occhipinti (2003). Histoire. Between the Lines.
- Andreas Willers (2003). In The North. EFA.
- Yitzhak Yedid (2003). Myth of the Cave. Between the Lines.
- John Lindberg (2003). Ruminations Upon Ives and Gottschalk. Between the Lines.
- Oskar Aichinger (2003). Synapsis. Between the Lines.
- Hannes Enzlberger (2003). Tango 1-8. Between the Lines.
- James Emery (2003). Transformations. Between the Lines.
- Peter Herbert (2003). You're My Thrill. Between the Lines.
- Andreas Willers (2005). Montauk. Between the Lines.
- Yitzhak Yedid (2005). Passions and Prayers. Between the Lines.
- Andrea Centazzo Mitteleuropa orchestra box set = Cjiant = andrea Centazzo mitteleuropa orchestra = The Mitteleuropa Orchestra Complete Recordings - Ictus Records
- Cjant = Andrea Centazzo Mitteleuropa ORchestra =
- Moot & Lid = Franz Koglmann Lol Coxhill Andrea Centazzo = Moot & Lid - Ictus Records
- Spelunke Tapes = Franz Koglmann Lol Coxhill Andrea Centazzo = Spelunke Tapes - Ictus Records
