= Bill Dixon in Italy Volume One =

Studio album by Bill Dixon
- Released: 1980
- Recorded: June 11–13, 1980
- Studio: Barigozzi Studios, Milano
- Genre: Jazz
- Length: 41:35
- Label: Soul Note; SN 1008
- Producer: Giovanni Bonandrini

Bill Dixon chronology
Intents and Purposes (1967)	Bill Dixon in Italy Volume One (1980)	Considerations 1972–1976 (1981)

Bill Dixon in Italy Volume One is an album by American jazz trumpeter Bill Dixon, recorded in Milan in 1980 and released on the Italian Soul Note label.

== Reception ==
Professional ratings
Review scores
Source	Rating
AllMusic	4/5 stars
The Penguin Guide to Jazz Recordings	3/4 stars
The Rolling Stone Jazz Record Guide	3/5 stars
The Virgin Encyclopedia of Jazz	4/5 stars

In his review for AllMusic, Ron Wynn stated "a rare release that showed why he is so admired by musicians and has such a tough time getting recorded. The four songs contain no prominent beats or riffs, catchy hooks, sentimental melodies, or enticing devices... Even the shorter pieces have exacting unison statements and prickly solos. An unfolding, unpredictable musical dialogue."

The authors of The Penguin Guide to Jazz Recordings noted that the album is "very much in the [Cecil] Taylor line," and wrote: "Dixon doesn't feature himself that prominently, preferring to spread much of the higher voicing round the three-trumpet front line."

== Track listing ==
All compositions by Bill Dixon

1. "Summer Song One: Morning" - 4:10
2. "Firenze" - 4:45
3. "Summer Song Two: Evening" - 12:45
4. "For Cecil Taylor" - 19:55

== Personnel ==
- Bill Dixon - trumpet, piano
- Arthur Brooks - trumpet
- Stephen Haynes - trumpet
- Stephen Horenstein - tenor saxophone, baritone saxophone
- Alan Silva - bass
- Freddie Waits - drums
