= Odyssey: Solo Works =

Studio album by Bill Dixon
- Released: 2001
- Recorded: 1970–92
- Genre: Jazz
- Label: Archive/Edition; 510 1925 1

Bill Dixon chronology
| Berlin Abbozzi (2000) | Odyssey: Solo Works (2001) | Bill Dixon with Exploding Star Orchestra (2008) |

Odyssey: Solo Works is a six-CD album by Bill Dixon. It was recorded from 1970 to 1992 at a variety of locations, and was self-released in limited quantities in 2001, with distribution by Triple Point Records. The sixth disc contains commentary by Dixon on his music and life. The album also includes two booklets, one containing interviews and essays, and the other containing reproductions of some of Dixon's paintings.

Odyssey includes all of the tracks previously heard on Collection (1985), as well as several tracks that were previously released on Considerations 1 (1981) and Bill Dixon 1982 (1982).

== Reception ==
Professional ratings
Review scores
| Source | Rating |
|---|---|
| AllMusic | 4.5/5 stars |
| The Penguin Guide to Jazz | 3.5/4 stars |

In a review for AllMusic, Steve Loewy wrote: "While five hours of solo trumpet is exhausting to hear... there is no denying Dixon's original voice, individual style, and astonishing technique. Space plays an important role in his sound, the trumpeter knowing when to harness the power of silence. Purity of sound is another important element, Dixon's pristine tone a pure pleasure. Dixon occasionally adds reverb, giving his notes a slight echo. Other distinguishing characteristics include his use of the full range of the horn, from the pedal tones to the highest reaches, and his extraordinary use of breath, pushed through the horn at varying volumes. Granted, this is not easy listening, and there are few melodies or conventional signposts. Listening to all these hours of solo Dixon takes self-discipline and might be compared to hearing a long postmodern poetry recital. But, for those willing to make the effort, and who can appreciate the contributions of an extraordinary talent, this boxed set will bring endless hours of pleasure."

The authors of The Penguin Guide to Jazz awarded the album 3½ stars, and stated: "These mostly lo-fi recordings are a valuable record of [Dixon's] progress as a solo performer... The box set... is for specialists only but it's a rewarding experience... for anyone interested in his self-determined and sometimes lonely career... it's to Dixon's eternal credit that every piece... seems to have its own logic and purpose."

Writing for Burning Ambulance, Phil Freeman commented: "Odyssey remains a landmark in Bill Dixon's artistic journey, and in the history of what he referred to as 'this music,' meaning post-bebop Black creative music... this is extraordinarily beautiful music, capable of captivating anyone who listens with even the most casual curiosity... It's not the easiest thing to find... but there are still some copies floating around, and it's absolutely worth the search."

== Track listing ==
All compositions by Bill Dixon.

=== Disc 1 ===
1. "When Winter Comes" – 8:15
2. "Webern Work / Study" – 1:14
3. "Tracings II" – 1:22
4. "The Long Walk" – 7:44
5. "Momenti" – 2:42
6. "Stanza" – 5:00
7. "I See Your Fancy Footwork – 1" – 8:05
8. "I See Your Fancy Footwork – 2" – 5:28
9. "I See Your Fancy Footwork – 3" – 2:52
10. "Mosaic" – 0:43
11. "Albert Ayler" – 0:59
12. "Summerdance For Judith Dunn – Pt. One" – 8:28
13. "Tracings" – 9:00
14. "The Long Line" – 5:44
15. "Swirls" – 2:29

=== Disc 2 ===
1. "Requiem For Booker Little" – 5:07
2. "Masques I" – 8:38
3. "The End Of Silence" – 0:59
4. "Odyssey/Interruptus" – 5:35
5. "Murmurs" – 6:46
6. "Flame" – 3:09
7. "Meta-pedal" – 6:11
8. "Elegantissmo" – 9:51
9. "Changes" – 2:54
10. "Dominoes" – 2:52
11. "Pyramide" – 3:57
12. "Long Alone Song" – 6:34
13. "Shrike" – 0:57

=== Disc 3 ===
1. "Jerusalem" – 26:50
2. "Umbra E Luce - For Sid Makay" – 11:31
3. "The Somnambulist" – 4:08
4. "Conncordde" – 4:37
5. "Fortunata" – 8:13
6. "Graffiti Sui Soffiti" – 1:51

=== Disc 4 ===
1. "Postcards" – 5:56
2. "For Wallace Thurman" – 4:22
3. "Pensieroso" – 1:01
4. "Masai" – 1:04
5. "Sttretta" – 1:40
6. "Chalk Circle - Blue" – 2:39
7. "Shadowland" – 6:25
8. "Spaces" – 1:18
9. "The Cloisters" – 2:06
10. "Chromma" – 1:34
11. "Sketch For Ernie Chritchlow" – 3:56
12. "More Than Something" – 1:36
13. "Manuscripts For Fathers & Sons" – 4:22
14. "Poemm Per I Delicati" – 1:48
15. "Circle Chalk - Red" – 5:26
16. "Hush" – 3:59

=== Disc 5 ===
1. "Relay - Dance #1" – 9:41
2. "Relay - Dance #3" – 2:10
3. "Relay - Dance #4" – 2:45
4. "Relay - Dance #5" – 3:21
5. "Relay - Dance #6" – 4:35
6. "Relay - Dance #7" – 6:20
7. "Relay - Dance #8" – 5:53
8. "Relay - Dance #2" – 1:47
9. "Chiasmus" – 7:17
10. "Shards" – 1:50
11. "Pasquinade" – 6:00

=== Disc 6 ===
1. "Introduction To The Questions" – 1:03
2. "How Do You Call The Music You Play?" – 6:26
3. "Does Your Music Express A General Conception?" – 1:54
4. "Do You Think Before Or During Improvisation?" – 0:47
5. "Is Swing Important?" – 0:45
6. "Do You Enjoy Playing?" – 1:08
7. "Is Beauty Your Goal?" – 0:36
8. "What Is Freedom In Music?" – 2:28
9. "Are You Able To Make A Living From Music?" – 0:54
10. "What Would You Like To Do In The Near Future?" – 2:08
11. "How Do You See The Future?" – 2:05
12. "Odyssey Preface" – 2:19
13. "Teaching" – 14:25
14. "The Solo" – 0:32
15. "The Odyssey Solo Work" – 2:42
16. "Teaching In Madison, 1971-72" – 11:57
17. "Genesis Of The Solos" – 3:45
18. "Solos: Craft And Language" – 1:35
19. "Solos: Notation And Spatiality" – 3:19
20. "Solos: Composing Oneself And Composition" – 3:25
21. "Solos: Philosophy And Communication" – 4:25
22. "Conclusion" – 1:46

== Personnel ==
- Bill Dixon – trumpet, flugelhorn, piano, voice
- Lawrence Cook – percussion (disc 1, track 12)
- David Moss – percussion (disc 1, track 12)
- William R. Dixon, II – voice (disc 1, tracks 7–9)
- Leslie Winston – keyboards (disc 2, track 8)
