= Musica Orbis =

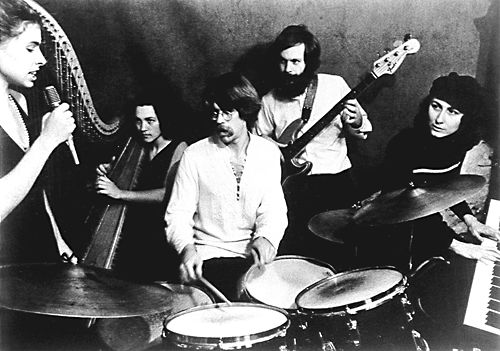
- Kitty Brazelton, Caille Colburn, Tom Stephenson, David Clark, Susan Gelletly. Photo by Tom Sherman, 1975

Background information
- Origin: Philadelphia
- Genres: Chamber music
- Years active: 1972-1979

Musica Orbis was an American electric chamber music quintet based in Philadelphia, performing between 1972 and 1979. Instrumentation included voices, harp, flute, cello, acoustic and electric bass, drums, marimba, vibes, synthesizer, organ, pump organ, knee harp, wooden recorder, bells, hand percussion, Fender Rhodes, and piano.

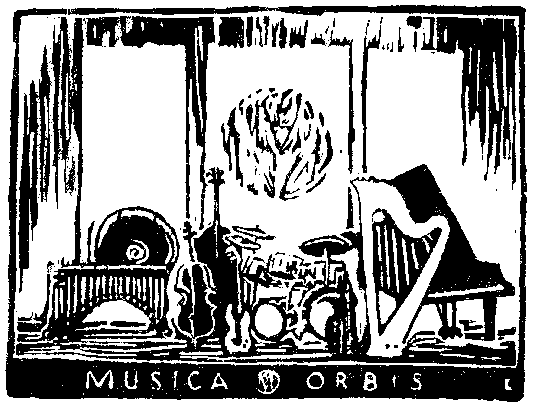
Woodcut of Musica Orbis instruments onstage

== Formation and debut ==
Musica Orbis was founded in late spring 1972 by singer/songwriter Kitty Brazelton and Tom Stephenson (percussion, cello) on the Swarthmore College campus. Susan Gelletly (keyboards) and Caroline "Caille" Colburn (harp) then joined, followed by David Clark (percussion), James J. Kelly (guitars) and William Pastuszek Jr. (saxophones & bass). The group debuted as a septet on April 15, 1973, in Bond Hall on the Swarthmore College campus.

Before their official debut, they opened for jazz-rock Good God and Blue Öyster Cult in Clothier Hall, Swarthmore College in March 1973. In fall 1973 Musica Orbis reduced from septet to quintet with Brazelton, Clark, Colburn, Gelletly and Stephenson remaining.

In the winter of 1974–1975, the quintet accompanied the Group Motion Multimedia Dance Theater and later performed at Wilma Project, the Painted Bride, The Bijou, Annenberg Center on the Penn campus. The Irvin R. Glazer Theater Collection, Philadelphia Athenaeum, shows a photo of the old Bandbox Theatre with a marquee: "CONCERT BY MUSICA ORBIS/NEW YEARS DAY FIVE PM". The song "William" was composed in 1975 for Musica Orbis by Kitty Brazelton.

== 1976–1977, New York and Boston ==
Musica Orbis organized a dawn concert on the Delaware River on June 13, 1976. The band then began to play in New York and Boston, drawing reviews in Billboard, The New York Times, Boston Phoenix and elsewhere.

Cambridge's The Real Paper featured Musica Orbis as "Band of the Month" in April 1976.

Writer Mike Baron, Mather House Music Society, Harvard University, hosted the band's sold out May 1 appearance at Sanders Theater in Harvard Square, Cambridge.

Musica Orbis played in the Chapel at St. Bartholomew's Episcopal Church (New York City), off-off-Broadway Cubiculo Theatre and the downtown club CBGB.

=== LP "To the Listeners" ===
In 1977 Musica Orbis released its LP "To the Listeners" on its own label, Longdivity. The original record had a fold-out jacket and, if bought directly from the group, the LP was accompanied by a signed certificate. Because the LP sold 5000 copies independently, "To the Listeners" was picked up for distribution by Rounder Records. LPs manufactured by Rounder have a simple sleeve and outer cover art only, no color.

== 1977–1979, U.S. ==
=== National tours ===
During 1977 and 1978, after the LP's release, the band was booked on four national tours with concert dates in 25 states, as well as TV appearances and radio broadcasts. They traveled in caravan with a mobile home, cook/road manager, sound and lights. Original member keyboardist Susan Gelletly left in 1977 and was replaced by pianist Bob Loiselle and later, guitarist Bill Mauchly added to create a sextet.

=== Breakup ===
After a season of farewell concerts, Musica Orbis disbanded in 1979.
