= Papyrus Volume I =

Studio album by Bill Dixon
- Released: January 11, 2000
- Recorded: 22 & 23 June 1998; Mu Rec Studio, Milano
- Genre: Jazz
- Length: 78:42
- Label: Soul Note; 121 308
- Producer: Giovanni Bonandrini

Bill Dixon chronology
Vade Mecum II (1996)	Papyrus Volume I (2000)	Papyrus Volume II (2000)

Papyrus Volume I is an album by American jazz trumpeter Bill Dixon recorded in 1998 and released on the Italian Soul Note label.

== Reception ==
Professional ratings
Review scores
Source	Rating
All About Jazz	4.5/5 stars
AllMusic	4.5/5 stars
The Penguin Guide to Jazz Recordings	3/4 stars
Tom Hull – on the Web	B+

In his review for AllMusic, Steve Loewy states "All 12 pieces are fully improvised, yet filled with melodic wonders. The music requires the listener to pay close attention, but the rewards are there." At All About Jazz Glenn Astarita observed "On Papyrus Volume I Dixon and Oxley provide the listener with a series of miniatures that go straight to the heart as though the twosome were transfixed in some sort of mystical aura. Overall, the music represented here resides on an elevated plane, which becomes noticeable from the onset. Simply stated, Dixon and Oxley are a stunning duo as the music shuns classification!". JazzTimes' Peter Margasak said "While some of Dixon's work takes the form of achingly gorgeous melodies that float like finely etched clouds over Oxley's jagged architecture, more often than not he's wringing a dazzling wealth of coloristic sounds and textures from his horn, playing its mouthpiece or a microphone as much as he plays the trumpet itself. By now his vast catalog of noises and effects, many of them altered with thick electronic reverb, has been well-documented-evocative smears, blurts, blubbers, grunts and sibilant streams of air-but Dixon's ability to shape them all into something musical remains an astonishing feat of magic. Oxley is that rare kindred spirit who only enhances Dixon's playing".

== Track listing ==
All compositions by Bill Dixon except as indicated

1. "Essay Di Larry Neal" - 4:02
2. "Papyrus" - 7:33
3. "The Statesman" (Bill Dixon, Tony Oxley) - 9:11
4. "Indiriszzo: Via Cimarosa Set" - 3:46
5. "Scibbles" - 3:18
6. "Ritratto Di Allen Polite" - 2:31
7. "Cinnamon" - 8:15
8. "Quadro Di Henry Dumas" - 2:36
9. "Palimpsest" - 12:20
10. "Steps" - 6:39
11. "Sine Qua Non #1" - 6:54
12. "Quadro Di N.H. Pritchard" - 1:37

== Personnel ==
- Bill Dixon - trumpet, piano
- Tony Oxley - drums, percussion
