= Nocturnal Walks =

Franz Koglmann's music composition

Nocturnal Walks is a musical composition by Franz Koglmann commissioned by the Romanian city of Sibiu to celebrate its being the European Capital of Culture in 2007. The instrumentation of the piece includes flutes, oboe, English horn, clarinet, bassoon, contrabassoon, two trumpets, flugelhorn, trombone, tuba, two violins, viola, cello, accordion, drums and vibraphone to be played live, together with a recording of Sibiu native philosopher Emil Cioran (interviewed in Paris by Alfred Koch, whose voice is not used in the composition). Koglmann also quotes from a symphony by Haydn, exemplifying third stream.

The piece is divided into eight sections:

1. Cioran talks about scepticism
2. Riffing on Haydn
3. Cioran reminisces about a garden by the cemetery
4. Cioran recalls he didn't find school terribly interesting
5. More take-offs on Haydn
6. Cioran critiques Christianity
7. Cioran talks about his insomnia, and how he takes walks at night
8. Cioran defines aphorisms

The piece was recorded in 2007, with Koglmann himself on flugelhorn and Peter Burwik conducting the 20th Century Ensemble. The next year it earned him the Ernst Krenek Prize.
