= The Tree of Life (Cecil Taylor album) =

Live album by Cecil Taylor
- Released: 1998
- Recorded: March 19, 1991
- Venue: Berlin Opera House
- Genre: Free jazz
- Length: 73:17
- Label: FMP

Cecil Taylor chronology
Melancholy (1991)	The Tree of Life (1998)	Duets 1992 (2019)

The Tree of Life is a live album of a solo piano concert by Cecil Taylor recorded at the Berlin Opera House on March 19, 1991, and released on the FMP label.

== Reception ==
Professional ratings
Review scores
Source	Rating
AllMusic	4/5 stars
The Penguin Guide to Jazz	4/4 stars

The AllMusic review by Thom Jurek states "In all, The Tree of Life is a fine showcase of the musician Cecil Taylor was in 1990. He was an artist at the crossroads of his own inspirations, looking to open new vistas both creatively and intellectually to audiences who had forgotten him or were encountering him for the first time."

The authors of the Penguin Guide to Jazz Recordings included the album in its suggested "core collection", and called it "a gorgeously lyrical and handsomely realized recital... one of Taylor's most sheerly enjoyable records." They commented: "For readers who aren't prepared to entertain the pianist on the basis of the sheer amount of work involved... this might even be the record to start with. It's no great departure for the man, 70 minutes or so of often rapt and sometimes even quizzical playing, and it tends towards the distilled feel of much of his latter-day music: having got much of the thunder behind him, or having the means to explore it via his larger groupings, by himself he seems content to sit and muse on aspects of a voluminous art. And this is the result."

== Track listing ==
All tracks are written by Cecil Taylor.

No.	Title	Length
1.	"Period 1"	1:08
2.	"Period 2"	44:28
3.	"Period 3"	21:29
4.	"Period 4"	3:41
5.	"Period 5"	2:41

== Production ==
Recorded at the Berlin Opera House on March 19, 1991

== Personnel ==
- Cecil Taylor – piano, voice
