= Envoi (album) =

Live album by Bill Dixon
- Released: 2011
- Recorded: May 22, 2010; Victoriaville, Canada
- Genre: Jazz
- Length: 53:05
- Label: Victo
- Producer: Bill Dixon

Bill Dixon chronology
Tapestries for Small Orchestra (2009)	Envoi (2011)

Envoi is an album by American jazz trumpeter Bill Dixon, which was recorded live at the 2010 edition of the Festival International de Musique Actuelle de Victoriaville and released on the Canadian Victo label. Dixon reassembled the nonet previously employed on Tapestries for Small Orchestra. It was his last concert, which took place less than a month before he died. Dixon’s failing health required that his solos were prerecorded and played back during the performance.

== Reception ==
Professional ratings
Review scores
Source	Rating
All About Jazz	4.5/5 stars

The Musicworks review by Stuart Broomer states "The music initially suggests the cutting cry of Miles Davis’s Sketches of Spain but moves subtly and constantly through a series of phases that further exploit the sombre side of trumpet sonority... By the final explosion of collective improvisation, it's telling how much distance has been covered in Envoi's two long movements."

Dave Sumner, writing for Bird is the Worm, commented: "Ominous throaty notes like voices calling out from deep beneath the sea, the unnerving pitter-patter of drumsticks that grow closer then fade with a crash of cymbals, cello like a haunting wind gusting amongst the trees, bursts of vibes like moonlight cutting through darkened clouds... and then, like the first hint of sunlight, the high call of trumpet and a promise of hope and safety. Dixon's music is signified by emotionally incendiary cross-currents... Bill Dixon continued recording up 'til the very end. His final work possesses all of the punch of earlier albums, and provides every reason to celebrate this recording while also contemplating jazz's loss."

In an article for The Village Voice, Francis Davis wrote: "Sporadically clamorous but more often flat-out lovely, and chamber-like rather than orchestral despite its five horns..., Envoi is a fitting valedictory statement—reminiscent of Ives as well as Miles Davis and Gil Evans here and there..."

Writing for The Squid's Ear, Florence Wetzel remarked: "Releases by Dixon have always been cause for celebration, and that's particularly true now with Envoi... Overall Envoi is a stunningly beautiful work that the listener will return to again and again... Foreground and background shift constantly as the brass drops back and the rhythm section moves forward, and beautiful melodic lines often end abruptly or dissolve into distortion. Dixon has created a field of sound where just about anything can emerge, and as each section unfolds the listener is entranced by the harmonic interweaving, and enfolded into the music's profound emotional depths... Envoi is an indispensable release. Period."

Ed Hazell, in a review for Moment's Notice, wrote: "The sound world is one that Dixon created again and again, but the events still sound fresh and full of wonder for the infinite possibilities of music. Dixon makes great use of sonic extremes, pitting very high trumpets against very low bass and contrabass clarinet with nothing occupying the space between them. It is music of immense clarity and power... there is a sense of Dixon as an orchestral composer of large architectures that establish distinct boundaries for improvisation, but allow freedom of movement with its walls... To the end, Dixon was a master of drama, unwilling to be anything other than unsentimental and absolutely honest, and unwavering in his vision."

== Track listing ==
All compositions by Bill Dixon

1. "Envoi - Section I" - 24:31
2. "Envoi - Section II" - 27:37
3. "Epilogue" - 0:57

== Personnel ==
- Bill Dixon - trumpet
- Stephen Haynes - trumpet, cornet, flugelhorn
- Taylor Ho Bynum - cornet, flugelhorn
- Rob Mazurek - cornet
- Graham Haynes - cornet, flugelhorn
- Glynis Loman - cello
- Michel Cote - contrabass clarinet
- Ken Filiano - bass
- Warren Smith - vibraphone, drums, percussion
