= Papyrus Volume II =

Studio album by Bill Dixon
- Released: September 12, 2000
- Recorded: 22 & 23 June 1998; Mu Rec Studio, Milano
- Genre: Jazz
- Length: 72:39
- Label: Soul Note; 121 338
- Producer: Giovanni Bonandrini

Bill Dixon chronology
Papyrus Volume I (2000)	Papyrus Volume II (2000)	Berlin Abbozzi (2000)

Papyrus Volume II is an album by American jazz trumpeter Bill Dixon recorded in 1998 and released on the Italian Soul Note label.

== Reception ==
Professional ratings
Review scores
Source	Rating
AllMusic	3/5 stars
The Penguin Guide to Jazz Recordings	3/4 stars
Tom Hull – on the Web	B+

AllMusic awarded the album 3 stars.

The authors of The Penguin Guide to Jazz Recordings wrote: "There are moments when trumpeter and percussionist seem to be working on different ideas... And yet, there is such a stirring thoughtfulness to Dixon's spacious solo lines that the logic carries each piece forward to a satisfactory conclusion."

== Track listing ==
All compositions by Bill Dixon except as indicated

1. "Silver Point: Jeanne Phillips" - 1:32
2. "Papyrus #2" (Bill Dixon, Tony Oxley) - 12:13
3. "Pyxis" - 4:33
4. "Squares" - 7:07
5. "Epigraphy" - 8:19
6. "Sine Qua Non #2" - 6:34
7. "Couplet" - 5:20
8. "Four: VI: 1998" - 10:23
9. "Crawlspace" - 13:14
10. "Suri-Mono: Louise Wade" - 3:04

== Personnel ==
- Bill Dixon - trumpet, piano
- Tony Oxley - drums, percussion
