= Bill Dixon in Italy Volume Two =

Studio album by Bill Dixon
- Released: 1981
- Recorded: June 11–13, 1980
- Studio: Barigozzi Studios, Milano
- Genre: Jazz
- Length: 41:10
- Label: Soul Note; SN 1011
- Producer: Giovanni Bonandrini

Bill Dixon chronology
| Considerations 1972–1976 (1981) | Bill Dixon in Italy Volume Two (1981) | Bill Dixon 1982 (1982) |

Bill Dixon in Italy Volume Two is an album by American jazz trumpeter Bill Dixon, recorded in Milan in 1980 and released on the Italian Soul Note label. The album resulted after producer Giovanni Bonandrini was so impressed by Dixon's sextet he requested them to record two albums instead of the single one that was planned.

== Reception ==
Professional ratings
Review scores
| Source | Rating |
|---|---|
| AllMusic | 4/5 stars |
| The Penguin Guide to Jazz Recordings | 3/4 stars |
| The Rolling Stone Jazz Record Guide | 3/5 stars |
| The Virgin Encyclopedia of Jazz | 3/5 stars |

In his review for AllMusic, Ron Wynn stated: "A rare date from a distinctive trumpeter whose approach, clarity of tone, and directness set him apart in the '60s."

The authors of The Penguin Guide to Jazz Recordings noted that the album is "very much in the [Cecil] Taylor line," and wrote: "Dixon doesn't feature himself that prominently, preferring to spread much of the higher voicing round the three-trumpet front line."

== Track listing ==
All compositions by Bill Dixon

1. "Sketch/Firenze" - 14:54
2. "Summer Song Two: Evening" - 7:30
3. "Summer Song Three: Aurorea/Daybreak" - 3:20
4. "Dusk" - 2:36
5. "Dance Piece: Places/For Jack and Barbara/Autumn Sequences from a Paris Diary" - 12:50

== Personnel ==
- Bill Dixon - trumpet, piano
- Arthur Brooks, Stephen Haynes - trumpet
- Stephen Horenstein - tenor saxophone, baritone saxophone
- Alan Silva - bass
- Freddie Waits - drums
