= Collection (Bill Dixon album) =

Studio album by Bill Dixon
- Released: 1985
- Recorded: 1972–76
- Genre: Jazz
- Label: Cadence Jazz Records; CJR 1024, CJR 1025
- Producer: Bob Rusch

Bill Dixon chronology
November 1981 (1982)	Collection (1985)	Thoughts (1987)

Collection is a double-LP album by Bill Dixon. It was recorded from 1972 to 1976 at Bennington College in Bennington, Vermont, and was released by Cadence Jazz Records in 1985. The album was reissued in 2000 as a double-CD set. While most of the tracks are recordings of solo trumpet pieces, one track features two percussionists and three tracks feature the voice of Dixon's young son.

All of the tracks on Collection were included in the 2001 six-CD album Odyssey: Solo Works.

== Reception ==
Professional ratings
Review scores
Source	Rating
AllMusic	3/5 stars
The Penguin Guide to Jazz	3.5/4 stars

In a review for AllMusic, Brian Olewnick wrote: "Collection serves as a fine, stark opportunity to hear the ideas of this under-recorded trumpet master... Dixon has a very painterly approach, and one can easily imagine these studies being drawn in space, their graceful lines reverberating in the air. His normal tone is mellow to the point of sounding like a flügelhorn, though he's quite capable of taking it to high and relatively abrasive extremes. More often... there's a sense of solitary, thoughtful melancholy that has more than a touch of Miles Davis... this is a good chance to hear a fascinating trumpeter displaying his ideas nakedly for the listener."

The authors of The Penguin Guide to Jazz awarded the album 3½ stars, and stated: "These mostly lo-fi recordings are a valuable record of [Dixon's] progress as a solo performer... Remarkably few come across merely as technical exercises, even when that is the presumed intention, and it's to Dixon's eternal credit that every piece... seems to have its own logic and purpose... it isn't an easy listen... but it's hugely satisfying."

== Track listing ==
All compositions by Bill Dixon.

=== Disc 1 ===
1. "When Winter Comes" – 8:05
2. "Webern Work / Study" – 1:07
3. "Tracings II" – 1:17
4. "The Long Walk" – 7:34
5. "Momenti" – 2:35
6. "Stanza" – 4:48
7. "I See Your Fancy Footwork – 1" – 7:53
8. "I See Your Fancy Footwork – 2" – 5:19
9. "I See Your Fancy Footwork – 3" – 2:49

=== Disc 2 ===
1. "Mosaic" – 0:41
2. "Albert Ayler" – 0:54
3. "Summerdance For Judith Dunn – Pt. One" – 7:46
4. "Tracings" – 8:46
5. "The Long Line" – 5:31
6. "Swirls" – 2:26
7. "Requiem For Booker Little" – 4:58
8. "Masques I" – 8:18

== Personnel ==
- Bill Dixon – trumpet
- Lawrence Cook – percussion (disc 2, track 3)
- David Moss – percussion (disc 2, track 3)
- William R. Dixon, II – voice (disc 1, tracks 7–9)
