= Oskar Aichinger =

Austrian avant-garde jazz pianist

Oskar Aichinger is an Austrian avant-garde jazz pianist from Vöcklabruck, who has lived in Vienna since 1984.

He first came to attention in Vienna in the early 1990s, working with bass clarinetist Hans Steiner. He has since collaborated with musicians such as Stefan Németh, Franz Koglmann, Hannes Enzlberger, Steinaich Irrding, Burkhard Stangl, Oswald Eggers, Achim Tang and Paul Skrepek, among many others. Together with Kristine Tornquist he wrote the opera "Das Totenschiff", which premiered in 2018.

He also wrote the book "Ich bleib in der Stadt und verreise".

== Discography ==
- Steinaich Irrding (1992). An Den Langen Lüssen. Extraplatte.
- Oskar Aichinger (1999). Poemia. Durian.
- Oskar Aichinger (2000). Elements of Poetry. Between the Lines.
- Burkhard Stangl; Oswald Eggers (2000). Venusmond. Quell.
- Oskar Aichinger (2001). To Touch a Distant Soul. Between the Lines.
- Hannes Enzlberger (2002). Songs to Anything That Moves. Between The Lines.
- Oskar Aichinger (2003). Synapsis. Between the Lines.
- Aichinger, Oskar (2008). Cosmos Lutosławski. turning sounds.
