= Kathleen Supové =

- Genres: Classical
- Occupation: Musician
- Instrument: Piano
- Website: supove.com

Kathleen Supové is an American pianist specializing in modern classical music. She has premiered the works of dozens of composers on her Exploding Piano series. Her recitals involve recitation, costume, theatrical elements such as lighting, and sets. Kathleen's intention is to augment and extend the piano recital, and to borrow from contemporary theater, film and dance to create a new context for modern classical music. She also performs works that extend the sonic world of the piano recital, by using electronics both live and pre-recorded, preparation of the piano, and playing inside the piano on the strings themselves.

As Anthony Tommasini said in the New York Times: "What Ms. Supové is really exploding is the piano recital as we have known it, a mission more radical and arguably more needed."

A partial list of the composers commissioned or premiered by Kathleen Supové: Louis Andriessen, Terry Riley, Joan La Barbara, Randall Woolf, Lainie Fefferman, Carolyn Yarnell, Eve Beglarian, Neil Rolnick, Missy Mazzoli, Nick Didkovsky, Anna Clyne, Phil Kline, Lukas Ligeti, Kitty Brazelton, Aaron Jay Kernis, Mary Ellen Childs, Marti Epstein, Dan Becker, Elaine Kaplinsky, Dafna Naphtali, Jed Distler, Nicholas Brooke, Lois V Vierk, Marita Bolles, Gene Pritsker, Robert Carl, Rob Zuidam, Belinda Reynolds, Michael Gatonska, singer/performance artist Corey Dargel, composer/video v.j. Peter Kirn, and Gameboy composer Bubblyfish.

She has appeared with The Lincoln Center Festival, The Philip Glass Ensemble, Bang On a Can Marathon, Music at the Anthology, Composers' Collaborative, Inc., and at many other venues, ranging from concert halls such as Carnegie to theatrical spaces such as The Kitchen to clubs such as The Knitting Factory and The Cutting Room.

Besides being a soloist, Kathleen is a member of the Nick Didkovsky's art-rock band Dr. Nerve. She also curates Music With A View, a free music + discussion series at The Flea Theater.

== Education ==
M.M., The Juilliard School; B.A., Pomona College. Piano studies with Daniel Pollack, Rosina Lhévinne, Josef Raieff, Russell Sherman.
