= Opium (Bill Dixon, Franz Koglmann, and Steve Lacy album) =

Compilation album by Bill Dixon, Franz Koglmann, and Steve Lacy
- Released: 2001
- Recorded: April 26, 1973; December 19, 1975; August 6, 1976
- Studios: Mueller Sound Studio, Vienna; Acousti, Paris; Studio Heinz, Vienna
- Genre: Free jazz
- Length: 50:59
- Labels: Between the Lines btl 011

Opium is a compilation album by trumpeter Bill Dixon, trumpeter Franz Koglmann, and saxophonist Steve Lacy. It brings together recordings that were initially issued on the small, obscure Pipe label, founded by Koglmann in 1973, and having a total of three releases in its catalog. Four of the album's tracks were recorded in Vienna in 1973, and originally appeared on the 1973 LP Flaps, credited to Koglmann and Lacy. The remaining tracks, recorded in Paris and Vienna during 1975 and 1976, are from the 1977 LP Opium for Franz, credited to Koglmann and Dixon. Opium was released in 2001 by the German label Between the Lines, and was remastered from copies of the two LPs, as the original tapes had been lost.

According to Koglmann, the Flaps album came about after he heard Lacy live in Paris in 1971 and invited the saxophonist to join him on his first record. He recalled: "I loved his introspection... I thought: 'Here's the Chet Baker of free jazz!'" Following the release of Flaps, Koglmann sent a copy to Dixon, who was impressed, and agreed to record with him, resulting in Opium for Franz.

In 2019, Flaps and Opium for Franz were reissued by the Black Monk label.

== Reception ==
Professional ratings
Review scores
Source	Rating
AllMusic	4/5 stars
The Penguin Guide to Jazz	3/4 stars

In a review for AllMusic, Steve Loewy wrote: "Each track is filled with treasures. The rare opportunity to hear Lacy and Koglmann together is an absolute treat, fulfilling expectations, while the unusual pairing of Dixon and Koglmann on trumpet... is also a treasure."

The authors of The Penguin Guide to Jazz Recordings called Dixon's "For Franz" "a significant statement."

Dan Warburton of Paris Transatlantic commented: "Koglmann's alert and responsive playing... still sounds remarkably fresh... Geier's electronics... sound delightfully wacky... Silva's bass work... is mind-blowing, and the contributions of Dixon himself and frequent collaborator Steve Horenstein on tenor are as fresh and challenging today as they were a quartet of a century ago."

Writing for JazzWord, Ken Waxman commented: "If you're looking for a new look at Koglmann — and unjustly 'lost' excellent work from two American masters — head out to find Opium. It will only be addictive in that it will encourage you to find other sessions by these artists."

In an article for La Folia, Steve Koenig remarked: "The formidable Koglmann... goes horn to horn with trumpeter Bill Dixon on Dixon's long track... As the tapes were missing, these are from some worn but not scratched LPs. With music this tight, I wouldn't care if the provenance were wartime shellacs."

Regarding Dixon's "For Franz," Mark Corroto of All About Jazz wrote: "As with much of Dixon's and Koglmann's music, the mode is cinematic. Dixon arranges the parts to mix melody with meditations, solos vault into the composition and recede. Fans of Dixon's later work will hear the early seeds planted here."

== Track listing ==
1. "Der Vogel / Opium" (Franz Koglmann) – 6:41
2. "Carmilla" (Franz Koglmann) – 4:58
3. "For Franz" (Bill Dixon) – 17:04
4. "Flops" (Steve Lacy) – 5:11
5. "Bowery 1" (Franz Koglmann) – 5:42
6. "Bowery 2" (Franz Koglmann) – 5:03
7. "Flaps" (Steve Lacy) – 6:19
- Tracks 1 and 2 were recorded at Acousti, Paris, on December 19, 1975. Track 3 was recorded at Studio Heinz, Vienna, on August 6, 1976. Tracks 4–7 were recorded at Mueller Sound Studio, Vienna, on April 26, 1973.

== Personnel ==
Tracks 1 and 2

- Franz Koglmann – flugelhorn
- Steve Lacy – soprano saxophone
- Josef Traindl – trombone
- Cesarius Alvim Botelho – bass
- Aldo Romano – drums

Track 3

- Bill Dixon – trumpet
- Franz Koglmann – trumpet
- Steve Horenstein – tenor saxophone
- Alan Silva – bass
- Walter M. Malli – percussion

Tracks 4–7

- Franz Koglmann – trumpet, flugelhorn
- Steve Lacy – soprano saxophone
- Toni Michlmayr – bass
- Walter M. Malli – percussion
- Gerd Geier – electronics
