= Thoughts (album) =

Studio album by Bill Dixon
- Released: 1987
- Recorded: May 16, 1985; Paul Robeson House - Bennington College, Bennington, VT
- Genre: Jazz
- Length: 44:25
- Label: Soul Note; SN 1111
- Producer: Giovanni Bonandrini

Bill Dixon chronology
| Collection (1985) | Thoughts (1987) | Son of Sisyphus (1990) |

Thoughts is an album by American jazz trumpeter Bill Dixon recorded in 1985 and released on the Italian Soul Note label.

== Reception ==
Professional ratings
Review scores
| Source | Rating |
|---|---|
| AllMusic | 4/5 stars |
| The Penguin Guide to Jazz Recordings | 3/4 stars |
| The Rolling Stone Jazz & Blues Album Guide | 2.5/5 stars |

In his review for AllMusic, Scott Yanow stated "The music (six originals, including the four-part suite "For Nelson and Winnie") is quite adventurous, yet thoughtful, disturbing without being forbidding."

The authors of The Penguin Guide to Jazz Recordings noted that "Dixon's playing is at a discount, though his silences are resonantly meaningful too." However, they cautioned that the album "drifts off into inconsequential and sometimes pretentious ramblings."

== Track listing ==
All compositions by Bill Dixon

1. "Thoughts" - 11:20
2. "Windows" - 4:40
3. "For Nelson and Winnie" -18:53
4. "A Song for Claudia's Children" - 11:10
5. "Brothers" - 8:30
6. "Points" - 8:45

== Personnel ==
- Bill Dixon - trumpet, flugelhorn, piano
- John Buckingham - tuba
- Marco Eneidi - alto saxophone
- Peter Kowald, William Parker, Mario Pavone - bass
- Lawrence Cook - drums
