= Taylor/Dixon/Oxley =

Live album by Cecil Taylor, Bill Dixon, Tony Oxley
- Released: 2002
- Recorded: May 19, 2002
- Venue: Festival International de Musique Actuelle de Victoriaville
- Genre: Free jazz
- Label: Les Disques Victo
- Producer: Mario Gauthier

Taylor/Dixon/Oxley is a live album by pianist Cecil Taylor, trumpeter Bill Dixon, and drummer Tony Oxley. It was recorded on May 19, 2002 during the Festival International de Musique Actuelle de Victoriaville in Victoriaville, Quebec, and was released in 2002 by Les Disques Victo.

== Reception ==
Professional ratings
Review scores
Source	Rating
AllMusic	3/5 stars
The Penguin Guide to Jazz Recordings	2.5/4 stars
Tom Hull – on the Web	B+

In a review for AllMusic, François Couture wrote: "there was no revelation that evening. Critics who usually complain that Taylor sounds like he is paid by the note might point out that this time he lacked stamina or involvement (there's no pleasing critics). The fact is that both Taylor and Oxley sound like they open up their playing, deliberately refraining from engaging in a race up the density ladder, all in order to leave room for Dixon's sparse, echo-drenched punctuations. Despite their efforts, the trumpeter does not feel quite at ease. Less talkative than usual, he plays little and contributes even less to the group improvisation. All that being said, this CD... remains an interesting listen, a good average session. Fans of any or all of these living legends will not want to pass it up, especially since it was recorded by the talented engineers at Radio-Canada. It just proves that sometimes the sum of a group does not equal the value of its parts."

Kurt Gottschalk, writing for All About Jazz, commented: "the music played that night was intimate, even delicate. It still seems that Dixon didn't quite sit down at the table with his mates, and his electronic effects don't do him any favors, but credit seems due to him for keeping the set at an unusual slow burn. There aren't the displays of pyrotechnics evidenced in Taylor and Oxley's duo performances. Instead, piano and drums dance lightly around the trumpet's background wash, creating a music both sparse and dense... Ultimately, the disc is an important chapter in Taylor's extensive, challenging discography. Do all Cecil Taylor CDs sound the same? Well, no. But how they differ, with the exception of instrumentation, is hard to pin down. But here is a different, and beautiful, mood from the master."

In an article for Burning Ambulance, Phil Freeman stated that the "set was truly shocking, because Taylor was not the dominant player. Dixon was. His swirling, smeared, electronically processed trumpet set the tone, and the other two men worked around him, keeping the mood suspenseful as the audience awaited an eruption that never came. I find the recording of that concert to be one of the most beautiful in Taylor's entire discography, but to this day there are people who hate it."

== Track listing ==
All compositions by Cecil Taylor, Bill Dixon, and Tony Oxley.

1. "B + T + C" - 41:55
2. "T ÷ C x B" - 7:41
3. "C x B x T + T" - 1:21

Recorded on May 19, 2002 during the Festival International de Musique Actuelle de Victoriaville in Victoriaville, Quebec.

== Personnel ==
- Cecil Taylor – piano
- Bill Dixon – trumpet, bugle
- Tony Oxley – drums, percussion
