= Kitty Brazelton =

American musician

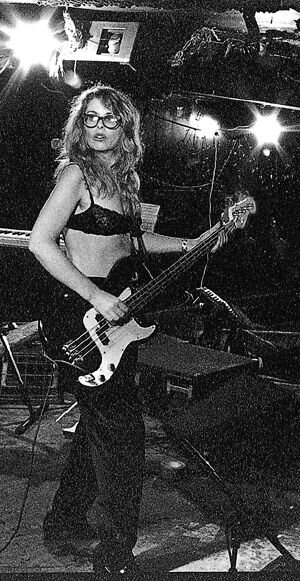
- Brazelton in 1997

Background information
- Born: October 5, 1951 (age 74); Cambridge, Massachusetts
- Instruments: Voice, flute, bass, piano
- Years active: 1970s – present
- Website: kitbraz.info

Catherine B. Brazelton (born 1951 in Cambridge, Massachusetts) is a New York-based American composer, bandleader, improviser, singer/songwriter, and instrumentalist. She has released albums and fronted bands across varied genres, including contemporary classical, electronic music, pop, art rock, punk, and avant-garde jazz. She was awarded the 2012 Carl von Ossietsky Composition Prize for Storm, a choral setting of Psalm 104 featuring Brazelton's own retranslation. Her opera Art of Memory was awarded the 2015 Grant for Female Composers from Opera America.

== Biography ==
=== Personal life ===
Brazelton was born on October 5, 1951, in Cambridge, Massachusetts, United States. Her father was pediatrician and author T. Berry Brazelton. Brazelton attended Swarthmore College and received a doctorate in music from Columbia University in 1994.

She was formerly married to jazz critic and president of the Jazz Journalists Association Howard Mandel and currently teaches composition at Bennington College in Vermont.

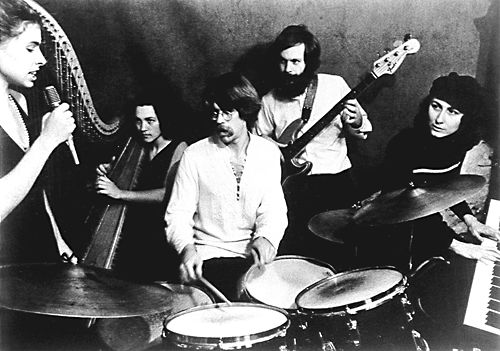
Brazelton performing in Musica Orbis in 1975

=== 1970s — Musica Orbis ===
Brazelton fronted underground psychedelic rock band Musica Orbis in the 1970s. The band played multiple national tours across the United States and released one album, To the Listeners, in 1977, before disbanding in 1979.

=== 1980s — Hide the Babies and CBGBs ===
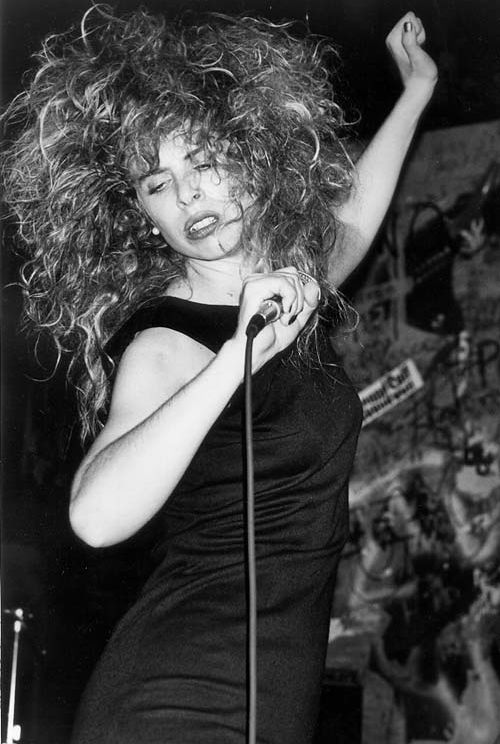
Brazelton performing with Hide the Babies at CBGB's in 1987

In the 1980s she moved to New York City and played in clubs as lead singer and songwriter of the power pop band Hide the Babies. This led to a residency at NYC concert venue CBGBs, during which Brazelton curated numerous concerts of bands and ensembles of diverse genres from the downtown NYC avant-garde scene as part of her "Real Music Series," featuring regular performances on multiple stages on Sundays at CB's Gallery.

=== 1990s — Dadadah, What is it Like to Be a Bat?, and Hildegurls ===
Brazelton founded nine-piece avant-garde ensemble Dadadah in 1990. Dadadah has released two albums, Rise Up! in 1996 and Love Not Love, Lust Not Lust in 1998. David Fricke wrote in a review of Dadadah in Rolling Stone that the band possessed "impressive nerve ... a pop-operatic pow ... orchestrated like Kate Bush kickin’ it with the Mingus Big Band." In 1991, she founded and toured with the American chamber music ensemble Bog Life, with musicians John Uehlein, Libby Van Cleve, Elizabeth Panzer, Chris Nappi, Jay Elfenbein, and Ed Broms.

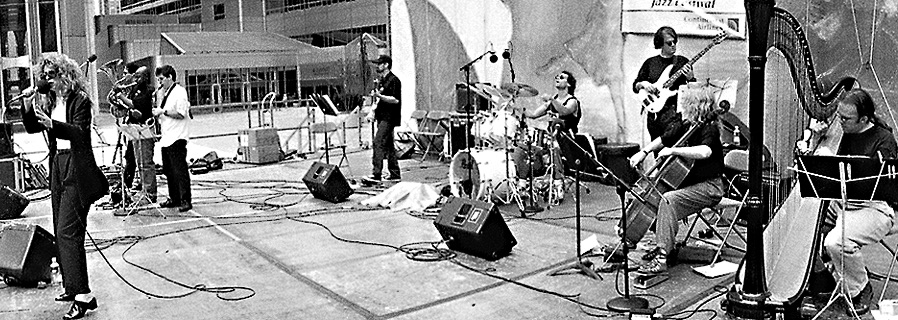
Brazelton performing with Dadadah in 1997 at the New York Jazz Festival at the World Trade Center

Brazelton co-founded electronic/punk trio What is it Like to Be a Bat? in 1995 with sound artist/composer Dafna Naphtali. In 2001, Harvestworks, with funding from NYSCA, commissioned Bat to write a 30 minute piece, which became 5 Dreams; Marriage, a set of operatic arias based on Naphtali's wedding vows.

The band released a self-titled album in 2003 on the NYC record label Tzadik Records, to critical acclaim. Bat was described by composer John Zorn as "twisted, powerful chamber rock blending a raucous punk aesthetic with vocal harmonies...complex, visionary".

Brazelton collaborated with composers Eve Beglarian, Lisa Bielawa, and Elaine Kaplinsky in 1996 as the band Hildegurls, performing electro-acoustic reinterpretations of medieval composer Hildegard von Bingen, most notably at the Lincoln Center Festival '98. The band later released an album, Electric Ordo Virtutum, in 2009, on Innova Recordings.

Sleeping Out of Doors, Brazelton's concerto for piano and orchestra, was commissioned and premiered in 1998 by Kristjan Järvi and the Absolute Ensemble, and received a grant from the American Music Center and the Margaret Jory CAP.

=== 2000s — Chamber Music for the Inner Ear, and Ecclesiastes ===
In 2002, Brazelton's album Chamber Music for the Inner Ear, a collection of 10 chamber pieces with performances from the California E.A.R. Unit and the Manhattan Brass Quintet, was released on CRI Emergency, and re-released in 2007 on New World Records. Frank Oteri wrote of her: "Brazelton, like many of these new composers, is a composer-performer, and equally at home writing a string quartet or playing in a punk rock band."

Ecclesiastes: A Modern Oratorio, an album of twelve choral works setting text from the Book of Ecclesiastes, was released in 2010 on Innova, with funding from NYFA. Brazelton used her own translation of the Hebrew text.

=== 2010s — Animal Tales and Fierce Grace ===
Brazelton's opera Animal Tales, with libretto by George Plimpton, was awarded the 2016 Grant for Female Composers from Opera America.

In 2017, Fierce Grace, a song cycle commissioned by Opera America and co-composed by Brazelton, Laura Kaminsky, Ellen Reid, and Laura Karpman, with libretto by filmmaker Kimberly Reid based on the life of Jeannette Rankin, premiered at the Library of Congress.

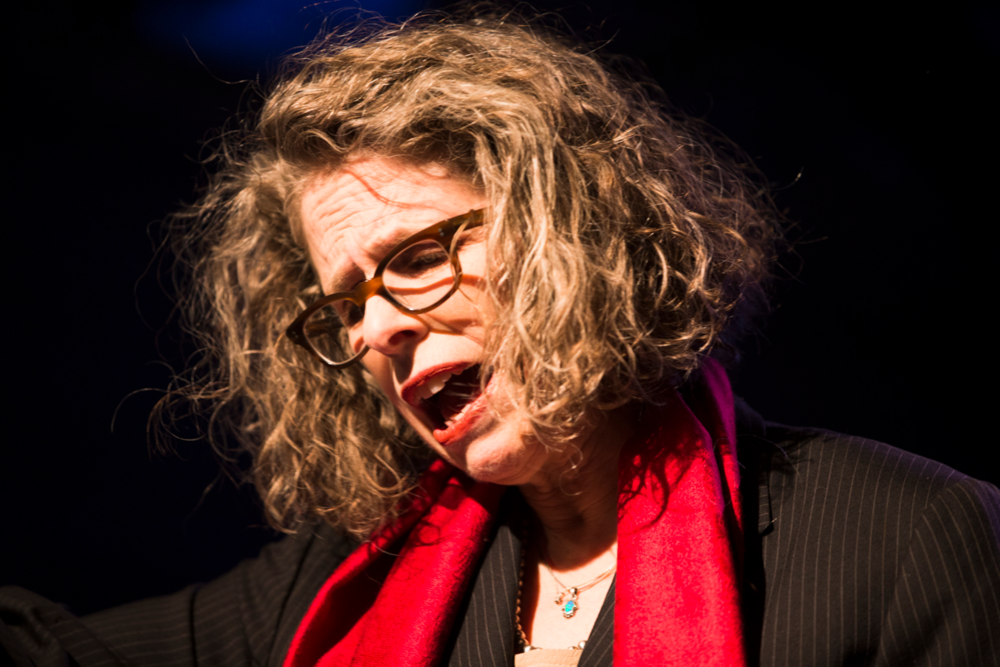
Kitty Brazelton performing in her opera The Art of Memory in 2013 at Avant Music Fest

=== 2020s — Planes of Your Location, The Art of Memory, The World is Not Ending—We've Been Here Before, and Water Memory ===
During the 2020 pandemic lockdown Brazelton began work on The World is Not Ending—We've Been Here Before, a remote collaborative project involving over 40 singers and instrumentalists. Brazelton is currently working on a new opera, The Art of Memory, based on the life of St. Augustine. The Art of Memory was awarded a NYSCA Grant for production in 2020. She is also recording a studio album, The Planes of Your Location, with LA-based ensemble Isaura String Quartet.

Her opera Water Memory will receive its premiere by The Atlanta Opera and Georgia Tech Arts in June 2026. Brazelton and the librettist Vaibu Mohan were commissioned by The Atlanta Opera to write Water Memory after winning the Antinori Foundation Grand Prize in the 96-Hour Opera Project in 2024.

== Partial Discography ==
- Musica Orbis (1977). To the Listeners. Longdivity LD1.
- Dadadah (1996). Rise Up!. Accurate Distortion 1003.
- Dadadah (1999). Love Not Love, Lust Not Lust. Buzz 76005.
- Kitty Brazelton (2002). Chamber Music for the Inner Ear. CRI Emergency 889.
- Kitty Brazelton and Dafna Naphtali (2003). What Is It Like to Be a Bat?. Tzadik 7707.
- Hildegurls (2009). Electric Ordo Virtutum. Innova Recordings 712.
- Kitty Brazelton and the Time Remaining Band (2010). ecclesiastes: a modern oratorio. Innova Recordings 727.

== List of Dadadah Personnel ==
=== Members ===
- Elizabeth Panzer, Park Stickney – harp
- Kathleen Supové — keyboard
- Chris Tso, Hui Cox, Knox Chandler – electric guitar
- Mary Wooten, Dawn Buckholz, Martha Colby – cello
- Eunice Holland, Ed Broms, Jeff Song, Roland S. Wilson, Mat Fieldes – electric bass
- James Pugliese, Todd Turkisher – drums
- Chris Washburne – trombone
- Tom Varner, Mark Taylor – French horn
- Danny Weiss, Philip Johnston, Michael Attias – alto saxophone
- Dan Grabois – French horn
- Bob Stewart – tuba, euphonium
- Butch Morris – conductor
