= Son of Sisyphus =

Studio album by Bill Dixon
- Released: 1990
- Recorded: June 28 and 29, 1988; Barigozzi Studio, Milano, Italy
- Genre: Jazz
- Length: 39:01
- Label: Soul Note; 121 138
- Producer: Giovanni Bonandrini

Bill Dixon chronology
Thoughts (1987)	Son of Sisyphus (1990)	Vade Mecum (1994)

Son of Sisyphus is an album by American jazz trumpeter Bill Dixon recorded in 1988 and released on the Italian Soul Note label.

== Reception ==
Professional ratings
Review scores
Source	Rating
AllMusic	4/5 stars
The Penguin Guide to Jazz Recordings	3.5/4 stars
The Rolling Stone Jazz & Blues Album Guide	3.5/5 stars

In his review for AllMusic, Scott Yanow states: "These lyrical explorations move forward without a pulse and, once one gets used to the "style" (or lack of), they reward repeated listenings."

The authors of The Penguin Guide to Jazz wrote: "Son of Sisyphus... is superior in almost every regard... The overriding impression is of space and movement and there's a sense in which Dixon's melancholically graceful soloing follows Cecil Taylor's much-quoted assertion that his own improvisations imitate the leaps that a dancer makes in space."

Elliott Sharp called the recording "one of [Dixon's] best albums as leader" and included it in his list "Ten Free Jazz Albums to Hear Before You Die".

== Track listing ==
All compositions by Bill Dixon

1. "Silences for Jack Moore" - 2:18
2. "Vecctor" - 1:55
3. "Son of Sisyphus" - 7:19
4. "Schema VI-88" - 3:10
5. "Fusama Codex" - 5:23
6. "Mandala per Mandela" - 3:50
7. "Sumi-E" - 2:58
8. "Negoro Codex" - 4:28
9. "Molti Molti Anni Fa..." - 7:40

== Personnel ==
- Bill Dixon - trumpet, piano
- John Buckingham - tuba
- Mario Pavone - bass
- Lawrence Cook - drums
