= Dafna Naphtali =

American musician

- Education: New York University
- Occupations: Composer; singer; guitarist
- Employer: New York University; The New School
- Awards: Guggenheim Fellowship (2023)
- Musical career
- Genres: Electroacoustic experimental music
- Instrument: Electric guitar
- Formerly of: Mechanique(s)

Dafna Naphtali is an American composer, guitarist, and singer. A 2023 Guggenheim Fellow, she formed the duo Mechanique(s) and released the album What Is It Like To Be A Bat? (2003).

== Biography ==
After spending a few years playing piano as a child, she began composing while she was a student at Stuyvesant High School. She studied at New York University, where she got a Bachelor of Music degree in jazz vocal performance and a Master of Music degree in music technology. While at NYU, she discovered Max, a MIDI software which she would later use for most of her compositions.

In November 2000, her piece Landmine was performed at Kathleen Supové and Lisa Celia's NYU concert. She and Hans Tammen formed the duo Mechanique(s); Allan Kozinn of The New York Times said that they "had the most direct ties to classical electronic experimentalism" of all the work at the 2002 Electronic X-travaganza. She performed for the electroacoustic InterAction series in February 2002. In 2003, she and Kitty Brazelton released the album What Is It Like To Be A Bat?, with Naphtali as electric guitarist and vocalist.

She was guest vocalist for Barbez's 2013 concert at (Le) Poisson Rouge. In 2023, she was awarded a Guggenheim Fellowship in Music Composition.

She worked for NYU as an adjunct faculty member, before being promoted to full-time in 2024 as a visiting professor. She is also a part-time assistant professor in music at The New School. She trained in voice pedagogy at Shenandoah University. She has also written a few book chapters and blog posts on music.
