= Bill Dixon =

American composer and educator (1925–2010)

Background information
- Born: William Robert Dixon; October 5, 1925; Nantucket, Massachusetts, U.S.
- Died: June 16, 2010 (aged 84) North Bennington, Vermont, U.S.
- Genres: Free jazz
- Occupations: Composer, visual artist, educator, musician
- Instruments: Trumpet, flugelhorn, piano
- Years active: 1960–2010
- Formerly of: Archie Shepp, Cecil Taylor

William Robert Dixon (October 5, 1925 – June 16, 2010) was an American composer and educator. Dixon was one of the seminal figures in free jazz and late twentieth-century contemporary music. He was also a prominent activist for artists' rights and African-American music tradition. He played the trumpet, flugelhorn, and piano, often using electronic delay and reverb.

== Biography ==
Dixon hailed from Nantucket, Massachusetts, United States. His family moved to Harlem, in New York City, in 1934. He enlisted in the Army in 1944; his unit served in Germany before he was discharged in 1946. His studies in music came relatively late in life, at the Hartnette Conservatory of Music (1946–1951), which he attended on the GI Bill. He studied painting at Boston University and the WPA Arts School and the Art Students League. From 1956 to 1962, he worked at the United Nations, where he founded the UN Jazz Society.

In the 1960s, Dixon established himself as a major force in the jazz avant-garde. In 1964, Dixon organized and produced the October Revolution in Jazz, four days of music and discussions at the Cellar Café in Manhattan. The participants included pianist Cecil Taylor and bandleader Sun Ra. It was the first free-jazz festival of its kind. Dixon later co-founded the Jazz Composers Guild, a cooperative organization that sought to create bargaining power with club owners and effect greater media visibility. A key participant in the seminal Judson Dance Theater at Judson Memorial Church in Greenwich Village, New York City, Dixon was one of the first artists to produce concerts mixing free jazz and improvisational dance, spending several years in a close collaboration with dancer Judith Dunn, with whom he formed the Judith Dunn/Bill Dixon Company.

In 1967, RCA Victor released Intents and Purposes, Dixon's first album as a leader. During this period, he also co-led some releases with Archie Shepp and appeared on Cecil Taylor's Blue Note record Conquistador! in 1966. In 1967, he composed and conducted a score for the United States Information Agency film, The Wealth of a Nation, produced and directed by William Greaves.

From 1968 to 1995, Dixon was Professor of Music at Bennington College, Vermont, where he founded and chaired the college's Black Music Division. From 1970 to 1976, he played "in total isolation from the market places of this music", as he puts it. Solo trumpet recordings from this period were later released by Cadence Jazz Records and were collected on his self-released multi-CD set Odyssey, along with reproductions of his visual artwork and other material.

He was one of four featured musicians in the Canadian documentary Imagine the Sound (along with Cecil Taylor, Archie Shepp, and Paul Bley), 1981.

In the later years of his life, Dixon recorded with Cecil Taylor, Tony Oxley, William Parker, and Rob Mazurek.

Dixon was noted for his extensive use of the pedal register, playing below the trumpet's commonly ascribed range and well into the trombone and tuba registers. He also made extensive use of half-valve techniques and used breath with or without engaging the traditional trumpet embouchure. He largely eschewed mutes, the exception being the Harmon mute, with or without stem.

On June 16, 2010, Bill Dixon died in his sleep, aged 84, at his home in North Bennington, Vermont, after suffering from an undisclosed illness.

== Discography ==
=== As leader ===
Year recorded	Title	Label	Year released	Personnel/Notes
1962	Archie Shepp – Bill Dixon Quartet	Savoy	1963	
1964	Bill Dixon 7-tette/Archie Shepp and the New York Contemporary 5	Savoy	1964	Split LP
1966–67	Intents and Purposes	RCA Victor	1967	
1970–73	Bill Dixon 1982	Edizioni Ferrari	1982	Limited edition LP
1972–75	Considerations 2	Fore	1981	
1970–76	Collection	Cadence	1985	
1973–76	Considerations 1	Fore	1981	
1980	Bill Dixon in Italy Volume One	Soul Note	1980	
1980	Bill Dixon in Italy Volume Two	Soul Note	1981	
1981	November 1981	Soul Note	1982	
1985	Thoughts	Soul Note	1987	
1988	Son of Sisyphus	Soul Note	1990	
1993	Vade Mecum	Soul Note	1994	
1993	Vade Mecum II	Soul Note	1996	
1998	Papyrus Volume I	Soul Note	2000	
1998	Papyrus Volume II	Soul Note	2000	
1999	Berlin Abbozzi	FMP	2000	With Matthias Bauer, Klaus Koch, Tony Oxley
1970–1992	Odyssey	Archive Editions	2001	Includes Collection, and tracks from Considerations 1 and Bill Dixon 1982
2007	Bill Dixon with Exploding Star Orchestra	Thrill Jockey	2008	
2007	17 Musicians in Search of a Sound: Darfur	AUM Fidelity	2008	live
2008	Tapestries for Small Orchestra	Firehouse 12	2009	
2010	Envoi	Victo	2011	live

=== As sideman or co-leader ===
- Cecil Taylor, Conquistador! (Blue Note, 1968) – recorded in 1966
- Franz Koglmann, Opium for Franz (Pipe, 1977) – recorded in 1976; three tracks were reissued on the compilation Opium (Between the Lines, 2001)
- The Tony Oxley Celebration Orchestra, The Enchanted Messenger: Live from Berlin Jazz Festival (Soul Note, 1995) – live recorded in 1994
- Cecil Taylor and Tony Oxley, Taylor/Dixon/Oxley (Victo, 2002) – live
- Bill Dixon/Aaron Siegel/Ben Hall, Weight/Counterweight (Brokenresearch, 2009)[2LP]
- Cecil Taylor, Duets 1992 (Triple Point, 2019) – recorded in 1992

=== As producer or composer ===
- Robert F. Pozar Ensemble, Good Golly Miss Nancy (Savoy, 1967) – producer
- Ed Curran Quartet, Elysa (Savoy 1968) – recorded in 1967. producer.
- The Marzette Watts Ensemble, The Marzette Watts Ensemble (Savoy, 1969) – recorded in 1968. producer and composer.
- Marc Levin and his Free Unit, The Dragon Suite (BYG Actuel, 1969) – producer
- Jacques Coursil Unit, Way Ahead (BYG, 1969) – composer
