= Ras Moshe =

Ras Burnett
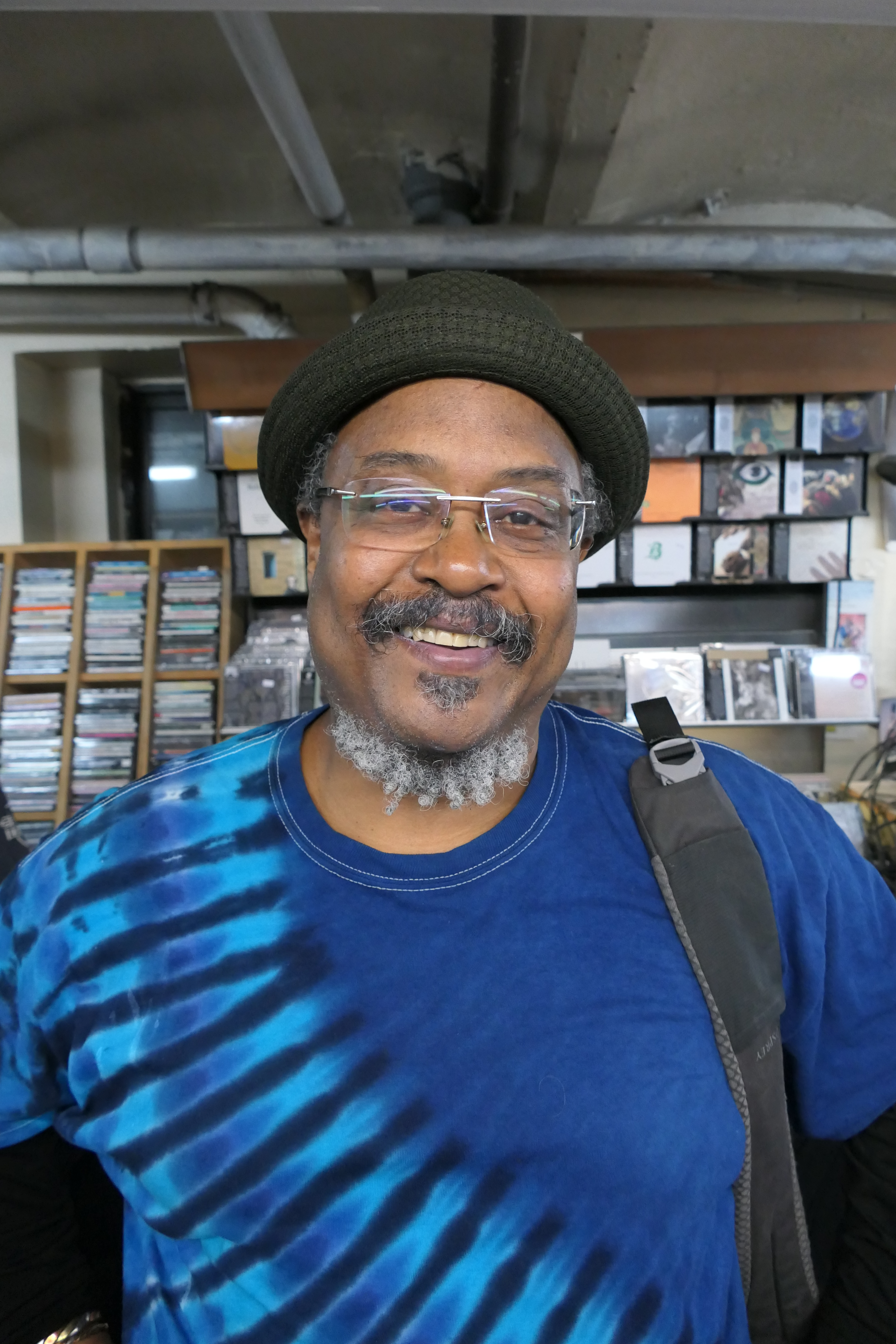
- at Downtown Music Gallery in 2025

Background information
- Born: Theodore Burnett III; March 22, 1968 (age 58); Brooklyn, New York, United States
- Genres: Jazz
- Occupations: Musician, composer, arranger, bandleader, educator
- Instruments: Tenor and soprano Saxophone, flute
- Years active: 1987–present
- Labels: Ayler, Utech, Straw2gold Pictures, KMB, 577

Theodore Burnett III (born March 22, 1968, Brooklyn, New York), who performs under the name Ras Burnett, is a composer, multi-instrumentalist specializing in saxophone and flute, musicologist and educator.

Ras comes from a musical family. His paternal grandfather, Theodore Burnett (known professionally as "Ted Barnett”) played tenor and alto saxophone with bands led by Lucky Millinder, Earl Bostic, Don Redman, Louis Armstrong, and others. Ras's father, Theodore Burnett II, also played saxophone.

"The name Ras came when I was around the Rastafarian community and playing in some reggae bands," he said in a 2014 interview. "Moshe is a name given to me when I was a little younger based on a religious conversion in the family."

== Career ==
After high school graduation, Burnett performed with African drummers and a Rastafarian band called the Drums of Freedom Troupe. He became a full-time musician in 1987.

Moshe has recorded and performed with Dafna Naphtali, Juma Sultan, The Zodiac Saxophone Quartet, Janice Lowe, Kyoko Kitamura, Melanie Dyer, Gwen Laster, Emily Lanxner, Althea SullyCole, Erika Dagnino, Amina Baraka, William Hooker, Karl Berger, William Parker, Bill Cole's Un-tempered Ensemble, Marc Edwards, Rashid Bakr, Lisette Santiago, Matt Lavelle's 12 Houses, The Red Microphone, Kali Z Fasteau and other contemporary jazz artists.

He leads the Music Now Unit, The Ras Jazz Unit and "Get Up with It", a Calypso-Jazz-Funk band.

He has recorded for the Unseen Rain, Ayler, Utech, Straw2gold Pictures, KMB, and 577 labels.

In 2005 and 2006, he released four albums on the Utech label, entitled Live Spirits, Vols. 1, 2, 3 and 4. (Volumes 1 and 2 were released under the name the Ras Moshe Music Now Unit.) The album Transcendence, by the Ras Moshe Quartet, was issued on the KMB Jazz label in 2007. In 2013, under his own name, he released the album Outsight, culled from three live New York City performances, on the Straw2Gold label.

In 2000, Ras founded the Music Now series at The Brecht Forum in Brooklyn, then at The Brooklyn Commons. The series still exists at Scholes Street Studio in Brooklyn. In the same year he joined the Neues Kabarett Collective at The Brecht Forum, presenting monthly performances of free jazz and new music.

He is a member of Bill Cole's Untempered Ensemble, for eighteen years. Also Matt Lavelle's 12 Houses Orchestra and The Red Microphone.

Ras writes and lectures about free jazz, writing liner notes for: "Al-Fatihah" By The Black Unity Trio (Salaam Records/Gotta Groove Records) and "Pharoah Sanders Quartet" (ESP Records).

In June 2018 Ras received his BA in Music Studies at SUNY/Empire State College;and in August 2023, a MFA in Music Composition from Vermont College of Fine Arts. He currently teaches Free Jazz History at The New School for Social Research.

== Discography ==
Ras Burnett "Horizon Motion" (Unseen Rain Records January 2026)

Althea SullyCole "Due West" (Chaco World Music 2025)

Ras Burnett "Celebration Conference" (Unseen Rain Records October 2024)

Ras Burnett-JD Parran-James Ilgenfritz-Nava Dunkelman-Payton MacDonald "Museum of Invisible Things" (Infrequent Seams 2023)

With William Hooker "Flesh and Blood" (Org Music 2023)

Ras Moshe Burnett Ensemble "50 Shades of May" (Tube Room Records 2021)

With Dafna Naphtali

- Fusebox (Gold Bolus Recordings, 2021)

Matt Lavelle-Ras Moshe-Tom Cabrera "Invocation" (Unseen Rain 2021)

With The Red Microphone And I Became of the Dark (ESP Records 2021), A Bleeding In Black Leather (ESP Records 2022), The Red Microphone Speaks (Dissident Arts 2012), Amina Baraka and The Red Microphone (ESP Records)

Ras Moshe Burnett and Music Now! "Live at Scholes St. Studio" (Nendo Dango records 2020)

Circle 4-Ras Moshe-Rocco John Iacovone-Tom Cabrera-Philip Sirois "Rhombus" (Unseen Rain/Woodshedd Records 2019) "Instinct" (Unseen Rain/Woodshedd Records 2019) "Spheres" (Unseen Rain/Woodshedd records 2024) "Plexus" (Unseen Rain/Woodshedd Records 2025)

Ras Moshe-Rocco John Iacovone-Philip Sirois-Tom Cabrera "Connoisseurs of Chaos V" (Unseen Rain 2019)

Nora McCarthy-Dom Minasi-Ras Moshe "Manna For Thought" (CDM Records 2017)

with Michael Moss' Accidental Orchestra "Helix" (Fourth Stream Records 2017)

With Amina Baraka and The Red Microphone "Amina Baraka and The Red Microphone" (ESP Records 2017)

With Jesse Dulman Quartet "Live at Downtown Music Gallery" (RR GEMS-03 2017)

Ras Moshe Burnett-Paula Shocron-Pablo Diaz-Matt Lavelle-Daniel Carter-Hill Greene "Cooperative Sound #3" (Nendo Dango Records 2016)

With Rocco John Iacovone's Improvisational Composers Ensemble "Peace and Love:A Tribute To Will Connell" (Unseen Rain 2016)

With Stefan Christoff

- Rêves Sonores À Alwan (Howl!, 2016)

With Matt Lavelle's 12 Houses Orchestra "Solidarity" (2016), "End Times" (2017), "The Crop Circles Suite Part 1" (2024)

With Bill Cole's Untempered Ensemble "Untempered Ensemble"(2011), "Politics-For Jayne Cortez"(2013), "SunSum"(2014) "Margaret and Katie"(2022)

as Ras Moshe Burnett

- Outsight (Straw2Gold, 2013)

With Erika Dagnino Quartet "Signs" (SLAM Records 2013)

with Dom Minasi Septet The Bird, The Girl and The Donkey (Unseen Rain 2012)

With William Parker's Essence of Ellington Big Band "Essence of Ellington-Live In Milano" (Aum Fidelity 2012)

With John Sinclair and Hollow Bones Honoring The Local Gods (Straw2Gold Records 2011)

With Marc Edwards/Weasel Walter Group "Mysteries Beneath The Planet" (ugEXPLODE-ug33 2009)

With Dave Ross, Federico Ughi

- RED RIVER FLOWS (577 Records, 2008)

Ras Moshe Quartet "Transcendence" (KMB Jazz 2007)

With Steve Swell's Nation Of We "This Business Of Here-Live at Roulette" (Cadence Jazz Records 2008)

Ras Moshe-Matt Lavelle-Todd Capp "Spark Trio! Short Stories In Sound" (Utech Records 2006)

With Walden Wimberly and His Musical Friends Octet "What The Pyramids Told Me (Not On Records 2006)

With Dom Minasi '"The Vampire's Revenge"' (CDM Records 2006)

as Ras Moshe Music Now Unit

- Live Spirits vol 1-4 (Utech Records, 2005–06)

With Jeffrey Hayden Shurdut Quintet "Allemansratten" (Ayler Records 2005)

Ras Moshe Music Now Ensemble "Schematic" (Jump Arts 004 2002)

With Matt Lavelle Quartet "Handling The Moment" (CIMP 2002)

as Ras Moshe Music Now Unit "Into The Openness" (Music Now 2001)
