= KMB Jazz =

KMB Jazz was one half of Kordova Milk Bar Records and was operated by Eric Devin from 2006 to 2012. Based in Eugene, Oregon, the label came about when Devin heard the work of the New York City collective Eye Contact (Matt Lavelle, Matthew Heyner, Ryan Sawyer). After releasing several other projects, the label ceased operations in 2012.

== Discography ==
- KMB006 Eye Contact – War Rug November 2006
- KMB007 Ras Moshe Quartet – Transcendence March 2007
- KMB010 Joe Morris – Atmosphere April 2009
- KMB012 Matt Lavelle – Cuica in the Third House June 2007
- KMB013 William Hooker/Sabir Mateen – Dharma June 2007
- KMB014 Evil Eye – Doin' It All for My Baby June 2007
- KMB015 Ideal Bread – The Ideal Bread December 2007
- KMB016 Trio Caveat – Compliments of the Season December 2007
- KMB018 Matt Lavelle's Morcilla – The Manifestation Drama March 2009

== See also ==
- List of record labels
