= November 1981 (album) =

1981 double album by Bill Dixon

Studio album / Live album by Bill Dixon
- Released: 1982
- Recorded: November 8, 16 & 17, 1981; Volkshaus, Zürich and Barigozzi Studios, Milano
- Genre: Jazz
- Length: 79:01
- Label: Soul Note; SN 1037/38
- Producer: Giovanni Bonandrini

Bill Dixon chronology
Bill Dixon 1982 (1982)	November 1981 (1982)	Collection (1985)

November 1981 is double album by American jazz trumpeter Bill Dixon consisting of one disc recorded live in Zurich and another in a studio in Milan in November 1981. It was released on the Italian Soul Note label.

== Reception ==
Professional ratings
Review scores
Source	Rating
AllMusic	3/5 stars
The Encyclopedia of Popular Music	4/5 stars
The Penguin Guide to Jazz Recordings	4/4 stars
The Rolling Stone Jazz Record Guide	3/5 stars

In his review for AllMusic, Bob Rusch states: "The music on this two-record set was typical of trumpeter Bill Dixon's hue and perhaps the most in-command set of his so far released. The first five tracks on sides one and two... struck me as rather unresolved and tedious on first listening. The last four tracks on sides three and four... grabbed me with both their immediacy and daring. Both sides impressed me with the dedication to purity which has always marked all of Dixon's music. Repeated listenings to record number one brought out greater dimensions to the music, displaying an azure mellowness which ran deep with revolving panoramas."

The authors of The Penguin Guide to Jazz awarded the album four stars out of four, and wrote that it "may be considered Dixon's small-group masterpiece, patiently conceived and executed, and generously proportioned. Dixon likes to build his ideas around silence, but these statuesque themes also use rich drones provided by the bass player... As ever, the trumpet is used quite sparingly, with the opening 'Webern'... there to underline his use of the Klangfarbenmelodie device whereby different instruments play different parts of the line and in which timbre and colour are structural principles and not just decoration."

== Track listing ==
All compositions by Bill Dixon

Side A:

1. "November 1981" -10:40
2. "Penthesilea" -10:10

Side B:

1. "The Second Son" - 5:10
2. "The Sirens" - 7:05
3. "Another Quiet Feeling" - 6:48

Side C:

1. "Announcement" - 1:13 omitted from CD rerelease
2. "Webern" - 1:24
3. "Windswept Winterset" -15:42

Side D:

1. "Velvet" - 6:44
2. "Llaattiinnoo Suite" -15:24
3. Announcement - 1:40 omitted from CD rerelease
- Sides A & B recorded November 16 & 17, 1981, at Barigozzi Studios, Milano, Italy. Sides C & D recorded live November 8, 1981, at Volkshaus, Zürich, Switzerland. The CD rerelease omits the stage announcements and programs the live tracks first.

== Personnel ==
- Bill Dixon - trumpet
- Mario Pavone, Alan Silva - bass
- Laurence Cook - drums
