= Vade Mecum II =

Studio album by Bill Dixon
- Released: 1996
- Recorded: August 2, 3 and 4, 1993; Mu Rec Studio, Milano
- Genre: Jazz
- Length: 70:05
- Label: Soul Note; 121 211
- Producer: Giovanni Bonandrini

Bill Dixon chronology
| Vade Mecum (1994) | Vade Mecum II (1996) | Papyrus Volume I (2000) |

Vade Mecum II is an album by American jazz trumpeter Bill Dixon recorded in 1993 and released on the Italian Soul Note label.

== Reception ==
Professional ratings
Review scores
| Source | Rating |
|---|---|
| AllMusic | 4.5/5 stars |
| The Penguin Guide to Jazz Recordings | 3.5/4 stars |
| The Virgin Encyclopedia of Jazz | 4/5 stars |

In his review for AllMusic, Brian Olewnick stated "It is... one of the very finest jazz albums of the '90s and one that cannot be recommended too highly."

The authors of The Penguin Guide to Jazz Recordings noted that, in relation to the first volume of Vade Mecum, volume 2 is "more coherent and cogent." They praised the "stirring thoughtfulness [of] Dixon's spacious solo lines," noting that their logic "carries each piece forward to a satisfactory conclusion."

== Track listing ==
All compositions by Bill Dixon

1. "Valentina Di Sera" - 3:07
2. "Tableau" - 10:21
3. "Ebonite" - 15:51
4. "Reflections" - 15:28
5. "Incunabula" - 13:33
6. "Octette #1" - 11:45

== Personnel ==
- Bill Dixon - trumpet, flugelhorn
- Barry Guy, William Parker - bass
- Tony Oxley - percussion
