= Intents and Purposes =

Studio album by Bill Dixon
- Released: 1967
- Recorded: October 10, 1966, January 17 & February 21, 1967
- Studio: RCA Victor's Studio B, New York City
- Genre: Jazz
- Length: 31:40
- Label: RCA Victor
- Producer: Brad McCuen

Bill Dixon chronology
Bill Dixon 7-tette/Archie Shepp and the New York Contemporary 5 (1964)	Intents and Purposes (1967)	Bill Dixon in Italy Volume One (1980)

Intents and Purposes is an album by American jazz trumpeter Bill Dixon, which was released in 1967 on RCA Victor. Despite critical acclaim at the time, it was soon out of print except for appearances in 1972 on Japanese RCA and later in 1976 on French RCA. The album was reissued on CD by International Phonograph in 2011. The album's title is an example of a Siamese twins idiomatic expression.

== Background ==
In 1966 Dixon premiered his composition "Pomegranate" at the Newport Jazz Festival with dancer Judith Dunn, and this performance led to a contract with RCA. Dixon signed with producer Brad McCuen to do a quartet piece, but instead he started working on "Metamorphosis 1962-1966", for an ensemble of ten musicians. The personnel was an unusual mix of freemen and mainstream jazzers. Pozar and Levin were Dixon's students at the time, and Lancaster and Kennyatta frequent participants in Dixon-Dunn projects.

== Reception ==
Professional ratings
Review scores
Source	Rating
AllMusic	4/5 stars
All About Jazz	5/5 stars
DownBeat	5/5 stars

In his review for All About Jazz, Troy Collins states: "Intents And Purposes has long been revered as Bill Dixon's singular masterpiece...The reissue allows the record to finally take its rightful place alongside such masterpieces as Ornette Coleman's Free Jazz, John Coltrane's Ascension and Miles Davis' Bitches Brew."

The JazzTimes review by Mike Shanley says that "The whole release compares to very little from that period and offers a stellar example of the composer’s vision".

In a 2011 Village Voice article following the CD reissue, Francis Davis wrote: "If ever a jazz LP literally qualified as 'legendary,' Intents is it... I envy anyone first hearing it now, because it's as bold and surprising as anything newly released this year."

Writing for The Vinyl District, Joseph Neff noted that the album, "if often gripping and raw is never chaotic," and commented: "Intents and Purposes' large group template combined with compositional fortitude and improvisational vigor makes it essential to any free jazz library."

Point of Departure's Ed Hazell stated: "What's apparent from the opening moments of 'Metamorphosis'... is how well Dixon grasps the dichotomies and contradictions in the music of the time and how completely he controls them... Dixon the composer expertly transitions from one theme or passage to another; his ability to shape compositions into self-contained wholes would remain a hallmark of his art."

== Track listing ==
All compositions by Bill Dixon

1. "Metamorphosis 1962-1966" – 13:20
2. "Nightfall Pieces I" – 3:47
3. "Voices" – 12:08
4. "Nightfall Pieces II" – 2:25

== Personnel ==
- Bill Dixon – trumpet, flugelhorn
- Jimmy Cheatham – bass trombone
- Byard Lancaster – alto sax, bass clarinet
- Robin Kenyatta – alto sax
- George Marge – English horn, flute
- Catherine Norris – cello
- Jimmy Garrison – bass
- Reggie Workman – bass
- Robert Frank Pozar – drums
- Marc Levin – percussion
