= Vade Mecum =

Studio album by Bill Dixon
- Released: 1994
- Recorded: August 2, 3 and 4, 1993; Mu Rec Studio, Milano
- Genre: Jazz
- Length: 77:39
- Label: Soul Note; 121 208
- Producer: Giovanni Bonandrini

Bill Dixon chronology
Son of Sisyphus (1990)	Vade Mecum (1994)	Vade Mecum II (1996)

Vade Mecum is an album by American jazz trumpeter Bill Dixon recorded in 1993 and released on the Italian Soul Note label.

== Reception ==
Professional ratings
Review scores
Source	Rating
AllMusic	4/5 stars
The Penguin Guide to Jazz Recordings	3/4 stars
The Virgin Encyclopedia of Jazz	4/5 stars
The Rolling Stone Jazz & Blues Album Guide	3/5 stars

In his review for AllMusic, Brian Olewnick states "The expansiveness and airiness of the sound here is one of this record's most striking qualities."

The authors of The Penguin Guide to Jazz Recordings called "Anamorphosis" "one of Dixon's most thoughtful conceptions," and commented: "Inside almost all of Dixon's small group recordings there is a dark pressure, like the imprint of a much larger composition that has been denied full expression. That is profoundly evident on Vade Mecum."

== Track listing ==
All compositions by Bill Dixon

1. "Moment" - 4:24
2. "Anamorphosis" - 12:29
3. "Viale Nino Bixio 20" - 9:17
4. "Pellucity"- 9:04
5. "Vade Mecum" - 15:52
6. "Twice Upon a Time" - 13:12
7. "Acanthus" - 13:25

== Personnel ==
- Bill Dixon - trumpet, flugelhorn
- Barry Guy, William Parker - bass
- Tony Oxley - percussion
