= Triangular Screen =

Live album by Tony Oxley Project 1
- Released: 2000
- Recorded: March / May 2000
- Venue: Kongsberg Jazzfestival, Kongsberg, Norway; Blå, Oslo, Norway
- Genre: Free improvisation
- Length: 48:11
- Label: Sofa; 501

Tony Oxley chronology
Digger's Harvest (1999)	Triangular Screen (2000)	Floating Phantoms (2002)

Triangular Screen is a live album by Tony Oxley Project 1, led by percussionist Oxley, and featuring guitarist Ivar Grydeland and double bassist Tonny Kluften. One track was recorded during March 2000 at the Kongsberg Jazzfestival in Kongsberg, Norway, and the remaining tracks were recorded during May 2000 at Blå in Oslo, Norway. The album was released later that year by the Norwegian Sofa label.

== Reception ==
Professional ratings
Review scores
Source	Rating
AllMusic	2/5 stars
The Penguin Guide to Jazz	2.5/4 stars

In a review for AllMusic, François Couture stated: "Anyone familiar with the drummer's recordings with Derek Bailey will feel at home here... Oxley leads throughout. His playing is as enjoyable as ever, but one wishes he would come down off his pedestal once in a while to listen more closely to what the local figures are trying to contribute to the session."

JazzWord's Ken Waxman noted that Oxley "never pulls rank when it comes to working with other musicians and dealing with their ideas," and wrote that the musicians are "interacting as trio members, not as an improviser elder statesman with two subservient acolytes."

David Lewis of Exclaim! commented: "Among the most expressive and innovative of drummers, Oxley is showcased as a master percussionist in the vibrant minimalism of this club set... From the fractal interplay of 'First Scan' to the intensifying dynamics of 'Second Scan,' this band's most satisfying arc of interplay occurs during the spacy exchanges and lyrical resolution of 'Third Scan.' The dense interplay of 'Fourth Scan' concludes this engrossing live set in dramatic fashion."

The authors of The Penguin Guide to Jazz Recordings stated that Oxley's setup "diminishes the flexibility of his response," while Grydeland and Kluften "seem content to play a relatively supportive role."

Writing for The Wire Julian Cowley remarked: "Pace and density vary, but all four pieces are highly physical, suggesting solid mobiles that disclose different facets and create unexpected temporary alignments as they turn. This is group improvisation at its purest, making sound objects that float free from ego."

In an article for Cadence, Frank Rubolino wrote: "Oxley and the trio produce near-ghoulish sequences of improvised spontaneity on this album that is stimulating through its restless thrust. It is an exciting match of kindred spirits seeking communion."

== Track listing ==
1. "First Scan" – 15:22
2. "Second Scan" – 17:35
3. "Third Scan" – 12:17
4. "Fourth Scan" – 3:42

== Personnel ==
- Tony Oxley – percussion, pre-recorded tape
- Ivar Grydeland – guitar
- Tonny Kluften – double bass
