= Joseph Holbrooke =

English composer, conductor, and pianist (1878–1958)

Joseph Holbrooke by E.O. Hoppé, 1913

Joseph Charles Holbrooke, sometimes given as Josef Holbrooke, (5 July 1878 – 5 August 1958) was an English composer, conductor, and pianist.

== Life ==
=== Early years ===
Joseph Holbrooke was born Joseph Charles Holbrook in Croydon, Surrey. His father, also named Joseph, was a music hall musician and teacher, and his mother Helen was a Scottish singer. He had two older sisters (Helen and Mary) and two younger brothers (Robert and James), both of whom died in infancy. The family travelled around the country, with both parents participating in musical entertainments. Holbrooke's mother died in 1880 from tuberculosis, leaving the family in the care of Joseph senior, who settled the family in London and took the position of pianist at Collins's Music Hall, Islington, and later at the Bedford Music Hall. Holbrooke was taught to play the piano and the violin by his father, who was not averse to the use of violence as a method of instruction, and played in music halls himself before entering the Royal Academy of Music as a student in 1893, where he studied under Frederick Corder for composition and Frederick Westlake for piano.

Whilst at the academy he composed several works, chiefly piano miniatures, songs and some chamber music, which were performed at student concerts: at one recital, he substituted one of his own compositions in preference to Schumann's Toccata, incurring the wrath of the Principal, Sir Alexander Campbell Mackenzie. He won several Academy prizes, including the Potter Exhibition for pianoforte (1895), the Sterndale Bennett Scholarship (awarded on 29 April 1896), the Heathcote Long Prize for pianoforte (1896) and, in his final year (with the Pantomime Suite for strings), the Charles Lucas Prize for composition (1897).

After graduating Holbrooke sought a variety of occupations. In 1898 he undertook a tour of Scotland accompanying the music hall singer Arthur Lloyd, but the venture failed and he was forced to return to live with his father in London. He then moved out of the family home to Harringay where he began to teach music privately, but once again without financial success. Around this time he decided to change his name from Holbrook to Holbrooke, probably in order to avoid confusion as his father was also still teaching privately. He subsequently adopted the variant Josef Holbrooke which he continued to use inconsistently throughout the remainder of his life.

Responding to an advertisement in Musical News, Holbrooke travelled to Horncastle in Lincolnshire where he briefly lived with and served as musical companion to the Reverend Edward Stewart Bengough (1839-1920). He was soon travelling again, conducting a touring pantomime (Aladdin and the Lamp) during the 1899-1900 Christmas season. Once more, the enterprise collapsed and Holbrooke was left stranded and virtually destitute, at which point Bengough sent him money to enable him to return to London.

=== Success ===
Whilst on tour, Holbrooke had sent the score of his orchestral poem The Raven to August Manns, conductor at the Crystal Palace. Manns accepted the work for performance and gave the premiere on 3 March 1900, whilst later that same year the orchestral variations on Three Blind Mice were also heard (Queen's Hall Promenade Concert, conducted by Henry Wood, 8 November 1900). In 1901 he won the Lesley Alexander Prize for chamber music with his Sextet in F minor and also received an invitation from Granville Bantock to become a member of the staff at the Birmingham and Midland Institute School of Music. He accepted the position, living with the Bantocks whilst teaching at the institution, but rapidly became dissatisfied with the routine and returned to London in 1902.

There followed a decade of prestigious commissions and performances, with notable works including the poem for chorus and orchestra Queen Mab (Leeds Festival, conducted by the composer, 6 October 1904), the orchestral poem Ulalume (Queen's Hall, conducted by the composer, 26 November 1904), the scena for baritone and orchestra Marino Faliero (Bristol Festival, conducted by the composer, 12 October 1905), the Bohemian Songs for baritone and orchestra (Norwich Festival, conducted by the composer, 25 October 1905), the poem for chorus and orchestra The Bells (Birmingham Festival, conducted by Hans Richter, 3 October 1906), the orchestral suite Les Hommages (Queen's Hall Promenade Concert, conducted by Henry Wood, 25 October 1906) and the choral symphony Homage to E.A. Poe (two movements first performed at the Bristol Festival, 16 October 1908). During this period Holbrooke also won a further prize, this time with his Fantasie Quartet, Op.17b entered for the 1905 chamber music competition initiated by Walter Willson Cobbett.

In 1907 Holbrooke was approached by the poet Herbert Trench who wished the composer to set his extended poem on immortality Apollo and the Seaman. This Holbrooke duly did, although only the final section of the poem (The Embarkation) is actually sung (by a male chorus), the rest of the score being a purely orchestral illustration of the verses. The completed work, styled "An Illuminated Symphony", was first performed at Queen's Hall on 20 January 1908, conducted by Thomas Beecham: on this occasion the orchestra and chorus were hidden from the audience behind an elaborate screen whilst the text of the poem was projected onto the screen using lantern slides at corresponding points in the music. The rehearsals for Apollo and the Seaman were attended by Thomas Scott-Ellis, 8th Baron Howard de Walden who shortly after the first performance approached Holbrooke with one of his own poems, entitled Dylan - Son of the Wave: this resulted in the composition of the opera Dylan, first performed at the Theatre Royal, Drury Lane, London, conducted by Artur Nikisch, on 4 July 1914. The staging included another technological wonder:

"in this work, in order to get convincing flights of wild fowl, films were made in the Outer Hebrides and projected on to the stage. This, of course, was in the days of the silent film, when there was no means of deadening the whirr or hum of the projector and the films themselves resolved into a series of flicks. The scoring, however, was vivid enough to cover the sounds, and this incipient film music was infinitely more successful than some of the over-vaunted high-level scores heard to-day. The theatre, however, was not ready for such an innovation, and the extra-musical effects were not taken seriously."

Collaboration on two further operas, The Children of Don (first performed at the London Opera House, conducted by Arthur Nikisch, on 15 June 1912 - postponed from 12 June) and Bronwen, brought about the completion of Holbrooke's most ambitious project, a trilogy under the collective title The Cauldron of Annwn setting Scott-Ellis' versions of tales from the Welsh Mabinogion. Until his death in 1946, Scott-Ellis effectively acted as patron to Holbrooke, subsidising performances and publication of many of his works.

Throughout this period, Holbrooke also enjoyed a successful career as a virtuoso concert pianist. Besides his own compositions, his repertoire included the Toccata by Robert Schumann, Islamey by Mily Balakirev, Scriabin's Piano Sonata No.1, the fantasie Africa for piano and orchestra by Saint-Saëns, Tchaikovsky's Piano Concerto No.1 and Rachmaninoff's Piano Concerto No.2.

=== Controversy ===
In 1902 Holbrooke had begun his own series of chamber music concerts to promote his music alongside new works by his British contemporaries. Audiences would regularly find admonishing notes printed in their programmes:

"Mr. JOSEF HOLBROOKE steps forward somewhat adventurously with his 12th year of endeavour for some Modern English Music to an apathetic public, and hopes to receive as few blows as possible (with the usual financial loss) in return."

"While our good English musicians in power with fine orchestras and much money are pummelling to their utmost ability the down-trodden and unrecognised gifts (!) of Richard Strauss and his brethren abroad, we, in our small way, and where we can, try to leaven matters by writing out cheques and playing our own music to recalcitrant audiences! It is to be regretted that the Reger Pianoforte Quintet announced for this concert was found so long and turgid that we had to put it aside, in case it met with the sad fate of serious English music. We have found a place for more interesting native work and saved Mr. Reger's reputation, which, with Mr. Strauss, is sacred in this country."

When war broke out in 1914 he turned his attention to vigorously denouncing both the lack of support given to British music and the continued favour afforded to that of other countries, especially Germany. He published a series of five essays entitled British Music Versus German Music which appeared weekly in The New Age between 5 November and 3 December 1914:

"The British people have ever listened to the alien, as in the days of Handel, and the critic (although not a villain!) is always ready with his enthusiasm, in large type, for Tetrazzini, Caruso, Busoni, Strauss, Puccini, Nikisch, Campanini, Van Rooy, Stravinski, Chaliapine, Debussy, Pavlova, Karsavina, Nijinski, Mengelberg, Steinbach, Schönberg, Savonoff, Paderewski, Elman, and a few other aliens! These are the 'gods' I am mentioning, the gods of the British people."

"In a recent disclosing [...] I gave actual instances of the orchestras I had personally given concerts with in London, costing me many hundreds of pounds. My sole reward for this is to find them, the orchestras I engaged, united in ignoring, year after year, my works, until, I imagine, more money is forthcoming to spend on more performances!"

"the despicable members of the music profession are encouraged to play German music by an absolutely indifferent audience. One wonders if any of such people have lost their sons or husbands at the front, or is it that the bulk of our music lovers 'do not fight.'"

The personal tone which informed much of the writing was too strong for some commentators who saw it as blatant self-promotion:

"I may be forgiven for reading between his lines. I am tempted to think that Mr. Holbrooke is only discussing his own grievances against the English public, and that the real heading of his articles should be 'Holbrooke's v. German or any other music.'"

"It is a little depressing to watch Mr. Holbrooke endeavouring, week after week, to precipitate Music into the dismal cesspool of Chauvinism that is already full to overflowing. [...] Mr. Holbrooke's position is analogous to that of the street-minstrel. It is as though the penny-whistler on the kerbstone were suddenly to belabour with his instrument all the passers-by who did not instantly lose the purpose of their passing-by in a passion of wonder and ecstasy at the sound of his piping. [...] Not all British composers have yet sunk into the mire of sordid commercialism, wherein Mr. Holbrooke would have them fellow-wallowers with himself, nor are they all intoxicated with those quixotic notions of nationalism that have caused Mr. Holbrooke to waste so much breath in spluttering invective against a public that persists in believing that Art is one, and life too short for futile arguments about its nationality."

The fact that Holbrooke had recently issued a number of works under a pseudonym was also seized upon and viewed with suspicion:

"I should like to ask Mr. Holbrooke to explain why, for all his patriotism, he has recently thought fit to publish several of his works under the name of Jean Hanze, and, in addition, to circulate a pamphlet puffing their soi-disant BELGIAN COMPOSER! - at this time, of all others, when the word 'Belgian' acts as a kind of magic formula for opening purses! One is reminded of the pavement artist who stuffed his legs through a hole in the wall, and posed as a hero who had given his legs for his country. He got several months."

Undoubtedly, Holbrooke was a difficult and prickly person to deal with professionally. Shortly before a concert in Bournemouth on 22 February 1917, where the composer was to give a performance of his piano concerto Gwyn ap Nudd, the conductor Dan Godfrey was compelled to hastily insert apology slips into each of the programmes to the following effect:

"Mr Dan Godfrey begs to announce that Mr Joseph Holbrooke declines to play today, at this concert, because his name is not announced on the bills in large enough type, consequently the programme will be changed. The Piano Concerto and Dreamland Suite will be substituted by Violin Concerto, Paganini (H E Batten) Scènes Pittoresques, Massenet."

In fact, what had annoyed Holbrooke was the greater prominence which the printed advertisements gave to Vladimir Pachmann who was due to play two days later: he felt that this was yet another instance where a foreigner was being given undue celebrity to the detriment of a native pianist. Such outbursts of pique were characteristic and he gained the reputation of a troublesome and cantankerous eccentric:

"Holbrooke's personality has also been largely responsible for the amount of opposition that he has received. He is not a man of reticences, and what his heart feels, his tongue speaks without any arrière pensée. He is fond of talking, and nobody talks much who does not say unwise things at times. Being impulsive by nature and very open in character, he is apt to commit indiscretions which he afterwards regrets. He is his own worst enemy, and is well aware of the fact."

"Josef Holbrooke, an excitable, deaf, talkative, combative musician, who lives in a solitary house in North London surrounded by ordinary Villadom, and writes there music which no one can play. It is music Wagner-like in form and Strauss-like in its intricate orchestration, almost unrecognised, except in foreign Culturedom. And Holbrooke, who composes it, is the enemy of the critics, the terror of publishers, and the intolerant hater of all that is commonplace in music. 'Holbrooke's Sauce,' they call him."

=== Neglect ===
Following the First World War, with his own music increasingly side-lined, Holbrooke continued ever more vehemently to berate his critics. A particular target was Ernest Newman, initially an enthusiast for Holbrooke's music but who latterly became cool towards the composer:

"Men of note with verbal haemorrhage write on music mostly in our daily journals. [...] What their training is for their task is not known. In any case all this writing is entirely a trade issue, for what journalism has to do with the arts is best left to the reader's judgment and imagination. Mr Ernest Newman wrote an illuminating and heart-warming set of articles years ago on our composers in The Speaker, but he now publicly repudiates his early enthusiasm!"

At the same time, Holbrooke continued to vigorously and vociferously promote compositions by other contemporary British composers both through performance at his own chamber music concerts and in print:

"At a time when little notice was taken of British composers, Holbrooke was cudgelling, even bludgeoning, in the English press and at his concerts (for he has always been fond - perhaps too fond - of prefaces oral and printed) at the apathy of the English public and the denseness of newspaper critics. He has suffered for his own sayings and vicariously for those of others; but whether we have liked his savage method of fighting or not, the battle has been won, and we must not forget those who were earliest in the field of modern British music."

Perhaps Holbrooke found some satisfaction in seeing his war-time attitude towards greater British representation in concert-halls echoed retrospectively, albeit without the same controversy:

"Recognition for British music was won at the cost of thousands of lives and millions of money. [...] Truth to tell, we had become rather centred on the one thing and inclined to think that there was only one music, and that it came from Germany. This even continued at the beginning of the war. A protest on the part of a small section of the Press did much to draw people's attention to the fact that we were honouring an enemy nation. The counter cry was raised, of course, that "Music has no nationality" and all the rest of it; but there were a thinking few who realised the injustice. I doubt if the knowledge that at the beginning of the war the German papers reproduced London concert programmes, with their rich preponderance of German music, with the sneering remark that "we couldn't do without it" had much effect. It may have been that a few right-thinking people realised that we knew very little about anything save German music [and] the idea began to germinate that possibly somewhere, somehow, there might be something different. Gradually a little more British music was heard, gradually the public became accustomed to the strange sight of a British name on a concert programme, and gradually it dawned upon the people that there was something in it."

Performances of his own music continued sporadically, but included several of great importance: The Children of Don (Die Kinder der Don) was given five times at the Vienna Volksoper under Felix Weingartner, and three times in Salzburg under Ludwig Kaiser (1876-1932), in 1923; Bronwen was first performed in Huddersfield by The Carl Rosa Opera Company on 1 February 1929 and then taken on tour; and the ballet Aucassin and Nicolette was performed over two hundred times by the Markova-Dolin Ballet Company during the 1935-36 season. Holbrooke had spent extended periods of time at Harlech, Wales, since around 1915, Scott-Ellis having provided him with a number of residences, and in the early 1920s he moved with his family to a house which he appropriately named Dylan. In the early hours of 9 November 1928, whilst the rest of the family were in London, fire broke out and the house was completely gutted: Holbrooke sustained serious head injuries and his music library was destroyed. This disaster precipitated a return to London where, having bought back many of the copyrights on his earlier works, Holbrooke set up his own publishing house "Modern Music Library", operating from his various London homes: through this outlet he ensured that his compositions remained available and also issued several printed catalogues of his works.

From about the age of forty he began to suffer problems with his hearing, eventually becoming profoundly deaf, an affliction which tended to increase his isolation and irascibility. The condition also served to curtail his career as a concert pianist: when Holbrooke revised his Piano Concerto The Song of Gwyn ap Nudd in 1923 it was for a performance given by Frederic Lamond.

A "Holbrooke Music Society" was founded in 1931 to promote the composer's works, Scott-Ellis being the patron and Granville Bantock acting as president. Until Bantock's death in 1946, Holbrooke maintained frequent correspondence with the older composer, railing against the BBC's apparent unwillingness to broadcast performances of his music. Despite his neglect by the musical establishment, Holbrooke continued to compose throughout the 1930s and 1940s, working on several large-scale projects including an opera-ballet Tamlane, two further choral symphonies, Blake and Milton, both of which were probably unfinished, and choral settings of Kipling's poetry, also unfinished. He also devoted much of his time to revising and recasting his earlier works.

Holbrooke lived at various London addresses including 22 Harringay Grove, Hornsey (c.1902-1910), Vale House, Tufnell Park (c.1910-c.1924), 60 Boundary Road, St John's Wood (c.1929-1937), 48 Boundary Road, St John's Wood (1937-1940), and 55 Alexandra Road, St John's Wood (1940-1958). Between September 1940 and March 1941, at the height of the Blitz, he moved out of London to live with friends in Taunton, Somerset, before returning to the capital permanently in the summer. He died at 55 Alexandra Road, St John's Wood on 5 August 1958 at the age of eighty and was survived by his wife Dorothy ('Dot') Elizabeth Hadfield whom he had married in 1904. The couple had five children: Mildred (born 1905), Anton (1908), Barbara (1909), Gwydion (1912) and Diana (1915), the last of whom was married to the renowned clarinettist Reginald Kell. The youngest son changed his name to Gwydion Brooke and became a pre-eminent English bassoonist, also actively promoting the music of his father through a continuation of the "Modern Music Library", renamed "The Blenheim Press".

== Music ==
Holbrooke was fascinated by the writings of Edgar Allan Poe which deal with the supernatural and the macabre, eventually producing over thirty compositions which he referred to as his "Poeana". These included orchestral works (The Raven, Ulalume, The Sleeper, Amontillado and The Pit and the Pendulum), a double concerto for clarinet and bassoon (Tamerlane), choral works (a choral symphony Homage to E.A. Poe and a poem for chorus and orchestra The Bells), a ballet (The Masque of the Red Death), a multitude of chamber works (such as the Clarinet Quintet Ligeia, the Trio Fairyland and the Nonet Irene) and several piano pieces.

During the early 1920s he became interested in writing in the new jazz idiom:

"Quite recently Mr. Josef Holbrooke, one of our greatest living composers, announced his intention of writing jazz music. He complained in his usual forcible style of the lack of appreciation for his music and the music of his contemporaries, and he then proceeded to give us an idea of the "higher" jazz music which he intends to write."

"At the instigation of Mrs Holbrooke, who alleged he was getting old, he took up dancing a few months ago. He has now reached the stage where, on the slightest provocation he will demonstrate a step for anybody anywhere. 'I've got foxtrot on the brain', said Mr Holbrooke."

He produced several foxtrots and valses for dance orchestra and, perhaps uniquely amongst prominent British composers, also composed and compiled suites of pieces for theatre orchestras to accompany silent films. He was also notably productive in writing original works for both brass band and military band.

Throughout his career he continually revised his compositions: titles were changed with an almost casual regularity (for instance, the opera Pierrot and Pierrette became The Stranger, the opera-ballet The Wizard became The Enchanter and the dramatic overture for brass band 1914 became Clive of India), many works were assigned several different opus numbers at different times, he borrowed music from one piece to another and recast works in different forms: for example, The Pit and the Pendulum draws its material from the opera-ballet The Enchanter, Symphony No.7 (Al Aaraaf) is a transcription for string orchestra of a String Sextet, The Masque of the Red Death which was originally another orchestral poem became a ballet, and what was illustrative of Henry Wadsworth Longfellow's The Skeleton in Armour was seemingly also a close depiction of Byron's The Corsair, whilst several different versions of his orchestral variations on Auld Lang Syne exist with a number of the supposed 'musical portraits' apparently applicable simultaneously to different contemporaries. Larger scores, particularly the operas in the Cauldron of Annwn trilogy, were also quarried to produce a variety of subsidiary works. Trios became quartets, quintets became sextets, chamber works and piano suites were augmented with additional movements only to be subsequently contracted by the removal of others, pieces for clarinet and piano were arranged for brass band and works which figure prominently in early promotional catalogues subsequently vanish from later ones:

"I cannot steady myself in the case of Holbrooke by copying a list of compositions because the list now would run from page to page, dates and serial opus numbers clashing, chronology all askew."

=== Style ===
Holbrooke was a late-Romantic composer, writing in a predominantly tonal, though richly chromatic, idiom. His style was essentially eclectic: whilst the early chamber works echo the language and methods of Brahms and Dvořák, there is also an exuberance informed by his affection for the music of Tchaikovsky:

"Perhaps Tchaikovsky has swayed him more than any other writer, although Mr. Holbrooke's music has nothing of the languorous grace of the Russian master's; it is rougher and more ragged at the edges, but it has much of Tchaikovsky's fire. In fact Mr. Holbrooke may be called an angular Tchaikovsky."

The orchestral scores display a virtuosity of instrumentation which owes much to Elgar and Richard Strauss, reaching a peak in works such as Queen Mab, The Bells, Apollo and the Seaman and The Children of Don. From his early maturity onwards, Holbrooke evinced a sophisticated appreciation of orchestral tone-colour, using several unusual instruments in his scores including the concertina (The Bells), sarrusophone (Apollo and the Seaman), saxhorn and saxophone (Serenade for oboe d'amore, clarinet, basset horn, two saxhorns, viola, five saxophones and harp). His reputation for using outlandish instruments and inflated orchestral resources is, however, generally undeserved: most of his large-scale works are scored for the modern symphony orchestra as used in the early twentieth century. Hannen Swaffer, a writer for The Graphic, referred humorously to Holbrooke on several occasions as "The Cockney Wagner", although the only real similarity between the two was a predilection for mythological music drama:

"The texture of Holbrooke's music is un-Wagnerian, and if kinship with another composer must be found, it should be with Richard Strauss; but Holbrooke's score [Bronwen] is not voluptuous like Wagner's, nor full of nervous frenzy like Strauss'. In the overture there is a figure very similar to a motif in the Magic Fire Music, but if you take the trouble to play or sing them one after the other, you perceive a difference. While Wagner's clothing of the theme is sensuous, Holbooke's is sombre, stark and barbaric."

Holbrooke generally utilised the freely-developing musical form as pioneered by Liszt, only loosely acknowledging more academic structures such as sonata form. This preference is shown in the frequent styling of his works as poems or fantasies, and the fact that virtually every single piece by him carries a descriptive or poetic title, often literary. Holbrooke's imagination was essentially illustrative:

"He has, indeed, a fine power of depicting strange scenes and situations to the mental vision by means of a masterly sense of tone colour. He paints with all that wealth of detail that distinguished the pre-Raphaelite school of painting, and endeavours to give every little nuance its place in the picture. His music is often full of luminous and magical suggestion, and his imaginative insight is very penetrating and sensitive."

Although Holbrooke's choral writing could occasionally be unadventurous and somewhat four-square, as in the poem for chorus and orchestra Byron, there are effects of startling originality elsewhere, ranging from the vocal use of the acciaccatura in The Bells to the multi-layered chorus of shouted warcries in the final act of Bronwen. The solo vocal writing in the mature operas, whilst not strictly comparable with verismo, is generally declamatory and follows naturalistic speech-rhythms: in this sense at least, along with many of his contemporaries, Holbrooke was indebted to Wagner although his musical idiom is more dissonant. Indeed, from the 1920s onwards his music gained a noticeably increased harmonic astringency:

"Since Bronwen he has entered on a new style, more modern, more dynamic, one in which his love of 'rubbing-notes' is given free rein. This style was foreshadowed in parts of Bronwen, though it is more suited probably to such things as his latest opera, the Snob, on a virile sketch of Cockney life, written by Charles McEvoy."

However, his occasional forays into atonalism in piano works such as Four Futurist Dances and Bogey Beasts were uncharacteristic and intended as caricature:

"Some years ago, I too perpetrated some startling horrors in music, entitled Four Futurist Dances, and very hideous they were. They were caused by a pianoforte recital. I was irritated, and personally had to do it, to get the taste of Mr Ornstein (Leo Ornstein) out of my mouth. He is an American pianist of great entertainment, but a poor composer. Yet those idiotic pieces of mine have been taken seriously by many a Bolshevik in music!"

Perhaps it was due to his early experience in the music hall that several of his melodies have a distinctly populist feel, for example the syncopated first subject in the final movement of the early Sextet in F minor.

=== Reputation ===
The tendency towards the pictorial rather than the abstract in his music undoubtedly stemmed from Holbrooke's tuition at the Royal Academy: his reputation, along with that of other composers (including Granville Bantock and Arnold Bax) who studied under Frederick Corder, an ardent Wagnerian, has consequently suffered from what has been perceived as a lack of rigorous musical thought and an assumed want of self-criticism:

"his ardour often in its haste disregards the subtler and finer issues, and it is usually in front of his power of invention: many pages of the bulky operas The Children of Don and Dylan surge along in massive style without saying anything distinctive, and he is very liable - the scena Marino Faliero is a typical example - to drop into mere sharp-cornered turgidity. No English composer has worked with more consistent ideals: but his music is often apt to strive and cry aloud unnecessarily, and much of its appeal has been consequently, in the long run, weakened."

"Indeed his only originality seems to have been in sonority rather than thematic or harmonic invention. The overture to Bronwen and the symphonic poem The Viking when played by the B.B.C. under Granville Bantock in 1943, when Holbrooke's music was totally unfamiliar to anyone of a later generation, revealed this personal and distinctive sound-texture but otherwise seemed shapeless and repetitive.".

"Corder's methods were progressive but too easygoing, and all his pupils, even the devastatingly gifted Bax, suffered from it. Stanford was perhaps the better teacher, but he was also cruelly repressive, reactionary and insensitive - all his pupils have put on record some story of his crushing dismissal of their work. [...] He did give his pupils a disciplined approach that stood them in good stead; but he overdid it. Bantock, Holbrooke and Bax suffered from lack of self-discipline. [...] In his orchestral works Holbrooke bumps along with many jerky changes of harmony and rhythm, and a general sense of distracted restlessness."

Other assessments of Holbrooke's music have been considerably more positive:

"It is a peculiarity of his music, with which I have often been struck, that no matter how extravagant and bizarre he may appear at times, never for one single moment do we feel that the effect is consciously laboured. It may not be precisely what we were expecting, but it invariably gives us the impression of being written forthright, of being the sincere record of something sincerely seen or unaffectedly felt. [...] I myself feel that Mr. Holbrooke's four symphonic poems [The Raven, The Skeleton in Armour, Ulalume and The Masque of the Red Death] will one day be recognised as something absolutely new in English or in any other music. They have an atmosphere, a psychology, that are his and his alone. They are not imitated; this atmosphere and this psychology are not in Wagner, or Tschaikowsky, or Richard Strauss. Morbidity - to employ a much abused word - has never been made so truly beautiful as here. [...] Mr. Holbrooke can do quite easily and unconsciously what Strauss has only done half a dozen times in his career - he can write a big, heartfelt melody that searches us to the very bone; and the musicians who have this gift as their birthright have a charmed life among a thousand shipwrecks."

"The popular impression of Holbrooke appears to be that he is a man of unregulated impulses, entirely self-centred, but by no means self-critical. This is quite an erroneous view of the man. Impulsive he undoubtedly is, and this characteristic often creeps into his work, but he rarely allows his musical ideas to appear in print until they have been approved by his calmer thought. [...] Most of his music passes through many crucibles of thought before it reaches its final form."

"The Cauldron of Anwyn [sic] if written by a foreigner would command more than respect. As it is, it remains a curiosity and in its original state completely unproducible with any possibility of economic security. [...] His symphonies and chamber music have all come in for their share of abuse. Holbrooke is belligerent and his music tells us so; but it is often magnificent. Few composers have written such vital sea music as appears in Dylan."

"Holbrooke’s idiom is characterized by its accessibility and melodic appeal. A number of works employ Welsh folk melody or show the influence of music he heard while travelling abroad. His compositions exhibit full recourse to chromatic harmony and some imaginative delays of dissonance resolution. In the symphonic poems his gift for pictorial representation is most readily apparent; music follows text almost in the manner of a film score. Consequently, these works tend to be episodic and occasionally disjunct. While formulaic tendencies appear in his string writing, his brass writing can be masterful and vibrant. His chosen literary sources, often intense or even macabre, inspired music that is equally fraught, eloquently capturing the dramatic suspense."

== Recordings ==
Only a small fraction of Holbrooke's large output has been recorded, although he was deeply interested in promoting his music through various reproductive formats. Scott-Ellis financed several gramophone recordings including excerpts from The Cauldron of Annwn, most notably from the final opera of the trilogy, Bronwen. Issued by Columbia, these were positively received:

"The Columbia Company have given one of our most neglected composers a hearing on the gramophone by their issue of some important fragments from Josef Holbrook'e music drama Bronwen. This country has had nothing so intensely individual and so closely dramatic in conception and treatment as the music of Bronwen. [...] Many unforgettable moments of grandeur and spiritual appeal will be wasted if music lovers omit to hear these records for themselves."

Other recordings appeared intermittently throughout the 1930s, including a coupling of the Dylan Prelude and the finale of Holbrooke's third symphony (both abridged) on Decca:

"It has been objected that Holbrooke is mighty clever, and precious little else. That seems too harsh a judgment. I think one can hear a fair amount of his music with pleasure, on occasion but the profound and the natively touching qualities he does not seem surely to command. Yet I have heard lots of preludes inferior in spirit and general stir to this Dylan one, which I think most people would enjoy. It is worth trying, in this clear, judicious, aptly coloured recording."

Another highlight was Paxton's 1949 recording of the piano concerto The Song of Gwyn ap Nudd played by Grace Lyndon with the London Promenade Orchestra conducted by Arthur Hammond (1904-1991).

In 1993 several of these historical recordings were re-issued on compact disc by Symposium. Besides gramophone records, Holbrooke oversaw the production of a large number of pianola and organ rolls of his music including abridged arrangements of Apollo and the Seaman, the overture to Children of Don, the overture to Bronwen, Queen Mab, The Viking, The Raven, The Wilfowl, the variations on Three Blind Mice and Auld Lang Syne, and the second piano concerto L'Orient. Few of his works were commercially recorded in the three decades following the composer's death in 1958, notable exceptions being The Birds of Rhiannon and The Song of Gwyn ap Nudd, although the BBC did broadcast a number of studio performances.

The advent of the compact disc has, however, brought a revival of interest: Marco Polo issued two orchestral discs and one chamber music disc, Hyperion included The Song of Gywn ap Nudd in its ongoing "Romantic Piano Concerto" series and Lyrita reissued their recording of The Birds of Rhiannon. More recently, several other companies have shown an interest in recording Holbrooke, including CPO, Dutton, Naxos and Cameo Classics.

== Legacy ==
His students included the conductor and composer Anthony Bernard.

The English composer and bassist Gavin Bryars paid tribute to Holbrooke by giving the name Joseph Holbrooke to his collective free-improvising trio with Derek Bailey and Tony Oxley. Despite the name, the group never played Holbrooke's compositions.

Holbrooke Court, Parkhurst Road, Islington built in 1974 is named after him.

== Archives ==
Holbrooke's letters to fellow musician Granville Bantock are held at the Cadbury Research Library (University of Birmingham). The collection also contains a small number of letters to Holbrooke from others.
