= The New World (Tony Oxley album) =

Studio album by Tony Oxley
- Released: 2023
- Recorded: 2022
- Studio: Viersen, Germany
- Genre: Free improvisation
- Label: Discus Music; 34190

Tony Oxley chronology
Unreleased 1974–2016 (2022)	The New World (2023)

The New World is an album by English musician Tony Oxley. His final release, it was recorded during 2022 in Viersen, Germany, and was issued on CD and as a digital download in 2023 by Discus Music. On the album, Oxley, who is heard on percussion and electronics, is joined by percussionist Stefan Hölker, who was previously heard on Oxley's Beaming (2020) and Unreleased 1974–2016 (2022).

== Reception ==
In a review for Jazz Journal, Michael Tucker called the album "a densely woven yet airy, self-defining abstract soundscape, rich in pointillist texture and abstracted, interlaced pulses but devoid of swing," and wrote: "A tough but engrossing listen, this, which may stand as a memorial to the drummer."

The New York City Jazz Record's Mike Shanley compared the music to "a visit to a Percussion Curiosity Shop," in which "low clattering sounds float in, only to disappear quickly." He commented: "The performance never rises to a frenetic level, and even when it flows rapidly, the mood always feels rather gentle... Neither Oxley or Hölker play in a busy manner. They are respectful of each other's space to such an extent that they practically become one sound, with Oxley's electronics acting as an additional voice."

Dominic Rivron of International Times stated: "Listening to the album, I was more than once reminded of the classical music avant-garde of the 1960s. That a sound-world created sixty years ago still sounds new today – and it does – says a lot... Although there are six tracks, you have a sense that, when one comes to an end and another starts, it's because you had to leave the room temporarily, not because the music ever stopped. You get the feeling Oxley and Hölker could've gone on for ever and never run out of things to say."

Writing for the Downtown Music Gallery, Bruce Lee Gallanter remarked: "I find the music here to be consistently fascinating and pretty diverse. Each piece seems to evoke a different vibe or inner landscape (for the mind)... The sounds here are often pulsating and sounds alive. The more I listen to this, the more I hear the way it is connected and how it unfolds. Is it composition or improvisation or both? Questions to consider as we listen."

In an article for Exposé Online, Peter Thelen wrote: "Oxley's masterful refinement of sounds and shadows amid swirling bursts of creative energy offer a unique perspective; these are not merely 'drum solos' or even enhanced solos, but compositions that deserve the most unique attention to every detail... With The New World, Oxley produced some engaging sound sculptures that are at once satisfying and magically haunting on a number of levels."

A reviewer for Freq stated that, on the album, "Oxley has taken the basic building blocks of percussion and diluted them down to their basest elements, and then magnified those, holding them up to the light and studying them in minute detail." He noted: "these six pieces rise from slow, scattered silence, their scuffling vibrations barely rising above room tone. They feel out the room, touching and gauging; a textural experience to which the electronics add mystery, ever present yet shaded from full view... This album is a soft and seductive delight that throws up new details on each listen and is well worth checking out."

== Track listing ==
Composed by Tony Oxley.

1. "Composition 1" – 7:51
2. "Composition 2" – 6:10
3. "Composition 3" – 7:03
4. "Composition 4" – 14:48
5. "Composition 5" – 5:13
6. "Composition 6" – 11:41

== Personnel ==
- Tony Oxley – percussion, electronics
- Stefan Hölker – acoustic percussion
