= Soho Suites =

Live album by Derek Bailey and Tony Oxley
- Released: 1997
- Recorded: February 1977; September 1995
- Venue: Soho, London; Knitting Factory, New York City
- Genre: Free improvisation
- Length: 1:45:05
- Label: Incus; CD 29/30

Derek Bailey chronology
The Sign of 4 (1997)	Soho Suites (1997)	No Waiting (1998)

Tony Oxley chronology
Deep (1997)	Soho Suites (1997)	Digger's Harvest (1999)

Soho Suites is a two-CD album by guitarist Derek Bailey and percussionist Tony Oxley. The music on disc one was recorded at a studio in Soho, London, during February 1977, while disc two documents a live session at the Knitting Factory in New York City on September 19, 1995. The album was released in 1997 by Incus Records.

== Reception ==
Professional ratings
Review scores
Source	Rating
AllMusic	4.5/5 stars
The Penguin Guide to Jazz	4/4 stars
The Virgin Encyclopedia of Jazz	3/5 stars

In a review for AllMusic, Thom Jurek wrote: "To play these CDs in sequence is quite remarkable. For those who have followed the careers of both men over the decades, it will be astonishing to hear what has been taken for granted in the development not only of their individual styles and approaches to improvisation, but in the actual evolution of those methods as they reach deeper into the musical muck for a kind of meaning that can only be generated in this type of musical pursuit... This is an awesome set, so strong it's better than 90 percent of what's out there passing for free improvisation. Just get it."

The authors of The Penguin Guide to Jazz Recordings awarded the album a full 4 stars, and stated: "these extraordinary sides roll back the years like nobody's business... these two discs seem to pass by in moments, when in fact they are among the most substantial performances from either man in recent years."

Seymour Wright of The Wire described the music as "an aggregate wealth of rational invention, sonic resources, traditions broached, instrumental control, and dry, tender, wry play." He commented: "Listen to the mix of acoustic and amplified sounds, and almost infinite attacks, combinations and decays of sounds across the Soho Suites... There's a zooming-in-and-out-of sonic proportion, tempers, physicalities, and unfolding of time at play that is remarkable and typical of Oxley and Bailey's work."

A reviewer for Hi-Fi News remarked: "Alternately sentimental and aggressive, this is very serious fun: musicians asking each other what the point is of it all, without relenting. Veteran players who risk more as they age? This bucks the clichés with vengeance. Shattering."

Author Ben Watson contrasted Bailey's "pointillist delicacy" on disc 1 with his "scything metal attack" on the second disc, and noted Oxley's "gorgeously reverberant and organic" sound. He wrote: "the way that time appears to stand still, opening up myriad extra pockets for fountains of variegated guitar and percussion sounds, has a similar quality on both discs, even though the two duos were recorded eighteen years apart."

== Track listing ==
Disc 1

1. "Carlisle" – 22:04
2. "Wardour" – 2:49
3. "Berwick" – 3:15
4. "Beak" – 17:01

Disc 2

1. "Rivington" – 17:40
2. "Kenmare" – 13:00
3. "Lafayette" – 3:40
4. "Grand" – 3:30
5. "Lispenard" – 15:40
6. "Leonard" – 3:10

== Personnel ==
- Derek Bailey – acoustic guitar, electric guitar
- Tony Oxley – percussion, violin
