= 4 Compositions for Sextet =

Studio album by Tony Oxley
- Released: 1970
- Recorded: 7 February 1970
- Genre: Avant-garde jazz, Free jazz
- Length: 38:14
- Label: Columbia

Tony Oxley chronology
The Baptised Traveller (1969)	4 Compositions for Sextet (1970)	Ichnos (1971)

4 Compositions for Sextet is an album by English free-jazz drummer Tony Oxley, which was recorded in 1970 and released on CBS. The album, the second of a trilogy that Oxley recorded for major labels, features the same band with whom he recorded the previous, The Baptised Traveller, expanded to a sextet with the addition of trombonist Paul Rutherford.

== Reception ==
Professional ratings
Review scores
Source	Rating
AllMusic	3/5 stars
The Penguin Guide to Jazz	3.5/4 stars
Tom Hull – on the Web	B+

In his review for AllMusic, Thom Jurek states "The four tunes are all outer-limits numbers; all methadrine takes on what were happening improvisations. It's true that there are loose structures imposed on all four tracks, but they quickly dissolve under the barrage of sonic whackery."

The Penguin Guide to Jazz notes that "Four Compositions was a title guaranteed to offend players and fans who wanted to set aside any implications of predetermined structures."

In his book Honesty Is Explosive!: Selected Music Journalism, music writer Ben Watson claims about the album "It is a stone-cold, drop-dead, ice pick-in-the-forehead masterpiece. It was too much for the marketing department at Columbia, and Oxley was dropped."

== Track listing ==
All compositions by Tony Oxley

1. "Saturnalia" – 10:09
2. "Scintilla" – 8:56
3. "Amass" – 13:00
4. "Megaera" – 6:09

== Personnel ==
- Evan Parker – tenor sax
- Kenny Wheeler – trumpet, flugelhorn
- Paul Rutherford – trombone
- Derek Bailey – guitar
- Jeff Clyne – bass
- Tony Oxley – drums
