= GratHovOx =

Live album by Frank Gratkowski, Fred Van Hove, and Tony Oxley
- Released: 2002
- Recorded: November 14, 2000
- Venue: Erholunghaus Bayer, Leverkusen, Germany
- Genre: Free improvisation
- Length: 1:03:22
- Label: Nuscope Recordings; CD 1012

Tony Oxley chronology
Floating Phantoms (2002)	GratHovOx (2002)	S.O.H. Live in London (2007)

GratHovOx is a live album by clarinetist and saxophonist Frank Gratkowski, pianist Fred Van Hove, and percussionist Tony Oxley. It was recorded on November 14, 2000, at Erholunghaus Bayer in Leverkusen, Germany, and was released in 2002 by Nuscope Recordings.

== Reception ==
Professional ratings
Review scores
Source	Rating
AllMusic	4.5/5 stars
The Penguin Guide to Jazz	3.5/4 stars

In a review for AllMusic, François Couture wrote: "GratHovOx embodies everything uninhibited free improv can deliver... The trio aims at a kind of free improvisation that leaves room to breathe and listen without getting entrenched in the sonic scrutiny of Berlin reductionism. The music has movement, grace, and moments of sheer excitement that never lose sight of the group sound -- the perfect balancing act... GratHovOx stands as one of the best free improv sessions released in 2002 and comes heartily recommended."

The authors of The Penguin Guide to Jazz Recordings described the album as one of Gratkowski's best recordings, and stated that Van Hove "seems to fire off instant compositions at quantum speed."

Glenn Astarita of All About Jazz called the album as "a most unusual yet largely gratifying set," with the musicians taking "a rather otherworldly and somewhat unclassifiable approach." He concluded: "With this release, the artists slam the lid on any preconceived expectations. (Recommended.)"

One Final Note's Scott Hreha described the recording as "some of the most egoless improvised music you're likely to hear," and commented: "all three players understand precisely how to use the space they've allowed themselves... Even when the musicians move into more aggressive territory... their restraint is astoundingly impeccable... they prove themselves more than capable of producing stellar improvisations—creating form from the slightest threads of connection without sacrificing the element of surprise."

Writing for Paris Transatlantic, Dan Warburton called the album "a jewel" and "one of the most exciting improv albums of the year," and remarked: "these pieces could conceivably be transcribed and performed as notated compositions and hold their own against contemporary repertoire. Not that they sound composed (they don't), but rather in that they intuitively partake of an idea of structure and motivic development quite in keeping with the aesthetic of European contemporary music."

== Track listing ==
1. "Tartar" – 4:46
2. "Carrousel" – 11:36
3. "Tiddledit" – 5:55
4. "Bâtons Rompus" – 6:16
5. "Foreplay/Vorspiel" – 5:17
6. "Witchy" – 3:22
7. "Trenches/Tranches" – 19:38
8. "Final Bounce" – 6:32

== Personnel ==
- Frank Gratkowski – alto saxophone, clarinet, bass clarinet, contrabass clarinet
- Fred Van Hove – piano, accordion
- Tony Oxley – drums, percussion
