= Birdland, Neuburg 2011 =

Live album by Cecil Taylor and Tony Oxley
- Released: 2020
- Recorded: November 18, 2011
- Venue: Birdland Jazz Club, Neuburg an der Donau, Germany
- Genre: Free Jazz
- Length: 58:00
- Label: Fundacja Słuchaj! FSR 13-2020

Birdland, Neuburg 2011 is a live album by pianist Cecil Taylor and drummer Tony Oxley. It was recorded at the Birdland Jazz Club in Neuburg an der Donau, Germany in November 2011, and was released in 2020 by Fundacja Słuchaj! Records.

The album was one of two that were produced from recordings that Tony Oxley found in his personal archives in 2020, the other Being Astral and All Registers – Power of Two.

== Reception ==
Professional ratings
Review scores
| Source | Rating |
|---|---|
| Tom Hull – on the Web | A− |
| The Free Jazz Collective | 5/5 stars |

Michael Rosenstein, in a review for Point of Departure, stated: "One can hear Taylor working through his 'unit structures,' spontaneously delving into his language of malleable clusters, fluid harmonic constructions, and vigorous sense of flow. Oxley locks right in as an active colleague, finding a gripping balance to Taylor's thrusts and parries, jointly moving toward unequivocal resolution... Taylor didn't perform or record much in his later years, so this document is welcome, particularly as it captures the two musicians at the top of their game."

In a review for Stereogum, Phil Freeman wrote: "This duo set... features both men at the top of their game. Oxley's particular contribution — what makes him unlike any other drummer, in free jazz or otherwise — is his crisp use of cymbals and small toms that sound like he's playing a collection of tuned plastic buckets. He cuts right through Taylor's tidal waves of piano, keeping pace with him at all times and offering compelling counter-narratives. The recording, courtesy of German radio, is impossibly clean and detailed; you can literally hear Taylor's piano bench creaking during many sections. This is an essential document for any Taylor fan."

Derek Taylor, writing for Dusted Magazine, commented: "A Cecil Taylor concert isn't context conducive to conversation or inattention. Allowing one's mind to wander isn't a luxury to indulge in lest the sequential intricacies of the ensuing architectures become obfuscated. Even within the accepted degree of unspoken decorum, the German assemblage distinguishes itself in its collective engagement. Taylor and Oxley reciprocate with an unbroken, animated dialogue riddled with elaborations and instigations. The minutes evaporate, eventually adding up to an approximate hour that feels much shorter in mental sum. A musical alliance forged three decades earlier on a different German stage remains indisputably intact."

In a review for The Whole Note, Ken Waxman remarked: "Taylor was 82 at this gig, yet displayed no loss of interpretative power. Paradoxically in fact, his playing is more adventurous and masterful than on his first LP in 1956. Like a late-career interpretation by Rubinstein or Horowitz, this CD is both defining and definitive."

A review at the Marlbank web site stated: "It's a reminder once again how remarkable Taylor's sound was, how in alliance with drummer Tony Oxley in a setting that emphasises the power he exerted at the piano and once again how uncompromising his approach was. Full of an intrepid sense of adventure and a sense of freedom where he can do anything he wants to Taylor teases out the tiniest phrase to expand his improvisations into an infinity and the album has a unity to it, Oxley's free flowing multi-directional style swirling and rising behind him in a thrilling combination."

Stephen Griffith of The Free Jazz Collective called the album "one of the lofty high points" of Taylor's career, and wrote: "Something which sets this apart from Taylor's other European recordings during his later years is that it took place in a club seating 112 people... The intimacy of the setting allowed both to play more subdued passages without concern for filling a cavernous sound space... The recording captures the acoustic nuances of both artists."

== Track listing ==
1. "Birdland, Neuburg Part 1" – 41:58
2. "Birdland, Neuburg Part 2" – 16:02

== Personnel ==
- Cecil Taylor – piano
- Tony Oxley – drums
