= Conversations with Tony Oxley =

Live album by Cecil Taylor and Tony Oxley
- Released: 2018
- Recorded: February 20, 2008
- Venue: Kammermusiksaal der Philharmonie Berlin
- Genre: Free Jazz
- Label: Jazzwerkstatt jw198

Conversations with Tony Oxley is a live album by pianist Cecil Taylor and drummer Tony Oxley. It was recorded at the Chamber Music Hall of the Berliner Philharmonie in Berlin, Germany in February 2008, and was released in 2018 by Jazzwerkstatt.

== Reception ==
Professional ratings
Review scores
Source	Rating
Tom Hull – on the Web	A−
The Free Jazz Collective	4.5/5 stars

In a review for Jazz Views, Jack Kenny wrote: "The improvisation on this album is total from both players. This is listening music... the intensity varies, stretching both men as cymbal splashes complement notes from the higher reaches of the keyboard. Sometimes the music stops and all we can hear is silence before the momentum gathers again. This is exciting music that demands complete attention, your absorption, and is rewarding in a way that is quite rare."

Writing for The New York City Jazz Record, Duck Baker commented: "When the two musicians are in sync the music seems to flow through them both from a source beyond either. Clearly Taylor generally leads and the drummer follows, but so quick are Oxley's instincts that his responses often lead perfectly in the direction the pianist was aiming to take, so that they seem to move in unison... those who love Taylor will definitely want Conversations."

Martin Schray of The Free Jazz Collective stated that the music is "about the exchange of cultural experiences and the sensitivity of sound – different musical languages, but mutually inspiring. Oxley often anticipates what Taylor plans (particularly as to dynamics) and is able to react immediately."

== Track listing ==
1. "Berlin Conversations 1" – 37:18
2. "Berlin Conversations 2" – 18:53
3. "Berlin Conversations 3" – 17:04
4. "Berlin Conversations 4" – 4:50

== Personnel ==
- Cecil Taylor – piano
- Tony Oxley – drums
