= Ivar Grydeland =

Norwegian jazz guitarist and composer

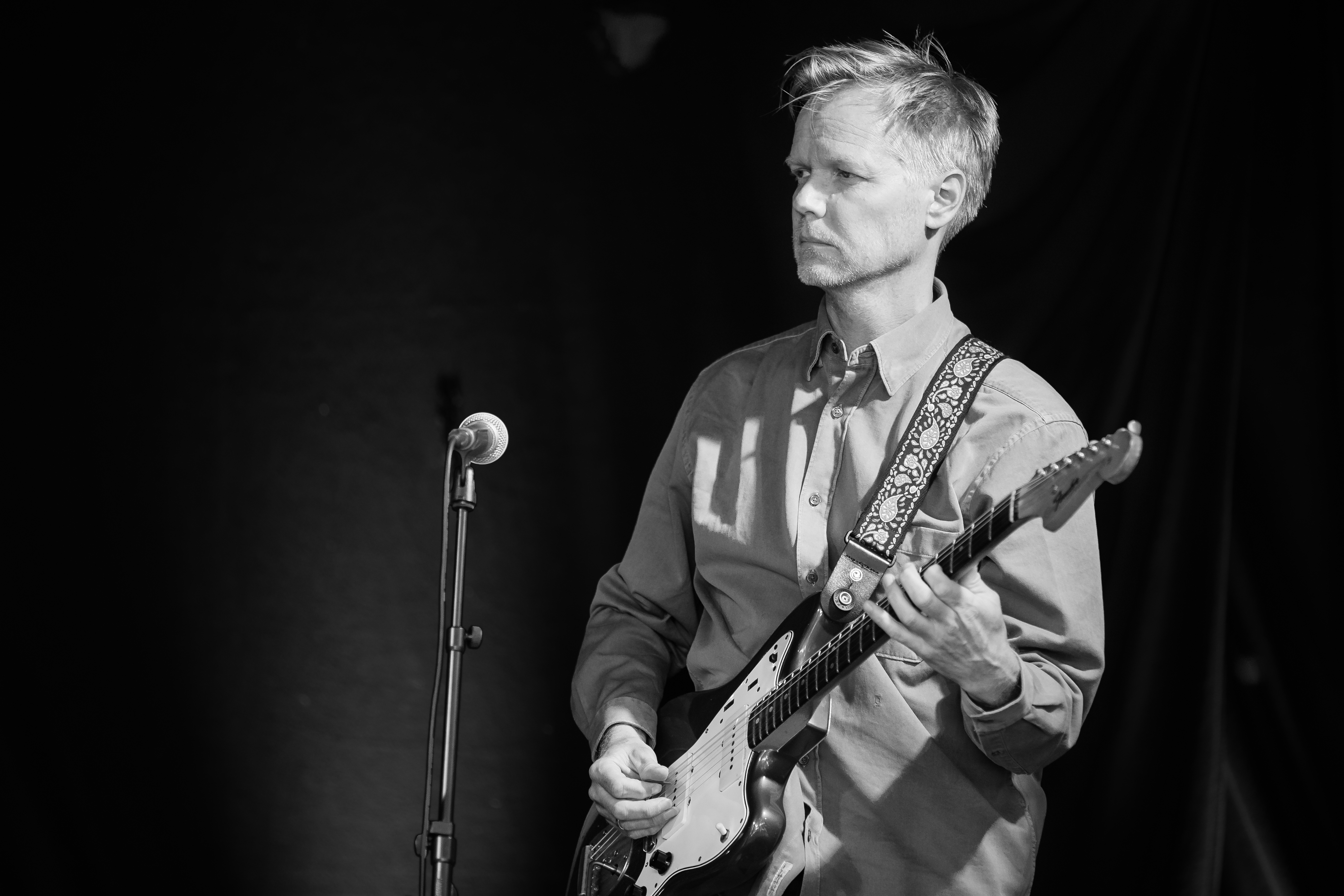
- Ivar Grydeland performing in 2023; Photo: Tore Sætre

Background information
- Born: 1 October 1976 (age 49); Trondheim, Sør-Trøndelag
- Origin: Norway
- Genres: Jazz
- Occupations: Musician, composer
- Instruments: Guitar, banjo, pedal steel guitar
- Website: www.ivargrydeland.com

Ivar Grydeland (born 1 October 1976) is a Norwegian jazz musician (guitar) and composer raised in Kongsberg.

== Career ==
Grydeland was born in Trondheim, Norway, and studied jazz guitar at the Norwegian Academy of Music (1996–2000, and 2001–2003). He started his jazz career in the Big Band 'Ung Musikk' in 1995. He collaborates within the band Huntsville (six albums) together with Tonny Kluften and Ingar Zach, within 'Dans les arbres' (two albums) together with Christian Wallumrød, Xavier Charles and Ingar Zach, and plays with Hanne Hukkelberg. Grydeland plays acoustic guitar, electric guitar and banjo with a mixture of finger picking technique, various types of bows, metal, propellers and electronic devices, he teaches at Norwegian Academy of Music in Oslo, and runs the record label Sofa.

In 2000 Grydeland participated together with Tonny Kluften on a project with Tony Oxley resulting in the album Triangular Screen. On the first album in his own name These Six (2003), he collaborated in a trio with Tonny Kluften and Paul Lovens. With Philipp Wachsmann, Charlotte Hug and Ingar Zach he released the album Wazahugy (2002), and with Jaap Blonk and Ingar Zach Improvisors (2004). In 2006 the release Szc Zcz Cze Zec Eci Cin within the trio Ivar Grydeland/Thomas Lehn/Ingar Zach followed, and Improvisors together with Jaap Blonk and Ingar Zach in 2004. Grydeland collaborated with Leonel Kaplan on the album Portraits 2004 (2011), and he released the critically acclaimed solo album Bathymetric Modes in 2012.

== Discography ==
=== Solo albums ===
Solo project

- 2012: Bathymetric Modes (Hubro Records)

Trio including with Tonny Kluften & Paul Lovens

- 2003: These Six (Sofa Records)

As Ivar Grydeland/Thomas Lehn/Ingar Zach trio

- 2006: Szc Zcz Cze Zec Eci Cin (Musica Genera)

=== Collaborations ===
Duo with Ingar Zach

- 2000: Visiting Ants (Sofa Records)
- 2004: You Should Have Seen Me Before We First Met (Sofa Records)
- 2011: Lady Lord (Sofa Records), live as Emo Albino at Kongsberg Jazzfestival

With Tony Oxley Project 1

- 2000: Triangular Screen (Sofa Records), trio including with Tonny Kluften

Within No Spaghetti Edition

- 2001: Listen... And Tell Me What It Was (Sofa Records)
- 2002: Pasta Variations (Sofa Records)
- 2003: Real Time Satellite Data (Sofa Records)
- 2006: Sketches of a Fusion (Sofa Records), feat. Christian Wallumrød

With Philipp Wachsmann, Charlotte Hug & Ingar Zach

- 2002: Wazahugy (Sofa Records)

Within HISS including with Tonny Kluften, Pat Thomas & Ingar Zach

- 2003: Zahir (Rossbin Records)

With Jaap Blonk & Ingar Zach

- 2004: Improvisors (Kontrans Records)

Within Arm

- 2004: Open Reminder (Melektronikk Records)

Duo with Yumiko Tanaka

- 2005: Continental Crust (Sofa Records)

Within Huntsville trio including with Tonny Kluften & Ingar Zach

- 2006: For The Middle Class (Rune Grammofon)
- 2008: Eco, Arches & Eras (Rune Grammofon)
- 2011: For Flowers, Cars And Merry Wars (Hubro Records)
- 2011: Splashgirl/Huntsville (Hubro Records), together with Splashgirl
- 2013: Past Increasing, Future Receding (Hubro Records)

As Marc Pichelin/Xavier Charles/Ivar Grydeland

- 2008: North of the North (Sofa Records)

Within Dans Les Arbres including with Xavier Charles, Christian Wallumrød & Ingar Zach

- 2008: Dans Les Arbres (ECM Records)
- 2012: Canopée (ECM Records)

Within Ballrogg trio including with Klaus Ellerhusen Holm & Roger Arntzen

- 2008: Ballrogg (Bolage Records)
- 2010: Insomnia (Bolage Records)
- 2012: Cabin Music (Hubro Records)

With Leonel Kaplan

- 2011: Portraits 2004 (Audition Records), with Diego Chamy & Axel Dörner

Within Last Heat

- 2012: Last Heat (Jansen Plateproduksjon)

Finland including with Morten Qvenild, Jo Berger Myhre, Pål Hausken

- 2015: Rainy Omen (Hubro Music)
