= Elaboration of Particulars =

Studio album by Tony Oxley and Alan Davie
- Released: 2021
- Recorded: 1977 and 1978
- Studio: Gamels Studio, Rush Green, Hertford, United Kingdom
- Genre: Free improvisation
- Label: Confront Recordings core 20
- Producer: Mark Wastell

Tony Oxley chronology
Beaming (2020)	Elaboration of Particulars (2021)	Unreleased 1974–2016 (2022)

Elaboration of Particulars is an album by percussionist Tony Oxley and multi-instrumentalist Alan Davie. It was recorded during 1977 and 1978 at Gamels Studio in Rush Green, Hertford, United Kingdom, and was released by Confront Recordings in 2021.

== Reception ==
Professional ratings
Review scores
Source	Rating
Jazzwise	3/5 stars
Marlbank	4/5 stars

In a review for Jazzwise, Kevin Whitlock wrote: "the empathy between the pair is palpable, and unusually for this kind of improv, they sound as if they're having a whale of a time... this music is about texture and space rather than tunes and narrative, but it's surprisingly accessible, and a compelling, valuable record of an intriguing collaboration between two like-minded explorers of the musical margins."

JazzWord's Ken Waxman stated: "the CD's eight tracks evoke a preoccupation with tone and timbre extensions rather than concentrating on raw intensity. Partially because of the electronics, sound convergence squealing metallic crunches and pulsating wooden echoes as well as more expected percussion slaps and keyboard clips and shaking single notes are projected." He concluded that the musicians explore "the texture of piano and percussion to its greatest and most original advantage."

Marc Medwin of The New York City Jazz Record commented: "Each cymbal and drum stroke, piano sonority and attendant electronic exhortation thrums with the excitement of discovery and rings with the satisfaction of event in fruition. Music such as this exists within and transcends its time, each audition a multivalent glance at the creative histories and microhistories caught, enshrined and discarded by those brave souls who created them."

Writing for the Downtown Music Gallery, Bruce Lee Gallanter remarked: "This disc/session is superbly recorded and well-balanced. The blend of percussion, piano and electronics is unique and every sound makes sense. The music is much closer to electronic chamber music than jazz... Thanks to our friends at Confront for getting this buried treasure into our present sound-world."

Writer Adam Baruch stated: "This music is not only freely improvised, but it also employs unconventional sounds, which cannot be defined or even annotated in the conventional notation systems. And yet this music certainly boasts other aspects of music, like telepathic communication between the performers, high emotions and coherent aesthetics, creativity and inventiveness... for music lovers able to appreciate music beyond the obvious, music that demands open-mindedness and open heart, music that challenges and inspires cerebral activity, this is something they would not want to miss."

Frans de Waard of Vital Weekly wrote: "There is a beautiful vibrancy to the material, an excellent interplay between drums and piano, but with so much more happening between the cracks of the music... it is music that remains melodic at all times... This could have been a great LP in the seventies, and it made me wonder: why did it take so long to release this beauty?"

A writer for the Marlbank web site called the album "extraordinary," and noted: "A very absorbing, unearthly listen, it's hugely compelling, challenging and above all full of vitality."

== Track listing ==
1. "Particular I" – 3:03
2. "Particular II" – 6:07
3. "Particular III" – 6:18
4. "Particular IV" – 3:00
5. "Particular V" – 5:50
6. "Particular VI" – 5:47
7. "Particular VII" – 4:40
8. "Particular VIII" – 9:46

== Personnel ==
- Tony Oxley – percussion, electronics
- Alan Davie – piano, percussion, ring modulator
