= Joseph Holbrooke (band) =

UK musical trio

Joseph Holbrooke were a musical trio in the United Kingdom (particularly in and around Sheffield) in the 1960s and briefly re-formed in 1998. The group consisted of Derek Bailey (guitar), Gavin Bryars (double bass) and Tony Oxley (drums). The group was named in honour of the English composer Joseph Charles Holbrooke.

== Discography ==
- "'65 (Rehearsal Extract)" (single; Incus, 1999)
- '98 (Incus, 2000)
- The Moat Recordings (Tzadik, 2006) – recorded in 1998
