= A Birthday Tribute: 75 years =

Live album by Tony Oxley
- Released: 2013
- Recorded: 1977 and 1993
- Genre: Free improvisation
- Labels: Incus; CD63

Tony Oxley chronology
Improvised Pieces for Trio (2010)	A Birthday Tribute: 75 years (2013)	Beaming (2020)

A Birthday Tribute: 75 years is a live album by percussionist Tony Oxley released in celebration of his seventy-fifth birthday. The album begins with two quartet tracks recorded during 1993, on which Oxley is joined by guitarist Derek Bailey, keyboardist Pat Thomas, and electronic musician Matt Wand. The remaining three tracks were recorded during 1977, and feature Oxley in a duo with trombonist Paul Rutherford, a trio with violinist Philipp Wachsmann and guitarist Ian Brighton, and a solo percussion work with electronics. The album was released in 2013 by Incus Records.

== Reception ==
Professional ratings
Review scores
Source	Rating
All About Jazz	4.5/5 stars
The Free Jazz Collective	3.5/5 stars
The List	5/5 stars

In a review for All About Jazz, John Eyles wrote: "the album is a gift not to Oxley himself but to fans of the music which he and Incus championed and epitomised—classic improv. It showcases Oxley in a variety of situations and is eloquent testimony to his talents as a musician."

The Free Jazz Collective's Colin Green stated: "this is challenging music that does not deliver up its secrets easily, and requires patient and attentive listening, which many... are understandably, not prepared to undertake... Oxley has always been concerned with articulating different kinds of musical space, and there is a possibly useful analogy with certain modern sculptors for whom movement in space and the changing relations between objects is a defining aspect of what they're about."

Stewart Smith of The List called the album "a mind-blowing trip to the outer limits" that "shows British free improvisation at its spiky, boundary-exploding best." He described the 1993 tracks as "riveting," and stated that the 1977 duet with Rutherford "sounds like an extraterrestrial transmission, with the electronically treated horn emitting all manner of strange alien tongues, while Oxley's amplified kit sends out UFO blips and metallic space junk clangs."

Writing for JazzWord, Ken Waxman called the album "a superior if somewhat inconsistent homage," and commented: "As a salute to Oxley's skills, A Birthday Tribute: 75 years will be welcomed by those who have long followed the percussionist's career and those hungering for distinctive British Free Music. But regrettably it won't be able to define for the newbie what has made the drummer's playing pace-setting over many years."

Kurt Gottschalk of The Wire included the album in his 2013 Rewind, listing the year's best albums.

== Track listing ==
1. "Colour Fields" – 29:09
2. "Urban Forms" – 4:21
3. "Kelson" – 7:19
4. "The Earth Sounds" – 14:15
5. "Times" – 5:54

== Personnel ==
- Tony Oxley – drums, percussion, electronics
- Derek Bailey – guitar (tracks 1 and 2)
- Pat Thomas – keyboards (tracks 1 and 2)
- Matt Wand – sampler (tracks 1 and 2)
- Paul Rutherford – trombone, electronics (track 3)
- Phillip Wachsmann – violin (track 4)
- Ian Brighton – guitar (track 4)
