= Floating Phantoms =

Live album by Tony Oxley / The B.I.M.P. Quartet
- Released: 2002
- Recorded: November 5, 1999
- Venue: "Total Music Meeting," Berlin
- Genre: Free improvisation
- Length: 1:04:10
- Label: a/l/l 001
- Producer: Tony Oxley

Tony Oxley chronology
Triangular Screen (2000)	Floating Phantoms (2002)	GratHovOx (2002)

Floating Phantoms is a live album by the B.I.M.P. Quartet, led by percussionist Tony Oxley, and featuring violinist Phil Wachsmann, keyboardist Pat Thomas, and electronic musician Matt Wand. It was recorded on November 5, 1999, at the "Total Music Meeting" in Berlin, and was issued in 2002 by the German label a/l/l, an imprint of FMP, as their inaugural release.

== Reception ==
Professional ratings
Review scores
Source	Rating
AllMusic	3/5 stars
The Penguin Guide to Jazz	2.5/4 stars

JazzWord's Ken Waxman called the album "A first-rate example of a new strain of contemporary BritImprov," and wrote: "the four represent two generations of British improvisers who wholeheartedly embrace the different textures available from arching kilowatts, and have long been bending machines to do their bidding," with the music appearing to document "what would have happened if Sun Ra, synth and electric piano in either hand, had climbed into Mr. Peabody's Wayback Machine."

In a review for AllMusic, François Couture stated: "in general the group displays enough synergy and textural interplay to make Floating Phantoms a worthy record, but it fails to establish Wand as a strong improviser. Still recommended, if only for the crystal-clear recording of the percussionist's every bang and clang."

Declan O'Driscoll of The Journal of Music commented: "Samples rush by like subliminal messages or urgent signals from a distressed witness. Thankfully they lack recognisable sources (no po-mo cleverness). They are used because they help to make fascinating music, the endless curiosity of uncertainty. They make music with positive momentum, a glorious din and... occasional silence."

The authors of The Penguin Guide to Jazz Recordings described the album as "something of a disappointment" and "remarkably callow" given "how comfortably Wachsmann has absorbed electronic processing into his work and how long Oxley has used electronics with his drum kit."

== Track listing ==
All music composed by Matt Wand, Pat Thomas, Philipp Wachsmann, and Tony Oxley.

1. "Line In" – 14:44
2. "Line Out" – 9:06
3. "On Line" – 4:14
4. "Stream Line" – 24:40
5. "Beam Line" – 11:25

== Personnel ==
- Tony Oxley – percussion
- Phil Wachsmann – violin, electronics
- Pat Thomas – piano, keyboards, electronics
- Matt Wand – sampler
