= February Papers =

Studio album by Tony Oxley
- Released: 1977
- Recorded: February 1977
- Studio: Hampden Gurney Studios, London
- Genre: Free jazz
- Label: Incus Records; 18; Discus Music; 99CD

Tony Oxley chronology
The Tony Oxley/Alan Davie Duo (1975)	February Papers (1977)	S.O.H. (1979)

CD reissue cover

February Papers is an album by percussionist Tony Oxley. It was recorded during February 1977 at Hampden Gurney Studios in London, and was released on LP later that year by Incus Records. On the album, Oxley is joined by guitarist Ian Brighton, violinists David Bourne and Philipp Wachsmann, and bassist Barry Guy. In 2020, the album was reissued on CD by Discus Music.

== Reception ==
Professional ratings
Review scores
Source	Rating
AllMusic	3/5 stars
The Encyclopedia of Popular Music	3/5 stars

In a review for Point of Departure, David Grundy wrote: "February Papers is an intensely focused album... Broadly speaking, 'composition' here suggests arrangements of ensemble texture in quartet, trio and solo configurations, or, in the case of Oxley's solo percussion, focusing on particular surfaces or striking implements. The music is collective, non-egotistical: a rustling world of detail and blur, highly active yet somehow evasive, sounds insinuating themselves on the edge of consciousness."

Ken Waxman of JazzWord praised Oxley's solo tracks, stating that they "confirm the percussion smarts that allowed him to gig with Hard Boppers and Free Jazzers alike. Plus these stentorian bass drum rumbles, cymbal shrills and electronic drones are not only persuasive on their own, but as accompaniment transform showpieces into contrapuntal connections."

Musician and writer Henry Kuntz called the album "essential listening" thanks to its "advanced technical and conceptual ideas," and described the track titled "Combination" as "one of [Oxley's] most fully realized integrations of electronic and acoustic sound sources on record." He stated that the ensemble work "tend[s] to blur rather than to accentuate instrumental difference," but noted that "there are obvious compositional and developmental principles at work and well structured-in solos."

Writing for Contact, Keith Potter stated that "The music on this disc is nicely paced and varied from track to track," and, regarding the solo pieces, remarked: "Composition or improvisation? In a way it doesn't really matter here. The composer has the freedom to play what he wants. And the improviser to compose (pre-structure?) as much as he wants."

== Track listing ==
Composed by Tony Oxley.

1. "Quartet 1" – 7:26
2. "Sounds of the Soil 2" – 7:15
3. "Brushes" – 4:06
4. "Chant-Quartet 2" – 6:43
5. "Trio 2" – 5:10
6. "Combination" – 6:58
7. "On the Edge (To E.P.)" – 2:57

== Personnel ==
- Tony Oxley – percussion, electronics, violin
- Ian Brighton – electric guitar
- David Bourne – violin
- Philipp Wachsmann – violin
- Barry Guy – bass guitar, double bass
