= Unreleased 1974–2016 =

Studio album by Tony Oxley
- Released: 2022
- Recorded: 1974, 1981, and 2016
- Genre: Free improvisation
- Label: Discus Music; 129CD

Tony Oxley chronology
Elaboration of Particulars (2021)	Unreleased 1974–2016 (2022)	The New World (2023)

Unreleased 1974–2016 is an album by drummer and electronic musician Tony Oxley. The first three tracks were recorded in 1974, and feature Oxley with trumpeter Dave Holdsworth, trombonist Paul Rutherford, pianist Howard Riley, and bassist Barry Guy. These tracks were remastered and edited into their final form in 2005, 2019, and 2020. Track four, recorded in 1981, is performed by Oxley, saxophonist Larry Stabbins, violinist Phil Wachsmann, pianist Howard Riley, and guitarist Hugh Metcalfe, while the fifth and final track, recorded in 2016, pairs Oxley with percussionist Stefan Hölker. Drawn from Oxley's personal archive of recordings, the album was released in 2022 by Discus Music.

== Reception ==
Professional ratings
Review scores
Source	Rating
Jazzwise	3/5 stars
Marlbank	4/5 stars
Tom Hull – on the Web	B+

In a review for Jazz Journal, Peter Gamble wrote: "The kind of presentations we are faced with here are typical of so much of his output from the 1970s onwards, abandoning accepted form and structure, asking questions of the listener and taking no prisoners in the process... The emphasis is not on the leader's skills as a drummer; rather the music illustrates how important the collective effort has been in so much of his creative work."

The Whole Note's Ken Waxman stated: "These previously unreleased tracks... contain sounds that not only expand improvised music history, but also reveal early adaptations of today's electroacoustic interactions... Remastered with full-spectrum, 21st-century sound, these heirlooms of an earlier era easily justify their unearthing and prominent display."

The editors of The New York City Jazz Record declared the album an "Unearthed Gem," and reviewer George Grella commented: "This is music that is very much in the moment, with no long-term and little short-term memory, free music not trying to build a larger form or any kind of dramatic direction, instead forgetting about anything that had come before and remaking itself every instant. That makes it sound far less like anything in the broad category of free jazz than high-modernist classical music... It is a powerfully satisfying thing to hear improvised music that sounds like it connects to such a larger and older context."

Writing for the Downtown Music Gallery, Bruce Lee Gallanter noted that Oxley "has remained at the cutting edge of avant jazz drumming, experimental percussion & electronics," and remarked: "It is Tony Oxley's sound which is at the center of each of these pieces, all of which are captivating to the serious listeners amongst us."

A reviewer for Vital Weekly wrote: "The album is a good example of how Oxley integrated electronics in free, acoustic improvisation, creating a world that often comes close to the atmospheres of modern composed music... the combination of drums, percussion and electronics was a lifelong fascination for Oxley and makes me eager to know what more diamonds are kept in the archives."

Daniel Spicer of Jazzwise stated: "These previously unheard snippets from [Oxley's] own archive underscore his passionate, unswerving commitment to non-idiomatic sound creation... It's a pretty convincing survey of a life devoted to serious investigation."

== Track listing ==
1. "The Embrace" – 9:20
2. "Ensemble 1" – 7:30
3. "Ensemble 2" – 4:28
4. "Frame" – 14:53
5. "Combination" – 11:52

== Personnel ==
- Tony Oxley – drums, percussion, violin, electronics, sounds
- Dave Holdsworth – trumpet, sounds (tracks 1–3)
- Paul Rutherford – trombone (tracks 1–3)
- Howard Riley – piano (tracks 1–4)
- Barry Guy – double bass, bass guitar (tracks 1–3)
- Larry Stabbins – saxophones (track 4)
- Phil Wachsmann – violin, electronics (track 4)
- Hugh Metcalfe – guitar, cymbal (track 4)
- Stefan Hölker – acoustic percussion (track 5)
