= Being Astral and All Registers – Power of Two =

Live album by Cecil Taylor and Tony Oxley
- Released: 2020
- Recorded: May 10, 2002
- Venue: Ulrichsberg Festival, Ulrichsberg, Austria
- Genre: Free Jazz
- Length: 59:40
- Label: Discus; 106CD

Being Astral and All Registers – Power of Two is a live album by pianist Cecil Taylor and drummer Tony Oxley. It was recorded at the Ulrichsberg Festival in Ulrichsberg, Austria in May 2002, and was released in 2020 by Discus Records.

The album was one of two that were produced from recordings that Tony Oxley found in his personal archives in 2020, the other being Birdland, Neuburg 2011. In the album liner notes, Oxley recalled meeting Taylor for the first time in 1988, and stated that, after their initial musical encounter, Taylor told the concert organizer "He is The One!"

The phrase "Being Astral and All Registers" is from the last line of a Taylor poem titled "Choir."

== Reception ==
Professional ratings
Review scores
Source	Rating
Jazzwise	3/5 stars
Jazz Journal	4/5 stars
All About Jazz	3.5/5 stars
Tom Hull – on the Web	B+

In a review for Jazzwise, Daniel Spicer wrote: "while the idea of telepathic communion has become a commonplace when describing the process of making improvised music, with Taylor and Oxley there's a real sense of something uncanny in the sudden stops and blossoming moments of beauty. They were, without doubt, masters at work."

Writing for Jazz Journal, Nic Jones commented: "If a lot of 'contemporary jazz' is a sound of indifference, then this release is a sound of commitment. Generalisations sweeping or otherwise are often risky, and that's true here, but the fact remains that Taylor and Oxley broach no compromise. Theirs is a sound world that makes demands of the listener, and furthermore makes demands of themselves... such pioneers as this pair keep a foot in the world as it is, while hinting emphatically at worlds yet to be mapped."

David Grundy, in a review for Point of Departure, stated: "The contrast between Oxley's intensely reactive style, at once clattery and melodic, and Taylor's thickly flowering streams of notes mined a whole new stream... With Taylor, Oxley became increasingly responsive and melodic, often repeating the pianist's melodic gestures a split second after they were played, anticipating and underscoring, contrasting and amplifying the fast-moving details of Taylor's playing, his figuration and refiguration of melodic material across the octaves ('all registers'). Throughout, the two practiced what Adam Baruch in the liner notes... calls an 'exchange of roles, i.e. drumming on the piano and playing on the drums'... Rising from abyss to astral, at once basic – fundamental – and rivetingly dense with information, this music is luminous clarity and grace. Highly recommended."

A writer for Avant Music News noted: "Taylor was in his early 70s when these performances were recorded, and Oxley was only about a decade younger. But they play with the energy and drive of musicians half their age. Indeed, this workout would give anyone a challenge, including the listener."

Karl Ackermann, in a review for All About Jazz, remarked: "much of the half-hour free improvisations... is resolutely free-wheeling, but both pieces... have melodies strewn through the anarchy. It is no less challenging a listen than much of Taylor's catalog, but it does occasionally come up for air... Oxley's late-career discoveries only enhance the reputations of these two legends."

A review at the Marlbank web site stated: "Full on and intense but that is only one part of the effect... because Taylor smashes through to another space entirely, his extensive use of abstraction populating a saturated canvas alert and ready to transform in a maximalist way depending on the way he directs the light to shine on each note and passage. That light means revelation upon revelation."

Writing for The New York City Jazz Record, George Grella called the album "essential," and commented: "As usual with the two, they start playing but the music feels like it had been going on all along between them, before they sat at their instruments. As much as Taylor could stab down on a moment in time, there is a constant linear flow to the music, a flexible suppleness that integrates every event with all those that have come before."

Simon Sweetman of Off the Tracks wrote: "at one point it is almost a case of peering deep into a blur to decipher if the noise is from the drum kit or the piano key; of course the answer is that it’s from the painted combination... if you want to dip a tentative toe in then this is the very water to broach. It's wonderful to have Oxley opening the archives so we can access this. How joyous to hear Taylor and Oxley opening wide their very souls."

A reviewer for Freq wrote that "the overriding sensation that comes from" the album is "joy; at times an utterly maniacal joy but joy nevertheless." He remarked: "The relentless invention shown by Taylor and Oxley here is second to none, and the best thing to do is just sit back and allow the uproar to engulf you and be swept away."

== Track listing ==
1. "Being Astral and All Registers" – 33:00
2. "Power of Two" – 26:40

== Personnel ==
- Cecil Taylor – piano
- Tony Oxley – drums
