= Leonel Kaplan =

Argentine trumpet player (born 1973)

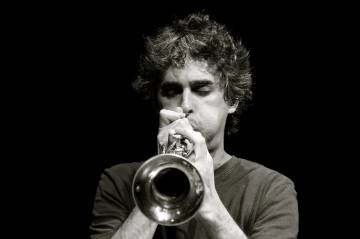
- Kaplan at High Zero Festival, 2006

Background information
- Born: November 21, 1973 (age 52); Buenos Aires, Argentina
- Genres: Experimental, free improvisation, electroacoustic
- Occupation: Musician
- Instrument: Trumpet
- Labels: ESP-Disk, Another Timbre, Relative Pitch, L'innomable, Dromos, Creative Sources

Leonel Kaplan (born November 21, 1973) is an Argentine trumpet player active in free improvisation. He has been part of the international improvised music scene since the early 2000s, performing and recording throughout Latin America, Europe, and the U.S.

== History ==
Kaplan worked with percussionist Diego Chamy and trumpeter Axel Dörner first. The trio album debut Absence (Creative Sources) was recorded in Buenos Aires in 2003 and was followed by European presentations, including festivals such as Musique et Quotidian Sonore and the NPAI Festival. Kaplan's collaborations around that time involved him on tours with Le Quan Ninh, Michel Doneda, Wade Matthews, Bhob Rainey & Greg Kelley (Nmpering), and Ivar Grydeland (Huntsville).

In 2005 after daily rehearsal and exploration for 20 days in upstate New York, Kaplan formed Silo Trio with trumpeter Nate Wooley and cellist Audrey Chen. The trio released Silo (Utech Records) the same year and toured Belgium, France, Germany, Netherlands, and England in the winter of 2006, and during late September they traveled through the Midwest, South, and East Coast of the U.S.

Kaplan also played extensively with Japanese drummer Tatsuya Nakatani. In 2007 they were invited to perform at the Festival of New Trumpet in New York City by trumpeter Dave Douglas. Other collaborations included tours and recordings with French clarinetist Xavier Charles, the large improvisation group No Spaghetti Edition Ensamble, dancers Nicole Bindler, Andrea Fernández and Ly Thanh Tiên, and a trumpet piece commissioned by Jennifer Allora & Guillermo Calzadilla for a work entitled "Wake Up" written for the Renaissance Society in Chicago.

Since 2007 he has been working in a duo with Christof Kurzmann (sometimes amplified by Edén Carrasco, John Butcher, George Cremaschi or dancer Nicole Bindler) playing in Argentina, Uruguay, Chile, and Austria. Kaplan and Kurzmann's music has been showcased in recordings like Una Casa/Observatorio (Three Chairs Records, 2011) and Casa Corp (Dromos Records, 2012), both with Chilean saxophonist Edén Carrasco and Shortening Distances (L'innomable, 2013) with British saxophonist John Butcher.

More Kaplan's recordings through that time include Moments of Falling Petals (Dromos, 2009), with Edén Carrasco and Tetuzi Akiyama (Audition Records, 2011) compiling unreleased recordings from the Diego Chamy, Axel Dörner, and Ivar Grydeland era, and a solo trumpet track issued as part of Another Timbre's Anonymous Zone project (Another Timbre, 2013).

In 2011 Kaplan formed a duo with trumpeter Birgit Ulher. Their first album in 2015 called Stereo Trumpet was released by Relative Pitch Records. Both musicians have played together for many years, having toured Argentina, Chile, and Germany repeatedly. In 2013 he started a new project with Austrian sine waves minimalistic Klaus Filip. The album Tocando Fondo was released on Another Timbre (UK) in November 2015.

== Discography ==
- Christof Kurzmann, Leonel Kaplan (2022) Pandemic Conversations. Catalytic Artist Album
- Various Artists (2019) New Improvised Music from Buenos Aires. ESP-Disk
- Klaus Filip & Leonel Kaplan (2015). Tocando Fondo. Another Timbre
- Birgit Ulher & Leonel Kaplan (2015). Stereo Trumpet. Relative Pitch Records
- John Butcher, Christof Kurzmann & Leonel Kaplan (2013). Shortening Distances. L’innomable
- Christof Kurzmann, Edén Carrasco & Leonel Kaplan (2012). Casa Corp. Dromos Records
- Christof Kurzmann, Edén Carrasco & Leonel Kaplan (2011). Una Casa/Observatorio. Three Chairs Recordings
- Ivar Grydeland, Leonel Kaplan, Axel Dörner & Diego Chamy (2011). Portraits 2004. Audition Records
- Tetuzi Akiyama, Edén Carrasco & Leonel Kaplan (2009). Moments of Falling Petals. Dromos Records
- Nate Wooley, Audrey Chen & Leonel Kaplan (2006). Silo. Utech Records
- Axel Dörner, Leonel Kaplan & Diego Chamy (2005). Absence. Creative Sources

== Appears on ==
"A Second Shadow" (Recorded 022) - Christine Sehnaoui
"Sixty Interpretations of Sixty Seconds of Sixty Solo Improvisers" (AP 04) - Various Artists -
"Then & Now" (Trost Records 120) - Christof Kurzmann
"Theoral No.8" (Theoral) - Christof Kurzmann
