= The Tony Oxley/Alan Davie Duo =

Live album by Tony Oxley and Alan Davie
- Released: 1975; 2003
- Recorded: 1974–1975
- Venue: various
- Genre: Free improvisation
- Length: 51:03
- Label: ADMW; 005 a/l/l 005
- Producer: Tony Oxley

Tony Oxley chronology
Tony Oxley (1975)	The Tony Oxley/Alan Davie Duo (1975)	February Papers (1977)

The Tony Oxley/Alan Davie Duo is an album by percussionist Tony Oxley and multi-instrumentalist Alan Davie. It was recorded during 1974 and 1975 at various live and studio locations, and was initially released on vinyl on Davie's ADMW (Alan Davie Music Workshop) label. In 2003, it was reissued on CD in remastered form with two bonus tracks by the German label a/l/l, an imprint of FMP.

== Reception ==
Professional ratings
Review scores
Source	Rating
AllMusic	3/5 stars
The Penguin Guide to Jazz	3.5/4 stars

In a review for AllMusic, François Couture noted that the reissue was "a pleasure to rediscover," and stated that, with the exception of "Fish Fascinator," the album "remains fresh and challenging."

The authors of The Penguin Guide to Jazz Recordings wrote: "There's no outstanding track, just a record of a highly sympathetic musical encounter. Davie's reputation as a musician has never caught up with that as an artist, which seems a pity."

JazzWord's Ken Waxman noted "how many conceptions including World music echoes, folk root allusions, musqiue concrète and pure improv, were touched upon on these tracks," and commented: "Even more conspicuous is how the two were mixing and matching the genres at that early date, more so than Oxley does now."

A reviewer for Coda called the album "a remarkable merger of two very exploratory talents, Oxley then expanding his percussion pallette further into electronics and Davie applying his painter's sense of form and color to a host of reed, string and percussion experiments."

Writing for Bells, Henry Kuntz remarked: "These are mainly textural explorations... that work for a time in different areas, employing various combinations of sounds and instruments... This is probably how 'mainstream' modern music should sound: with a sense of its roots (without being stuck there), a hint of the future, a formal contemporaneity, and a lot of solid musicianship. Recommended."

== Track listing ==
1. "Song for the Little Dog" – 5:32
2. "Cavern of the Snail for Cello And Cymbals" – 6:42
3. "Adventures with a Magic Ring" – 4:35
4. "Fruit Flambé" – 5:28
5. "Song for the Serpent" – 5:24
6. "On the Seashore" – 4:21 (bonus track on reissue)
7. "Fragment from a Suite 'Country Music'" – 3:29
8. "Fish Fascinator" – 6:25
9. "'Bird Trap' for Violin and Cello" – 3:37
10. "High Tide Mark" – 4:56 (bonus track on reissue)
- Tracks 1, 4, 5, and 10 were recorded live on 6 June 1974, during a concert at Gimpel Hanover Galerie Zürich. Track 2 was recorded on 5 September 1974 in Cornwall, England. Track 3 was recorded on 16 January 1974 in Hertford, England. Track 6 was recorded on 4 September 1974 in Cornwall. Tracks 7, 8, and 9 were recorded on 5 March 1975 in Hertford.

== Personnel ==
- Tony Oxley – percussion, violin, ring modulator, compressor, octave splitter
- Alan Davie – piano, cello, sopranino saxophone, bass clarinet, vibraphone, xylophone, ring modulator
