= The Advocate (album) =

Album by Tony Oxley

Studio album by Tony Oxley
- Released: 2007
- Recorded: 1975 and 2006
- Studio: London
- Genre: Free improvisation
- Length: 40:14
- Label: Tzadik; TZ 7618

Tony Oxley chronology
S.O.H. Live in London (2007)	The Advocate (2007)	Tony Oxley/Derek Bailey Quartet (2008)

The Advocate is an album by percussionist and electronic musician Tony Oxley on which he is joined by guitarist Derek Bailey. Three of the album's four tracks were recorded by Oxley and Bailey during 1975 in a London studio, while the remaining track, a tribute to Bailey, was recorded live by Oxley at a concert held at the Barbican Centre in London in 2006, shortly after the guitarist's death. The album was released in 2007 by Tzadik Records as part of their Key Series.

== Reception ==
Professional ratings
Review scores
Source	Rating
All About Jazz	3.5/5 stars
AllMusic	3.5/5 stars
The Penguin Guide to Jazz	3/4 stars

In a review for AllMusic, Thom Jurek described Bailey's playing as "plucking, scraping, scratching and haltingly slipping around the guitar like an idea regarded as a series of possibilities more than as a single instrument to be forcefully attacked," while Oxley "uses the entire drum kit, as well as myriad other surfaces, as something with which to explore the essence of percussion's role in separating space more than something to merely 'play' rhythmically." He concluded: "For those who still look to this point in the mid-'70s as a pioneering moment in improvisational music, the document is more than a curiosity piece; it's a piece of found treasure."

The authors of The Penguin Guide to Jazz Recordings stated that, in places, the music is "almost combative, as if two like-minded players were engaged in a (mostly) good-natured tussle." They called the opening track "terrific," and noted that "Oxley's amplified percussion is as strikingly original as ever."

== Track listing ==
1. "Sheffield Phantoms" – 13:57
2. "Medicine Men" – 3:52
3. "Playroom" – 12:24
4. "The Advocate - For Derek Bailey" – 9:54

== Personnel ==
- Tony Oxley – percussion, electronics
- Derek Bailey – guitar (tracks 1–3)
