= The Baptised Traveller =

Studio album by Tony Oxley
- Released: 1969
- Recorded: 3 January 1969
- Genre: Free jazz
- Length: 38:51
- Label: CBS
- Producer: David Howells

Tony Oxley chronology
The Baptised Traveller (1969)	4 Compositions for Sextet (1970)

The Baptised Traveller is the debut album by English free-jazz drummer Tony Oxley, which was recorded in 1969, released on CBS as part of their Realm Jazz Series and reissued on CD by Columbia in 1999. The album, the first of a trilogy that Oxley recorded for major labels, has enjoyed legendary status for years as an avant-garde classic.

== Background ==
Oxley won the Melody Maker Readers Jazz Poll this year and was more or less permanent drummer at London's Ronnie Scott Club in an accompanying role. But his music, as presented on this record, had not been heard. The album features an all-star lineup of British avant jazz carefully chosen with trumpeter Kenny Wheeler, saxophonist Evan Parker, guitarist Derek Bailey and bassist Jeff Clyne.

== Music ==
The opener, "Crossing", was written by Oxley in 1964, when he was still living in his native Yorkshire studying and teaching. "Stone Garden" is an arrangement of a tune Oxley culled from his experience of accompanying its composer, altoist Charlie Mariano, at the Ronnie Scott club. The final track, "Preparation", is a ten-note row treated serially, its theme is played in half-time as a canon.

The Penguin Guide to Jazz notes that Oxley's pieces "move relatively slowly, even if there is a lot of surface detail." According to British music writer Ben Watson, "the record has a manifesto-like quality. By beginning with themes reminiscent of bop and modal jazz, Oxley was portraying the origins of the new music. The album culminates in 'Preparation', by which the time the syntax known as Free Improvisation has arrived."

== Reception ==
Professional ratings
Review scores
Source	Rating
The Penguin Guide to Jazz	(Crown award)

The Penguin Guide to Jazz awarded the record one of its rare crown accolades and says that "Oxley's stately reading of Charlie Mariano's 'Stone Garden' is one of the masterworks of contemporary improvised music, a slow chorale rooted in Bailey's chiming guitar chords."

The All About Jazz review by Clifford Allen notes that "though The Baptised Traveller might seem a conservative step for its participants – a far cry from later projects – it is in reality a swan song for the known possibilities of mainstream jazz, and an exuberant cry for the unknowns of the avant-garde."

In his book Derek Bailey and the Story of Free Improvisation, music writer Ben Watson claims about the record "If people say that British jazz had produced no masterpieces, it's an illusion created by the fact that CBS had no idea how to market this album."

== Track listing ==
All compositions by Tony Oxley except as indicated

1. "Crossing / Arrival" – 17:37
2. "Stone Garden" (Charlie Mariano) – 17:10
3. "Preparation" – 4:04

== Personnel ==
- Evan Parker – tenor sax
- Kenny Wheeler – trumpet, flugelhorn
- Derek Bailey – guitar
- Jeff Clyne – bass
- Tony Oxley – drums
