= Digger's Harvest =

Live album by Alexander von Schlippenbach and Tony Oxley
- Released: 1999
- Recorded: November 5 and 7, 1998
- Venues: Podewil, Berlin
- Genre: Free improvisation
- Length: 1:18:28
- Labels: FMP; CD 103
- Producer: Jost Gebers

Alexander von Schlippenbach chronology
Tangens (1998)	Digger's Harvest (1999)	Complete Combustion (1999)

Tony Oxley chronology
Soho Suites (1997)	Digger's Harvest (1999)	Triangular Screen (2000)

Digger's Harvest is a live album by pianist Alexander von Schlippenbach and drummer Tony Oxley. It was recorded on November 5 and 7, 1998, at the Podewil in Berlin, and was released in 1999 by FMP/Free Music Production.

== Reception ==
Professional ratings
Review scores
Source	Rating
AllMusic	4.5/5 stars
The Encyclopedia of Popular Music	4/5 stars
The Penguin Guide to Jazz	4/4 stars

In a review for AllMusic, Steve Loewy stated that the album "find[s] both of these marvelous musicians in fine form, the energy level rarely abating," and wrote: "Unobtrusive, yet continuously creative, Oxley is the Max Roach of free jazz. When paired with von Schlippenbach, the results can be -- as they are here -- a successful integration of continuous invention and refined sensibility."

The authors of The Penguin Guide to Jazz Recordings awarded the album a full 4 stars, calling it "a fine record," and commenting: "The titles are drawn from the names of poisonous plants, and there is a sharp and sometimes toxic edge to these improvisations... Oxley is the dominant presence almost throughout... simply because what he plays is more immediately compelling. Yet Schlippenbach is worth listening to with some care as well."

Bill Shoemaker of JazzTimes described the album as "a timely reminder of Schlippenbach's many achievements and how... [he] continues to create compelling music." He remarked: "Given Schlippenbach and Oxley's respective histories... it's odd that they hadn't previously worked as a duo. It proves to be an excellent match, though."

Author Todd S. Jenkins noted: "The more European seasoning of Oxley's percussing, moderated by an abstruse understanding of the jazz continuum, pays off in pulling deeper jazziness out of the pianist. The long opening track, 'Grains and Roots', almost exhausts the listener with its endless flow of sonic activity. The series of shorter improvs in various tints of blue and red grants us the second wind to endure the equally long and stimulating title track."

== Track listing ==
All music by Alexander von Schlippenbach and Tony Oxley.

1. "Grains And Roots" - 27:39
2. "Deadly Nightshade" - 6:41
3. "Thorn Apple" - 4:05
4. "Toad Stool" - 3:24
5. "Henbane" - 5:54
6. "Flyagaric" - 4:18
7. "Digger's Harvest" - 26:27

== Personnel ==
- Alexander von Schlippenbach – piano
- Tony Oxley – drums
