= Alan Davie =

Scottish painter and musician (1920–2014)

- Born: James Alan Davie; 28 September 1920; Grangemouth, Scotland
- Died: 5 April 2014 (aged 93)
- Awards: Guthrie Award, 1942

James Alan Davie (28 September 1920 – 5 April 2014) was a Scottish painter and musician.

== Biography ==
Davie was born in Grangemouth, Scotland in 1920, the son of Elizabeth (née Turnbull) and James William Davie, an art teacher and painter who exhibited at the Salon des Artistes Français in 1925. Alan Davie studied at Edinburgh College of Art from 1937 to 1941. An early exhibition of his work came through the Society of Scottish Artists.

After the Second World War, Davie played tenor saxophone in the Tommy Sampson Orchestra, which was based in Edinburgh and broadcast and toured in Europe. He also earned a living making jewellery during the postwar period. Davie travelled widely and in Venice became influenced by other painters of the period, such as Paul Klee, Jackson Pollock and Joan Miró, as well as by a wide range of cultural symbols.

Although Peggy Guggenheim purchased two of Davie's paintings in Venice, and the works in his 1956 exhibition in New York sold out, he did not achieve recognition and commercial success in Britain until his 1958 exhibition at Wakefield Art Gallery and Whitechapel Gallery.

His painting style owes much to his affinity with Zen. Having read Eugen Herrigel's book Zen in the Art of Archery (1953), he assimilated the spontaneity which Zen emphasises. Declaring that the spiritual path is incompatible with planning ahead, he attempted to paint as automatically as possible, which was intended to bring forth elements of his unconscious. In this, he shared a vision with surrealist painters such as Miró, and he was also fascinated by the work of psychoanalyst Carl Jung.

Like Pollock, many of Davie's works were executed by standing above the painting, which was laid on the ground. He added layers of paint until sometimes the original painting had been covered over many times. Despite the speed at which he worked (he usually had several paintings on the go at once), however, he was adamant that his images are not pure abstraction, but all have significance as symbols. Championing the primitive, he saw the role of the artist as akin to that of the shaman, and remarked upon how disparate cultures have adopted common symbols in their visual languages.

In addition to painting, whether on canvas or paper (he has stated that he prefers to work on paper), Davie produced several screenprints. He found a public for his work on the continent and in America some time before the British art public could reconcile itself to his mixture of ancient and newly invented symbols. In his lectures Davie stressed the importance of improvisation as his chosen method. His stance was that of an inspired soothsayer resisting the inroads of rational civilization.

Musically, Davie also played piano, cello and bass clarinet. In the early 1970s his interest in free improvisation led to a close association with the percussionist Tony Oxley. His paintings have also inspired music by others, notably the bassist and composer Barry Guy.

Davie designed the jacket for R.W. Feachem's book Prehistoric Scotland, published by Batsford in 1963. The design was based upon motifs found on Pictish symbol stones.

On 29 October 1947, in Edinburgh, Davie married Janet Gaul, a potter, artist, and designer. Together they had one child, a daughter, Jane, born in 1949. He died aged 93 in Hertfordshire, England on 5 April 2014.

=== Art collections ===
Art collections and museums owning work by Alan Davie include the Art Institute of Chicago, Dallas Museum of Art, Fine Arts Museums of San Francisco, Metropolitan Museum of Art, Museum of Modern Art, National Galleries of Scotland, Peggy Guggenheim Collection, Tate Gallery, Art Gallery of New South Wales, Brauer Museum of Art at Valparaiso University, Fred Jones Jr. Museum of Art at the University of Oklahoma, Harvard University Art Museums, Hirshhorn Museum and Sculpture Garden, Mildred Lane Kemper Art Museum, Oklahoma City Museum of Art, The Priseman Seabrook Collection, San Diego Museum of Art, Southampton City Art Gallery, The Hepworth Wakefield and Worcester City Art Gallery & Museum.

=== Portraits of Alan Davie ===
A photographic portrait exists in both the National Portrait Gallery collection and Gimpel Fils, a modern and contemporary art gallery in Mayfair. There is also a John Bellany self-portrait featuring Davie in the National Galleries of Scotland.

== Discography ==
- The Alan Davie Music Workshop (ADMW, 1970)
- Suite for Prepared Piano and Mini Drums (ADMW, 1971)
- Bird Through the Wall (ADMW, 1971)
- Phantom in the Room (ADMW, 1971)
- The Tony Oxley/Alan Davie Duo (ADMW, 1975)
- Elaboration of Particulars (Confront, 2021)
