= The Enchanted Messenger =

Live album by Tony Oxley Celebration Orchestra featuring Bill Dixon
- Released: 1995
- Recorded: November 20, 1994
- Venue: Berlin Jazz Festival, Haus der Kulturen der Welt, Berlin
- Genre: Free jazz
- Length: 1:08:23
- Label: Soul Note; 121284-2
- Producer: George Gruntz

The Enchanted Messenger is a live album by a fifteen-piece ensemble called the Tony Oxley Celebration Orchestra, led by English percussionist Tony Oxley, and with trumpeter Bill Dixon appearing as a featured artist. It was recorded in November 1994 at the Haus der Kulturen der Welt on the last day of the Berlin Jazz Festival, and was released in 1995 by Soul Note. The album documents a realization of a 19-part graphic score by Oxley. The performance, which was preceded by two days of rehearsal, was also broadcast on Berlin radio and television.

== Reception ==
Professional ratings
Review scores
Source	Rating
The Penguin Guide to Jazz	3.5/4 stars

The authors of the Penguin Guide to Jazz Recordings called The Enchanted Messenger "a superb large-scale composition," and commented: "It is possible to follow the course of this intriguing performance as it gradually dismantles its own initial premises and pushes out into areas of freedom which only the London Jazz Composers' Orchestra and Globe Unity Orchestra have been able to explore with similar conviction... Not an easy record to absorb in just one or two sittings, but one that repays careful and prolonged attention."

Ron Welburn, writing for Jazz Times, stated: "The veteran Oxley directs his ensemble... to achieve powerful undercurrents in sound collage. Mobile units signify chance elements, and resulting timbres obliterate the boundaries between music, architecture, and abstract lithography... the stellar music all create is well beyond the merely iconoclastic."

The Chicago Reader's Peter Margasak described the album as "a tour de force of large-scale improv."

== Track listing ==
Composed by Tony Oxley.

1. "Section 1" – 5:35
2. "Section 2" – 1:45
3. "Section 3" – 2:29
4. "Section 4" – 1:55
5. "Section 5" – 3:27
6. "Section 6" – 1:57
7. "Section 7" – 2:55
8. "Section 8" – 1:25
9. "Section 9" – 3:57
10. "Section 10" – 3:04
11. "Section 11" – 9:34
12. "Section 12" – 4:16
13. "Section 13" – 1:04
14. "Section 14" – 3:00
15. "Section 15" – 4:39
16. "Section 16" – 6:44
17. "Section 17" – 4:02
18. "Section 18" – 1:34
19. "Section 19" – 5:01

== Personnel ==
- Tony Oxley – drums, percussion, conductor
- Frank Gratkowski – saxophone, bass clarinet
- Ernst-Ludwig Petrowsky – saxophone, clarinet
- Bill Dixon – trumpet, flugelhorn
- Johannes Bauer – trombone
- Alex Kolkowski – violin
- Philipp Wachsmann – violin, electronics
- Marcio Mattos – cello
- Alfred Zimmerlin – cello
- Phil Minton – voice
- Matt Wand – electronics
- Pat Thomas – piano, electronics
- Jo Thönes – drums, percussion
- Stefan Hölker – drums, percussion
- Tony Levin – drums, percussion
