= Ichnos (album) =

Studio album by Tony Oxley
- Released: 1971
- Genre: Free jazz
- Length: 40:12
- Label: RCA Victor; SF 8215

Tony Oxley chronology
4 Compositions for Sextet (1970)	Ichnos (1971)	Jazz in Britain '68-'69 (1972)

Ichnos is an album by English musician Tony Oxley. Released in 1971 by RCA Victor, it features Oxley on percussion, Evan Parker on saxophone, Kenny Wheeler on trumpet and flugelhorn, Paul Rutherford on trombone, Derek Bailey on electric guitar, and Barry Guy on double bass. The musicians are heard in varying combinations: two sextets, two quartets, and a percussion solo.

== Reception ==
Professional ratings
Review scores
Source	Rating
AllMusic	3/5 stars
The Encyclopedia of Popular Music	3/5 stars
Tom Hull – on the Web	B+

In a review for Paris Transatlantic, Graham L. Rogers wrote: "This is powerful work from a time and place when free improvisation was in its youth and talented musicians with uncluttered heads took risks and disregarded rules, creating the spontaneous, imaginative music which came to define the genre."

Author Ben Watson stated: "By seizing the timbral serialism of Webern and performing it with the expressive velocity of jazz, Oxley's group heralded almost everything new in music for the next three decades... It revives Edgard Varèse's project of a music that would organise itself according to the dictates of timbre and the impact of noise rather than overarching systems of harmony and rhythm." He concluded: "It makes all previous music sound grey."

The editors of Mats Gustafsson's Discaholic called the recording a "free music monster. Monumental, intricate, detailed and balanced music and just a classic album of the highest beauty!" They commented: "The solo excursions on this album are magic beyond words... this is as good as it gets. Highest possible recommendations!"

== Track listing ==
Composed by Tony Oxley. Track timings not provided.

1. "Crossing" (sextet)
2. "Oryane" (percussion solo)
3. "Eiroc" (quartet)
4. "Santrel" (quartet)
5. "Cadilla" (sextet)

== Personnel ==
- Tony Oxley – drums, percussion
- Evan Parker – soprano saxophone, tenor saxophone
- Kenny Wheeler – trumpet, flugelhorn
- Paul Rutherford – trombone
- Derek Bailey – electric guitar
- Barry Guy – double bass
