= Blå =

Coordinates: 59°55′13″N 10°45′10″E

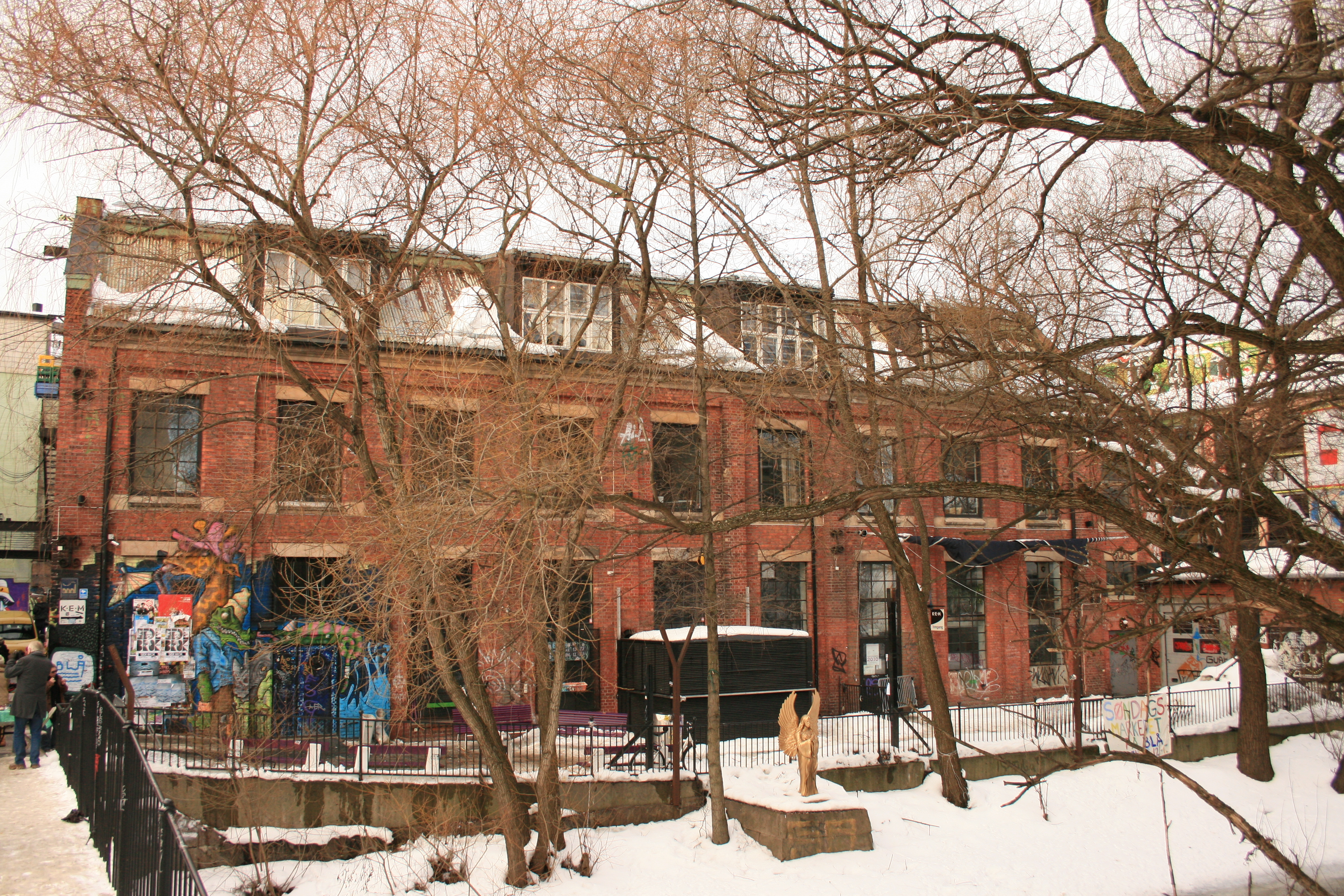
Exterior

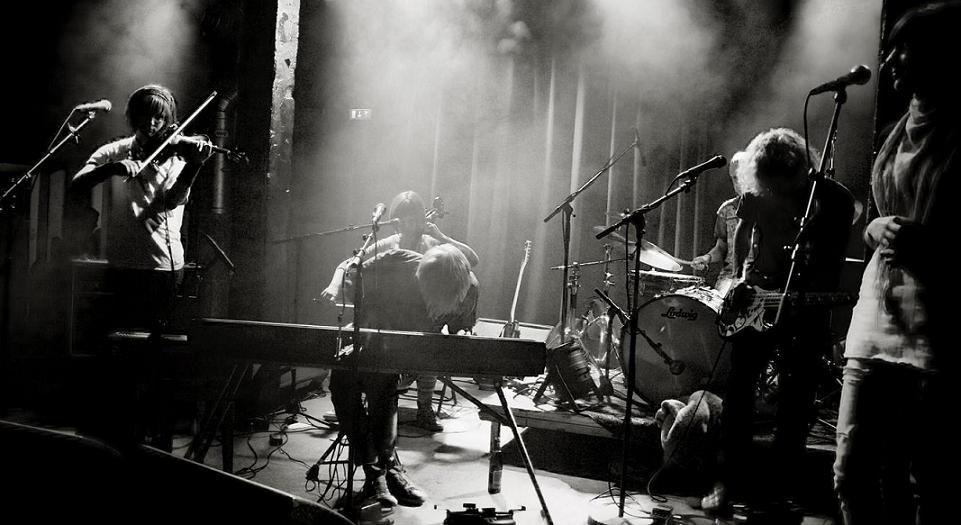
A jazz performance at Blå

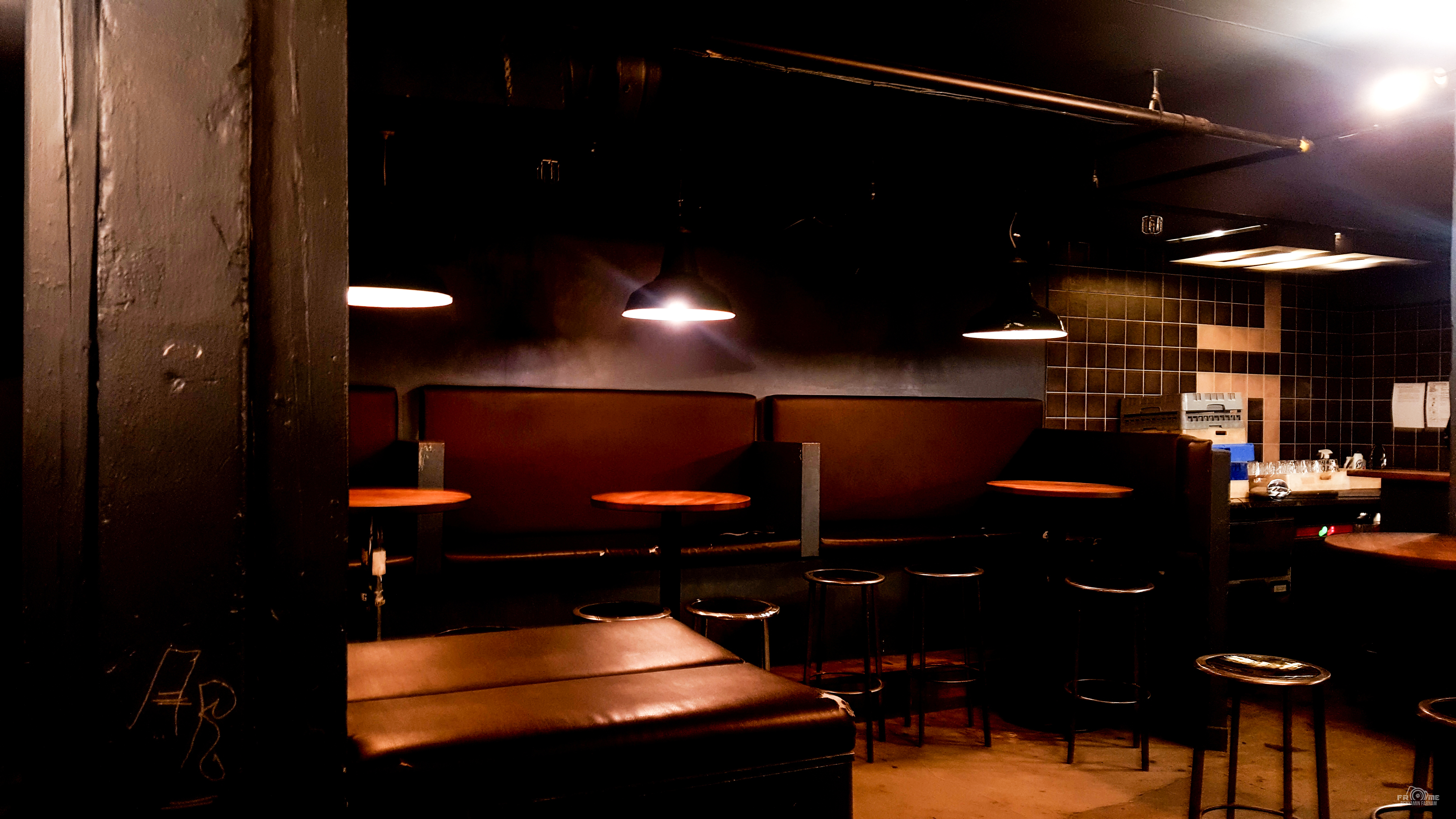
Interior

Blå ("Blue") is a jazz club in Grünerløkka, Oslo, Norway.

Blå opened on February 28, 1998; the initiators were Kjell Einar Karlsen and Martin Revheim. It is located in factory building close to Akerselva, a river running through downtown. Darwin Porter of Frommer's describes the club as "the leading jazz club to Oslo. Dark and industrial, with lots of wrought iron and mellow lighting, this place books some of the best jazz acts in the world. The crowd is a mix of young and old, dressed in casual, but sophisticated attire." Despite this, the club has also featured other music genres, such as pop, rock, electronic and hip-hop. Originally, Konsertforeninga Blå was responsible for the concert events, while Brenneriveien Jazzhus ran the bar. The working relationship between the two became difficult in 2006, and the Concert Association withdrew. After this, Blå Booking has been responsible for the cultural part.

After this, the concert association was included as a planned participant in a similar place in the Vulkan area a little further up the river, but this was not successful. The association now operates as an organizer of concerts and other events at various locations in Oslo.
