= Tony Oxley =

British jazz drummer and electronic musician (1938–2023)

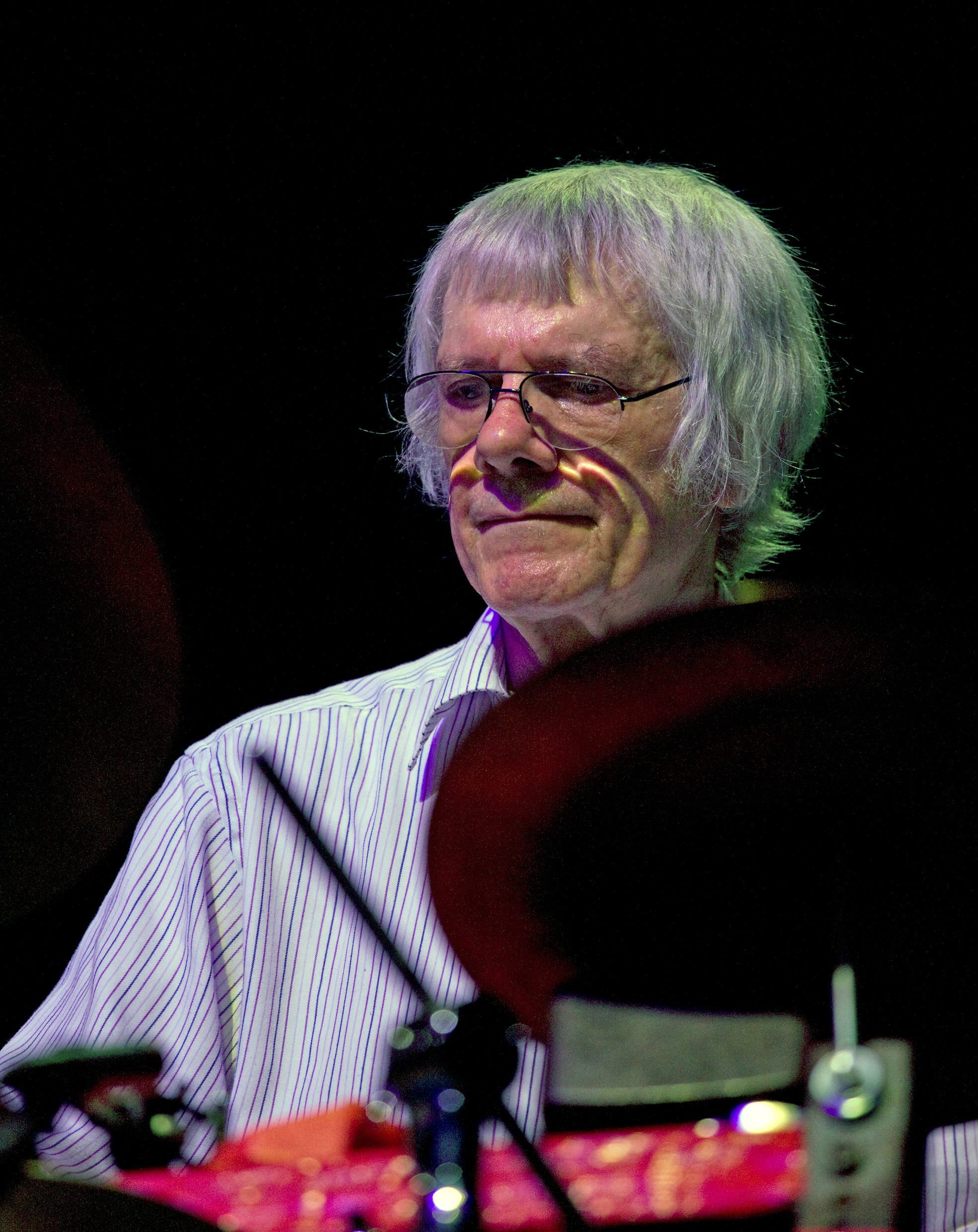
- Oxley at the Moers Festival, Germany, in 2008

Background information
- Born: 15 June 1938; Sheffield, West Riding of Yorkshire, England
- Died: 26 December 2023 (aged 85)
- Genres: Avant-garde jazz, free jazz, free improvisation, fusion
- Occupation: Musician
- Instrument: Drums
- Years active: 1960s–2020s
- Labels: Incus, FMP

Tony Oxley (15 June 1938 – 26 December 2023) was an English free improvising drummer and electronic musician.

Born in Sheffield, Oxley moved to London in 1966 and became house drummer at Ronnie Scott's Jazz Club where he accompanied visiting musicians such as Joe Henderson, Lee Konitz, Charlie Mariano, Stan Getz, Sonny Rollins, and Bill Evans until the early 1970s. Each year between 1969 and 1972 he topped the Melody Maker annual jazz readers poll for drummers. In 1970 Oxley helped found Incus Records, with Derek Bailey and others; the label would go on to release more than 50 albums.

In 1993 he joined a quartet with Tomasz Stańko, Bobo Stenson and Anders Jormin, and regularly released albums under his own name throughout the 2000s. His last albums were Unreleased 1974–2016 (2022) and The New World (2023), both released on the Discus label.

== Biography ==
Tony Oxley was born in Sheffield, West Riding of Yorkshire, England, on 15 June 1938. A self-taught pianist by the age of eight, he first began playing the drums at seventeen. In Sheffield he was taught by Haydon Cook. While playing evening gigs with local dance bands at night, he was sacked from his regular job, at a cutlery-making company, for falling asleep.

During his National Service, with the Black Watch military band, from 1957 to 1960, he studied music theory and improved his drumming technique. After leaving the army he became a member of a dance band playing for passengers on the Queen Mary and made several trips to New York. When on shore leave he would visit clubs and hear some of the leading modern jazz figures such as Philly Joe Jones, Horace Silver, Art Blakey. From 1960 to 1964 he led a quartet which performed locally in England. Between transatlantic trips he played in a cabaret band in Chesterfield.

By 1963 Oxley was also playing Saturday afternoon gigs with other aspiring young jazz musicians at the Grapes pub in Sheffield. In 1963 he began working with Gavin Bryars and guitarist Derek Bailey, in a trio known as Joseph Holbrooke. Oxley moved to London in 1966 and became house drummer at Ronnie Scott's, where he accompanied visiting musicians such as Joe Henderson, Lee Konitz, Charlie Mariano, Stan Getz, Sonny Rollins, and Bill Evans until the early 1970s. He was a member of bands led by Gordon Beck and Mike Pyne.

In 1969 Oxley appeared on the John McLaughlin album Extrapolation and formed a quintet with Bailey, Jeff Clyne, Evan Parker, and Kenny Wheeler, releasing the album The Baptised Traveller. Following this album the group was joined by Paul Rutherford on trombone and became a sextet, releasing the 1970 album 4 Compositions for Sextet. That same year Oxley helped found Incus Records with Bailey and others and Musicians Cooperative. The label would go on to release more than 50 albums, continuing even after disagreements caused first Oxley and then Parker to leave. He received a three-month artist-in-residence job at the Sydney Conservatorium in Australia in 1970. Around this time he joined the London Jazz Composers Orchestra and collaborated with Howard Riley.

Oxley was also a member of the saxophonist Alan Skidmore's quintet, which in 1969 won awards at the Montreux Jazz Festival for best group, best soloist and best drummer. With the trio of the pianist Howard Riley, he began using amplification on his expanding drum kit. Each year between 1969 and 1972 he topped the Melody Maker annual jazz readers poll for drummers. In 1973 he became a tutor at the Jazz Summer School in Barry, South Wales, and in 1974 he formed the band Angular Apron. Through the 1980s he worked with Tony Coe and Didier Levallet and started the Celebration Orchestra during the latter half of the decade. In the late 1980s, Oxley toured and recorded with Anthony Braxton, and also began a working relationship with Cecil Taylor.

In 1993 he joined a quartet with Tomasz Stańko, Bobo Stenson and Anders Jormin. In 2000 he released the album Triangular Screen with the Tony Oxley Project 1, a trio with Ivar Grydeland and Tonny Kluften.

Oxley's own abstract paintings appeared on the covers of some of his later albums, including his last, The New World, a recording of electronic and acoustic percussion music, released on the Discus label in 2023.

== Personal life and death ==
Oxley married Tutta (nee Rütten) in 2000.

He died on 26 December 2023, at the age of 85.

== Discography ==
=== As leader ===
- The Baptised Traveller (CBS, 1969)
- 4 Compositions for Sextet (CBS, 1970)
- Ichnos (RCA Victor, 1971)
- Jazz in Britain '68–'69 with John Surman, Alan Skidmore (Decca Eclipse, 1972)
- Tony Oxley (Incus, 1975)
- The Tony Oxley/Alan Davie Duo with Alan Davie (ADMW, 1975)
- February Papers (Incus, 1977)
- S. O. H. (EGO, 1979)
- Ach Was!? with Ulrich Gumpert, Radu Malfatti (FMP, 1981)
- SOH (View, 1981)
- Nutty On Willisau with Tony Coe (Hat Hut, 1984)
- Live at Roccella Jonica with Norma Winstone, Kenny Wheeler, Paolo Fresu, John Taylor, Paolo Damiani (Ismez/Polis Music, 1985)
- Tomorrow is Here Jazzfest Berlin 1985, Live from the Philharmonie (Dossier, 1986)
- The Glider & The Grinder with Philipp Wachsmann (Bead, 1987)
- Live in Roccella Jonica 1986 with Palle Mikkelborg, Charlie Mariano, Paolo Damiani, Tiziana Ghiglioni (Ismez/Polis, 1987)
- Bodies with Claudio Fasoli, Mick Goodrick, Palle Danielsson (New Sound Planet, 1990)
- Explore with Stefano Battaglia (Splasc(H), 1990)
- In the Evenings out There with Paul Bley, Gary Peacock, John Surman (ECM, 1993)
- The Tony Oxley Quartet (Incus, 1993)
- Sulphur with Stefano Battaglia, Paolino Dalla Porta (Splasc(H), 1995)
- The Enchanted Messenger (Soul Note, 1995)
- Deep with Ekkehard Jost, Reiner Winterschladen, Ewald Oberleitner (Fish Music, 1997)
- Soho Suites (Recordings from 1977 & 1995) with Derek Bailey (Incus, 1997)
- Digger's Harvest with Alexander von Schlippenbach (FMP, 1999)
- Triangular Screen (Sofa, 2000)
- Floating Phantoms (a/l/l, 2002)
- GratHovOx with Frank Gratkowski, Fred Van Hove (Nuscope, 2002)
- S.O.H. Live in London with Alan Skidmore, Ali Haurand (Jazzwerkstatt 2007)
- The Advocate with Derek Bailey (Tzadik, 2007)
- Tony Oxley/Derek Bailey Quartet (Jazzwerkstatt, 2008)
- Live at Jazzwerkstatt Peitz with Conny Bauer, Gianluigi Trovesi, Dietmar Diesner (Jazzwerkstatt 2008)
- Improvised Pieces for Trio with Sebastiano Meloni, Adriano Orru (Big Round, 2010)
- A Birthday Tribute: 75 years (Incus, 2013)
- Beaming (Confront Recordings, 2020)
- Elaboration of Particulars (Confront, 2021) recorded in 1977 and 1978
- Unreleased 1974–2016 (Discus, 2022)
- The New World (Discus, 2022)

With The Quartet

- Dedications (Konnex, 1984)
- Relation (Konnex, 1985)
- Interchange (Konnex, 1986)
- Live (Konnex, 1987)

=== As guest ===
With Gordon Beck

- Gyroscope (Morgan, 1969)
- Seven Steps to Evans – A Tribute to the Compositions of Bill Evans (MPS, 1980)

With Gordon Beck Quartet

- Experiments with Pops (Major Minor, 1968)
- When Sunny Gets Blue (Spring '68 Sessions) (Turtle, 2018)

With Bill Dixon

- Vade Mecum (Soul Note, 1994)
- Vade Mecum II (Soul Note, 1994)
- Papyrus Volume I (Soul Note, 1999)
- Papyrus Volume II (Soul Note, 1999)
- Berlin Abbozzi (FMP, 2000)

With Barry Guy/London Jazz Composers Orchestra

- Ode (Incus, 1972)
- Stringer (FMP, 1983)
- Zurich Concerts (Intakt, 1988)

With Joseph Holbrooke

- ' 98 (Incus 2000)
- The Moat Recordings (Tzadik, 2006)

With Rolf Kühn

- Devil in Paradise (BASF, 1971)
- Going to the Rainbow (BASF, 1971)

With Howard Riley

- Flight (Turtle, 1971)
- Synopsis (Incus 1974)
- Overground (Emanem, 2001)

With Tomasz Stańko

- Matka Joanna (ECM, 1995)
- Leosia (ECM, 1997)

With John Surman

- How Many Clouds Can You See? (Deram, 1970)
- Adventure Playground (ECM, 1992)

With Cecil Taylor

- Leaf Palm Hand (Disc 6 of 11-disc set Cecil Taylor in Berlin '88) (FMP, 1989)
- Looking (Berlin Version) The Feel Trio (FMP, 1990)
- Looking (Berlin Version) Corona (FMP, 1991)
- Celebrated Blazons (FMP, 1993)
- Melancholy (FMP, 1999)
- Nailed (FMP, 2000)
- 2 Ts for a Lovely T (Codanza, 2002)
- Taylor/Dixon/Oxley (Les Disques Victo, 2002)
- Ailanthus/Altissima: Bilateral Dimensions of 2 Root Songs (Triple Point, 2009)
- Conversations with Tony Oxley (Jazzwerkstatt, 2018)
- Birdland, Neuburg 2011 (Fundacja Słuchaj!, 2020)
- Being Astral and All Registers – Power of Two (Discus, 2020)

=== With others ===
- Paul Bley, Chaos with Furio Di Castri (Soul Note, 1998)
- Anthony Braxton, Seven Compositions (Trio) 1989 (hatART, 1989)
- Peter Brötzmann, Berlin Djungle (FMP, 1987)
- Bill Evans, The 1972 Ljubljana Concert (2018)
- Georgie Fame, The Two Faces Of Fame (CBS, 1967)
- Michael Gibbs, Michael Gibbs (Deram, 1970)
- George Gruntz, Monster Sticksland Meeting Two: Monster Jazz (MPS, 1974)
- Tubby Hayes, Seven Steps to Heaven: Live at the Hopbine 1972 (Gearbox, 2013)
- Giorgio Gaslini & Jean-Luc Ponty, Jean-Luc Ponty Meets Giorgio Gaslini (1974)
- Don "Sugarcane" Harris, Keep On Driving (MPS, 1970)
- Didier Levallet, Scoop (In+Out, 1983)
- John McLaughlin, Extrapolation (1969)
- Mark Nauseef, All In All In All (Relative Pitch, 2018)
- Paul Rutherford & Iskra 1912, Sequences 72 & 73 (Emanem, 1997)
- Ronnie Scott, Live at Ronnie Scott's (CBS, 1968)
- Alan Skidmore, Once Upon a Time (Deram, 1970)
- Vangelis, Hypothesis (Bellaphon, 1978)
- Jasper van 't Hof and George Gruntz, Fairytale (MPS 1979)
- Kenny Wheeler, Song for Someone (Incus, 1973)

== Other sources ==
- Carr, Ian; Fairweather, Digby; Priestley, Brian (2004). The Rough Guide to Jazz, 3rd Edition. London: Rough Guides. ISBN 1-84353-256-5.
