= Beaming (album) =

Studio album by Tony Oxley
- Released: 2020
- Recorded: November 25, 2019
- Studio: Viersen, Germany
- Genre: Free improvisation
- Length: 49:45
- Label: Confront Recordings core 13
- Producer: Mark Wastell

Tony Oxley chronology
A Birthday Tribute: 75 years (2013)	Beaming (2020)	Elaboration of Particulars (2021)

Beaming is an album by Tony Oxley. It was recorded on November 25, 2019, in Viersen, Germany, and was released in 2020 by Confront Recordings. The album features Oxley on electronics, plus percussionist Stefan Hölker, in a context in which improvisations by both musicians are combined with percussion music performed and recorded by Oxley in 1972.

According to Derek Bailey, Oxley's percussion setup included "amplified frame containing cymbals, wires, various kitchen equipment, motor generators, springs, used with 3 contact mikes (home-made), 2 volume pedals, 1 octave splitter, 1 compressor, 1 ring modulator and oscillator, 1 amplifier and 2 speakers," with the term "frame" accounting for the track titles.

== Reception ==
Professional ratings
Review scores
Source	Rating
All About Jazz	4/5 stars
Jazz Journal	3/4 stars

In a review for All About Jazz, John Eyles wrote: "Despite being created by two drummers, while their music has a definite pulse, they do not overtly keep time; instead, using that uncanny knack which the best improvising drummers have, they pay attention to textural sounds while ensuring the underlying pulse remains implicit throughout... they never clash or work against one another, but together combine to create soundscapes which are deep and rich in detail, making them endlessly fascinating. A triumph for Oxley and Hölker."

Brian Morton of Jazz Journal called the album "a remarkable performance," and stated: "So carefully and coherently programmed is the electronic component that it's hard to hear this as two voices at all... There is a clear rhythm to these pieces, but it can't be counted in any conventional way. Sometimes it's accumulative; sometimes fragmented into metrical cells; but it's always there and that's what makes what might otherwise be offputtingly abstract music so compelling."

Point of Departure's Michael Rosenstein commented: "From the initial chimes, shuddering rattles, gongs, clinks, and clatter, it is impossible to separate Hölker's contributions from Oxley's. Each improvisation leaps into a collectively enveloping sound world full of rich resonance and a multiplicity of timbral colors. Listening to each of the pieces is akin to being submersed in a sonic stream as the music surges with propulsive energy... This release is truly unique in [Oxley's] expansive career and well worth searching out."

Writing for The New York City Jazz Record, Mark Keresman remarked: "If one seeks pure drumming, one could be a touch nonplussed here. Here it's the interplay of these two that produces the array of sound(s) herein... Beaming is unlikely to make many—heck, any—converts to the art of rough-hewn sonic alchemy. But for those valuing (or, simply, used to) this kind of din, it's a shot of bracing beverage."

== Track listing ==
1. "Frame I" – 14:35
2. "Frame II" – 4:58
3. "Frame III" – 6:02
4. "Frame IV" – 6:20
5. "Frame V" – 3:35
6. "Frame VI" – 14:17

== Personnel ==
- Tony Oxley – electronics, concept
- Stefan Hölker – acoustic percussion
