= List of the Delft University of Technology Alumni =

This is an incomplete list of TU Delft graduates.

== A ==
- Laurens van den Acker, Dutch automobile designer and Vice President of Renault Corporate Design
- Mahir Alkaya, Dutch politician

== B ==
- Henk Badings, Dutch composer
- Henri Bal, Dutch computer scientist
- Ad Bax, Dutch biophysicist, contributor to protein nuclear magnetic resonance spectroscopy
- Lourens Baas Becking, Dutch botanist and microbiologist
- Carin ter Beek, Dutch rower, olympic medalist
- Reinout Willem van Bemmelen, Dutch geologist
- Lodewijk van den Berg, Dutch-American astronaut, payload specialist on STS-51B mission
- Maria Elisabeth Bes, Dutch chemical engineer and the first woman to graduate from TU Delft as an engineer
- Ben van Beurden, CEO of Royal Dutch Shell
- Wiebe Bijker, Dutch sociologists
- Kwasi Boakye, Dutch-Ashanti mining engineer
- Kees Boeke, Dutch Quaker missionary
- Jan Boerman, Dutch composer of electronic music
- Onno J. Boxma, Dutch queuing theorist
- Jo van den Broek, Dutch architect
- Gerrit Broekstra, Dutch systems scientist

== C ==
- Luis Chang, Peruvian engineer, transportation minister and ambassador
- Qingyan Chen, Chinese mechanical engineer
- Kees Christiaanse, Dutch architect
- Wim Cohen, Dutch mathematician
- Dirk Coster, Dutch physicist, discoverer of hafnium

== D ==
- Jacob Pieter Den Hartog, Dutch mechanical engineer, recipient of the Timoshenko Medal
- Wim Dik, Dutch politicus
- Harry Droog, Dutch rower, Olympic medalist

== E ==
- Erick van Egeraat, Dutch architect
- Gerritjan Eggenkamp, Dutch rower; 2004 Summer Olympics silver medalist
- Willem Alberda van Ekenstein, discoverer of Lobry de Bruyn–van Ekenstein transformation

== F ==
- Adriaan Fokker, Dutch musician and physicist, known for Fokker–Planck equation

== G ==
- Karien van Gennip, Dutch secretary of state for economic affairs
- Willem Frederik Gisolf, Dutch geologist
- Rik Grashoff, Dutch politician

== H ==
- Jaap Haartsen, Dutch engineer, inventor of Bluetooth
- N. John Habraken, Dutch architect, former Dean of MIT Department of Architecture
- Felienne Hermans, Dutch computer scientist
- Herman Hertzberger, Dutch architect
- Jacobus van 't Hoff, Dutch chemist and Nobel laureate
- Geert Hofstede, Dutch organizational sociologist
- Diederik Hol, Dutch engineer, inventor of Dual Box inline skating frame
- Gerard J. Holzmann, Dutch computer scientist, developer of SPIN model checker
- Adrian van Hooydonk, Dutch automobile designer, head of design at BMW
- Alexandre Horowitz, Dutch engineer, designer of Philishave
- Francine Houben, Dutch architect

== K ==
- Thomas Karsten, Dutch architect of Indonesia
- Abdul Qadeer Khan, Pakistani nuclear scientist; metallurgical engineer; known as the "father of the Islamic nuclear bomb"
- Marc Koehler, Dutch architect
- Randal A. Koene, Dutch neuroscientist and neuroengineer, pioneer of whole brain emulation
- Warner T. Koiter, Dutch mechanical engineer
- Diederik Korteweg, Dutch mathematician
- Robert Kozma, Dutch mathematician, University of Memphis professor
- Frederik H. Kreuger, Dutch high voltage scientist and inventor
- Jón Kristinsson, Dutch architect
- Abraham Kuyper, Dutch politician, journalist, statesman and theologian, Prime Minister of the Netherlands

== L ==
- Harm Lagaay, Dutch automobile designer, former chief designer of Porsche
- Richard Lamb, Dutch strategic futurologist
- Cornelis Lely, Dutch engineer, chief designer of Zuiderzee Works
- Walter Lewin, Dutch physicist and MIT professor
- Kazimierz Leski, Polish engineer, designer of ORP Orzeł
- Otto Cornelis Adriaan van Lidth de Jeude, Dutch politician, Minister of War in the Dutch government in exile
- Liem Bwan Tjie, Indonesian architect and proponent of the Amsterdam School
- Wilhelmus Luxemburg, Dutch mathematician and California Institute of Technology professor

== M ==
- Winy Maas, Dutch architect, co-founder of MVRDV
- Han van Meegeren, Dutch painter and portraitist and art forger (studied, did not graduate)
- Simon van der Meer, Dutch engineer and Nobel Prize winner in physics
- Felix Andries Vening Meinesz, Dutch geologist
- Anne Menke, German-born photographer
- Bert Metz, Dutch climatologist, former co-chair of Intergovernmental Panel on Climate Change
- Hubertus van Mook, Dutch administrator in the East Indies (studied, did not graduate)
- Anton Mussert, Dutch politician of the Second World War era and founder of the National Socialist Movement in the Netherlands
- Bram Moolenaar, Dutch programmer, creator of Vim text editor
- Manuel Muhi, Filipino engineering professor, president of the Polytechnic University of the Philippines

== N ==
- Siegfried Nassuth, Dutch architect, author of Bijlmermeer
- Peter Newman, Australian environmental scientist (postdoctoral studies)
- Cornelius Van Niel, Dutch chemist who first demonstrated that photosynthesis is a light-dependent redox reaction

== O ==
- Kas Oosterhuis, Dutch architect
- Prince Friso of Orange-Nassau, member of the Dutch Royal Family
- Alexander van Oudenaarden, Dutch biophysicist, systems biologist and MIT professor

== P ==
- Maja Pantić, Serbian computer scientist
- Frits Peutz, Dutch architect
- Herman Phaff, Dutch scientist who specialized in yeast ecology
- Frits Philips, Dutch engineer, fourth chairman of the board of directors of Philips
- Gerard Philips, Dutch industrialist, co-founder of Philips
- Roel Pieper, Dutch IT entrepreneur
- Willem van der Poel, Dutch engineer and designer of ZEBRA computer

== R ==
- Herman te Riele, Dutch mathematician, known for disproving Mertens conjecture
- Hendrik van Riessen, Dutch reformational philosophers
- Jacob van Rijs, Dutch architect
- Johan Ringers, Dutch politician
- Jo Ritzen, Dutch economist and social-democratic politician
- Clemens C. J. Roothaan, Dutch theoretical physicist and developer of Roothaan equations
- Jan Roskam, Dutch aerospace engineer
- Mien Ruys, Dutch landscape and garden architect

== S ==
- Diederik Samsom, Dutch politician and member of the House of Representatives of the Netherlands for the Dutch Labour Party
- Steef van Schaik, Dutch politician
- Wim Schermerhorn, Dutch engineer, former Prime Minister of The Netherlands
- Pieter Hendrik Schoute, Dutch mathematician
- Jan Arnoldus Schouten, Dutch mathematician and contributor to tensor calculus
- Egbert Schuurman, Dutch reformational philosopher
- Paul van Son, Dutch manager
- Lars Spuybroek, Dutch architect
- Marcel Stive, Dutch coastal engineer
- Alex Verrijn Stuart, Dutch computer scientist
- Eric de Sturler, Dutch mathematician

== T ==
- Bernard Tellegen, Dutch electrical engineer and developer of pentode and gyrator
- Teuku Mohamad Thaher Thajeb, Indonesian engineer and politician
- Roemer van Toorn, Dutch architect, critic, photographer and professor of architectural theory
- Jan Toorop, Dutch Art Nouveau painter
- Theodoor Philibert Tromp, Dutch politician

== V ==
- Jeroen van der Veer, Dutch engineer, former CEO of Royal Dutch Shell
- Pier Vellinga, Dutch expert on climate change
- Jan Visman, Dutch statistician
- Bas van der Vlies, Dutch politician of the Reformed Political Party
- Hendrik Vos, Dutch politician
- Nathalie de Vries, Dutch architect, co-founder of MVRDV
- Obbe Vermeij, Dutch-Canadian programmer infamous for programming in Grand Theft Auto series

== W ==
- Leen van der Waal, Dutch engineer and former politician
- Franciscus Cornelis Marie Wijffels, Dutch politician
- Adriaan van Wijngaarden, Dutch computer scientist and developer of Van Wijngaarden grammar and co-designer of ALGOL

== Z ==
- Herman Zanstra, Dutch astronomer, known for Zanstra method
- Piet Zwart, Dutch graphic designer, typographer and industrial designer
