= Edwin van der Heide =

Dutch sound artist and composer

- Born: 1970 (age 55–56); Hilversum, Netherlands
- Occupations: Sound artist, composer
- Awards: Ars Electronica Cyberarts 2001 Honorary Mention Interactive Art; Split Film Festival New Media Award 2006; Witteveen+Bos Art+Technology Award 2009; City Sound Artist, City of Bonn, Beethoven Foundation 2015

Edwin van der Heide (born 1970) is a Dutch sound artist and composer known for his immersive installations and performances, currently living in Rotterdam.

== Biography ==
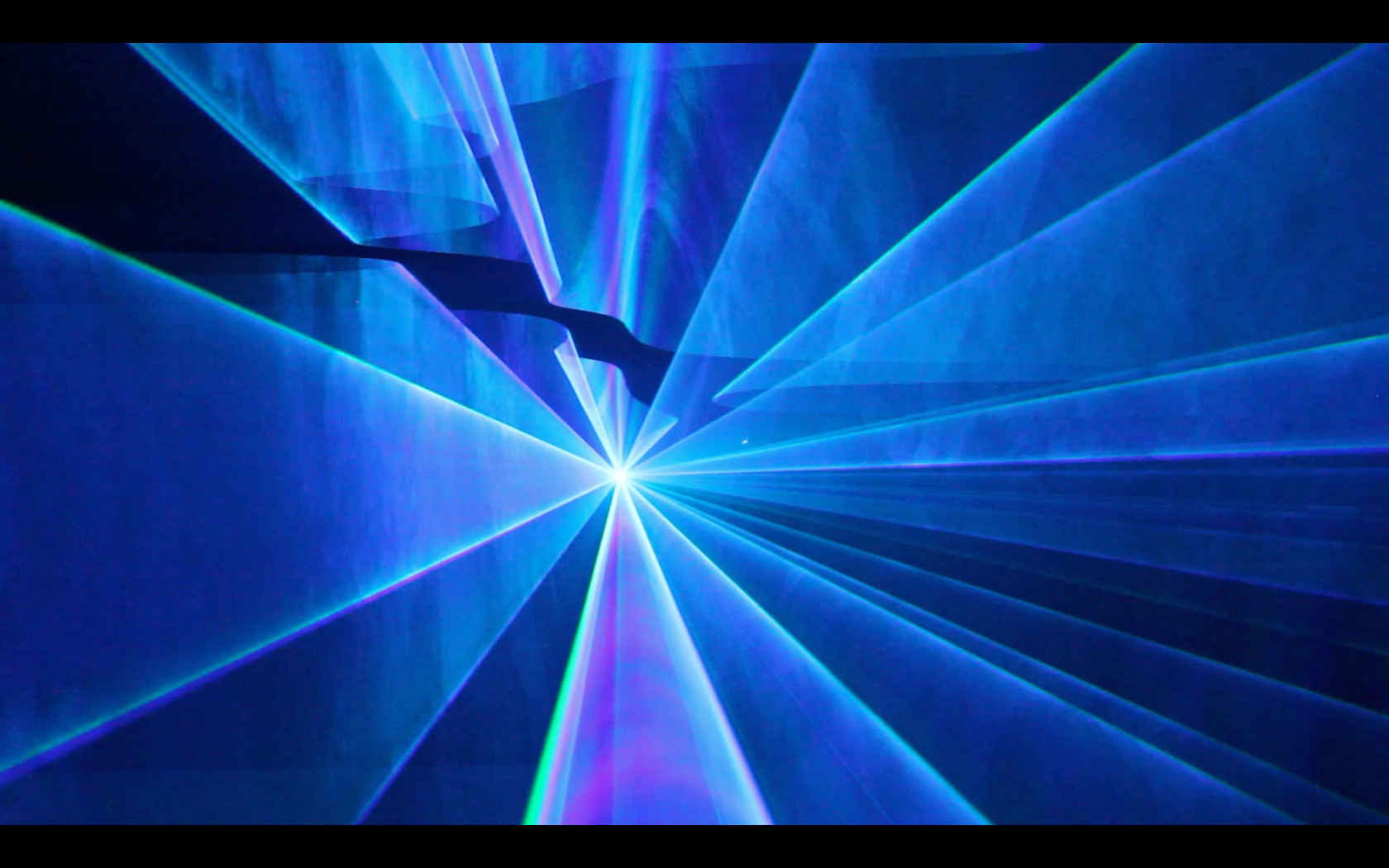
Audiovisual installation by van der Heide

Van der Heide was born in Hilversum, Netherlands, and studied Music Technology in Utrecht and Sonology at the Royal Conservatory of The Hague.

He has developed his academic activity in The Hague, where he was lecturer and later also co-director of the ArtScience Interfaculty of the Royal Conservatory and the Royal Academy of Arts. Currently, in addition to pursuing his artistic career, he is a lecturer and researcher at the Faculty of Science of Leiden University.

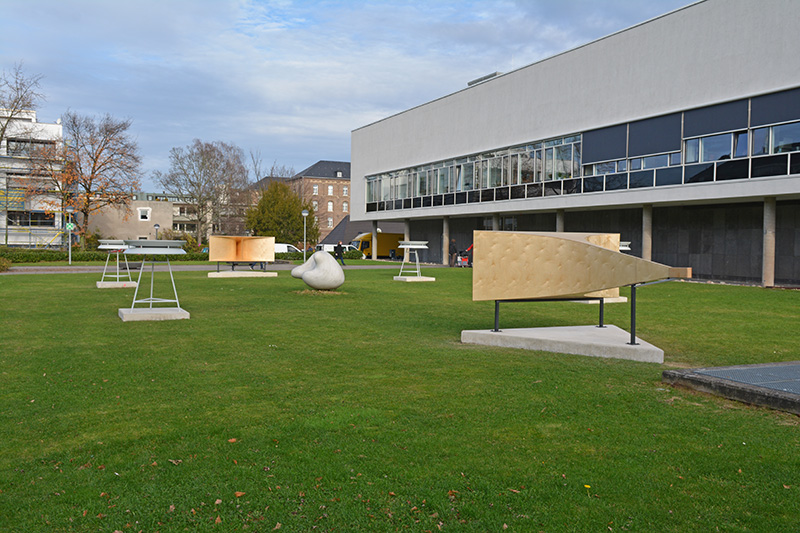
The sound installation Schwingungen - Schwebungen by Edwin van der Heide, University library of Bonn, Germany, 2016

Van der Heide began his artistic career as a composer and performer in the field of electronic music. Along with Zbigniew Karkowski and Atau Tanaka, he was a founding member of Sensorband. From giving stage based performances, he has developed his work in the fields of sound, interactive, and audiovisual installations.

Van der Heide's installations are characterized by the importance of sound, and by the use of other spatial media, such as light (including lasers), real fog or smoke, creating immersive and sensory experiences for the audience.

His work has been presented at the Reina Sofía Museum in Madrid, the MAXXI in Rome, the Stedelijk Museum in Amsterdam, Art Basel in Basel, and the Locarno International Film Festival.

Van der Heide was awarded the Composition Prize of the Beethoven Foundation in Bonn, in 2015. In 2018, he was commissioned to develop the installation CHIASM for the city hall of Barcelona to open and celebrate the 25th edition of Sónar 2018.

== Collaboration with architects ==
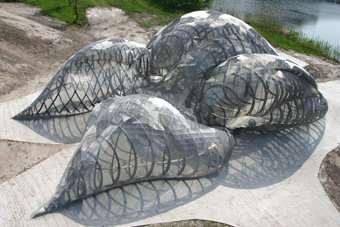
The interactive Son-O-House in Son en Breugel, the Netherlands

Edwin van der Heide collaborated extensively with architects. Together with Victor Wentink, he conceived a generative and interactive sound environment for both the freshwater part by NOX (Lars Spuybroek) and the saltwater part by ONL (Kas Oosterhuis) of the Water Pavilion (1997), part of the Deltapark at the artificial island Neeltje_Jans. The approach was not to have a building with separate content inside but to create a true integration of architecture, sound and light.

In 2004, Lars Spuybroek and Edwin van der Heide realized the interactive architectural sound sculpture Son-O-House. For the exhibition of his installation Pneumatic Sound Field, part of the Synthetic Times exhibition at the National Art Museum of China (NAMOC) in 2008, Lars Spuybroek designed a dedicated pavilion. As part of Sónar 2014, van der Heide realized his composition Spectral Diffractions for the Barcelona Pavilion by Mies van der Rohe.

== Discography ==
- Voltage, Edwin van der Heide & Zbigniew Karkowski, Bake Records 020, Staalplaat, 1999
- Datastream, Edwin van der Heide & Zbigniew Karkowski, ORCDR01, Or Records, 1999
- AREA/PULS, Sensorband (Edwin van der Heide, Zbigniew Karkowski & Atau Tanaka), SONORIS, 2000
- Traceroute, UBSB (Ulf Bilting, Edwin van der Heide, Zbigniew Karkowski & Atau Tanaka), Touch - Ash International, 2000
- Just about Now, V2 label, 2000
- Meltdown of Control, Staalplaat MAV, 2000
- Wavescape, Staalplaat stmcd 025, 2003
- Anthology of Dutch Electronic Music 1999–2010, BASTA, 2011
- Aoyama Noise – Live at Cay, Airplane Label, 2011
- Spectral Diffractions, Fundacio EINA, 2014, ISBN 978-84-617-0298-5
- Pneumatic Sound Field, ALKU, 2014
