= Berlin Marathon =

Annual race in Germany since 1974

- Date: Last weekend of September
- Location: Berlin, Germany
- Event type: Road
- Distance: Marathon
- Primary sponsor: Assicurazioni Generali
- Established: 1974 (52 years ago)
- Course records: Men: 2:01:09 (2022) (Kenya) Eliud Kipchoge; Women: 2:11:04 (2026, Marathon world record progression) (Ethiopia) Tigist Assefa
- Website: Berlin Marathon
- Participants: 54,062 finishers (2024); 43,050 finishers (2023); 34,752 finishers (2022)
- 2026 Berlin Marathon

The Berlin Marathon (German: Berlin-Marathon, pronounced [bɛʁˈliːn ˈmaʁatɔn]) is a marathon event held annually on the streets of Berlin, Germany, on the last weekend of September. Held annually since 1974, (Note: The event was cancelled in 2020 due to the coronavirus pandemic.) the event includes multiple races over the marathon distance of 42.195 kilometres (26.219 mi), including elite level road running competitions for men and women, a race for the public, an inline skating race, a wheelchair race, and a handcycle race.

Events are split over two days, with skaters competing on the marathon course on Saturday before the running events. Power walkers, hand-bikers, wheelchair riders, and a children's marathon (4.2195 kilometres (2.6219 mi), 1/10 of the regular distance) are also part of the marathon weekend, which is organised by SCC EVENTS. The elite running and wheelchair races are part of the World Marathon Majors, an annual series of top level races offering a $1 million prize purse. Generali is the current title sponsor for the race.

The city's flat course regularly produces fast performances: a record eight women scored times below 2:20 in the 2023 race, and a record nine men were below 2:05 and 15 finished inside 2:06. The marathon world record has been broken in Berlin on thirteen occasions. Most recently, Eliud Kipchoge set a new men's world record in 2022 (2:01:09). Tigist Assefa set a new women's world record in 2023 (2:11:53). Since then, both records have been broken at the Chicago Marathon. In the wheelchair race, Catherine Debrunner (Switzerland) 2023 broke the world record in 1:34:16 hours, with two women just one second behind.

== History ==
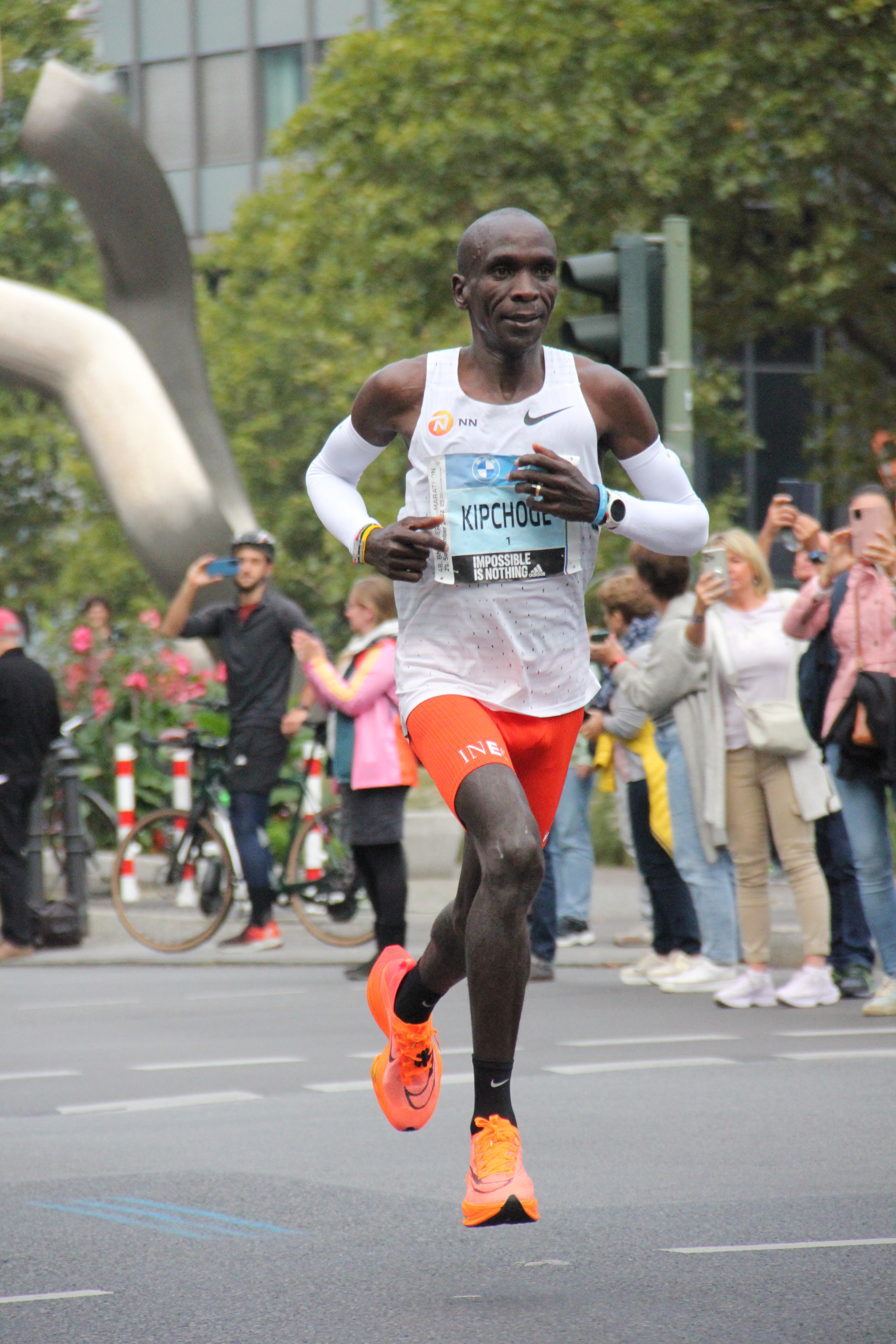
Eliud Kipchoge running world record (2:01:09) at the 2022 Berlin Marathon. His 4th of record 5 wins.

The Berlin Marathon was established in 1974 by Horst Milde, a baker and running enthusiast in the city. The race had 244 finishers; 234 men and 10 women, and was won by Günter Hallas and Jutta von Haase in times of 2:44:53 and 3:22:01 respectively. In 1977, Christa Vahlensieck established a new women's world record at the Berlin Marathon, running 2:34:47. Four years later, the race started outside the Reichstag for the first time, by which time it had grown to 2,583 finishers, making it the largest city road race in Germany. The following year, before German unification, some East Germans secretly ran the race, registering under false names to avoid recriminations from the East German secret service. In 1989, a children's race was added to the event, and eight years later an inline skating marathon was contested.

In 1998, Ronaldo da Costa set a new men's world record, the only South American to hold a marathon world record. Two years later, one of the race's pacemakers, Simon Biwott won the race, after one of the favourites had pulled out in the second half of the race. In 2001, Naoko Takahashi became the first woman to run a sub-2:20 marathon, completing the Berlin Marathon in 2:19:46. The race had continued to be the venue of world records; between 2003 and 2018, seven men's records were set at the race; the most recent remains as the current world record time; Eliud Kipchoge's 2:01:39.

The event was held in mid-September in 2000 and 2018, because of a conflict with the Women's Olympic Marathon, and due to German Unity Day preparations, respectively.

The 2020 edition of the event was prohibited from being held on its originally scheduled dates due to the coronavirus pandemic, and was eventually cancelled once it was clear that it would not be possible to hold it at a later date in 2020. All registrants were given the option of either transferring their entry to 2021 or obtaining a refund.

The 2024 race was the 50th anniversary of the Berlin Marathon. The field size was significantly larger than previous editions of the race, and it set a world record for the most finishers in a marathon. However, that world record was eclipsed by the New York City Marathon two months later.

== Course ==
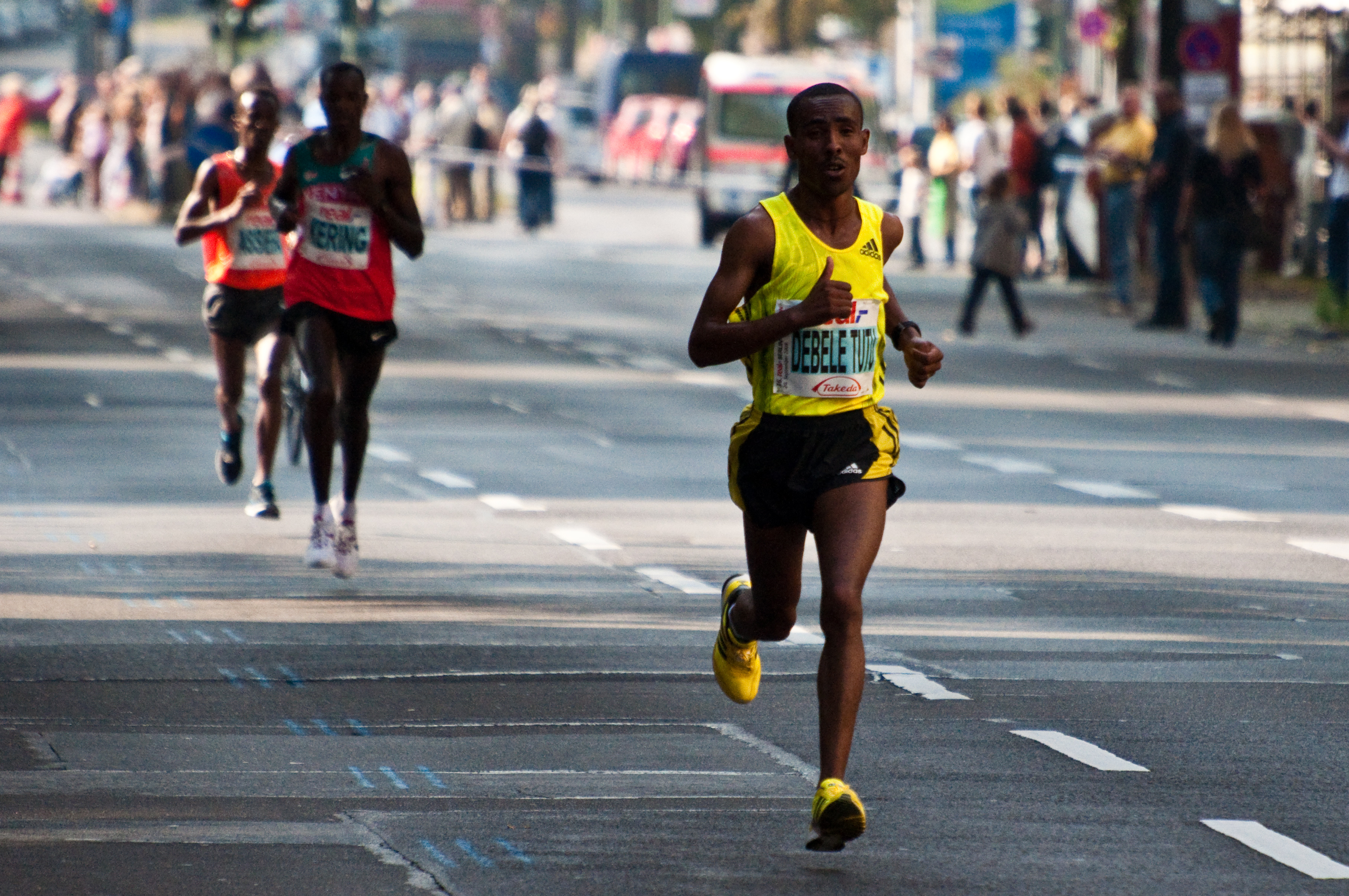
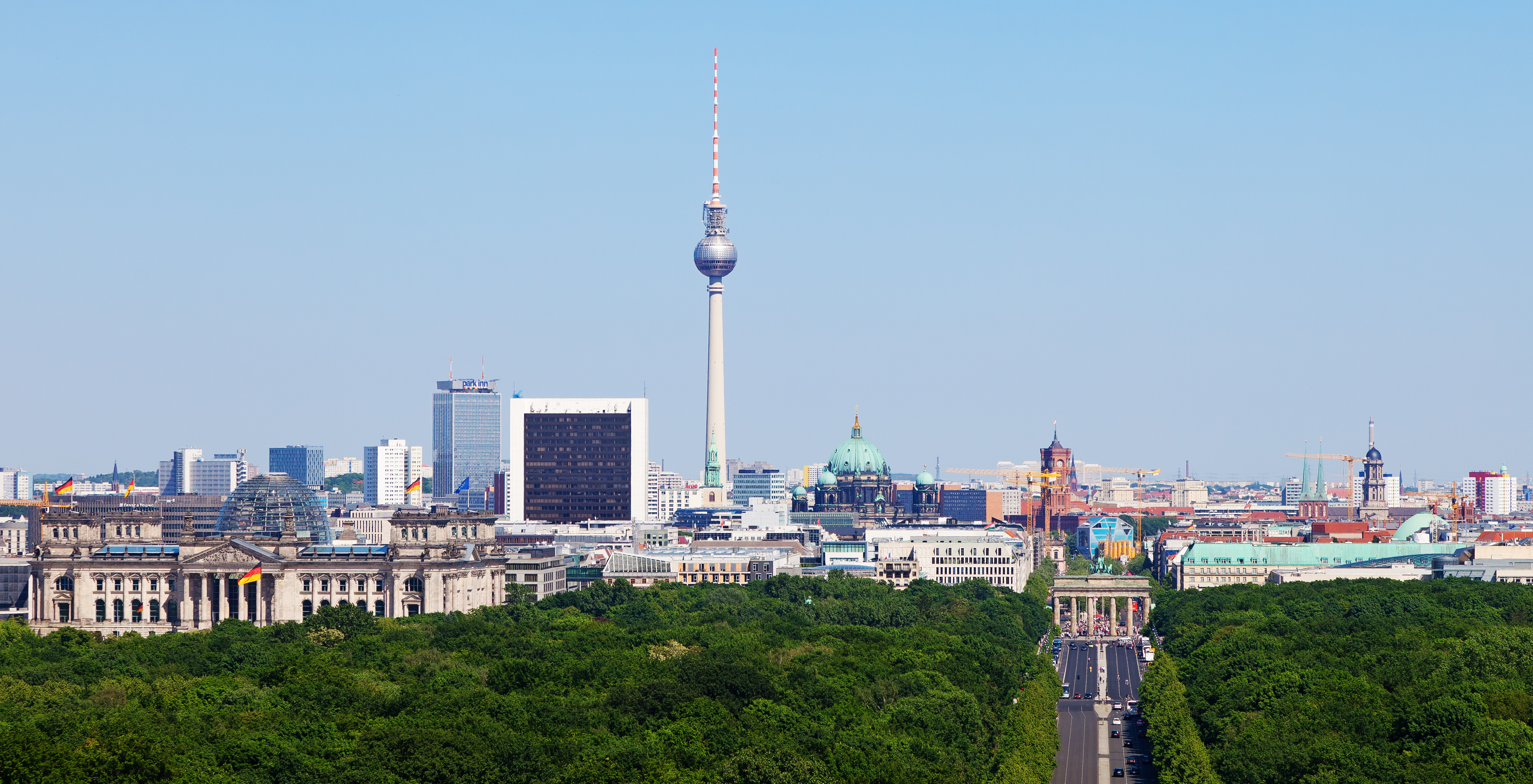
The marathon course is set throughout several boroughs in Berlin with start and finish near the Brandenburg Gate (bottom right).

The course within the metropolis starts and finishes near the Brandenburg Gate. Due to the division of the city, the marathon events before 1990 were limited to West Berlin only. On 30 September 1990, just four days before the German reunification, athletes were able to run through the Brandenburg Gate for the first time and since then, the course has covered both halves of the unified city. It was reported that a great many of the runners had tears in their eyes as they ran through the gate.

Nowadays, after leaving Brandenburg Gate, the course passes Charlottenburg, around Tiergarten, along Moabit and Mitte, and then south to Friedrichshain. After that, it winds west between Kreuzberg and Neukölln, through Schöneberg, over to Friedenau and Zehlendorf, before turning north back toward the city's center. Looping above Schöneberg, the course comes full circle as it finishes through the Gate.

There have been two other major international marathons in Berlin. At the 1936 Olympic Games and at the 2009 IAAF World Championships, both using different routes. A marathon in Berlin on 14 Oct 1973 was won by Ulrich Hutmacher (GER) with a time of 2:19:32, but that race is not considered to be part of the Berlin Marathon series.

== Sponsors ==
There have been several title sponsors in the race's history. From 1974 until 1989 it was just the Berlin Marathon. In 1990, it was the Yanase Berlin Marathon. In 1991 and 1992 it was the Canon Berlin Marathon. It reverted to simply the Berlin Marathon from 1993 until 1997. It then became the Alberto Berlin Marathon in 1998 and 1999. A new title sponsor changed the name to the real,- Berlin Marathon from 2000 to 2010. From 2011 to 2026 it has been called the BMW Berlin Marathon. Starting from 2027, the title sponsor is changed to Generali.

== Finishers ==
In terms of finishing athletes, Berlin is one of five worldwide marathons with more than 50,000 finishers, along with the New York City Marathon, Chicago Marathon, London Marathon and Paris Marathon.

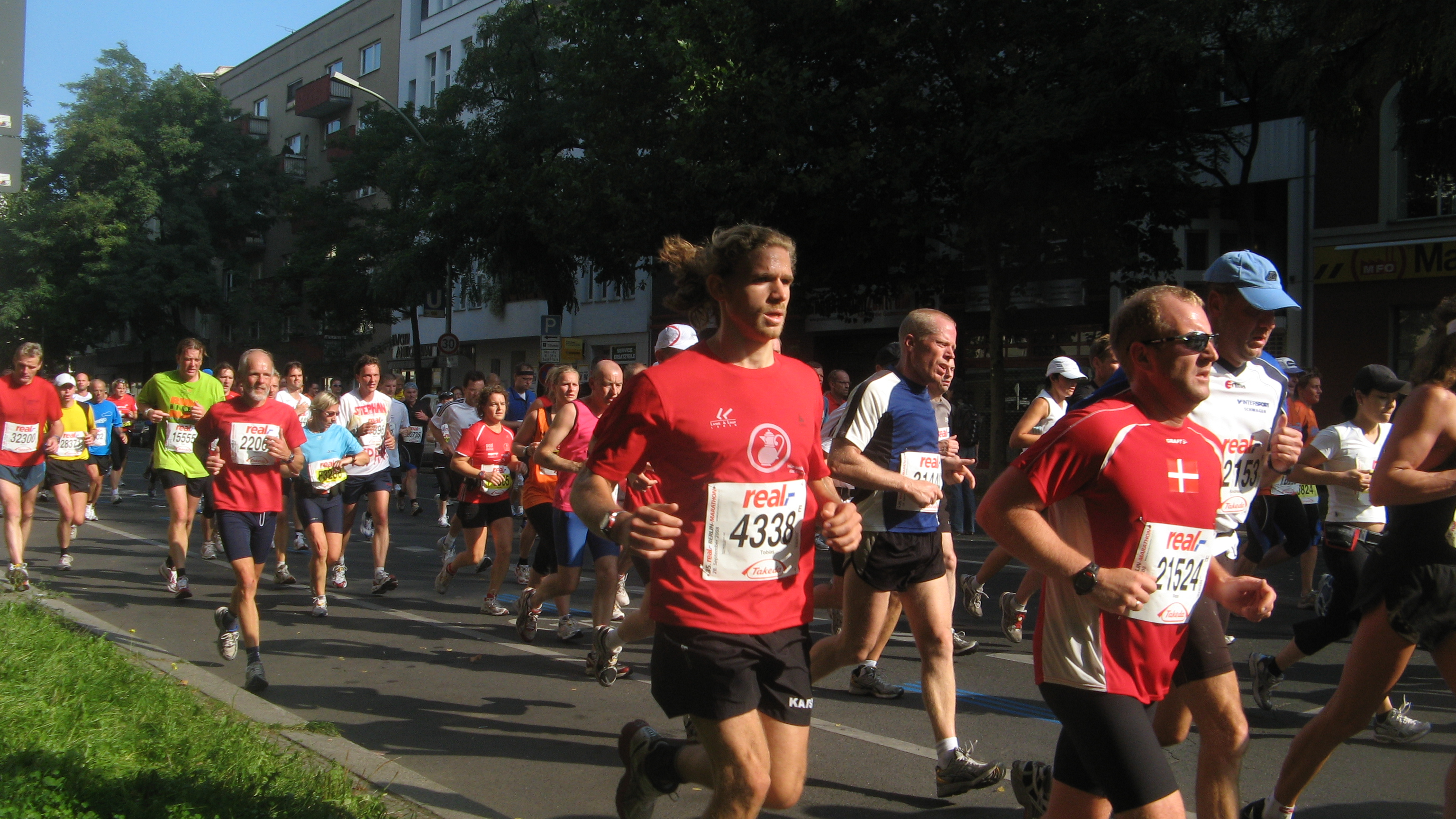
2009 Berlin Marathon

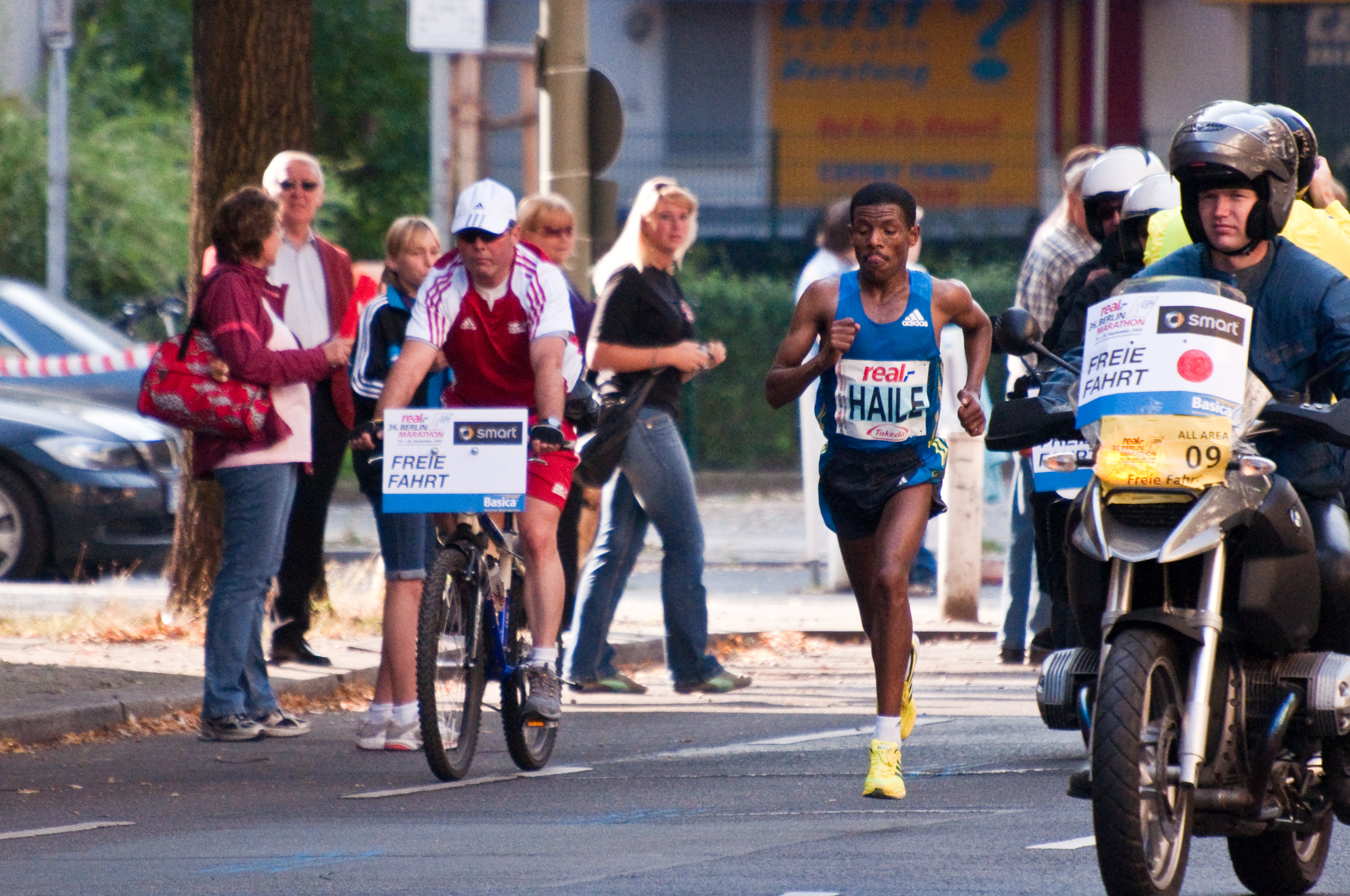
World record winner Haile Gebrselassie on his way to his fourth straight victory in the 2009 Berlin Marathon

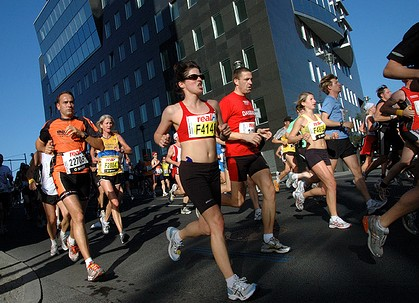
The Berlin Marathon is known as a flat and fast course.

Year	Finishers				Shares	
Year	Total	Males	Females	X	Males	Females
2025	48,359	31,070	17,232	57	64%	36%
2024	54,062	35,475	18,528	59	66%	34%
2023	43,050	28,608	14,405	37	66%	33%
2022	34,752	23,246	11,499	7	67%	33%
2021	23,103	16,739	6,364	-	72%	28%
2020	cancelled due to COVID-19 pandemic					
2019	43,990	30,748	13,242	-	70%	30%
2018	40,775	28,443	12,332	-	70%	30%
2017	39,101	28,067	11,034	-	72%	28%
2016	36,054	26,807	9,247	-	74%	26%
2015	36,767	27,917	8,929	-	76%	24%
2014	28,946	22,178	6,768	-	77%	23%
2013	36,527	27,577	8,990	-	75%	25%
2012	34,377	26,398	7,871	-	77%	23%
2011	32,977	25,577	7,414	-	77%	23%
2010	34,070	26,410	7,215	-	78%	22%
2009	35,016	27,934	7,060	-	79%	21%
2008	35,653	28,357	7,429	-	79%	21%
2007	32,497	25,994	6,492	-	80%	20%
2006	30,190	24,094	6,088	-	80%	20%
2005	30,382	24,501	5,872	-	81%	19%
2004	28,023	22,800	5,222	-	81%	19%
2003	30,709	25,108	5,601	-	82%	18%
2002	25,286	20,880	4,406	-	83%	17%
2001	25,792	21,669	4,123	-	84%	16%
2000	22,879	19,332	3,547	-	84%	16%
1999	19,129	16,537	2,592	-	87%	13%
1998	21,004	17,795	3,209	-	85%	15%
1997	14,982	13,120	1,862	-	88%	12%
1996	16,529	14,489	2,040	-	88%	12%
1995	13,088	11,682	1,406	-	89%	11%
1994	12,263	10,980	1,283	-	90%	10%
1993	14,107	12,586	1,521	-	89%	11%
1992	13,225	11,918	1,307	-	90%	10%
1991	14,849	13,456	1,393	-	91%	9%
1990	22,806	20,415	2,391	-	90%	10%
1989	13,433	12,233	1,200	-	91%	9%
1988	13,117	11,986	1,131	-	91%	9%
1987	12,674	11,651	1,023	-	92%	8%
1986	11,450	10,574	876	-	92%	8%
1985	9,810	9,146	664	-	93%	7%
1984	7,297	6,875	422	-	94%	6%
1983	5,121	4,886	235	-	95%	5%
1982	3,448	3,318	130	-	96%	4%
1981	2,567	2,418	149	-	94%	6%
1980	294	276	18	-	94%	6%
1979	222	207	15	-	93%	7%
1978	197	187	10	-	95%	5%
1977	230	219	11	-	95%	5%
1976	311	296	15	-	95%	5%
1975	236	232	4	-	98%	2%
1974	244	234	10	-	96%	4%

== Inline skating race ==
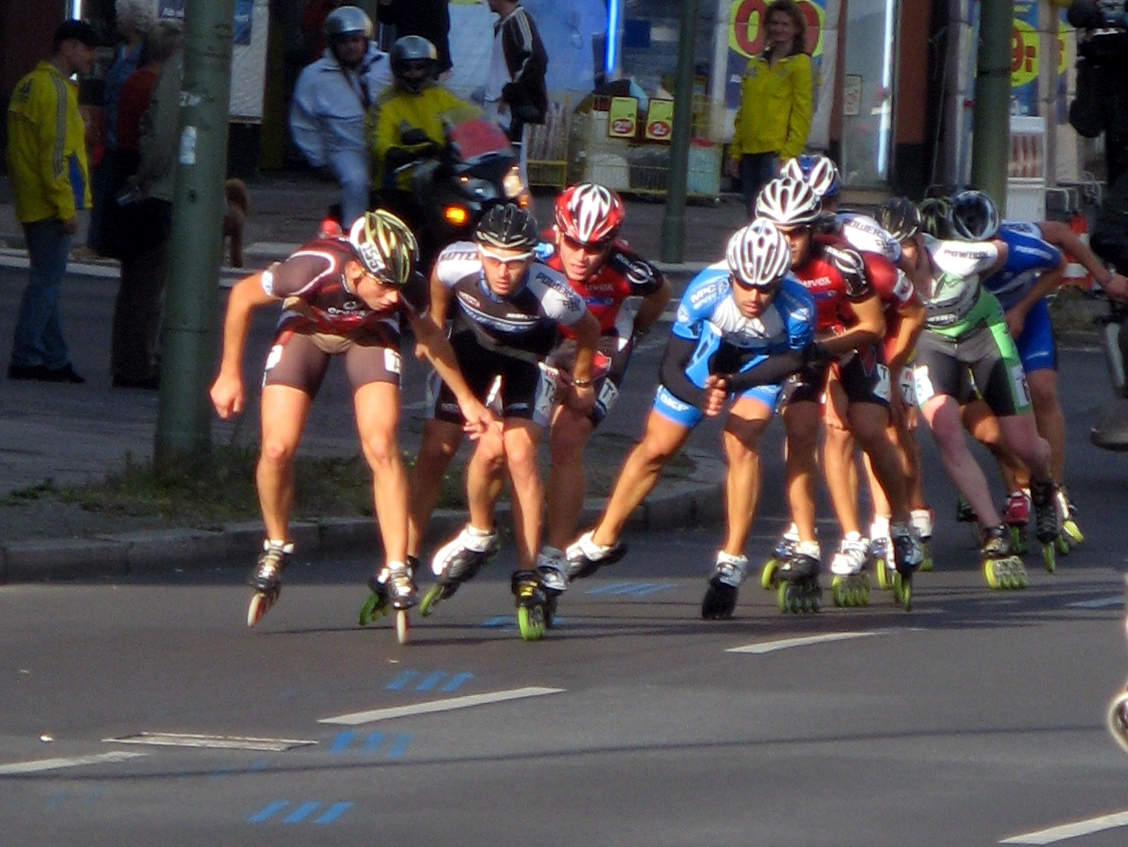
The skater marathon is considered to be largest inline marathon in the world.

An inline skating section was added to the marathon event in 1997. A total of 5081 people took part in this section in the 2019 race. It is considered the largest inline skater marathon in the world and is the final venue of the World Inline Cup. The men's and women's race records are held by Bart Swings (56:45 in 2022) and Maira Yaqueline Arias (1:06:35 in 2017).

== Handcycle race ==
A handcycle race was first held at the race in 2004. In 2008, 166 handcyclists participated in the Berlin Marathon. The men's and women's race records are held by Joseph Fritsch (57:53 in 2025) and Christiane Reppe (1:08:54 in 2016).

== Wheelchair race ==
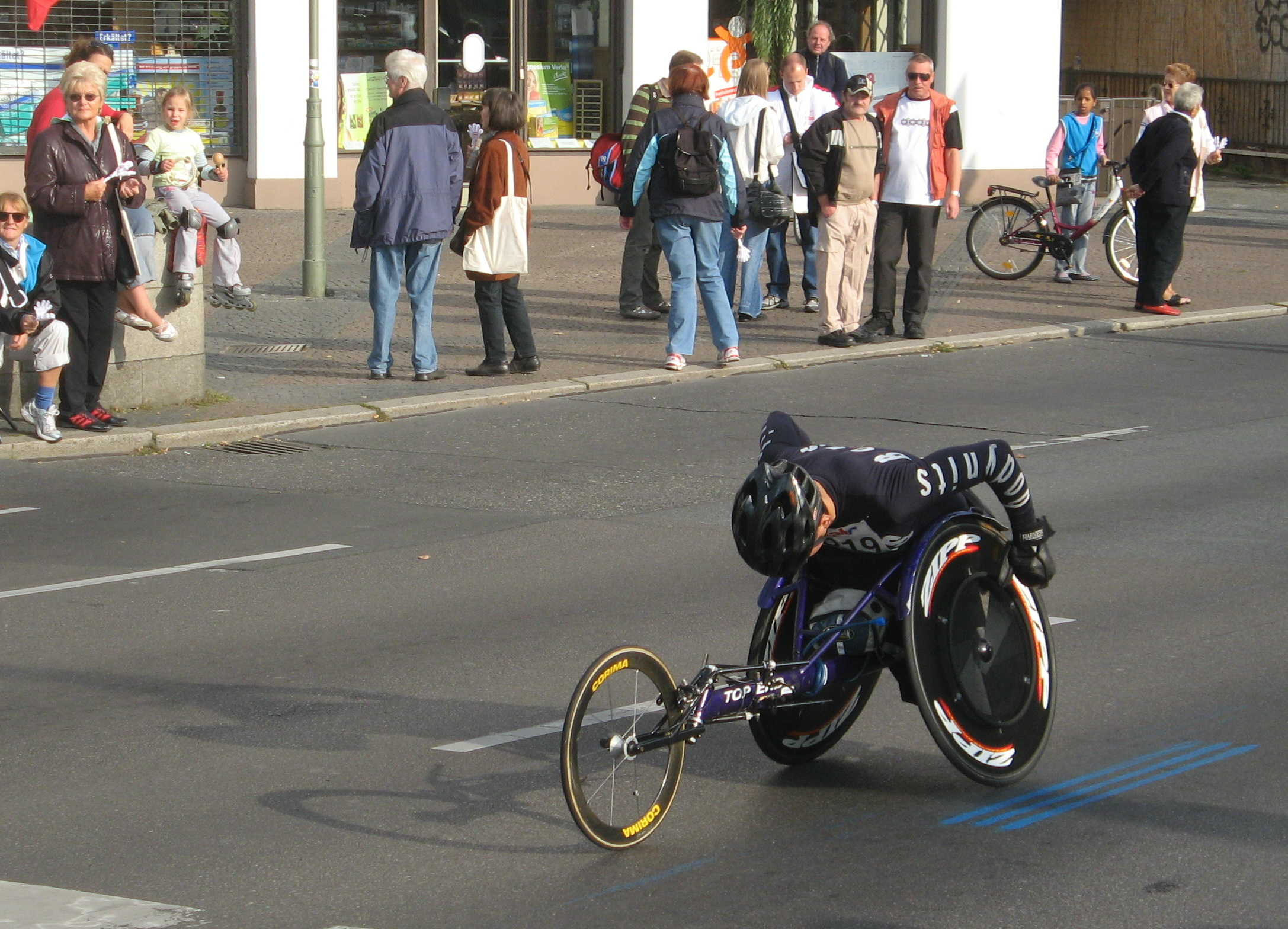
Wheelchair athlete in 2009

A wheelchair section was first officially held at the Berlin Marathon in 1981. Only men competed that year. The wheelchair race typically starts earlier in the day before the runners and power walkers.

Heinz Frei is the most successful athlete, with twenty wins in the men's race. The next most successful athlete is Manuela Schär, who has won the women's race six times. Both these athletes also hold the records for time, with Frei setting the men's race record of 1:21:39 in 1997 and Schär setting the women's race record of 1:36:53 in 2018.

== See also ==
- List of marathon races in Europe
- Sport in Berlin
