= NSX =

NSX may refer to:

== Stock exchanges ==
- Namibian Stock Exchange (NSX)
- National Stock Exchange (Jersey City, New Jersey), US (NSX)
- National Stock Exchange of Australia (NSX)

== Other uses ==
- Honda NSX (New Sportscar eXperimental/eXperience), an automobile distributed as Acura NSX in North America
- Post Office Sorting Van (NSX), a British rail vehicle
- VMware NSX, a network virtualization product
- Narrow Shape Cross-Section Blade (NSX), an ice-skating blade designed by Diederik Hol
