= Dual Box =

Roller skate component

Dual Box or DualBox is the name for the tubular sidewall inline skating frame, which employs the mechanical properties of the tubular to optimize the performance of a frame or chassis that secures the wheels on an inline skate (a critical component of high performance skates).

Designed in 1999 by Dutch Design Engineer Diederik Hol at Mogema, the Dual Box design was devised to optimize the elastic properties of inline skate frames (which the skater interprets as stiffness and feel, and contribute greatly to ride quality and power transmission) via the properties of the tubular sidewalls to enhance rigidity.

The Dual Box design successfully eliminates the need for horizontal cross-bracing in inline skate frames, and provided progressive flexural feel for the skater rather than the isolated areas of varying stiffness which were inherent to many, more traditional double-void extrusion frames.

Through a product partnership with the Mogema company, the Rollerblade professional racing team debuted the Dual Box frame to the world in 2001 after which time team athletes rode Dual Box frames across the finish line first in numerous Swiss Inline Cup, World Inline Cup and World Championship events. During this time the Dual Box became one of the most recognized and successful frame designs in speed skating, with 45 athletes winning their Gold, Silver and bronze medals at the 2001 World Speed Skating Championship on the frames.

Since 2003, the Rollerblade company has produced Dual Box frames under licence from Mogema and has specified Dual Box technology in their high-performance skate product lines. Today, following the dissolution of Mogema in 2006, Dual Box designer Diederik Hol's own company CadoMotus produces its own skating frames based on an evolution of the Dual Box tubular sidewall.
