= Kas Oosterhuis =

Dutch architect

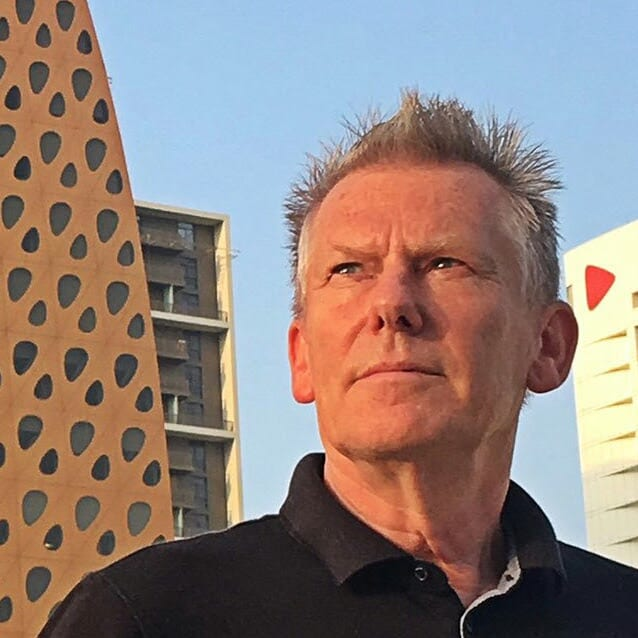
- Kas Oosterhuis, MSc architect
- Born: 1951 (age 74–75); Amersfoort, Netherlands
- Known for: Architecture
- Movement: Nonstandard Architecture, Interactive Architecture, Planetary Architecture
- Awards: Dutch Design Prize, National Steel Prize, Funda Award, Proholz Prize, Business Week/Architectural Record Award, Zeeuwse Architectuurprijs, OCÉBNA Prize for Industrial Architecture

Kas Oosterhuis (1951) is a Dutch architect and professor who co-founded the innovation studio ONL with visual artist Ilona Lénárd. He was a professor at Delft University of Technology (TU Delft) and later at Qatar University. His office, ONL, has realized a number of contemporary architecture projects including the Salt Water Pavilion at Neeltje Jans, the Web of North Holland at the 2002 World Expo in Haarlemmermeer, the A2 Cockpit in the Sounder Barrier at Leidsche Rijn, Utrecht and the Liwa Tower in Abu Dhabi.

== Biography ==
Oosterhuis studied architecture at Delft University of Technology from 1970 to 1979, under Rem Koolhaas. In 1991, he completed his first housing project, the Patiowoningen at the Dedemsvaartweg, and an urban design scheme by OMA. From the beginning of their practice, Oosterhuis worked closely with visual artist Ilona Lénárd.

In 2000, Oosterhuis accepted a professorship at the Faculty of Architecture at the TU Delft. From September 2017 to June 2019, Kas Oosterhuis held a professorship at Qatar University in Doha; from September 2022 to August 2023, a full professorship at INDA Chulalongkorn University.

== Fusion of Art and Architecture on a digital platform ==
Oosterhuis has used a digital approach to architecture, from the earliest design stages up to the computer numerical controlled production of the building components, of which process the A2 Cockpit in the Sound Barrier is an example. Oosterhuis has won and subsequently built two international competitions: the Bálna Budapest and the LIWA tower in Abu Dhabi.

Between 1988 and 1989, Kas Oosterhuis and Ilona Lénárd lived and worked for one year in the Van Doesburg studio-house in Meudon near Paris. In that year, they decided to bring their art and architecture work together in a joint practice, under the motto of “The Fusion of Art and Architecture on a Digital Platform”. In their early years of coöperation they organized the events Artificial Intuition (1990, Gallery Aedes, Berlin), The Synthetic Dimension (1991, De Zonnehof Amersfoort), Sculpture City (1994, Ram Gallery Rotterdam), and realized 20 public art and architectural projects: the inflatable weblounge ParaSITE (1996, Rotterdam Festivals), the Musicsculpture in Oldemarkt (1998), the TT Monument in Assen (2002), housing projects Patio Housing The Hague (1991, Dedemsvaartweg) and De Kassen (1991, Kattenbroek Amersfoort), where Ilona Lénárd mapped colorful dazzle paintings on the entire facade, the housing project Dancing Facades (1992) in De Hunze in Groningen, the Waterpavilion (1997) at Neeltje Jans, featuring the complex Hydra structure on the basis of an intuitive 3d computer sketch, and later the housing project Fside (2007) in Amsterdam. Kas Oosterhuis realized the Liwa Tower in the Capital Center district in Abu Dhabi in 2014.

== Publications ==
Oosterhuis has written or edited 16 books explaining his view on digital architecture, including Programmable Architecture, Architecture Goes Wild, Hyperbodies, towards an Emotive Architecture, ONLogic, Speed and Vision, and Towards A New Kind of Building, a designer's guide to nonstandard architecture. Oosterhuis previously organized a series of Game Set and Match conferences at the TU Delft (GSM I in 2002, GSM II in 2006, GSM III in 2016), and GSM4Q at Qatar University in 2019. Kas Oosterhuis was editor in chief of the Game Set and Match books, edited the book Hyperbody, First Decade of Interactive Architecture, and edited the book series Interactive Architecture.

== Awards ==
- 1996 National Steel Prize honorable mention [Garbagetransferstation Elhorst/ Vloedbelt]
- 1996 OCÉBNA Prize for industrial architecture [Garbagetransferstation Elhorst/ Vloedbelt]
- 1998 Zeeuwse Architectuurprijs [Saltwaterpavilion]
- 1998 Business Week / Architectural Record Award [Garbage transfer station Elhorst/ Vloedbelt]
- 2005 Proholz Prize, Austria [Schmetterling Wingman]
- 2006 Funda Award [Hessing Cockpit in Acoustic Barrier]
- 2007 National Steel Prize [Cockpit in Acoustic Barrier]
- 2007 Dutch Design Prize [Cockpit in Acoustic Barrier]

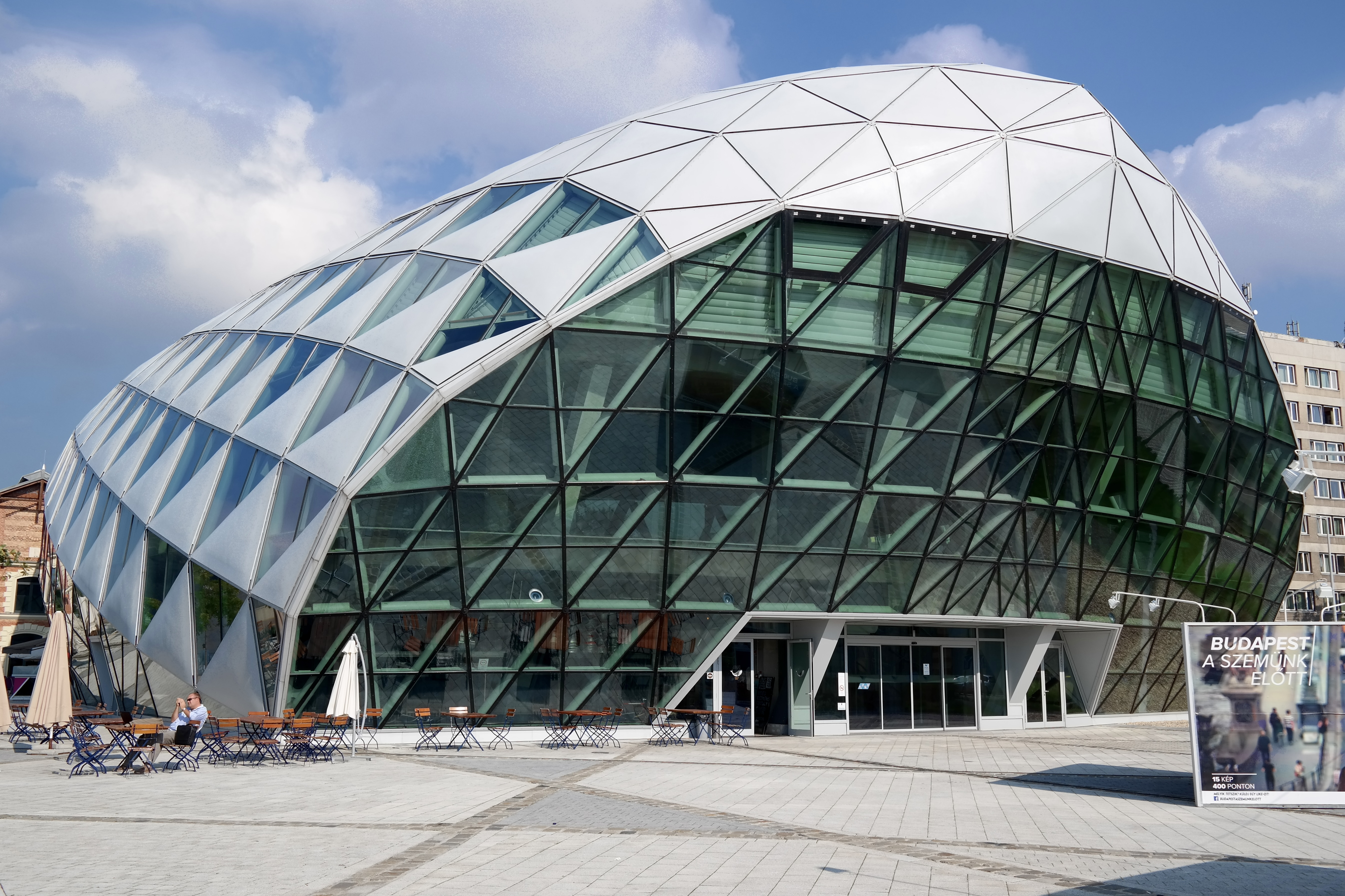
CET building, Budapest
