= Mogema =

Registered brand trademark owned by Sportsinline International

Sportsinline International BV Office in 't Harde, Netherlands 2004

Mogema is a registered brand trademark owned by Sportsinline International BV (Est. 1999), a Dutch company that specialized in the design and production of inline- and ice speedskating products. Sportsinline International was founded by the parent company of the Mogema group to design and produce speedskating products under the Mogema name. The company approached Design Engineer Diederik Hol to design a whole range of ice and inline speedskates that evolved under Hol's direction into Mogema's modern product line.

The 't Harde-based Mogema metalworking group in the Netherlands was the first to commercially produce an inline speedskating frame after two employees – both speedskaters – began using company technologies in their own time to produce a specialized speedskating frame in 1985. The frame they produced for themselves was quickly in demand among their friends and fellow speedskaters and production soon expanded. An agreement was reached soon after for Mogema metalworking to produce quantities of the frame for sale by the Stouwdam skate shop in nearby Oldebroek.

The Mogema-branded frames were produced from extruded aluminium alloy and were soon sold around the world; becoming the must-have item for the world's elite roller speed skaters, who in 1992 had opened the World Speed Rollerskating Championships to inline skates for the first time. The frame design underwent a number of evolutions and eventually became the Mogema Diamond Series frame that for years was the most-prevalent inline speedskating frame in the world.

Mogema was a technological innovator in speedskating sports products – the most commercially successful being the Dual Box inline skating frames, a patented design developed by Diederik Hol while working at Mogema.

Late in 2006, lead designer Diederik Hol left Mogema to start his own skating company CadoMotus. Although some inaccurate reports indicated Mogema itself was changing its name, the owners of Sportsinline International made the decision to dissolve the company at the end of that year. Hol established his own brand in 2007, together with Henk Schra (then owner of Stouwdam skate shop), producing a CadoMotus-branded frame using the Dual Box technology – the patent for which he had licensed from Sportsinline's owners.
