= Zbigniew Karkowski =

Polish experimental musician and composer

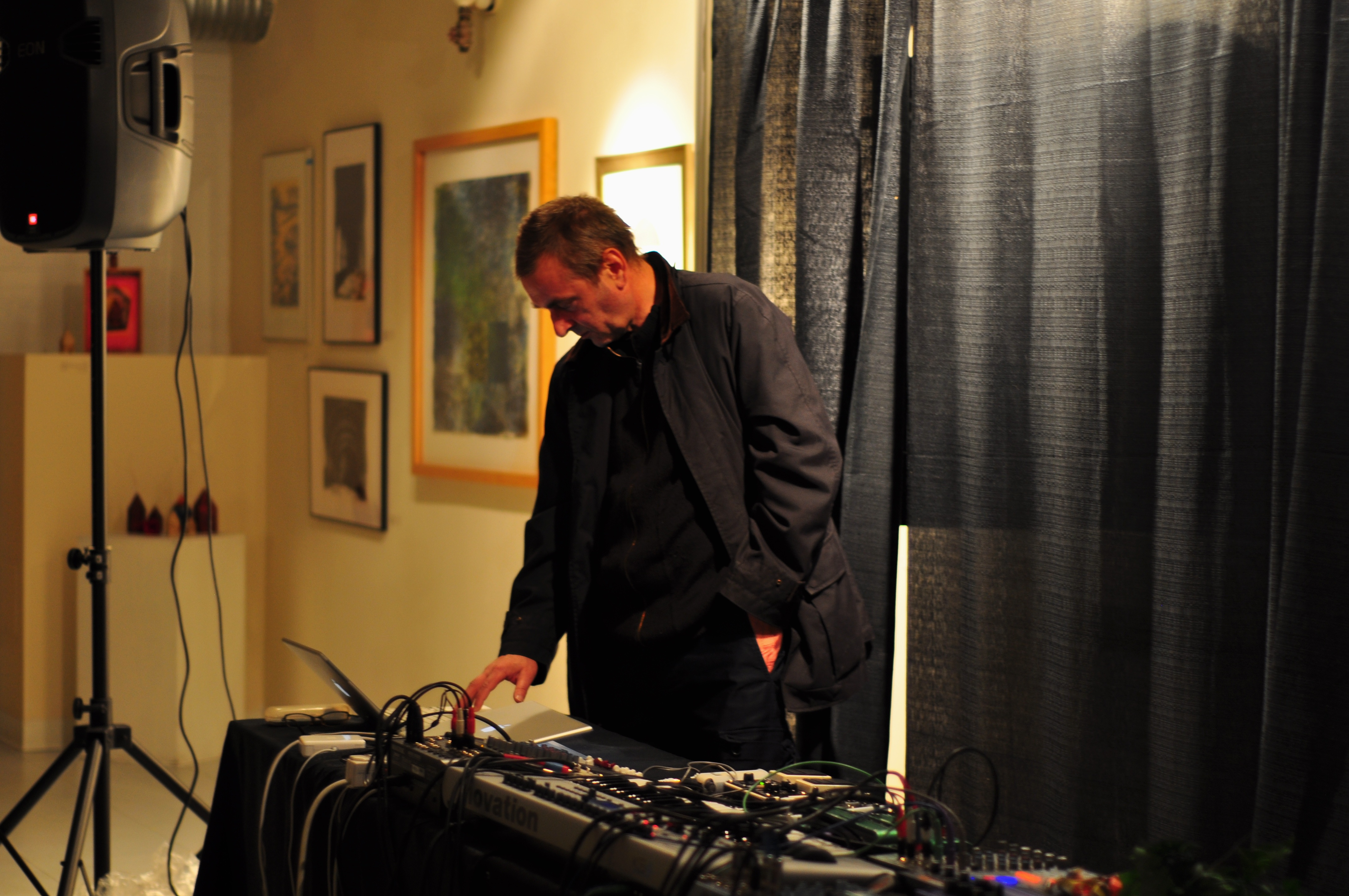
- Karkowski performing in Silver Spring, Maryland in February 2010

Background information
- Birth name: Zbigniew Karkowski
- Born: 14 March 1958; Kraków, Poland
- Died: 12 December 2013 (aged 55); Peru
- Genres: Noise, Experimental
- Occupation(s): Musician, Producer
- Formerly of: Cosmic Trigger, Le Dépeupleur, MAZK, Pop (Product Of Power), Sensorband, Senssurround Orchestra, UBSB

Zbigniew Karkowski (14 March 1958 – 12 December 2013) was a Polish experimental musician and composer.

== Biography ==
Karkowski was born on 14 March 1958 in Kraków, Poland. He studied composition at the State College of Music in Gothenburg, Sweden, aesthetics of modern music at the University of Gothenburg's Department of Musicology, and computer music at the Chalmers University of Technology. After completing his studies in Sweden, he studied sonology for a year at the Royal Conservatory of Music in The Hague, Netherlands. During his education, he also attended many summer composition master courses arranged by Centre Acanthes in Avignon and Aix-en-Provence, France, studying with Iannis Xenakis, Olivier Messiaen, Pierre Boulez and Georges Aperghis, among others.

He worked actively as a composer of both acoustic and electroacoustic music. He wrote pieces for large orchestra (commissioned and performed by the Gothenburg Symphony Orchestra), plus an opera and several chamber music pieces that were performed by professional ensembles in Sweden, Poland, Switzerland and Germany.

Along with Edwin van der Heide and Atau Tanaka, he was a founding member of "Sensorband." In performances by this electroacoustic music performance trio, Karkowski "activated his instrument by the movement of his arms in the space around him; this cut through invisible infrared beams mounted on a scaffolding structure" (Tanaka 2012).

Karkowski lived and worked in Tokyo, Japan, for the last years of his life and was active in the underground noise scene there.

Karkowski died of pancreatic cancer on 12 December 2013 in Peru.

== Discography ==
- Bad Bye Engine (Radium 226.05 1988)
- Uexkull (Anckarström 1991)
- Phauss / Karkowski / Bilting (Silent 1992)
- Disruptor (OR 1998)
- World as Will (Staalplaat 1998)
- Mutation (ERS 1999)
- Choice of Points for the Application of Force (Ytterbium 2000)
- It (Mego 2000)
- Le Depeupleur, with Kasper T. Toeplitz (Cross Fade Enter Tainment (CFET) 2000)
- Reverse Direction and Let the Sound Reach out to You (Firework Edition Records 2000)
- Whint (.Absolute. 2000), with Francisco López
- Function Generator, with Xopher Davidson (Sirr 2001)
- Consciously Unconscious Unconsciously Conscious (Metamkine 2002)
- World as Will II (23five 2002)
- ElectroStatics (Post Concrete 2003)
- Turnoff (Noise Asia 2003)
- Attuning / Attending (Musica Genera 2004)
- Intensifier (walnut + locust 2004)
- KHZ, with Antimatter (Auscultare Research 2005)
- One and Many (Sub Rosa 2005)
- Live at Waterland Kwanyin (Kwan Yin Records 2006)
- Continuity (Asphodel 2007)
- Divide by Zero, with Antimatter [Xopher Davidson] (Antifrost 2007)
- Difficulty of Being, with Brian O'Reilly (Monotype Records 2014)
- Encumbrance, performed by Gęba, Constantin Popp, and Wolfram (Bôłt Records/Turning Sounds 2019)

== Bibliography ==
- Karkowski, Zbigniew. Physiques sonores. Paris: Van Dieren, 2008.

== Sources ==
- Tanaka, Atau. "[Gallery] Atau Tanaka." eContact! 14.2 — Biotechnological Performance Practice / Pratiques de performance biotechnologique (July 2012). Montréal: CEC.
