= Deltapark Neeltje Jans =

Theme park in the Netherlands

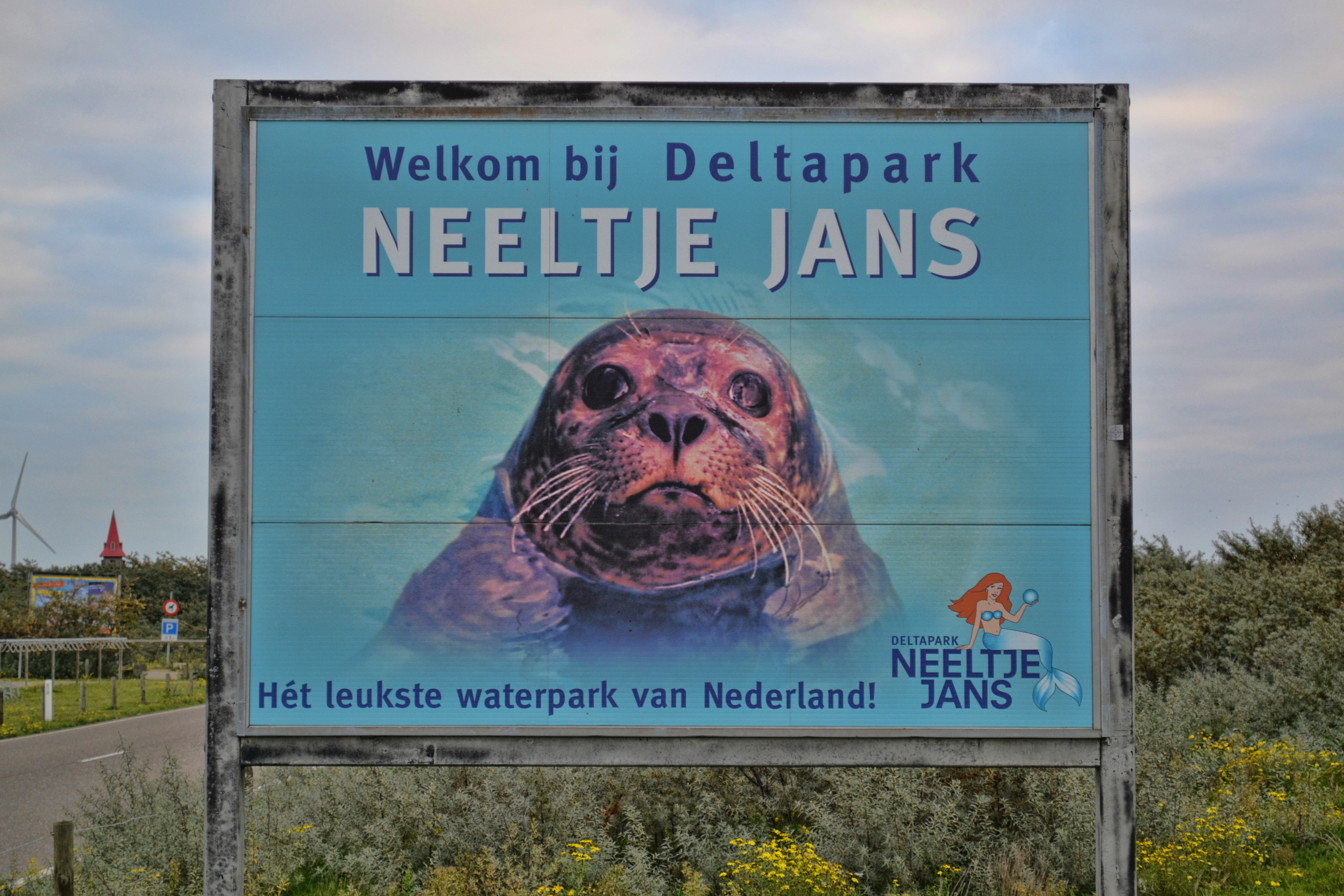
- Interactive map of Deltapark Neeltje Jans
- Coordinates: 51.63907°N 3.71146°E
- Status: Operating
- Opened: 2009
- Theme: Water and Education

Attractions
- Total: 6
- Water rides: 1
- Shows: 2

Deltapark Neeltje Jans is a Dutch theme park located on the former artificial island Neeltje Jans at the Oosterschelde. In addition to the attractive nature of the Deltapark Neeltje Jans, it also plays an educational role with respect to the Delta Works.

== History ==
Deltapark Neeltje Jans was created out of a public information center which, at the initiative of Rijkswaterstaat, was set up in 1986 during the construction of the Oosterschelde barrier in 1979 . During this period the center has been visited by hundreds of thousands from the Netherlands and abroad . During the construction of the Oosterschelde barrier the center was continuously expanded with information about the current state of the construction of the Oosterschelde barrier .

=== Delta-Expo ===
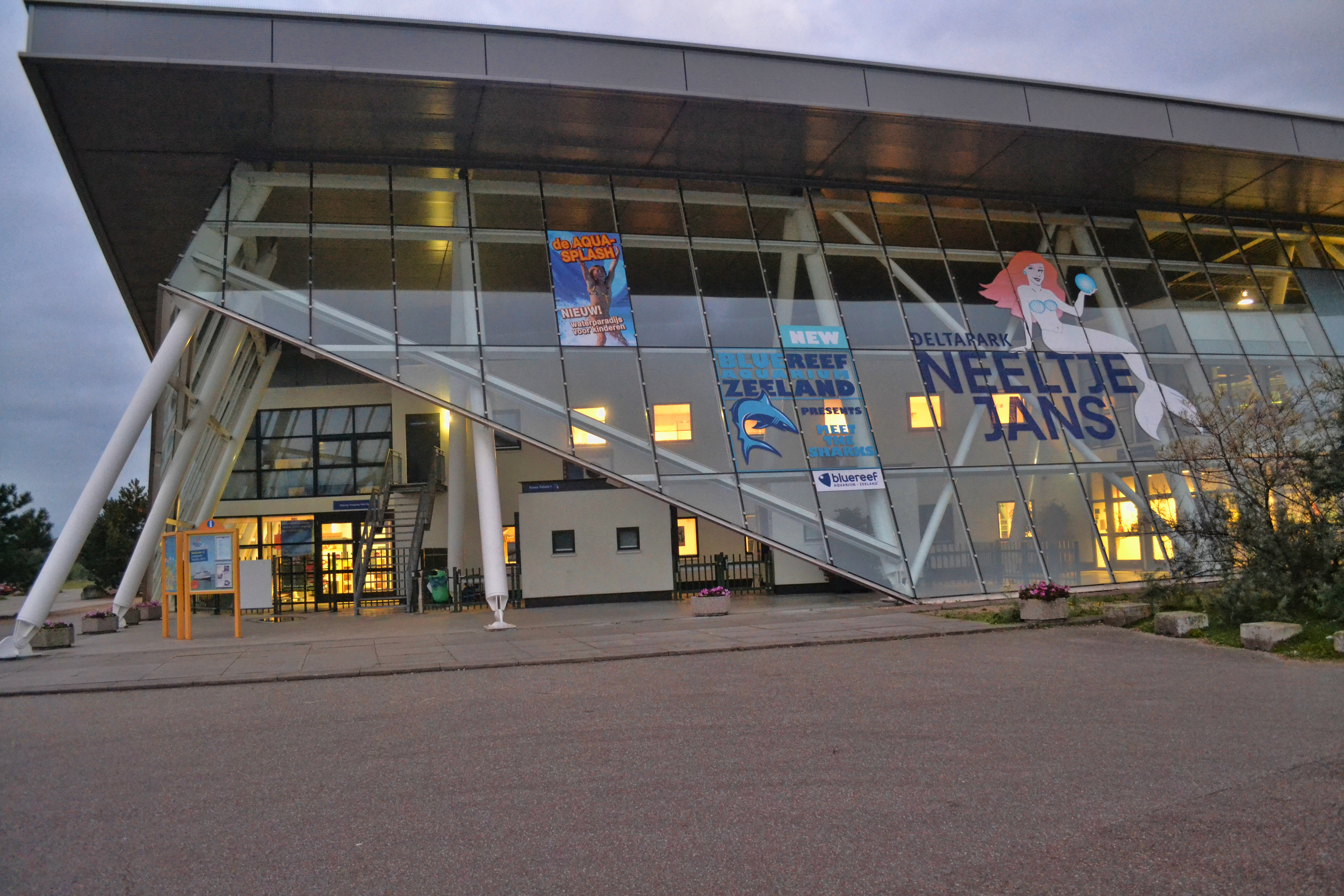
Main entrance building, Deltapark Neeltje Jans

With the opening of the Oosterschelde barrier, by Queen Beatrix on October 4, 1986, the information center will be permanent and continues under the name "Delta Expo" in the control building of the Oosterschelde barrier. Besides the technically interested, the center was increasingly frequented by local residents and day trippers. This trend also led to the decision to offer a more attractive character in addition to an educational value.

=== Waterland Neeltje Jans ===
The Delta Expo, which was run until 1997 by a foundation, became independent. The name was changed to Waterland Neeltje Jans. Various attractions on the theme of Delta Works, marine animals and water activities were added to the offerings.

=== Deltaplaza ===
On August 19, 2002, a raging fire destroyed the reception building at the Delta Pavilion. The park remained open with the use of temporary buildings and construction started immediately on a new multifunctional building to be called the "Delta Plaza". By the building is already partly in use. Various exhibits that were housed in the Delta Expo, along with a coffee corner and offices, were housed in the Delta Plaza by the end of 2003. From 2003 to 2005, the inner area of Neeltle Jans was transformed into a bay where all the activities of Water Land Neeltje Jans were concentrated.

=== Deltapark Neeltje Jans ===
In 2007, the name of the theme park was changed to Deltapark Neeltje Jans. Whereas the name WaterLand Neeltje Jans was associated by the public to the attractions especially, Deltapark Neeltje Jans would convey a more neutral character, with equally good emphasis on the intrinsic aspects. In August 2008 the park was acquired by the Spanish company Aspro.

== Attractions ==
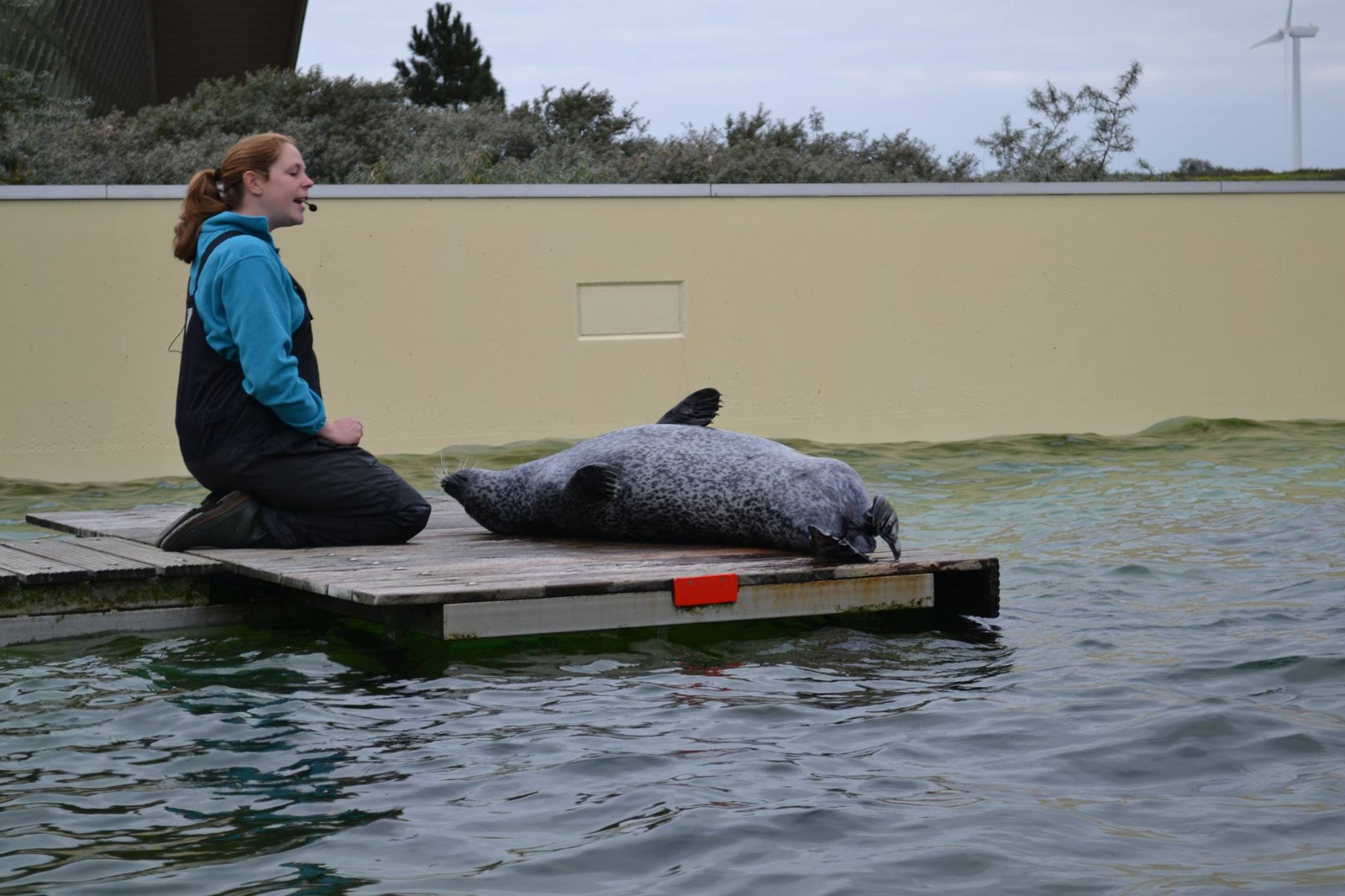
Seal and sea lion show

- Seals and Sea-lions. Since 2000, there are 4 harbor seals in the park. Shows are given throughout the year. Since 2012, there are also three sea lions. There are now also two wild seagulls fed during the show.
- Water Playground. This was completed in 1996 and is one of the most popular attractions. The playground consists of a round hole with a diameter of forty meters, surrounded by a dike. On the embankment flows water pumped from the sea, in a gutter. Along the route of the gutter, waterfalls and streams are placed so visitors can change the flow and the course of water. Other components are an Archimedes screw, a water wheel, a water organ and a water tunnel caves. The eye-catching landmark of the Water Playground is an eight-meter high windmill.
- Water Pavilion/ Whale World Expo. Shaped to vaguely resemble a whale, this attraction was designed by architect Lars Spuybroek and is considered one of the earliest examples of parametric architecture. Visitors start by entering the silver tail section of the building. This part is designed by NOX architects from Rotterdam. There are no windows and the floors are not level. Walking through these corridors is different from normal museum exhibits as each stage provides different experiences such as liquid water spray from a geyser, things to make a person jump and large deluges of rain, in addition to educational pieces about whales and whaling in the black part of the building designed by Kas Oosterhuis.
- Boat trip. Since May 2005, Deltapark Neeltje Jans has been the owner of the Breejen Boat Company. During the season the 'Christiaan B' offers boat trips on the National Park Oosterschelde. These tours last one hour and are only accessible to visitors of Deltapark Neeltje Jans. The ship has a capacity of 600 visitors. During the tours information is given in Dutch, German and English about the nature area and its inhabitants. During the trips marine mammals such as seals and porpoises are frequently seen.
- Waterslide. Near to the Water playground is the 60-meter water slide which has operated since 2003. In twin person boats guests descend about 12 meters over a couple of bumps.
- The hurricane machine. This is a Swiss fabricated cocoon-shaped building 15 meters long and 7 meters wide in which a large fan is installed. In ten seconds, the wind is increased from calm to 133 kilometers per hour. Guests adorned with goggles can experience a storm with hurricane-force winds in groups of about 12 people. The hurricane machine has been in use since April 2003.
- Delta Experience. This is an educational attraction about the 1953 North Sea Flood with a panorama view of the day, but with film images and special effects.
