= Marcel Stive =

Professor of coastal engineering

Marcel J.F. Stive
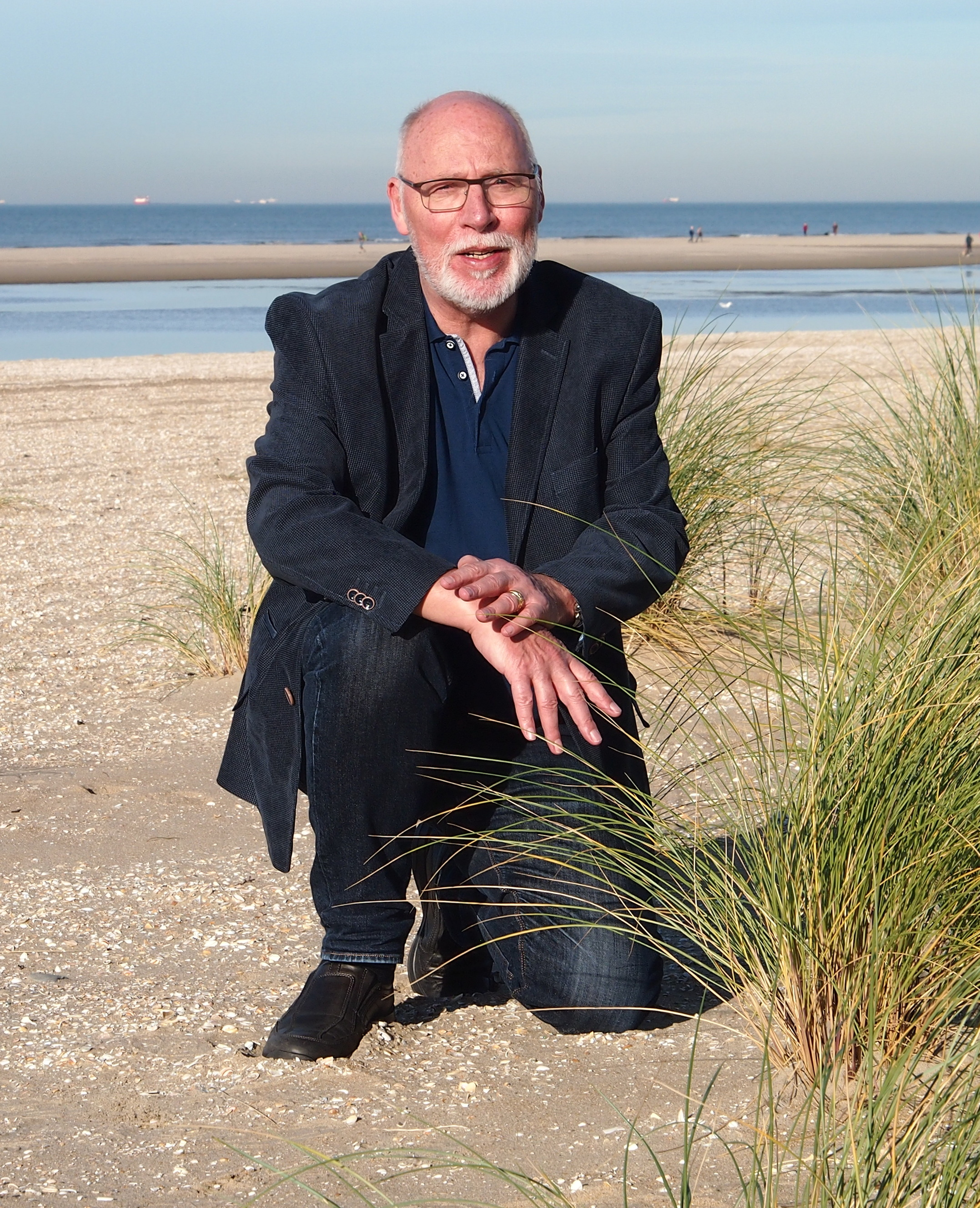
- Born: February 25, 1951; Amsterdam
- Education: Delft University of Technology
- Awards: * Honorary degree (Lund University, Sweden); * International Coastal Engineering Award (ASCE); * Knight in the order of the Dutch Lion
- Scientific career
- Fields: Coastal Engineering
- Patrons: Delft Hydraulics, Delft University of Technology
- Thesis: Cross-shore flow in waves breaking on a beach (1988)
- Doctoral advisor: prof. J.A. Battjes

Marcel J.F. Stive (Amsterdam, February 25, 1951) is a Dutch professor of coastal engineering at the Faculty of Civil Engineering and Geosciences of Delft University of Technology.

== Biography ==
=== Education and career ===
Marcel Stive studied Civil engineering at the Delft University of Technology, where he graduated in 1977 and received his doctorate in 1988 under professor Jurjen Battjes.

After graduating in 1977 Stive started working at WL | Delft Hydraulics, where he worked until 1992. In 1992 he became a professor at the Polytechnic University of Catalonia in Barcelona, Spain. In 1994 he returned to WL-Delft Hydraulics and at the same time began to work as a professor of Coastal Morphodynamics at the Delft University of Technology.

=== Current academic positions ===
From 2001 Stive is a professor of Coastal Engineering at Delft University of Technology and he is the scientific director of the Water Research Centre Delft since 2003. In 2017 he retired with the lecture "Once the dunes breach".

=== Advisory and professional activities ===
Stive has been a consultant to the IPCC subgroup on Coastal Zone Vulnerability to Sea-level Rise since 1990. In 2008 Stive became part of the second Dutch Deltacommittee, an independent Committee of State and successor of the 1953 Deltacommittee (advising on the Delta Works), in which he gave advice on Flood control in the Netherlands for the next century. Since 2010 Stive is leading an InterAcademy Panel team, to produce a UN targeted report on crucial water issues, which involves the commitment of National Science Foundation's around the world. Furthermore, Stive is an expert advisor to several national governments. For example, Vietnam on the Mekong Delta, China on Land reclamation in Jiangsu and the United States on the Mississippi River and San Francisco Bay Area.

Stive is also the inventor of the Sand engine. A total of 21.5 million cubic metres sand, spreading 128 hectares in size, that has been applied along the coast of South Holland at Ter Heijde in 2011. It is an innovative method for Coastal management.

=== Awards ===
In 2011 Stive received an Honorary degree at the Lund University in Sweden because of his to his significant scientific contribution to the understanding of how climate change will affect the world's coastal areas.

In 2013 Stive was appointed Knight in the Order of the Netherlands Lion for his record as researcher, consulted expert, engineer and teacher.

In 2015 Stive received both the Coastal Sediments 2015 Coastal Award and the International Coastal Engineering award from the American Society of Civil Engineers.

== Publications ==
=== Selected books ===
- Begum, S.; Stive, Marcel J.F.; Hall, James W. (Eds.), 2007, Flood Risk Management in Europe: Innovation in Policy and Practice, Series:, Vol. 25, ISBN 1-4020-4199-3.
- Stive, M.J.F. (Editor) Coastal Engineering, Volume 53 (Coastal Hydrodynamics and Morphodynamics), Issues 2–3, Pages 119-310 (February 2006).
- L. Hamm and M.J.F. Stive. Guest editors of Coastal Engineering, Volume 47, Issue 2, Pages 79–264 (December 2002).
- J. Bosboom and M.J.F. Stive, 2023, Coastal dynamics, ISBN 978-94-6366-371-7

=== Selected book chapters ===
- Stive, M.J.F., Cowell, PJ & Nicholls, RJ, 2009. Beaches, cliffs and deltas. In O Slaymaker, T Spencer & C Embleton-Hamann (Eds.), Geomorphology and global environmental change (pp. 158–179). New York: Cambridge University Press.
- Stive, M.J.F., Ranasinghe, R. and Cowell, P. 2009. Sea level rise and coastal erosion. In YC Kim (Ed.), Handbook of coastal and ocean engineering (pp. 1023–1038). Imperial College Press.
- Stive, M.J.F. and Vrijling, J.K., 2005. A dynamic coastal landscape. In: Atlas of Dutch water cities, Ed: Hooimeijer, F., Meyer, H. and Nienhuis, A., SUN publishers, pp 46–51 (published both in Dutch and English).
- Stive, M.J.F. and Wang, Z.B., 2003. Morphodynamic modelling of tidal basins and coastal inlets. Ch 13 in: Advances in Coastal Modeling, ed. By C. Lakhan, Elsevier, pp 367–392.
- Stive, M.J.F. and Waterman, R.E., 2002. The Netherlands: The Zuyder Zee Project, in: Coastal Systems and Continental Margins, Volume 6, Engineered Coasts, Ed. by J. Chen, D. Eisma, K. Hotta and H.J. Walker, pp 279– 290.

=== Selected scientific journals ===
- Geleynse, N., Storms, J. E. A., Stive, M. J. F., Jagers, H. R. A., Walstra, D. J. R., 2010. Modeling of a mixed-load fluvio-deltaic system, GEOPHYSICAL RESEARCH LETTERS Volume: 37 Article Number: L05402 Published: MAR 4 2010
- Ranasinghe, R. and Stive, M.J.F. 2009. Rising Seas and Retreating Coastlines: A commentary. CLIMATIC CHANGE Volume: 97 Issue: 3-4 Pages: 465-468 Published: DEC 2009.
- Stive, M.J.F., 2004. How important is global warming for coastal erosion? Climatic Change 64 (1-2): 27–39.
- Kragtwijk, N.G., Zitman, T.J., Stive, M.J.F. and Wang, Z.B., 2004. Morphological response of tidal basins to human interventions, Coastal Engineering 51: 207 – 221.
- Elias, E., Stive, M.J.F., Bonekamp, H, and Cleveringa, J., 2003. Tidal inlet dynamics in response to human intervention. Coastal Engineering Journal, Vol. 45, No. 4, 629–658.
- Cowell, P.J., Stive, M.J.F., Niedoroda, A.W., DeVriend, H.J., Swift, D.J.P., Kaminsky, G.M., and Capobianco, M., 2003. The coastal-tract (part 1): A conceptual approach to aggregated morphodynamics of low-order coastal change, Journal of Coastal Research 19(4): 812–827.
- Cowell, P.J., Stive, M.J.F., Niedoroda, A.W., Swift, D.J.P., De Vriend, H.J., Buijsman, M.C., Nicholls, R.J., Roy, P.S., Kaminsky, G.M., Cleveringa, J., Reed, C.W., and De Boer, P.L., 2003. The coastal-tract (part 2): Applications of aggregated morphodynamics of lower-order coastal change, Journal of Coastal Research 19 (4): 828–848.
- Stive, M.J.F. and Reniers, A.J.H.M., 2003. Sandbars in motion, Science, 299, 1855 – 1856.
- Hamm, L., Capobianco, M., Dette, H.H., Lechuga, A., Spanhoff, R., and M. J. F. Stive, 2002. A summary of European experience with shore nourishment, Coastal Engineering, 47(2): 237–264.
- Stive, M.J.F., Aarninkhof, S.G.J., Hamm, L., Hanson, H., Larson, M., Wijnberg, K.M., Nicholls, R.J., and Capobianco, M. 2002. Variability of shore and shoreline evolution, Coastal Engineering, 47 (2): 211–235.
- Capobianco, M., Hanson, H., Larson, M., Steetzel, H., Stive, M.J.F., Chatelus, Y., Aarninkhof, S., and Karambas, T., 2002. Nourishment design and evaluation: applicability of model concepts, Coastal Engineering, 47 (2): 113–135.
- Stive, M.J.F., Guillen, J., Capobianco, M., 1996. Bar migration and duneface oscillation on decadal scales, of the 25th international conference, September 2–6, 1996, Orlando. 3, 2884–2896.
- De Vriend, H.J., Capobianco, M., Chesher, T., De Swart, H.E., Latteux, B., Stive, M.J.F., 1993. Approaches to long-term modelling of coastal morphology: a review, Coastal Engineering, 21: 225–269.
