= Pascal Briand =

French speed skater (born 1976)

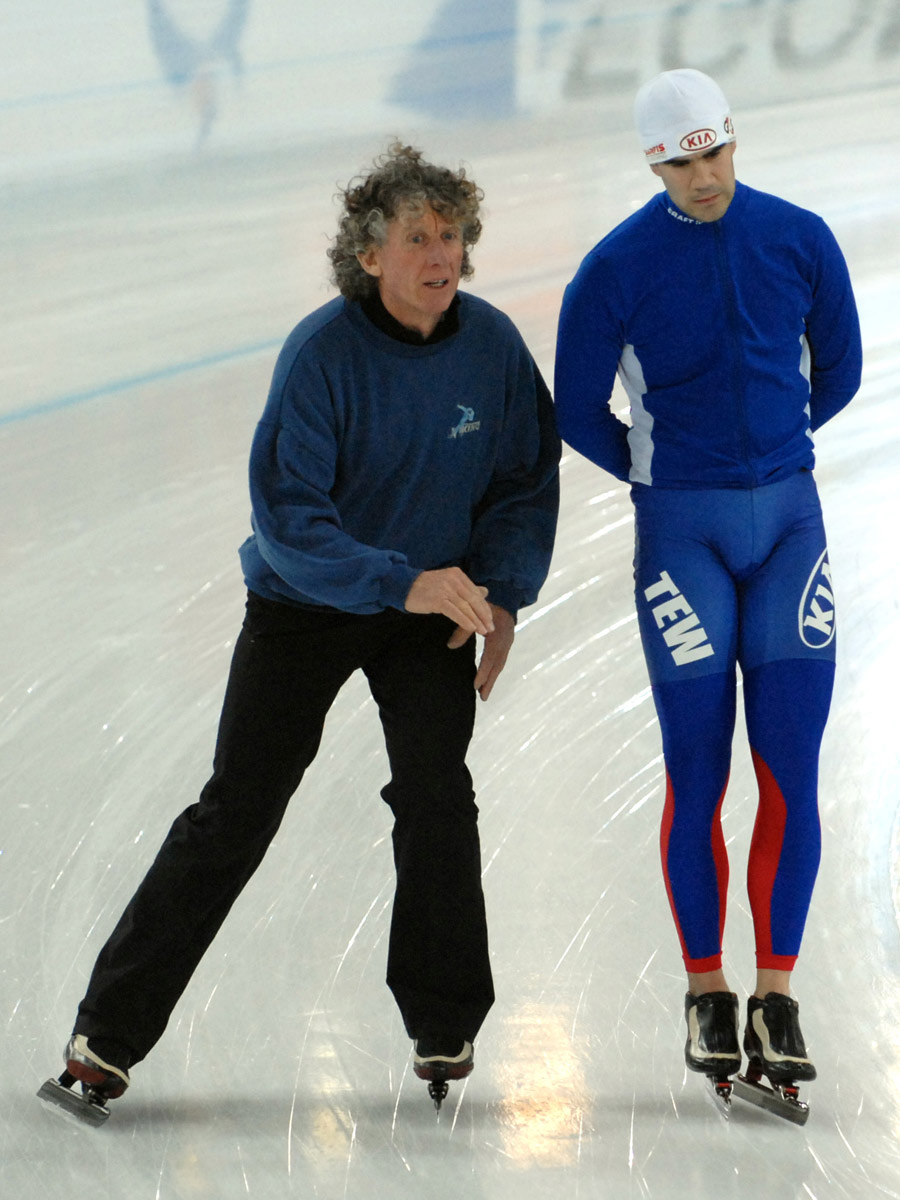

Pascal Briand (born 9 July 1976) is a French long track speed skater who participates in international competitions. Pascal Briand recently joined the Powerslide skate company in Germany where he is involved in the development of their speed skate products.

== Personal records ==
Personal records
Men's Speed skating
Event	Result	Date	Location	Notes
500 m	37.55	2007-11-03	Salt Lake City	
1,000 m	1:11.12	2007-11-18	Calgary	
1,500 m	1:47.24	2007-11-16	Calgary	
3,000 m	3:49.21	2007-11-03	Salt Lake City	
5,000 m	6:33.12	2007-11-10	Salt Lake City	
10,000 m	13:34.10	2007-12-02	Kolomna	

=== Career highlights ===
European Allround Championships
2006 - Hamar, 24th
2008 - Kolomna, 24th
