= Diederik Hol =

Dutch engineer

Diederik Hol (born 10 April 1972) is a Dutch design engineer, designer of the Dual Box inline skate frame and the Narrow Shape Cross-Section (NSX) ice blade, and founder/director of skate company Cádomotus Skating BV.

== Education and early career ==
After obtaining his engineer's degree in Design Engineering from Delft University of Technology in the Netherlands, Hol became involved in a graduate project with Interraps - a Dutch producer of inline and ice skates - working on a planned improvement of the first (Viking) clapskate design with the aim of turning a 100-year-old patent into a product that could break ice speed skating world records. In 1995 he made the news with groundbreaking innovations that made regular use of the clapskate possible. He graduated having worked on the Rotrax skate, a complex clap skate conceived as a multiple-hinge frame aimed at controlling deformation and allowing for a more powerful push-off.

== Product line designer ==
After spending time as a designer working on a wide variety of other projects, he was able to return to the niche skate design industry full-time in 1999 when approached by Sportsinline International BV to design an entire product line of inline skates for its Mogema brand. With previous employer Interraps possessing the patent that basically covered all existing inline frames at the time, Hol was driven to come up with something completely new. After a year working on the project, Hol completed the Dual Box inline frame. Results on the product were to come 2 years later in 2001 with the worldwide inline racing success of elite skaters of the period such as Jorge Botero (Colombia), Arnaud Gicquel (France) and Kalon Dobbin (New Zealand) using Dual Box frames in World Inline Cup and World Inline Speed Skating Championship events.

== Ice speedskating ==
Subsequently, Hol returned his design focus to ice speedskating and, based on technologies being utilised in the development of hockey and figure skates, designed the Narrow Shape Cross-Section (NSX) ice blade. The NSX was the first ice skate produced under the Mogema name and was a departure from the traditional rigid, pre-bent racing blades used in longtrack speed skating, providing a straight blade that featured an adaptive radius. The NSX product line was expanded by Mogema in response to growing market interest at the time, however in a traditionally change-resistant ice speedskating market the product never achieved a significant market share.

== New business ==
Following the decommissioning of Sportsinline International by its parent company in 2006, Hol started working for his own company. In February 2007, new skate company Cádomotus Skating BV appeared online and through a global network of distributors in the niche speed skating market with ice and inline speed skates.

In recent years, Hol has increasingly shifted his focus to the sport of triathlon. This shift was partly motivated by the popularity of the Omega aero-helmet among triathletes in the Dutch national competition. Hol developed two types of cycling shoes, based on his expertise in the production of skate and inline skate shoes. These shoes have a carbon sole that improves cycling efficiency, that could lead to faster running times. For the 2023 season, several professional athletes are expected to use the Cádomotus shoes.

== Helmets ==
Most notable of all Cádomotus products are the helmets, used by several marathon teams, but also national speedskating teams, like the Japanese Olympic speed skating squad. Safety and aerodynamics were key for the developments of Hol's helmets. Two Dutch technical universities have tested the most recent helmet in various conditions, from long-track sprinting to marathon and team pursuit. The helmet outperformed all competitors currently on the market. For improved safety, Hol invented the honeycomb structure, which absorbs shocks better than traditional EPS foam and makes it impossible for sharp skate blades to penetrate through the ventilation holes to the head. This makes the Omega helmet one of the safest helmets in the peloton. Due to its aerodynamics, the helmet is also quickly becoming popular in triathlon sports.
