= Lars Spuybroek =

Dutch architect (born 1959)

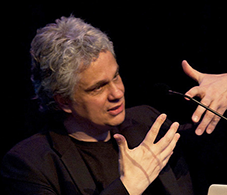
Lars Spuybroek

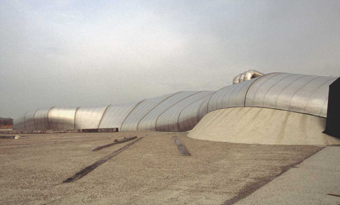
HtwoOexpo, the water pavilion by NOX/Lars Spuybroek (1997-).

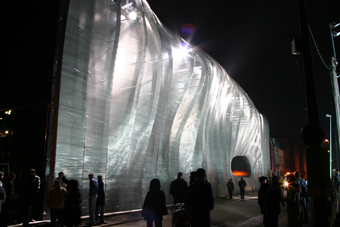
Maison Folie. Lille, France (2003-).

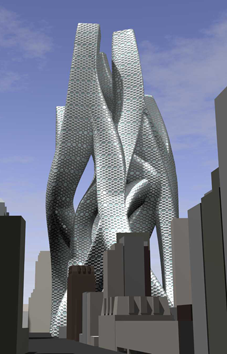
Design for a new WTC (November 2001) at ground zero, New York.

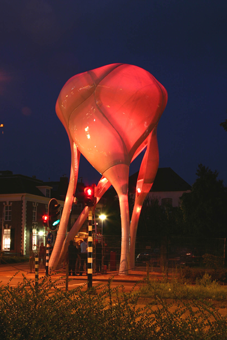
The interactive D-tower colored red indicating love is the emotion most intensely experienced at that moment. Doetinchem, Netherlands (2004-).

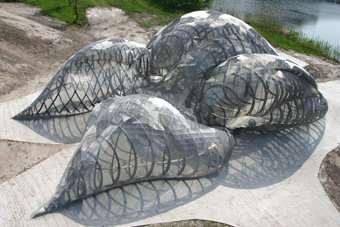
The interactive Son-O-House in Son en Breugel, Netherlands (2004-).

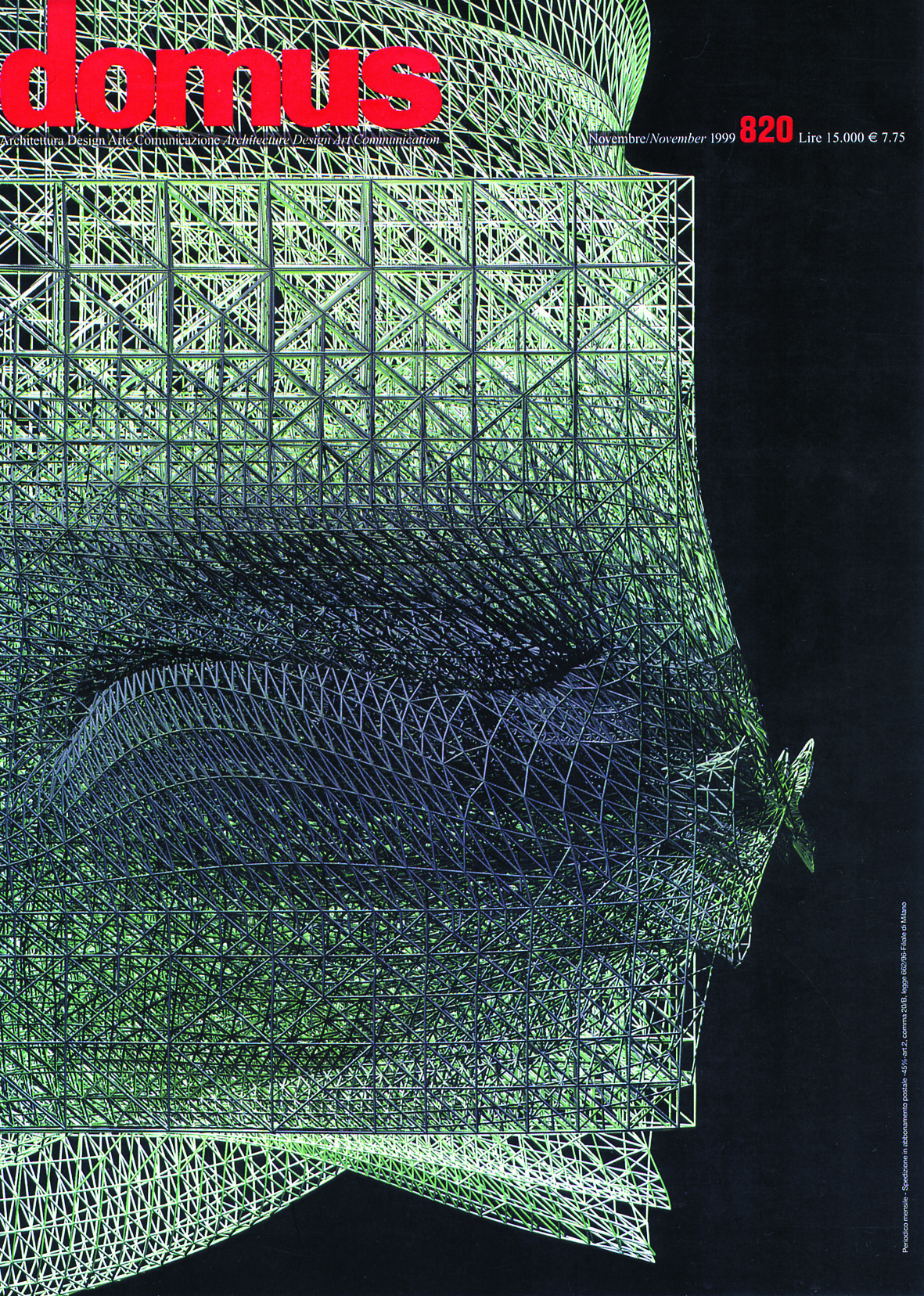
Cover design Domus no. 820, November 1999.

Lars Matthias M. Spuybroek (born September 16, 1959, Rotterdam) is a Dutch architect and theorist who lives and works in Atlanta, where he is professor of architecture.

== Education ==
Born in Vreewijk in the south of Rotterdam, he spent most of his childhood in Hillegersberg, in the north of the city. He graduated cum laude at the Technical University Delft in 1989. A year later, he won the Archiprix for his Palazzo Pensile, a new royal palace for Queen Beatrix in Rotterdam. Shortly after, he started NOX-magazine with Maurice Nio, of which four issues were published in Dutch between 1991 and 1994 (A: Actiones in Distans, B: Biotech, C: Chloroform, and D: Djihad). From 1995 until 2010, Lars Spuybroek was the sole principal of the office that carried the name NOX, which was responsible for several buildings and artworks in the Netherlands and abroad.

== Career ==
Lars Spuybroek broke onto the international scene of architecture with his water pavilion on the island of Neeltje Jans (opened in 1997), a building consisting of two halves of which he designed the silvery freshwater part. The renowned architecture critic Charles Jencks qualified the building in The New Paradigm of Architecture as “yet to be surpassed.” The water pavilion is the first building that has an interactive interior where visitors can transform sound and lighting conditions by actively using sensors. It also has a so-called continuous geometry, where floors, walls and ceilings merge into a smooth whole. This form of blobitecture was later officially coined "non-standard architecture" at the large group exhibition of the same name at the Centre Pompidou (2003) in Paris. This architecture advocates a technological revolution where powerful computing-tools are deployed to replace simple repetition of elements by continuous variation. The computer is used as much in the design (CAD) as in the manufacture (CAM) and sometimes even in augmenting human experience. These techniques are extensively discussed in his books titled NOX: Machining Architecture (2004) and The Architecture of Continuity (2008).

Though the projects seem very experimental, in interviews Lars Spuybroek always rejects a connection to futurism (which generally refers to the car- or filmindustry) or organicism (referring to natural forms) and only points at historical examples. Among these are Gottfried Semper’s Der Stil (1860-62), Wilhelm Worringer’s Form in Gothic (1911) and William Hogarth’s The Analysis of Beauty (1753). Other influences that are often quoted are D'Arcy Thompson's On Growth and Form (1917) and the work of German architect-engineer Frei Otto. One of the traits common to all these is a sinuous complexity and delicacy of form, another that the aesthetics are more of feeling and bodily experience than of mental judgement. Blobs he dismisses as "uncontrolled variation" and being "at the low-end of architectural articulation." He has a strong belief in the cultural effects of new technologies: "Soon it will be possible to have completely unique parts in a built structure for a price that before would only be possible through huge amounts of repetition - a variable prefab, or as it is called in production terms, mass customization. We are dissolving the opposition between elitist handwork and machined parts, between emotionality and high-tech, between Art Nouveau and Bauhaus."

In 2001 his design for a new WTC in New York brought him renewed international attention. A few years later, in 2004, several works of Lars Spuybroek were completed. In France the Maison Folie de Wazemmes was opened, a cultural center at the heart of a derelict area in Lille. In the Netherlands the D-tower was completed, a large, interactive sculpture for the city of Doetinchem which he created together with Dutch artist Q.S. Serafijn. This tower connects directly to a website that surveys the emotional lives of the inhabitants. Close to Eindhoven, in the small city of Son-en-Breugel, the Son-O-House was opened, an interactive sound sculpture conceived together with composer Edwin van der Heide.

== Teaching and Writing ==
In 2001 Lars Spuybroek was appointed Professor of Digital Design Techniques at the University of Kassel in Germany. And from 1998 until 2006 he also taught intermittently at Columbia University in New York. Since 2006 he is a full Professor and the Ventulett Distinguished Chair in Architectural Design at the Georgia Institute of Technology in Atlanta where he published two books on Research and Design. The first, released in 2009, was titled The Architecture of Variation and the second in 2011 Textile Tectonics. Both publications use the research into various forms of patterning (hair braiding, leaf venation, knitting, gothic tracery, foam packing, etc.) as a new source for design methodologies based on figures and configurations.

In 2011 Spuybroek gave a more political and ethical interpretation of these ideas by publishing a study into the work of John Ruskin (The Sympathy of Things: Ruskin and the Ecology of Design) which explores “the digital nature of gothic,” revealing a fundamental connection between digital design and Gothic architecture. The book proposes a vision of mass production of unique artifacts designed and built algorithmically by “our slaves of steel“ and explores Ruskin’s broad range of concepts in the context of later aesthetic theorists and philosophers such as William James, A. N. Whitehead and Henri Bergson. Since then he has been involved in various publications that evolved from the work on John Ruskin, mainly on the topics of beauty and grace, of which many articles and essays can be read online. This research culminated in 2020 with the release of Grace and Gravity: Architectures of the Figure. With this panoramic study Spuybroek broadened his scope from a purely architectural perspective to what he calls a “nonhumanities,” a philosophy of human-thing interactions based on ancient notions of grace and gift exchange.

== Personal life ==
Lars Spuybroek has been married since 1995 to Joke Brouwer, co-founder of V2 Institute for the Unstable Media.

== Published works ==
- The Art of the Accident. Co-edited with Joke Brouwer and Arjen Mulder (Rotterdam: V2_Publishing, 1998)
- The Weight of the Image (Rotterdam: Nai010 Publishers, 2001)
- NOX: Machining Architecture, with contributions by Manuel DeLanda, Detlef Mertins, Andrew Benjamin, and Brian Massumi (London: Thames and Hudson, 2004. German edition with Deutsche Verlags-Anstalt, München, 2004)
- The Architecture of Continuity: Essays and Conversations (Rotterdam: V2_Publishing, 2008. Italian edition with Deleyva Editore, Roma, 2013)
- Research & Design: The Architecture of Variation (London: Thames and Hudson, 2009)
- The Politics of the Impure. Co-edited with Joke Brouwer and Arjen Mulder (Rotterdam: V2_Publishing, 2010)
- Research & Design: Textile Tectonics (Rotterdam: Nai010 Publishers, 2011)
- The Sympathy of Things: Ruskin and the Ecology of Design (Rotterdam: V2_Publishing, 2011/ London: Bloomsbury, 2016)
- Vital Beauty: Reclaiming Aesthetics in the Tangle of Technology and Nature. Co-edited with Joke Brouwer and Arjen Mulder (Rotterdam: V2_Publishing, 2012)
- The War of Appearances: Transparency, Opacity, Radiance. Co-edited with Joke Brouwer and Sjoerd van Tuinen (Rotterdam: V2_Publishing, 2016)
- Grace and Gravity: Architectures of the Figure (London: Bloomsbury, 2020)

== Awards ==
In 1989 Lars Spuybroek received the Archiprix, in 1995 the Mart Stam Incentive Prize and in 1997 the Iakov Chernikov Award and the Zeeuwse Architectuurprijs. Two years later he was also nominated for the Mies van der Rohe Award. In 2006 he received the Kölner Klopfer (Cologne Thumper) for "Weltbeste Designer."

== Exhibitions ==
- Less Aesthetics, More Ethics, La Biennale di Venezia, Venice (2000)
- Architectures Non Standard, Centre Pompidou, Paris (2003)
- METAMORPH, La Biennale di Venezia, Venice (2004)
- Design and the Elastic Mind, MoMA, New York (2008)
- Archaeology of the Digital: Media and Machines, Canadian Centre for Architecture, Montreal (2014)
- The Architecture Machine, Architekturmuseum der TUM, Munich (2020)
