= Roemer van Toorn =

Dutch architectural theorist

Roemer van Toorn, born 1960 in Amsterdam, Netherlands, is a Dutch architectural theorist, professor, writer, lecturer and photographer. Currently he is Professor Architectural Theory at the Umeå School of Architecture (UMA), in Umeå, Sweden.

== Academic career ==
In 1991 Van Toorn received the Master of Architecture degree (with honours) from the Technical University Delft, the Netherlands. He has been in charge of the history and theory program, was head of publications, and head of the PhD research school at the Berlage Institute Postgraduate Laboratory of Architecture, in Rotterdam (from 1993–2010). He was a guest professor at the Delft School of Design (DSD), Delft University of Technology, The Netherlands (2004–2010), and guest professor at the Universität der Künste (2007–2008), Berlin, Germany, while at the same time pursuing a career as international lecturer and educator.

Since 2013 Roemer van Toorn is the architectural theory professor and director of the PhD research school at the newly established Umeå School of Architecture (in 2009) at Umeå University, Sweden.

=== Research and writing ===
His research has focused on areas of national and international architecture, modernization, critical and political theory and as well on theoretical issues in contemporary architecture practice, policy and education. His work as researcher, educator, editor, architectural critic and photographer has been widely published and is international known. In 1994 he published his first book together with Ole Bouman, the encyclopaedic manifest “The Invisible in Architecture”. He has been the co-editor of several issues of the annual publication Architecture in the Netherlands. He has been an advisor and contributor of the architecture magazines Archis, Volume, Domus, Abitare, Nordic Journal of Architecture and Lo-Res Swedish PhD research magazine, and was one of the founding members together with Jennifer Sigler and Wiel Arets of magazine Hunch, the Berlage report. As author and photographer he contributes to Dutch, English, German, Swiss, Swedish and other international publications. In 2011 his publication “Wiel Arets: Stills, A timeline of ideas, articles & interviews 1982–2010” was awarded Best Dutch Book Design.

Currently he is investigating how different contemporary practices can make architecture politically under the title “Aesthetics as a Form of Politics”, while finalizing his text-image publication “Society of the And” with the support of the Swedish Research Council Formas.

== Publications ==
- 1994 – The Invisible in Architecture
- 2013 – The society of the And: the bewildering interdependence of our times
- 2015 – Making architecture politically
