= World Inline Cup =

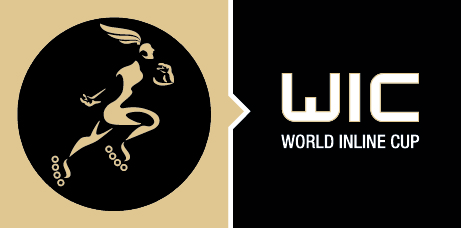
World Inline Cup logo.

The World Inline Cup is the leading competition in inline speed skating.

== History ==
In 1999 first attempts in order to establish a racing series with standardized evaluation system and rules were made. The then called European Inline Cup was managed by CERS (Confédération Européenne de Roller Skating). Back then the company Playlife was its main sponsor. In 2000 the Grand Prix, including the eight biggest competitions in Europe, occurred for the first time. Since 2001 competitions were held all over the world. The evaluation categories Grand Prix, Class 1 and Class 2 were born.

In 2003 the IGUANA Think Thank AG, which already was supporting the Swiss Inline Cup, took over the organization of the Cup, naming it World-Inline-Cup. 3 years later IGUANA Schweiz AG superseded the IGUANA Think Thank AG until finally IGUANA Deutschland GmbH, resident in Berlin, undertook the organization in 2014. Furthermore, they have been maintaining the German Inline Cup since 2008.

== Evaluation mode ==
Since 2000 there were various changes regarding the evaluation system. In the beginning all races were equivalent Grand-Prix-races. Departs 2001 two additional races, depending on how reputable the competition was, were launched: Class 1 and Class 2.

From 2003 onwards, the class Grand Prix was replaced by Top Class. Until 2004 the three classes existed equally. In the following year there was no Class 2-race taking place for the first time.

Since 2010 only the classes Top Class and Class 1 persisted. In 2017 an additional Junior Ranking was launched.

== Point Scale (Stand 2019) ==
The awarding of score is inflexible. There are two different types of evaluation of the races in which the winner can either score 90 or up until 150 points. The points of Top-Class-races outside of Europe are multiplied by 1.2, whereas the points of the final race of the season are multiplied by 1.4.

Point Scale Top Class
| Ranking | Points | Ranking | Points | Ranking | Points | Ranking | Points | Ranking | Points |
|---|---|---|---|---|---|---|---|---|---|
| 1. | 150 | 11. | 71 | 21. | 38 | 31. | 20 | 41. | 10 |
| 2. | 130 | 12. | 67 | 22. | 36 | 32. | 19 | 42. | 9 |
| 3. | 120 | 13. | 63 | 23. | 34 | 33. | 18 | 43. | 8 |
| 4. | 110 | 14. | 59 | 24. | 32 | 34. | 17 | 44. | 7 |
| 5. | 100 | 15. | 55 | 25. | 30 | 35. | 16 | 45. | 6 |
| 6. | 95 | 16. | 52 | 26. | 28 | 36. | 15 | 46. | 5 |
| 7. | 90 | 17. | 49 | 27. | 26 | 37. | 14 | 47. | 4 |
| 8. | 85 | 18. | 46 | 28. | 24 | 38. | 13 | 48. | 3 |
| 9. | 80 | 19. | 43 | 29. | 22 | 39. | 12 | 49. | 2 |
| 10. | 75 | 20. | 40 | 30. | 21 | 40. | 11 | 50. | 1 |

Point Scale Class 1
| Ranking | Points | Ranking | Points | Ranking | Points | Ranking | Points |
|---|---|---|---|---|---|---|---|
| 1. | 90 | 6. | 48 | 11. | 24 | 16. | 9 |
| 2. | 75 | 7. | 44 | 12. | 21 | 17. | 6 |
| 3. | 68 | 8. | 38 | 13. | 18 | 18. | 3 |
| 4. | 60 | 9. | 32 | 14. | 15 | 19. | 2 |
| 5. | 52 | 10. | 27 | 15. | 12 | 20. | 1 |

== Overall Champions ==
=== Woman ===
| Year | Winner | Second | Third |
| 2000 | (Spain) Sheila Herrero | (France) Angèle Vaudan | (United States) Ashley Horgan |
| 2001 | (United States) Ashley Horgan | (France) Angèle Vaudan | (France) Nathalie Barbotin |
| 2002 | (Argentina) Andrea Haritchelhar | | |
| 2003 | (United States) Jessica Smith | (Italy) Adelia Marra | (France) Angèle Vaudan |
| 2004 | (United States) Theresa Cliff | (Italy) Laura Lardani | (France) Nathalie Barbotin |
| 2005 | (Italy) Laura Lardani | (France) Angèle Vaudan | (New Zealand) Nicole Begg |
| 2006 | (France) Angèle Grandgirard | (New Zealand) Nicole Begg | (France) Nathalie Barbotin |
| 2007 | (Italy) Laura Lardani | (Spain) Sandra Gómez | (Italy) Giovanna Turchiarelli |
| 2008 | (Colombia) Cecilia Baena | (New Zealand) Nicole Begg | (Colombia) Alexandra Vivas |
| 2009 | (Colombia) Cecilia Baena | (Italy) Giovanna Turchiarelli | (Germany) Jana Gegner |
| 2010 | (Italy) Giovanna Turchiarelli | (Colombia) Cecilia Baena | (France) Nathalie Barbotin |
| 2011 | (New Zealand) Nicole Begg | (France) Mélissa Chouleysko | (Slovakia) Renata Karabova |
| 2012 | (Slovakia) Renata Karabova | (Poland) Aleksandra Goss | (Germany) Jana Gegner |
| 2013 | (Poland) Aleksandra Goss | (China) Lisha Li | (New Zealand) Nicole Begg |
| 2014 | (Italy) Francesca Lollobrigida | (Poland) Aleksandra Goss | (New Zealand) Nicole Begg |
| 2015 | (France) Juliette Pouydebat | (Poland) Aleksandra Goss | (Germany) Katharina Rumpus |
| 2016 | (Germany) Katharina Rumpus | (Slovenia) Ana Odlazek | (Ukraine) Anna Muzyka |
| 2017 | (Germany) Katharina Rumpus | (Slovenia) Ana Odlazek | (France) Chloe Geoffroy |
| 2018 | (Germany) Katharina Rumpus | (Italy) Carlotta Camarin | (Slovenia) Ana Odlazek |
| 2019 | (Colombia) Aura Quintana | (Germany) Katharina Rumpus | (France) Marine Lefeuvre |
| 2021 | (Mexico) Valentina L. Cartagena | (France) Marine Lefeuvre | (Netherlands) Beau G. Wagemaker |
| 2022 | (Germany) Josie Hofmann | (France) Marine Balanant | (Colombia) Aura Quintana |
| 2023 | (Colombia) Aura Quintana | (France) Marine Balanant | (France) Marine Lefeuvre |
| 2024 | (Colombia) Aura Quintana | (Netherlands) Lianne Van Loon | (Belgium) Jorun Geerts |
| 2025 | (Colombia) Aura Quintana | (France) Aubane Plouhinec | (Netherlands) Noraly Berber Vonk |
| 2026 | (Spain) Aura Quintana | (Colombia) Keily Delgado | (Netherlands) Lianne Van Loon |

=== Men ===
| Year | Winner | Second | Third |
| 2000 | (France) Pascal Briand | (Colombia) Jorge Botero | (United States) Chad Hedrick |
| 2001 | (France) Arnaud Gicquel | (Colombia) Jorge Botero | (Italy) Massimiliano Presti |
| 2002 | (Italy) Massimiliano Presti | | |
| 2003 | (France) Pascal Briand | (Italy) Massimiliano Presti | (Colombia) Jorge Botero |
| 2004 | (Italy) Massimiliano Presti | (Italy) Luca Saggiorato | (Italy) Francesco Zangarini |
| 2005 | (Italy) Massimiliano Presti | (Italy) Luca Saggiorato | (Colombia) Jorge Botero |
| 2006 | (Italy) Massimiliano Presti | (Italy) Luca Saggiorato | (Colombia) Diego Rosero |
| 2007 | (Italy) Massimiliano Presti | (Italy) Fabio Francolini | (Italy) Stefano Galliazzo |
| 2008 | (France) Yann Guyader | (Italy) Luca Saggiorato | (Italy) Fabio Francolini |
| 2009 | (Colombia) Diego Rosero | (France) Yann Guyader | (Italy) Massimiliano Presti |
| 2010 | (France) Yann Guyader | (New Zealand) Kalon Dobbin | (Spain) Iñigo Vidondo |
| 2011 | (Switzerland) Severin Widmer | (Switzerland) Nicolas Iten | (France) Yann Guyader |
| 2012 | (France) Yann Guyader | (France) Julian Levrard | (Germany) Felix Rijhnen |
| 2013 | (France) Yann Guyader | (France) Nolan Beddiaf | (United States) Joey Mantia (China) Siyuan Cong |
| 2014 | (France) Yann Guyader | (France) Nolan Beddiaf | (Belgium) Bart Swings |
| 2015 | (Belgium) Bart Swings | (New Zealand) Peter Michael | (France) Ewen Fernandez |
| 2016 | (Belgium) Bart Swings | (Germany) Felix Rijhnen | (New Zealand) Peter Michael |
| 2017 | (Spain) Francisco Peula | (France) Ewen Fernandez | (Belgium) Bart Swings |
| 2018 | (Belgium) Bart Swings | (France) Ewen Fernandez | (Germany) Felix Rijhnen |
| 2019 | (Germany) Felix Rijhnen | (France) Nolan Beddiaf | (Spain) Francisco Peula |
| 2021 | (Belgium) Bart Swings | (Germany) Felix Rijhnen | (France) Martin Ferrie |
| 2022 | (France) Nolan Beddiaf | (Germany) Felix Rijhnen | (Belgium) Jason Suttels |
| 2023 | (Belgium) Bart Swings | (Belgium) Jason Suttels | (Germany) Felix Rijhnen |
| 2024 | (Belgium) Bart Swings | (Germany) Felix Rijhnen | (Belgium) Jason Suttels |
| 2025 | (France) Nolan Beddiaf | (France) Hugo Gerard | (Germany) Felix Rijhnen |
| 2026 | (France) Nolan Beddiaf | (Spain) Manuel Taibo | (Spain) Carlos Tarazona Ropero |

=== Overall Champions by countries ===
==== Women ====
| Country | Victories | Last winner |
|---|---|---|
| Colombia | 5 | Aura Quintana in 2025 |
| Italy | 4 | Francesca Lollobrigida in 2014 |
| Germany | 4 | Josie Hofmann in 2022 |
| Spain | 2 | Aura Quintana in 2026 |
| United States | 3 | Theresa Cliff in 2004 |
| France | 2 | Juliette Pouydebat in 2015 |
| Argentina | 1 | Sheila Herrero in 2002 |
| New Zealand | 1 | Nicole Begg in 2011 |
| Slovakia | 1 | Renata Karabova in 2012 |
| Poland | 1 | Aleksandra Goss in 2013 |

==== Men ====
| Country | Victories | Last winner |
|---|---|---|
| France | 11 | Nolan Beddiaf in 2026 |
| Belgium | 6 | Bart Swings in 2024 |
| Italy | 6 | Massimiliano Presti in 2007 |
| Colombia | 1 | Diego Rosero in 2009 |
| Switzerland | 1 | Severin Widmer in 2011 |
| Spain | 1 | Francisco Peula in 2017 |
| Germany | 1 | Felix Rijhnen in 2019 |

== Statistics ==
=== More victories ===
==== Women ====
| Skaters | Victories | Years |
|---|---|---|
| (Colombia) Aura Quintana | 5 | 2019, 2023, 2024, 2025, 2026 |
| (Germany) Katharina Rumpus | 3 | 2016, 2017, 2018 |
| (Italy) Laura Lardani | 2 | 2005, 2007 |
| (Colombia) Cecilia Baena | 2 | 2008, 2009 |

==== Men ====
| Skater | Victories | Years |
|---|---|---|
| (Italy) Massimiliano Presti | 6 | 2000, 2002, 2004, 2005, 2006, 2007 |
| (France) Yann Guyader | 5 | 2008, 2010, 2012, 2013, 2014 |
| (Belgium) Bart Swings | 5 | 2015, 2016, 2018, 2021, 2023 |
| (France) Nolan Beddiaf | 3 | 2022, 2025, 2026 |
| (France) Pascal Briand | 2 | 1999, 2003 |

- Bold active skaters.
