= Neeltje Jans =

Artificial island in Zeeland, the Netherlands

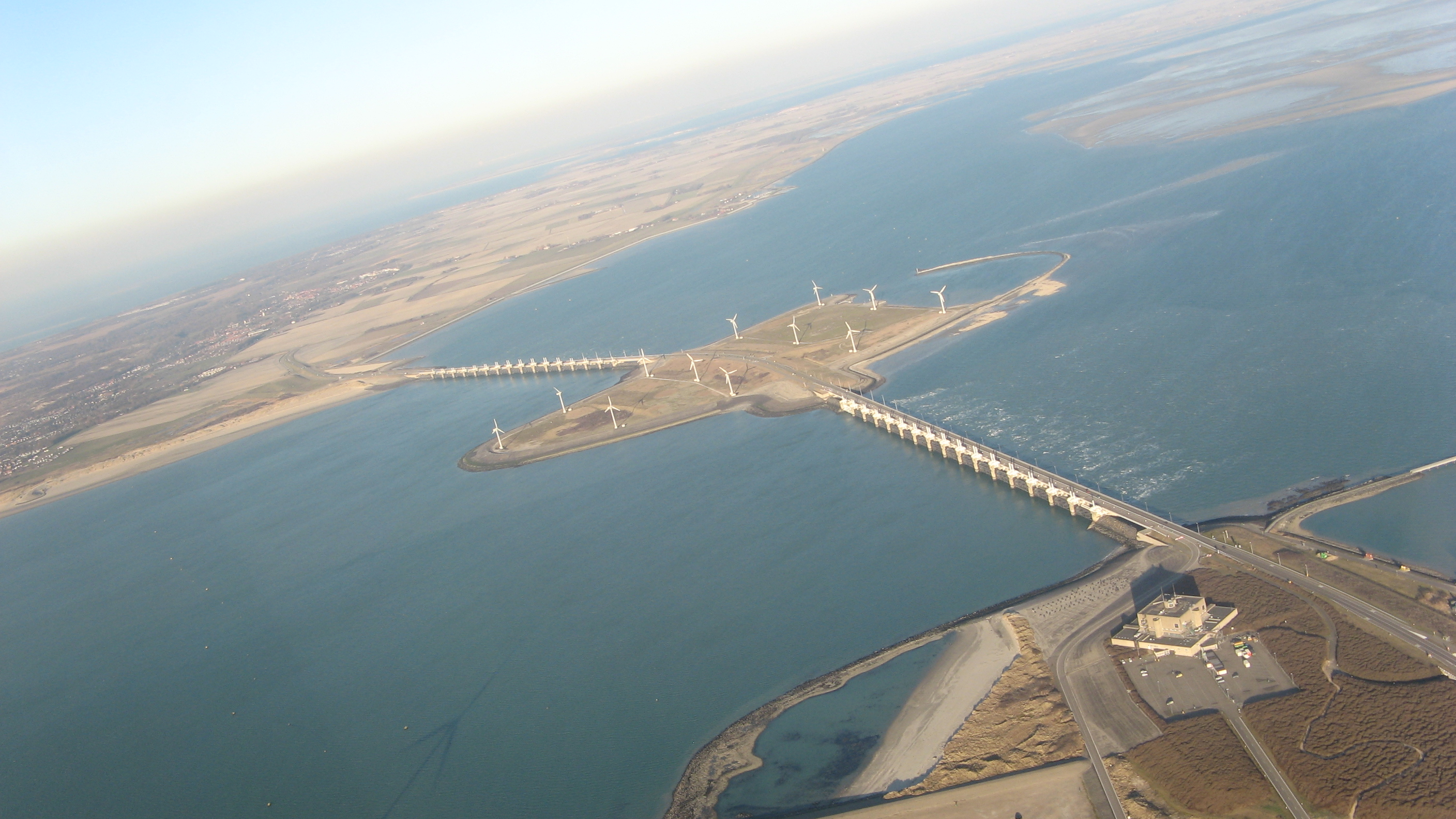
- Northern section of the flood barrier, with part of Neeltje Jans in the right bottom corner, the partial shoal Roggenplaat in the center

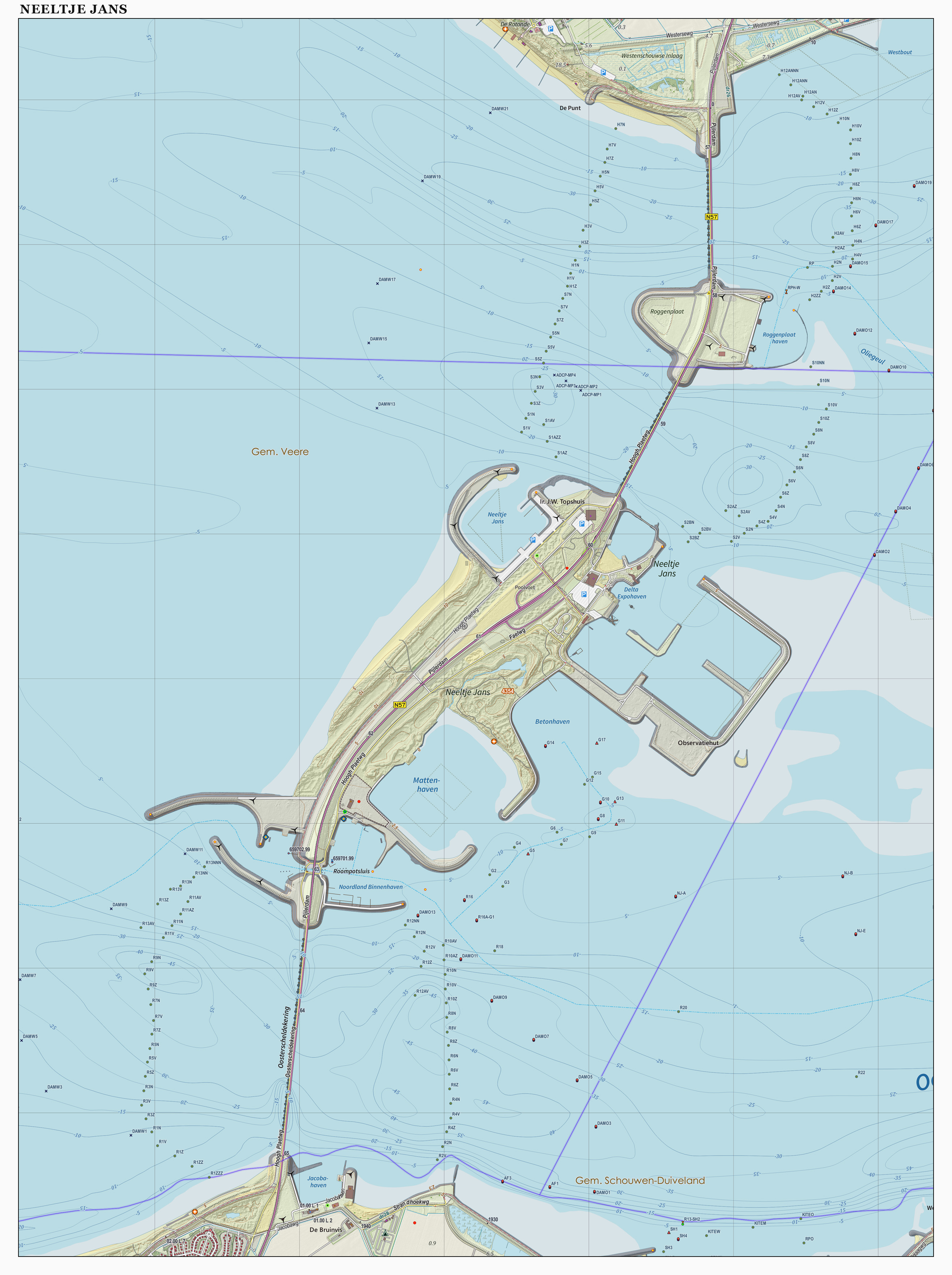
- Topographical map of the Oosterscheldedam. Neeltje Jans is the large island structure in the centre.

Geography
- Location: Eastern Scheldt
- Coordinates: 51°37′37″N 3°42′01″E

Administration
- Netherlands
- Province: Zeeland
- Municipality: Veere

Additional information
- Official website: www.neeltjejans.nl

Neeltje Jans (Dutch pronunciation: [ˌneːltɕə ˈjɑns]) is an artificial island in the Netherlands in the province of Zeeland, halfway between Noord-Beveland and Schouwen-Duiveland in the Oosterschelde. It was constructed to facilitate the construction of the Oosterscheldedam.

After the construction, a fun park with attractions and other various expositions were built on the island, which are now connected to the shore through the dam. Another addition of the island is a nature reserve.

The island was named after a nearby sand bank. The name of this sandbank has two possible origins:

- It could be named after a boat with the name Neeltje Jans, stranded on the sandbank. Neeltje is a Dutch first name (a diminutive from Cornelia or Neelie like in Neelie Kroes). Jans is a familiar surname (meaning a son or daughter of Jan).
- It could be named after a goddess of the sea, Nehalennia.

The second stage of the 2015 Tour de France finished on Neeltje Jans on 5 July 2015.

== Gallery ==
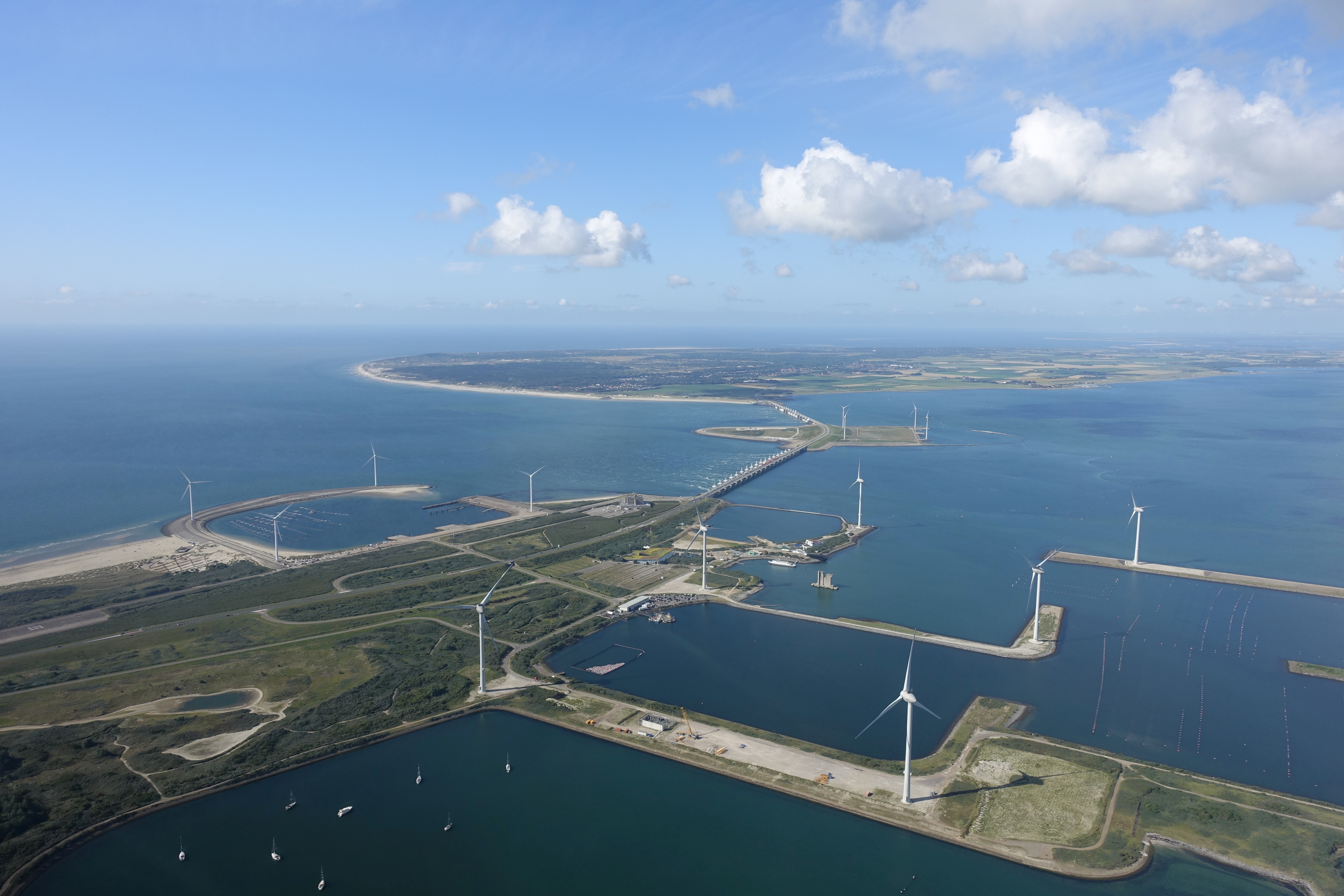
Low altitude aerial view

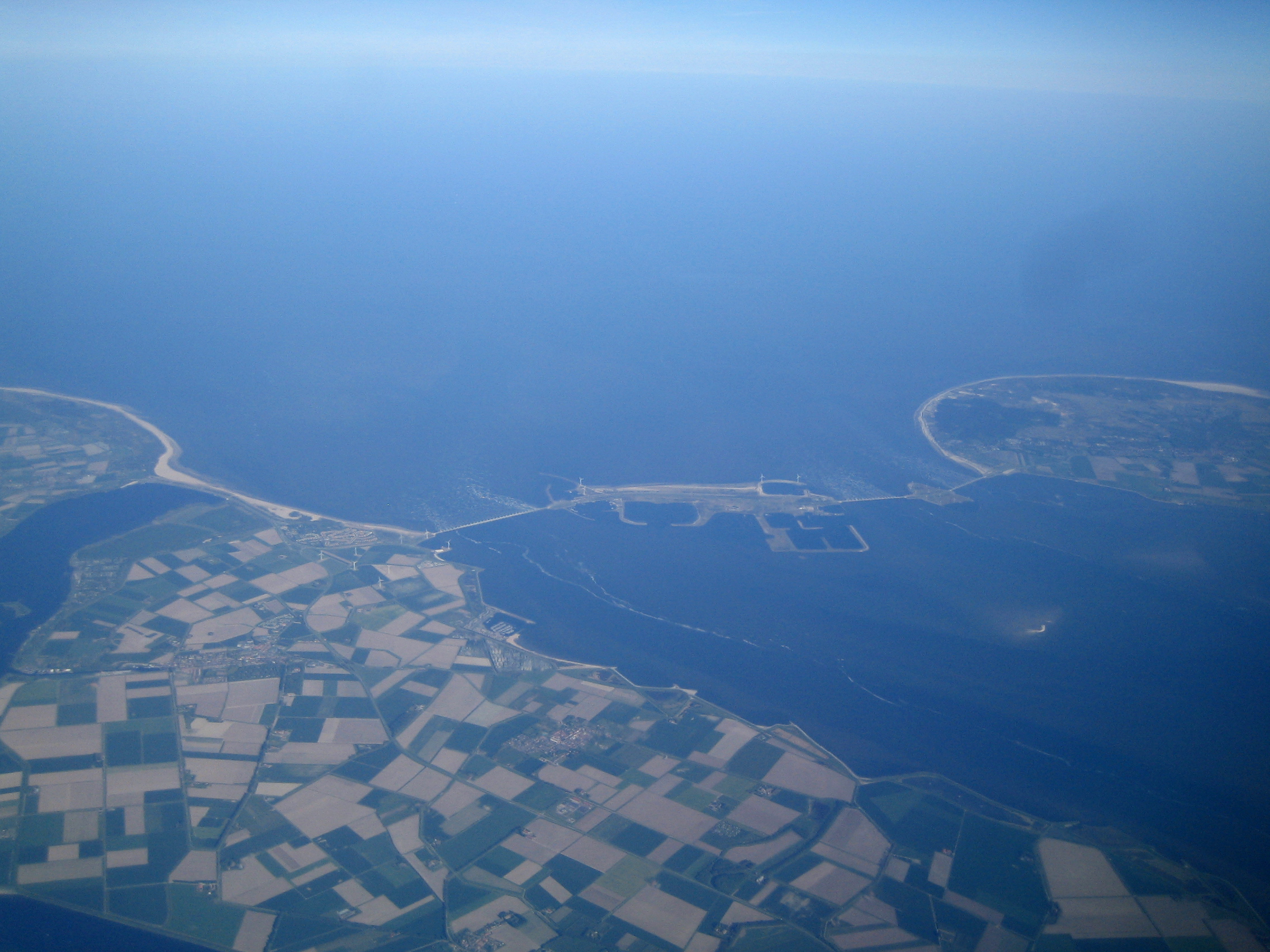
High altitude aerial view
