= Satanstornade =

Studio album by Masami Akita & Russell Haswell
- Released: 25 November 2002
- Recorded: 14 June 1999
- Venues: The Abbey, London, UK
- Genre: Noise
- Length: 47:37
- Label: Warp

Masami Akita & Russell Haswell chronology
| Live at the Neils Yard Rough Trade Shop London (2000) | Satanstornade (2002) |

Masami Akita chronology
| Merzbeat (2002) | Satanstornade (2002) | Fantail (2002) |

Russell Haswell chronology
| Live Salvage 1997→2000 (2001) | Satanstornade (2002) | Blackest Ever Black (Electroacoustic UPIC Recordings) (2008) |

Satanstornade is an album by Japanoise musician Masami Akita (better known as Merzbow) and British multimedia artist Russell Haswell. (Note: Although the album is widely credited to Akita and Haswell's real names, their previous online-exclusive release Live at the Neils Yard Rough Trade Shop London (Falsch, 2000) and other miscellaneous appearances on compilations credit the duo as Satanstornade or Satan's Tornade. The project was originally supposed to be Satan's Tornado, but it was misspelled by Akita and Haswell decided to keep the misspelling.) It was released by Warp Records on CD and vinyl on 25 November 2002.

== Recording ==
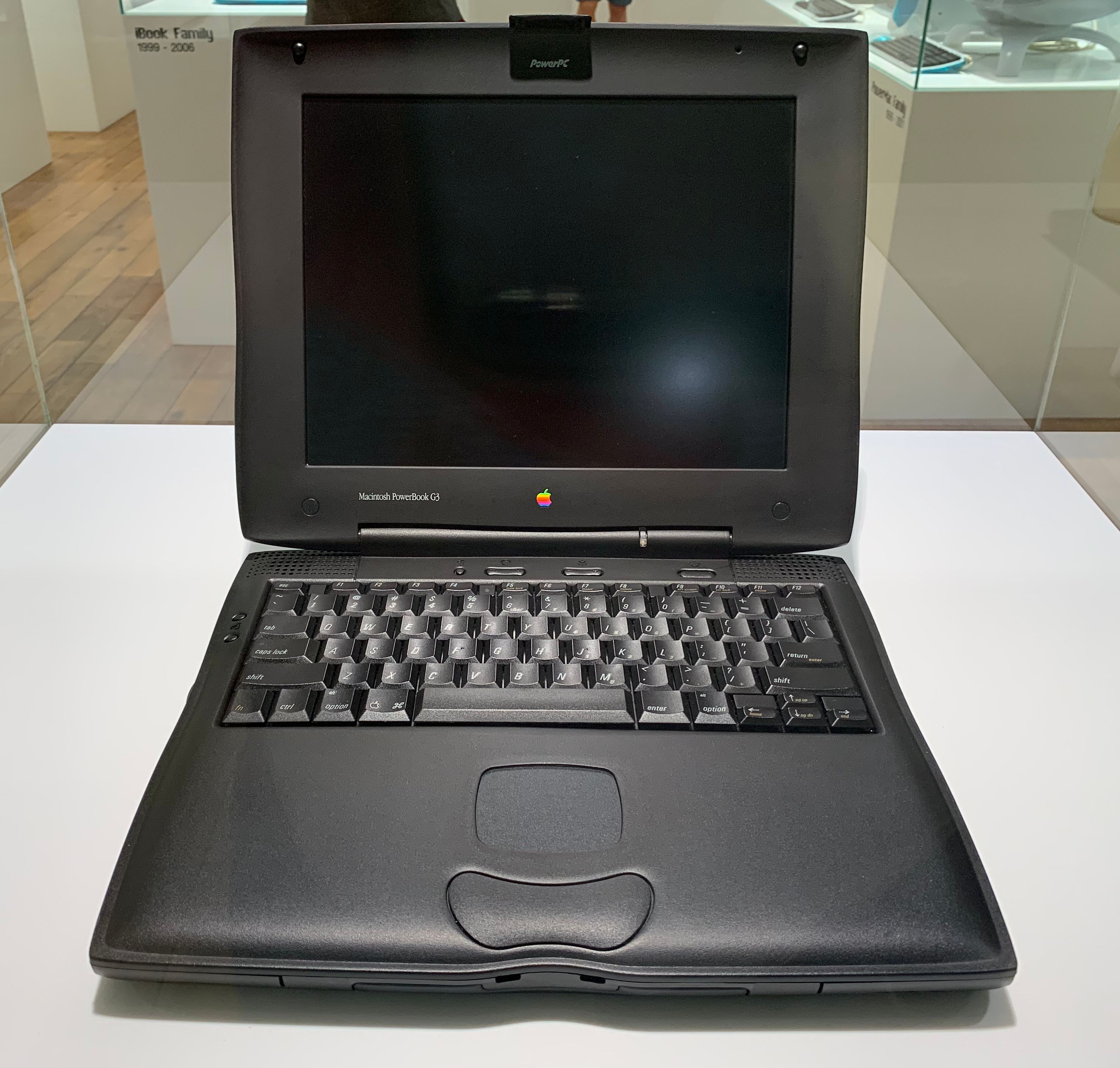
Apple PowerBook G3

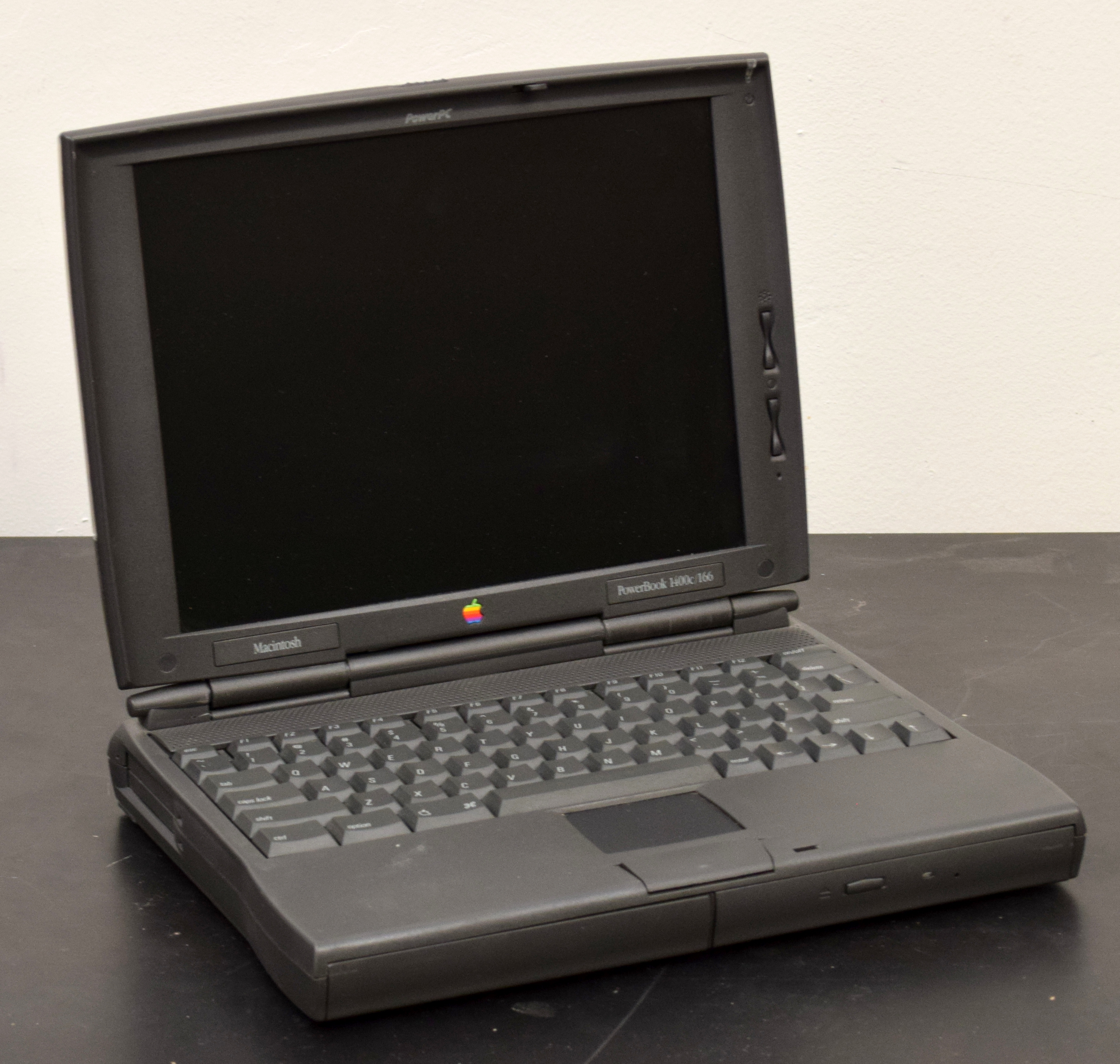
Apple PowerBook 1400c

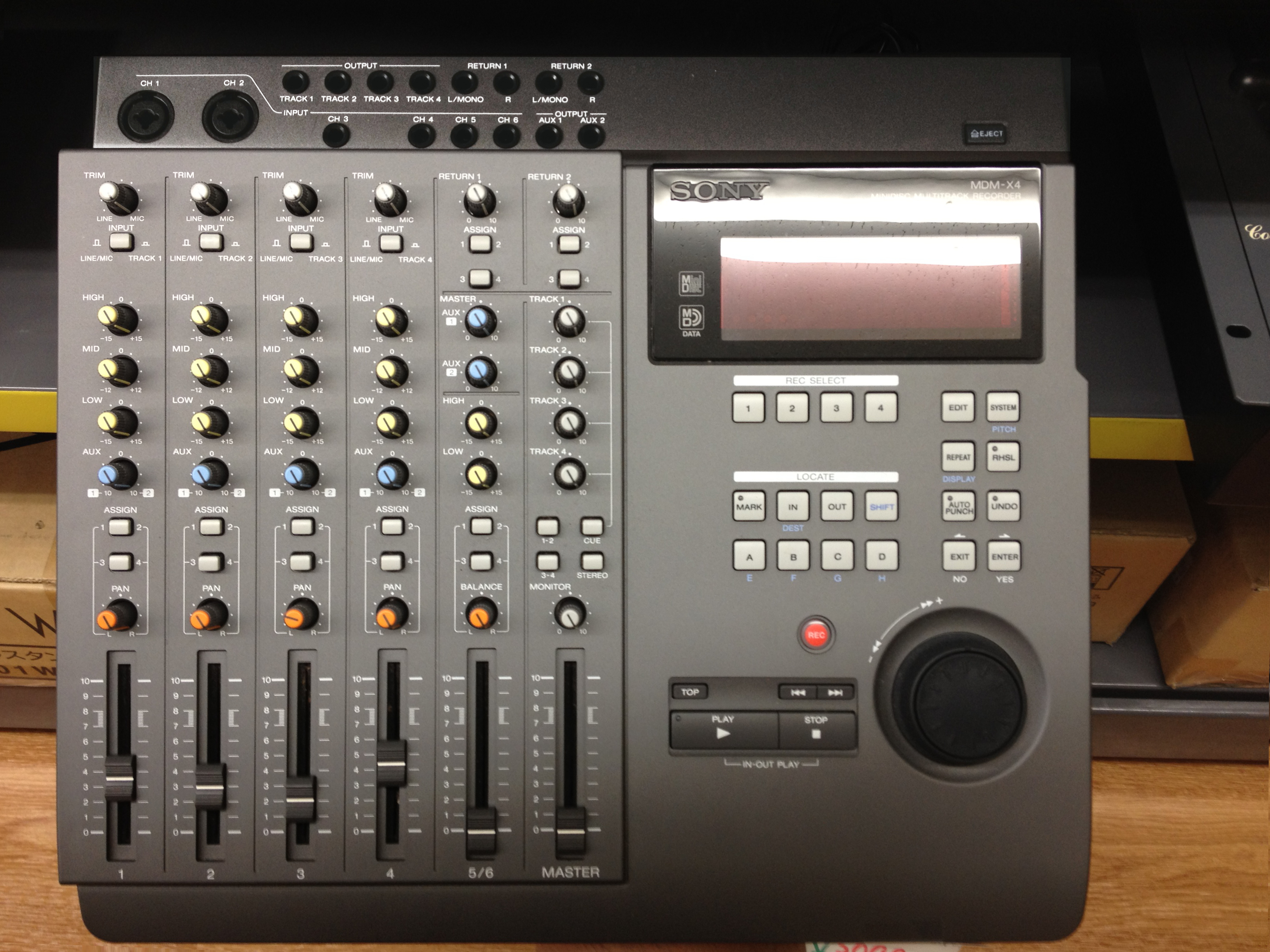
Sony MDM-X4

All of the equipment used to record the album

The album was recorded on 14 June 1999 at "The Abbey, London", actually the home of Haswell's friend. It was recorded two days after the recording of the duo's only other album: the digital-only Live at the Neils Yard Rough Trade Shop London, released in 2000. Two Apple PowerBook laptops equipped with various software were controlled simultaneously to digitally generate sounds, which were then mixed with a Sony MDM-X4 four-track mixer and recorded onto a MiniDisc. (Note: The liner notes only specify the mixer as a "MD Sony four-track", but the MDM-X4 is the only four-track MiniDisc-based mixer Sony ever released.)

== Artwork and packaging ==
Note: Headphone listening at maximum volume is suggested.

— Satanstornade liner notes

The album's artwork is a photo of a store display with various knives, daggers and katanas for sale. Liner notes are written over the image with a clear varnish, which only allows the text to be read when shone under a light.

The vinyl version disc has no labels; track titles are etched directly on the record between audio grooves. This results in all tracks on side B ending in locked grooves, which force the listener to manually move the stylus onto the next track after the previous one has ended. Some critics see this as an attempt to highlight the physicality and limitations of the vinyl format, especially considering the album's digital nature and comparing it against the CD version it was released alongside with.

== Critical reception ==
Professional ratings
Review scores
| Source | Rating |
|---|---|
| Drowned in Sound | 5/5 stars |
| Pitchfork Media | 5.9/10 |
| Uncut | 1.5/5 stars |

Because of Warp Record's relatively mainstream roster, Satanstornade received more attention than the expected for a noise release, which lead to publications such as Uncut and NME covering it. It received mixed reviews. Comic artist and music journalist Edwin Pouncey (a.k.a. Savage Pencil) of The Wire called Satanstornade an "ugly yet totally thrilling express ride to Hell and back, with the devil lurking in the detail"; however, Christopher Weingarten of CMJ New Music Monthly considered it to be "one of the most difficult listens since Lou Reed's Metal Machine Music".

== Track listing ==
=== CD version (WARPCD666) ===
| No. | Title | Length |
|---|---|---|
| 1. | "Fend Off Your Miserable Grief" | 3:00 |
| 2. | "Unlock the Mysteries of the Sun" | 17:23 |
| 3. | "Track 5" | 13:50 |
| 4. | "Testicular Fortitute" | 13:24 |
| Total length: | | 47:37 |

=== Vinyl version (WARPLP666) ===
Side A
| No. | Title | Length |
|---|---|---|
| 1. | "Unlock the Mysteries of the Sun" |

Side B
| No. | Title | Length |
|---|---|---|
| 2. | "Fend Off Your Miserable Grief" |
| 3. | "Testicular Fortitude" (edit) |
| 4. | "Track 5" (edit) |

All tracks on side B end in locked grooves.

== Personnel ==
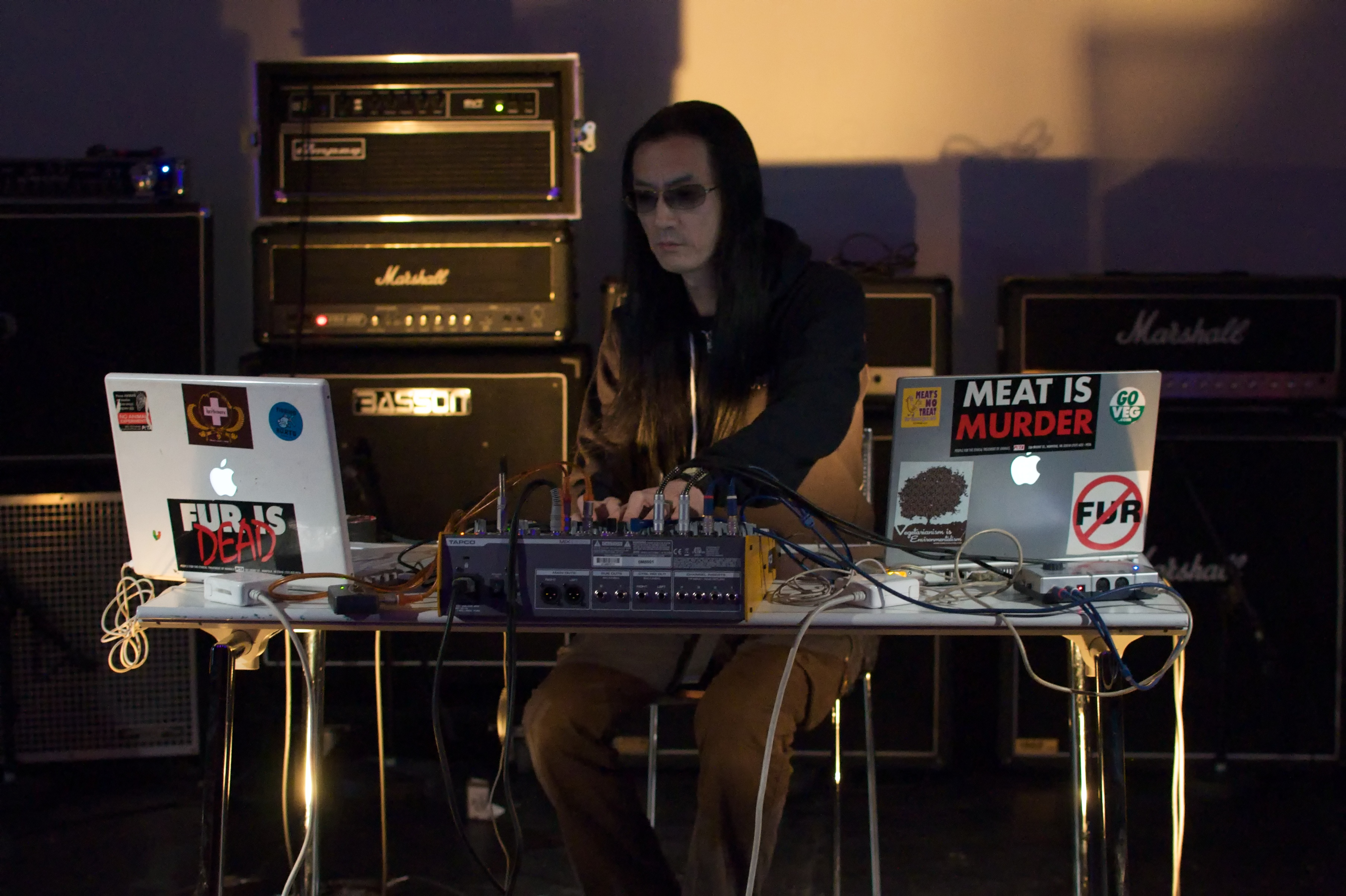
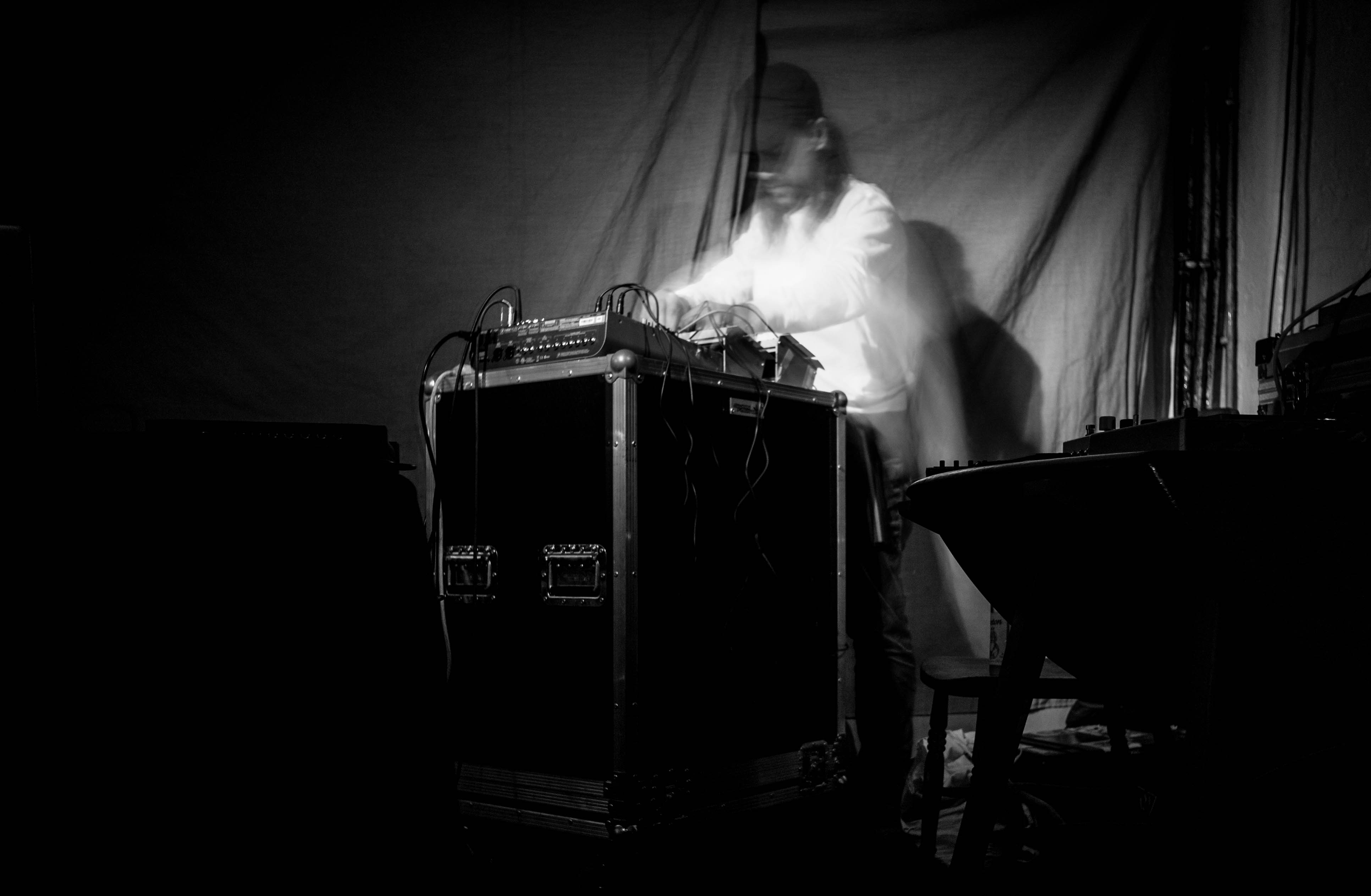
Masami Akita (top) and Russell Haswell (bottom)

=== Satanstornade ===
- Masami Akita – PowerBook G3
- Russell Haswell – PowerBook 1400c

=== Technical personnel ===
- Oswald Berthold – MiniDisc transfer
- Russell Haswell – pre-mastering, editing
- Denis Blackham – digital mastering
- Rashad Becker – vinyl mastering
