= In Stereo (Fenn O'Berg album) =

Studio album by Fenn O'Berg
- Released: 2 March 2010
- Recorded: October 2009
- Studio: Gok Sound (Tokyo, Japan)
- Length: 55:45
- Label: Editions Mego

Fenn O'Berg chronology
Magic & Return (2009)	In Stereo (2010)	Live in Japan (2010)

In Stereo is a studio album by Fenn O'Berg, a project of Christian Fennesz, Jim O'Rourke, and Peter Rehberg. It was released on 2 March 2010 through Editions Mego.

== Background ==
Christian Fennesz, also known under the mononym Fennesz, is an Austrian musician from Vienna. Jim O'Rourke is an American musician from Chicago. Peter Rehberg, also known under the pseudonym Pita, was an Austrian musician from London, England. Fenn O'Berg was their collaborative project. In Stereo is the trio's debut studio album. It was recorded at Gok Sound in Tokyo, Japan, in October 2009. It was released on 2 March 2010 through Editions Mego.

== Critical reception ==
Professional ratings
Review scores
Source	Rating
Cokemachineglow	74%
Pitchfork	6.5/10
Spectrum Culture	2.5/5

Ben Ratliff of The New York Times called the album "echoey and meditative, slow-developing instead of episodic, forbidding instead of prankish." Spencer Grady of BBC wrote, "Even amid the chaotic axis of the digital storm – which sees Fenn O'Berg casting wildly oscillating electrons down the throat of an alien aqueduct in subatomic defiance of Coulomb's law – there remains the feeling that tones and timbres are being deftly deployed in accordance with some grand scheme."

== Track listing ==
All tracks are written by Christian Fennesz, Jim O'Rourke, and Peter Rehberg.

In Stereo track listing
No.	Title	Length
1.	"Part III"	9:07
2.	"Part IV"	8:18
3.	"Part V"	13:23
4.	"Part I"	7:03
5.	"Part VII"	9:18
6.	"Part VI"	8:21
Total length:		55:45

== Personnel ==
Credits adapted from liner notes.

- Christian Fennesz – performance
- Jim O'Rourke – performance
- Peter Rehberg – performance
- Shunichiro Okada – outside photography
- Ujin Matsuo – inside photography
