= Fsck (album) =

1997 album by Farmers Manual

fsck

Studio album by Farmers Manual
- Released: August 1997
- Genre: Electronica, Glitch
- Length: 1:01:24
- Label: Tray

Farmers Manual chronology
No Backup (1996)	fsck (1997)	Explorers We (1998)

fsck is the second full-length release by Farmers Manual, published in August 1997 on Tray (a sister-label of Ash International). A 2nd edition was reprinted in 1999 on OR (another sister-label of Ash International).

== Album title ==
The album title refers to a command of the Unix operating system, where fsck stands for file system check – a command used by system administrators if there is believed to be a problem with the file system (the term's tongue-in-cheek use among the hacker subculture is referenced in the Jargon File). Nevertheless, some critics took the title as a misspelling.

== Reception ==
Professional ratings
Review scores
Source	Rating
Allmusic	4/5 stars
Vital Weekly	(favorable)

Fsck was hailed as an "abstract genre abuse", and compared to acts as Pan Sonic, Merzbow or Photek. The album was included in the "top 50 albums of 1997" by British music magazine The Wire.

In 2021, in Pitchforks "Favorite Albums of the Last 25 Years" anniversary feature, Fennesz names Fsck as the only album that "actually influenced" him. "Their punky attitude was something new and fresh for computer music. fsck sounds to my ears like free-jazz-computer-techno—nobody else was attempting this at that time".

== Track listing ==
1. "363" – 5:05
2. "364" – 1:18
3. "365" – 3:51
4. "366" – 3:58
5. "367 mix" – 1:57
6. "368 mix" – 4:57
7. "369 fin" – 3:58
8. "370 magic leise mix" – 10:15
9. "Nuk (mix)" – 1:26
10. "371 adv3" – 1:05
11. "Frog dies in sunlight.aif" – 3:16
12. "I out" – 1:39
13. "Klopp01.proc (mono)" – 0:56
14. "Loop der.II.proc" – 1:29
15. "Untitled" – 5:37

16–98. "Inter #001 (Mono)" – "Inter #043 (Mono)" – 0:04
99. "Myself ii" – 5:05

== Notes ==
Track 16 to 98 all have a duration of 4 seconds, and contain nothing but silence, interspersed with occasional digital static. The band's interest in pushing the limits of any given medium will also appear on the subsequent releases, Explorers_We and RLA.
