= Get In =

Get In may refer to:

- Get In (Kenickie album), 1998
- Get In (Pita album), 2016
- Get In (film), 2019

== See also ==
- "Get Inside", 2002 nu metal song by Stone Sour
