= UPIC =

Musical composition tool

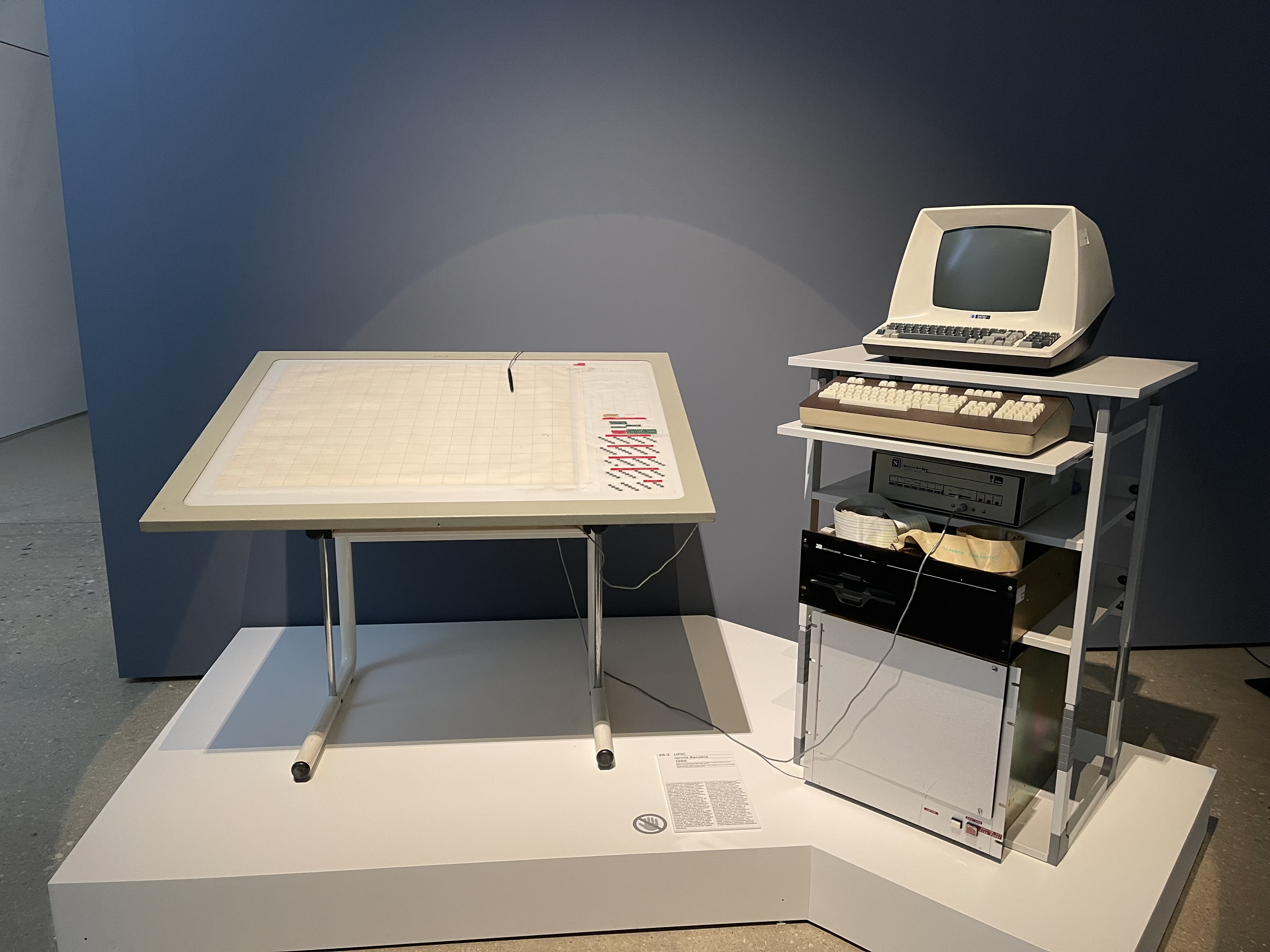
- Greek UPIC, inaugurated in 1986
- Dates: 1977

Technical specifications

Input/output

UPIC (Unité Polyagogique Informatique CEMAMu) is a computerised musical composition tool, devised by the composer Iannis Xenakis. It was developed at the Centre d'Etudes de Mathématique et Automatique Musicales (CEMAMu) in Paris, and was completed in 1977. Xenakis used it on his subsequent piece Mycènes Alpha (1978) and two other works. It has also been used by composers such as Julio Estrada, (Eua´on (1980)), Jean-Claude Risset (on Saxatile (1992)), Jorge Antunes (Interlude de l'opéra Olga (1992)), François-Bernard Mâche (Hypérion (1981), Nocturne (1981), Tithon (1989), Moires (1994), Canopée (2003)), Zbigniew Karkowski (Uexkull (1991), Immortals By My Side (1992)),Takehito Shimazu (Illusions in Desolate Fields (1994)), Gérard Pape (Le Fleuve du Désir III (1994)), Curtis Roads (Purity (1994), Sonal Atoms (1998)), Florian Hecker and Russell Haswell (Blackest Ever Black, 2007). Aphex Twin implies that he uses UPIC in an interview where he is asked what software he uses and he replies that, "UPIC by Xenakis puts almost everything else to shame [and] it's under 1mb".

Physically, the UPIC is a digitising tablet linked to a computer, which has a vector display. Its functionality is similar to that of the later Fairlight CMI, in that the user draws waveforms and volume envelopes on the tablet, which are rendered by the computer. Once the waveforms have been stored, the user can compose with them by drawing compositions on the tablet, with the X-axis representing time, and the Y-axis representing pitch. The compositions can be stretched in duration from a few seconds to an hour. They can also be transposed, reversed, inverted, and subject to a number of algorithmic transformations. The system allows for real time performance by moving the stylus across the tablet.

The UPIC system has subsequently been expanded to allow for digitally sampled waveforms as source material, rather than purely synthesised tones. In 2005, Mode Records of New York released a 2-CD compilation of works composed with the UPIC at CCMIX, entitled Xenakis, UPIC, Continuum, which provides an overview of the machine's sonic possibilities.

There were a couple of attempts to reproduce the UPIC system using commodity hardware, for instance Iannix, HighC, UPISketch. IanniX, which has been sponsored by the French Ministry of Culture, is a graphical open-source sequencer which syncs via Open Sound Control events and curves to a real-time environment (like Pure Data, SuperCollider, Csound, MaxMSP and openFrameworks among others). For its part, HighC is currently used as a pedagogical tool in classes ranging from early teens to Master classes in composition, while some contemporary composers, such as George Hatzimichelakis have made it part of their toolset.

Another pedagogical tool, UPISketch, was inspired by the UPIC. The first version, released in 2018, runs on OSX and iOS. It was made possible thanks to a partnership between the Centre Iannis Xenakis and the European University of Cyprus, with funding from the Interfaces Project.
