= KTL (band) =

Musical project

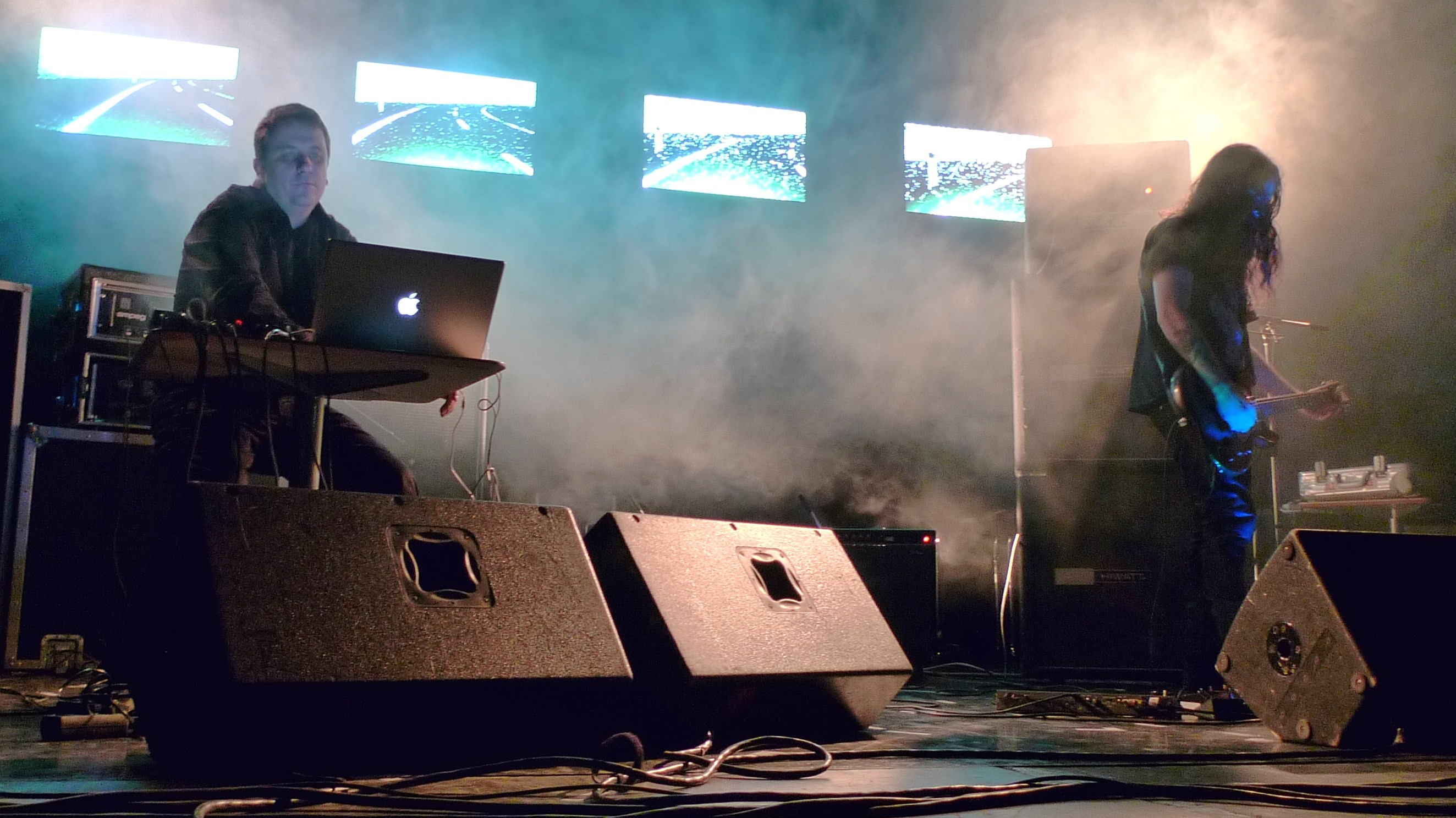

Background information
- Genres: Drone metal Dark ambient Noise
- Years active: 2006–2021
- Labels: Editions Mego; Thrill Jockey
- Members: Stephen O'Malley; Peter Rehberg
- Website: myspace.com/ktlrule

KTL was an American-Austrian musical project consisting of Stephen O'Malley (Sunn O)))) and Peter Rehberg (Pita), originally formed to create the music for a theater production titled Kindertotenlieder by Gisèle Vienne and Dennis Cooper. The production premiered in Brest, France, in March 2007.

The duo has also played shows not associated with the Kindertotenlieder production.

In late 2008, it was announced on Stephen O'Malley's web site that KTL's fourth album would be released in January 2009 through Editions Mego and in February 2009 through Daymare Records, with a vinyl release on Inoxia. In addition to the announcement, two song titles were mentioned for the upcoming album — "Paratrooper" and "Natural Trouble".

== Discography ==
- KTL (CD/2XLP) (Editions Mego/Aurora Borealis)
- KTL 2 (CD/2XLP) (Editions Mego/Thrill Jockey)
- KTL 3 EP (Or Records)
- Eine eiserne Faust in einem Samthandschuh CD (Editions Mego) - limited to 300 copies and was sold on tour in 2007. "Luminaire" was recorded at Luminaire in Kilburn, London, on 29 May 2007. "Forest Floor" (from KTL's first album) was remixed by Florian for this release. The title is German and translates to "An iron fist in a velvet glove".
- The Phantom Carriage: KTL Edition DVD (Tartan)
- Live in Krems EP (Editions Mego)
- IKKI CD (Editions Mego)
- KTL IV CD (Editions Mego/Forced Exposure)
- The Paris Demos (Editions Mego)
- KTL V (CD/2XLP) (Editions Mego)
