= Relief (Kevin Drumm album) =

Studio album by Kevin Drumm
- Released: November 5, 2012
- Recorded: 2012
- Studio: Worse Than Burning Offal
- Genre: Noise
- Length: 36:51
- Label: Editions Mego

Kevin Drumm chronology
| Imperial Horizon (2009) | Relief (2012) | Crowded (2012) |

Relief is a studio album by American experimental musician Kevin Drumm. It was released on November 5, 2012, through Editions Mego. It received generally favorable reviews from critics.

== Background ==
Kevin Drumm is an American experimental musician based in Chicago, Illinois. Relief consists of a single 36-minute track. It was recorded in 2012 at Worse Than Burning Offal. It was released on November 5, 2012, through Editions Mego.

60 Minute Relief, an extended 60-minute version of the album, was released on March 5, 2015.

== Critical reception ==
Professional ratings
Aggregate scores
| Source | Rating |
|---|---|
| Metacritic | 78/100 |
Review scores
| Source | Rating |
| Pitchfork | 7.7/10 |
| PopMatters | 7/10 |
| Tiny Mix Tapes | 3/5 stars |

According to the review aggregator Metacritic, Relief received "generally favorable reviews" based on a weighted average score of 78 out of 100 from 5 critic scores.

Craig Hayes of PopMatters stated, "Relief is a barrage of noise, but there's also a great deal of conspicuous forethought and nuance in that battering." Brian Howe of Pitchfork wrote, "even during its most violent passages, Relief is more entrancing than overwhelming, at least after you sink through its abrasive exterior and get used to its lulling depths." Meanwhile, Matthew Phillips of Tiny Mix Tapes commented that "Any abstraction from the immediacy of the texture threatens to disrupt the listening experience, and while the conceptual layer of Relief certainly enriches the work, it prevents full immersion."

== Track listing ==
Relief track listing
| No. | Title | Length |
|---|---|---|
| 1. | "Relief" | 36:51 |

60 Minute Relief track listing
| No. | Title | Length |
|---|---|---|
| 1. | "60 Minute Relief" | 59:05 |

== Personnel ==
Credits adapted from liner notes.

- Kevin Drumm
- Chris Goudreau – mastering
