= CCMIX =

Research institute for contemporary music

CCMIX (Center for the Composition of Music Iannis Xenakis, 2000), formerly Les Ateliers UPIC [UPIC workshops], CEMAMu (Centre d'Etudes de Mathématique et Automatique Musicales, 1972), and EMAMu (Equipe de Mathématique et Automatique Musicales), was a research institute and a center for contemporary music. It was established by composer Iannis Xenakis with the support of the French Ministry of Culture in 1966 to encourage interdisciplinary research between arts and sciences. The center is best known for producing UPIC (Unité Polyagogique Informatique CEMAMu, 1977).

== History ==
Following an audit by the French Ministry of Culture in late 2006, CCMIX was reorganized as the Centre Iannis Xenakis (CIX) with a narrower focus on the safeguarding, development, and dissemination of the intellectual heritage of the work of Iannis Xenakis. Since December 2010, it has been located at the University of Rouen.

== See also ==
- Cloud generator
- Kyma (sound design language)
