= Fenn O'Berg =

Experimental electronic supergroup

- Genres: Computer music; experimental
- Years active: 1997–2021 (sporadically)
- Label: Editions Mego
- Past members: Christian Fennesz; Jim O'Rourke; Peter Rehberg

Fenn O'Berg was an improvisational computer music trio made up of members Christian Fennesz, Jim O'Rourke, and Peter Rehberg.

== History ==
Their existence began with a surprise appearance at the Nickelsdorf Festival in 1997. This was followed by extensive international touring in 1998–1999, bringing a live stage setup consisting solely of portable computing devices to venues which would not usually have booked such shows at that time.

The cover art for their first two albums is provided by Chicks on Speed.

The song "Floating My Boat" features a sample from Neil Young's "Expecting to Fly," which was orchestrated by famed producer Jack Nitzsche. Band member Jim O'Rourke has stated in interviews that he greatly enjoys Nitzsche's production work.

The trio released The Magic Sound of Fenn O'Berg (1999), The Return of Fenn O'Berg (2002), Magic & Return (2009), In Stereo (2010), Live in Japan (2010), and In Hell (2012).

== Discography ==
=== Studio albums ===
- In Stereo (2010)

=== Live albums ===
- The Magic Sound of Fenn O'Berg (1999)
- The Return of Fenn O'Berg (2002)
- Live in Japan (2010)
- In Hell (2012)

=== Compilation albums ===
- Magic & Return (2009)
