= Derek Piotr =

- Derek Piotr taking fieldnotes while recording a traditional singer.

Background information
- Genres: Folk; Experimental; Electronica; Electroacoustic; Glitch
- Occupations: Folklorist, vocalist, composer
- Instruments: Vocals, electronics
- Years active: 2011–present
- Labels: LINE Imprint; Trente Oiseaux; MonotypeRecords; DPSR important drone records
- Website: www.derekpiotr.com

Derek Piotr is a folklorist, vocalist, and composer.

== Career ==
Piotr released the album Agora in 2011. In 2012 his work was nominated for Prix Ars Electronica.

In 2016, Piotr released the glitch album Drono. Forest People Pop was released in 2017.

His 2018 album Grunt was completed in collaboration with Kevin Drumm. "Grunt" is the Polish word for "earth" or "dirt". The album received mostly positive reviews, with PopMatters describing the material as being "equipped with all of the hypnotic powers of its contemporaries" and Cyclic Defrost calling it "intricately constructed and frequently jarring".

He released the remix EPs Earth Edit and Underlined in 2018, followed by Repeating Bloom in January 2019. He released the album Avia in July 2019.

At the end of 2019, Piotr began researching Appalachian folk music for a new solo album. Through these folklore studies he discovered singer Lena Bare Turbyfill, whose last living daughter he tracked down and recorded in July 2020.

He released his first folk single "Invisible Map" on January 1, 2021. "Invisible Map"'s B-side is a rendition of the folk tune "Barbry Allen". In 2021, Piotr released Making and Then Unmaking, his tenth studio album, which was heavily influenced by his time spent in Appalachia.

== Personal life ==
Piotr sang in John Read Middle School’s choir and studied music theory and music appreciation at Joel Barlow High School. Growing up in the woods of Redding, Connecticut, Piotr is a longtime outdoor enthusiast and draws inspiration from nature.

Piotr is openly queer, stating, "I don’t want to rest on the privilege of assumption that I am a straight white male. I want to be truthful to where I’m coming from so I don’t get a free pass."
