= Seven Tons for Free =

1996 studio album by Peter Rehberg

Seven Tons For Free

Studio album by Pita
- Released: June 1996
- Genre: Experimental music; Industrial music; Glitch (music)
- Length: 31:06
- Label: Mego (MEGO 009)

Pita chronology
Seven Tons For Free (1996)	Get Out (1999)

Seven Tons For Free is the first solo album by English electronic musician Peter Rehberg, under his stage name Pita. It was released on Austrian music label Mego in June 1996. This record follows the 12" EP Fridge Trax, which was a collaboration between Pita and General Magic.

== Music ==
Very short in length (just over 30 minutes), this seven-track album features a sound devoid of the rhythms, melodies, and atmospheres typically found in techno or ambient music.

== Packaging ==
The album cover was designed by Tina Frank, who would go on to create the visuals for many of the Mego label's releases over the following years.

== Critical reception ==
In 1999, Seven Tons For Free was awarded the Prix Ars Electronica (Digital Musics category). Jury member Atsushi Sasaki described the album as "a monumental piece which was decisive in the direction that mego took as a label thereafter," comparing it to Pan Sonic's Vakio and Ryoji Ikeda's +/- albums.

More than 20 years after its release, Oliver Lamm described the album as "a masterpiece of nocturnal and introspective industrial music."

== Track listing ==
No.	Title	Length
1.	"i"	1:02
2.	"~ /"	6:29
3.	"ii"	1:02
4.	"Boiler"	5:34
5.	"iii"	1:02
6.	"Fehler"	1:35
7.	"Seven Tons Revised"	14:23
Total length:		31:06
