= HighC =

Musical composition tool

HighC is a graphical musical composition tool inspired from UPIC, and developed by Thomas Baudel between 1991 and 2015. First released in 2007 as a commercial product, it has been used by numerous composers inspired by Iannis Xenakis, such as George Hatzimichelakis and Dimitri Sykias.

It has also been used for educational purposes in music schools, in Spain, France and Greece.
