= Fridge Trax =

1995 EP by General Magic and Pita

EP by General Magic & Pita
- Released: May 1995
- Genre: Experimental music; Intelligent dance music
- Length: 28:23
- Label: Mego (MEGO 001)

Pita chronology
Fridge Trax (1995)	Seven Tons for Free (1996)

General Magic chronology
Fridge Trax (1995)	Die Mondlandung (1995)

Fridge Trax Plus
- Cover of the Fridge Trax Plus release in 2015

Fridge Trax is a 12" EP of electronic and experimental music created from recordings of refrigerators by General Magic (Ramon Bauer and Andi Pieper) and Pita (Peter Rehberg). It was the first release on the Mego label (MEGO 001). It was followed by the album-length Live and Final Fridge, released on Source Records. In 2015, both releases were reissued under the combined title Fridge Trax Plus.

== Background ==
=== Recording of Fridge Trax ===
In 1994, Bauer, Pieper and Rehberg had the idea of creating music from recordings of refrigerators. After collecting enough recordings by placing microphones in refrigerators of various sizes, they traveled to Berlin. There, in Andi Pieper's studio, the four tracks of Fridge Trax were composed in a single session in October 1994. The Mego label was created in order to release these recordings. The cover art for Fridge Trax was created by Tina Frank, who went on to design the visuals for many of Mego's releases over the following years.

In June 1995, a delegation from the Mego label consisting of Rehberg, Bauer, and Tina Frank attended the Sónar festival in Barcelona to promote the label's first three records, which were presented in pizza boxes.

=== Recording of Live and Final Fridge ===
On July 10 1995, at the Interference festival held as part of Berlin's Love Parade, the trio performed their Fridge Trax live during a session played between 6 and 7 a.m. The first six tracks on Live and Final Fridge are from this performance. Three further tracks were recorded in September 1995 in Berlin (Thaw Fridge), and finally in October 1995 in Vienna (Raw Fridge and Final Fridge). The album Live and Final Fridge was released in 1996 on the German label Source Records.

Following these collaborations, the musicians soon released their first solo albums: Pita's Seven Tons for Free (1996), and General Magic's Frantz (1997).

== Critical reception ==
=== Fridge Trax ===
In his review for AllMusic, Sean Cooper describes the EP Fridge Trax as a fascinating record: "The range of sounds Pita and General Magic are able to extract from such seemingly unmusical sources is nothing short of phenomenal, from blunt, funky breakbeats and warbling basslines to weird, shivery drones and echoing atmospherics." Florian Hecker describes Fridge Trax in Artforum as "an ultralightweight construction—focused, clear, conceptual, rhythmic but static, witty, and utterly new."

=== Live and Final Fridge ===
Regarding the Live and Final Fridge album, Cooper considers it "even better produced and with an overall tighter, more composed feel," noting the diversity of sounds. Oliver Lamm described the album as "a true manifesto (...) which would serve as a blueprint for Peter Rehberg's entire career." For Oli Warwick, the track Spring Fridge, with its rich sound palette, is one of the album's standout tracks.

== Further releases ==
In 2007, a digital reissue of Fridge Trax was released by Editions Mego.

In 2015, a new edition entitled Fridge Trax Plus was announced to mark the 20th anniversary of the original release. Fridge Trax Plus combines all the tracks from the Fridge Trax EP and the Live and Final Fridge album, which have been remastered. A new cover was designed, once again by Tina Frank. Fridge Trax Plus was released on May 25, 2015, on double vinyl (with all 13 tracks) and digitally.

== Track listing ==
=== Fridge Trax (12") ===
No.	Title	Length
1.	"Deep Fridge"	14:53
2.	"Dope Fridge"	4:18
3.	"Funk Fridge"	7:21
4.	"Theme Fridge"	1:51
Total length:		28:23

=== Live and Final Fridge (CD) ===
No.	Title	Length
1.	"Spring Fridge"	6:05
2.	"Deeper Fridge"	1:43
3.	"Shuffle Fridge"	3:35
4.	"Phunk Fridge"	9:18
5.	"Cool Fridge"	3:45
6.	"Ding Fridge"	4:53
7.	"Thaw Fridge"	3:52
8.	"Raw Fridge"	5:06
9.	"Final Fridge"	16:20
Total length:		54:36
