= Kevin Drumm =

American musician

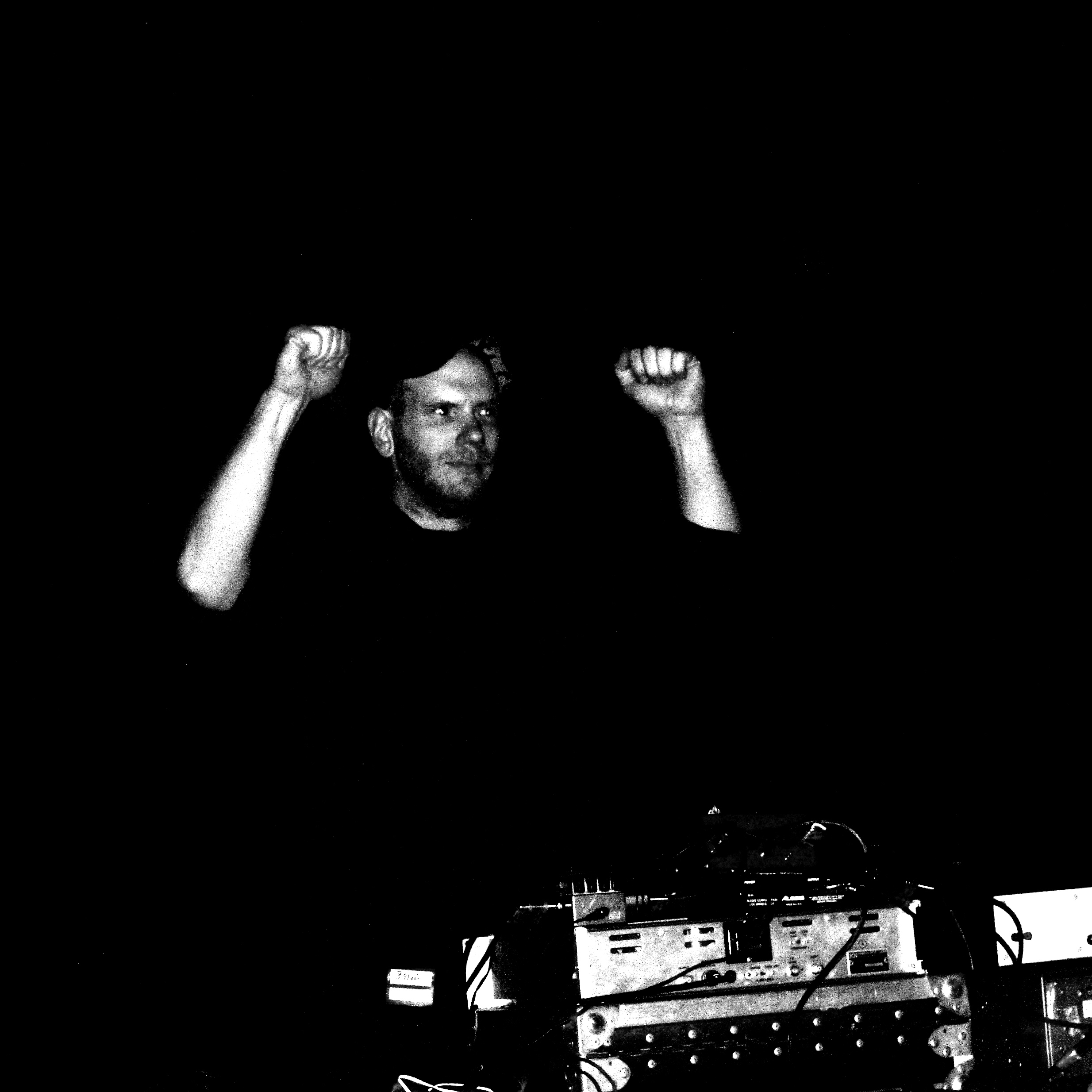
- Kevin Drumm live in 2009

Background information
- Born: 1970 (age 55–56); South Holland, Illinois, U.S.
- Origin: Chicago, Illinois, U.S.
- Genres: Experimental; noise; free improvisation; electroacoustic
- Occupation: musician
- Instruments: guitar, electronics
- Labels: Mego; Erstwhile; Kitty Play

Kevin Drumm (born 1970) is an experimental musician based in Chicago, United States.

== Biography ==
Emerging from the city's improvised music scene, in the 1990s he became one of the world's pre-eminent prepared guitar players. Since then his work has expanded to include electroacoustic compositions and live electronic music made with laptop computers and analog modular synthesizers. His early recordings contain mostly sparse, quiet sounds; recent works have been more loud and dense.

Drumm has collaborated with many artists working in similar fields, including Japanese guitarist Taku Sugimoto, multi-instrumentalist and producer Jim O'Rourke, and many European improvisers such as Swedish saxophonist Mats Gustafsson and German trumpeter Axel Dörner. He has also worked with the artist group Simparch, composing a piece for their installation Spec, shown at Documenta XI in Kassel, Germany and at the Renaissance Society in Chicago. Drumm has also worked with saxophonist Ken Vandermark's Territory Band, which brings together American and European players who work in both jazz and free improvisation. Drumm has received a Foundation for Contemporary Arts Grants to Artists award (2011).

== Discography ==
=== Releases ===
- (1997) Kevin Drumm (CD) - Perdition Plastics
- (1999) Second (CD) - Perdition Plastics
- (2000) Comedy (CD) - Moikai
- (2000) Particles and Smears with Martin Tétreault (CD) - Erstwhile Records
- (2000) Kevin Drumm / Bhob Rainey Split (12") - Fringes
- (2001) KD (Cassette) - Freedom From
- (2001) Cases with Ralf Wehowsky (CD) - Selektion
- (2001) Den with Taku Sugimoto (CD) - Sonoris
- (2001) Triangles with Leif Elggren (LP/CD) - Moikai
- (2001) Untitled (Erstwhile 015) with Axel Dörner (CD) - Erstwhile Records
- (2001) Kevin Drumm / Pita Split (12") - BOXmedia
- (2002) DEG with Leif Elggren and Mats Gustafsson (LP) - Firework Edition Records
- (2002) Frozen by Blizzard Winds with Lasse Marhaug (CD) - Smalltown Supersound
- (2002) Sheer Hellish Miasma (CD) - Mego
- (2002) I Drink Your Skin with Aaron Dilloway (Cassette) - Hanson Records
- (2003) Eruption with Fred Lonberg-Holm and Weasel Walter (CD) - Grob
- (2003) Land of Lurches (LP/CD) - Hanson Records
- (2003) Mort Aux Vaches with Dan Burke (CD) - Staalplaat
- (2004) Impish Tyrant (Cassette) - Spite
- (2005) Horror of Birth (Cassette) - Chondritic Sound
- (2005) Kevin Drumm / 2673 Split (LP) - Kitty Play Records
- (2007) Sheer Hellish Miasma reissue (CD) - Editions Mego
- (2007) All Are Guests in the House of the Lord with Prurient - Hospital Productions
- (2007) Purge (Cassette) - iDEAL
- (2007) Gauntlet with Daniel Menche (CD) - Editions Mego
- (2008) Snow (Cassette) - Hospital Productions
- (2008) Imperial Distortion (2CD) - Hospital Productions
- (2008) untiled (LP) - Dilemma Records
- (2009) Malaise (Cassette) - Hospital Productions
- (2009) Alku Tape (Cassette) - Alku
- (2009) Imperial Horizon - Hospital Productions
- (2010) The Icy Echoer (7") with Michael Esposito - Fragment Factory
- (2010) Necro Acoustic (5 cd boxed set) - PicaDisk
- (2012) Relief (LP) - Editions Mego
- (2012) Crowded (LP) - Bocian Records
- (2013) Tannenbaum (CD/Cassette) - Hospital Productions
- (2013) Earrach (CDr) - Selfreleased
- (2014) The Abyss with Jason Lescalleet (2CD) - Erstwhile Records
- (2017) Interference (Cassette) - Second Editions
- (2017) RECLINE(116 Minute EP)
- (2017) APRIL
- (2017) May(Part 1)
- (2017) May(Part 2)
- (2017) June (CDr)
- (2017) The Loop (2xLP/CD)
- (2017) Fortification Spectrum
- (2017) The Illusion Of Having Plans (CDr)
- (2017) Live Last Week (CDr)
- (2017) Accelerate (Cassette)
- (2017) Less Than Half As Loud
- (2017) October(Early Warning)
- (2017) The Next World Is Better (7") - Chondritic Sound records
- (2017) Another Set Of Days Now Over
- (2018) Frozen Pipes
- (2018) The March Flog
- (2018) Final Protracted Spillings(Vol.?)
- (2018) May 18
- (2018) Blocking
- (2018) June Spill
- (2018) Horizontal (2CD)
- (2018) Well There You Go! (CD)
- (2018) Overstaying
- (2018) Another Odyssey Of Waiting
- (2018) THE GAS BILL EP
- (2018) Sunday
- (2025) Sheer Hellish Miasma II (CD) - Erstwhile Records

=== Appears on ===
- (1995) Ken Vandermark - Standards (CD) - Quinnah
- (1996) Gastr del Sol - "Our Exquisite Replica of Eternity" on Upgrade & Afterlife (CD) - Drag City
- (1998) Loren Mazzacane-Connors and Alan Licht - Hoffman Estates (CD) - Drag City
- (1999) "Berlin 1", "Graz 2", "Wien 1", "Berlin 3" on Charhizma 002 feat. Dafeldecker/Kurzmann/Fennesz/O'Rourke/Drumm/Siewert (CD) - Charhizma
- (2002) Territory Band-2 Atlas (CD) - OkkaDisk
- (2003) "Wels", "Nickelsdorf 1", "Nickelsdorf 2" on Charhizma 020 feat. Dafeldecker/Kurzmann/Drumm/eRikm/dieb13/Noetinger (CD) - Charhizma
- (2003) "Untitled" on Untitled (CDr) - No label
- (2004) Territory Band-3 Map Theory (2CD) - OkkaDisk

=== Tracks appear on ===
- (1997) "Brassy" on Scatter (CD) - Ash International
- (2000) "Three" on Prix Ars Electronica CyberArts 2000 (2xCD) - Ars Electronica Center
- (2000) "Untitled" on Variious (2xCD) - Intransitive Recordings
- (2001) "Feelin Hilarious" on Or Some Computer Music (CD) - Or Records
- (2001) "Untitled" on Transmissions 003 (2xCD) - Transmissions
- (2002) "My Tree Bears No Nuts (Part 2)" on All Tomorrow's Parties 1.1 (CD/2xLP) - ATP Recordings
- (2001) "Untitled" on X + Y = XY (CDr) - Alku
- (2004) "Untitled" on LDS Relationchips (CDr) - Entr'acte
- (2005) "Untitled" on ALKUjiggerypokeryMIX (MP3) - Alku
- (2018) "Redirect" on Grunt by Derek Piotr (CD) - DPSR
