= Get In (Pita album) =

Studio album by Pita
- Released: 14 May 2016
- Recorded: March 2015–January 2016
- Studio: Twisted (Wien)
- Length: 40:58
- Label: Editions Mego

Pita chronology
Get Off (2004)	Get In (2016)	Get On (2019)

Get In is a studio album by Austrian electronic musician Peter Rehberg under the pseudonym Pita. It was released on 14 May 2016 through Editions Mego. It received generally favorable reviews from critics.

== Background ==
Peter Rehberg was an Austrian electronic musician. Under the pseudonym Pita, he released Get Out (1999), Get Down (2002), and Get Off (2004). Get In was recorded from March 2015 to January 2016. It was released on 14 May 2016 through Editions Mego.

== Critical reception ==
Professional ratings
Aggregate scores
Source	Rating
Metacritic	73/100
Review scores
Source	Rating
AllMusic	3.5/5 stars
Pitchfork	7.2/10
Resident Advisor	3.8/5

According to the review aggregator Metacritic, Get In received "generally favorable reviews" based on a weighted average score of 73 out of 100 from 5 critic scores.

Paul Simpson of AllMusic stated, "The album is notably less harsh than previous Pita releases, going for more of a cosmic ambient space than Rehberg is typically known for." He added, "Get In finds Rehberg stretching the Pita sound into more graceful territory, but he hasn't lost his flair for the unexpected that made his work during the '90s and 2000s so visionary." Aaron Leitko of Pitchfork wrote, "it sounds like it could have been made at any time over the intervening decade." He commented that "The sounds are proto-human, primeval and timeless."

== Track listing ==
Get In track listing
No.	Title	Length
1.	"Fvo"	2:44
2.	"20150609 I"	2:52
3.	"Aahn"	7:16
4.	"Line Angel"	7:33
5.	"S200729"	6:14
6.	"9U2016"	4:13
7.	"Mfbk"	10:09
Total length:		40:58

== Personnel ==
Credits adapted from liner notes.

- Peter Rehberg – recording, mixing
- Rashad Becker – mastering
- Tina Frank – artwork
