= No Backup =

Studio album by Farmers Manual
- Released: May 1996
- Genre: Glitch
- Length: 51:58
- Label: Mego

Farmers Manual chronology
No Backup (1996)	Fsck (1997)

Professional ratings
Review scores
Source	Rating
Allmusic	4/5 stars

No Backup, released in May 1996, is the first album by Farmers Manual. A remastered 2nd edition was reprinted in August 1999.

== Track listing ==
1. "Macro Woeb" - 5:54
2. "Biomagic I" - 6:45
3. "Biomagic II" - 7:19
4. "Perimeter 87" - 9:38
5. "Nomad 137" - 7:51
6. "Farmers Manual" - 5:59
7. "Flight III" - 6:14
8. "Take" - 2:18

== Notes ==
The album contains a CD-ROM part, consisting in 120 MB of interactive graphics (playable on Mac OS only).
