= OceanWings =

French maritime technology company

- Type: Private
- Industry: Maritime Technology
- Founded: 2018 in Paris, France
- Founder: Marc Van Peteghem; Nicolas Sdez; Romain Grandsart
- Headquarters: Paris, France
- Products: Rigid wingsails
- Number of employees: 50
- Website: https://www.oceanwings.com/

OceanWings (formerly AYRO) is a French technology company, located in Paris and Caen, which develops and manufactures automated rigid wingsails, a type of wind-assisted propulsion for large oceangoing merchant ships. Marc Van Peteghem, Nicolas Sdez, and Romain Grandsart are its co-founders.

== History ==
A wingsail was originally developed by VPLP Design, led by Marc Van Peteghem and Vincent Lauriot-Prévost, for BMW Oracle Racing Team participating in the 33rd America's Cup in 2010. Since 2008, the boat (USA 17) underwent numerous modifications. In November 2009, its mast collapsed during testing in the Pacific Ocean. The team subsequently replaced the conventional mast with a larger rigid 2-element wingsail designed to be both lightweight and structurally robust. With the new wingsail, the team won the 33rd America's Cup in February 2010. Later, rigid 2-element wingsails became widely adopted in the later Cups.

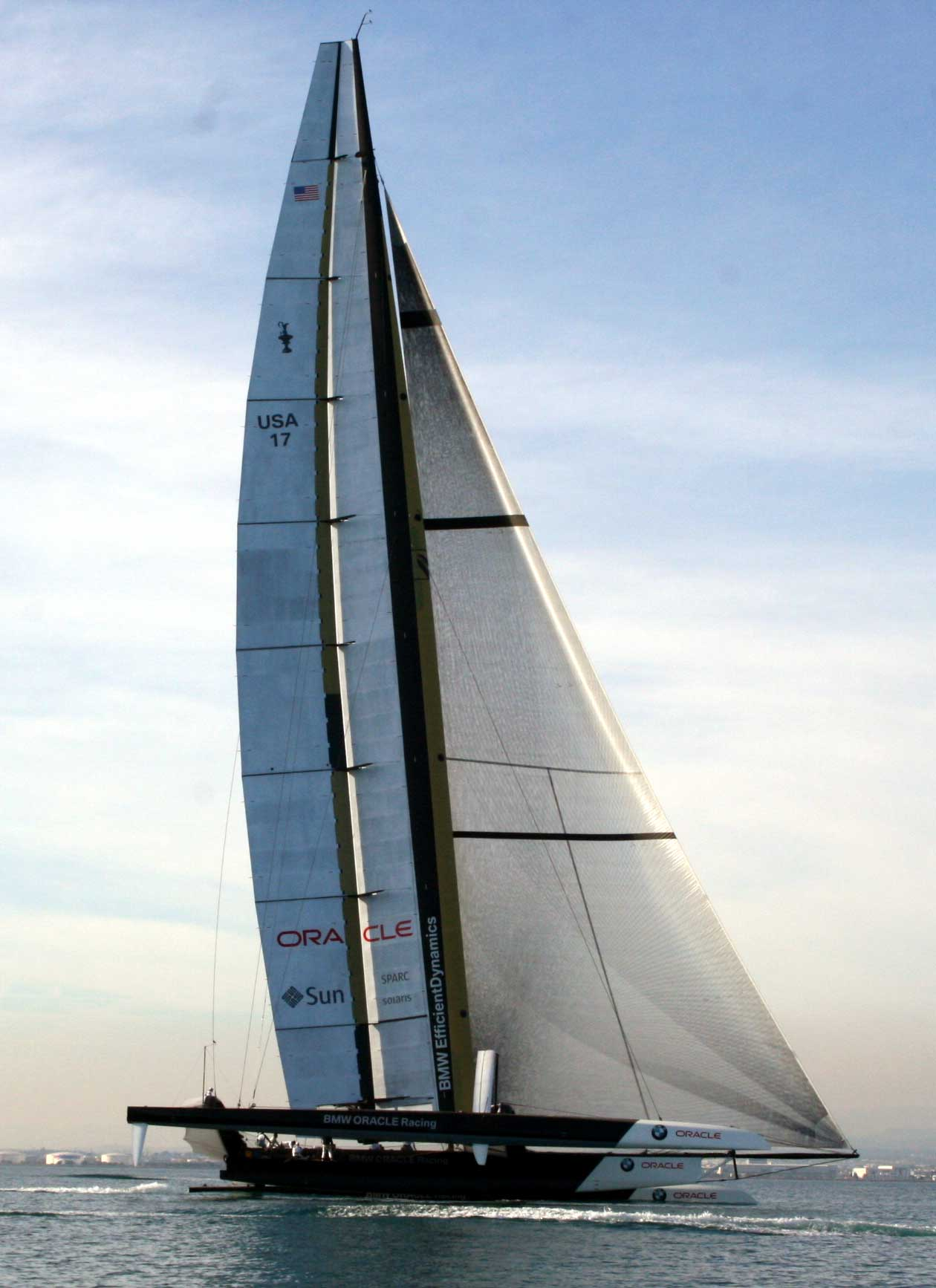
USA 17, which won the 33rd America’s Cup in 2010, designed by VPLP Design.

In 2018, AYRO (the predecessor of OceanWings) was founded to set up a company with appropriate and dedicated funding and expertise to tackle the challenge of designing and manufacturing fully automated wingsails for merchant ships.

In 2019, two OceanWings 32 were manufactured for the Energy Observer catamaran. Powered through a combination of renewable energy sources, including solar and wind power, the Energy Observer became the first ship to reach the Arctic with zero emissions. Since then, the catamaran has completed voyages around the world, including passages through rough sea conditions near the Canary Islands and Spitsbergen, providing operational experience for the OceanWings system and confirming its robustness.

In 2021, AYRO raised €10.5 million in funding from Ocean Zero, Bpifrance, and Mer Invest to support the development and commercial production of its wingsails.

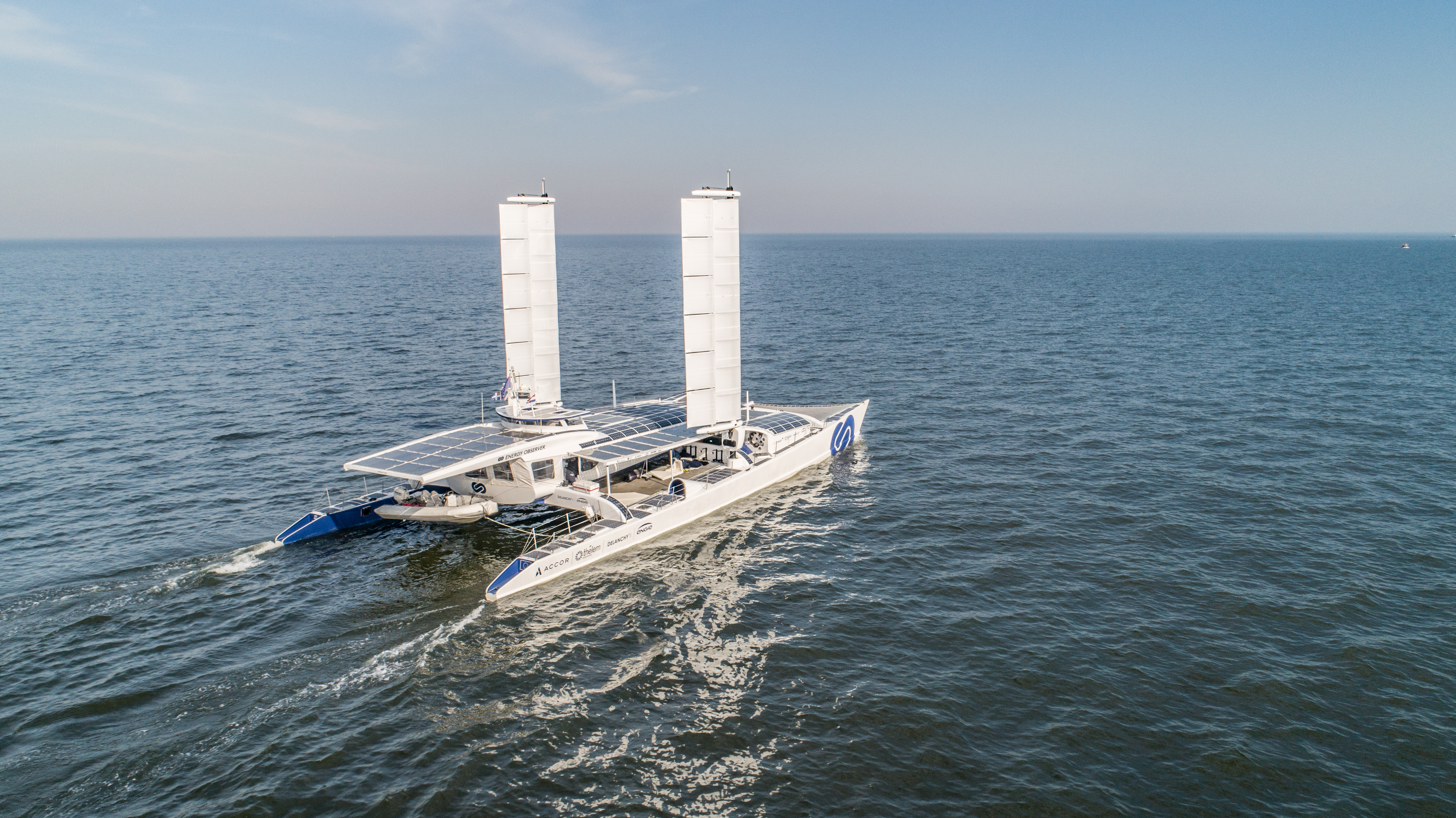
Energy Observer Catamaran, equipped with two OceanWings 32.

In 2023, AYRO installed 33-meter-high wingsails on Canopée, described as the first hybrid industrial newbuild cargo vessel equipped with wind propulsion technology. Operated by Alizée, a joint venture between Zéphyr & Borée and Jifmar Group, the 121-meter vessel was designed to transport components of the Ariane 6 rocket between Europe and French Guiana. In November 2023, Canopée received the Ship of the Year Award. On 26 March 2024, French president Emmanuel Macron visited the vessel during a tour of Europe's Spaceport in French Guiana.

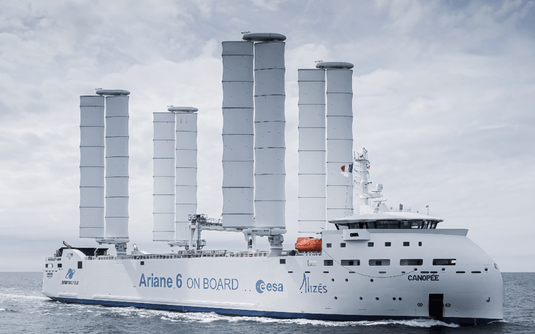
Canopée with 4 lowerable fixed wingsails.

In September 2023, AYRO completed a €19.2 million Series B funding round led by Blue Ocean and managed by SWEN Capital Partners, which brought the total funding to over €30 million for providers of wind-assisted propulsion systems in the maritime sector.

In 2024, AYRO rebranded as OceanWings. According to the company, the rebranding was intended to simplify communications and support the expansion of its wingsail product portfolio. OceanWings introduced additional modular configuration options for its rigid wingsails, including tilt and elevator mechanisms, to meet port operation requirements and optimise cargo handling.

Since 2023, OceanWings has been part of the WHISPER Project, funded by the European Union's Horizon Europe research and innovation programme. WHISPER aims to develop a fully modular retrofit solution combining wind and solar hybrid propulsion technologies to reduce fuel consumption and emissions from maritime transport. OceanWings is one of 14 participating partners.

Maria Topic with one rigid tiltable OceanWings wingsail

As part of the project’s demonstration phase, in August 2026, OceanWings successfully completed the installation of its rigid tiltable 2 element wingsail aboard the Ultramax Bulk carrier Maria Topic owned by the shipowner Topic at Tsuneishi_Shipbuilding in Japan.

== Technology ==
OceanWings' two-element rigid wingsail is a type of wind-assisted propulsion system (WAPS). The standard model has an approximate projected area of 363 m², with a span of 33 m and a chord of 11 m. Airflow accelerates faster on one side, and the resulting larger low-pressure area generates aerodynamic lift (Bernoulli's principle). The geometry of wingsails is similar to that of aircraft wings.

The wingsail is constructed from composite materials, allowing for the manufacture of extremely rigid and lightweight wingsails. Its fatigue resistance contributes to the wingsail's longer service life and enhanced reliability in harsh marine environments.

The modular design of OceanWings' wingsails enables scalability across different vessel types, offering an economically viable and practical retrofitting approach for existing maritime fleets.

The angle of attack of the wingsail is automatically managed by an integrated control system designed for ease of operation.

== Canopée ==
Canopée is a 121-meter roll-on/roll-off cargo vessel with 10,669 GT. It was designed to transport elements of the Ariane 6 rocket from Europe to French Guiana and is equipped with four OceanWings Lowerable Fixed 363 wingsails.

VPLP Design developed the vessel's basic design and hybrid performance prediction, while Neptune Marine, with engineering support from Groot Ship Design, carried out the detailed design and construction. The vessel is owned by Jifmar Guyane and operated commercially by Alizés, a joint venture between Jifmar Offshore Services and Zéphyr & Borée, which also manages the logistics on behalf of ArianeGroup.

In June 2025, operational data released for Canopée reported average fuel savings of approximately 1.3 tonnes per day per wingsail, equivalent to around 300 kilowatts of engine power. The data also reported an average operational availability of 99.6%.

== Certifications ==
- In February 2021, OceanWings (formerly AYRO) obtained Approval in Principle (AiP) from DNV GL, for its OceanWings 3.6.3 wind-assisted propulsion system.
- In March 2024, OceanWings received AiP from ClassNK (Nippon Kaiji Kyokai) in Tokyo, Japan.
- In October 2024, OceanWings was granted AiP by DNV, an international certification society.
- In November 2024, OceanWings received AiP from Bureau Veritas in Athens during the Wind Propulsion Showroom.
- In December 2024, OceanWings received an AiP from American Bureau of Shipping (ABS) for its wind-assisted propulsion system (WAPS).
- In September 2025, OceanWings received a Type Approval Design Certificate (TADC) from DNV. TADC confirms that OceanWings' rigid design meets DNV's safety and operational standards.
- In April 2026, OceanWings secured validation from DNV for its aerodynamic modelling methodology. The methodology is intended to allow operators to assess the impact of wingsail installations on EEDI, EEXI, and FuelEU Maritime requirements at an early stage of project planning.

== Awards ==
- In March 2021, OceanWings (formerly AYRO) received the 2020–2021 "Ocean Innovation Trophy" in the category "shipping decarbonization using wind propulsion," organized by the French bank Banque Populaire Grand Ouest (BPGO).
- In October 2021, OceanWings (formerly AYRO) received the "EVOLEN 2021" Innovation Prize, from EVOLEN — a French association supporting innovative projects and startups since 1998.
- In November 2021, OceanWings (formally AYRO) obtained the Solor Impulse Efficient Solution label, for its green and cost-effective technology.
- In November 2022, OceanWings (formally AYRO) received the Maritime Energy Transition Prize (TEM) from ACADEMIE DE MARINE and SOPER.
- In September 2024, Canopée received the Vessel of the Year Award, during "Maritime Decarbonisation, Europe: Conference, Awards, and Exhibition" in Amsterdam, the Netherlands.
- In February 2026, OceanWings received the Special GICAN Award during the Euromaritime trade show in Marseille, France.
- In June 2026, OceanWings received the Advanced Maritime Technology International Award, in the category of Environmental Achievement of the Year - Propulsion System Design, for the retrofit installation of a rigid wingsail on Maria Topic, an Ultramax bulk carrier.
