= Returnal (album) =

Studio album by Oneohtrix Point Never
- Released: June 22, 2010
- Recorded: July – August 2009, February 2010
- Studio: Ridge Valley Digital, Massachusetts; Brooklyn
- Genre: Electronic; ambient; drone; kosmische; psychedelia; noise
- Length: 41:59
- Label: Editions Mego
- Producer: Daniel Lopatin

Daniel Lopatin albums chronology
Russian Mind (2009)	Returnal (2010)	Chuck Person's Eccojams Vol. 1 (2010)

Singles from Returnal
- 1. "Returnal" Released: August 30, 2010

Returnal is the fourth studio album by American electronic musician Daniel Lopatin under the alias Oneohtrix Point Never, released on June 22, 2010, by Editions Mego. It develops the synthesizer-based compositions of Lopatin's previous work, while also incorporating elements of noise music and his own processed vocals. The album received positive reviews from critics, and was named among the best albums of 2010 by several publications, including Fact, The Wire, and Tiny Mix Tapes.

== Background ==
Returnal was recorded and mixed by Lopatin using the programs Goldwave and Multiquence. Most of the material was produced in an air-conditioned room at his parents' house in Massachusetts (credited as "Ridge Valley Digital") from July to August 2009. The album's first song was recorded in Brooklyn. Instruments including the Akai AX60, the Roland Juno-60, the Roland MSQ-700 and the Korg Electribe ES-1 as well as voice parts by Lopatin are present throughout the album, although the Roland SP-555 and Sherman Filterbank were also used in the development process.

Lopatin described Returnal as a "Rousseau record", saying, "He's a French painter during this exoticism period. They're very interesting, they're not one-to-one depictions of nature, explicitly because he didn't really like or appreciate nature. So I was drawn to that, that's kind of a vibe." He further explained to critic Simon Reynolds, "I wanted to make a world-music record. But make it hyperreal, refracted through not really being in touch with the world. [...] So I'm painting these pictures, not of the actual world, but of us watching that world." Lopatin explained the imagined scenario behind the album's opening track "Nil Admirari": "the mom's sucked into CNN, freaking out about Code Orange terrorist shit, while the kid is in the other room playing Halo 3, inside that weird Mars environment, killing some James Cameron–type predator."

The cover art for Returnal was photographed by Yelena Avanesova and designed by Stephen O'Malley.

== Composition ==
Resident Advisor noted that the album begins in "comic assault mode—the crude tangles of noise, serrated drum machines and vocal screams of 'Nil Admirari'." Sherburne described "Nil Admirari" as an "unexpected invocation" of noise music, employing "weeping voice, feedback squeal, synthesizer drones, and overdriven drum blasts" that "combust like a rocket on its launch pad," while The Quietus characterized it as "sort of hurtful: sliced-up aural detritus with no enduring rhythm or melody." Resident Advisor characterized tracks "Describing Bodies" and "Stress Waves" as "almost hymnal." The album's title track is a "mournful ballad" which "buries Lopatin's pitch-shifted vocals into a disorienting forest-haunt."

Both Simon Reynolds and Kiran Sande of Fact noted occasional similarities between the album and Jon Hassell's concept of fourth world music. Reynolds described closing track "Preyouandi" as "a shatteringly alien terrain made largely out of glassy percussion sounds, densely clustered cascades fed through echo and delay. On first listen, I pictured an ice shelf disintegrating, a beautiful, slow-motion catastrophe, [...] it's still the sort of music that gets your mind's eye reeling with fantastical imagery." Fact described the album's sound as "a psychedelia more earthbound than cosmic", calling it "music driven by an ecological rather than a narrative impulse, more interested in testing the limits of space rather than telling stories within it."

== Critical reviews ==
Professional ratings
Aggregate scores
Source	Rating
AnyDecentMusic?	7.6/10
Review scores
Source	Rating
AllMusic	4/5 stars
Beats Per Minute	68%
Drowned in Sound	8/10
Fact	5/5
Pitchfork	8.2/10
PopMatters	8/10
Resident Advisor	4.5/5
Tiny Mix Tapes	4/5
Uncut	4/5 stars

Resident Advisor stated that "Returnal feels like a document as dazed and dizzy as heatstroke, the other-state peace of dehydration or exhaustion. But its emotional terrain is in constant flux—if, thankfully, slow to evolve—full of transitions and almost sullen mood-swings that make it, at various points, entrancing, bewitching and often quite perplexing." The publication stated that "Returnal still seems like a lock for record of the year in a throwback genre expanding beyond cassette-collectors and Brain Records lovers." Pitchfork's Philip Sherburne noted Returnal to be more focused, thick and composite than Lopatin's past work, noting that when the synthesized arpeggios common in his previous releases do come up, they are "layered and blurred to the point of losing their definition." Comparing Returnal with Lopatin's previous works, Tiny Mix Tapes described the album as "not just a collection of tracks but an indivisible and cohesive whole, held in place this time not by grids and zones but by atmospheres and plumes."

== Accolades ==
Accolades for Returnal
Publication/Author	Accolade	Rank
Bleep Limited	Top 10 Albums of the Year	*
Drowned in Sound	Albums of the Year	23
Fact	The 40 Best Albums of 2010	10
The Guardian (Jude Rogers)	Albums of 2010	4
Pitchfork	The Top 50 Albums of 2010	20
PopMatters	The 70 Best Albums of 2010	67
PopMatters	The Best Experimental Music of 2010	9/8
Prefix	Best Albums of 2010	29
The Quietus	The Best Albums of 2010 So Far	11
Resident Advisor	Top 20 Albums of 2010	13
Stereogum	The Top 50 Albums of 2010	41
Tiny Mix Tapes	Favorite 50 Albums of 2010	6
Uncut	50 Best Albums of 2010	20
Uncut	The Wild Mercury Sound 100 of 2010	17
XLR8R	Favorite Releases of 2010	4
The Wire	2010 Rewind	2
* denotes an unordered list.

== In other media ==
The song "Ouroboros" was later featured on The Bling Ring soundtrack, which Lopatin also worked on.

== Track listing ==
All tracks written and produced by Daniel Lopatin.

Returnal track listing
No.	Title	Length
1.	"Nil Admirari"	5:05
2.	"Describing Bodies"	4:18
3.	"Stress Waves"	5:42
4.	"Returnal"	4:43
5.	"Pelham Island Road"	7:36
6.	"Where Does Time Go"	6:25
7.	"Ouroboros"	2:04
8.	"Preyouandi"	6:11
Total length:		41:59

== Personnel ==
Credits adapted from liner notes.

- Daniel Lopatin – music
- Al Carlson – tape-op, additional engineering
- James Plotkin – mastering
- Stephen O'Malley – design
- Yelena Avanesova – photography
