= Florian Hecker =

German sound and visual artist (born 1975)

Hecker
- Born: Florian Hecker; 1975 (age 50–51); Augsburg, Germany
- Genre: Electronic music
- Instruments: laptop, SuperCollider
- Labels: Mego, Editions Mego, Rephlex, Warner Classics, Tochnit Aleph, Presto?!, Warp
- Website: https://florianhecker.blogspot.com/

Florian Hecker is a German sound and visual artist. Born in 1975 in Augsburg, Germany and raised in Kissing, Germany Hecker studied Computational Linguistics and Psycholinguistics at LMU Munich and Fine Arts at the Akademie der Bildenden Künste, Vienna, where he received his diploma in 2003. He lives and works in Vienna and Kissing, Germany.

In performances, publications and installations, Hecker deals with specific compositional developments of post-war modernity, electro-acoustic music as well as other, non-musical disciplines. He dramatizes space, time and self-perception in his sonic works by isolating specific auditory events in their singularity, thus stretching the boundaries of their materialization. Its objectual autonomy is exposed while simultaneously evoking sensations, memories and associations in an immersive intensity.

== Biography ==
In 1998, aged 23, Florian Hecker released his first solo album IT iso 161975 on austrian independent record label Mego. It was followed by the remix album [R*] iso|chall in 2000, which included remixes by Jim O'Rourke, Bruce Gilbert, Yasunao Tone and Gescom.

In 2003, Hecker released his second album Sun Pandämonium, to critical acclaim. The album was awarded a distinction at Ars Electronica festival.

=== Collaborations ===
Since 2005 Hecker presented a series of UPIC Diffusion Sessions in collaboration with Russell Haswell, as “Haswell & Hecker”, performing recordings made exclusively with Iannis Xenakis graphic input computer music system. Amongst many other locations, at Serralves em Festa, Fundação Serralves, Porto, 2009; Conway Hall, London; Patronage of Space, Lopud; Donaufestival, Krems; Kunsthalle, Zürich all in 2007 and Cubitt at City University, London, 2005. In 2011, Editions Mego released Kanal GENDYN, a vinyl record and audio only DVD set, documenting a performance of Haswell & Hecker from 2004 employing exclusively Alberto de Campo's SuperCollider 2 version of Xenakis’ GENDYN (French for ‘GENeration DYNamique stochastique’ or English ‘Dynamic Stochastic Synthesis’) sound synthesis procedure.

Together with artist Yasunao Tone, he performed Palimpsest at Recombinant Media Labs, San Francisco; Experimental Intermedia, New York, in 2005; MIT Media Lab, Cambridge, MA, 2004; LAMPO, 6Odum, Chicago and at Spectacles Vivants, Centre Georges Pompidou, Paris, in 2002 amongst other locations.

In 2009, he collaborated on a series of performances with Aphex Twin, including amongst others Sacrum Profanum, Kraków; Warp20, Cité de la Musique, Paris and Bloc Weekend, Minehead.

Hecker created the albums Chimerization (2012) and Articulação (2014) in collaboration with Iranian philosopher Reza Negarestani.

== Exhibitions ==
=== From 2001 to 2010 ===
Solo exhibitions include: MMK, Museum für Moderne Kunst, Frankfurt am Main, Germany; IKON Gallery, Birmingham and Chisenhale Gallery, London, all in 2010. Bawag Contemporary, Vienna, 2009; Sadie Coles HQ, London, 2008 and Galerie Neu, Berlin, 2007.

Some of the group exhibitions and projects Hecker has participated in include Push and Pull, MUMOK, Vienna, 2010; Evento, Bordeaux, Thyssen-Bornemisza Art Contemporary, The Kaleidoscopic Eye, Mori Art Museum, Tokyo, UBS Openings: Saturday Live: Characters, Figures and Signs, Tate Modern, London and his most recent collaboration with Cerith Wyn Evans, No night No day, was premiered at the Teatro Goldoni as part of Fare Mondi, 53rd Venice Biennale, all in 2009. Manifesta 7, Trentino - South Tyrol, Italy, Art unlimited, Art Basel, Experiment Marathon Reykjavik, Reykjavík Art Museum in 2008, and Cerith Wyn Evans, Lenbachhaus, Munich in 2006. Off the Record, Musée d'Art Moderne de la Ville de Paris, Paris and 3rd Berlin Biennale, Berlin, in 2004, 2nd International Biennial for Contemporary Art, Gothenburg, 2003 and Mutations, TN Probe Gallery, Tokyo and Ausgeträumt..., Secession, Vienna both in 2001.

=== After 2012 ===
In 2012, Hecker took part in Documenta 13, where he exhibited the work Chimerization.

In 2013, Hecker participated in the Performa Biennial where he presented new work titled CD: A Script for Synthesis.

In 2016, his solo exhibition Formulations was presented at MMK3 (Zollamt) in Frankfurt. This exhibition included fifteen of his works created between 2004 and 2016, and two new creations.

From November 2017 to January 2018, his exhibition Halluzination, Perspektive, Synthese was shown at Kunsthalle Wien.

Between November 2021 and March 2022, his solo exhibition Resynthesizers was shown at Fitzpatrick-Leland House in Los Angeles.

== Performances ==
Hecker has given a multitude of performances, audio presentations and concerts internationally since 1996. Amongst many other places, he presented his work at Les Spectacles vivants, Centre Georges Pompidou, Paris, 2012; MIT Saarinen Chapel, Cambridge, MA; Lampo, Graham Foundation, Chicago; Push & Pull, Tate Modern, all 2011, Life is Live # 2: listen with pain!, Hebbel am Ufer, Berlin, 2010; Sound out of line, Urbanomic Studio, Falmouth; Comme des Garçons Homme Plus, Palais de la Bourse, Paris, 2009; Utopia of Sound, Akademie der Bildenden Künste, Vienna, 2008; Bridge the Gap?4, CCA, Kitakyushu and Shanghai; Cut and Splice, ICA, London, both 2006. Casa Da Música, Porto; ZKM, Karlsruhe; No Fun Festival, Brooklyn, in 2005. Taktlos, Dampfzentrale, Bern; Freunde Guter Musik, Maria am Ufer, Berlin, in 2006. CCA, Kitakyushu; Ars Electronica, Brucknerhaus, Linz; All Tomorrows Parties, Chamber Sands; Sonic Light (Sonic Acts Festival) Amsterdam in 2003. büro 44, Purple Institute, Paris; Número Festival, Lisbon; International Triennale of Contemporary Art, Yokohama, Japan; Nesh, Electrowerkz, London; LoveBytes, Sheffield all in 2001. büro 30, Spiral Hall / CAY, Tokyo; Sónar, MACBA, Barcelona; Synthèse 2000, IMEB, Bourges; Avanto, Kiasma, Museum of Contemporary Art, Helsinki; Wien Modern, Konzerthaus, Vienna in 2000.

== Selected discography ==
- Hecker: Synopsis Seriation, Editions Mego, Wien, 2021
- Hecker: Statistique Synthétique, Portraits GRM, 2020
- Hecker: Inspection II, Editions Mego, Wien, 2019
- Hecker: A Script for Machine Synthesis, Editions Mego, Wien, 2017
- Hecker: Articulação, Editions Mego, Wien, 2014
- Hecker: Chimärisation, Editions Mego, Wien, 2012
- Hecker: Speculative Solution, CD & book, Editions Mego, Wien, 2011
- Hecker: Acid in the Style of David Tudor, CD, Editions Mego, Wien, 2009
- Haswell & Hecker: UPIC Warp Tracks, CD, Warp Records, London, 2008
- Haswell & Hecker: Blackest Ever Black (Electroacoustic UPIC Recordings), CD & 2 x LP Warner Classics, London, 2007
- Hecker: Recordings for Rephlex, CD, Rephlex, London, 2006
- Yasunao Tone & Hecker: Palimpsest, CD, Mego, Wien, 2004
- Hecker: Sun Pandämonium, CD, Mego, Wien, 2003
- Hecker: [R*] iso|chall, CD, Mego, Wien, 2000
- Hecker: IT iso 161975, CD, Mego, Wien, 1998

== Exhibitions ==
- (2016) Formulations, MMK Museum für Moderne Kunst, Frankfurt
- (2015) Formulations, Culturgest, Porto
- (2013) Documenta 13, "Chimerization" documenta13 Kassel, Germany
- (2012) Florian Hecker Exhibition: 'Articulação' (Lumiar Cité, Lisbon, Portugal).
- (2008) Florian Hecker Exhibition: 'Pentaphonic Dark Matter' (Sadie Coles Gallery, Heddon St).

== Bibliography ==
- Florian Hecker - Formulations, [Published on the occasion of the exhibitions at Cultugest, Porto, 26.09.- 19.12.2016, and MMK Museum für Moderne Kunst Frankfurt am Main, 26.11.2016 - 05.02.2017], London: Koenig Books, 2016.
- Florian Hecker: event, stream, object. Cologne: Verlag der Bucchandlung Walther König; MMK Museum für Moderne Kunst, 2010.
- Florian Hecker, Russell Haswell, Robin Mackay. "Blackest ever black." Collapse (Oxford), vol. 3 (2007): 108–139.
- Florian Hecker. "A presentation of recent works." Substantials (Kitakyushu), no. 2 (2005) : 4-27.
- Nick Cain. "Dark matter compiler." The wire (London), no. 298 (December 2008).
