= Russell Haswell =

British musician and video artist (born 1970)

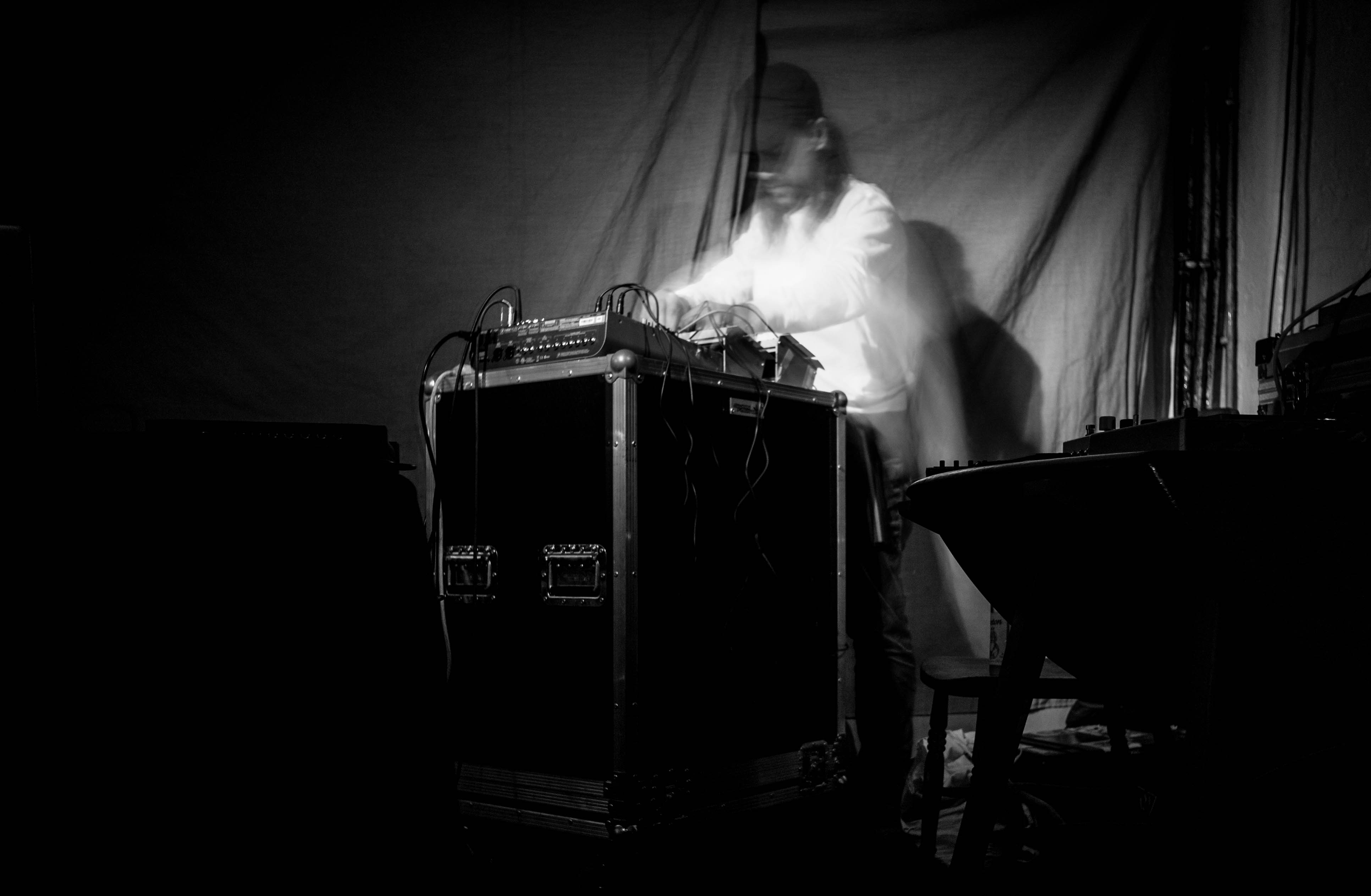
- Haswell performing at Cafe Oto in 2015

Background information
- Born: 1970 (age 55–56); Coventry, West Midlands, England
- Occupations: Musician; visual artist
- Labels: Editions Mego; Warp

Russell Haswell (born 1970) is an English musician and visual artist, self-described as a "multidisciplinary artist".

== Biography ==
Russell Haswell has exhibited conceptual and wall-based visual works, video art, public sculpture, as well as audio presentations in both art gallery and concert hall contexts. Extreme Computer Music is one specialized area of activity. An ongoing collaboration with Florian Hecker working with Iannis Xenakis' graphic-input "UPIC Music Composing System" is one project, the recorded results have been presented in the form of multi channel electroacoustic diffusion sessions, for example for the Frieze Art Fair. He has collaborated with Aphex Twin, Jake and Dinos Chapman, Florian Hecker, Earth, Popol Vuh, Kjetil Manheim, Carsten Höller, Mika Vainio, Carl Michael von Hausswolff, Masami Akita, Peter Rehberg, Zbigniew Karkowski, Gescom, Yasunao Tone and Whitehouse.

In 2002 his debut album Live Salvage 1997→2000 (Mego) received a Prix Ars Electronica Honorary Mention for Digital Musics & Sound Art. In 2005 and 2006 he curated two London-based All Tomorrow's Parties club events, entitled "Easy to Swallow", intended for the "broad-minded". The events showcased: Carl Michael von Hausswolff, Yasunao Tone + Hecker, Mark Stewart and the Maffia, Aphex Twin, Whitehouse, Surgeon + Regis Present: British Murder Boys, Lee Dorrian, Pita, Earth, Autechre and Robert Hood (ex-Underground Resistance).

In 2009 he contributed a cover of the Wild Planet song "Cabasa Cabasa" to Warp Records's 20th anniversary Warp20 (Recreated) compilation.

He also released Factual (2012), 37 Minute Workout (2014), and As Sure As Night Follows Day (2015).

== Selected discography ==
- Live Salvage 1997→2000 (Mego, 2001)
- Satanstornade (with Masami Akita; Warp, 2002)
- Blackest Ever Black (Electroacoustic UPIC Recordings) (with Florian Hecker; Warner Classics & Jazz, 2007)
- UPIC Warp Tracks (with Florian Hecker; Warp, 2008)
- Second Live Salvage (Editions Mego, 2008)
- Wild Tracks (Editions Mego, 2009)
- In It (Immersive Live Salvage) (Editions Mego, 2011)
- Convulsive Threshold (with Yasunao Tone; Editions Mego, 2013)
- New Release (1) (with Regis as Concrete Fence; Pan, 2013)
- 37 Minute Work Out (Diagonal Records, 2014)
- Electroacoustic Sludge Dither Transformation Smear Grind Decomposition nO!se File Exchange Mega Edit (with Pain Jerk; Editions Mego, 2014)
- As Sure As Night Follows Day (Diagonal Records, 2015)
- 37 Minute Work Out, Vol. 2 (Diagonal Records, 2019)
- Digital (Editions Mego, 2020)
- Reality Therapy (Diagonal Records, 2023)
- Deep Time (Diagonal Records, 2025)
- Let It Go (Editions Mego, 2026)
- Angel Ears (with Hugo Esquinca; Sähkö Recordings, 2026)
