= Simparch =

Simparch is an American artist collective that was founded in Las Cruces, New Mexico in 1996. Presently this group is organized and maintained by founding members Matthew Lynch and Steve Badgett. Former members were Pat Finlay and Robert Hollinger. Their practice involves large-scale, usually interactive installations and works that, as the group's name suggests, examine simple architecture, building practices, site specificity and materials that may be salvaged, recycled or generally brought together with a kind of d.i.y. attitude. Often collaborating with other artists, builders, art critics, graffiti artists, filmmakers, and skate boarders, and musicians, Simparch works at providing sites which allow for social interaction and experimentation with design and materials.

== Works ==
- Manufactured Home (1996)
- Hell's Trailer (1996)
- Free Basin (2000)
- Spec (2001) in collaboration with musician Kevin Drumm

== Selected exhibitions and commissions ==
- drum n basin, A Foundation, Liverpool, UK (2007)
- Gloom and Doom, Cincinnati Contemporary Arts Center, Cincinnati, OH (2006)
- Hothouse, Tate Modern, London, UK (2005)
- Dirty Water Initiative, inSite_05, Sandiego/Tijuana (2005)
- Whitney Biennial, Whitney Museum of American Art, New York (2004)
- Yerba Buena Center for the Arts, San Francisco (2004)
- Clean Livin’, Permanent installation for Center for Land Use Interpretation. Wendover, UT (2003)
- Session the Bowl. Deitch Projects, New York, NY (2002)
- Documenta XI, Kassel, Germany, Free Basin and Spec (2002)
- Mood River - Wexner Center for the Arts, Columbus, OH. (2002)
