= Sheer Hellish Miasma =

Studio album by Kevin Drumm
- Released: May 2002
- Genre: Noise
- Length: 53:26
- Label: Mego

Kevin Drumm chronology
Frozen by Blizzard Winds (2002)	Sheer Hellish Miasma (2002)	I Drink Your Skin (2002)

Sheer Hellish Miasma is a studio album by American experimental musician Kevin Drumm. It was released in May 2002, through Mego.

== Background ==
Kevin Drumm is an American experimental musician based in Chicago, Illinois. Sheer Hellish Miasma was recorded from 2000 to 2001 in Chicago. He used guitars, pedals, microphones, tapes, and analog synthesizers to create the album. It was originally released in May 2002, through Mego. It was later reissued through Editions Mego.

Sheer Hellish Miasma II, a follow-up album, was released in 2025.

== Critical reception ==
Professional ratings
Review scores
Source	Rating
AllMusic	4/5 stars
Pitchfork	8.5/10
Stylus Magazine	B

Joe Panzner of Stylus Magazine commented that "the record is stark, ominous, dark, and surrounded in allusion to metal-style savagery." He added, "For fans of Kevin Drumm, Sheer Hellish Miasma is an essential release as it captures Drumm at his most ferocious and most inventive." Leveer of Tiny Mix Tapes called the album "responsible for the cachet and explosion of 'noise' that so largely defined the 2000s."

=== Accolades ===
Accolades for Sheer Hellish Miasma
Publication	List	Rank	Ref.
Pitchfork	Top 50 Albums of 2002	39	
Tiny Mix Tapes	Favorite 100 Albums of 2000–2009	35	

== Track listing ==
Sheer Hellish Miasma track listing
No.	Title	Length
1.	"Turning Point"	3:33
2.	"Hitting the Pavement"	19:57
3.	"The Inferno"	24:37
4.	"Cloudy"	5:19
Total length:		53:26

Reissue edition track listing
No.	Title	Length
1.	"Impotent Hummer"	13:01
2.	"Turning Point"	3:33
3.	"Hitting the Pavement"	19:57
4.	"The Inferno"	24:37
5.	"Cloudy"	5:19
Total length:		66:24

== Personnel ==
Credits adapted from liner notes.

- Kevin Drumm – guitar, tape, microphone, pedal, analog synthesizer, computer assistance
