= Or Records =

British independent record label

- Founded: 1998
- Distributor: Touch Music
- Genre: Experimental
- Country of origin: United Kingdom
- Location: London
- Official website: www.itsaor.net

Or Records (sometimes capitalized OR Records after their logo) is a small British independent record label, which was established in 1998 by Russell Haswell and based in London. The label specializes in experimental music and is distributed by Touch Music. They have issued "the first ever MiniDisc only release" (Alan Phillips, Sony Software), the 1998 experimental album Minidisc by Autechre's side-project Gescom.

== Overview ==
The label was apparently established in 1998 with its first release, a CD remaster of a 1995 vinyl previously from Mego Records. They have since slowly but regularly published 15 releases from 1998 to 2003. They sign with the motto "it's a or".

Their peculiar catalogue numbering scheme use a different word for each release, followed by the actual number of the release in the catalogue: "UNLESS 1", "ORCDR 2", "ONLY 3", etc., up to "JUST 13". Their audio magazines use the more regular "ISSUE 1" and "ISSUE 2" scheme.

== Artists ==
Published artists alphabetically include: CD_Slopper, Earth, Farmersmanual (a.k.a. Farmers Manual or Farmer's Manual), Gescom, Zbigniew Karkowski & Helmut Schäfer (a.k.a. Helmut Schaefer), Francisco López, MAZK (Masami Akita & Zbigniew Karkowski), Daniel Menche, Shirt Trax (a.k.a. Shirttrax), Stützpunkt Wien 12 – plus (on anthologies) Hecker, and Incapacitants.

They also sometimes issue an "audio magazine" (a CD with the magazine for booklet) about new computer music:

- (1999) Or Some Computer Music – (featuring Aphex Twin, Beautyon, CD_Slopper, General Magic, Kevin Drumm, Stephen Travis Pope, Trevor Wishart, Ubik, Zbigniew Karkowski & Kasper T. Toeplitz)
- (2001) Or Some Computer Music 2 – (featuring Albert de Campo, Atau Tanaka & Eric Wenger, Curtis Roads, Farmersmanual, Jim O'Rourke, Phoenecia, Tom Wallace)

== See also ==
- List of independent UK record labels
