= Canopée =

French sail-assisted freighter ship

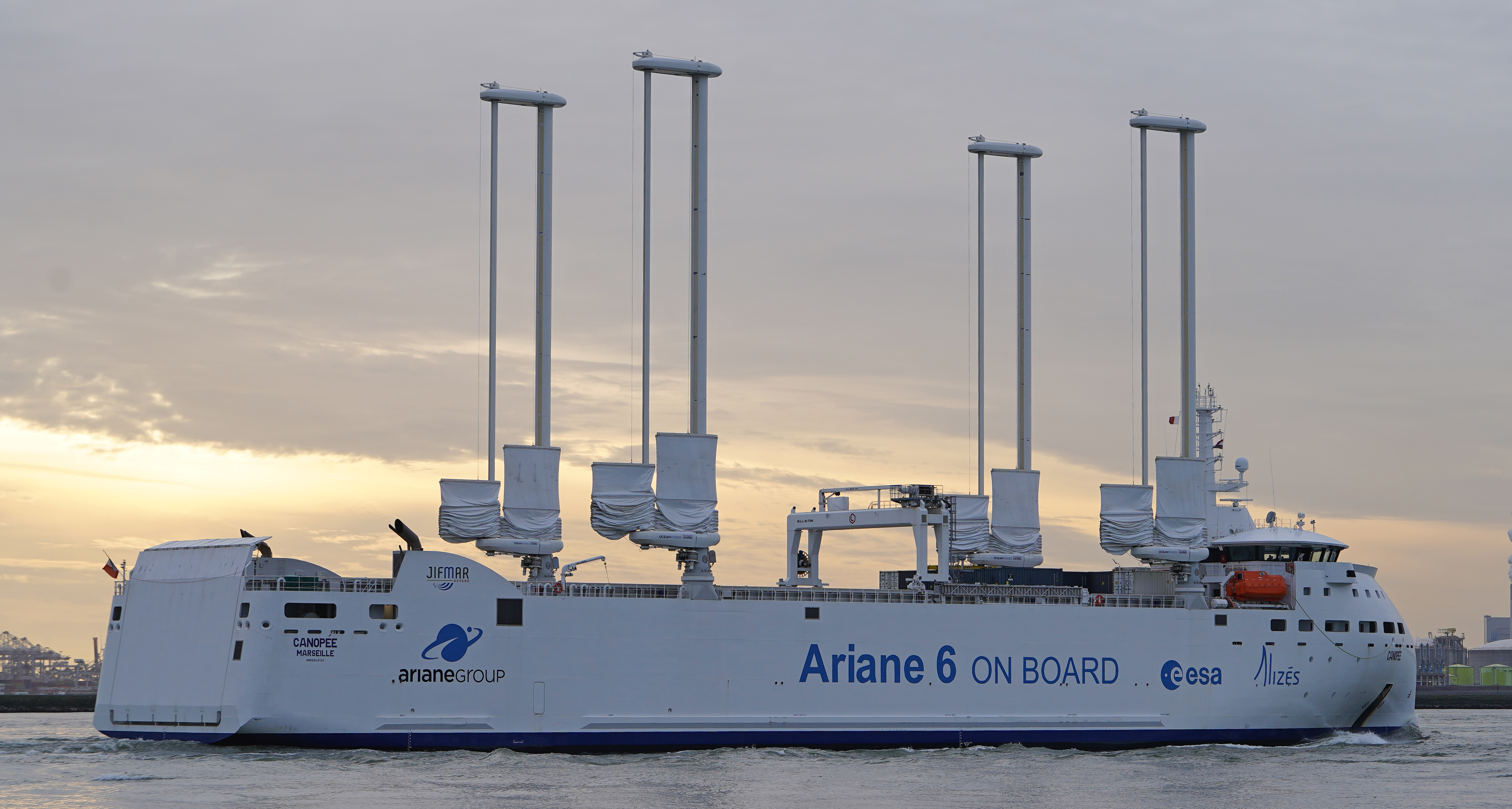

History
- Name: Canopée
- Owner: Jifmar Guyane
- Port of registry: Marseille
- Builder: Neptune Marine Projects B.V.
- Launched: 2022
- Identification: IMO number: 9924120 , MMSI number: 228438700

General characteristics
- Displacement: 10000 t
- Length: 121 m
- Beam: 22 m

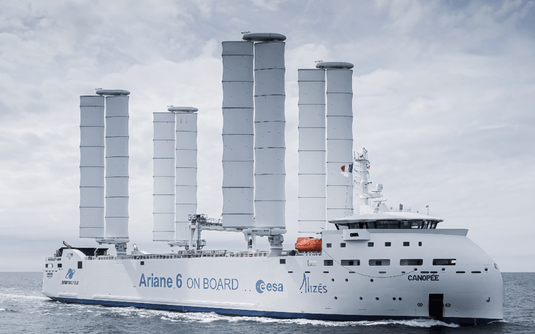
The Canopée vessel with OceanWings on the ocean

Canopée (lit. 'Canopy') is a French sail-assisted freighter ship. Laid down in 2019 and launched in 2022, it is designed specifically to transport elements of the Ariane 6 rocket from European ports to the Guiana Space Centre in Kourou, South America. It made its first trans-Atlantic crossing in December 2022.

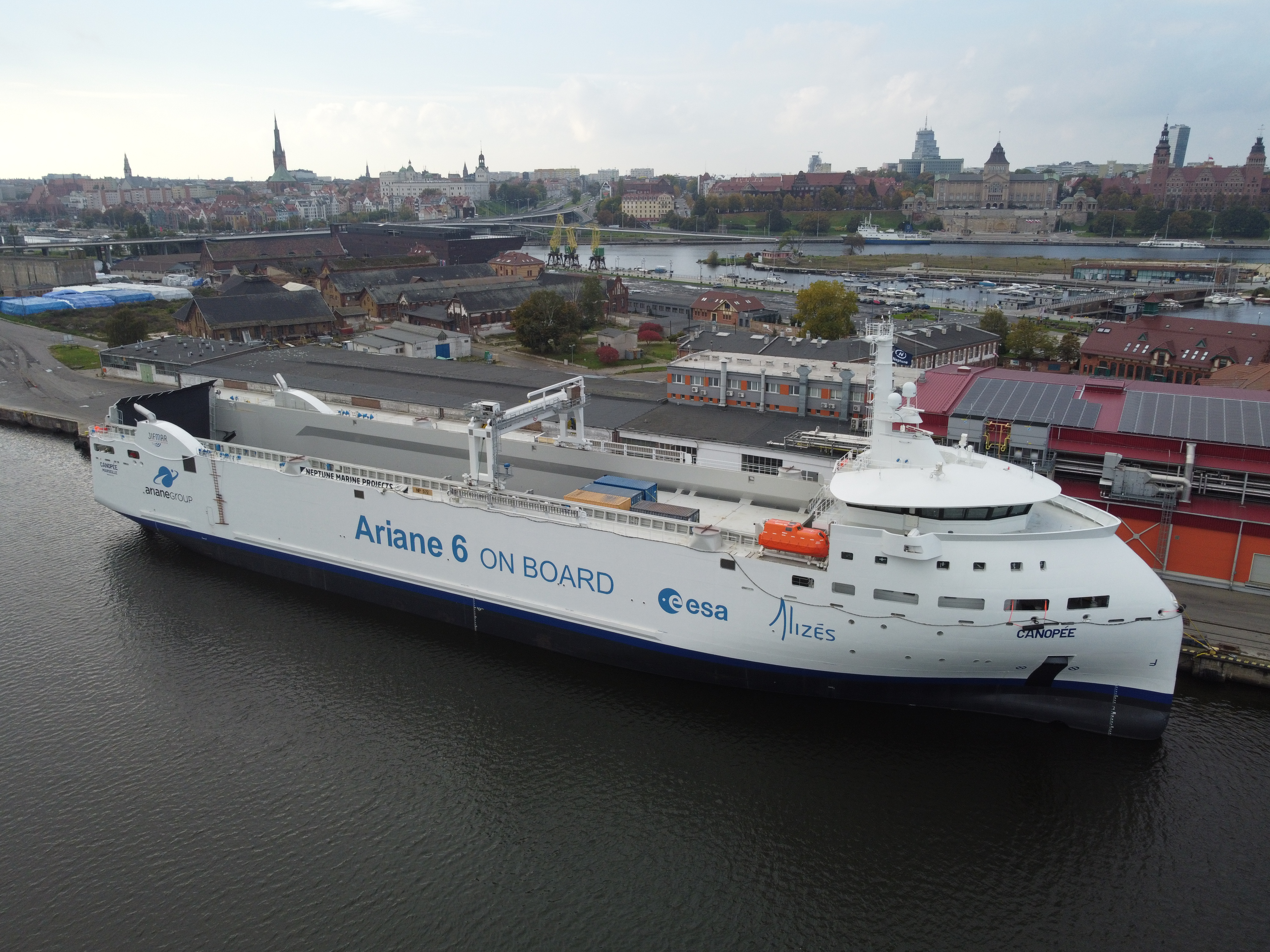
Canopée in Szczecin port, prior to the installation of the sails (2022)

The ship is owned by Jifmar Guyane, designed by VPLP Design, and was constructed by Partner Stocznia shipyard in Szczecin, Poland, and Neptune marine, Netherlands. Oceanwings sails are designed, engineered and manufactured by OceanWings (previously Ayro) in Caen France.

== Novel sail technology ==
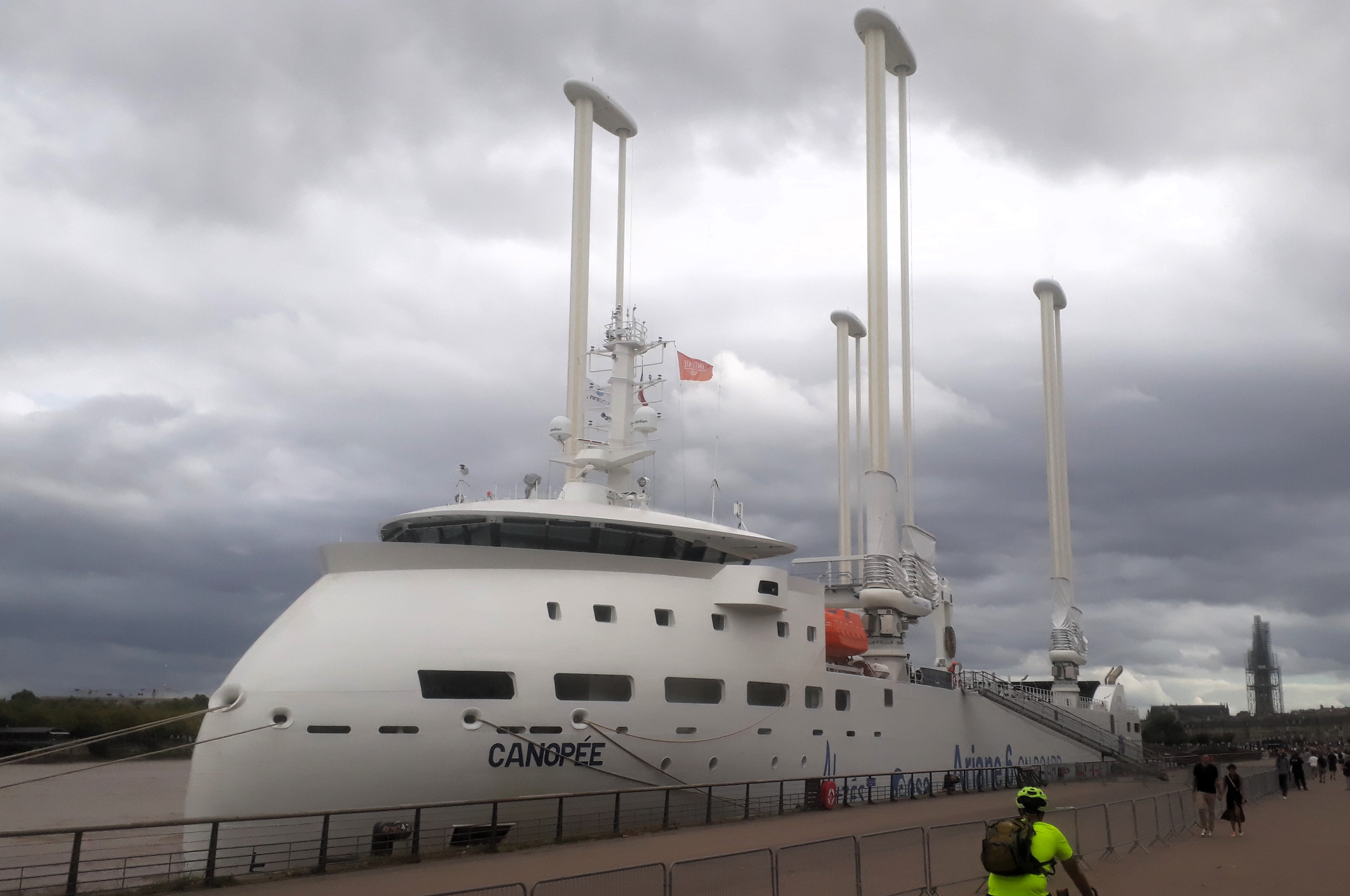
Bordeaux, 3 October 2023

The ship is equipped with four Oceanwings. Oceanwings are articulated and automated sails of 363m² each. The cargo ship has a diesel engine and the wind-powered Oceanwings can cut fuel consumption of the engine in half. The Canopée is considered a pioneer in the energy transition of maritime transport.

In June 2025, two years after its launch, operational data confirmed average fuel savings of 1.3 tonnes per day per wingsail under normal operating conditions. This corresponds to approximately 300 kW of equivalent engine power per sail. For the vessel's four OceanWings, the total savings amounted to 5.2 tonnes of fuel per day (equivalent to 20.8 tonnes of CO₂ emissions) and 1,200 kW of equivalent engine power. The system also demonstrated 99.6% operational availability.
