= Farmers Manual =

Austrian music and visual art group

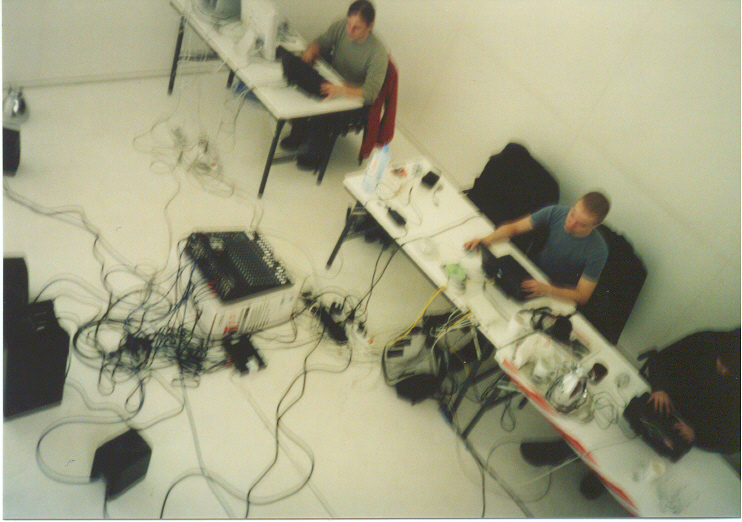
- Farmers Manual performing at the Schirn Kunsthalle, Frankfurt, February 2002

Background information
- Also known as: farmersmanual
- Origin: Vienna, Austria
- Genres: Experimental; electronic; computer music
- Years active: 1995–present
- Labels: Mego, Tray, OR, and more
- Members: Mathias Gmachl; Stefan Possert; Oswald Berthold; Gert Brantner; Nik Gaffney
- Website: web.fm

Farmers Manual is an electronic music and visual art group, founded in Vienna in the early 1990s. The core members of the collective are Mathias Gmachl, Stefan Possert, Oswald Berthold, Gert Brantner, and Nik Gaffney. Since the 1990s, the group has produced electronic music, live visuals, experimental graphics, and web design for Zeta Industries.

Their CDs, published through avant-garde labels such as Mego, Tray, and OR, often contained multimedia content. RLA (which stands for "Recent Live Archive"), is a DVD released on Mego in 2003 that contains the band's extensive backcatalogue of live concert recordings from 1995 to 2003, compressed in MP3 format - totalling 3 days and 20 hours of audio content and released under a Copyleft licence.

As visual artists, Farmers Manual have been included in numerous international festivals, such as FCMM (Montreal, 1999), Avanto (Helsinki, 2001), Art+Communication (Riga, 2006) .

== Selected discography ==
- (1996) Farmers Manual: No Backup (CD+, Mego 008)
- (1996) Farmers Manual: FM (12", Mego 017)
- (1996) Farmers Manual: Does Not Compute (12", Tray)
- (1997) Farmers Manual: fsck (CD, Tray)
- (1998) Farmers Manual: Explorers_We (CD, OR)
- (2000) CD_Slopper: SaskieWoxi (CD, OR)
- (2001) Gcttcatt: Amperase (CD+, Mego 021)
- (2002) pxp: while(p){print"."," "x$p++} (CD, Wavetrap)

Note: this album, by Farmers Manual member Oswald Berthold, was awarded an Honorary Mention at Ars Electronica 2002.

- (2003) Farmers Manual: RLA (DVD-Video/ROM, Mego 777)
- (2017) Farmers Manual: fmoto (Files, bandcamp)
