= Peter Rehberg =

British musician and composer (1968–2021)

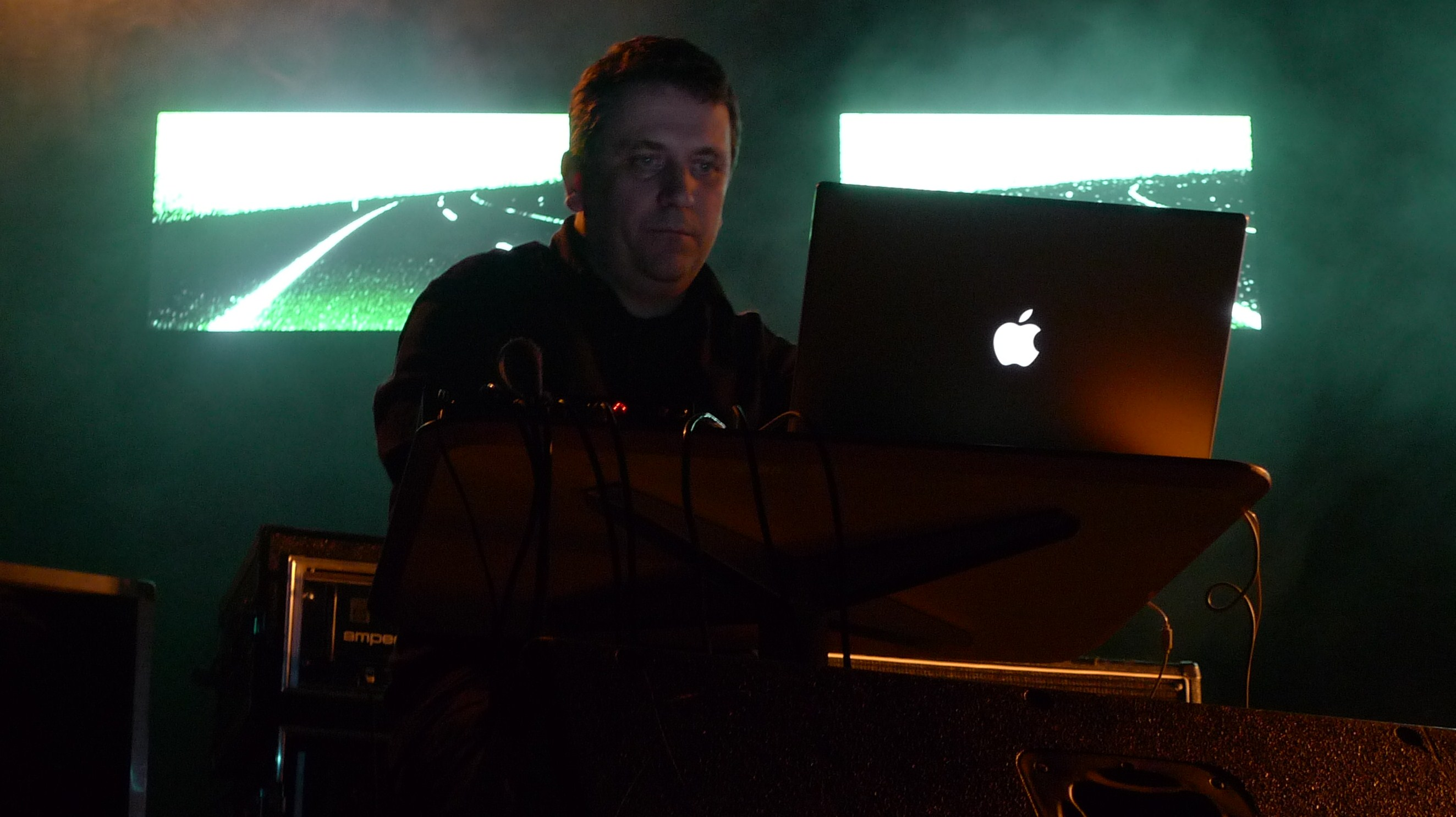
- Rehberg in 2009

Background information
- Also known as: Pita
- Born: 29 June 1968; Tottenham, United Kingdom
- Origin: St Albans, United Kingdom
- Died: 22 July 2021 (aged 53)
- Genres: Experimental; electronic; computer music; glitch
- Occupation: Musician
- Years active: 1987–2021
- Labels: Editions Mego; Mosz; Touch
- Formerly of: DACM; Fenn O'Berg; KTL; Rehberg & Bauer; R/S
- Website: Editions Mego

Peter Rehberg (29 June 1968 – 22 July 2021), also known as Pita, was a British-Austrian composer of electronic audio works. He was the head of Editions Mego, which he founded in 2006 as a successor to Mego.

== Early life ==
Rehberg was born in Tottenham on 29 June 1968. He grew up in Hertfordshire, where he attended Verulam School in St Albans. Passionate about “lists and collections” from a young age, he says he spent all his pocket money in record stores. By the age of 15, his collection already numbered 200 records. Impressed by his first visit to the Rough Trade store, he introduced his friends to the albums of JG Thirlwell and Psychic TV. In 1987, Rehberg relocated to Austria, his father's country of origin. He began his musical career there as an ambient DJ (at the Chelsea and Blue Box clubs), contributed to fanzines and music magazines, and worked for the record store Rave Up Records.

== Career ==
Rehberg became associated with Mego in the latter part of 1994. He consequently released his first EP Fridge Trax, in collaboration with Ramon Bauer and Andi Pieper (aka General Magic), early the following year. This was also the first release in the record label's catalogue. He followed this up with his debut album titled Seven Tons for Free in 1996, released under the name Pita. Three years later, Rehberg received Prix Ars Electronica Distinction Award for Digital Musics, alongside Christian Fennesz and the label itself.

Rehberg cooperated with various musicians such as Mika Vainio, Charlemagne Palestine and Oren Ambarchi. He produced music with Ramon Bauer starting in 1997 as Rehberg & Bauer. After Mego folded in 2005, Rehberg revived the label the following year as Editions Mego. He also collaborated with Stephen O'Malley starting in 2006, releasing six drone doom albums as KTL. With Fennesz and Jim O'Rourke, he founded the project Fenn O'Berg.

Rehberg released A Bas la Culture Marchande in 2007, followed by the live collaboration Colchester (2008) and the cassette Mesmer (2010). He started an archival project in 2012 called Recollection GRM. It reissued music by the Groupe de Recherches Musicales collective, including by Pierre Schaeffer, Bernard Parmegiani, Iannis Xenakis, and Beatriz Ferreyra. Under the name Pita, he also released Get In (2016).

In an interview conducted in 2016, Rehberg stated that he did not want to peddle music "in its own little box", which he felt was the norm at present. Describing his impression regarding timbre, he believed that "dissonance and resonance have to co-exist for the other to work". François Bonnet, who collaborated with Rehberg on Recollection GRM, felt that his music came to be more dense as his career progressed. He described how it retained its "radical and bold" character, while becoming "deeper, more ambivalent, more moving".

== Personal life ==
Rehberg was in a domestic partnership with Laura Siegmund until his death. He was previously in a relationship with Isabelle Piechaczyk, with whom he had one child.

Rehberg died on 22 July 2021 in Berlin. He was 53, and had suffered a heart attack prior to his death. Following his death, obituaries were published, among others, by The New York Times, The Guardian, The Wire and Artforum.

== Selected discography ==
=== Albums ===
- Pita: Seven Tons for Free (Mego, 1996)
- General Magic & Pita: Live & Final Fridge (Source, 1996)
- Rehberg & Bauer: faßt (Touch, 1997)
- Rehberg & Bauer: ballt (Touch, 1999)
- Pita: Get Out (Mego, 1999)
- Fennesz/O'Rourke/Rehberg: The Magic Sound of Fenn O'Berg (Mego, 1999)
- Rehberg & Bauer: passt (Touch, 2001)
- Pita: Get Down (Mego, 2002)
- DACM: Showroom Dummies (Mego, 2002)
- Fennesz/O'Rourke/Rehberg: The Return of Fenn O'Berg (Mego, 2002)
- Pita: Get Off (Häpna, 2004)
- Pita: A Bas la Culture Marchande (No Fun Productions, 2007)
- KTL (Stephen O'Malley & Peter Rehberg): KTL2 (Editions Mego, 2007)
- KTL (Stephen O'Malley & Peter Rehberg): KTL3 (Or, 2007)
- R/S (Rehberg & Schmickler): One (Erstwhile, 2007)
- KTL (Stephen O'Malley & Peter Rehberg): Live in Krems (Editions Mego, 2007)
- Pita: Get Out (Editions Mego Version) (Editions Mego, 2008)
- Z'EV vs Pita: Colchester (Editions Mego, 2008)
- Peter Rehberg: Work for GV 2004–2008 (Editions Mego, 2008)
- KTL (Stephen O'Malley & Peter Rehberg): IV (Editions Mego, 2009)
- R/S (Rehberg & Schmickler): USA (PAN, 2011)
- Pita: Get In (Editions Mego, 2016)
- Pita: Get On (Editions Mego, 2019)
- KTL (Stephen O'Malley & Peter Rehberg): VII (Editions Mego, 2020)
- Peter Rehberg: At GRM (Portraits GRM, 2022)
- Peter Rehberg: Liminal States (Editions Mego, 2025)

=== EPs ===
- General Magic & Pita: Fridge Trax (Mego, 1995)
