= Editions Mego =

Austrian independent record label

- Founded: 1994 as Mego
- Founder: Peter Rehberg aka Pita; Ramon Bauer; Andreas Pieper; Peter Meininger
- Genre: Electronic, glitch, noise, post-industrial
- Country of origin: Austria
- Location: Vienna
- Official website: https://mego.at/

Editions Mego is an experimental electronic music independent record label founded in 1994 as Mego in Vienna, Austria. The label was renamed in 2006 as a new company, set up both to keep the Mego albums in print and to issue new albums, and was run by Peter Rehberg a.k.a. Pita. The label has released over 400 records in 30 years of activity.

== Musical style ==
The Mego label (and its second iteration, Editions Mego) has stood out for its unpredictability, as it has not been tied to any particular musical style. It has released music by artists as diverse as Fennesz, Russell Haswell, Oneohtrix Point Never, Bill Orcutt, and the band Emeralds, in styles ranging "from electroacoustic music to metal, synthwave, drone, and ambient".

Among the albums that had a strong impact and launched the careers of musicians, journalist Tristan Bath mentions Endless Summer by Fennesz, Returnal by Oneohtrix Point Never, and Ecstatic Computation by Caterina Barbieri.

== Impact and critical acclaim ==
Mego's efforts were awarded a distinction at the Ars Electronica 1999. In the jury's statement, Jim O'Rourke lauded the label's work as defining "a brand new punk computer music".

== History ==
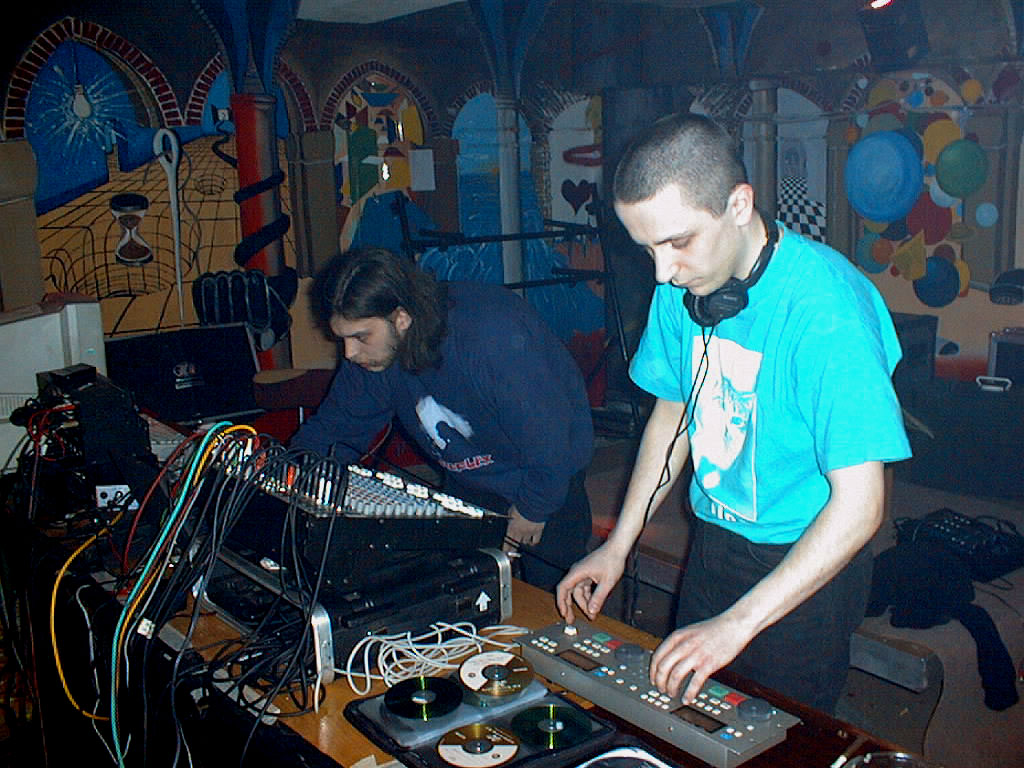
Performance by Mego artists (including Peter Rehberg) in 1997.

=== 1994–2005: First phase as Mego ===
The Mego label was founded in 1994 by Ramon Bauer, Andreas Pieper, and Peter Meininger in Vienna. The label's name allegedly refers to the expression “My Eyes Glaze Over” coined by American futurologist and geostrategist Herman Kahn, or to a “hacker expression to indicate that you've spent too much time in front of the screen”. Mego's founders were joined in 1995 by Englishman Peter Rehberg.

The label's logo in 2005.

In 2005, after 10 years and 75 releases, Mego faced financial difficulties, and Bauer and Pieper decided to shut down the label.

=== 2006: Launch of Editions Mego ===
In 2006, Peter Rehberg founded Editions Mego to continue Mego's exploratory work and keep the Mego back catalogue available.

In 2010, two releases by American artists, Does It Look Like I'm Here? by Emeralds and Returnal by Oneohtrix Point Never, marked a new direction for the "Mego" sound, less noisy and heavily influenced by analog synthesizers. Both albums featured in Bleep website's top 10 albums of 2010.

Among the iconic albums released during Rehberg's final years of activity at Editions Mego, journalist Philip Sherburne cites Hubris (2016) by Oren Ambarchi, Ecstatic Computation (2019) by Caterina Barbieri, and Peel (2020) by Kenyan musician KMRU.

== Mego releases ==
- MEGO 001 General Magic + Pita: Fridge Trax 12" (05.1995)
- MEGO 002 General Magic / Elin: Die Mondlandung 12" (05.1995)
- MEGO 003 Stützpunkt Wien 12: UFO Beobachtungen 93-95 2x12" (05.1995) (released on CD by Or, 01.1998)
- MEGO 004 Fennesz: Instrument 12" (10.1995) (tracks appear on Fennesz: Field Recordings, released by Touch 09.2002)
- MEGO 005 DJ DSL: I L.O.V.E. You 12" (10.1995)
- MEGO 006 Sluta Leta: Fan Club 12" (11.1995)
- MEGO 007 The Mego Jacket (08.1995)
- MEGO 008 Farmers Manual: No Backup CD+ (05.1996)
- MEGO 009 Pita: Seven Tons For Free CD (06.1996) (released in Japan by Digital Narcis, 01.1999)
- MEGO 010 General Magic: Frantz CD (06.1997) (released in Japan by Digital Narcis, 06.2003)
- MEGO 011 Potuznik: Amore Motore (...Autobahn) CD (04.1998)
- MEGO 012 Russell Haswell: Live Salvage 1997-2000 CD (04.2001)
- MEGO 013 not released
- MEGO 014 Hecker: IT ISO161975 CD (07.1998)
- MEGO 015 Pure: The End Of Vinyl 3"CD" (03.1999)
- MEGO 015v Pure: The End Of Vinyl 12" Picture Disc (04.2001)
- MEGO 016 Fennesz: Hotel Paral.lel CD (09.1997)
- MEGO 017 Farmers Manual: fm 12" (08.1996)
- MEGO 018 Evol: Principio 3" CD (04.1999)
- MEGO 019 Goem: Dertig CM 12" (03.1999)
- MEGO 020 Fennesz: Plays 7" (11.1998) (released a CDS by Moikai, 02.1999)
- MEGO 020t Fennesz: Plays T-shirt (12.1998)
- MEGO 021 gcttcatt: ampErase CD+ (10.2001)
- MEGO 022 Masami Akita/Azuma/Haswell/Sakaibara: Ich Schnitt Mich In Den Finger 12" (05.1997)
- MEGO 023 SKOT presents The Mego Videos 96-98 VHS/PAL (05.1999)
- MEGO 023t SKOT T-shirt (01.1999)
- MEGO 024 Hecker: [R*] iso | chall CD (02.2000)
- MEGO 025 Fuckhead: The Male Comedy (...oder der Traum vom kleinen Glück) CD (10.1998)
- MEGO 026 Fanclub Erdberg/DJ DSL: Anton Polster Du Bist Leiwand 7" (10.1997)
- MEGO 026CD Fanclub Erdberg/DJ DSL: Anton Polster Du Bist Leiwand CDS (10.1997)
- MEGO 027 Zbigniew Karkowski: it 3"CD (06.2000)
- MEGO 028 Nachtstrom: 17 Songs After Midnight LP (07.1999)
- MEGO 029 Pita: Get Out CD (10.1999) (released on vinyl by Moikai, 09.2000)
- MEGO 030 Pure: Noonbugs CD (09.2002)
- MEGO 031 Fennesz/O'Rourke/Rehberg: The Magic Sound Of Fenn O'Berg CD (12.1999)
- MEGO 032 General Magic: Rechenkönig CD (10.2000)
- MEGO 033 IBM: The Oval Recording LP+7" (01.2001)
- MEGO 034 Francisco López: untitled #92 LP (06.2000)
- MEGO 035 Fennesz: Endless Summer CD (06.2001) (released in Japan by P-Vine, 09.2003)
- MEGO 035v Fennesz: Endless Summer LP (06.2001)
- MEGO 035t Fennesz: Endless Summer T-shirt (09.2001)
- MEGO 036 not released
- MEGO 037 Ilpo Väisänen: Asuma CD (01.2001)
- MEGO 038 Evol: Magia Potagia CD (03.2005)
- MEGO 039 Uli Troyer: NOK 3"CD (09.2000)
- MEGO 040 Merzbow: A Taste Of.. CD (05.2002)
- MEGO 041 ddkern: gern 12" (01.2002)
- MEGO 042 Dr. Nachtstrom: Leidenschaft CD (02.2002)
- MEGO 043 Skot vs. Hecker VHS/PAL (04.2000)
- MEGO 044 Hecker: Sun Pandämonium CD (02.2003)
- MEGO 045 Alexandre Navarro: Horizons 2018 CD (01.2003)
- MEGO 047 Tujiko Noriko: Shojo Toshi CD (05.2001) (see also eMEGO 047)
- MEGO 777 Farmers Manual: rla DVD-ROM (03.2003)
- MEGO 049 Pita: Get Down LP (06.2002)
- MEGO 049t Pita: Get Down T-shirt (09.2002)
- MEGO 050 Jim O'Rourke: I'm Happy, And I'm Singing, And a 1,2,3,4 CD (12.2001) (released in Japan by P-Vine, 09.2002)
- MEGO 050v Jim O'Rourke: I'm Happy, And I'm Singing, And a 1,2,3,4 LP (01.2002)
- MEGO 051 Massimo: Hey babe, let me see your USB and I'll show you my FireWire 3"CD (11.2001)
- MEGO 052 2002 - 125ccm / 2-stroke race kart (03.2003)
- MEGO 053 Kevin Drumm: Sheer Hellish Miasma CD (05.2002)
- MEGO 054 Fennesz/O'Rourke/Rehberg: The Return Of Fenn O'Berg CD (07.2002) (released in Japan by P-Vine, 09.2002)
- MEGO 054v Fennesz/Jim O'Rourke/Rehberg: The Return Of Fenn O'Berg LP (07.2002)
- MEGO 055 COH: Mask Of Birth CD (08.2002)
- MEGO 056 DACM: ShowroomDummies CD (06.2002)
- MEGO 057 Tujiko Noriko: I Forgot The Title 12" (06.2002)
- MEGO 058 Ilsa Gold: Regretten? Rien! DoCD (10.2003)
- MEGO 059 quintetAvant: Floppy Nails LP (12.2002)
- MEGO 060 Yasunao Tone & Hecker: Palimpsest CD (10.2004)
- MEGO 061 Mego presents: Playback Device Confusion Volume One featuring Aleph Empire shaped 3"CD (12.2002)
- MEGO 062 Tujiko Noriko: Hard Ni Sasete (Make Me Hard) CD (10.2002)
- MEGO 063 Massimo: Hello Dirty CD (10.2002)
- MEGO 064 Hecker: 2 Track 12" (03.2003) (released in collaboration with Synaesthesia, SYN 004)
- MEGO 065 not released
- MEGO 066 BulBul: Drabule 12" (07.2004)
- MEGO 067 COH: Electric Electric 12" (09.2003)
- MEGO 068 not released
- MEGO 069 Russell Haswell & Hecker: "Revision" single sided 12" (06.2005)
- MEGO 070 Fritz Ostermayer: Kitsch Concrète CD (08.2003)
- MEGO 071 Zeena Parkins & Ikue Mori: Phantom Orchard CD (05.2004)
- MEGO 072 Gert-Jan Prins: Risk 3"CD (03.2004)
- MEGO 073 Sluta Leta: Semi Peterson CD (11.2003)
- MEGO 074 Rob Mazurek: Sweet & Vicious Like Frankenstein CD (01.2004)
- MEGO 075 Vega/Vainio/Väisänen (VVV): Resurrection River CD (05.2005)
- MEGO 076 COH: 0397POST-POP DoCD (01.2005)
- MEGO 077 see eMEGO 077
- MEGO 078 not released
- MEGO 079 dieb13 vs. Takeshi Fumimoto 12" picture vinyl (06.2005)
- MR 001 Radian: tg11 CD (03.2000) (released in collaboration with Rhiz)
- HEC2 Hecker: PV Trecks CD (03.2004)

== Selected Editions Mego releases ==
- eMEGO 080 Anthony Pateras & Robin Fox: Flux Compendium CD (01.2006)
- eMEGO 081 Hecker: Electronic Music Soundtrack for The Disenchanted Forest x 1001 by Angela Bulloch DoCD (02.2006)
- eMEGO 047 Tujiko Noriko: 少女都市+ (Shojo Toshi+) CD (05.2006)
- eMEGO 077 quintetAvant: En Concert à la Salle des Fêtes CD (07.2006)
- eMEGO 084 KTL CD (10.2006)
- eMEGO 020 Fennesz: Plays 10" vinyl (11.2006)
- eMEGO 035 Fennesz: Endless Summer CD (12.2006)
- eMEGO 078 Tujiko Noriko: Solo CD (02.2007)
- eMEGO 053 Kevin Drumm: Sheer Hellish Miasma CD (03.2007)
- eMEGO 083 Philipp Quehenberger: Phantom In Paradise CD (04.2007)
- eMEGO 085 KTL: 2 CD (05.2007)
- eMEGO 088 Kevin Drumm & Daniel Menche: Gauntlet CD (07.2007)
- eMEGO 085.5 KTL: Eine eiserne Faust in einem Samthandschuh CDR (09.2007)
- eMEGO 016 Fennesz: Hotel Paral.lel CD (09.2007)
- eMEGO 001 General Magic & Pita: Fridge Trax DigitalDownload
- eMEGO 082 Marcus Schmickler: Altars Of Science DVD+ (10.2007)
- eMEGO 086 KTL: Live In Krems LP (12.2007)
- DeMEGO 003 Stephen O'Malley & Attila Csihar: 6°FSKYQUAKE CD (01.2008)
- DeMEGO 002 Gert-Jan Prins: Break Before Make CD (01.2008)
- DeMEGO 001 Silvia Fässler & Billy Roisz: Skylla CD (01.2008)
- eMEGO 087 Angel: Kalmukia CD (01.2008)
- eMEGO 085.5 KTL: IKKI CDR (02.2008)
- eMEGO 090 Popol Vuh: Mika Vainio / Haswell & Hecker Remixes 12" (03.2008)
- eMEGO 029 Pita: Get Out CD (05.2008)
- eMEGO 013 Russell Haswell: Second Live Salvage 2LP (06.2008)
- eMEGO 091 Prurient: Arrowhead CD (07.2008)
- DeMEGO 004 Z'EV vs. PITA: Colchester CD (08.2008)
- eMEGO 089.5 KTL IV: THE PARIS DEMOS CDR (09.2008)
- eMEGO 092 Peter Rehberg: Work For GV 2004-2008 CD (10.2008)
- DeMEGO 005 ibitsu: foolproof betters fools bettering foolproof... CD (11.2008)
- eMEGO 093 Angel: Hedonism CD (12.2008)
- DeMEGO 006 Anthony Pateras & Robin Fox: End Of Daze CD (12.2008)
- eMEGO 089 KTL IV CD (01.2009)
- DeMEGO 007 BJ Nilsen & Stilluppsteypa: Man From Deep River CD (01.2009)
- eMEGO 098 Lucio Capece & Mika Vainio: Trahnie CD (03.2009)
- eMEGO 094 Hecker: Acid In The Style Of David Tudor CD (05.2009)
- eMEGO 050 Jim O'Rourke: I'm Happy, and I'm Singing, and a 1,2,3,4 Double CD (05.2009)
- eMEGO 3154 Fenn O'Berg: Magic & Return Double CD (07.2009)
- eMEGO 096 Bruce Gilbert: Oblivio Agitatum CD (10.2009)
- eMEGO 099 Russell Haswell: Wild Tracks CD (10.2009)
- eMEGO 097 Cindytalk: The Crackle Of My Soul CD (11.2009)
- DeMEGO 009 Sister Iodine: Flame Desastre CD (11.2009)
- eMEGO 102 Bruce Gilbert: This Way (25th Anniversary Reissue) CD (12.2009)
- DeMEGO 008 Daniel Menche: Kataract CD (12.2009)
- EMEGO 241 Yasunao Tone : Deviation #1, #2 CD (2017)

== See also ==
- List of record labels
- List of electronic music record labels
