= Sonic Acts =

Dutch cultural organization

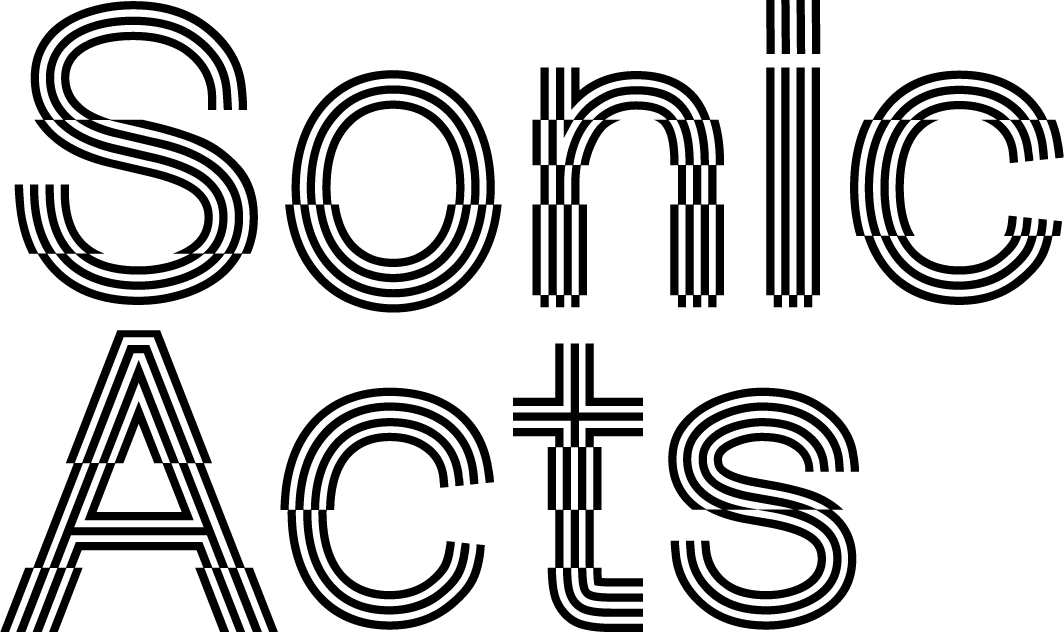
- Locations: Amsterdam, Netherlands
- Years active: 1994–present
- Website: http://www.sonicacts.com/

Sonic Acts is an interdisciplinary arts organization focused on the research, development, and production of work at the intersection of art, science, and theory. Originally founded to shape new directions in electronic music, it aims to provide a platform for international projects, artistic research and the commissioning and co-production of new artworks, often working in collaboration with local and international partner organisations, including cultural incubators, universities and art festivals. The organisation also hosts the Sonic Arts Biennial (formerly the Sonic Acts Festival).

== History ==
=== Early years (1994–1998) ===
Sonic Acts was founded in 1994 by Paradiso and the ArtScience Interfaculty (Royal Academy of Art, The Hague, and Royal Conservatory of The Hague) to provide a platform for new developments in electronic music and interdisciplinary art forms. The festival was initially organised annually at Paradiso. At first, Sonic Acts predominantly focused on demonstrations and workshops, but it later broadened in scope to address both the theoretical and practical aspects of artistic development.

In 1995, Sonic Acts introduced new forms of electronic music, such as IDM and electro. The festival featured performances by English electronic musician Mike Paradinas and ambient techno duo Plaid, among others.

=== Turn of the century (1999–2009) ===
In 1999, the Sonic Acts festival moved from August to December 23, and expanded to include new events, such as a four-hour boat trip along the IJ to various venues including Paradiso. That year's theme was the work of Italian composer Claudio Monteverdi. Since 2001, each edition of the festival has had its own theme.

In the early 2000s, Sonic Acts shifted its focus to digital art and its historical context. Under the name Sonic Light, the ninth edition of Sonic Acts was devoted to "the shaping in time of light and colour in a way which is comparable to the way sound is shaped into music". The festival featured projections by the late German-American filmmaker Oskar Fischinger and Japanese artist Yasunao Tone, as well as Dutch artist Joost Rekveld, who presented a history of abstract animation and light art. Sonic Light also featured American composer Maryanne Amacher, avant-garde musician Francisco López, Japanese composer Ikue Mori, and Canadian electronic musician Venetian Snares.

In 2004, Sonic Acts held its tenth edition, titled Unsorted, which explored emerging art forms rooted in the idea of an information society, featuring artists from labels including Raster-Noton and Touch and drawing inspiration from the breakcore scene. Performing artists included Carl Michael von Hausswolff, Jon Wozencroft, Philip Jeck, BJ Nilsen, Fennesz, Chris Watson and Sickboy. The exhibition showcased the work of artists including Driessens & Verstappen, Lia, and JODI (Joan Heemskerk and Dirk Paesmans, whose practices involved the early internet era and its culture).

The following edition, titled The Anthology of Computer Art, was held from 23 to 26 February 2006 in Paradiso and De Balie. It focused on the history of computer art and described itself as "a tribute to the work of the early pioneers". The festival featured a keynote by curator Jasia Reichardt (known for organising the exhibition Cybernetic Serendipity (1968)) as well as talks by Frieder Nake, Lillian Schwartz, and Curtis Roads, a presentation by interactive artist Golan Levin, and an audio-visual performance by the Austrian collective Granular Synthesis.

In 2008, the twelfth edition of the festival explored the theme of The Cinematic Experience, addressing how "recent technological developments in digitalisation, higher definition imagery and sound, ever-faster communication networks and new types of portable video players make it necessary to re-address the question of what cinema actually is." This edition featured Signal—the trio consisting of Frank Bretschneider, Carsten Nicolai, and Raster-Noton founder Olaf Bender—as well as Ken Jacobs, Erkki Huhtamo, and Hildur Guðnadóttir.

=== Recent years (2010–2020) ===
From 2010, Sonic Acts started to engage in international collaborations with groups such as the Kontraste festival in Austria and the international research project Dark Ecology.

The title of the 2010 edition, The Poetics of Space, was derived from the English translation of La Poétique de l'Espace (1958), a book by the French philosopher Gaston Bachelard. The programme included a tribute to Maryanne Amacher, who died in 2009. Speakers included theorist Brandon LaBelle, acoustic ecology composer Barry Truax, and Hildegard Westerkamp, who spoke on the subject of soundwalks. The programme also featured work by architectural studio Diller + Scofidio, among others.

The 2012 edition of the festival, titled Travelling Time, explored the perception and manipulation of time in art, science, and sound. The programme included an opening lecture by George Dyson, the multi-projector film installation Shutter Interface by Paul Sharits, a performance by Catherine Christer Hennix and The Chora(s)san Time-Court Mirage, and a presentation of the Long String Instrument by Ellen Fullman.

In 2013, the Sonic Acts festival focused on themes drawn from cosmology and theoretical physics under the title The Dark Universe. The programme included lectures by physicist and Nobel laureate Gerard 't Hooft, sociologist Saskia Sassen, and architect Keller Easterling, along with presentations of new works by artists Matthijs Munnik, Yamila Ríos, and Joris Strijbos.

In 2015, the festival was titled The Geologic Imagination and examined the Anthropocene and the impact of human activity on planetary systems. Framed by the idea that humanity is living in a new geological epoch, the programme addressed concepts such as deep time, material agency, and geoaesthetics through a transdisciplinary lens. It featured lectures by philosopher Graham Harman and design theorist Benjamin H. Bratton, masterclasses by composer Goodiepal and video artists Steina and Woody Vasulka, and newly commissioned work by artists including Raviv Ganchrow and Jananne Al-Ani. The 2015 edition drew approximately 9,500 attendees.

In 2017, Sonic Acts, in the festival titled The Noise of Being, explored humanity against the backdrop of the Anthropocene and the rapidly changing relationship between humans and machines. The festival had 10,625 attendees. Participating artists and speakers included Eyal Weizman, JK Flesh, Roly Porter, Kara-Lis Coverdale, Jennifer Walshe, Le1f, Evian Christ and Christina Vantzou. The opening night featured four new Vertical Cinema films by Susan Schuppli, HC Gilje, Lukas Marxt, and BJ Nilsen & Karl Lemieux. The Wire Magazine described the festival as "triggering the imagination necessary for an urgent debate". Crack Magazine wrote that the event "kept its audience shifting, rotating, and reversing around the normalised ideas we all share".

In 2019, the Sonic Acts festival marked its 25th anniversary under the theme HEREAFTER, addressing global crises and challenges. The programme critically considered the interconnected impacts of colonialism, climate change, labour exploitation, and technological advancement, reflecting on the deep-seated inequalities and environmental degradation they have caused. HEREAFTER hosted more than 120 artists and speakers, including Beatriz Ferreyra, Christina Kubisch, Áine O'Dwyer, Timothy Morton, Rosi Braidotti, Jodi Dean, Tony Cokes, and Ulrike Ottinger.

In 2021, Sonic Acts Press began publishing Ecoes, a magazine dedicated to sound art, technology and ecology. The name of the magazine comes from a portmanteau of 'ecology' and 'echoes'. As of 2024, the magazine has seven issues.

=== Sonic Acts Biennial (2022–present) ===
In 2022, Sonic Acts shifted from an annual festival to a two-month-long biennial format, with the aim of enabling a broader and more sustained engagement with contemporary issues. The first Sonic Acts Biennial focused on ecological and technological crises, examining the relationships between humans, nature, and machines.

The exhibition programme, hosted at W139 under the title One Sun After Another, was described by Metropolis M journalist Sanneke Huisman as a response to ecological emergency, featuring "urgent works that raise questions about ownership (who owns nature?), life forms (what is the position of non-human life?), and the role of humans in a changing world." The Biennial attracted approximately 20,000 visitors and featured performances, installations, and discussions by artists including Raven Chacon, Félicia Atkinson, Kali Malone, Aura Satz, Sarah Davachi, Stephen O'Malley, Tarek Atoui, Tomoko Sauvage, Debit, Jessica Ekomane, Lucky Dragons, Samson Young, Julian Charrière, and Mary Maggic.

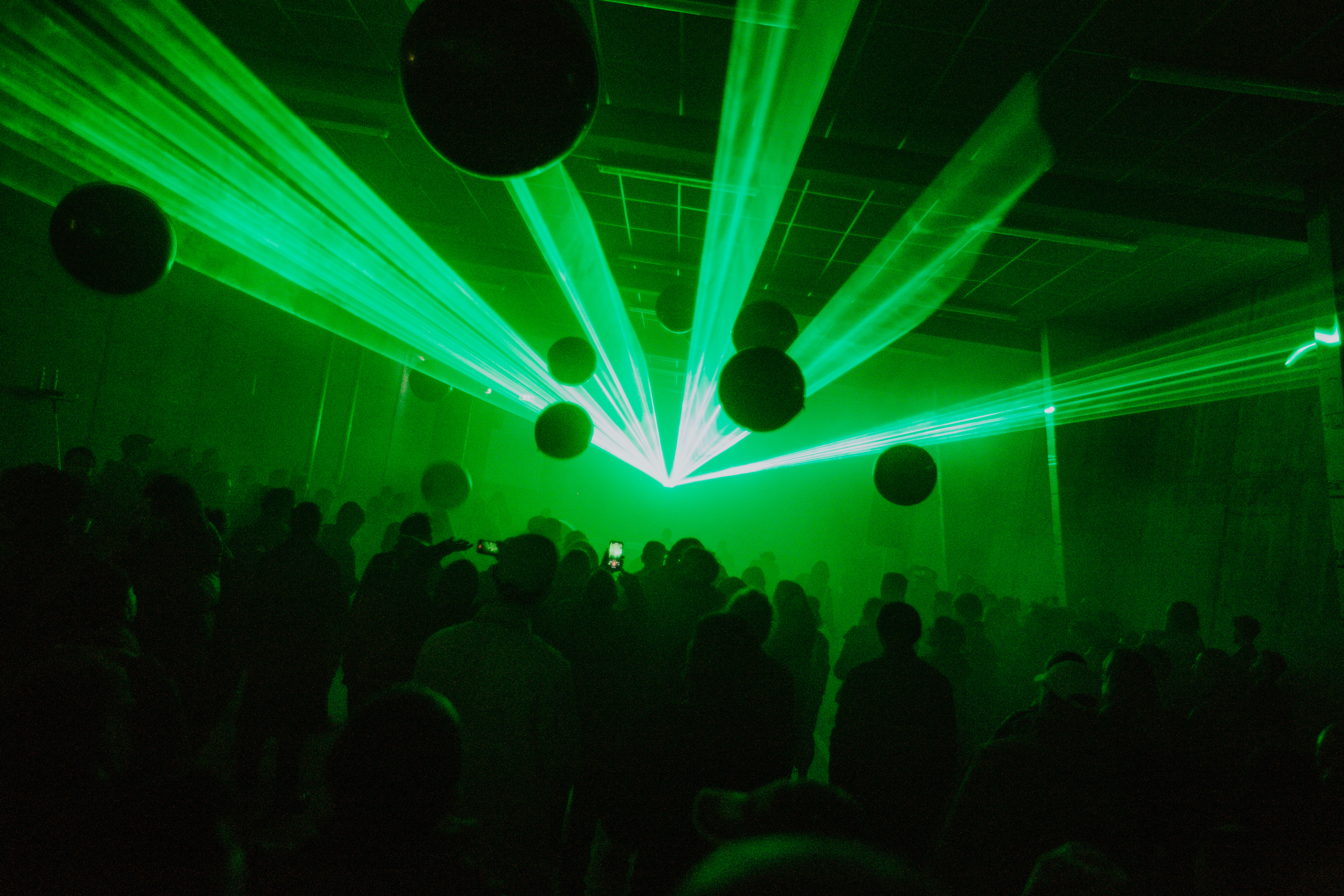
Hugo Esquinca + Russell Haswell performing as part of Expanded Experience at Muziekgebouw during the Sonic Acts Biennial 2024. Photo by Pierre Zylstra.

In 2024, Sonic Acts marked its 30th anniversary with a Biennial titled Under the Spell of the Sensuous, referencing David Abram's 1996 book The Spell of the Sensuous: Perception and Language in a More-Than-Human World. Published around the time of Sonic Acts' founding, the book raises questions about perception, language, and our relationship with the environment and other species. The Biennial featured artists and speakers including Charlemagne Palestine, Astrida Neimanis, KMRU, ZULI, Dis Fig, Tarek Atoui, Aho Ssan, Denise Ferreira da Silva and Arjuna Neuman, Susan Schuppli, Elvia Wilk, Natasha Tontey, Jota Mombaça, and Kassel Jaeger.

The 2024 edition introduced the Listening Room, an 8.2-channel sound installation for focused listening, hosted at Zone2Source in Amstelpark. The installation featured works by Annea Lockwood, Keith Fullerton Whitman, Beatriz Ferreyra, Iannis Xenakis, Flora Yin Wong, and Jim O'Rourke. Writing about the experience, journalist Anton Spice noted: "[...] at Zone2Source, you are reminded more of just how porous these boundaries are [...] It was a rare moment where I felt like I could put both my body and my mind to rest and just let the listening take over."

== Evolution and growth ==
Sonic Acts is now an annually active organization. Projects include the three-year art, research and commissioning project Dark Ecology, which predominantly took place in the Arctic region. It is also globally touring film programme Vertical Cinema.

== Projects ==
=== Sonic Arts Biennial ===
The Sonic Acts Biennial (formerly festival) explores contemporary and historical developments at the intersections of art, technology, music, and science. It has programmed artists and musicians such as Autechre, Pauline Oliveros, Florian Hecker, Maryanne Amacher, Catherine Christer Hennix, Annea Lockwood, Hildegard Westerkamp, Hildur Guðnadóttir, Ellen Fullman, Keith Fullerton Whitman, Colin Stetson, Kodwo Eshun and The Otolith Group, Peter Kubelka, Stephen O'Malley, The Bug, Chris Watson, Fennesz, Speedy J, Lillian Schwartz, Carl Michael von Hausswolff, Ken Jacobs, Mika Vainio, and Peter Rehberg (Pita).

It has also hosted theorists and researchers such as Siegfried Zielinski, Eyal Weizman, Denise Ferreira da Silva, Elizabeth A. Povinelli, Rosi Braidotti, T. J. Demos, Wendy Hui Kyong Chun, and Tony Cokes. Each edition centres on a curatorial theme and includes an international conference, performances, exhibitions, and screenings across multiple venues.

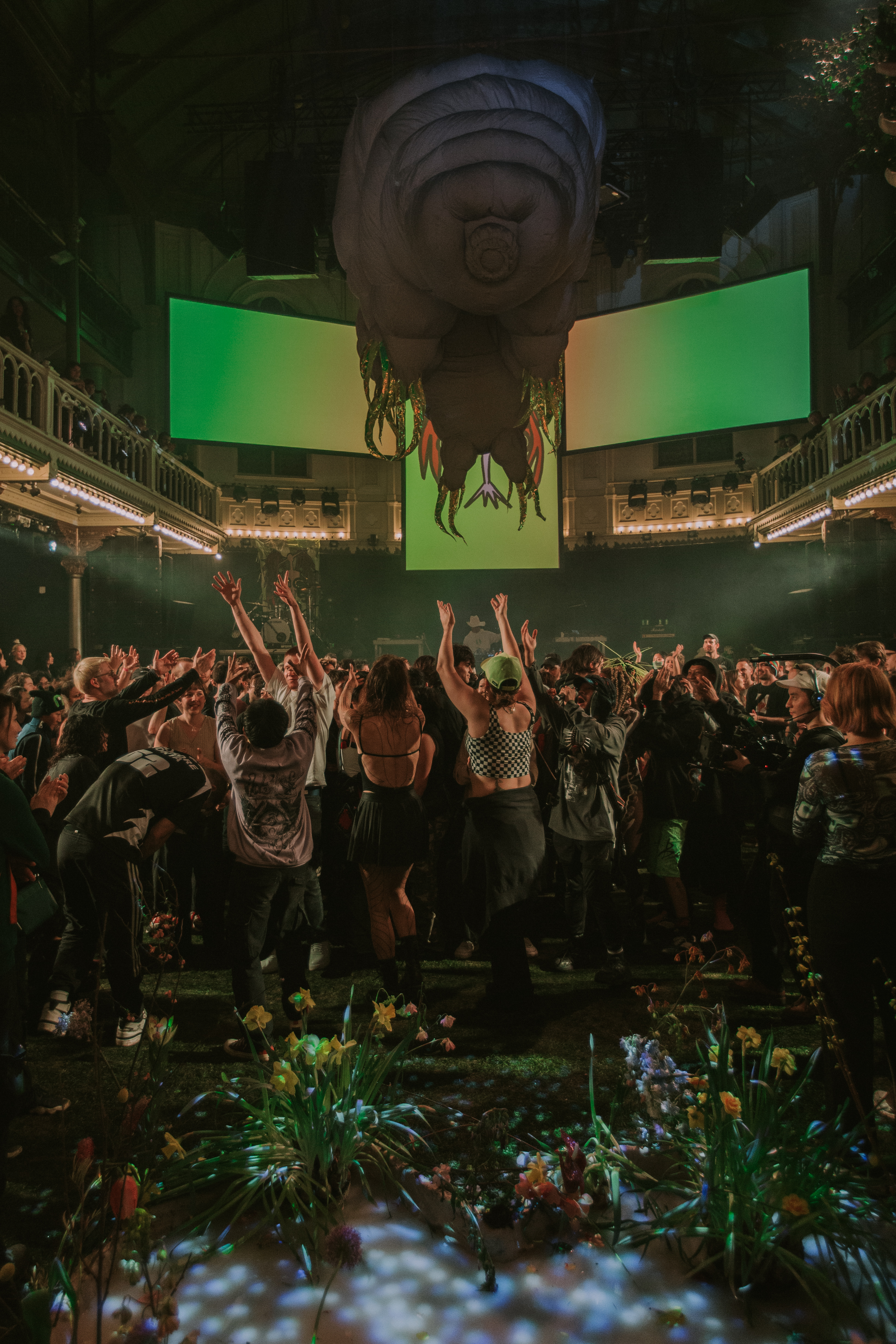
TRANCE at Paradiso in Amsterdam, during the Sonic Acts Biennial 2024. Photo by Pierre Zylstra

=== Vertical Cinema ===
Commissioned in 2013, Vertical Cinema is a series of ten commissioned large-scale, site-specific works by experimental filmmakers and audio-visual artists such as Joost Rekveld, Rosa Menkman, Makino Takashi, and Billy Roisz. Presented on 35mm film and projected vertically using a custom-built projector in vertical cinemascope, the 90-minute programme aims to challenge the dominance of the horizontal screen by rotating it lengthwise, echoing the format of smartphones while also attempting to reimagine the architecture of cinema itself. While previous innovations in film focused on colour, 3D, and IMAX, Vertical Cinema explores orientation as a potential next shift.

The project premiered at the Kontraste Festival (Dark As Light) in 2013 and had its Dutch debut at the International Film Festival Rotterdam in January 2014. Later that year, Vertical Cinema was presented at the Stedelijk Museum in Amsterdam, accompanied by an expanded programme of films and lectures.

In 2015, Vertical Cinema was featured at international festivals including the Glasgow Short Film Festival, SXSW in Austin, the STRP Biennial in Eindhoven, the Melbourne International Film Festival (MIFF), and Baltā Nakts in Riga. The project continued to tour, appearing at GEGENkino in Leipzig in 2016 and returning to Amsterdam in 2017 with four new commissioned works for the Sonic Acts Festival: The Noise of Being.

In 2024, Vertical Cinema returned with the exhibition Shifting Perspectives: Vertical Cinema at the Academy Museum of Motion Pictures in Los Angeles. To mark its tenth anniversary, the programme also toured to the Scanorama Film Festival in Lithuania.

=== Dark Ecology ===
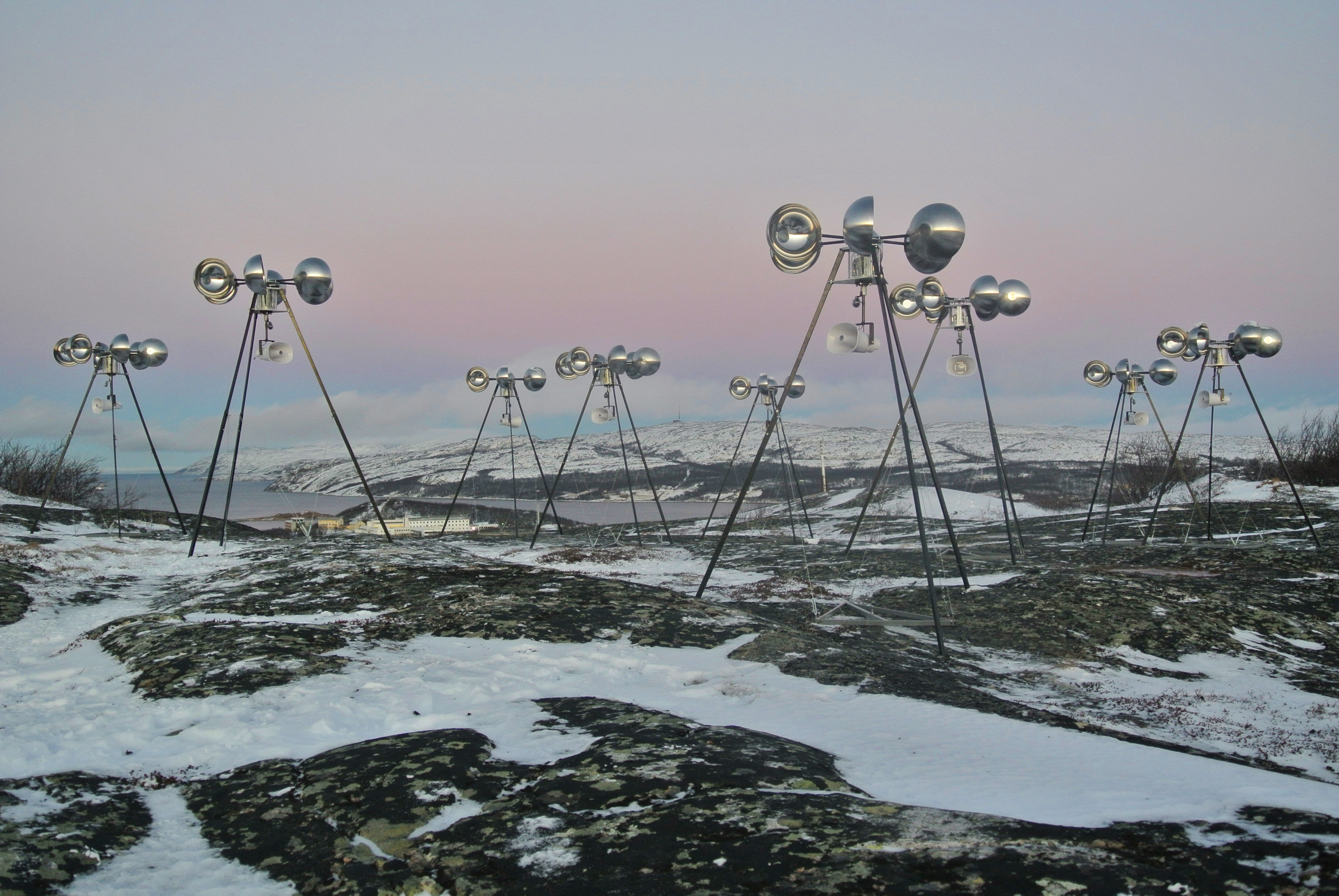
IsoScope by Joris Strijbos, a kinetic sound-and-light installation. Commissioned and co-produced by Sonic Acts and Hilde Methi for Dark Ecology 2015. Langora, Norway. Photo by Jeroen Molenaar.

Dark Ecology was a three-year art and research project based in Norway and Russia. It was initiated by Sonic Acts in collaboration with Kirkenes-based curator Hilde Methi and a network of partners. Funding for the project was provided by BarentsKult, Public Art Norway (KORO), Arts Council Norway, Creative Industries Fund NL, PNEK, Mondriaan Fund, and Finnmark County Municipality. It was inspired by philosopher Timothy Morton's concept of a "dark ecology" – which confronts the entanglement of all things, from iron ore to snowflakes. Morton's formulation argues that ecological awareness is not necessarily light, pure, or idyllic, but rather murky and unsettling.

The project involved lectures, commissions, and a guided soundwalk.

=== Kontraste ===
Kontraste, a music and art festival in and around Krems an der Donau, Austria, was curated by Sonic Acts in 2011, 2012, and 2013. Kontraste presented sonic and audio-visual experiments, contemporary music, and related art forms in a thematic, historical, and interdisciplinary context. The programme offered unconventional concerts, live performances, installations, lectures, screenings and presentations.

In October 2011, the inaugural edition of the Kontraste Festival took place, with the thematic focus Imaginary Landscapes – a reference to John Cage's early electroacoustic compositions. Exploring the ways in which sound and light might evoke non-physical environments, the event brought together artists working across experimental media. Among the contributors were Edwin van der Heide, Anthony McCall, and Gert-Jan Prins. A commissioned light design by HC Gilje accompanied all Acousmonium presentations in the Minoritenkirche, transforming the medieval church into a spatially immersive environment.

In 2012, Electric Shadows focused on the electromagnetic spectrum through films, lectures, soundwalks, and performances. Participants included Bruce McClure, Ivana Franke, Justin Bennett, and Simon Ings. Concurrently, Kunsthalle Krems hosted a Francis Picabia retrospective, linking early 20th-century avant-garde with contemporary media art.

The 2013 edition, Dark As Light, incorporated the world premiere of Vertical Cinema – a series of ten 35mm films projected vertically on a custom-built screen. The programme also included performances such as Spire, combining church organ and electronics. Installations like Franz Pomassl's Volume and Finnbogi Pétursson's OFF – 3H were included. Artists such as Morton Subotnick, Thomas Ankersmit, Phill Niblock, and Catherine Christer Hennix with The Chora(s)san Time–Court Mirage were part of the line-up.

=== Murmansk Prospekt ===
Initiated in 2019 and concluding in 2020, Murmansk Prospekt was a collaboration between Sonic Acts and Fridaymilk. It examined how artistic and speculative research could engage with underrepresented histories and identities. The project focused on supporting younger generations in Murmansk to reconsider their urban environment and explore identity through digital arts. At its end, the project concluded with commissioned works, public presentations in Murmansk and Amsterdam, and the launch of an online platform.

Two vinyl records were released in connection with the project: Kostyrko's Settlers (INVERSIA002), based on field recordings and data-driven compositional techniques, and Kühne's debut solo album, Transients I/O (INVERSIA001), which incorporates site-specific improvisation and electroacoustic approaches.

=== Re-Imagine Europe ===
In May 2017, Sonic Acts, together with ten international partners, initiated Re-Imagine Europe, a four-year project (2017–2021) responding to the social and political challenges facing the continent. Co-funded by the Creative Europe Programme of the European Union, the project encompassed artistic residencies, commissions, workshops, and symposia. It was initiated by Sonic Acts, coordinated by Paradiso, and developed in collaboration with Elevate Festival, Lighthouse, INA GRM, KONTEJNER, Bergen Kunsthall, A4, Disruption Network Lab, and Ràdio Web MACBA.

In February 2023, Re-Imagine Europe received renewed support for its second edition, New Perspectives for Action (2023–2027), a programme designed to equip and empower young Europeans through artistic practices in the face of accelerating climate change. The project brings together fourteen cultural organisations: Paradiso, Sonic Acts, Elevate Festival, INA GRM, A4, Borealis, KONTEJNER, BEK, Rupert, Disruption Network Lab, Semibreve, Parco Arte Vivente, Kontrapunkt, and Ràdio Web MACBA.

=== Night Air ===
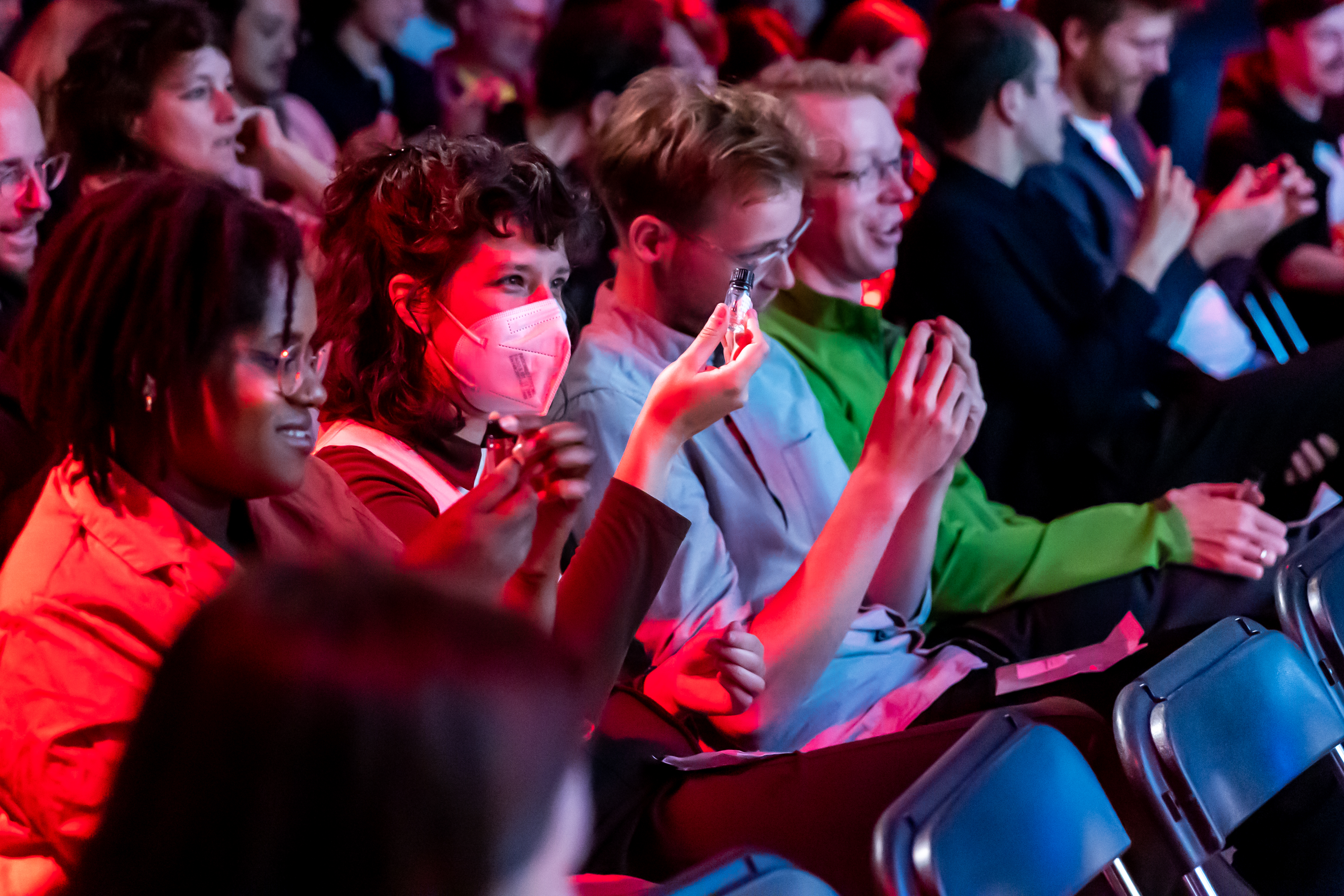
Night Air: Breathing with Clouds, OT301, Amsterdam. Photo by Sabine Van Nistelrooij.

Taking place from 2021 until 2023, during the COVID-19 pandemic and in accordance with lockdown and social distancing guidelines, Night Air was a series of online transmissions and offline events.

Night Air aimed to make pollution visible by drawing attention to the side-effects of modernity – from colonial exploitation of people and resources to the destruction of the environment and common land. The term 'night air' is derived from miasma theory (Greek for 'pollution'). Each edition featured contributions from filmmakers, artists, researchers, and activists. The programmes examined such subjects as the formulation of clouds, atmospheres, turbulence, shifting sands, nuclear unknowns, and smog.

=== Residencies and mentorship programmes ===
In 2024, Sonic Acts launched ALTERLIFE, a collaborative residency with Rupert, a center for art and education in Vilnius, Lithuania. The residency examines chemical entanglements shaped by colonial and capitalist histories. Alina Schmuch was the first ALTERLIFE resident.
