= Blank Forms =

Arts organization in New York City

Blank Forms is a not-for-profit arts organization based in New York City. It was founded by Lawrence Kumpf in 2016 as a platform for the preservation and presentation of experimental and time-based performance practices. Blank Forms frequently works with individual artists on a long-term basis in order to create "in-depth public programs and educational materials that provide a range of perspectives on inherently ephemeral practices." In 2017, the organization established Blank Forms Editions, a platform for disseminating texts and recordings related to their programming through anthologies, books, and audio releases. Blank Forms has additionally organized exhibitions by Catherine Christer Hennix, Loren Connors, Henning Christiansen, and Graham Lambkin. Although Blank Forms presents events on a largely nomadic basis through partnerships with a variety of spaces, in 2020 the organization opened their own exhibition space in Brooklyn's Clinton Hill neighborhood.

== The Maryanne Amacher Foundation ==
Blank Forms was inaugurated on March 4, 2016 with Labyrinth Gives Way To Skin, the first of a series of seminars and listening sessions presented in collaboration with The Maryanne Amacher Archive to investigate the work of the late sound artist Maryanne Amacher. Seminars, listening sessions, and concerts of Amacher's work by Blank Forms have taken place at Redcat, Artists Space, Bell Labs, The Kitchen, St. Peter's Episcopal Church, University of Pennsylvania, the Emily Harvey Foundation, and Holy Apostles and the Mediator. In 2020, Blank Forms established the Maryanne Amacher Foundation and donated the composer's archives to the New York Public Library for the Performing Arts for use by researchers and artists.

== Notable projects ==
In 2018, Blank Forms began the ongoing project of preserving and promoting the work of Swedish polymath and minimal music composer Catherine Christer Hennix. That year, Blank Forms co-curated two exhibitions of her artwork—Traversée du Fantasme at the Stedelijk Museum Amsterdam and Thresholds of Perception at Empty Gallery in Hong Kong—and released Selected Early Keyboard Works, the first volume in their series of archival releases of her unheard music. Subsequent volumes have included The Deontic Miracle: Selections from 100 Models of Hegikan Roku and Unbegrenzt. In 2019, Blank Forms anthologized Hennix's writing in the two-volume set Poësy Matters & Other Matters.

In 2019, Blank Forms announced Intermediate States, a series of listening sessions, installations, and performances of the work of the French composer Éliane Radigue. The ongoing program has included diffusions of Radigue's tape works Trilogie de la mort, Adnos I-III, Chry-ptus, and Vice-Versa, etc... in addition to touring performances of her instrumental composition Occam Ocean.

== Exhibitions ==
In 2018, Blank Forms co-curated Traversée du Fantasme, Catherine Christer Hennix's first solo museum exhibition since 1976, at the Stedelijk Museum Amsterdam. Later that year, Blank Forms occupied Artists Space's former space at 55 Walker St. in Manhattan's Tribeca neighborhood for two art exhibitions with accompanying performance programs. Wildweeds, Loren Connors' first solo art show, was supplemented with performances by the guitarist as well as by Charalambides. Freedom Is Around the Corner was the first retrospective of Danish Fluxus artist Henning Christiansen's work in America, with sculpture, painting, video, sound works, objects, works on paper, self-published magazines, and other work shown. The exhibition also included the presentation of performances by Werner Durand, Mark Harwood, Ute Wassermann, Thorbjørn Reuter Christiansen, Lucy Railton, James Rushford, Stíne Janvin, Graham Lambkin, Áine O'Dwyer, Lau Nau, and Apartment House, in addition to a screening of films by Ursula Reuter Christiansen at Anthology Film Archives. Although Blank Forms continues to work using a roving curatorial model to present performances and exhibitions without a fixed space, in 2020 the organization opened their first dedicated exhibition space in Brooklyn's Clinton Hill neighborhood. That winter, they presented Time Runs Through the Darkest Hour, an exhibition of drawings, mixed-media works on paper, and a sound piece by Graham Lambkin.

== Blank Forms Editions ==
In 2017, Blank Forms began publishing an anthology in book form, consisting of interviews, essays, poetry, newly-translated texts, and artwork and envisioned as "a platform for critical reflection and extended dialogue between scholars, artists, and other figures working within the world of experimental music and art." That same year, they released a cassette by Charlemagne Palestine, inaugurating the record label branch of Blank Forms Editions. The label has also released music by Catherine Christer Hennix, Hairbone, Loren Connors, Maryanne Amacher, Graham Lambkin & Joe McPhee, Masayuki Takayanagi New Direction Unit, Patty Waters, and Afuma. In 2019, they expanded their publishing wing by publishing three single-author books, by Loren Connors, Catherine Christer Hennix, and Joseph Jarman. In 2020, they announced the publication of a book of selected writings and interviews by Maryanne Amacher and a collection of poetry about music by Thulani Davis. In 2021, Blank Forms Editions published Alan Licht's book Common Tones: Selected Interviews with Artists and Musicians 1995-2020.

== Artists ==
Some of the artists with which Blank Forms has sustained extended relationships include:

- Afuma
- Onyx Ashanti
- Maryanne Amacher
- Henning Christiansen
- Loren Connors
- Thulani Davis
- Mark Ernestus' Ndagga Rhythm Force
- Catherine Christer Hennix
- Graham Lambkin
- Okkyung Lee
- Alan Licht
- Joe McPhee
- Áine O'Dwyer
- Charlemagne Palestine
- The Sun Ra Arkestra
- Éliane Radigue
- Marianne Schroeder
- Akio Suzuki
- Masayuki Takayanagi New Direction Unit
- Patty Waters
- Yarn/Wire
