= I Don't Wanna =

I Don't Wanna may refer to:

- I Don't Wanna (album), a 1966 album by Henry Flynt & The Insurrections
- "I Don't Wanna" (Sham 69 song) (1997)
- "I Don't Wanna" (Aaliyah song) (1999)
- "I Don't Wanna", a 1995 song by Vowel Movement from Vowel Movement
- "I Don't Wanna", a 2001 song by Keke Wyatt from Soul Sista
- "I Don't Wanna", a 2009 song by Puffy from Bring It!
- "I Don't Wanna", a song by the Pet Shop Boys from Hotspot

== See also ==
- "I Don't Want To", a song by Toni Braxton
