= Alice Maher =

Irish artist

Alice Maher RHA
- Born: 1956 (age 69–70); Kilmoyler, County Tipperary, Ireland
- Education: Crawford Municipal College of Art; University of Ulster (MA)
- Known for: Sculpture, photography, installations
- Spouse: Dermot Seymour
- Elected: Aosdána

Alice Maher RHA (born 1956) is a contemporary Irish artist working in a variety of media, including sculpture, photography and installation.

== Education ==
Maher was born in Kilmoyler, near Bansha, County Tipperary, and received her early education at Ballydrehid National School and at Coláiste Chríost Rí, Cahir. She later graduated from the University of Limerick and the Crawford College of Art in Cork. Then she undertook an MA at the University of Ulster, Belfast in 1985 and 1986. Maher spent time in San Francisco Art Institute in 1986 as a Fulbright Scholar.

== Career ==
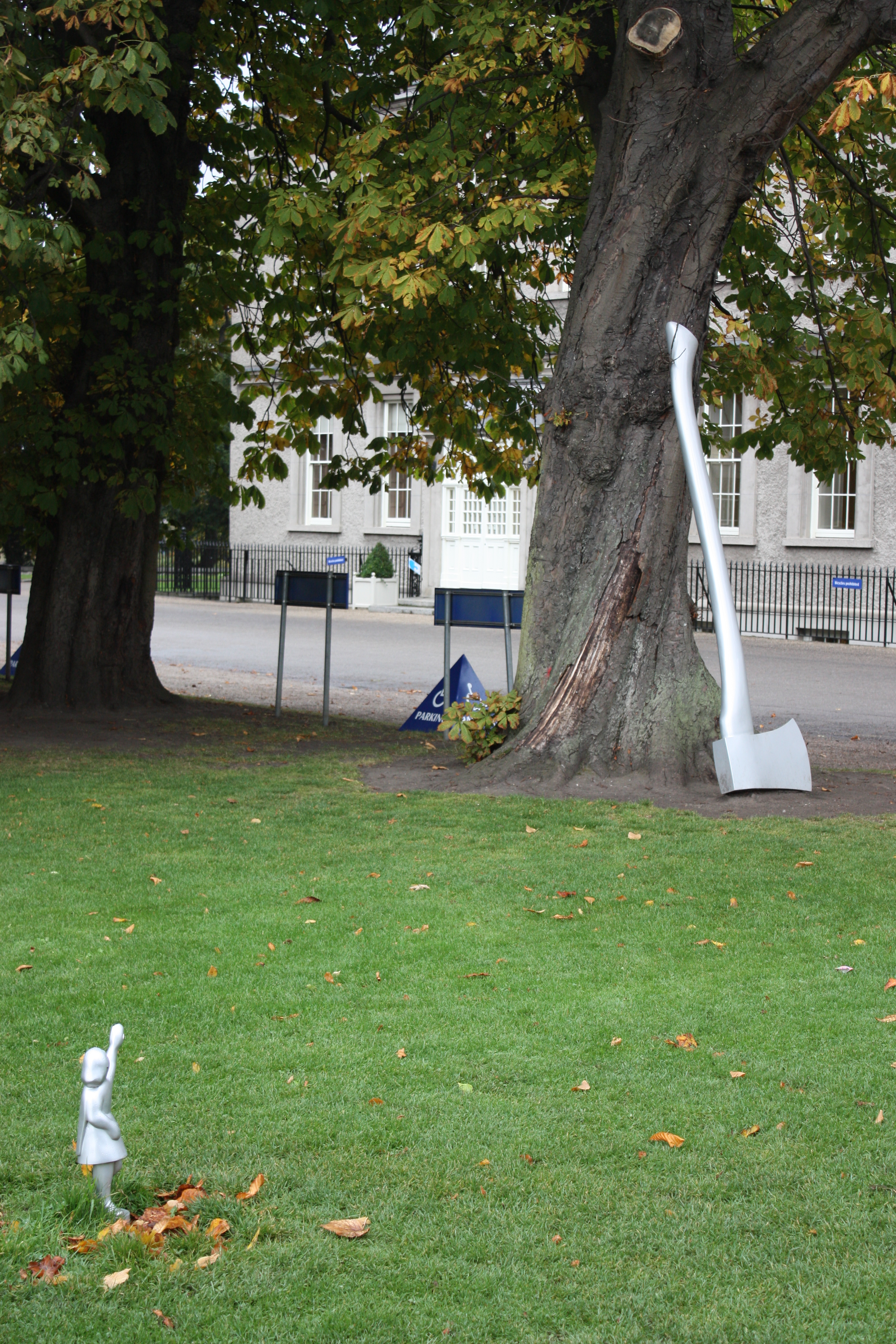
The Axe (and the Waving Girl) by Alice Maher, 2003

Maher works in a range of media, often from outside the tradition of fine art and more from the natural and domestic world, such as hair, nettles, bees and thorns. She has explored the themes of childhood and death, such as Mnemosyne, 2003, wherein she creates a bedlike structure constructed from refrigerator coils; when the coils become frosty they gleam a luminous white sheen. She is interested in how identities, particularly gendered identities, are constructed by history and culture.

In 2026, Maher was selected to participate in the main international exhibition of the 61st Venice Biennale, titled In Minor Keys and curated by Koyo Kouoh. Held in the Arsenale di Venezia, her presentation included a reconstruction of her 1996 outdoor installation Les Filles d'Ouranos alongside new drawing and sculptural works titled The Sibyls (2025). Her contribution also featured The Map (2021), a monumental collaborative textile work created alongside artist Rachel Fallon.

=== Exhibitions ===
Maher's work was the subject of a survey show at the Irish Museum of Modern Art, IMMA, in 2012 titled Becoming. The exhibition took place in the IMMA's temporary location at Earlsfort Terrace as the museum was undergoing renovations at the time. Maher represented Ireland at the São Paulo Art Biennial in 1994.

=== Collaborations ===
Maher has collaborated with artists from a range of disciplines. She collaborated with the composer Trevor Knight since 1999. Knight has produced soundtracks for her animated videos. Visitant, a live show combining dance, music and visual art, was a collaboration between Maher, Knight, the Butoh dancer Gyohei Zaitsu and musician Áine O'Dwyer. Visitant was performed at the Project Arts Centre in 2014.

Maher's film Cassandra's Necklace, produced for her retrospective exhibition at IMMA in 2015, was based on an unpublished script by Irish writer Anne Enright and features the actress Charlie Murphy.

In 2018, Maher collaborated with the poet Doireann Ní Ghríofa on the book Nine Silences published by Salvage Press.

=== Collections ===
- Berry Dress, 1994, The Irish Museum of Modern Art, Dublin
- The Arts Council of Ireland including
- Nettle Coat (1996)
- The Crawford Gallery, Cork, including
- Irish Dancers (1992)
- Fairytale Wall (2002), Special Investigation Unit, Level 2, Royal Victoria Hospital, Belfast

== Bibliography ==
- Maher, Alices, Reservoir (Dublin: Roads Publishing, 2014) was a collection of the artist's sketchbooks
- Allen Randolph, Jody. "Alice Maher, August 2009". Close to the Next Moment: Interviews from a Changing Ireland. Manchester: Carcanet, 2010.
- Barber, Fiona. Familiar [essay]. Dublin: Douglas Hyde Gallery; Derry: Orchard Gallery, 1995.
- Bourne, Cecile. Familiar [interview]. Dublin: Douglas Hyde Gallery; Derry: Orchard Gallery, 1995.
- Deepwell, Katy. "Alice Maher". Dialogues: Women Artists from Ireland. London: IB Tauris, 2005.
- Dickinson, Sheila. "Alice Maher, Rood", Circa Magazine (Winter 2005), No. 114, pp. 86 – 87.
- Ruane, Mebd. "A Sting in the Tail". Profile: Alice Maher. Cork: Gandon Editions, 1998. 5–10.
