= Pedro Déniz =

Spanish interdisciplinary artist

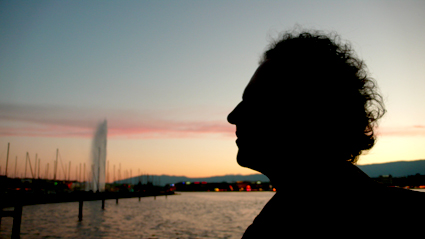
- Pedro Déniz
- Born: Pedro J. Déniz Acosta; 1 August 1964 (age 61); Las Palmas de Gran Canaria, Canary Islands, Spain
- Known for: installation art, art photography, video art, art intervention, performance art, visual poetry, Graphic design

Pedro J. Déniz Acosta (born 1964, Santa Brígida, Las Palmas de Gran Canaria, Canary Islands, Spain) is a Spanish interdisciplinary artist who has developed art projects and experiences ranging from the objectual art to installation art, from art photography to video art, cultivating art intervention, performance art, visual poetry and graphic design.

== Biography ==
In 1998 inaugurated the project La Puente, which represents a turning point in his work, opening channels of communication and artistic action by launching bottles at the height of the zero meridian message wrapper made by different artists. In 2002 his first exhibition in the Hall of San Antonio Abad from Centro Atlántico de Arte Moderno, CAAM. That same year, presented along the Moroccan artist Mounir Fatmi the performance Power line - Imagen y poder in Espacio C Contemporary Art, Camargo, Santander. The two artists collaborate again a year later at the Second International Contemporary Art Hybrid Spaces, Osorio, Teror, Gran Canaria with the performance Hybrid Spaces, both actions intended to place the viewer at a point of reflection on the cultural frictions. As part of Performando, meeting of performances held in Las Palmas de Gran Canaria running performance Paper Memories by building a wall through fragments of the press in order to question the information that we relegate the media. In October 2003, includes a photographic installation called Welcome in Contemporary African Photography Biennale, 5èmes Rencontres Africaines de la Photographie, Bamako, Mali. The same year, Dulce-sal exhibits a photographic installation based on migration issues included in the collective project of the Aula del Mestizaje, University of Las Palmas de Gran Canaria. The artist Ricardo Basbaum (Brazil), Robin Rhode (South Africa) and Pedro Déniz showed the group exhibition called 3 Scenarios, the installation was from March to April in the Hall of San Antonio Abad del Centro Atlántico de Arte Moderno CAAM in 2005. One of his visual poems selected for the exhibition Disagreements. About art, politics and public sphere in the Spanish State, experimental poetry section at the Barcelona Museum of Contemporary Art MACBA. That same year he presented his video May day in the context of the 6th Biennial Photography in Bamako, Mali. During the months of April and May 2006 participated in the second part of Violencias Urban(istic)a to the MAPFRE Foundation in Las Palmas de Gran Canaria and Santa Cruz de Tenerife, Canary Islands Government. That year also presented at the Biennial of Dakar his work Ajuy within the multimedia project Meeting Point. October to December 2007 presented in the Gallery of the Metropolitan Autonomous University (UAM) in Mexico City Transit, the territories of the reality with artists Jose Domingo Diaz and Luzardo who seek challenge his works the concept of the reality imposed by the dominant culture. In April 2008 he participated with the performance Jappy New Year in the Circo Project, an international event and Audiovisual Performance, Havana, Cuba. Under the Interaction Meeting organized by Gran Canaria Espacio Digital introduces its performance Transit/Blindness where it investigates the loss of the root causes by migration. In 2009 exhibited at the 10th Havana Biennial interactive installation Trench of thought where Déniz reflected through his work the fragility of thought plural. In 2016 the Galerie St. Gertrude, Hamburg, realized in cooperation with the artist the first exhibition in Germany.
