= HC Gilje =

Norwegian artist (born 1969)

HC Gilje (born 1969) is a Norwegian artist who works with realtime environments, installations, live performance, set design and single channel video.

Gilje has presented his work through different channels throughout the world: in concert-venues, theater and cinema venues, galleries, festivals and through several international DVD releases, including 242.pilots live in Bruxelles on the New York label Carpark and Cityscapes on the Paris-label Lowave.

He was a member of the video-impro trio 242.pilots, and was also the visual motor of dance company Kreutzerkompani.

In 2006, Gilje initiated the research project “Conversations with Spaces” where he explores how audiovisual technology can be used to transform, create, expand, amplify and interpret physical spaces.

He is also the developer of the free Video Projection Tool (VPT), a software for mapping video onto physical objects and surfaces.

== Biography ==
HC Gilje graduated from the Trondheim Academy of Fine Art in 1999, and later moved to Berlin to participate in the International Studio Programme of Künstlerhaus Bethanien, Berlin. He stayed in Berlin until 2006 before he moved back to Norway.

Gilje was involved in several dance/theatre projects in the period 1997 to 2006, primarily with Kreutzerkompani which he formed together with choreographer Eva-Cecilie Richardsen. He returned to theatre in 2010 to do set and video design for an adaptation of Tarjei Vesaas´ Fuglane at Trøndelag Teater.

Gilje toured extensively with different live video projects from 1999 to 2007. Apart from 242.pilots, he collaborated with several musicians, composers, and improvisers, including Justin Bennett, Yannis Kyriakides, Kelly Davis, Maja Ratkje and Jazzkammer (John Hegre/Lasse Marhaug).

From about 1995 to 2005 he made a series of experimental videos, several of them results of his live collaborations. His last video so far is Night for Day which was a collaboration with Jazzkammer based on material shot in Tokyo, a video which later appeared on Gilje's DVD release "Cityscapes".

Since 2005 Gilje has focused mainly on installations involving projection, light and sound. Some of his recent installations include Wind-up Birds (a network of mechanical woodpeckers), blink (projection of light into empty spaces),circle (a light projected object) and puls (light installation commissioned for Bybanen metro in Bergen).

== Selected installations ==
- Shadowgrounds, 2001
- nodio, 2005
- drifter, 2006
- soundpockets 1&2, 2007
- wind-up birds, 2008
- shift, 2008
- blink (projection), 2009
- blink (light-shadow), 2009
- snitt, 2010
- light space modulator, 2011
- circle, 2011
- Revolver, 2013

== Selected videos ==
- H.K.mark1, 1998
- evil is going on, 2001
- stacking of different natures, 2002: music video for the electronica duo Information.
- crossings, 2002
- shiva, 2003: music by Kelly Davis.
- voice, 2003: collaboration with composer/performer Maja Ratkje
- night for day, 2004: collaboration with Jazzkammer
- sunblind, 2004: collaboration with Tim Hecker

== Selected dance-theatre productions ==
- Hollow Creature: Tigerhagen (2000–2001)
- Kreutzerkompani:synk (2002–2006)
- Kreuzterkompami:elevator (2003–2005)
- Kreutzerkompani:twinn (2004)
- Kreutzerkompani:irre (2006)
- Trøndelag Teater: Fuglane (2010)

== DVD releases ==
- "242.pilots live in Bruxelles", (DVD, Carpark Records, cprk21, 2002)
- "Cityscapes", (DVD, Lowave (2005), includes H.K.mark1, crossings, shiva and Night for day.
