= Mounir Fatmi =

Moroccan artist

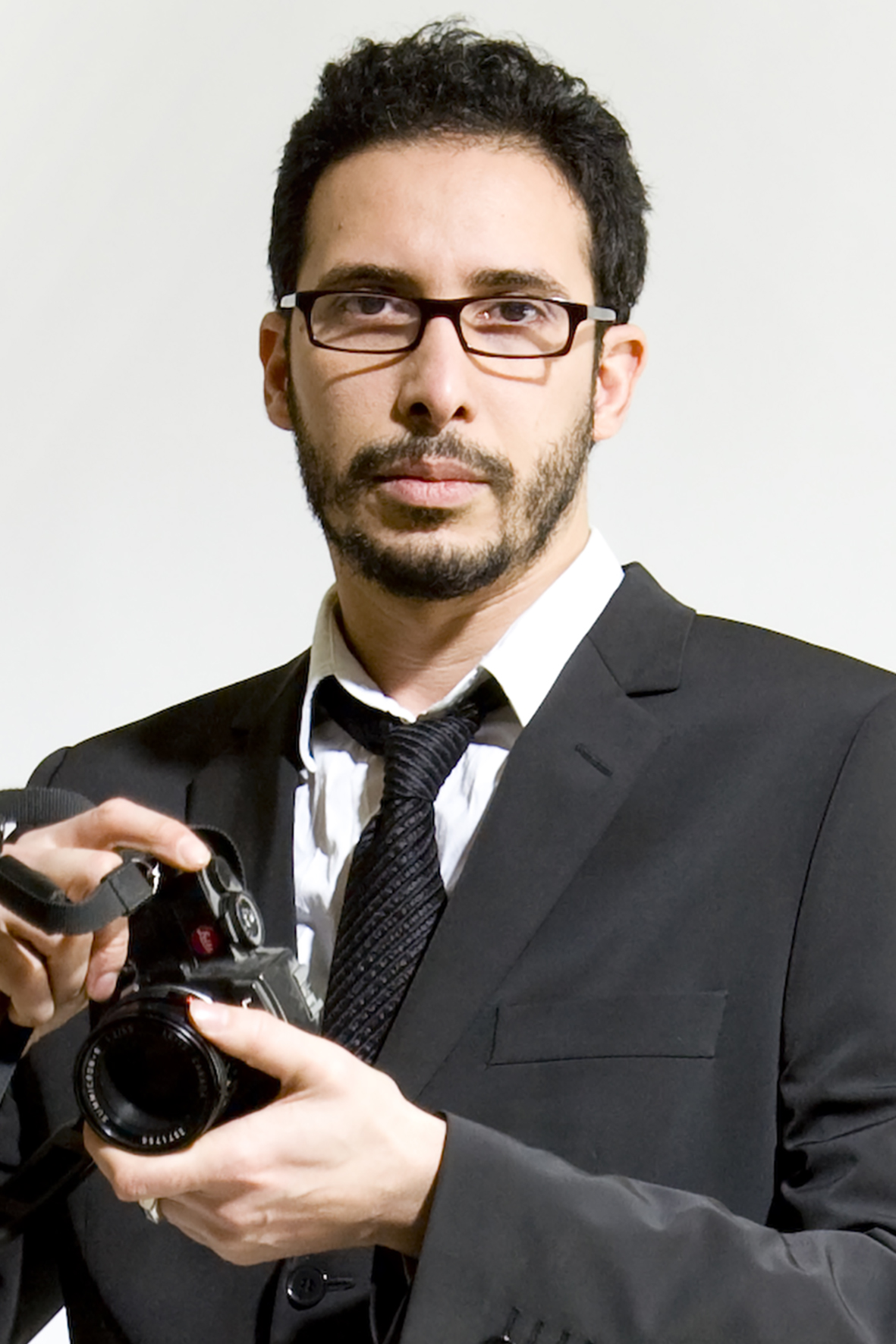
- Mounir Fatmi
- Born: 1970 (age 55–56); Tangier, Morocco
- Known for: Contemporary art

Mounir Fatmi (born 1970 in Tangier, Morocco) is a Moroccan artist. His multimedia practice encompasses video, installation, drawing, painting and sculpture, and he works with obsolete materials.

== Biography ==
Born in the city of Tangiers, he spent a majority of his time the neighborhood of Casabarata. This neighborhood was known as one of the poorest in the city. He would often spend his time in the flea market, where his mother made a living by selling children's clothing. It was in this very environment that he found himself surrounded by commonly used objects and waste products.

As a young boy, he traveled to Rome where he studied at the free school of nude drawing and engraving at the Academy of Arts, and then later at the School of Fine Arts in Casablanca, Morocco (1989), School of Fine Arts, Rome, Italy (1991), and finally studied at the Rijksakademie in Amsterdam.

In 2006, he won the Uriöt prize, the grand prize of the Dakar Biennial and the Cairo Biennial Award in 2010.

=== Professional career ===
==== 1990–1995 ====
In 1993, Fatmi received first prize at the Third Biennial of Young Moroccan Painting, for the "Fragile / Communication" series and met Catherine David.

In 1995, he becomes known outside of Morocco from his work with videos. He was selected at the International Videokunstpreis at the ZKM3 in Karlsruhe.

==== 1996–2000 ====
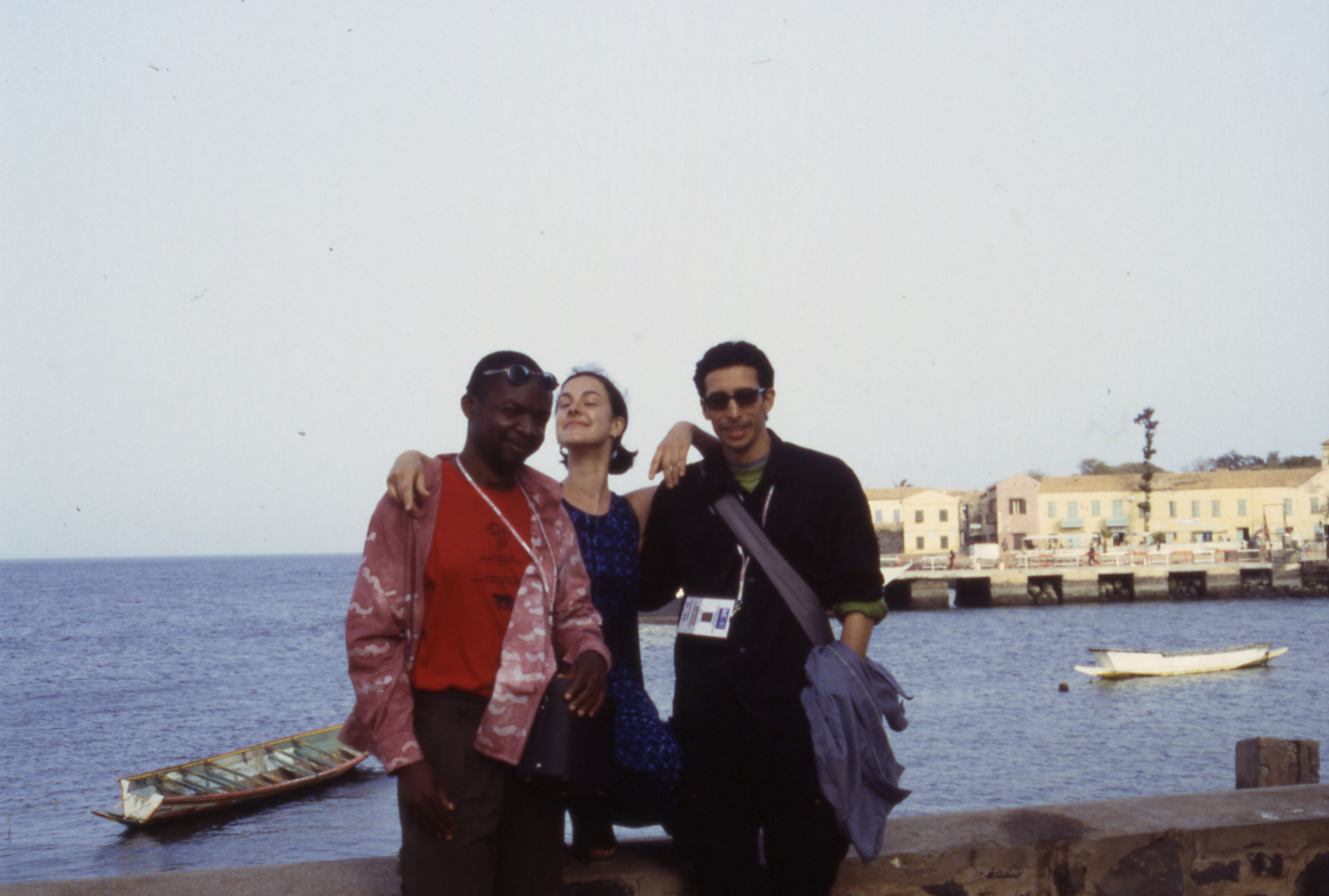
Fatmi at Dakar Biennale in 2000 (with Goddy Leye and Sandrine Dole)

In 1999, he met curator Jean-Louis Froment and participated in the exhibition "L'objet désorienté" at the Museum of Decorative Arts in Paris, where he made the sculpture Connections.

==== 2001–2010 ====
In 2004, Fatmi was invited by Simon Njami and Jean-Hubert Martin to participate in the exhibition "Africa remix" at the Kunstpalast museum in Düsseldorf, the Hayward Gallery in London, the Georges Pompidou Center in Paris, the Mori art museum in Tokyo, the Moderna museum in Stockholm, and the Johannesburg Art Gallery in Johannesburg.

Fatmi held his solo exhibition "Fuck architects, chapter I" at the Lombard project in New York.

==== 2011–present ====
Fatmi began experiencing censorship in 2011.

His work Modern Times, a History of the Machine is selected for the Jameel Prize 3 of the Victoria & Albert Museum in London, in 2013, and is exhibited in group shows related to this award at the Hermitage-Kazan Exhibition Center, the Moscow Manege, the Sharjah Museum of Islamic Civilization, and the National Library of Singapore.

In 2016, he launched The Exile Pavilion and organized the first stage at the National Archives Museum in Paris. He was selected for the exhibition "Fundamental" at the Fifth Mediations Biennale of Poznan and for the Triennial of Setouchi Awashima Community Area in Japan. In 2017, he participates in the exhibition The Absence of Paths: 1st Tunisian Pavilion at the 57th Venice Biennale.

== Work ==
Fatmi's videos, installations, drawings, paintings and sculptures are influenced by issues related to identity, religion, multiculturalism, consumerism, the ambiguities of language, and the importance of communication. He creates political art through the deconstruction of dead media, which represents the crumbling industrial and consumerist civilization. In his work, he uses materials such as antenna cables, copier machines, old typewriters, VHS tapes, saw blades, books, and flags, in order to create compelling compositions.

Fatmi's installations and films have the specificity to be produced with archaic and outdated material, such as VHS tapes. Many of Fatmi's works are seen as subversive, such as his Brainteaser for moderate Muslims, a series of Rubik's Cubes painted in black with white stripes to imitate the Kaaba in Mecca. As a reaction to the Arab Spring, he exhibited The Lost Spring.

== Awards ==
- Shortlisted Jameel Prize 3, Victoria and Albert Museum, London, 2014
- Uriöt prize (Amsterdam)
- Grand Prix Léopold Sédar Senghor (2006)
- Cairo Biennale Prize (2010)

== Exhibitions ==
=== Select solo shows ===
Mounir Fatmi has had many solo shows to showcase his work, starting in 2006 up until 2021. All listed below have been at galleries, museums or institutions across the world.

2021

- “The Observer Effect” at the ADN Galeria in Barcelona
- “Heavier than Words” at the Conrads Gallery in Berlin

2018

- “Fragmented Memory” at the Goodman Gallery in Johannesburg
- “(IM)possible Union” at Analix Forever, in Geneva
- “Darkening Process” at Analix Forever in Geneva
- “Inside the Fire Circle” at Lawrie Shabibi in Dubaï
- “Le Pavillon de l’exil” at the Galerie Delacroix in Tangier
- “The Index and The marchine” at the ADN Platform in San Cugat del Vallès

2015

- “Modern Times” at Miami Beach Urban Studios Gallery in Miami
- “Art et Patrimoine: C'est encore la nuit, Prison Qara” at the Institut Français de Meknès in Morocco

2014

- “They were blind, they only saw images” at Galerie Yvon Lambert in Paris
- “The Kissing Circles” at Analix Forever in Geneva
- “Art of War” at the ADN Platform in Sant Cugat del Vallès

2013

- “Intersections” at the Keitelman Gallery in Brussels
- “Post Tenebras Lux” at the Festival A-Part in Les Baux-de-Provence
- “Le Voyage de Claude Lévi-Strauss” at the Institut Français in Casablanca

2012

- “Kissing Circles” at the Shoshana Wayne Gallery in Santa Monica
- “Suspect Language” at the Goodman Gallery in Cape Town
- “Between the lines” at Galerie Hussenot in Paris
- “The Angel's Black Leg” at the Galerie Conrads in Düsseldorf

2010

- “The Beautiful Language” at the Galerie Ferdinand van Dieten in Amsterdam
- “Seeing is believing” at the Galerie Hussenot in Paris
- “Connexion 02” at the Galerie Delacroix in Tanger

2007

- “Sans histoire” at Musée Picasso - La guerre et la paix in Vallauris
- “Fuck Architects : Chapter I” at the Lombard-Freid Projects in New York

2006

- “Tête dure / Hard head” at the Bank Galerie in Paris
- “Ecrans noirs” at the Centre d'art contemporain intercommunal in Istres
- “Comprendra bien qui comprendra le dernier” at the Centre d'art contemporain Le Parvis in Ibos

=== Select group exhibitions ===
Mounir Fatmi has participated in many group exhibitions, starting in 2017 up until 2021.

2021

- Setouchi Asia Forum 2021: Artists’ Breath Live (Setouchi)
- The Slipstream: Reflection, Resilience, and Resistance in the Art of Our Time (New York)
- Tradition Interrupted (Harrisburg)
- Weatherproof (Amsterdam)
- Redefining the Trend-Histories in the making (London)
- Lady Dior As Seen As By (Moscow)
- Seeing & Perceiving (Dhahran)
- Moroccan Trilogy (Madrid)
- Lady Dior As Seen By (Berlin)
- Memory of Defence: Physical and Mental Architectures (Palma)
- Under Construction - part one and two (Dubai)
- Rêves d’été en monochrome (Geneva)
- Art Front Selection 2021 spring (Tokyo)
- Tradition Interrupted (Charleston)

2020

- Our world is burning (Paris)
- The Pope (Krakow)

2018

- Echigo Tsumari Art Triennale (Niigata)

2017

- Tunisian Pavilion, The Absence of Paths (Venice)
- 7eme Biennale d'Architecture de Shenzhen (Shenzhen)
- Contemporary Creation and Social Dynamics (Dakar)

=== Publications ===
- Mounir Fatmi (Le Parvis centre d'art contemporain, 2006)
- Hard Head (Lowave, 2006)
- Fuck the Architect (Lowave, 2009)
- Megalopolis (AKBank Sanat, 2010)
- Ghosting (studio mounir fatmi, 2011)
- Suspect Language (Skira Editore, 2012)
- The Kissing Precise (LaMuette, 2014)
- History is not mine (Rencontres de Bamako, 2015)
- Survival Signs (SF publishing, 2017)
- The Missing Show (SF publishing, 2018)
- 180° Behind Me, mounir fatmi, SF Publishing (2019)
- The Day of the Awakening, mounir fatmi, SF Publishing (2019)
- The White Matter, SF Publishing (2019)
- The Process, SF Publishing (2019)
- The Index and The Machine, (2020)
- Keeping Faith, Keeping Drawing (2020)
- Transition State (2020)
- Peripheral Vision (2020)
- Fragmented Memory (2020)
- A Savage Mind (2020)
- They were blind, they only saw images (2020)
- Inside the Fire Circle (2020)
- Suspect Language (2020)
- Ghosting (2020)
- Kissing Circles (2020)
- History is not mine (2020)
- Intersections (2020)
- Oriental Accident (2020)
- Seeing is Believing (2020)
- Light and Fire (2021)
- Art of War (2021)
- Something is Possible (2021)
- Between the Lines (2021)
- Fuck Architects: Chapter 1 (2021)
- Hard Head (2021)
- In Search of Paradise (2021)
