= I Don't Wanna (album) =

Compilation album by Henry Flynt & the Insurrections
- Released: 2004
- Recorded: 1966
- Genre: Experimental rock; garage rock
- Length: 32:39
- Label: Locust

I Don't Wanna is an archival album released in 2004 on Locust Music consisting of demos recorded in 1966 by Henry Flynt & the Insurrections, a protest group led by Flynt on lead vocals and electric guitar, with Walter De Maria on drums, Art Murphy on keyboards, and Paul Breslin on upright bass.

== Background ==
Henry Flynt & the Insurrections were led by musician and philosopher Henry Flynt, who was a classically trained violinist. Flynt, a native of North Carolina, was living in New York City during the 1960s and became part of the early "Fluxus" movement, becoming friends with the avant-garde artists and musicians living there at the time, including La Monte Young.

In September 1966, Flynt briefly joined the Velvet Underground as a stand-in for John Cale, performing on violin with a signature hillbilly-influenced sound. Cale had been suffering from an illness and so he invited Flynt to briefly replace him. Around the same time, Lou Reed gave Flynt his first guitar lessons.

Flynt had been interested in writing songs with political messages, inspired by Bob Dylan's "Subterranean Homesick Blues", so he began assembling an act of his own influenced by rock music and blues. The Insurrections started as a duo with Flynt as the vocalist and electric guitarist. He was accompanied by Walter De Maria, a sculptor and friend, on drums, who had formerly played in the Primitives, a band that included Lou Reed and John Cale.

The Insurrections specialized in a kind of agitprop approach to topical songs as they evolved into a larger group, eventually adding jazz musician Paul Breslin on upright bass and organist Art Murphy, and taking the name Henry Flynt & the Insurrections. Many of the band's songs were highly satirical, rife with references to topics such as "napalm", "Uncle Sam", and "CIA-backed coups". They recorded songs onto rehearsal demos in 1966, but, due to Flynt and DeMaira's wariness of commercial success, the band broke up shortly thereafter.

== Music ==
The opening cut on I Don't Wanna is "Uncle Sam Do" an anti-war song against US involvement in the Vietnam War. The second track, "Goodbye Wall St.", takes dead-center aim at capitalism. The lyrics to "Go Down" depict a picket line in which the target of anger is not only directed at the war and social inequality, but seemingly provides blank slate for whatever particular grievance that comes to mind. "Jumping", though not topical, is the most experimental cut stylistically, featuring a heavily reverbed high-pitched saxophone accompanied manic guitar strumming. The penultimate cut is the album's title-track, "I Don't Wanna", which is a different version of "Uncle Sam Do". The album concludes with the improvisation "Dreams Away".

== Reception ==
Professional ratings
Review scores
Source	Rating
AllMusic	4/5 stars
Pitchfork	7.4/10

In Records Ruin the Landscape: John Cage, the Sixties, and Sound Recording, David Grubbs describes the Henry Flynt & the Insurrections sound as "garage-punk protest".

I Don't Wanna was listed as Julian Cope's Album of the Month, not long after its release. Cope comments: "This album reveals such an astonishing quicksilver energy of interplay between the guitar and drums that it all sounds contemporary even today". Eugene Chadbourne wrote a generally positive review for AllMusic, pointing out some weaker cuts, but he states that "on the whole the nine tracks here add up to a vision of rock music that most listeners will be perfectly happy to have in their heads for a while".

Andy Beta of Pitchfork stated, "Whether you hear his strumming patterns as inept or outsider, goony or genius, Henry Flynt sucks in all aspects of time for his sound. He gets that chilling thwack of Dock Boggs' bailing-wire blues from the 20s, the Fugs-frenzy and Godz-idiocy of the Lower East Side in the mid-60s, and anticipates Bob Log III's 90s catgut caterwauling. The sneer and stumble that constitute protest songs like 'Uncle Sam Do' and 'Goodby Wall St.' tremble outside of time. De Maria, far from the cleanliness of the gallery scene, pounds and splats in the muck, his ideas of dumped garbage can as snare drum still heard in the trashy thud of Gibson Brothers, Pussy Galore, and the In the Red label's entire catalog".

== Track listing ==
All tracks are written by Henry Flynt.

No.	Title	Length
1.	"Uncle Sam Do"	2:52
2.	"Goodbye Wall St."	2:59
3.	"Go Down"	2:55
4.	"Corona Del Mar"	3:00
5.	"Missionary Stew"	4:30
6.	"Jumping"	3:03
7.	"Sky Turned Red"	2:33
8.	"I Don't Wanna"	3:18
9.	"Dreams Away"	7:29

== Musicians ==
- Henry Flynt – vocals and electric guitar
- Walter De Maria – drums
- Art Murphy – keyboards
- Paul Breslin – upright bass
