= Maryanne Amacher =

American composer and musical artist

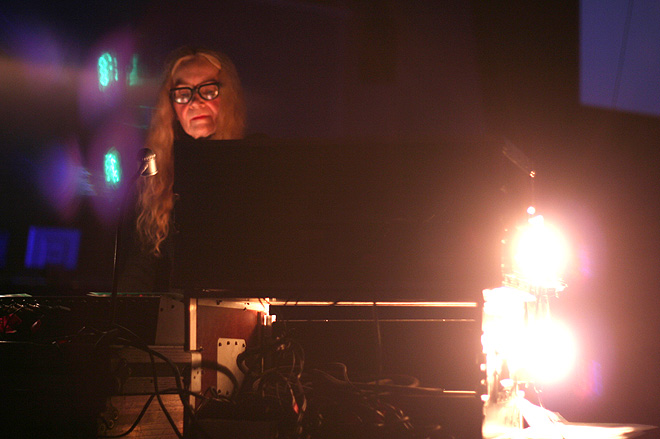
- Amacher in 2006

Background information
- Born: February 25, 1938; Kane, Pennsylvania, U.S.
- Died: October 22, 2009 (aged 71) Rhinebeck, New York, U.S.
- Genres: Electronic music, experimental music noise music
- Occupations: Composer, installation artist
- Instrument: Piano
- Website: www.maryanneamacher.org

Maryanne Amacher (February 25, 1938 – October 22, 2009) was an American composer and installation artist. She is known for working extensively with a family of psychoacoustic phenomena called auditory distortion products (also known as distortion product otoacoustic emissions and combination tones), in which the ears themselves produce audible sound.

== Biography ==
Amacher was born in Kane, Pennsylvania, to an American nurse and a Swiss freight train worker. An only child, she grew up playing the piano. Amacher left Kane to attend the University of Pennsylvania on a full scholarship where she received a B.F.A in 1964. While there she studied composition with George Rochberg and Karlheinz Stockhausen.

She also studied composition in Salzburg, Austria, and Dartington, England. Subsequently, she did graduate work in acoustics and computer science at the University of Illinois at Urbana-Champaign.

While in residence at the University of Buffalo as part of their CCPA program, in 1967, she created CITY-LINKS, WBFO Buffalo, a 28-hour piece using 8 microphones in different parts of the city, broadcast live by radio station WBFO. There were 21 other pieces in the "City Links" series, and more information can be found in the brochure for an exhibition on the series by Ludlow 38 in NYC (available on their website). A common feature was the use of dedicated, FM radio quality telephone (0–15,000 Hz range) lines to connect the sound environments of different sites into the same space, a very early example of what is now called "telematic performance" which preceded much more famous examples by Max Neuhaus, amongst others. (Neuhaus himself helped Amacher organise an event called In City in October 1967 in Buffalo.)

Her major pieces have almost exclusively been site-specific, often using many loudspeakers to create what she called "structure borne sound", differentiating it from "airborne sound". By using many diffuse sound sources (either not in the space or speakers facing at the walls or floors) she would create the psychoacoustic illusions of sound shapes or "presence". Amacher's early work is best represented in three series of multimedia installations produced in the United States, Europe, and Japan: the sonic telepresence series, "City Links 1–22" (1967– ); the architecturally staged "Music for Sound-Joined Rooms" (1980– ); and the "Mini-Sound Series" (1985– ) a new multimedia form she created that is unique in its use of architecture and serialized narrative.

She was invited while doing a fellowship at the Harvard University and the Massachusetts Institute of Technology by John Cage to work on several projects. The collaboration resulted with a storm soundtrack for Cage's multimedia "Lecture on the Weather" (1975) and a work on sound environment "Close Up" for a 10-hour solo voice work for Cage "Empty Words" (1978). She also produced, alongside other works, "Torse" for Merce Cunningham from 1974 to 1980.

Amacher worked extensively with a set of psychoacoustic phenomena known as 'auditory distortion products'; put simply: sounds generated inside the ear that are clearly audible to the hearer. These tones have a long history in music theory and scientific research, and are still the object of disagreement and debate. In music, they are most commonly known by the name of 'combination tones', 'difference tones', and sometimes 'Tartini tones' (after the violinist Giuseppe Tartini, who is credited with discovering them). Amacher herself termed them 'ear tones' until 1992, when she discovered the work of David T. Kemp and Thomas Gold and began referring to them by the psychoacoustical terminology of 'otoacoustic emissions'. It has since become clear that some of the sounds Amacher, and indeed all musicians who have exploited this phenomenon, were generating can be attributed to a particular family of otoacoustic emissions known as 'distortion product otoacoustic emissions' (DPOAE). Occurring in response to two pure tones presented simultaneously to the ear, these tones appear to localise in or around the head, as though there were a 'tiny loudspeaker inside the ear'. Amacher was the first to systematically explore the musical use of these phenomena using electroacoustic sound technologies. The subtitle of her first Tzadik Records album Sound Characters (Making the Third Ear) is a reference to them. She describes the subjective experience of these phenomena in the following passage:

When played at the right sound level, which is quite high and exciting, the tones in this music will cause your ears to act as neurophonic instruments that emit sounds that will seem to be issuing directly from your head ... (my audiences) discover they are producing a tonal dimension of the music which interacts melodically, rhythmically, and spatially with the tones in the room. Tones 'dance' in the immediate space of their body, around them like a sonic wrap, cascade inside ears, and out to space in front of their eyes ... Do not be alarmed! Your ears are not behaving strange or being damaged! ... these virtual tones are a natural and very real physical aspect of auditory perception, similar to the fusing of two images resulting in a third three dimensional image in binocular perception ... I want to release this music which is produced by the listener ...

Over the years she received several major commissions in the United States and Europe with occasional work in Asia and Central and South America. Amacher received a 1998 Foundation for Contemporary Arts Grants to Artists Award. In 2005, she was awarded the Prix Ars Electronica (the Golden Nica) in the "Digital Musics" category for her project "TEO! A sonic sculpture". In 2009 she was invited for Brückenmusik, Cologne. At the time of her death she had been working three years on a 40-channel piece commissioned by the Experimental Media and Performing Arts Center in Troy, New York.

Maryanne Amacher has been an important influence for composers such as Rhys Chatham and Thurston Moore. For the last decade of her life she taught at the Bard College MFA program.

In 2020, The Music and Recorded Sound Division of The New York Public Library acquired Amacher's archives.

In 2020, the Maryanne Amacher Foundation was established by a group of her close friends, peers, and collaborators, coordinated by Blank Forms, to promote and preserve Amacher’s work and legacy. The Foundation organizes exploratory seminars, public programs, research opportunities, and publications to broaden public understanding of her contributions to sound art and experimental music.

== Discography and exhibits ==
Multimedia Installations (all works in progress)

- 1967–: City Links nos 1-22
- 1980–: Music for Sound-Joined Rooms
- 1985–: Mini-Sound Series

Dance Scores (all choreography Merce Cunningham)

- 1974: Everything in Air, tape
- 1975: Events 101,102, tape
- 1975: Labyrinth Gives Way to Skin, tape
- 1976: Remainder, tape

Works for Tape (unless otherwise noted)

- 1975: Presence
- 1976: Music for Sweet Bird of Youth
- 1976: Lecture on the Weather (collaboration with John Cage)
- 1979: Empty Words / Close Up (collaboration with John Cage)
- 1991: Petra, two pianos

Events:

- 2016: Labyrinth Gives Way to Skin: Maryanne Amacher Listening Session
- 2016: Naut Humon & Edwin van der Heide: Plaything - Maryanne Amacher (Performance and Lecture at CynetArt)
