= Berry Dress =

1994 mixed media sculpture by Alice Maher

Coordinates: 53.3400°N 6.2997°W

- Artist: Alice Maher
- Year: 1994
- Type: sculpture
- Medium: mixed media
- Dimensions: 25 cm × 32 cm × 24 cm (9.8 in × 13 in × 9.4 in)
- Location: The Irish Museum of Modern Art; Dublin

The Berry Dress is a 1994 mixed media sculpture by Alice Maher.

== Description ==
The sculpture has dimensions 25 x 32 x 24 centimeters. It is in the collection of the Irish Museum of Modern Art, Dublin.

== Analysis ==
It represents a young girl's dress painted dark pink, that stands alone on a shelf. It is self-supported due to a wax treatment. The bottom part of the dress just under the yoke is decorated with rose hips, or berries. The dress was created in 1994 and the berries were originally round and a blood red color but have dried into a shriveled brown crust. The dress presents challenges for presentation and preservation, while being itself a commentary on the definition of the term "dress".

Alice Maher's work often incorporates natural materials and this dress can be seen as a pendant of a similar girl's dress presented on a shelf covered in mummified honeybees.

When asked about her art, Maher said "...the meaning is changing all the time. This depends on the context, who's looking at it, and how much time has passed. For example with a dress, it meant something completely different perhaps in the 80s than now."

== See also ==
- List of individual dresses
