= Catherine Christer Hennix =

Swedish and American composer (1948–2023)

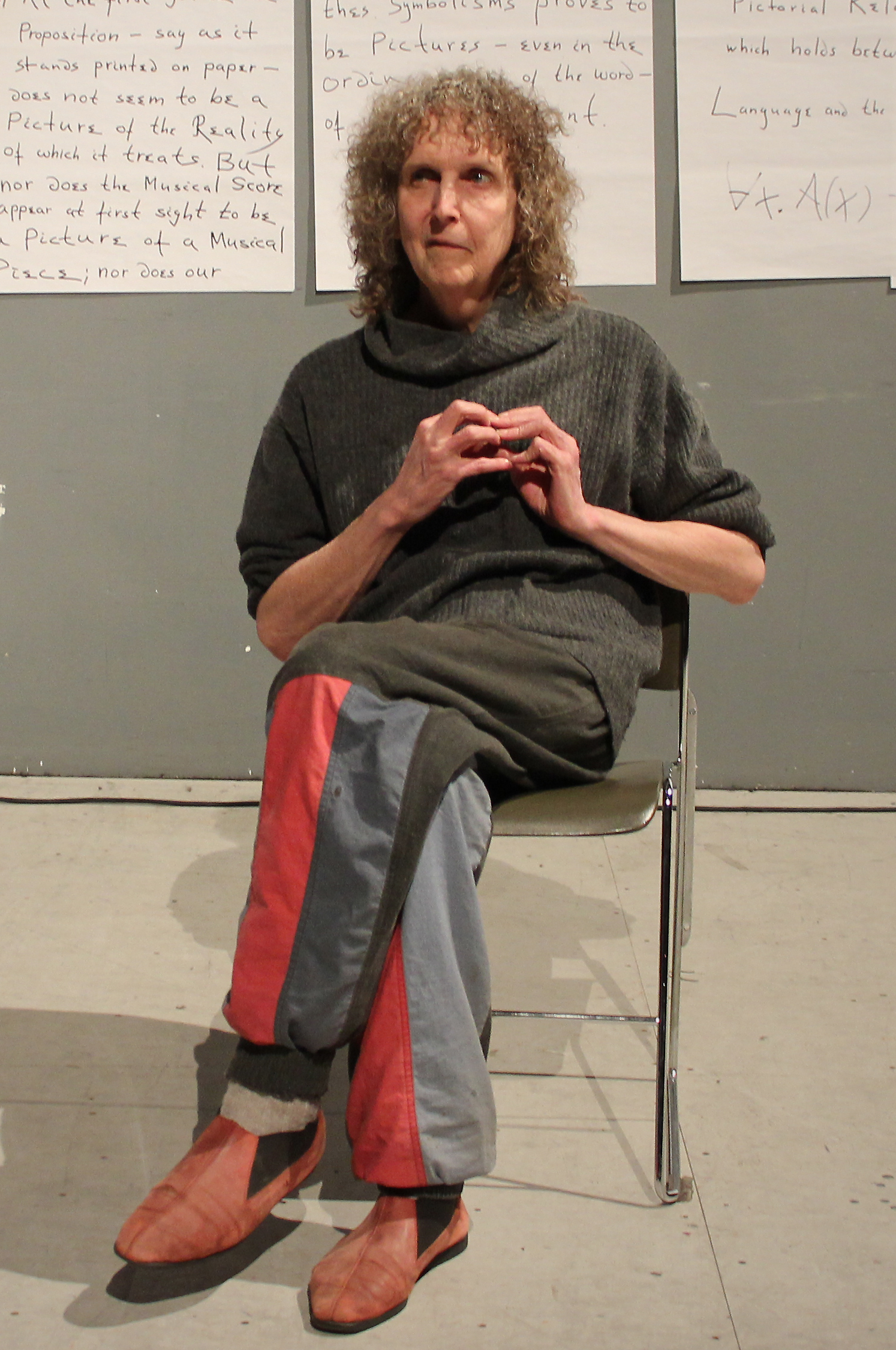
- Hennix at Sonic Acts lecture in 2012
- Born: 25 January 1948; Stockholm, Sweden
- Died: 19 November 2023 (aged 75); Istanbul, Turkey
- Education: Stockholm University
- Occupations: Mathematician, musician, philosopher, visual artist, poet
- Movement: Ultraintuitionism, minimalism
- Musical career
- Instruments: Voice, keyboards, tambura, oboe, computer, drums
- Years active: Late 1960s – 2023
- Labels: Locust, Blank Forms, Empty, Die Schachtel, Important

Catherine Christer Hennix (also known as C.C. Hennix; 25 January 1948 – 19 November 2023) was a Swedish musician, poet, philosopher, mathematician and visual artist. As a musician, she worked with figures such as Pandit Pran Nath, La Monte Young, and Henry Flynt. Several of her archival recordings have been released in the 21st century, most prominently The Electric Harpsichord (2010). Hennix was affiliated with MIT's AI Lab in the late 1970s and was later employed as research professor of mathematics at SUNY New Paltz; she also worked with mathematician Alexander Esenin-Volpin.

== Biography ==
Catherine Christer Hennix was born on January 25, 1948, in Stockholm, Sweden. She grew up in a musical environment; her mother, Margit Sundin-Hennix, was a jazz composer who frequently invited well-known American jazz musicians such as Idrees Sulieman and Eric Dolphy around the house, and she saw John Coltrane and others perform. Hennix took up drums at the age of 5 and performed with her brother. Later, Hennix studied with Stockhausen and was among the pioneers in Sweden experimenting with main-frame computer generated composite sound wave forms in the late 1960s. She studied bio-chemistry and then linguistics at Stockholm University before settling on mathematical logic and philosophy.

In 1968, she connected with Fluxus artists Dick Higgins and Allison Knowles in New York, and began collaborative relationships with figures such as La Monte Young and Henry Flynt. She pursued studies with raga master Pandit Pran Nath and led the just intonation live-electronic ensembles Hilbert Hotel and The Deontic Miracle. At the urging of Nath, she also pursued an academic, teaching logic at MIT's AI Lab in the 1970s and later, mathematics at SUNY New Paltz. She studied under Alexander Esenin-Volpin, later becoming his research partner. They co-authored a paper which earned her the Centenary Prize Fellow Award from the Clay Mathematics Institute in 2000. In 1976, Hennix curated Brouwer's Lattice,10-day festival featuring minimalist compositions, at Moderna Museet in Stockholm. Hennix transitioned in the late 1980s. In the 1990s, she relocated to Amsterdam to study psychoanalysis with students of Jacques Lacan. Lacan's seminars inspired some of Hennix's later performances and installations, including an unfinished collaboration with her long-time partner, photographer Lena Tuzzolino, which was exhibited at Stedelijk Museum Amsterdam.

Hennix's interest in drone music is crossed with her interests in jazz, Arabic music, Sufi Islamic art, and blues elements. In the 1970s and 1980s, she played with musicians such as Arthur Russell and Arthur Rhames. She also performed in Flynt's group Dharma Warriors. Archival recordings such as The Electric Harpsichord (2010) and Selected Early Keyboard Works (2018) saw release in the 21st century. In recent years, she has performed with her group the Chora(s)san Time-Court Mirage. Hennix also wrote poetry and Japanese Noh dramas, many of which were published in the two-volume collection Poësy Matters and Other Matters in 2019.

=== Death ===
Hennix died at her home in Istanbul, Turkey, on 19 November 2023, at the age of 75. She was introduced to Sufism by Nath, which influenced her decision to convert to Islam in her later years. She moved to Istanbul in 2019, in part to hear the regular call to prayer.

== Bibliography ==
- "Notes on Toposes and Adjoints" (1976)
- "Notes on Intuitionisitc Modal Music" (1976)
- "Intensional Logics for Intransitive Experiences" (1979)
- "Parmenides on Intensional Logics" (1979)
- "Poetry as Philosophy, Poetry as Notation" (1985)
- "Philosophy of Concept Art" [co-authored with Flynt] (1989)
- "Hors-texte '68–'88; Finis Universatum: Philosophy as Art/ Philosophy as Notation, II" (1989)
- "Grammatica tua sit tibi in periditionem" (1992)
- "Seminarium över La Sinthome och Mathémkonstent genealogik" (1994)
- "Beware of the Gödel-Wette Paradox" – [co-authored with Esenin-Volpin] (2001)
- Poësy Matters and Other Matters (2019)

== List of works ==
- "The Hashigakari Chord" (1973–) [infinitary composite sound wave]
- "Central Palace Music" (1976–) [two amplified renaissance oboes, amplified sheng, sine waves]
- "Netori / Hashigakari" (1976–) [amplified renaissance oboe, amplified sheng, sine waves]
- "Waves of the Blue Sea" (1976–) [two amplified renaissance oboes, sine waves]
- "The Electric Harpsichord" (1976–) [well-tuned Yamaha keyboard. sine waves]
- "Five Times Repeated Music" (1976–) [two amplified renaissance oboes, sine waves]
- "Soliton(e) Star" (2003–) [infinitary composite sound wave]
- "Blues Dhkir al-Salam (Blues al Maqam)" (2011–)
- "Rag Infinity/Rag Cosmosis" (2013–) (well-tuned Yamaha keyboard, computer, sine waves]
- "Blues Alif Lam Mim" (2015–)
- "For Brass and Computer" (2017) [trumpet, French horn, trombone, microtonal tuba and computer]

== Discography ==
Releases credited to Hennix and her various groups.

=== Solo recordings ===
- "Still Life, Q" (1969, Sveriges Radio)
- The Electric Harpsichord (2010, Die Schachtel)
- Live at Krems (2018, Important)
- Selected Early Keyboard Works (2018, Blank Forms)
- Unbegrenzt (2020, Blank Forms)
- Solo for Tamburium (2023, Blank Forms)

=== The Deontic Miracle ===
- Central Palace Music from 100 Model Subjects For Hegikan Roku (2016, Important)
- Selections from 100 Models of Hegikan Roku (2019, Blank Forms)

=== Chora(s)san Time-Court Mirage ===
- Live at the Grimm Museum, Volume One (2012, Important)
- Live at Issue Project Room (2016, Important)

=== Born of Six ===
- Svapiti (2013, Important)

=== Work with Henry Flynt ===
- You Are My Everlovin / Celestial Power (1986, Hundertmark) – tambura
- Dharma Warriors (2008, Locust) – Henry Flynt / C.C. Hennix
- C Tune (2002, Locust) – tambura
- Purified by the Fire (2005, Locust) – tambura
- Glissando No. 1 (2011) – piano
