= Henning Christiansen =

Danish composer (1932–2008)

Henning Christiansen (28 May 1932 in Copenhagen – 10 December 2008) was a Danish composer and an active member of the Fluxus-movement. He worked with artists such as Joseph Beuys, Nam June Paik, Bazon Brock and Wolf Vostell as well as with his wife Ursula Reuter Christiansen. Other collaborators include Bjørn Nørgaard, Carlo Quartucci, Carla Tato, Ernst Kretzer, Ben Patterson, David Moss, Ute Wassermann, Andreas Oldörp, Christophe Charles, Bernd Jasper, Henrik Kiel, Vilem Wagner, Vladimir Tarasov, Niko Tenten, and many others.

His overall goal was to work collaboratively and to trespass conventional boundaries. He resented the idea of an isolated artistic genius and his entire production can be seen as a subsequent and vibrant example of praxis in a constant flux. He believed in the need to trespass conventional boundaries between artistic disciplines. This is visible from his engagement in Fluxus, over numerous collaborative performances to his position as a professor at the Art Academy in Hamburg (Hochschule für Bildende Künste – HfBK).

Christiansen lived almost 40 years on the Danish Island Møn. He presented a retrospective exhibition in Copenhagen and participated in the music festival Wundergrund shortly before his death.

The word "minimal" was perhaps first used in relation to music in 1968 by Michael Nyman, who "deduced a recipe for the successful 'minimal-music' happening from the entertainment presented by Charlotte Moorman and Nam June Paik at the ICA", which included a performance of Springen by Henning Christiansen and a number of unidentified performance-art pieces.

== Works (selected) ==
- Sonate Op. 13 (1962)
- Perspective Constructions (1965)
- Beckett-sange Op. 14 (1963)
- Den arkadiske op.32 (1966)
- fluxorum organum Op.39 (1967)
- Hulemåned Op. 143 (1981)
- Betrayal Op. 144 (1981)
- Sulemåned Op. 145 (1981)
- Kong Frost Op. 147 (1982)
- Maskemåned Op. 148 (1982)
- Kameliadamens kærlighed og død Op. 152 (1983)
- Symphony Natura Op.170 (1985)
- Abschiedssymphonie Op.177 (1988)
- Kreuzmusik (1989)
- Verena Vogelzymphon (1991)
- Dust Out of Brain (1995)
