= Art Murphy =

American jazz musician

Arthur "Art" Bixler Murphy (January 25, 1942 – November 19, 2006) was a classical and jazz musician, pianist and composer. He was born in Princeton, New Jersey. He grew up in Oberlin, OH, where his father was a member of the Oberlin College faculty.

Murphy was a founding member of the Philip Glass and Steve Reich Ensembles, and played a key role in the development of minimalist music.

== Training ==
He received a master's degree in Composition in 1966 from the Juilliard School of Music in New York City, NY, where he studied with composer Luciano Berio and received several BMI Foundation composition prizes. Murphy’s classmates at Juilliard included composers Steve Reich and Philip Glass.

== Musical career ==
=== Steve Reich Ensemble ===
Reich's ensemble was formed in 1966. The original three members were Reich, Art Murphy and Jon Gibson. Reich sought out Murphy’s knowledge of serial composition and changing time signatures to help give life to the new musical concepts they developed.

Reich explained how he worked with Murphy on the piece Piano Phase (1967):

"...the direct result of my work in 1965-66 on two identical audio loops played simultaneously on two separate tape recorders... Over the course of several months, Art Murphy and I – by first working at home playing against tape recordings of our own performance, and then playing on two pianos – found that, while we lacked the perfection of the machine, we could give a good approximation of it and we got to like this totally new and particularly satisfying way of playing, which was completely worked out in advance and eliminated the necessity of actually reading a score. The result was that we became totally absorbed in listening while we were playing the piece."

=== Jazz career ===
Though Murphy was classically trained and played a key role in minimalist composition and performance, his true musical love was jazz.

While attending Juilliard, Murphy worked with the composer and arranger Hall Overton on arrangements for a Thelonious Monk big band concert in New York in 1963.

In the early 1960s, Murphy also met pianist Bill Evans and became a close friend and confidant until Evans' death in 1980. Murphy’s second daughter, born in 1964, was named Miriam Evan, after Evans. Murphy became the chief transcriptionist for Evans’ solos, playing Evans’ records at 16 rpm to make sure he got every note. Many of these transcriptions were published and performed by other artists such as classical pianist Jean-Yves Thibaudet, who recorded a 1996 album entitled Conversations with Bill Evans.

=== Later years ===
In the 1970s, Murphy began work as an actuary and as a systems analyst, working for various employers and he occasionally performed as a jazz pianist at various venues in the New York, New Jersey and Philadelphia areas.

Murphy retired from full-time employment after learning of his cancer diagnosis in late 2004. He resumed work as a jazz pianist. For a time, Murphy played jazz piano weekly at the Plumsteadville Inn, in Bucks County, Pennsylvania. He also performed at other Bucks County venues such as Maggie's Place in Doylestown and La Cena in Bensalem. Murphy’s last musical performance was on November 4, 2006 at La Cena. Murphy died at his Flemington, New Jersey home on November 19, 2006.

== Discography ==
- Jean-Yves Thibaudet: Conversations with Bill Evans (Decca, 1997) with Art Murphy, transcriptionist for Evans' solos
- Philip Glass: Music with Changing Parts (Nonesuch, 1971) with Art Murphy, electric piano
- Philip Glass: Two Pages/Contrary Motion/Music in Fifths/Music in Similar Motion (Nonesuch, 1971) with Art Murphy, organ
- Steve Reich's Four Organs/Phase Patterns (New Tone, 1970), with Steve Reich, Philip Glass, Arthur Murphy, Steve Chambers, Jon Gibson
- Henry Flynt and the Insurrections: I Don’t Wanna (Locust Records, 1966) with Art Murphy, keyboards

== Live performances with Steve Reich ==
=== Piano Phase (1967) ===
- 2 pianos or 2 marimbas
- Art Murphy and Steve Reich/ Fairleigh Dickinson University, Rutherford, NJ/ January 1967

=== My Name Is (1967) ===
- 3 or more tape recorders, performers, audience
- Art Murphy and Steve Reich/ School of Visual Arts, New York/ November 1967

=== Four Log Drums (1969) ===
- unpublished
- phase shifting pulse gate, 4 log drums
- Jon Gibson, Philip Glass, Richard Landry, Art Murphy, Steve Reich/ Whitney Museum of American Art, New York/ May 27, 1969

=== Four Organs (January 1970) ===
- 4 electric organs and maracas
- Steve Chambers, Jon Gibson, Philip Glass, Art Murphy, Steve Reich/ Guggenheim Museum, New York/ May 1970

=== Phase Patterns (1970) ===
- 4 electric organs
- Steve Chambers, Jon Gibson, Art Murphy, Steve Reich/ Guggenheim Museum, New York/ May 1970

== Books ==
=== Pictured in ===
- Michael Nyman, Experimental Music: Cage and Beyond (Music in the Twentieth Century), p. 152
