= Ute Wassermann =

German vocalist, composer and sound artist

Ute Wassermann (born 1960) is a German vocalist, composer and sound artist.

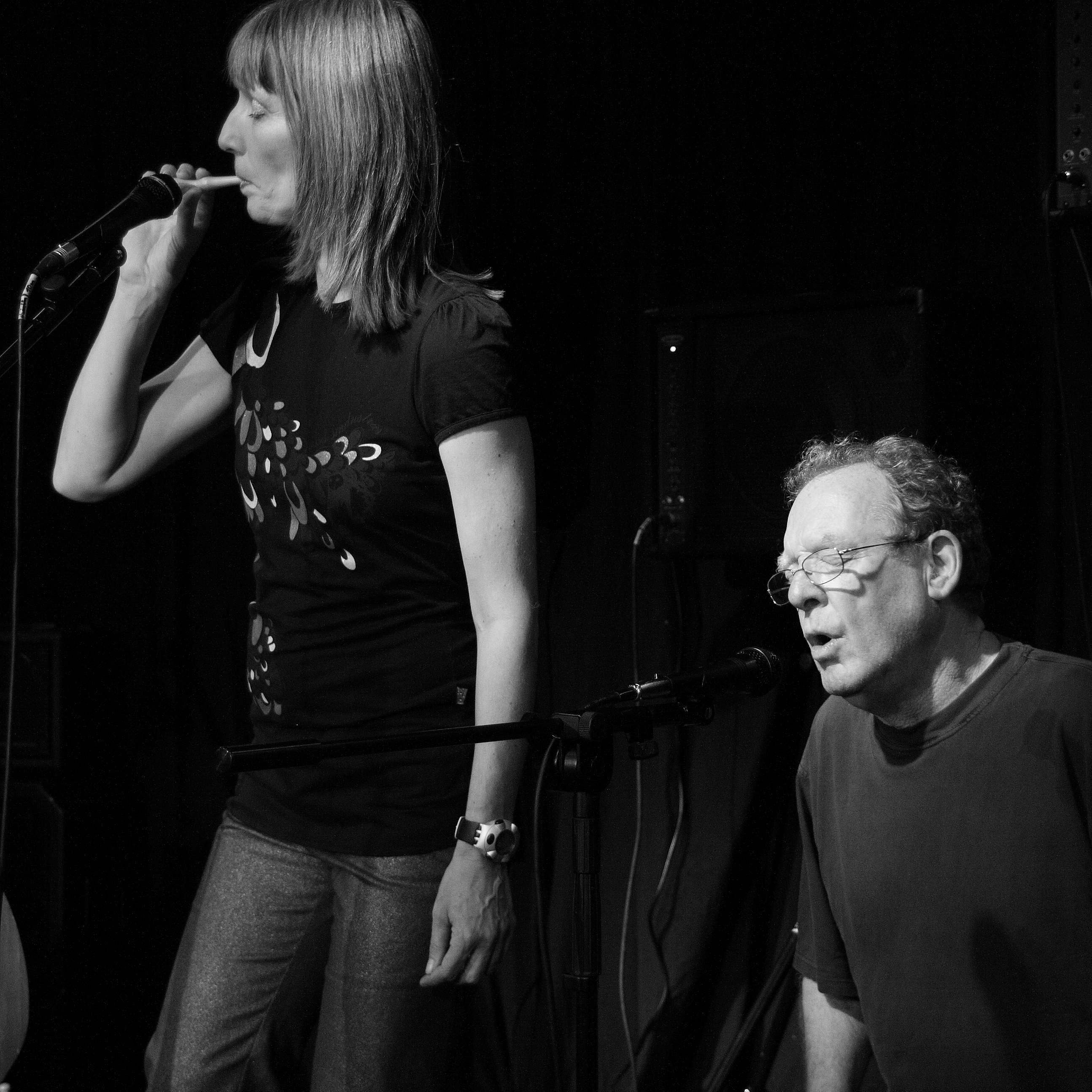
Ute Wassermann and Phil Minton performing with speak easy

== Biography ==
Ute Wassermann studied fine arts focusing on sound installations and performance at the University of Fine Arts of Hamburg. Among her teachers were Henning Christiansen and Allan Kaprow. She continued her studies in fine arts, music and singing at the University of California, San Diego. She was a fellow at Akademie Schloss Solitude in 1993–94 and at Civitella Ranieri in Italy in 2015.

== Work ==
Ute Wassermann has developed her own unique vocal techniques. She explores them in different forms such as voice performances, compositions, improvisations and installations. The human voice is extended in many different ways in her work and often plays with all kinds of other sound connotations. This also results in an extensive use of bird whistles, different kinds of resonating objects and prepared loudspeakers.

She is one of the founding members of the artists collective Les Femmes Savantes Other members of this Composer-Performer-Ensemble are Sabine Ercklentz, Andrea Neumann and Ana Maria Rodriguez. She also performs with Richard Scott and Emilio Gordoa in parak.eets and with her quartet speak easy (with Phil Minton, Thomas Lehn and Martin Blume)She also often plays as an Improvisationsduo with, for example, Aleksander Kolkowski, Rhodrie Davies, Joke Lanz, Birgit Ulher, Els Vandeweyer, Charlotte Hug, Richard Barrett und John Russel.

Ute Wassermann also performs compositions by others. She has interpreted works by Chaya Czernowin, Henning Christiansen, Hans Joachim Hespos, Salvatore Sciarrino, Luciano Berio, Simon Steen-Andersen, Matthias Kaul, Cathy van Eck, und Richard Barrett.

== Compositions ==
- Main gauche – souffle – main droite. Installation/Performance for flute, contact microphones and two loudspeakers (1986)
- Windy Gong for voice, microphone, prepared loudspeaker and gong (1995)
- fausse voix for voice, electrified gong and bird whistles (2006)
- Soledades: voice performance with bird whistles in Plänterwald in Berlin (2014)
- InPutOut for microphones, loudspeakers and metal plates (2015)
- Pneuma for voice and speaking machine (2016)
- Strange Songs for voice and bird whistles (2016)

== Discography ==
- Ute Wassermann, Birgit Ulher Kunststoff (Creative Sources 2004)
- Ute Wassermann Birdtalking (Nur/Nicht/Nur 2007)
- Ute Wassermann, Richard Barrett Pollen (Creative Sources 2007)
- Alex Kolkowski, Ute Wassermann Squall Line (psi 2011)
- Ute Wassermann Ute Wassermann – A Retrospective Tribute | 1984–2012 (Audition Records 2011)
- Ute Wassermann, Birgit Ulher Radio Tweet (Creative Sources 2015)

== Literature ==
- Reimar Reetz: Experimente mit inneren und äußeren Räumen. Die Stimmperformerin Ute Wassermann positionen No. 70, (2007).
- Julian Cowley: Ute Wassermann – The German Improv vocalist pushes her body to extreme limits to generate multiphonic ululations. The Wire. No. 284, (2007).
- Cathy van Eck: Between Air and Electricity. Microphones and Loudspeakers as Musical Instruments. Bloomsbury Academic, New York 2017. ISBN 978-1-5013-2760-5 (Windy Gong by Ute Wassermann: Singing through the gong 153–155).
