= Lowave =

Exhibition designers in Paris and Singapore

Lowave is a curatorial platform based in Paris and Singapore.

== History ==
Founded in 2002 by Mark Horchler and Silke Schmickl, as a publishing house in the field of experimental cinema and video art. Lowave is directed since 2007 by Silke Schmickl and evolved into a platform for curatorial research principally around contemporary art and moving images.

Lowave's main activities revolve around the conception and production of exhibitions, as was the case for Singapour mon amour (Point Éphémère, Cinémathèque française, musée du Quai Branly, Centre Pompidou, Eglise Saint-Merry), Body Politics (Beirut Art Fair, 2014), Theo.do.lites (ICA Singapour, 2013), Rising Images (Centre Pompidou Paris, 2012), Human Frames (KIT Düsseldorf, 2011), Reframing Reality (Museet for Samtidskunst Roskilde, 2010) ou Middle East Video Channel (Guangzhou Triennial, 2008) and the programmes and performances in multiple international institutions such as the Collège des Bernardins in Paris, The Substation in Singapore, the Cineteca in Madrid our the Pera Museum in Istanbul.

The singularity of Lowave's work lies in its international scope, with a strong interest in Asia, the Middle East and Africa, the valuation of emerging artists and the implementation of interdisciplinary and intercultural crossings. Since its inception, Lowave has collaborated with institutions such as the Centre Georges Pompidou, La Cinémathèque Française, The British Film Institute, Centre Nationale de la Cinématographie and UNESCO.

Lowave's DVD catalogue features video artists, experimental filmmakers, visual artists, photographers, musicians and performance artists. With monographies and documentaries on art or video portraits of artists, the catalogue also includes a significant amount of compilations that focuses on the discovery of emerging scenes (Résistance[s]) 1-3, In/Flux 1-3, Conditioned, Re:Frame) and thematics (Different Cinema co-produced with the Collectif Jeune Cinéma or Hors Pistes with Centre Georges Pompidou)

== Main Projects ==
=== Singapour mon amour ===
Singapour mon amour is a Singaporean art showcase in Paris from 4 June to 12 July 2015 featuring 42 intellectuals and artists from Singapore and France.

=== Human Frames ===
The exhibition Human Frames: ten psychological states - 77 video artists and filmmakers from Asia and Europe is dedicated to the human being, the condition humaine and the various states of mind that accompany man on his journey through life. In the form of ten thematically compiled film programmes with works by contemporary artists and filmmakers from Europe and Asia that concentrate upon themes such as happiness, desire, madness, fanaticism, fear, anger, isolation, melancholy, the exhibition will re-examine and illuminate human existence at the start of the twenty-first century, including the eastern concepts mono no aware (‘the pathos of things’) and impermanence. Human Frames is curated by Silke Schmickl, Masayo Kajimura, Victric Thng, François Michaud and Stéphane Gérard.

Human Frames had its exhibition premiere at the Kunst-Im-Tunnel, Düsseldorf from 11/6 to 24/7/11, featuring 77 film and video art works from the collection. The opening night, participated by the curators and artists, included an exclusive showpiece by live musicians Black To Comm performing improvisational musical accompaniment to Earth (a film by Ho Tzu Nyen). The 10 programmes were beautifully installed in the underground museum, both quiet and grand, making use of large projector screens, multiple television sets and blank walls as canvasses. Each programme had its own unique spatial set up in a minimally constructed space where one could wander and encounter the works without limitations.

From 2011 until 2012, the project has been presented in various exhibition venues, cultural institutions and book stores in Asia and Europe.
