= Áine O'Dwyer =

- Born: Ireland
- Genres: Ambient, Free Folk, Drone, Avant-Folk
- Occupation: Musician
- Instrument(s): Harp, piano, Organ
- Website: https://aineodwyer.bandcamp.com

Áine O'Dwyer is an Irish experimental musician, known for her live performances and recordings, which explore the aesthetics of sound and its relationship to environment, time, audience, and structure. Originally from Pallasgreen, County Limerick, she studied at the Limerick School of Art and Design (graduating 2006) and in London at the Slade School of Fine Art (graduating 2011). She is currently based in London.

As a child, O'Dwyer played the piano, tin whistle, flute, fiddle and harp. She now performs primarily on harp and church organ.

== Live performances ==
Published accounts of O'Dwyer's live appearances include The Music of the Future by Robert Barry, who describes O'Dwyer lying on the floor under a baize cloth, plucking the strings of a harp with her feet, during a performance at the Supernormal Festival in Reading.

O'Dwyer's appearance in November 2015 at London's Cafe Oto, in which she dressed as an 18th century scullery maid, backlit with a fan flailing her hair, and played the accordion, was described by The Quietus reviewer Matthew Foster, as "a terrifying sight for the average wuss", while Chal Ravens of Fact Mag described a performance by O'Dwyer as "like an invisible banshee haunting the pipes of the church’s organ, O'Dwyer pummels us with gothic drama from her concealed lair above the altar" and experimental artist Graham Dunning described her live sets as "always refreshing, often very melancholy but often with deliberately jarring sections or silly interludes".

O'Dwyer has also collaborated with artist Alice Maher on a live show, Visitant, which combined dance, music and visual art, performed at the Project Arts Centre in 2014 and based performances on her own drawings of mythical creatures.

== Albums ==
Her albums include Gallarais (2017), Beast Diaries (2017), Music For Church Cleaners (2012), Locusts (2016) and Gegenschein (2016).

Music For Church Cleaners is an album of pipe organ improvisations, utilising graphic scores, recorded at St Mark’s Church in Islington, while church cleaners continued to go about their duties. The sounds of the cleaners' activities were included on the recordings. This album was released on cassette and later expanded into a full-length album as Music For Church Cleaners Vol I & II (2015).

Her album Locusts is No 6 on Thump's The 25 Best Experimental Albums of 2016 list.

== Discography ==
Albums
Title	Release info	Year	F	Notes
Music For Church Cleaners	Fort Evil Fruit FEF4	2012	Cass	
Anything Bright Or Startling?	Second Language SL022	2013	Cass	
Safely Adrift	Self-released	2014	FLAC, MP3	
Meditations On A World Ending 21.12.12.	Self-released	2014	CD-R	Ltd ed.
Music For Church Cleaners Vol. I And II	MIE Music MIE 028	2015	2-LP	avail in other formats
Locusts	Fort Evil Fruit FEF50	2016	Cass	Ltd ed.
Gegenschein	Fort Evil Fruit FEF49	2016	Cass	
Gallarais	MIE Music MIE 045	2017	LP with Digital D/L	
Daedalus Airs	Self-released	2020	FLAC, MP3	
