= Seven Stars (EP) =

EP by Fennesz
- Released: 5 July 2011
- Studio: Studio B, Amannstudios, Vienna; Amannstudios
- Length: 18:05
- Label: Touch

Fennesz chronology
Black Sea (2008)	Seven Stars (2011)	Bécs (2014)

Seven Stars is an EP by Austrian musician Christian Fennesz under the mononym Fennesz. It was released on 5 July 2011 through Touch.

== Background ==
Fennesz is an Austrian musician based in Vienna. Seven Stars is his first solo release since Black Sea (2008). The EP consists of four tracks: "Liminal", "July", "Shift", and "Seven Stars". The EP's title track features Steven Hess on drums. Fennesz stated, "I wanted to make a record that has a certain lightness about it and at the same time explore new territory using drums on one track." The EP was released on 5 July 2011 through Touch.

== Critical reception ==
Professional ratings
Review scores
Source	Rating
AllMusic	3/5 stars
Fact	3.5/5
Pitchfork	7.1/10

Jess Harvell of Pitchfork stated, "Seven Stars is a welcome if not surprising dose of what Fennesz has been doing well for a decade now, playing on the thin edge between familiar pleasures and the truly out-there." Brock Thiessen of Exclaim! commented that "It's a calming listen, for sure, highlighted best by the EP's cinematic title track, which comes complete with snail-paced live drum work and slowly strung six-strings." Jonny Coleman of Fact wrote, "Like most of Fennesz's work, Seven Stars would be some romantic shit to die to, equal parts bombast and benevolence."

== Track listing ==
Seven Stars track listing
No.	Title	Length
1.	"Liminal"	3:07
2.	"July"	5:05
3.	"Shift"	6:47
4.	"Seven Stars"	3:01
Total length:		18:05

Bandcamp edition bonus track
No.	Title	Length
5.	"Reshift"	7:08
Total length:		25:13

== Personnel ==
Credits adapted from liner notes.

- Fennesz – acoustic guitar, electric guitar, bass guitar, synthesizer, computer
- Steven Hess – drums (on "Seven Stars")
- Christoph Amann – recording
- Denis Blackham – mastering
- Jon Wozencroft – photography

== Charts ==
Chart performance for Seven Stars
Chart (2011)	Peak position
UK Physical Singles (OCC)	58
