= Shebang (album) =

Studio album by Oren Ambarchi
- Released: 30 September 2022
- Studio: Choose (Berlin); Challis (Sydney); Stately Wayne Manor (London); Summa (Stockholm); The Crystal Ball (Berlin); Steamroom (Japan); Good Mixture (Berlin)
- Genre: Experimental
- Length: 35:00
- Label: Drag City

Oren Ambarchi chronology
Simian Angel (2019)	Shebang (2022)

Shebang is a solo studio album by Australian musician Oren Ambarchi. It was released on 30 September 2022, through Drag City. It received universal acclaim from critics.

== Background ==
The inspiration for Shebang came when Oren Ambarchi saw Julia Reidy playing a concert on 12-string guitar. The album contains performances by Ambarchi (on guitar), Joe Talia (on drums), Sam Dunscombe (on bass clarinet), B. J. Cole (on pedal steel guitar), Johan Berthling (on double bass), Chris Abrahams (on piano), Jim O'Rourke (on synthesizer), and Reidy (on 12-string guitar). It is said to be an extension of past "long-form rhythmic workouts" found on Ambarchi's albums Quixotism (2014) and Hubris (2016). The album was released on 30 September 2022, through Drag City.

== Critical reception ==
Professional ratings
Aggregate scores
Source	Rating
Metacritic	82/100
Review scores
Source	Rating
AllMusic	4/5 stars
Beats Per Minute	79%
Mojo	4/5 stars
Pitchfork	8.1/10
Spectrum Culture	70%
Uncut	7/10

According to the review aggregator Metacritic, Shebang received "universal acclaim" based on a weighted average score of 82 out of 100 from 6 critic scores.

Vanessa Ague of The Quietus commented that "There's something enticing about the ways Shebang offers each artist their own space yet still maintains cohesiveness, finding the connections between each line to form a quilt made of each artist's individuality." Paul Simpson of AllMusic stated, "As dense as the mix gets, it never suffocates, and all of the instruments are allowed to breathe easily." He called the album "an inventive, vibrant work that constantly surprises and uplifts."

Lucas Martins of Beats Per Minute wrote, "For an outsider, it is best approached without expectations, as Ambarchi has no intention to conform to them." He added, "Long-time followers of his work, however, will find the label of 'workout' very appropriate, as he flexes the creative muscles which have allowed him to create so many long-winded symphonies in the past." Philip Sherburne of Pitchfork called the album "Ambarchi's most ambitious and absorbing piece to date." He commented that "Even when Ambarchi's instrument is hard to pick out, his vision is unmistakable."

=== Accolades ===
Year-end lists for Shebang
Publication	List	Rank	Ref.
Mojo	The 75 Best Albums of 2022	57	
Pitchfork	The 50 Best Albums of 2022	41	
The Quietus	Quietus Albums of the Year 2022	10	
The Wire	Releases of the Year (2022 Rewind)	4	

== Track listing ==
Shebang track listing
No.	Title	Length
1.	"I"	8:00
2.	"II"	10:34
3.	"III"	6:16
4.	"IV"	10:10
Total length:		35:00

== Personnel ==
Credits adapted from liner notes.

- Oren Ambarchi – guitar, etc., editing, mixing
- Joe Talia – drums, additional recording, mixing, mastering
- Sam Dunscombe – bass clarinet (1, 2), additional recording
- B. J. Cole – pedal steel guitar (2, 4), additional recording
- Johan Berthling – double bass (3), additional recording
- Chris Abrahams – piano (3, 4), additional recording
- Jim O'Rourke – synthesizer (3, 4), additional recording
- Julia Reidy – 12-string guitar (3, 4)
- Joerg Hiller – editing, recording
- Konrad Sprenger – executive production
- Dick Wolf – executive production
- Stephen O'Malley – design
- April Pethybridge – front cover cake photography
- Traianos Pakioufakis – feet photography
- Glenn Han – party photography
