= Fennesz =

Austrian electronic musician and guitarist (born 1962)

- Fennesz performing in Bethesda, Maryland in 2010

Background information
- Born: Christian Fennesz; 25 December 1962 (age 63); Vienna, Austria
- Origin: Neusiedl am See, Austria
- Genres: Electronica; ambient; glitch; noise
- Occupations: Record producer; guitarist
- Instruments: Guitar; laptop; Max/MSP
- Years active: 1995–present
- Labels: Editions Mego; Mego; Table of the Elements; Touch
- Formerly of: Fenn O'Berg
- Website: www.fennesz.com

Christian Fennesz (born 25 December 1962) is an Austrian producer and guitarist active in electronic music since the 1990s, often credited mononymously as Fennesz. His work utilizes guitar and laptop computers to blend melody with treated samples and glitch production. He lives and works in Vienna, and currently records on the UK label Touch.

Fennesz first received widespread recognition for his 2001 album Endless Summer, released on the Austrian label Mego. He has collaborated with a number of artists, including Ryuichi Sakamoto, Jim O'Rourke, Ulver, David Sylvian, and King Midas Sound.

== Biography ==
Fennesz was born and raised in Austria and studied music formally in art school. He started playing guitar around the age of 8 or 9. He initially performed as a member of the Austrian experimental rock band Maische before signing to electronic music label Mego as a solo artist. The influence of techno led him to begin composing with a laptop. In 1995, he released his first EP Instrument, which explored electro-acoustic and ambient stylings.

In 1997, Fennesz released his debut full-length album Hotel Paral.lel, which saw him delve more explicitly into laptop production and early glitch aesthetics. He followed with the 1998 single Plays, which contained near-unrecognizable covers of the Rolling Stones' "Paint It Black" and the Beach Boys' "Don't Talk (Put Your Head on My Shoulder)". In the following years, he collaborated with a variety of artists, including Peter "Pita" Rehberg and Jim O'Rourke as part of Fenn O'Berg.

In 2001, Fennesz released his third studio album Endless Summer to widespread critical praise and recognition. He collaborated with figures such as David Sylvian, Keith Rowe, eRikm, and Ryuichi Sakamoto in the following years, and released the albums Venice (2004) and Black Sea (2007) to further critical praise.

In 2009, Fennesz teamed up with Mark Linkous (Sparklehorse) to create In the Fishtank 15. The following year, Fennesz released Szampler, a cassette containing his sample collection on the Tapeworm label. This release was later remixed by Stefan Goldmann and released as Goldmann vs. Fennesz: Remiksz. In 2011, he released the Seven Stars EP. In that year, he appeared on the live Ulver release The Norwegian National Opera, contributing guitar and effects to "Not Saved." In November 2013, Fennesz played the final holiday camp edition of the All Tomorrow's Parties festival in Camber Sands, England. In 2014, he released the studio album Bécs. In 2015, he collaborated with UK group King Midas Sound on the album Edition 1. He released a collaborative album with Jim O'Rourke, It's Hard for Me to Say I'm Sorry (2016). He then released Agora (2019) and Mosaic (2024).

== Recording techniques ==
Since the 1990s, Fennesz has worked with the programming software Max/MSP and the free patch Ppooll, which he runs in conjunction with the workstation Logic 9. In both studio and live settings, he routes his guitar through effects pedals (including a custom distortion box) and into his computer. There, it is processed and combined with Ppooll software plugins and tools such as samplers, synthesizers, effects, and MIDI controllers.

== Discography ==
=== Studio albums ===
- Hotel Paral.lel (Mego, 1997)
- Plus Forty Seven Degrees 56' 37" Minus Sixteen Degrees 51' 08" (Touch, 1999)
- Endless Summer (Mego, 2001)
- Venice (Touch, 2004)
- Black Sea (Touch, 2008)
- Bécs (Editions Mego, 2014)
- Agora (Touch, 2019)
- Mosaic (Touch, 2024)

=== Collaboration albums ===
- Afternoon Tea (with Oren Ambarchi, Pimmon, Peter Rehberg & Keith Rowe; Ritornell, 2000)
- Wrapped Islands (with Polwechsel; Erstwhile, 2002)
- GRM Experience (with Mika Vainio and Christian Zanési; Signature, 2004)
- Cloud (with Keith Rowe, Toshimaru Nakamura, and Oren Ambarchi; Erstwhile, 2005)
- Cendre (with Ryuichi Sakamoto; Touch, 2007)
- Til the Old World's Blown Up and a New One Is Created (with Martin Brandlmayr and Werner Dafeldecker; Mosz, 2008)
- In the Fishtank 15 (with Sparklehorse; Konkurrent, 2009)
- Out of Noise (with Ryuichi Sakamoto; Commmons, 2009)
- Knoxville (with David Daniell and Tony Buck; Thrill Jockey, 2010)
- Remiksz (with Stefan Goldmann; Tapeworm, 2010)
- Flumina (with Ryuichi Sakamoto; Commmons/Touch, 2011)
- Edition 1 (with King Midas Sound; Ninja Tune, 2015)
- AirEffect (with OZmotic; Folk Wisdom, 2015)
- It's Hard for Me to Say I'm Sorry (with Jim O'Rourke; Editions Mego, 2016)
- Senzatempo (with OZmotic; Touch, 2023)

=== Compilation albums ===
- Field Recordings: 1995–2002 (Touch, 2002)
- Szampler (Tapeworm, 2010)

=== Live recordings ===
- Live at Revolver, Melbourne (EP; Touch, 2000)
- Live at the LU (with Keith Rowe; Erstwhile, 2004)
- Sala Santa Cecilia (EP with Ryuichi Sakamoto; Touch, 2005)
- Live in Japan (CD; Headz/Touch, 2003) (LP; Autofact/Touch, 2005)
- Live @ The V. Sessions (streaming video recording; The V. Sessions, 2009)
- Mahler Remixed (vinyl; Touch, 2014)

=== Studio EPs ===
- Instrument (12" vinyl; Mego, 1995)
- Il Libro Mio (EP; Tanz Hotel, 1998)
- Plays (7" vinyl; Mego, 1998)
- Plays (CD EP; Moikai, 1999)
- Plays (10" vinyl; Editions Mego, 2006)
- Seven Stars (CD EP/10" vinyl; Touch, 2011)
- The Last Days of May (CD EP; Longform Editions, 2025)

=== Singles, tracks, guest collaborations, etc. ===
- "Erstlive 004" (with Peter Rehberg, Sachiko M, and Otomo Yoshihide; Erstwhile, 2005)
- "On a Desolate Shore a Shadow Passes By" (download only; Touch, 2007)
- "Transition" (Touch, 2008)
- "Saffron Revolution" (download only; Touch, 2008)
- "Future Back" and "Impassive Skies" (with Patrick Pulsinger, on Pulsinger's album Impassive Skies; Disko B, 2010)
- "Fearless" (contribution for the Benefit for the Recovery in Japan compilation; Thrill Jockey, 2011)

=== Remixes ===
- Extended Versions - "Friends (Fennesz "Jetlag" Remix)" (Maxi, Familienalbum, 1996)
- Mastalsky - "Stunt (Fennesz Remix)" (Stunt Remix EP, Klein Records, 1998)
- Christoph Fringeli & Pure - "Darkstar (Fennesz Remix)" (Darkstar Remixes, Sub/Version, 1998)
- Ekkehard Ehlers - "Unter" (remix for Betrieb, Mille Plateaux, 2000)
- Tone Rec - "Fennesz Mix" (Demo Pack Démoli, Sub Rosa, 2000)
- While - "Shear Mix By Fennesz" (Slip, Chocolate Industries, 2001)
- "IVEND 00" (based on material from Attention: Cats by Various Artists; rkk13cd, Reckankreuzungsklankewerkzeuge, 2001)
- Kankawa 122 - "Right Foot (Christian Fennesz Remix)" (Greatful Remixers, Pioneer, 2002)
- Stephan Mathieu & Ekkehard Ehlers - "Codeine (Fennesz Remix)" (Heroin + Remixes, Orthlorng Musork, 2003)
- Junior Boys - "Last Exit (Fennesz Remix)" ("Birthday / Last Exit" single, KIN, 2003)
- Ulver - "Only the Poor Have to Travel" (remix of "Tomorrow Never Knows" and "The Future Sound of Music"; 1993–2003: A Decade in the Machines; Jester Records, 2003)
- Isis - "Weight (Fennesz Remix)" (Oceanic Remixes Vol IV; Ipecac, 2004)
- Ryuichi Sakamoto - "20 mSec. (Fennesz Remix)" (Bricolages, KAB America, 2006)
- Foetus - "Pareidolia (Fennesz Remix)" (Vein, Ectopic Ents, 2007)
- Nine Inch Nails - "In This Twilight (Fennesz)" (Year Zero Remixed, Interscope, 2007)
- Soap&Skin - "X-Ray Heartland (Fennesz Remix)" (Untitled, [PIAS] Recordings, 2008)
- Oneohtrix Point Never - "Returnal (Fennesz Remix)" (Returnal maxi single, Editions Mego, 2010)
- Miracle - "The Visitor (Fennesz Remix)" (The Visitors EP, House Anxiety Records, 2011)
- Sōtaisei Riron - "QSMJAF-STSR/Fennesz" (remix of "Shikaku Kakumei"; Tadashii Sōtaisei Riron; Commmons/Mirai Records, 2011)
- Cédric Stevens - "Between The Battle And The Sheets (Fennesz Remix)" (The Syncopated Elevators Legacy, Discrepant, 2012)
- Apparat - "Candil De La Calle (Fennesz Remix)" ("Candil De La Calle" single, Mute, 2012)
- Vampillia - "Sea (Fennesz Remix)" (Dusty Nail, Virgin Babylon Records, 2015)
- Anna Zaradny - "New Feat Old (Christan Fennesz Mix)" (RE : EM, Bocian Records, 2015)
- Niagara - "Vanillacola (Fennesz Remix)" (Vanilla-cola Re-bottled, Monotreme Records, 2015)
- Jack Colwell - "Don't Cry Those Tears (Fennesz Remake)" (When The World Explodes EP, Picture Window, 2016)
- Michael Gordon & Mantra Percussion - "Timber Remixed: Fennesz" (Timber Remixed, Cantaloupe Music, 2016)
- Ryuichi Sakamoto - "Solari (Fennesz Remix)" (Async – Remodels, Commmons/Milan, 2017)
- Chra - "Abandoned House (Fennesz Remix)" (Ghost, Editions Mego, 2019)
- The Cinematic Orchestra - "A Caged Bird/Imitations Of Life (Fennesz Remix)" (To Believe (Remixes), Ninja Tune, 2020)
- Ulrich Troyer - "NOK 9 (Fennesz Remix)" (NOK 2020, 4bit Productions, 2020)
- Cleared - "Bonded (Fennesz Reimagining)" (The Key, Touch, 2020)
- Ryuichi Sakamoto - "Amore (Fennesz Remix)" (To the Moon and Back, Milan, 2022)
- Michael Vincent Waller - "Vibrafono Studio (Fennesz Remix)" (Moments Remixes, Play Loud!, 2024)
- Mariusz Szypura - "Berceuse Op. 57 (Fennesz Rework)" (Chopin Residue, Black Element Label, 2025)

=== Soundtracks ===
- Beyond the Ocean (USA, 1999)
- Gelbe Kirschen (directed by Leopold Lummerstorfer; Austria, 2000)
- Blue Moon (written and directed by Andrea Maria Dusl; Austria, 2002)
- Platform#09 Chicago (directed by Cedrick Eymenier; France, 2005)
- Film ist. a girl & a gun (directed by Gustav Deutsch, with Lucía Pulido, Martin Siewert, Burkhard Stangl; Austria, 2009) (7" vinyl; Interstellar Records, Austria, 2009)
- AUN: The Beginning and the End of All Things (Ash International, 2012)

=== With Fenn O'Berg ===
- The Magic Sound of Fenn O'Berg (Mego, 1999)
- The Return of Fenn O'Berg (Mego, 2002)
- Magic & Return (double CD reissue; Editions Mego, 2009)
- In Stereo (Editions Mego, 2010)

=== With Food ===
- Quiet Inlet (ECM, 2010)
- Mercurial Balm (ECM, 2012)
- This Is Not a Miracle (ECM, 2015)

=== With Orchester 33 1/3 ===
- Orchester 33 1/3 (Plag Dich Nicht, 1997)
- Maschine Brennt (Plag Dich Nicht, 2000)

== See also ==
- List of ambient music artists
- List of Austrians in music
