= Venice (Fennesz album) =

Studio album by Fennesz
- Released: 23 March 2004
- Recorded: July 2003; January–February 2004
- Studio: Venice; Amann Studios, Vienna
- Length: 49:06
- Label: Touch

Fennesz chronology
Endless Summer (2001)	Venice (2004)	Black Sea (2008)

Venice is a studio album by Austrian electronic music producer and guitarist Fennesz, released on 23 March 2004 on Touch. A 10th anniversary edition was released in 2014, adding one track ("The Future Will Be Different") to the beginning and another track ("Tree") to the end of the track listing.

== Critical reception ==
Professional ratings
Aggregate scores
Source	Rating
Metacritic	82/100
Review scores
Source	Rating
AllMusic	4.5/5 stars
Cokemachineglow	89%
Mojo	3.5/5 stars
Pitchfork	8.6/10
Stylus	B+
Sputnikmusic	4.5/5
Tiny Mix Tapes	4/5 stars
Tom Hull	B
Uncut	4/5 stars

At Metacritic, which assigns a weighted average score out of 100 to reviews from mainstream critics, Venice received an average score of 82 based on 14 reviews, indicating "universal acclaim".

Pitchfork named Venice the 21st best album of 2004.

== Track listing ==
No.	Title	Length
1.	"Rivers of Sand"	4:42
2.	"Château Rouge"	6:40
3.	"City of Light"	6:34
4.	"Onsra"	0:20
5.	"Circassian"	5:49
6.	"Onsay"	1:08
7.	"The Other Face"	3:25
8.	"Transit"	4:59
9.	"The Point of It All"	5:01
10.	"Laguna"	2:56
11.	"Asusu"	0:55
12.	"The Stone of Impermanence"	6:37
Total length:		49:06

2014 reissue
No.	Title	Length
1.	"The Future Will Be Different"	1:15
2.	"Rivers of Sand"	4:42
3.	"Château Rouge"	6:40
4.	"City of Light"	6:34
5.	"Onsra"	0:20
6.	"Circassian"	5:49
7.	"Onsay"	1:08
8.	"The Other Face"	3:25
9.	"Transit"	4:59
10.	"The Point of It All"	5:01
11.	"Laguna"	2:56
12.	"Asusu"	0:55
13.	"The Stone of Impermanence"	6:37
14.	"Tree"	3:22
Total length:		53:43

== Personnel ==
- Christian Fennesz – guitar, production
- Burkhard Stangl – guitar (on "Circassian" and "Laguna")
- David Sylvian – lyrics and vocals (on "Transit")
