= Simian Angel =

Studio album by Oren Ambarchi
- Released: 5 July 2019
- Recorded: 2016–2018
- Studio: Figure 8 (Brooklyn); Out of My Mind (New Jersey); Choose (Berlin); Duffy's Taxi iPhone (Winnipeg)
- Genre: Experimental
- Length: 36:17
- Label: Editions Mego

Oren Ambarchi chronology
Hubris (2016)	Simian Angel (2019)	Shebang (2022)

Simian Angel is a solo studio album by Australian musician Oren Ambarchi. It was released on 5 July 2019, through Editions Mego. It received universal acclaim from critics.

== Background ==
Simian Angel is Oren Ambarchi's fourth solo studio album on Editions Mego, following Sagittarian Domain (2012), Quixotism (2014), and Hubris (2016). It consists of two side-long songs: "Palm Sugar Candy" and "Simian Angel". It features Brazilian percussionist Cyro Baptista. The album was released on 5 July 2019, through Editions Mego.

== Critical reception ==
Professional ratings
Aggregate scores
Source	Rating
Metacritic	82/100
Review scores
Source	Rating
Exclaim!	8/10
Pitchfork	7.5/10

According to the review aggregator Metacritic, Simian Angel received "universal acclaim" based on a weighted average score of 82 out of 100 from 5 critic scores.

Philip Sherburne of Pitchfork stated, "Both tracks are powered by melodic instincts that have rarely played such a dominant role in Ambarchi's music." He added, "on Simian Angel, we get a glimpse of something new: something sensitive, probing, and even whimsical." Eric Hill of Exclaim! stated, "In its combination of electronics and Brazilian rhythms, it carries echoes of the best Bill Laswell experiments in world music, but with the structural audacity and occasional tension of vintage Gastr Del Sol." He added, "Its explorations are well considered and the rewards for following along are many." Audrey Lockie of SLUG commented that "The album makes a case for musical malleability, as its strengths lie not in Ambarchi's individual ideas as much as in his ability to respond and adapt to each new challenge that faces him."

=== Accolades ===
Year-end lists for Simian Angel
Publication	List	Rank	Ref.
Pitchfork	The Best Experimental Albums of 2019	—	
XLR8R	XLR8R's Best of 2019: Releases	—	

== Track listing ==
Simian Angel track listing
No.	Title	Length
1.	"Palm Sugar Candy"	16:03
2.	"Simian Angel"	20:13
Total length:		36:17

== Personnel ==
Credits adapted from liner notes.

- Oren Ambarchi – guitar, etc., editing, mixing
- Cyro Baptista – percussion, voice
- Randall Dunn – recording
- Iuri Oriente – recording
- Jörg Hiller – recording, editing
- Joe Talia – mixing
- Rashad Becker – lacquer cut
- Konrad Sprenger – executive production
- Dick Wolf – executive production
- Lasse Marhaug – design
- Traianos Pakioufakis – photography
- Kiki Papadopoulou – live photography
