= Christian Görlitz =

German film director and screen writer (1944–2022)

Christian Görlitz (1944 – 10 January 2022) was a German film director.

== Filmography ==
- 1981: Das Ende vom Anfang
- 1984: Auf einem langen Weg (TV film)
- 1985: Laufen, leiden, länger leben (TV film)
- 1985: Der Fahnder (TV series; 1 episode)
- 1986: Die Lokomotive (TV film)
- 1987: Die Bombe (TV film) (also screenplay)
- 1988–1989: Großstadtrevier (TV series; 3 episodes)
- 1991: Der Deal (TV film)
- 1991: Unsere Hagenbecks (TV series; unknown episodes)
- 1991: Müller und Miller (TV series; unknown episodes)
- 1993: Der kleine Vampir – Neue Abenteuer (TV series; unknown episodes)
- 1995: Der König (TV series; unknown episodes)
- 1997: Große Freiheit (TV series; unknown episodes)
- 1997: Freier Fall (TV film)
- 1997: Einsatz Hamburg Süd (TV series; unknown episodes)
- 1998: Das Böse (TV film)
- 1998: Der König – Dr. med. Mord (TV film)
- 1999: Der Preis der Sehnsucht (TV film)
- 2000: Das gestohlene Leben (TV film)
- 2000: Bella Block (TV series; 1 episode)
- 2001: Klaras Hochzeit (aka Olivernbäume) (TV film)
- 2001: Die Verbrechen des Professor Capellari (TV series; 1 episode)
- 2001: Anwalt Abel (TV series; 2 episodes)
- 2002: Mörderherz (TV film)
- 2002: Mord im Haus des Herrn (TV film)
- 2003: Nachts, wenn der Tag beginnt (TV film)
- 2003: Die Geisel (TV film)
- 2004: Das Duo (TV series; 1 episode)
- 2004: Außer Kontrolle (TV film)
- 2004: Kommissar Rex (TV series; 2 episodes)
- 2006: Die Verlorenen (TV film)
- 2006: Mutterglück (TV film)
- 2008: Krauts, Doubts & Rock 'n' Roll
- 2008: Ein Job (TV film)
