= Black Sea (disambiguation) =

The Black Sea is an inland sea between southeastern Europe and Asia Minor.

Black Sea may also refer to:

== Places ==
- Black Sea, another name for Lake Heihai, in China
- Black Sea Region, a coastal area of Turkey
- Ann Street, Boston, US, colloquially known as Black Sea

== Entertainment ==
- Black Sea (XTC album), 1980
- Black Sea (Fennesz album), 2008
- Black Sea Studios, a Bulgarian video game developer
- Black Sea (book), a travel/history book by Neal Ascherson
- Black Sea (film), a 2014 British submarine film starring Jude Law
- Black Sea (2008 film), a drama film
- The Black Sea (film), a 2024 film by Crystal Moselle and Derrick B. Harden
- "The Black Sea", a 1996 song by Orchestral Manoeuvres in the Dark from the album Universal
- "The Black Sea", a song from We Stood Like Kings' album USSR 1926 (2015), a soundtrack for the silent movie A Sixth Part of the World

== Other uses ==
- Black Sea, a call sign of Turkish MNG Airlines
- Battle of Mogadishu (1993), also known as the Battle of the Black sea
