= Agora (Fennesz album) =

Studio album by Fennesz
- Released: 29 March 2019
- Recorded: August–September 2018
- Studio: Kaiserstudios (Vienna)
- Length: 47:06
- Label: Touch

Fennesz chronology
Bécs (2014)	Agora (2019)	Mosaic (2024)

Agora is a solo studio album by Austrian musician Christian Fennesz under the mononym Fennesz. It was released on 29 March 2019 through Touch. It received universal acclaim from critics.

== Background ==
Agora is Fennsz's first solo studio album since Bécs (2014). It was recorded after he had temporarily lost a proper studio space and moved his gear back to a bedroom in his flat. He created the album on headphones, using minimal equipment. The album's title comes from an ancient Greek marketplace.

== Critical reception ==
Professional ratings
Aggregate scores
Source	Rating
Metacritic	81/100
Review scores
Source	Rating
AllMusic	4/5 stars
Exclaim!	7/10
The Line of Best Fit	8/10
Pitchfork	8.5/10
Resident Advisor	4.1/5
Spectrum Culture	3.75/5

According to the review aggregator Metacritic, Agora received "universal acclaim" based on a weighted average score of 81 out of 100 from 10 critic scores.

Paul Simpson of AllMusic stated, "The unpolished feel of Agora is a bit striking for a Fennesz release, but it's clearly just as carefully considered as his other albums, and makes a welcome addition to his catalog." Jack Bray of The Line of Best Fit commented that "Agora is hypnotic, transient and valuable and a rarity which although oppressive at times ultimately delivers on a promise as tangible as it is striking." Mark Richardson of Pitchfork stated, "Each of the four tracks has its own dramatic arc, some subtle and some utterly titanic, and the record as a whole has a cumulative force only possible when those are stacked one atop the other." He added, "there's something special about Agora in how it integrates the immediate pleasure of his pop influences with the patience of his extended works."

=== Accolades ===
Year-end lists for Agora
Publication	List	Rank	Ref.
BrooklynVegan	BrooklynVegan's Top 50 Albums of 2019	34	
Pitchfork	The 50 Best Albums of 2019	8	

== Track listing ==
Agora track listing
No.	Title	Length
1.	"In My Room"	12:28
2.	"Rainfall"	11:57
3.	"Agora"	12:09
4.	"We Trigger the Sun"	10:28
Total length:		47:06

== Personnel ==
Credits adapted from liner notes.

- Katharina Caecilia Fennesz – vocals (2)
- Mira Waldmann – vocals (3)
- Manfred Neuwirth – field recording (3)
- Denis Blackham – mastering
- Jon Wozencroft – photography, design
