= In the Pendulum's Embrace =

Studio album by Oren Ambarchi
- Released: 17 September 2007
- Studio: Jerker House; BJB
- Length: 40:49
- Label: Touch; Southern Lord

Oren Ambarchi chronology
Squire (2006)	In the Pendulum's Embrace (2007)	Grave Temple (2007)

In the Pendulum's Embrace is a solo studio album by Australian musician Oren Ambarchi. It was released in 2007, through Touch and Southern Lord.

== Background ==
In the Pendulum's Embrace was recorded at Jerker House, as well as BJB Studios in Sydney. It consists of three songs: "Fever, a Warm Poison", "Inamorata", and "Trailing Moss in Mystic Glow". "Inamorata" features Veren Grigorov on strings.

In a 2008 interview, Oren Ambarchi said, "The tones are definitely lower than usual." He added, "I just love bass frequencies and I really love somehow juggling really powerful pure tones with really fragile acoustic stuff, you know, somehow making them work together, which is actually really hard."

The album was released in 2007 through Touch and Southern Lord. A vinyl version of the album was later released through Southern Lord.

== Critical reception ==
Professional ratings
Review scores
Source	Rating
AllMusic	4/5 stars
Tiny Mix Tapes	4/5 stars
XLR8R	8/10

John Eyles of BBC stated, "The sound of the guitars remains central, with a strong emphasis on the low end frequencies, other sounds being used primarily for shading and highlighting, to hold the listener's interest and attention." He added, "The music sounds unforced and natural, giving it a soothing sense of calm." Eric Smillie of XLR8R commented that Oren Ambarchi "drops one speaker-vibrating note after another, then lets the tones swell and ripen while laying down a few melodies." He added, "The result is somewhat darker than the last outing, but overall is pretty much the same." Mr P of Tiny Mix Tapes called the album "expansive, harmonious, almost spiritual in its humbling effect."

Peter Margasak of Chicago Reader named it the 25th best album of 2007.

== Track listing ==
All tracks are written by Oren Ambarchi.

In the Pendulum's Embrace track listing
No.	Title	Length
1.	"Fever, a Warm Poison"	17:54
2.	"Inamorata"	10:19
3.	"Trailing Moss in Mystic Glow"	12:36
Total length:		40:49

== Personnel ==
Credits adapted from liner notes.

- Oren Ambarchi – electric guitar, piano (1), glass harmonica (1), drums (1), bells (1, 3), acoustic guitar (3), voice (3), recording, mixing
- Veren Grigorov – strings (2)
- Chris Townend – recording, mixing
- Franc Tetaz – mastering
- Lachlan Carrick – mastering
- Jon Wozencroft – photography
