= Flumen =

Flumen (plural: flumina), the Latin word for river, may refer to:

- A trade name for Chlorothiazide
- Flumen (planetary geology), methane or ethane rivers or channels on Saturn's moon Titan
- Flumen (river), a tributary of the Alcanadre in Spain
- Flumina (album), a 2011 album by Christian Fennesz and Ryuichi Sakamoto
- An accessory cloud
