= Cendre =

Studio album by Fennesz and Sakamoto
- Released: March 28, 2007 (Japan); May 21, 2007 (Europe)
- Studio: Amann Studios, Vienna. KAB Studios, New York City. Legacy Recording Studios, Studio A-509, New York City
- Genre: Ambient
- Length: 52:00
- Label: Touch (Europe) TONE-32; Commmons/Rhythm Zone (Japan) RZCM-45525

Fennesz and Sakamoto chronology
Sala Santa Cecilia (2005)	Cendre (2007)	Flumina (2011)

Professional ratings
Review scores
Source	Rating
AllMusic	4/5 stars
The Observer	3/5 stars
Pitchfork	7.9/10
PopMatters	7/10 stars
Resident Advisor	3.5/5
Headphone Commute	Positive

Cendre is a 2007 studio album, a collaboration between Fennesz and Ryuichi Sakamoto. It follows their previous collaboration on 2005's Sala Santa Cecilia.

== Track listing ==
All songs by Sakamoto and Fennesz.

1. "Oto" – 3:49
2. "Aware" – 4:46
3. "Haru" – 4:39
4. "Trace" – 5:46
5. "Kuni" – 2:24
6. "Mono" – 4:13
7. "Kokoro" – 4:16
8. "Cendre" – 3:09
9. "Amorph" – 5:58
10. "Glow" – 7:12
11. "Abyss" – 5:38

== Personnel ==
- Sakamoto – piano, laptop
- Fennesz – guitar, laptop
- Jon Wozencroft – photography and cover design
- Fernando Aponte – recording engineer
- Kaz Tsujio – piano tuner
- Denis Blackham – mastering @ Skye Mastering
- Mixed by Ryuichi Sakamoto, Christian Fennesz, Fernando Aponte at KAB Studios NYC
