= Quixotic =

Quixotic may refer to:

- Quixotism, deriving from the novel Don Quixote
- Quixotism (album), a 2014 album by Oren Ambarchi
- Quixotic (album), a 2003 album by Martina Topley-Bird
- Quix*o*tic, a Washington D.C.–based rock band
