= Sala Santa Cecilia =

2005 EP by Christian Fennesz and Ryuichi Sakamoto

EP by Fennesz & Ryuichi Sakamoto
- Released: 5 July 2005
- Recorded: 28 November 2004
- Genres: Ambient, glitch
- Length: 19:00
- Label: Touch

Fennesz & Ryuichi Sakamoto chronology
| Sala Santa Cecilia (2005) | Cendre (2007) |

Professional ratings
Review scores
| Source | Rating |
|---|---|
| AllMusic | 4/5 stars |
| Almost Cool | 7/10 |
| Pitchfork | 7.8/10 |

Sala Santa Cecilia is the first collaborative release between Fennesz and Ryuichi Sakamoto. It was recorded live on 28 November 2004 and released 5 July 2005 by Touch. Claudia Engelhart was responsible for recording this at the Auditorium della Parco Musica for the Romaeuropa Festival.

== Track listing ==
1. "Sala Santa Cecilia" – 19:00
