= Behold =

Behold may refer to:

- Behold (furniture polish), an American brand of furniture polish
- "Behold" (song), a song by Phil Wickham and Anne Wilson
- Behold (My Epic album), 2013
- Behold (Oren Ambarchi and Jim O'Rourke album), 2015
- Behold (statue), a statue by Patrick Morelli
