= Grapes from the Estate =

Studio album by Oren Ambarchi
- Released: 22 June 2004
- Studio: Jerker House; Big Jesus Burger; Nomena
- Length: 55:32
- Label: Touch

Oren Ambarchi chronology
Oystered (2003)	Grapes from the Estate (2004)	Strange Love (2004)

Grapes from the Estate is a solo studio album by Australian musician Oren Ambarchi. It was released in 2004, through Touch.

== Background ==
Grapes from the Estate is Oren Ambarchi's third solo studio album for Touch, following Insulation (1999) and Suspension (2001). It consists of four songs: "Corkscrew", "Girl with the Silver Eyes", "Remedios the Beauty", and "Stars Aligned, Webs Spun". Peter Hollo and Veren Grigorov play strings on "Remedios the Beauty". All other instruments are played by Ambarchi.

In a 2024 interview, Ambarchi said, "It sounds like a very relaxed record, but in those days I didn't have a lot of money to go into the studio, so it was done really quickly and quite stressfully."

== Release ==
Grapes from the Estate was originally released on CD in 2004, through Touch. It was followed by a vinyl release in 2006, through Southern Lord. A vinyl version of the album was reissued in 2018, through Black Truffle Records.

== Critical reception ==
Professional ratings
Review scores
Source	Rating
AllMusic	4/5 stars
Pitchfork	7.9/10
Stylus Magazine	C

François Couture of AllMusic stated, "Definitely of the same lineage as the guitarist's previous albums for Touch, this one sees him perfect his art -- the four pieces sound purer and even more focused -- and expand his instrumental palette." Brandon Stosuy of Pitchfork commented that Oren Ambarchi "unwraps the warm chilliness of past efforts, organizing a languid, abstract world of lulling harmonics and slow-drip tones with the on/off attenuation of strings, bells and percussion." He added, "Grapes from the Estate's ambient clusters navigate a field of emptiness." Ron Schepper of Stylus Magazine commented that the album "offers an inviting space that's peaceful and intimate."

== Track listing ==
All tracks are written by Oren Ambarchi.

Grapes from the Estate track listing
No.	Title	Length
1.	"Corkscrew"	9:43
2.	"Girl with the Silver Eyes"	9:39
3.	"Remedios the Beauty"	15:31
4.	"Stars Aligned, Webs Spun"	20:41
Total length:		55:32

== Personnel ==
Credits adapted from liner notes.

- Oren Ambarchi – electric guitar, Hammond organ (2), drums (2, 3), percussion (3), bells (3), acoustic guitar (3), piano (3), recording (1–3), mixing
- Chris Townend – recording (2)
- Peter Hollo – strings (3)
- Veren Grigorov – strings (3)
- Lee Yeoh – recording assistance (3)
- Brett Thompson – additional recording (4)
- Scott Horscroft – recording (3, 4), mixing, mastering
- Jon Wozencroft – photography
