= Mosaic (Fennesz album) =

Studio album by Fennesz
- Released: 6 December 2024
- Recorded: January–May 2024
- Studio: Seven Fountains (Vienna)
- Length: 43:05
- Label: Touch

Fennesz chronology
Agora (2019)	Mosaic (2024)

Mosaic is a solo studio album by Austrian musician Christian Fennesz under the mononym Fennesz. It was released on 6 December 2024 through Touch. It peaked at number 19 on the UK Album Downloads Chart. It received universal acclaim from critics.

== Background ==
Mosaic is Fennesz's first solo studio album since Agora (2019). He released a collaborative studio album with Ozmotic, titled Senzatempo, in 2023. Mosaic was created between 2023 and 2024.

== Critical reception ==
Professional ratings
Aggregate scores
Source	Rating
Metacritic	83/100
Review scores
Source	Rating
AllMusic	4/5 stars
Pitchfork	7.9/10
Spectrum Culture	72%

According to the review aggregator Metacritic, Mosaic received "universal acclaim" based on a weighted average score of 83 out of 100 from 7 critic scores.

Anthony D'Amico of Brainwashed commented that "casual listening only reveals vibes and melodies, but the true beauty of this album lies far more in how it sounds (and how it flows) than it does in the actual chords and melodies being played." Bill Pearis of BrooklynVegan stated, "this record really demands headphone listening or a really good sound system, cranked up to a proper volume so that his meticulously designed atmospheres can really swirl around you." Levi Dayan of The Quietus called the album "Fennesz at his most cinematically emotional." He added, "The catharsis at times risks spilling into soundtrack-type material, but Fennesz's trademark textural warmth keeps the music immersive and involving at all times."

== Track listing ==
Mosaic track listing
No.	Title	Length
1.	"Heliconia"	9:13
2.	"Love and the Framed Insects"	5:54
3.	"Personare"	4:59
4.	"A Man Outside"	6:31
5.	"Patterning Heart"	7:31
6.	"Goniorizon"	8:58
Total length:		43:05

Japan bonus track
No.	Title	Length
7.	"Reversio"	4:09
Total length:		47:18

== Personnel ==
Credits adapted from liner notes.

- Christian Fennesz – recording
- Denis Blackham – mastering
- Jon Wozencroft – photography

== Charts ==
Chart performance for Mosaic
Chart (2024)	Peak position
UK Album Downloads (OCC)	19
