= The Sinking of the Titanic (Bryars) =

Experimental classical work by Gavin Bryars

The Sinking of the Titanic is a work by British minimalist composer Gavin Bryars. The piece is an adaptation of the event that the band on the RMS Titanic continued to perform as the ship sank in 1912; it imagines how the music performed by the band would sound and reverberate through the water as they would have continued—and some time after they ceased—performing. Composed between 1969 and 1972, the work is now considered one of the classics of British contemporary classical music.

== History ==
Bryars' inspiration for the work came from a report that the wireless operator Harold Bride on the Titanic had witnessed the house band continue to perform as the ship sank. In April 1912, Bride had told the New York Times: "[T]he band was still playing. I guess all of the band went down. They were playing "Autumn" then. I swam with all my might. I suppose I was 150 feet away when the Titanic on her nose, with her after-quarter sticking straight up in the air, began to settle - slowly [...] the way the band kept playing was a noble thing [...] and the last I saw of the band, when I was floating out in the sea with my lifebelt on, it was still on deck playing "Autumn". How they ever did it I cannot imagine. That, and the way Phillips (the senior wireless operator) kept sending after the Captain told him his life was his own, and to look out for himself, are two things that stand out in my mind over all the rest [...]"

Bryars imagined that the sound would continue to reverberate as it disappeared under the waves; hence, the piece demonstrates notes gradually being drawn out into drones and lower harmonics. Writing in 1993, Bryars said "the music goes through a number of different states, reflecting an implied slow descent to the ocean bed which give a range of echo and deflection phenomena, allied to considerable high frequency reduction".

The work dates back to 1969, when Bryars wrote a short piece for an exhibition in support of art students at Portsmouth. In keeping with work done by contemporary collective Art & Language, the work was initially a single page of A4 paper with typed instructions. The instructions referred to how the work should sound and how it might be created but were not a score as such.

Bryars frequently participated in the Music Now series of concerts organised by Victor Schonfield in London in the early 1970s, usually with pianist John Tilbury. Schonfield was keen to showcase Bryars' music and in December 1972 organised a concert at London's Queen Elizabeth Hall. The Sinking Of The Titanic would be the centrepiece of the concert. Bryars created a more traditional score for the work and used the Episcopal hymn Autumn as the basis of the work, based on the testimony of wireless operator Harold Bride, although there was some discussion that it may have been actually Aughton that was heard. Bryars incorporated fragments of Aughton and other tunes reportedly heard on the ship. The work has been performed several times in subsequent years, including a performance in San Francisco conducted by John Adams. Other performance venues have included New York's Guggenheim Museum, a Belgian art-nouveau swimming pool and a Huddersfield nightclub.

The work has been described as an "indeterminate" and "open work", which has changed as new information on the disaster comes to light. The work was originally scored for small orchestra and tape, but has expanded to include other sources such as music boxes and turntables.

In 2012, the centennial year of the disaster, the Gavin Bryars Ensemble, Philip Jeck and artists Bill Morrison and Laurie Olinder presented a series of concerts with accompanying archival film images of the Titanic synched live to the music. The concerts were initially performed in cities closely associated with the disaster such as Belfast and Cork, before touring more widely, including a performance at London's Barbican Hall on the anniversary of the disaster.

== Recordings ==
The work was first recorded in 1975 when it became the first release on Brian Eno's Obscure Records. It was subsequently rerecorded in a much longer version in 1990. A third version was released in 2007 in a collaboration with Philip Jeck and Alter Ego.

=== 1975 recording ===
Cover of the 1975 release of The Sinking of the Titanic in 2006

Brian Eno had known Bryars since 1969 when he saw Bryars playing in the Scratch Orchestra at Portsmouth College of Art. In late 1970 Eno contributed woodwind to Bryars' "orchestra" the Portsmouth Sinfonia, along with other performers including Michael Nyman, Kate St. John and Steve Beresford. Eno remained an enthusiastic champion of Bryars' work and had even moved into his flat in Kilburn when he left. In December 1972 Eno had joined his Portsmouth Sinfonia colleagues at the Queen Elizabeth Hall for a guest appearance at Bryars' show which featured the world premier of The Raising of the Titanic (sic).

Eno had been keen on creating a record label in 1973 to release experimental music, but this had come to naught. But in 1975, buoyed by the success of his solo career, he approached Island Records, who were receptive to the idea. That year Obscure Records was launched with four albums released simultaneously. The album with the catalogue number Obscure no.1 consists of Bryars' The Sinking Of The Titanic and Jesus' Blood Never Failed Me Yet. In common with most of the releases on Obscure, it was recorded at Basing Street Studios, engineered by Rhett Davies and produced by Eno himself. Eno said of Bryars' work that, "It was really because I felt so strongly about The Sinking of the Titanic and Jesus' Blood Never Failed Me Yet that I persisted with my idea to have a record label on which to get them released". The album was released in limited numbers and sold out quickly, soon becoming a collector's item.

It was reissued in 1982 on EG Records, catalogue number EGED21, on CD in 1998 on Venture Records, catalogue number CDVE 938, and on Gavin Bryars' GB Records in 2015, catalogue number BCGBCD22..

==== Track listing ====
1. The Sinking of the Titanic (24:40)
2. Jesus' Blood Never Failed Me Yet (25:57)

=== 1990 recording ===
Cover of the 1995 POINT release of The Sinking of the Titanic

On 13–14 April 1990, the Gavin Bryars Ensemble performed the work at the Printemps de Bourges festival in France. Following the discovery of the wreck by Robert Ballard in 1985, Bryars had been keen to revisit the work. The work was radically reworked from the earlier piece and included fragments of interviews with survivors, Morse code signal played on woodblocks and the sound of the iceberg as it collided with the ship amongst other new sources. This performance also included two ensembles of children: an all-girl string ensemble, which included two of Bryars' daughters, and the Wenhaston Boys Choir. The work was performed in a Napoleonic-era water tower; the musicians performed in the basement of the tower and the audience listened on the ground floor. The empty top floors of the water tower acted as a giant reverberation chamber.

Released on Les Disques du Crepuscule, catalogue number TWI 922-2.

Subsequently released on POINT Music, catalogue number 446-061-2 in 1995. Issued in Japan in 1995, in a special edition with Aphex Twin: Raising the Titanic. Reissued in 2009 on LTM/Boutique, catalogue number NL B001VG2MEY

Performed by the Gavin Bryars Ensemble, Wenhaston Boys Choir, Ziella and Orlanda Bryars, Lucy and Camilla Thornton (additional strings)

==== Track listing ====
The Sinking of the Titanic (60'13)

1. Opening Part I (1'57)
2. Titanic Hymn (Autumn) All Strings (5'10)
3. Hymn II (5'26)
4. Interlude (4'35)
5. Hymn III (7'48)
6. Hymn IV (Aughton) (6'25)
7. Opening Part II (6'08)
8. Titanic Lament (5'27)
9. Woodblocks (11:47)
10. Last Hymn (1:47)
11. Coda (4:23)

=== 2005 recording ===
Cover of the 2007 release of The Sinking of the Titanic

In 2005 Bryars was invited by the Italian ensemble Alter Ego to perform the piece at the 49th International Festival of Contemporary Music at the Venice Biennale, and it was performed there at the Teatro Malibran on 1 October 2005 by Bryars with the Alter Ego Ensemble and English turntablist Philip Jeck.

The performance was released on Touch Records in November 2007; catalogue number Touch 34.

==== Track listing ====
1. The Sinking of The Titanic (72'35)
