= Jacob Kirkegaard =

Danish sound artist (born 1975)

Jacob Kirkegaard is a sound artist born in 1975 in Denmark. In early 2006 he graduated at the Academy of Arts and the Media in Cologne, Germany. Jacob is exploring sound in art with a scientific approach.

Jacob Kirkegaard's sound works focus on investigations into the potential musicality in hidden sound layers in the environment. In this context he has been capturing and exploring sounds from, for example, volcanic earth, ice, atmospheric phenomena, nuclear power plants and deserted places. His piece "Labyrinthitis" was created from sounds recorded inside his inner ear. Recording tools used include accelometers, hydrophones and home-built electromagnetic receivers.

== Discography ==
- (1989) Escape from the Outside (Self titled cassette release)
- (1990) A New Youth (Self titled cassette release)
- (1998) Luftantenner - in the band Æter (Helicopter Records)
- (2002) Soaked - with Philip Jeck Touch
- (2003) 01.02 (Bottrop-boy)
- (2005) Eldfjall Touch
- (2006) 4 Rooms Touch
- (2008) Labyrinthitis Touch
- (2008) Forget to Breathe - with Lydia Lunch
- (2011) Aion (Fonik Works)
- (2012) Imperia (with Tobias Kirstein) Posh Isolation
- (2012) Svævninger - with Else Marie Pade (Important Records)
- (2013) Conversion (Touch)
- (2014) 40 Days of Silence (VON Archives)
- (2015) Arc (Holotype Editions)
- (2015) 5 Pieces (Posh Isolation)
- (2016) Sabulation (mAtter)
- (2017) Descending - with Niels Lyhne Løkkegaard (Important Records)
- (2019) Phonurgia Metallis (Important Records)
- (2019) Black Metal Square (Important Records)
- (2019) Opus Mors (Topos)
- (2025) Snowblind (The Helen Scarsdale Agency)
