= Blue Moon (2002 film) =

- Directed by: Andrea Maria Dusl
- Written by: Andrea Maria Dusl
- Produced by: Erich Lackner; Klaus Pridnig
- Starring: Detlev Buck; Josef Hader
- Cinematography: Wolfgang Thaler
- Edited by: Karina Ressler; Andrea Wagner
- Release date: 2002
- Country: Austria

Blue Moon is a 2002 Austrian movie written and directed by Andrea Maria Dusl. The road movie romantic comedy is Dusl's first as a director.

== Plot ==
In a month with two full moons, Austrian petty criminal Johnny Pichler is hired to carry a bag of cash to the Slovakian border and deliver it to a gangster. Johnny arrives late in a battered taxi. He is forced into the car behind the gangster's beautiful but unhappy escort. Shirley, who is no bimbo, squirts the gangster with an incapacitating spray, kicks him out of the car and races away with Johnny and the cash. The pair makes a series of unsuccessful attempts to sell the obviously stolen car. In a Slovak hotel Johnny offers to buy Shirley's share of the car with his share of the cash. She refuses but when he returns from the bar, she is gone.

Lonely Johnny teams up with Ignaz Springer, an East German con man who is having trouble adapting to post-Communist Europe, but claims to have business interests in Ukraine: shoe import-export. Springer introduces Johnny to a couple of Slovak waitresses and then disappears after selling the car without Johnny's knowledge. Johnny hitchhikes to Ukraine looking for Shirley with only the town Lviv stamped on a strip of photographs as a guide. In Lviv he meets a taxi driver who differs from Shirley only in her hair colour. Jana reveals that she is Shirley's twin sister and they soon become lovers. Jana tells him that Shirley's real name is Dana and that she had left Lviv some months ago after a bout of craziness. Johnny soon discovers that Jana is not being entirely honest with him. And the city is hardly welcoming: a gang force him to buy an ordinary brick from them with all the money that he has. He follows Jana to Kyiv and finally to Odesa on the Black Sea, where he is also reunited with Springer. The movie ends on a ferry as the blue moon rises and the final scene explains the enigmatic opening scene on the Odesa Steps (made famous by The Battleship Potemkin).

Dusl sees the love that develops between Johnny and Jana as a metaphor for the relationship between the east and the west. More inspiration for the film may have come from a transatlantic romantic entanglement with an American whom she visited before going into production.

== Cast ==
- Josef Hader (Johnny Pichler)
- Detlev Buck (Ignaz Springer)
- Victoria Malektorovych (Shirley/Dana/Jana)
- Ivan Laca (Mafioso Kovacic)
- Peter Aczel (Car Dealer)
- Andrea Karnasová (Vlasta, Waitress)
- Emöke Vinczeová (Ludmila, Waitress)
- Orest Ohorodnyk (Jewgenij Pazukin)
- Serhiy Romaniuk (Ukrainian Truck Driver)
- Alla Maslenikova (Teacher)
- Katya Volkova (Teacher's Daughter Nastja)
- Borys Heorhiyevsky (Militia Officer)

== Production ==
- Written and Directed by Andrea Maria Dusl
- Cinematography Wolfgang Thaler
- Music composed by Christian Fennesz, Peter Dusl, Yuriy Naumov, Camille Saint-Saëns, Dmitriy Shostakovich, Richard Rodgers (Blue Moon)
- Editors Karina Ressler, Andrea Wagner
- Line Producer Max Linder
- First Assistant Director and Casting Klaus Pridnig
- Producer Erich Lackner, Klaus Pridnig

Shot in German, English, Ukrainian, Russian and Slovak, the movie is available with English subtitles.
