= B. J. Nilsen =

Swedish sound artist (born 1975)

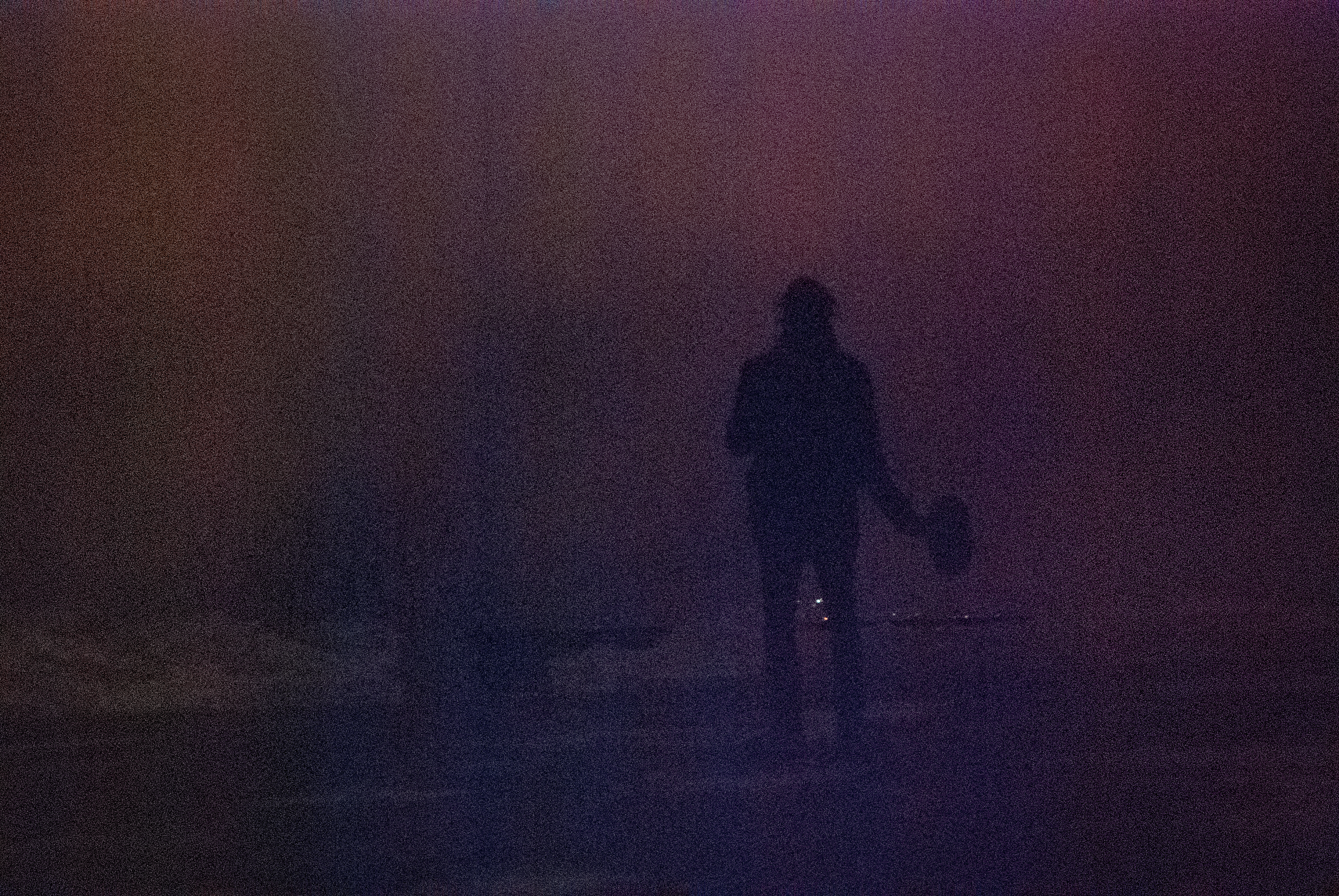

Background information
- Also known as: Hazard
- Born: Benny Jonas Nilsen; 1975 (age 50–51)
- Origin: Sweden
- Occupations: Sound artist, composer
- Website: bjnilsen.info

Benny Jonas Nilsen (born 1975), alias BJ Nilsen, BJNilsen, and Hazard, is a Swedish sound artist based in Amsterdam.

His work primarily focuses on the sounds of nature and how they affect humans. Recent work has explored the urban acoustic realm and industrial geography in the Arctic region of Norway and Russia. His original scores and soundtracks have been used in theatre, dance performances and film. He and Jóhann Jóhannsson did the soundtrack for I Am Here.

== Partial discography ==
- 1991 - This Crying Age (Cold Meat Industry)
- 1992 - Spindrift (Cold Meat Industry)
- 1996 - Lech (Malignant Records)
- 1999 - North (Ash International)
- 2000 - Wood c/w Bridge/Field (Ash International)
- 2001 - Wind in collaboration with Chris Watson (Ash International)
- 2003 - Land (Touch)
- 2004 - Live at Konzerthaus, Vienna (06_12_03 - (Touch)
- 2005 - Fade to White (Touch)
- 2005 - Víkinga Brennivín in collaboration with Stilluppsteypa (Helen Scarsdale Agency)
- 2006 - "Sov Gott" appears on a split 12" with Milan Sandbleistift (Licht-Ung)
- 2006 - Drykkjuvísur Ohljódanna in collaboration with Stilluppsteypa (Helen Scarsdale Agency)
- 2007 - The Short Night (Touch)
- 2007 - Second Childhood in collaboration with Hildur Gudnadóttir an Stilluppsteypa (Quecksilber)
- 2007 - 22' 22" in collaboration with Z'ev (iDEAL Recordings)
- 2008 - Passing Out in collaboration with Stilluppsteypa (Helen Scarsdale Agency)
- 2009 - Man From Deep River in collaboration with Stilluppsteypa (Editions Mego)
- 2010 - The Invisible City (Touch)
- 2010 - Draught #1 cassette (Ash International)
- 2010 - Space Finale with Stilluppsteypa on cassette & double LP (Editions Mego)
- 2013 - "Nijmegen Pulse" with Alan Courtis. (CD, Album, Ltd - (Korm Plastics)
- 2013 - "Eye Of The Microphone" (Touch)
- 2014 - "Release The DATs" (The Wormhole)
- 2015 - "I am here" with Jóhann Jóhannsson / Ash 11.1
- 2015 - "unearthed" USB card, Images by Karl Lemieux / Dark Ecology/Sonic Acts
- 2017 - "Terroir" 3"CD (Ferns Recordings)
