= Oren Ambarchi =

Australian musician (born 1969)

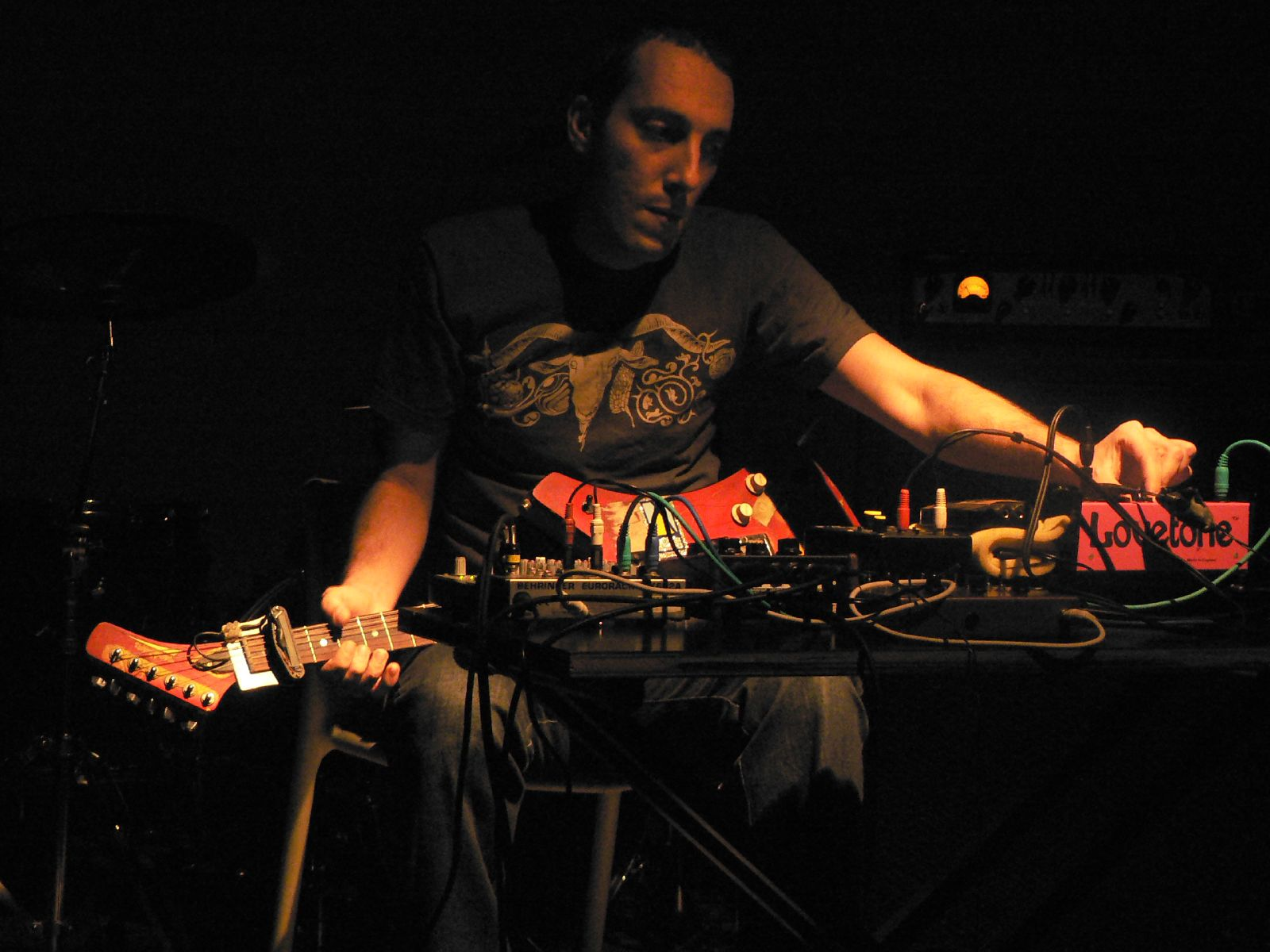
- Oren Ambarchi, Japan, 2007

Background information
- Born: 1969 (age 56–57); Sydney, Australia
- Genres: Avant-garde; free improvisation; jazz; rock; electronic; ambient; noise
- Occupation: Multi-instrumentalist
- Instruments: Guitar; drums
- Years active: 1986–present
- Labels: Black Truffle; Drag City; Editions Mego; Table of the Elements; Touch
- Member of: Burial Chamber Trio; Gravetemple; Sun
- Website: www.orenambarchi.com

Oren Ambarchi (born 1969) is an Australian musician. He is a multi-instrumentalist who plays mainly electric guitar and percussion.

== Biography ==
Oren Ambarchi was born in Sydney to an Iraqi Jewish family. Ambarchi has been performing live since 1986. In the late 1980s he played free jazz in Sydney, originally as a drummer. In an interview with ABC Radio broadcaster, Jon Rose, Ambarchi described how he started playing guitar:

There happened to be one laying around in our rehearsal room. I picked it up and starting hitting it with drumsticks and using it in whatever way I wanted to use it in, and one thing led to another. I'm glad I wasn't trained. I've always loved rock music, I grew up listening to pop and rock, so that was in my mind, but I've also been interested in electronics. I never wanted to learn to play it properly, it was an object as much as an instrument.

His work focuses mainly on the exploration of the guitar, though he also plays drums and percussion in some of his live performances.

Along with longtime collaborator, drummer Robbie Avenaim, he co-organised the 'What Is Music' Festival in various cities in Australia from 1994 to 2005.

Ambarchi contributed to drone metal band Sunn O)))'s Black One album in 2005, and became a regular live performer with the band for the next several years, as well as contributing to the Oracle EP and Monoliths & Dimensions album.

In 2009 Ambarchi begins a series of trio performances in Japan with multi-instrumentalist Jim O'Rourke and iconic Japanese musician/singer Keiji Haino. This meeting was recorded and released in 2010 under the title 'Tima Formosa' on Black Truffle records. This trio collaboration continues annually at the renowned Tokyo venue Super Deluxe. Each concert is documented and released on Ambarchi's Black Truffle label. the first one being the acclaimed 'Indeed' in 2011.

In 2017 he began working with American composer Alvin Lucier, performing new compositions for electric guitar.

Ambarchi has run the record label Black Truffle since 2009.

With Jim O'Rourke, Ambarchi has released three collaborative albums: Indeed (2011), Behold (2015), and Hence (2018).

He also released solo albums Sagittarian Domain (2012), Quixotism (2014), Hubris (2016), and Simian Angel (2019), through Editions Mego. He released Shebang (2022) through Drag City.

With Johan Berthling and Andreas Werliin, he has released three collaborative albums: Ghosted (2022), Ghosted II (2024), and Ghosted III (2025).

== Selected discography ==
=== Albums ===
- Stacte (Jerker Productions, 1998)
- Stacte.2 (Jerker Productions, 1999)
- The Alter Rebbe's Nigun (with Robbie Avenaim; Tzadik, 1999)
- Insulation (Touch, 1999)
- Persona (ERS, 2000)
- Afternoon Tea (with Christian Fennesz, Paul Gough, Peter Rehberg, and Keith Rowe; Ritornell, 2000)
- Reconnaissance (with Martin Ng; Staubgold, 2000)
- Stacte.3 (Plate Lunch, 2000)
- Suspension (Touch, 2001)
- Sun (with Chris Townend, as Sun; Preservation, 2001)
- Honey Pie (with Robbie Avenaim and Keith Rowe; Grob, 2002)
- Thumb (with Robbie Avenaim, Keith Rowe, Otomo Yoshihide, and Sachiko M; Grob, 2002)
- Flypaper (with Keith Rowe; Staubgold, 2002)
- Mort aux Vaches (Staalplaat, 2002)
- Stacte.4 (En/Of, 2002)
- Triste (Idea Records/Southern Lord, 2003)
- Vigil (with Martin Ng; Quecksilber, 2003)
- My Days Are Darker than Your Nights (with Johan Berthling; Häpna, 2003)
- Oystered (with Günter Müller and Voice Crack; Audiosphere, 2003)
- Grapes from the Estate (Touch/Southern Lord, 2004)
- Strange Love (with Günter Müller and Philip Samartzis; For4Ears, 2004)
- Cloud (with Keith Rowe, Toshimaru Nakamura, and Christian Fennesz; Erstwhile, 2005)
- Squire (with Keith Rowe; For4Ears, 2006)
- Stacte Motors (Western Vinyl, 2006)
- Willow Weep and Moan for Me (with Tetuzi Akiyama and Alan Licht; Antiopic, 2006)
- In the Pendulum's Embrace (Touch, 2007)
- Lost Like a Star (Bo'Weavil, 2007)
- I'll Be the Same (with Chris Townend, as Sun; Preservation, 2007)
- The Holy Down (with Stephen O'Malley and Attila Csihar, as Gravetemple; Southern Lord, 2007)
- Burial Chamber Trio (with Greg Anderson and Attila Csihar, as Burial Chamber Trio; Southern Lord, 2007)
- Spirit Transform Me (with Z'EV; Tzadik, 2008)
- A Final Kiss on Poisoned Cheeks (Table of the Elements, 2008)
- הופעה באוגנדה (Uganda, 2008)
- Tima Formosa (with Keiji Haino and Jim O'Rourke; Black Truffle, 2010)
- Hit & Run (with Joe Talia; Touch, 2011)
- Indeed (with Jim O'Rourke; Editions Mego, 2011)
- In a Flash Everything Comes Together as One There Is No Need for a Subject (with Keiji Haino and Jim O'Rourke; Black Truffle/Medama, 2011)
- Dream Request (with Robbie Avenaim; Bo'Weavil, 2011)
- The Mortimer Trap (with Thomas Brinkmann; Black Truffle, 2012)
- Audience of One (Touch, 2012)
- Connected (with Robin Fox; Kranky, 2012)
- In the Mouth – a Hand (with Fire!; Rune Grammofon, 2012)
- Black Plume (with Keith Rowe and Crys Cole; Bocian, 2012)
- Raga Ooty / The Nilgiri Plateau (Bo'Weavil, 2012)
- Sagittarian Domain (Editions Mego, 2012)
- Wreckage (with James Rushford; Prisma, 2012)
- Nazoranai (with Keiji Haino and Stephen O'Malley; Editions Mego, 2012)
- Cat's Squirrel (with Merzbow; Black Truffle/Hospital Hill, 2013)
- Quixotism (Editions Mego, 2014)
- Tikkun (with Richard Pinhas; Cuneiform Records, 2014)
- Behold (with Jim O'Rourke; Editions Mego, 2015)
- Hubris (Editions Mego, 2016)
- Hotel Record (with Crys Cole; Black Truffle, 2017)
- Face Time (with Kassel Jaeger and James Rushford; Black Truffle, 2018)
- Hence (with Jim O'Rourke; Editions Mego, 2018)
- Simian Angel (Editions Mego, 2019)
- Oglon Day (with Mark Fell, Will Guthrie, and Sam Shalabi; 33 33, 2019)
- Dreamlet (ATTN:SPAN, 2020)
- Live Hubris (Black Truffle, 2021)
- Ghosted (with Andreas Werliin and Johan Berthling; Drag City, 2022)
- Shebang (Drag City, 2022)
- Ghosted II (with Andreas Werliin and Johan Berthling; Drag City, 2024)
- With Pats on the Head, Just One Too Few Is Evil One Too Many Is Good That's All It Is (with Keiji Heino and Jim O'Rourke; Black Truffle/Medama Records, 2024)
- Ghosted III (with Johan Berthling and Andreas Werliin; Drag City, 2025)
- Kind Regards (with Eric Thielemans; AD 93, 2025)
- Dragon's Return (with Fredrik Rasten; Viernulvier, 2025)
- Cooked (Drag City, 2026)

=== Contributions ===
- Tim Hecker – Mirages (Alien8, 2004)
- Sunn O))) – Black One (Southern Lord, 2005)
- Sunn O))) – Oracle (Southern Lord, 2007)
- Sunn O))) – Monoliths & Dimensions (Southern Lord, 2009)
- Sunn O))) – Kannon (Southern Lord, 2015)
