= Philip Jeck =

English composer and artist (1952–2022)

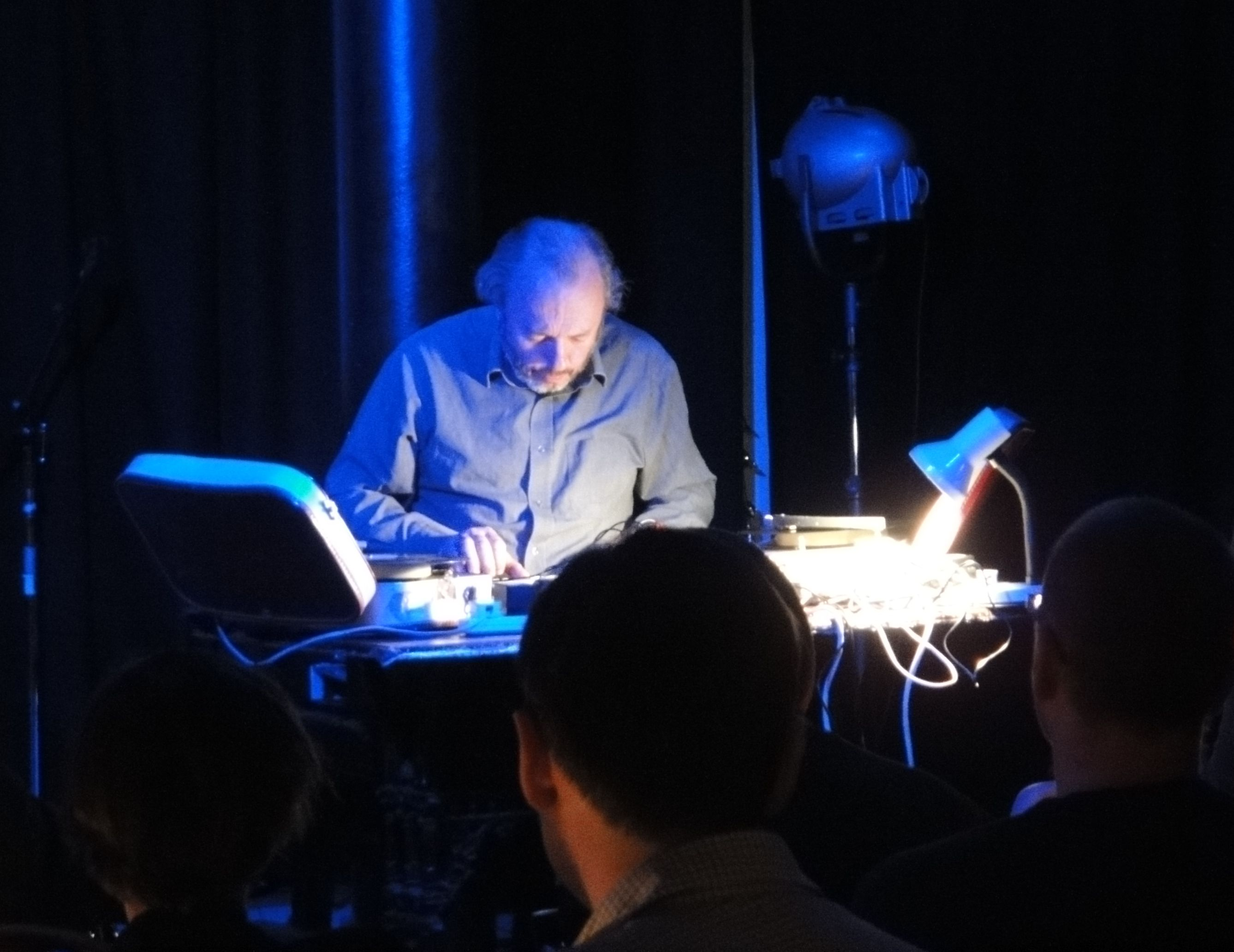
- Jeck performing in 2011

Background information
- Born: 15 November 1952
- Origin: Cambridge, England
- Died: 25 March 2022 (aged 69) Liverpool, England
- Genres: Turntablism; ambient; avant-garde; electronic; hauntology
- Occupations: Musician; visual artist
- Instruments: Turntable; Casio SK-1; MiniDisc; mixer; bass guitar; effects pedal
- Years active: 1980s–2022
- Labels: Touch; Intermedium
- Website: www.philipjeck.com

Philip Jeck (15 November 1952 – 25 March 2022) was an English composer and multimedia artist. His compositions were noted for utilising antique turntables and vinyl records, along with looping devices and both analogue and digital effects. Initially composing for installations and dance companies, beginning in 1995 he released music on the UK label Touch.

== Early life ==
Jeck was born in England in 1952. He studied visual arts at Dartington College of Arts in Devon. He became interested in record players after visiting New York in 1979 and being introduced to the work of DJs such as Walter Gibbons and Larry Levan.

== Career ==
Jeck started exploring composition using record players and electronics in the early 1980s. In his early career, he composed and performed scores for dance and theatre companies, including a five-year collaboration with Laurie Booth. He also composed scores for dance films Beyond Zero on Channel 4 and Pace on BBC 2. Jeck was perhaps best known for his 1993 work Vinyl Requiem with Lol Sargent, a performance for 180 Dansette record players, 12 slide-projectors and two film-projectors. Although he initially intended to perform it only once, he went on to organise further performances of the installation. It won the Time Out Performance Award in 1993.

Jeck signed with Touch in 1995 and proceeded to release his best-known works on the label, including Surf (1998), Stoke (2002), and 7 (2003). In 2004, he collaborated with Alter Ego on a 2005 rendition of composer Gavin Bryars's The Sinking of the Titanic. His 2008 album, Sand, was named the second best album of that year by The Wire. Many of his studio releases are pieced together from recordings of his own live performances and stitched together with a MiniDisc recorder. His final music credit came in 2021 with Stardust, a collaboration with Faith Coloccia.

He collaborated with artists including Jah Wobble, Jaki Liebezeit, David Sylvian and Janek Schaefer.

== Death ==
Jeck died on 25 March 2022, aged 69, following a brief illness.

== The Philip Jeck Foundation ==
On the initiative of his family, Mary Prestidge & Louis Jeck, a board of trustees was established to set up The Philip Jeck Foundation, which raises funds and distributes grants to artists whose work reflects the experimental approach of Philip Jeck.

== Discography ==
=== Studio and live recordings ===
- Loopholes (1995, Touch)
- Surf (1998, Touch)
- Live in Tokyo (2000, Touch)
- Vinyl Coda I–III (2 CDs) (2000, Intermedium Records)
- Vinyl Coda IV (2001, Intermedium Records)
- Stoke (2002, Touch)
- 7 (2003, Touch)
- Sand (2008, Touch)
- Suite. Live in Liverpool (2008, Touch)
- An Ark for the Listener (2010, Touch)
- Cardinal (2015, Touch)
- Iklectik (2017, Touch)
- Vinyl Requiem (2026, Touch)

=== Collaborations ===
- Soaked with Jacob Kirkegaard (2002, Touch)
- Live in Leuven with Jah Wobble and Jaki Liebezeit (2004, Hertz)
- Songs for Europe with Janek Schaefer (2004, Asphodel)
- The Sinking of the Titanic with Alter Ego and Gavin Bryars (2007, Touch)
- Spliced with Marcus Davidson (2010, Touch)
- Stardust with Faith Coloccia (2021, Touch)
- Oxmardyke with Chris Watson (2023, Touch)
