= Soliman Gamil =

Egyptian composer (1924–1994)

- Born: December 24, 1924; Alexandria
- Died: June 13, 1994 (aged 69)
- Occupations: Composer; Musician

Soliman Gamil (Arabic: سليمان جميل; 24 December 1924 in Alexandria, Egypt – 13 June 1994) was an Egyptian composer and qanun player. In 1963, he began to experiment with the use of Egyptian traditional musical instruments in his compositions for films and theater, in an effort to evoke the sounds of Ancient Egypt.

He also wrote about music for the Al-Ahram newspaper.

== Discography ==
- 1979 - Die Ägyptische Musik. Egyptian State Information Service BAR1.
- 1982 - L'Art Du Qânûn Egyptien. Arion ARN 36696.
- 1987 - The Egyptian Music. Touch TO:7.
- 1990 - Ankh. Touch TO:14.
- 1997 - A Map of Egypt Before the Sands. Touch T33.15.

== See also ==
- List of Egyptian composers
