= Maxim Mehmet =

German actor (born 1975)

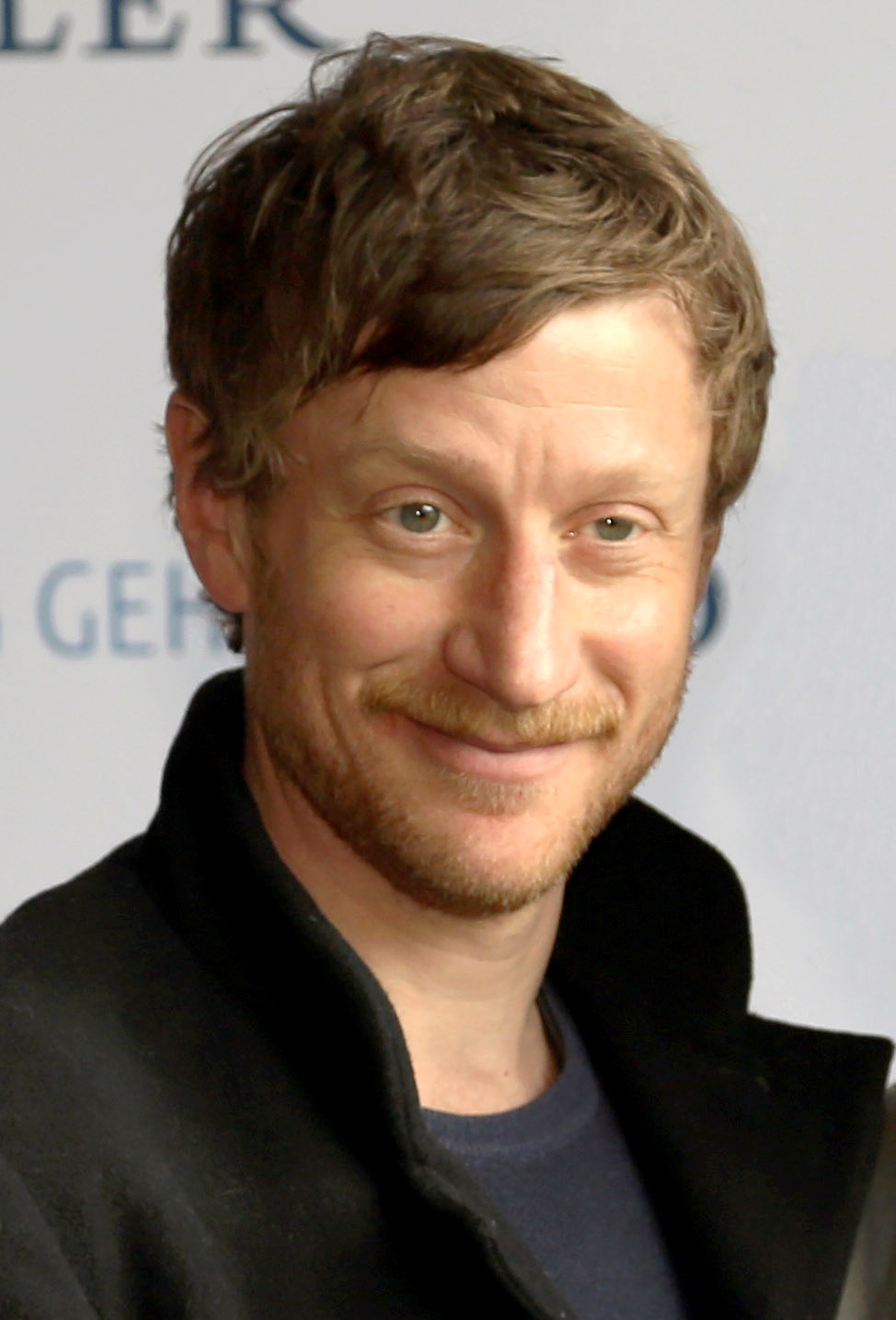
- Mehmet in 2015
- Born: 2 July 1975 (age 50); Kassel, West Germany
- Occupation: Actor
- Years active: 1998–present

Maxim Mehmet (born 2 July 1975) is a German actor. He inherited his surname from his Crimean Tatar grandfather. He lived with his spouse in Berlin before he moved to Vienna.

== Selected filmography ==
- NVA (2005)
- A Hero's Welcome (2008)
- The Red Baron (2008)
- Tatort (since 2008, TV series)
- Ein Job (2008)
- Krauts, Doubts & Rock 'n' Roll (2008)
- Men in the City (2009)
- Beloved Berlin Wall (2009)
- The Good Neighbour (2011)
- Faust (2011)
- Deckname Luna (2012, TV film)
- Generation War (2013, TV miniseries)
- A Faithful Husband (2014, TV film)
- My Skinny Sister (2015)
- Heidi (2015)
