= Bécs (album) =

Studio album by Fennesz
- Released: 28 April 2014
- Recorded: 2013–2014
- Studio: Amann (Vienna)
- Genres: Electronica; ambient; glitch
- Length: 43:27
- Label: Editions Mego

Fennesz chronology
Black Sea (2008)	Bécs (2014)	Agora (2019)

Bécs is the sixth studio album by Austrian electronic music producer and guitarist Fennesz, released 28 April 2014 by Editions Mego. The album has been described as a conceptual and sonic successor to Fennesz's well-received 2001 album Endless Summer and is his first solo release since 2008's Black Sea.

== Background ==
Bécs is described as a departure from the drone music influences of Black Sea, instead featuring contemporary pop music structures. Pitchfork noted the album's "twinkly and bright" melodies, with the album's use of distortion "(walking) a tightrope between oceanic envelopment and repellant destruction."

The track "Paroles" is notable for a stripped-down sound that does not feature as many audio effects as most of Fennesz's work.

== Critical reception ==
Professional ratings
Aggregate scores
Source	Rating
AnyDecentMusic?	8.1/10
Metacritic	86/100
Review scores
Source	Rating
AllMusic	4.5/5 stars
Exclaim!	9/10
Fact	4/5
Mojo	4/5 stars
Pitchfork	7.8/10
PopMatters	8/10
Sputnikmusic	3.8/5
Tiny Mix Tapes	4/5 stars
Tom Hull	B+
Uncut	9/10

Bécs was well-received by critics upon release; it currently holds a score of 86 from Metacritic, indicating "universal acclaim".

London-based music magazine Uncut praised the album, calling it "an entirely ravishing aesthetic experience." Exclaim! published a similarly adulatory review, writing that, "With Bécs, Fennesz achieves the near-impossible, crafting a musical sequel that retains the energy, vision, and flow of its predecessor."

Pitchfork gave Bécs a generally positive review, remarking that it was "often gorgeous" but arguing that its sonic similarity to Endless Summer "makes you wonder about motivation."

=== Accolades ===
Year-end lists for Bécs
Publication	List	Rank	Ref.
Tiny Mix Tapes	Favorite 50 Music Releases of 2014	32	
Uncut	The Best Albums of 2014	38	

== Track listing ==
All tracks are written by Christian Fennesz, except "Sav" by Fennesz and Cédric Stevens.

Bécs track listing
No.	Title	Length
1.	"Static Kings"	5:46
2.	"The Liar"	4:37
3.	"Liminality"	10:00
4.	"Pallas Athene"	6:10
5.	"Bécs"	5:43
6.	"Sav"	7:35
7.	"Paroles"	3:36
Total length:		43:27

== Personnel ==
Credits adapted from liner notes.

- Werner Dafeldecker – bass guitar (1)
- Martin Brandlmayr – drums (1)
- Tony Buck – drums (3)
- Martin Siewert – drums recording (3)
- Cédric Stevens – modular synthesizer (6)
- Rashad Becker – mastering
- Tina Frank – cover design
