= Hubris (Oren Ambarchi album) =

Studio album by Oren Ambarchi
- Released: 11 November 2016
- Recorded: April 2015–February 2016
- Studios: The Upper Lounge (Rotherham); Choose (Berlin); Villalobos (Berlin); Steamroom (Tokyo); Stranger Weather (Brooklyn); Chinatown (Melbourne); Jerker House (Melbourne); MY (Nantes)
- Genres: Experimental; avant-garde
- Length: 40:14
- Label: Editions Mego

Oren Ambarchi chronology
Quixotism (2014)	Hubris (2016)	Simian Angel (2019)

Hubris is a studio album by Australian musician Oren Ambarchi. It was released on 11 November 2016, through Editions Mego. It received universal acclaim from critics.

== Development and release ==
Hubris continues "the exploration of relentless, driving rhythms" of Oren Ambarchi's Sagittarian Domain (2012) and Quixotism (2014). It features contributions from Crys Cole, Mark Fell, Will Guthrie, Arto Lindsay, Jim O'Rourke, Konrad Sprenger, Joe Talia, Ricardo Villalobos, and Keith Fullerton Whitman. In a 2024 interview, Ambarchi recalled, "the album slowly expanded during my tour – that's why there's so many different people from all over the world on that record." The album's title is derived from a William Friedkin autobiography. The album was released on 11 November 2016, through Editions Mego.

Ricardo Villalobos' remixes of Hubris were released as Hubris Variation (2016) and Hubris Variation Parts 2 & 3 (2020). The 2019 live recording of Hubris was released as Live Hubris (2021).

Hubris was re-released as a 10th anniversary remastered edition on 24 April 2026, through Black Truffle. It was remastered by Joe Talia.

== Critical reception ==
Professional ratings
Aggregate scores
Source	Rating
Metacritic	83/100
Review scores
Source	Rating
Crack	7/10
Exclaim!	8/10
Pitchfork	7.5/10
Resident Advisor	4.1/5
Tiny Mix Tapes	4/5 stars

According to the review aggregator Metacritic, Hubris received "universal acclaim" based on a weighted average score of 83 out of 100 from 7 critic scores.

Daniel Sylvester of Exclaim! stated, "On Hubris, Oren Ambarchi displays the confidence to allow a jumble of musicians and sounds to come off like a beautifully orchestrated, high-concept piece." Jo Kali of Crack commented that "Each additional collaborator helps the rhythms throughout this album gesture towards an almost transcendental state." Lisa Blanning of Resident Advisor wrote, "what makes this record feel special is how naturally it moves to occupy a space between classical minimalism, jazz, rock and electronic music."

=== Accolades ===
Year-end lists for Hubris
Publication	List	Rank	Ref.
Crack	Albums of the Year 2016	56	
The Quietus	The Quietus Albums of the Year 2016	59	
Thump	The 33 Best Albums of 2016	18	
Tiny Mix Tapes	2016: Favorite 50 Music Releases	45	
Uncut	Top 75 Albums of 2016	72	
The Wire	Releases of the Year (Rewind 2016)	14	

== Track listing ==
Hubris track listing
No.	Title	Length
1.	"Hubris Part 1"	21:47
2.	"Hubris Part 2"	1:53
3.	"Hubris Part 3"	16:34
Total length:		40:14

== Personnel ==
Credits adapted from liner notes.

- Oren Ambarchi – guitar, voice, engineering, mixing
- Mark Fell – computer (1), engineering
- Konrad Sprenger – motor guitar (1)
- Jim O'Rourke – guitar (1), guitar synthesizer (1), six-string bass (2), engineering
- Crys Cole – voice (2, 3)
- Arto Lindsay – guitar (3)
- Joe Talia – bass guitar (3), drums (3), engineering, mixing
- Will Guthrie – drums (3)
- Ricardo Villalobos – rhythms (3), electronics (3), engineering
- Keith Fullerton Whitman – synthesizer (3)
- Jörg Hiller – engineering
- Yann Jaffiol – engineering
- Daniel Schlett – engineering
- Rashad Becker – mastering
- Stephen O'Malley – design
- Daniel Druet – sculptures
- Estelle Hanania – photography
