= Black One (album) =

2005 album by Sunn O)))

Studio album by Sunn O)))
- Released: October 17, 2005
- Recorded: May 2005
- Genre: Drone metal; dark ambient; avant-garde; black metal; post-metal
- Length: 67:11
- Label: Southern Lord

Sunn O))) chronology
White2 (2004)	Black One (2005)	Altar (2006)

Professional ratings
Review scores
Source	Rating
AllMusic	4.5/5 stars
Pitchfork	(8.9/10)
PopMatters	(8/10)
Stylus Magazine	A

Black One is the fifth studio album by American drone metal band Sunn O))). As the title implies, the album is very black metal-influenced, utilizing many guest musicians of the genre, including Malefic and Wrest from Xasthur and Leviathan, respectively. Malefic, a sufferer of claustrophobia, was allegedly locked in a casket during his recorded performance to the vocals on the track "Báthory Erzsébet".

2,000 copies included a bonus disc titled Solstitium Fulminate, containing a mix of live performances recorded at Roskilde Festival in 2005 and the immediately preceding European tour.

"Orthodox Caveman", previously known as "Caveman Salad", is based on live material from the White (see Live White) tour. "Báthory Erzsébet" was recorded as a tribute to Quorthon (as well as the countess who inspired Bathory's name) and, according to an interview with Terrorizer magazine, is loosely built "around a really slowed down riff from 'A Fine Day to Die'".

== Track listing ==
=== Black One ===
1. "Sin Nanna" – 2:19
  - Oren Ambarchi: vocals, bowed cymbals, flies, drums, el. guitars, atmos
2. "It Took the Night to Believe" – 5:56
  - Mystik Fogg Invokator: axe, subs
  - Taoiseach: lead guitar, subs
  - Wrest: voices
3. "Cursed Realms (Of the Winterdemons)" (Immortal Cover) – 10:10
  - Mystik Fogg Invokator: icy inverted crosswinds upon four string zamboni
  - MK Ultra Blizzard: grail, eclipse, lead guitar
  - M. Schneeberger: glacial winds
  - John Wiese: whiteout
  - Malefic: voice
4. "Orthodox Caveman" – 10:02
  - Mystik Fogg Invokator: guitar, riffs
  - Caveman Skillz: guitar, bass, feedback
  - Oren Ambarchi: caveman drums
5. "CandleGoat" – 8:04
  - Mystik Fogg Invokator: guitar, taurus
  - MK Ultra Blizzard: decimator bass, crypt calls
  - John Wiese: casket electronics
  - Malefic: tundra guitar
6. "Cry for the Weeper" – 14:38
  - Mystik Fogg Invokator: guitar, keyboards
  - SOMA: guitar, virus
  - Malefic: guitar, keyboards
  - Oren Ambarchi: el. guitars, horns, wood
7. "Báthory Erzsébet" – 16:00
  - Mystik Fogg Invokator: bass
  - Drone Slut: bass
  - Count Von Schneeberger: virus
  - Malefic: calls from beyond the grave
  - Oren Ambarchi: el. guitars, tubular bells, cymbals, gong

=== Solstitium Fulminate (limited edition bonus disc) ===
1. "Wine & Fog" – 21:29
2. "Vlad Tepes" – 16:43
  - Guitar L: Greg Anderson
  - Guitar R: Stephen O'Malley
  - Vocals: Attila Csihar
  - Guitar/electronics: Oren Ambarchi
  - Analog synths: TOS Nieuwenhuizen

== Black One musicians ==
- Malefic (Xasthur)
- Wrest (Leviathan, Lurker of Chalice)
- Oren Ambarchi
- John Wiese (Bastard Noise, Sissy Spacek)
- Mathias Schneeberger (credited as Count Von Schneeberger)
- Greg Anderson (credited as Mystik Fogg Invokator)
- Stephen O'Malley (credited as MK Ultra Blizzard, SOMA, Caveman Skullz, Taoiseach, and Drone Slut)
