= Flumina (album) =

Studio album by Fennesz + Sakamoto
- Released: August 3, 2011
- Recorded: Amann Studios, Vienna; KA+B Studios, New York City; Japan
- Genre: Ambient
- Label: Commmons (JP); RZCM 46910-1; Touch (UK); Tone 46

Fennesz + Sakamoto chronology
Cendre (2007)	Flumina (2011)

Flumina is a 2011 double studio album by musicians Fennesz and Ryuichi Sakamoto, following their previous collaboration Cendre, released in 2007.

== Critical reception ==
Professional ratings
Aggregate scores
Source	Rating
Metacritic	76/100
Review scores
Source	Rating
AllMusic	3.5/5 stars

According to the review aggregator Metacritic, Flumina received "generally favorable reviews" based on a weighted average score of 76 out of 100 from 7 critic scores.

== Track listing ==
Disc one

1. "0318" – 4:27
2. "0319" – 5:39
3. "0320" – 4:42
4. "0322" – 5:34
5. "0324" – 6:48
6. "0325" – 4:20
7. "0327" – 5:29
8. "0328" – 5:29
9. "0330" – 4:44
10. "0401" – 4:55
11. "0402" – 6:15
12. "0404" – 4:34

Disc two

1. "0405" – 4:50
2. "0407" – 4:37
3. "0409" – 4:52
4. "0411" – 5:22
5. "0415" – 5:13
6. "0417" – 3:44
7. "0419" – 4:59
8. "0423" – 5:17
9. "0424" – 4:27
10. "0425" – 6:56
11. "0428" – 4:54
12. "0429" – 5:58

== Personnel ==
- Ryuichi Sakamoto – piano, laptop
- Christian Fennesz – guitar, laptop
