= Andrea Maria Dusl =

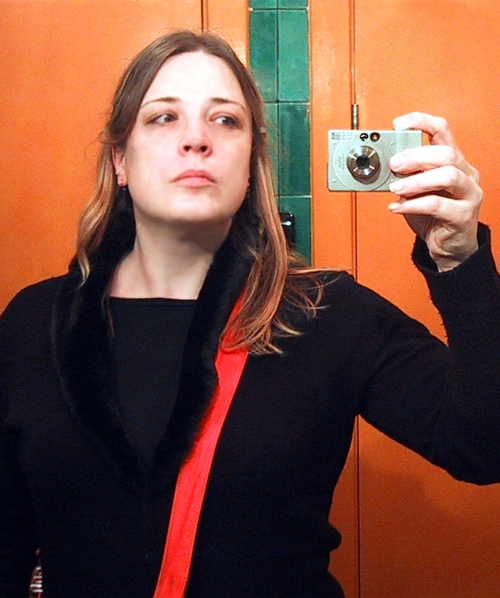
Andrea Maria Dusl

Andrea Maria Dusl (born 12 August 1961), is an Austrian/Swedish film director, author and illustrator.

== Early life ==
She was born in Vienna, the daughter of Austrian architect Erwin H. Dusl and Swedish captain's family Pettersson's descendant Monica Jüllig.

== Education ==
Between 1981 and 1985 she studied stage design at Vienna's Akademie der Bildenden Künste and promoted as Master of Arts. She worked as assistant stage designer at Vienna's Burgtheater, Akademietheater (under the direction of George Tabori), Theater an der Wien, Theater in der Josefstadt and Wiener Staatsoper. Between 1993 and 1997 she attended medical studies at Universität Wien (University of Vienna).

== Career ==
Since 1985 she has been writing and illustrating for Austrian newspapers and magazines. Her columns Comandantina Dusilova and Fragen Sie Frau Andrea ("Ask Miss Andrea"), published in Austria's weekly magazine Falter have many fans among urban and liberal readers.

In 2003 Falter published the paperback Fragen Sie Frau Andrea. In 2007 Residenz Verlag published Dusl's book Die österreichische Oberfläche (The Austrian Surface). The novels Boboville (2008) and "Channel 8" (2010) were published by Residenz Verlag. In 2012 Dusl wrote "Ins Hotel konnte ich ihn nicht mitnehmen" (I could not take him to the hotel) for the Viennese publisher Metroverlag.

In 2001 she shot her first feature film Blue Moon starring Austrian stand-up comedian Josef Hader, Ukrainian actress Victoria Malektorovych and German helmer-actor Detlev Buck. Blue Moon premiered at the 2002 Locarno International Film Festival. Awards: (2003 Grand Prix for Best Austrian Film (Graz, Diagonale). 2003 Special Jury Prize (Łagów Film Festival, Łagów, Poland) and Variety Critic's Choice of Europe's 10 Best Films, Karlovy Vary International Film Festival, Czech Republic, 2004 Best Script (Graz, Diagonale)).

In 2006 she has hosted Redezeit, a monthly political discussion at Viennas "off-broadway"-theater Rabenhof.

== Films ==
- Around the World in Eighty Days (In Achtzig Tagen um die Welt), (1989/1991) (6 shorts)
- Blue Moon, (2002)
- Heavy Burschi, (2005) (short)

== Books ==
- Fragen Sie Frau Andrea, 107 fantastische Kolumnen, 2003, Falter Verlag, Wien
- Die österreichische Oberfläche, Essays, 2007, Residenz Verlag, St. Pölten
- Boboville, novel, 2008, Residenz Verlag, St. Pölten
- Channel 8, novel, 2010, Residenz Verlag, St. Pölten
- Ins Hotel konnte ich ihn nicht mitnehmen, stories, 2012, Metroverlag, Wien
