= Ghosted (album) =

Studio album by Oren Ambarchi, Johan Berthling, and Andreas Werliin
- Released: 15 April 2022
- Recorded: November 2018
- Studio: Rymden (Stockholm, Sweden)
- Length: 38:08
- Label: Drag City

Oren Ambarchi, Johan Berthling, and Andreas Werliin chronology
| Ghosted (2022) | Ghosted II (2024) |

Ghosted is a collaborative studio album by Oren Ambarchi, Johan Berthling, and Andreas Werliin. It was released on 15 April 2022, through Drag City. It received universal acclaim from critics.

== Background ==
Oren Ambarchi is an Australian guitarist; Johan Berthling is a Swedish bassist; Andreas Werliin is a Swedish drummer. The trio recorded Ghosted at Studio Rymden in Stockholm, Sweden, in November 2018. The album consists of four tracks. "I" features a guest appearance from Christer Bothén on donso n'goni. Music videos were released for "II" and "III". The album was released on 15 April 2022, through Drag City. It was followed by Ghosted II (2024).

== Critical reception ==
Professional ratings
Aggregate scores
| Source | Rating |
|---|---|
| Metacritic | 84/100 |
Review scores
| Source | Rating |
| DownBeat | 4/5 stars |
| Mojo | 4/5 stars |
| Pitchfork | 8.0/10 |
| Spectrum Culture | 78% |
| Uncut | 8/10 |

According to the review aggregator Metacritic, Ghosted received "universal acclaim" based on a weighted average score of 84 out of 100 from 6 critic scores.

Daryl Worthington of The Quietus stated, "The trio explore the relationship between repetition and difference that's long been a fascination in exploratory music, creating something that, disorientatingly, sounds equal parts quantized and free-flowing." Philip Sherburne of Pitchfork wrote, "The music swims with darting shapes, flickering traces of energy, that feel almost supernatural in origin."

=== Accolades ===
Year-end lists for Ghosted
| Publication | List | Rank | Ref. |
|---|---|---|---|
| The Guardian | The 50 Best Albums of 2022 | 33 | |
| The Quietus | Quietus Albums of the Year 2022 | 27 | |
| Uncut | Top 75 Albums of 2022 | 57 | |
| The Wire | Releases of the Year (2022 Rewind) | 48 | |

== Track listing ==
All tracks are written by Oren Ambarchi, Johan Berthling, and Andreas Werliin.

Ghosted track listing
| No. | Title | Length |
|---|---|---|
| 1. | "I" | 8:01 |
| 2. | "II" | 9:32 |
| 3. | "III" | 15:49 |
| 4. | "IV" | 4:44 |
| Total length: | | 38:08 |

== Personnel ==
Credits adapted from liner notes.

- Oren Ambarchi – guitar, mixing
- Johan Berthling – double bass, bass guitar
- Andreas Werliin – drums
- Christer Bothén – donso n'goni (on "I")
- Daniel Bengtsson – recording
- Joe Talia – mixing, mastering
- Pål Dybwik – cover image
- Dan Osborn – layout
