= Ein Job =

2008 film

- Written by: Irene Dische; Christian Görlitz
- Directed by: Christian Görlitz
- Starring: Vanessa Redgrave; Victoria Malektorovych; Maxim Mehmet; Martin Brambach; Volker Michalowski; Judith Steinhäuser; Anna Fischer
- Theme music composer: Vlady Cnejevici
- Country of origin: Germany
- Original language: German

Production
- Producers: Susanne Freyer; Tommy Kroepels
- Cinematography: Johannes Geyer
- Editor: Klaus Dudenhöfer
- Running time: 89 minutes

Original release
- Release: 2008

Ein Job is a 2008 German television film based on Irene Dische's novel The Job. It was directed by Christian Görlitz and stars British actress Vanessa Redgrave. The German-language production was filmed in Hamburg.

== Plot ==
Victorija (Malektorovych), is a Ukrainian assassin in Hamburg on assignment for the Russian mafia to commit a triple murder. But things are complicated by her neighbour, Hannah (Redgrave) an ageing radical anarchist and Azad (Mehmet), a Turk living in Germany illegally.

== Cast ==
- Vanessa Redgrave as Hannah Silbergrau
- Victoria Malektorovych as Victorija
- Maxim Mehmet as Azad Mem
- Martin Brambach as Bollinger
- Volker Michalowski as Addie
- Judith Steinhäuser as Raisa Gnedenko
- Anna Fischer as Junges Taximädchen

Additional cast;

- Angelika Gersdorf as Kundin
- Kailas Mahadevan as Fahrgast Schlachthof
- Fritz Roth as Boris Gnedenko
