= Leopold Lummerstorfer =

Austrian filmmaker (born 1968)

Leopold Lummerstorfer (born 1968 in Gramastetten, Austria) is an Austrian film director, author and producer. He resides in Vienna and near Kapuvár.

Leopold Lummerstorfer is one of the younger directors of the new Austrian cinema. As early as 19, he made his first long film “My Country in Pink”, an adventurous feature with underground, cult character. He studied ethnology and philosophy at the University of Vienna, worked in very diverse occupations such as road construction worker, journalist, estate manager, long-distance heating supervisor and youth social worker. Parallel to this, he made a set of short features as well as documentary films, including “The Dream That Remains”, a film “that goes from a social study to a gentle, true satire without much effort. A surprise success for domestic cinema, in artistic value and in public numbers and a politically alert as well as amusing film” (Die Presse). His films usually highlight a social focus, which he brings to the screen, documentarily or fictionally, by means of accurate narrative structure. His last feature, “White Cherries” (with Martin Puntigam, Josef Hader, and Maria Hofstätter), was acclaimed as the, up to then, most successful new generation film in Austrian cinema. His work has received numerous festival invitations (among others, San Francisco, São Paulo, Saarbruecken, Istanbul, Cinéma du réel Paris) and awards. Leopold Lummerstorfer lives in Vienna, where he also now regularly directs the ORF feature, “Show without a Name”, an individual youth format with most satisfying viewer numbers, also above the 50.

== Films ==
- 2011-2021 "Science Busters" (TV -series, ORF/3Sat, 106 episodes, 20/30/45/60min; Director/Co-Screenplay)
- 2005: "Deaf-mute lane", short, 4min. (original title: "Taubstummengasse")
- 2003-07: "Show without a name", TV-series. (original title: "Sendung ohne Namen" a.k.a. SON) - episodes directed by Leopold Lummerstorfer:
  - "Sleep“ - SON 37, 10/2003, 25mins., guests: Heather Nova, Thomas Maurer, Florian Scheuba
  - „Drugs“ - SON 42, 11/2003, 25mins., guests: Shantel, Chicks on Speed, Christoph Krall
  - „Pain“ - SON 45, 12/2003, 25mins., guests: The Mars Volta, Wohlstandskinder
  - „Family partys“ - SON 47, 1/2003, 25mins., guests: Peaches, Garish
  - „Appropriation“ - SON 49, 1/2004, 25mins., guests: Hans Platzgumer, Kurt Palm
  - „Germany“ - SON 51, 2/2004, 25mins., guests: Tomte, Texta
  - „Office work“ - SON 55, 3/2004, 25mins., guests: The Offspring, Georg Friedrich
  - „Birthdays“ - SON 62, 6/2004, 25mins., guests: Morgan Spurlock, Die Sterne, Max Herre
  - „Extremism“ - SON 65, 9/2004, 25mins., guests: Beatsteaks, Willi Resetarits, Gerald Votava
  - „Vienna“ - SON 70, 12/2004, 25mins., guests: Moritz Bleibtreu, Vera Borek, Hansi Lang, Thomas Rabitsch, Wolfgang Schlögl
  - „Vision“ - SON 78, 10/2005, 25mins., guests: Gerard Malanga, Antonin Swoboda
  - „Freewill“ - SON 82, 11/2005, 25mins., guests: Herbert Rosendorfer, Michael Glawogger
  - „Gifts“ - SON 85, 12/2005, 25mins., guests: Weezer, Kante
  - „Love of Animals“ - SON 92, 3/2006, 25mins., guests: Katie Melua, Detlef Buck
  - „To emigrate“ - SON 97, 10/2006, 25mins., guests: Sugarplumfairy, Thomas Glavinic
  - „New Years Special“ - SON 101, 12/2006, 25mins., guests: Two Gallants, Didi Bruckmayr, Prof. Heinz Oberhummer
  - „On Ice“ - SON 105, 2/2007, 25mins., guests: Electric Indigo, Wally Salner
  - „Insanity“ - SON 113, 4/2007, 30mins., guests: Scissor Sisters, Plexus Solaire
- 2000: "White Cherries", feature f., 86mins. (orig. title: "Gelbe Kirschen")
- 1996: "The dream that remains", doc., 155mins. ( a.k.a. "Der Traum der bleibt")
- 1995: "Vienne en densant", short, 18mins.
- 1993: "Some time with Joseph", doc., 70mins. ("Tage mit Josef")
- 1992: "A letter for You", 15mins. / "The land surveyour", 20mins. / part for "Wienminuten", episodic film, 44 min.
- 1990: "My country in pink", feature f., 83min. (a.k.a. "Rosa Heimat")
- 1987: "Walking", short, 10min.

== Awards ==
- Film scholarship 2003, Austrian Federal Chancellery
- Foundation award „Film Art“ 1998, Austrian Federal Chancellery
- Talent award 1997 of Upper Austria for documentary films
- Vienna film award 1996: Special mention
- Script award 1995 Upper Austria
