= Behold (Oren Ambarchi and Jim O'Rourke album) =

Studio album by Oren Ambarchi and Jim O'Rourke
- Released: 3 March 2015
- Recorded: 2012–2013
- Studio: Steamroom (Tokyo); SuperDeluxe (Tokyo); Chinatown (Melbourne)
- Genre: Experimental; ambient
- Length: 42:06
- Label: Editions Mego

Oren Ambarchi and Jim O'Rourke chronology
Indeed (2011)	Behold (2015)	Hence (2018)

Behold is the second collaborative studio album by Australian musician Oren Ambarchi and American musician Jim O'Rourke. It was released on 3 March 2015 through Editions Mego. It received universal acclaim from critics.

== Background ==
In the 1990s, Oren Ambarchi met Jim O'Rourke in New York, where O'Rourke spotted Ambarchi in a Merzbow T-shirt walking down the street. In a 2024 interview, Ambarchi said, "We're the same age and we love a lot of the same things."

Behold is the duo's first collaborative studio album since Indeed (2011). It consists of two side-long tracks: "Behold A" and "Behold B". On the album, Ambarchi plays guitar and drums, while O'Rourke plays synthesizer and piano. The album is said to blend "field recordings, electronics, guitar, drums and other acoustic instruments into a subtle combination of krautrock, minimalism and classic free flowing electronics."

== Critical reception ==
Professional ratings
Aggregate scores
Source	Rating
Metacritic	83/100
Review scores
Source	Rating
Exclaim!	5/10
Pitchfork	7.6/10
Tiny Mix Tapes	4/5 stars
Uncut	8/10

According to the review aggregator Metacritic, Behold received "universal acclaim" based on a weighted average score of 83 out of 100 from 6 critic scores.

Danny Riley of The Quietus stated, "Over the course of two lengthy tracks, experimental mainstays Ambarchi and O'Rourke present a masterful exposition in control; concealing and foregrounding different sounds, pitching moments of abstraction against the delayed revelation of tangible musical ideas, bringing different textural, tonal and rhythmic themes in and out of focus." Philip Sherburne of Pitchfork commented that "What most separates Behold from Indeed is the new album's strong sense of groove, with Ambarchi carving deep patterns with ride cymbals and hi-hats and ultra-low, chest-caving kick drums." Marshall Gu of Bandcamp Daily stated, "As the rhythm is almost omnipresent through the album's 42 minutes, Behold is unique among O'Rourke's collaborative albums."

=== Accolades ===
Year-end lists for Behold
Publication	List	Rank	Ref.
Pitchfork	The Best Experimental Albums of 2015	20	
The Quietus	The Quietus Albums of 2015	65	

== Track listing ==
Behold track listing
No.	Title	Length
1.	"Behold A"	18:43
2.	"Behold B"	23:23
Total length:		42:06

== Personnel ==
Credits adapted from liner notes.

- Oren Ambarchi – guitar, drums, etc.
- Jim O'Rourke – synthesizer, piano, etc.
- Masahide Ando – additional recording
- Joe Talia – additional recording
- CGB – lacquer cut
- Stephen O'Malley – sleeve/type design
- Shunichiro Okada – photography
