= Der König =

- Starring: Günter Strack
- Country of origin: Germany

Der König is a German television series.

== See also ==
- List of German television series
