= Black Sea (Fennesz album) =

Studio album by Fennesz
- Released: November 25, 2008
- Genre: Ambient, glitch
- Length: 52:02
- Label: Touch

Fennesz chronology
Venice (2004)	Black Sea (2008)	Bécs (2014)

Alternative Cover
- LP Cover

Black Sea is the fourth studio album by the Austrian electronic musician Fennesz. The LP was released on November 25, 2008, while a CD release followed on December 9, 2008 with different artwork. The track "Saffron Revolution" was released as a single prior to the release of the album.

== Critical reception ==
Professional ratings
Aggregate scores
Source	Rating
Metacritic	80/100
Review scores
Source	Rating
AllMusic	4/5 stars
The Phoenix	4/4 stars
Pitchfork	8.4/10
Slant Magazine	3/5 stars
Headphone Commute	no rating
PopMatters	7/10
Resident Advisor	4/5 stars

According to the review aggregator Metacritic, Black Sea received "generally favorable reviews" based on a weighted average score of 80 out of 100 from 12 critic scores.

== Track listing ==
1. "Black Sea" - 10:11
2. "The Colour of Three" - 8:06
3. "Perfume For Winter" - 4:35
4. "Grey Scale" - 4:09
5. "Glide" - 9:22
6. "Vacuum" - 3:58
7. "Glass Ceiling" - 5:49
8. "Saffron Revolution" - 5:52

Tracks 2 and 6 do not appear on the vinyl version.
