= Victoria Malektorovych =

Ukrainian actress

- Born: Viktoriya Volodymyrivna Malektorovych; 11 February 1972 (age 53); Yenakiieve, Ukrainian SSR, Soviet Union
- Citizenship: Ukraine
- Occupation: Actress
- Spouse: Klaus Pridnig

Viktoriya Volodymyrivna Malektorovych (Note: Ukrainian: Вікторія Володимирівна Малекторович) (born 11 February 1972), known professionally as Victoria Malektorovych, is a Ukrainian actress.

== Biography ==
At the age of 17, Malektorovych studied at the Ukrainian Drama School in Kyiv and then acted at the National Drama Theater of Ukraine there, as well as in Russian and Ukrainian films and series. She also presented radio and television programs. She made her debut as an actress as Shirley/Jana in the 2022 Austrian feature Film Blue Moon.

== Honors ==
At the 3rd International Film Festival "Brigantine" held in Berdyansk in 2000, Malektorovych was honored as the best actress.

== Personal life ==
Malektorovych lives in Kyiv and Vienna, is married to the Austrian producer Klaus Pridnig and is the mother of a son.

== Filmography ==
- 2002: Blue Moon
- 2006: Mutterglück
- 2007: The Debt
- 2008: Ein Job
- 2011: Lyublyu 9 marta! (Fernsehfilm)
- 2012: Blood of War
- 2013: SOKO Wien Folge: Schneewitchen
- 2013: Luka
- 2016: Toni Erdmann
