= Endless Summer (Fennesz album) =

Studio album by Fennesz
- Released: 3 July 2001
- Genres: Electronica; glitch; ambient; noise; electro-acoustic
- Length: 44:38
- Label: Mego
- Producer: Christian Fennesz

Fennesz chronology
Live at Revolver, Melbourne (2000)	Endless Summer (2001)	Field Recordings: 1995–2002 (2002)

Reissue cover

Endless Summer is an album by Austrian electronic music producer and guitarist Fennesz, released on 3 July 2001 by independent label Mego. The title was derived from the 1960s surf documentary by Bruce Brown, and is also shared with a 1974 compilation album by the Beach Boys. The album features Fennesz's melodic guitar run through digital processing and glitch textures.

The album brought Fennesz critical recognition and became "a hit in left-field electronica." It was reissued in 2006 in a new mix with two bonus tracks and new cover art. It was named among the best albums of the decade by publications such as Pitchfork, Fact, and Resident Advisor.

== Background ==
Fennesz recorded the album on a limited equipment setup consisting of a laptop, one Shure SM57 microphone, a few guitars, and a few pedals. Speaking to RBMA in 2008, he recalled that "I think I was inspired at that time, it was a good period of my life and ideas came so easily." The album employs melody and guitar chords, with Fennesz explaining that "many of my colleagues, the people around me, were doing really abstract electronic music – melody was forbidden. I didn’t agree with that at all, I wanted to bring back things I’d been fascinated with in the past, [...] I wanted to combine that with new digital technology, Max/MSP."

The album title was intended to be in reference to the 1960s surf documentary The Endless Summer; Fennesz was not aware that it shared a title with a 1970s compilation by The Beach Boys, adding that "I was influenced by their music, but it wasn’t as intentional as it seemed."

== Critical reception ==
Professional ratings
Review scores
Source	Rating
AllMusic	5/5 stars
The Boston Phoenix	4/4 stars
Muzik	5/5
NME	8/10
Pitchfork	9.4/10
Resident Advisor	5/5
Stylus Magazine	B+
Uncut	5/5 stars

=== Early response ===
Writing for NME in 2001, John Mulvey described the album as "weirdly blissful, possessing an indefinable emotional pull," and noted the influence of "Brian Wilson's most elegiac, wistful music," proving that "experimental new music can understand and revitalise old traditions, that the avant-garde doesn't have to be grey and terrifying." AllMusic critic François Couture stated that the album "puts the emphasis on sunny melodies [...], but drowns them in glitch textures," summarizing it as "brilliantly conceived and masterfully executed" but also noting that the result "strikes and disconcerts." I. Khider of Exclaim! called it "the electronic album of the year" and stated that "Fennesz processes and manipulates the source material by taking the pulse of the pop tune and rebuilding something deeply sentimental and sweet."

=== Legacy ===
Reviewing the album's 2006 reissue, The Boston Phoenix's Matthew Gasteier called Endless Summer "a turning point in experimental electronic music, the moment when melody and cacophony learned to love one another," and labeled it a "fuzzed-out masterpiece" in the lineage of My Bloody Valentine and the Jesus and Mary Chain." Nate Dorr of PopMatters called it "the most pivotal, most accessible, and most strikingly unique point in the Fennesz catalogue so far, and one of the more influential noise albums of the early decade."

Discussing the album's impact on electronic music for Resident Advisor in 2007, Joshua Meggitt stated that when compared to Fennesz's "flickering electro-acoustic haze, much of the work by his clicks n' cuts contemporaries sounded po-faced, cerebral and cold [...] Fennesz invested the laptop with a soul hitherto reserved for 'real' instruments." Meggitt also noted the album's references to "the whole discourse of sea-and-surf inspired music, literally evoking the rolling waves with grainy, often turbulent fields of noise," along with the influence of 1950s exotica.

In 2017, Pitchfork named Endless Summer the 22nd best ambient album of all time.

=== Accolades ===
Publication/Author	Accolade	Rank
Fact	The Top 100 Albums of the 2000s	23
Pitchfork	Top 20 Albums of 2001	2
Pitchfork	The Top 200 Albums of the 2000s	26
Pitchfork	The 50 Best Ambient Albums of All Time	22
Resident Advisor	Top 100 Albums of the '00s	41
Tiny Mix Tapes	Favorite 100 Albums of 2000–2009	14

== Track listing ==
No.	Title	Length
1.	"Made in Hong Kong"	4:22
2.	"Endless Summer"	8:35
3.	"A Year in a Minute"	6:01
4.	"Caecilia"	3:53
5.	"Got to Move On"	3:48
6.	"Shisheido"	2:58
7.	"Before I Leave"	4:06
8.	"Happy Audio"	10:55
Total length:		44:38

2006 reissue bonus tracks
No.	Title	Length
9.	"Badminton Girl"	4:06
10.	"Endless"	2:01
Total length:		50:45

== Personnel ==
- Fennesz – music, production
- Street Romance – mastering
- Tina Frank – cover
- Hertha Hurnaus – photography
