= Sagittarian Domain =

Studio album by Oren Ambarchi
- Released: 28 August 2012
- Recorded: 26 May 2011; 11 October 2011 (strings)
- Studio: Sing Sing, Melbourne; Chinatown, Melbourne (strings)
- Length: 33:35
- Label: Editions Mego

Oren Ambarchi chronology
| Audience of One (2012) | Sagittarian Domain (2012) | Quixotism (2014) |

Sagittarian Domain is a solo studio album by Australian musician Oren Ambarchi. It was released on 28 August 2012, through Editions Mego. It received generally favorable reviews from critics.

== Background ==
Oren Ambarchi was asked to make some music for a film installation by a Melbourne visual artist. Ambarchi recalled, "There was no brief or much direction from him on what exactly was required." Sagittarian Domain consists of one 33-minute song. Ambarchi's parts were recorded in one studio session. The song also includes contributions from a string trio of Elizabeth Welsh on violin, James Rushford on viola, and Judith Hamann on cello, which were recorded in a separate studio session. Rushford wrote the strings arrangement. The song was featured in Benedict Andrews' production of Every Breath at Belvoir St Theatre in Sydney, in early 2012.

== Critical reception ==
Professional ratings
Aggregate scores
| Source | Rating |
|---|---|
| Metacritic | 78/100 |
Review scores
| Source | Rating |
| AllMusic | 4/5 stars |
| Beats Per Minute | 65% |
| Pitchfork | 7.3/10 |
| PopMatters | 8/10 |
| Tiny Mix Tapes | 3/5 stars |

According to the review aggregator Metacritic, Sagittarian Domain received "generally favorable reviews" based on a weighted average score of 78 out of 100 from 9 critic scores.

Russell Cuzner of The Quietus commented that Oren Ambarchi "has forged an exquisitely balanced and powerful sound whose apparent simplicity belies a multi-layered exercise in displacement and resolution." Ian Mathers of PopMatters called the album "an excellent example of what Ambarchi can do almost entirely working on his own." Paul Haney of Tiny Mix Tapes stated, "Sagittarian Domain is a noble quasi-failure, an enjoyable and driven jam that, despite its reliance on certain tired tropes of its obvious Krautrock influences, nevertheless succeeds when it focuses its exploration on texture." Alex Phillimore of Beats Per Minute wrote, "It's not accessible by any means, and it isn't immediately gratifying; instead, it's an album that requires investments of time and patience, and one that could easily put a lot of people off due to its high-demand style."

=== Accolades ===
Year-end lists for Sagittarian Domain
| Publication | List | Rank | Ref. |
|---|---|---|---|
| The Quietus | The Quietus Albums of the Year 2012 | 40 | |

== Track listing ==
Sagittarian Domain track listing
| No. | Title | Length |
|---|---|---|
| 1. | "Sagittarian Domain" | 33:35 |

== Personnel ==
Credits adapted from liner notes.

- Oren Ambarchi – guitar, Moog bass, drums, percussion, voice, mixing
- Elizabeth Welsh – violin
- James Rushford – viola, strings arrangement
- Judith Hamann – cello
- Lachlan Carrick – recording, mastering
- Joe Talia – strings recording, mixing
- Shunichiro Okada – photography
