= Quixotism (album) =

Studio album by Oren Ambarchi
- Released: 28 October 2014
- Recorded: 2012–2014
- Studio: Max Ernst (Cologne); Harpa (Reykjavík); Melbourne; Avast! (Seattle); London; Cyclops Sound (Los Angeles); Steamroom (Tokyo)
- Genre: Experimental
- Length: 46:48
- Label: Editions Mego

Oren Ambarchi chronology
Sagittarian Domain (2012)	Quixotism (2014)	Hubris (2016)

Quixotism is a studio album by Australian musician Oren Ambarchi. It was released on 28 October 2014, through Editions Mego. It received universal acclaim from critics.

== Background ==
Quixotism is Oren Ambarchi's first studio album on Editions Mego since Sagittarian Domain (2012). The album consists of one continuous 47-minute piece divided up into five sections. It was recorded in Cologne, Reykjavík, Melbourne, Seattle, London, Los Angeles, and Tokyo. It features contributions from Thomas Brinkmann, Matt Chamberlain, Crys Cole, Eyvind Kang, Jim O'Rourke, John Tilbury, U-zhaan, Ilan Volkov, and the Icelandic Symphony Orchestra. The album was initially planned to be released on 29 September 2014, but postponed due to a problem with test pressings. It was released on 28 October 2014, through Editions Mego.

Quixotism was re-released as a 10th anniversary remastered edition on 18 October 2024, through Black Truffle. It was remastered by Joe Talia.

== Critical reception ==
Professional ratings
Aggregate scores
Source	Rating
Metacritic	81/100
Review scores
Source	Rating
AllMusic	3.5/5 stars
Exclaim!	9/10
Fact	4/5 stars
Resident Advisor	4.0/5
Tiny Mix Tapes	4/5 stars
Wondering Sound	4/5 stars

According to the review aggregator Metacritic, Quixotism received "universal acclaim" based on a weighted average score of 81 out of 100 from 7 critic scores.

Fred Thomas of AllMusic described the album as "one of Ambarchi's more involved and dense compositions, seeing the composer boil down more than two years' worth of recordings with dozens of collaborators into a single album in five parts." Maya Kalev of Fact wrote, "As its title suggests, Quixotism's narrative arc is obscure, and as such the album contains no real highlights or low points; instead, each part maintains a discrete identity of its own, serving both as groundwork for each subsequent part and the basis for its counterpoint." She added, "Like so many of Ambarchi's recent works, Quixotism hinges on the tension between continuity and contradiction, perhaps more so than ever."

Bryon Hayes of Exclaim! commented that "Quixotism is an exhilarating ride, from the extended fade-in introduction, through the bouncy percussion workout at mid-point, and onward to the snaking strings and electronics that lead to the album's conclusion." He added, "The complexity, the subtle dynamics and the overall propulsive pulse of the music all nod toward the grace, restraint and talent of a visionary musician with boundless inspiration backed up by a host of musically proficient friends." Andrew Ryce of Resident Advisor stated, "For an artist who has traditionally experimented with recording methods, Quixotism is another landmark, thanks largely to how natural it sounds in spite of its ambitious approach."

=== Accolades ===
Year-end lists for Quixotism
Publication	List	Rank	Ref.
The Wire	Releases of the Year (Rewind 2014)	43	

== Track listing ==
Quixotism track listing
No.	Title	Length
1.	"Quixotism Part 1"	17:58
2.	"Quixotism Part 2"	4:09
3.	"Quixotism Part 3"	6:58
4.	"Quixotism Part 4"	2:59
5.	"Quixotism Part 5"	14:44
Total length:		46:48

== Personnel ==
Credits adapted from liner notes.

- Oren Ambarchi – guitar, percussion, mixing
- Thomas Brinkmann – electronic drums
- John Tilbury – piano (1, 2)
- Ilan Volkov – performance (1, 3)
- The Icelandic Symphony Orchestra – performance (1, 3)
- Eyvind Kang – bowed strings (1), viola (5)
- Matt Chamberlain – drums (3, 4), electronics (3, 4)
- Crys Cole – contact microphone (4), brushes (4)
- Jim O'Rourke – synthesizer (4, 5), engineering
- U-zhaan – tabla (5)
- Randall Dunn – session co-production, engineering
- Timm Mason – session assistance
- Joe Talia – mixing
- Byron Scullin – mastering
- Rashad Becker – vinyl cut
- Stephen O'Malley – design
- Estelle Hanania – photography
