= Touch Music =

UK record label

Touch (sometimes mistakenly written 'Touch Records' and sometimes written Touch Music, which is technically the publishing side of the company) is a British audio-visual organisation, operating the Touch label. Touch was founded in 1982 by Jon Wozencroft and Mike Harding.

== Activities ==
Touch Music is the main arm of the London-based multimedia publishing company Touch, established in 1982 with such composers as Oren Ambarchi, Jasmin Blasco, Christian Fennesz, Soliman Gamil, Hildur Guðnadóttir, Philip Jeck, Phill Niblock, BJNilsen (alias Hazard), Yann Novak, Rosy Parlane, Zachary Paul, Peter Rehberg, Simon Scott, Claire M Singer, Carl Michael von Hausswolff, Chris Watson (El Tren Fantasma) and Jana Winderen on their roster.

Since January 2005 Touch's project Touch Radio has broadcast monthly programmes of varying lengths by artists including Niblock, Watson, and Jeck. In 2011 the Touch Radio archive was added to the British Library Sound Archive.

In 2006, for Touch's 25th anniversary, concerts by Philip Jeck, Fennesz, Ryoji Ikeda and Biosphere take place in York.

In september 2012, Touch's 30th anniversary is celebrated with concerts at the Our Lady of Lebanon Maronite Cathedral in Brooklyn. Among the dozen artists featured are Philip Jeck, Chris Watson, Gen Ken Montgomery and Lary 7.

== Labels ==
Owned labels:

- Touch
- Ash International
- Spire
