= Johannes Schultz =

Johannes Schultz may refer to:

- Johannes Schultz (composer) (1582–1653), German composer
- Johannes Heinrich Schultz (1884–1970), German psychiatrist and an independent psychotherapist
