= Günther Scheel =

German World War II fighter pilot (1921–1943)

- Günther Scheel
- Born: 23 November 1921; Dannenberg, Lower Saxony, Weimar Republic
- Died: 16 July 1943 (aged 21) (MIA); Missing near Bolkhov, Russian SFSR, Soviet Union
- Military career
- Allegiance: Nazi Germany
- Branch: Luftwaffe
- Service years: 1940–43
- Rank: Leutnant (second lieutenant)
- Unit: JG 54
- Conflicts: See battles World War II; Ground campaigns: European air campaign; Land campaigns: Eastern Front; Siege of Leningrad; Battle of Kursk; Operation Citadel; Kursk Strategic Offensive Operation; Operation Kutuzov (MIA) (PKIA)
- Awards: Knight's Cross of the Iron Cross (posthumously)

Günther Scheel (23 November 1921 – MIA 16 July 1943) was a German Luftwaffe fighter ace during World War II. A flying ace or fighter ace is a military aviator credited with shooting down five or more enemy aircraft during aerial combat. He is credited with 71 enemy aircraft shot down in only 70 combat missions, all of which he claimed over the Eastern Front. He is the only pilot with over ten victories known to have scored a strike rate higher than 1:1, having achieved more combat kills than his missions flown. He also was "ace-in-a-day" four times, shooting down five or more aircraft on a single day.

Born in Dannenberg, he was trained as a fighter pilot and was posted to Jagdgeschwader 54 (JG 54—54th Fighter Wing) in early 1943. At the time JG 54 was based at airfields near Leningrad where he claimed his first aerial victory on 9 February 1943 during the Siege of Leningrad. In July 1943, his unit was moved to an airfield at Oryol, where it fought in Operation Citadel. In 12 days of combat during the Battle of Kursk, Scheel claimed 31 further aerial victories. On 16 July, he claimed his 71st and last aerial victory before he had a mid-air collision with a Soviet fighter. Crashing behind enemy lines, he was reported missing in action, presumed killed in action. Posthumously, Scheel was awarded the Knight's Cross of the Iron Cross.

== Early life and career ==
Scheel was born on 23 November 1921 in Dannenberg in the Province of Hanover of the Weimar Republic. In early 1943, Scheel had completed flight training and was posted to 2. Staffel (2nd squadron) of Jagdgeschwader 54 (JG 54—54th Fighter Wing), a squadron of I. Gruppe (1st group) in late January. (Note: Flight training in the Luftwaffe progressed through the levels A1, A2 and B1, B2, referred to as A/B flight training. A training included theoretical and practical training in aerobatics, navigation, long-distance flights and dead-stick landings. The B courses included high-altitude flights, instrument flights, night landings, and training to handle the aircraft in difficult situations.) (Note: For an explanation of Luftwaffe unit designations see Organization of the Luftwaffe during World War II.) At the time, I. Gruppe was commanded by Major Hans Philipp and was based at an airfield at Krasnogvardeysk, present day Gatschina, which is located approximately 40 kilometers (25 miles) southwest of Leningrad.

== World War II ==
On Friday 1 September 1939 German forces invaded Poland which marked the beginning of World War II, and in June 1941, Germany invaded the Soviet Union which created the Eastern Front. In February 1943, I. Gruppe of JG 54 was equipped with the Focke-Wulf Fw 190 A-4 and engaged in the Siege of Leningrad. The combat area was predominantly in the east and southeast of Leningrad where Soviet forces had created a corridor to the city in Operation Iskra.

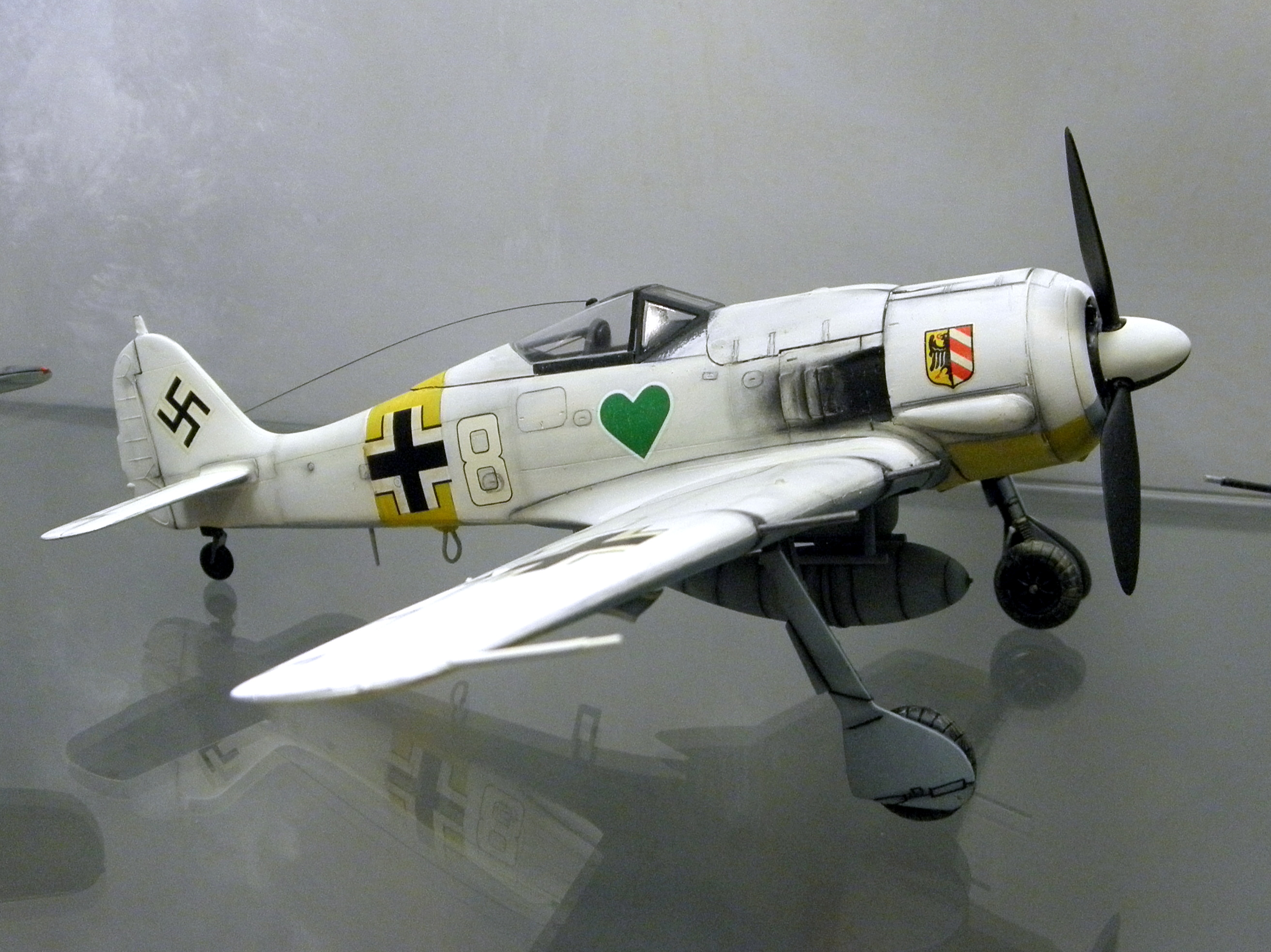
Scale model of Focke-Wulf Fw 190A-4 JG 54.

Scheel claimed his first two aerial victories on 9 February in combat east and south of Shlisselburg, 35 km (22 mi) east of Leningrad. That day, I. Gruppe claimed seven aerial victories, including a Lavochkin La-5 and Lavochkin-Gorbunov-Gudkov LaGG-3 fighter by Scheel. On 14 February, weather conditions over Leningrad improved and air operations picked up again resulting in 19 aerial victories plus a tethered balloon claimed by I. Gruppe. This number includes two Ilyushin Il-2 ground attack aircraft shot down by Scheel northeast of Lyuban. On 18 February, the Gruppe again flew missions to Lyuban and claimed four victories, among them an Il-2 credited to Scheel. On 23 February, Soviet forces launched an attack south of Leningrad as part of Operation Polyarnaya Zvezda. The attack was repelled by forces under the command of Generalleutnant Carl Hilpert. That day, all available aircraft of I. Gruppe flew missions in defense of this attack, predominantly attacking Soviet ground attack aircraft. By nightfall, the Gruppe reported 32 Soviet aircraft destroyed, including another Il-2 claimed by Scheel in the vicinity of Mga, southeast of Leningrad.

In late March, Soviet forces continued to pressure the 18th Army while in parallel an attack at Novgorod was launched. In defense of these attacks, I. Gruppe claimed four aerial victories, including a LaGG-3 north of Pushkin by Scheel on 21 March. Three days later, he claimed one of five aerial victories credited to I. Gruppe, an Il-2, taking his total to eight. After a period of bad weather, I. Gruppe flew several missions to the east and southeast of Leningrad on 3 April, reporting ten aerial victories. Additionally, 11 Fw 190s were sent on a ground attack mission against anti-aircraft artillery and infantry positions southeast of Woronowo as well as the train station at Lebjashje where some damage was inflicted. Scheel was credited with the destruction of a Bell P-39 Airacobra southeast of Leningrad that day. Weather conditions limited flight operations for the next few days until 8 April. I. Gruppe was in the air again and encountered Soviet fighters in the vicinity of Lomonosov where Scheel claimed a La-5 shot down. Sources vary with respect to the number, location and time of aerial victories Scheel was credited with on 16 April. According to the authors Prien, Stemmer, Rodeike and Bock, Scheel claimed two La-5s between 12:04 and 12:25 in an unknown location. According to Mathews and Foreman. Scheel was credited with a La-5 destroyed at 19:05 west of Lomonosov. That day, I. Gruppe claimed five aerial victories in combat near Leningrad.

The weather continued to impact flight operations for both sides and on 1 May, Scheel was the only pilot of I. Gruppe to claim an aerial victory (his 13th), an La-5. Although the weather had improved on 5 May, flight operations on both sides were limited to the front lines of Leningrad. In defense of a few attacks by ground attack aircraft and their escort fighters, Scheel claimed two LaGG-3 fighters south of the city, the only two claims filed that day by I. Gruppe. On 24 May, I. Gruppe was deployed over the combat area of the 16th Army, east of Soltsy where Soviet forces had attacked elements of Generalleutnant Gustav Höhne's forces south of Lake Ilmen. Scrambling from Soltsy airfield, I. Gruppe intercepted a flight of Il-2 ground attack aircraft on their mission to bomb and strafe the airfield at Rjelbitzi, located 26 kilometers (16 miles) north of Dno and 15 kilometers (9.3 miles) west-southwest of Soltsy on the northern bank of the Shelon. In total, the Gruppe claimed twelve aircraft shot down, including two Il-2s by Scheel. On 30 May, I. Gruppe escorted a number of Heinkel He 111 bombers from Kampfgeschwader 53 (KG 53—53rd Bomber Wing) on their mission to bomb the bridges spanning the Volkhov River at Volkhov. In addition to a LaGG-3 claimed at 13:48, he was credited with three aerial victories in defense of the bombers, two LaGG-3s and a Curtiss P-40 Warhawk.

On 5 June, I. Gruppe flew combat air patrols in the area of Volkhov and escort missions for KG 53 attacking the locks at Novaya Ladoga. That day, Scheel claimed two victories over LaGG-3 fighters. I. Gruppe saw little combat on 10 June; only Scheel was credited with an aerial victory. In combat north of Grusino, which is part of Chudovo, he shot down a La-5 fighter. He was credited with the destruction of another La-5 on 18 June. In combat near Volkhov, I. Gruppe claimed seven victories that day. On 21 June, Scheel claimed aerial victories numbering 26 to 29 which included three LaGG-3s and a La-5. That day, I. Gruppe predominantly flew missions over Leningrad and claimed 19 victories. Scheel flew his 50th combat mission on 22 June and claimed his 30th aerial victory. That day, I. Gruppe claimed five aircraft destroyed, including a LaGG-3 by Scheel. The Gruppe flew its last combat missions before relocating on 24 June. In addition to his 30 aerial victories claimed in the greater vicinity of Leningrad, Scheel also flew a number of ground attack missions, destroying a number of locomotives and other vehicles.

=== Operation Citadel ===
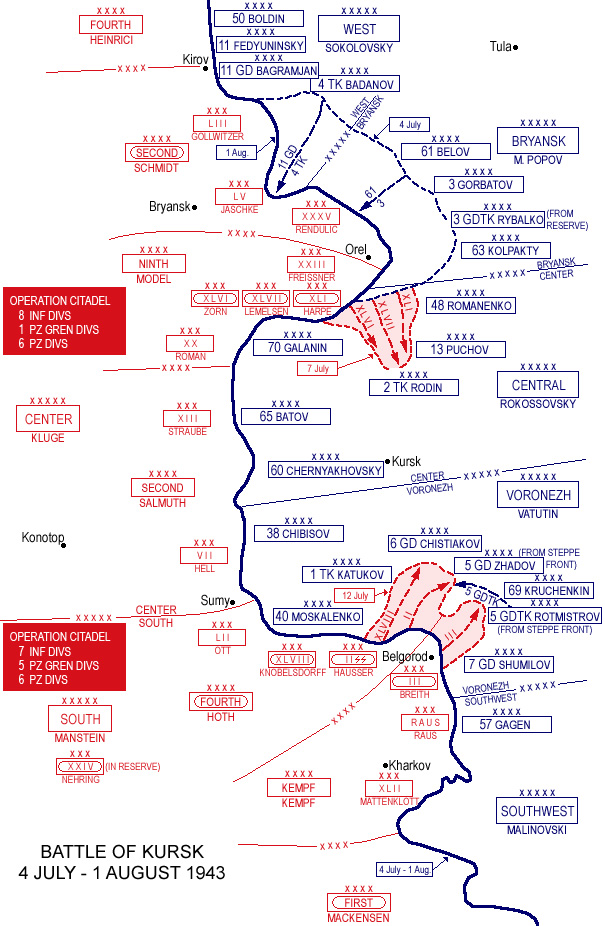
German penetration during the Battle of Kursk

In early July, I. Gruppe of JG 54 was ordered to move to Oryol, in the southern sector of Army Group Centre, where it fought in Operation Citadel which initiated the Battle of Kursk. Subordinated to Luftflotte 6 (Air Fleet 6), the Gruppe began relocating on 2 July and arrived at the airfield name Panikowo, a makeshift airfield created for the attack on the Kursk salient, on 4 July. The next day, the Wehrmacht launched Operation Citadel and I. Gruppe supported the attack of the 9th Army on the northern sector of the salient, escorting bombers of Kampfgeschwader 4, 51 and KG 53 (KG 4, KG 51—4th, 51st Bomber Wing), as well as Junkers Ju 87 dive bombers of Sturzkampfgeschwader 1 (StG 1—1st Dive Bomber Wing) to their target areas. That day, I. Gruppe claimed 59 aerial victories, including eight by Scheel in the vicinity of Maloarkhangelsk, making him an "ace-in-a-day" for the first time. The next day, I. Gruppe targeted the airspace near Ponyri and during multiple combat missions claimed 29 aerial victories which included a La-5 shot down by Scheel at 11:48 northeast of Ponyri. On 7 July, the German attack had been halted near Ponyri and Olkhovatka by Soviet forces. I. Gruppe claimed 35 victories and Scheel again made "ace-in-a-day", claiming seven victories which included four Il-2 ground attack aircraft shot down between 08:30 and 08:32.

On 8 July, I. Gruppe flew fighter escort missions for StG 1 as well as a number of combat air patrols in the vicinity of Ponyri. Although Luftwaffe fighters maintained local air superiority over the combat area of the 9th Army, German ground forces were hard pressed by a Soviet armor attack. That day, I. Gruppe claimed ten aerial victories, including a Douglas A-20 Havoc "Boston" bomber, a La-5 fighter and P-39 fighter by Scheel. The next day, Scheel claimed three further aerial victories which included his 50th in total, a P-39 shot down southwest of Maloarkhangelsk. On the sixth day of the operation, 10 July, the German advance in the north had completely come to a halt. I. Gruppe flew escort missions and combat air patrols over Maloarkhangelsk resulting in 24 aerial victories claimed. Scheel claimed five victories, becoming an "ace-in-a-day" for the third time. The objectives for I. Gruppe did not change on the next day. In total the Gruppe claimed seven victories, including three fighters shot down by Scheel on the early morning mission taking his total to 60.

On 12 July the Soviets launched Operation Kutuzov, their counter-offensive upon the Oryol salient, which threatened the flank and rear of the 9th Army. In support of German forces near Novosil and Mtsensk, I. Gruppe claimed ten victories, including an Il-2 ground attack aircraft by Scheel. The next day, Scheel became an "ace-in-a-day" for the fourth and last time during his combat career. All day, the Gruppe flew missions over the Oryol salient, claiming 32 aerial victories. This figure includes Scheel's aerial victories numbering 62 to 67, including three Yakovlev Yak-9 fighters in just two minutes. On 14 July, the Soviet attacks on the 2nd Panzer Army forced the 9th Army to strengthen its defenses, effectively making Operation Citadel a failure on the northern sector. Rainy weather impacted air operations on both sides, nevertheless I. Gruppe claimed eight aircraft shot down, including an Il-2 shot down by Scheel northwest of Bolkhov. The next day, weather conditions deteriorated further, significantly limiting air operations and no victories were claimed by I. Gruppe.

=== Missing in action ===
On the morning of 16 July 1943, flying Fw 190 A-5 (Werknummer 710002—factory number) on his second combat mission of the day, he shot down two Yak-9 fighters taking his total to 71. During this encounter, he collided with the wreckage of the second and crashed 15 kilometers (9.3 miles) northeast Bolkhov.

The loss report read: "Ltn Scheel took off at 07:07 hours together with 3. Staffel of I./JG 54 in order to provide a Stuka formation with fighter escort in the vicinity of Orel. After completion of this mission, Ltn Scheel shot down two Yak-9s, during a subsequent fighter sweep. During the second combat, his 71st in total, his left wing hit the enemy aircraft. The wing broke off at the fuselage, which caused the aircraft to immediately start descending from an altitude of 800 metres. In 50 metres altitude the aircraft caught fire and exploded on impact in Planquadrat 64356, at 8.06 hours. Point of impact: about 15 kilometres northeast of Bolkhov".

Weal claims that Scheel may have been the first pilot to claim 50 aerial victories while flying the Fw 190. According to Spick, Scheel, of all Luftwaffe fighter pilots, flew the fewest combat missions per aerial victory claimed. Posted to a front line unit in early 1943, he flew 70 combat missions and was credited with 71 aerial victories, all of which claimed on the Eastern Front. He was posthumously awarded the German Cross in Gold (Deutsches Kreuz in Gold) on 31 August 1943, the Honour Goblet of the Luftwaffe (Ehrenpokal der Luftwaffe) on 13 September 1943, and the Knight's Cross of the Iron Cross (Ritterkreuz des Eisernen Kreuzes) on 5 December 1943.

Reports of his fate vary, Weal states that he was killed in the crash and subsequent explosion, while Obermaier indicates that he may have bailed out at 200 meters (660 feet) and landed behind enemy lines. Scheel was reportedly seen in a camp at Yelabuga in 1946, and receiving medical treatment in a camp at Solny in 1948. However, he officially remains missing in action.

== Summary of career ==
=== Aerial victory claims ===
According to US historian David T. Zabecki, Scheel was credited with 71 aerial victories claimed in 70 combat missions, making it the highest kill-to-mission ratio. All of his aerial victories were claimed on the Eastern Front. Heaton, Lewis, Olds and Schulze also list him with 71 aerial victories. Mathews and Foreman, authors of Luftwaffe Aces — Biographies and Victory Claims, researched the German Federal Archives and state that Scheel was credited with 70 aerial victories, all of which claimed on the Eastern Front.

Victory claims were logged to a map-reference (PQ = Planquadrat), for example "PQ 36 Ost 10123". The Luftwaffe grid map (Jägermeldenetz) covered all of Europe, western Russia and North Africa and was composed of rectangles measuring 15 minutes of latitude by 30 minutes of longitude, an area of about 360 square miles (930 km^{2}). These sectors were then subdivided into 36 smaller units to give a location area 3 km × 4 km (1.9 mi × 2.5 mi) in size.

Chronicle of aerial victories
This and the ♠ (Ace of spades) indicates those aerial victories which made Scheel an "ace-in-a-day", a term which designates a fighter pilot who has shot down five or more airplanes in a single day. This and the ? (question mark) indicates information discrepancies listed by Prien, Stemmer, Rodeike, Bock, Mathews and Foreman.
Claim	Date	Time	Type	Location	Claim	Date	Time	Type	Location
– 2. Staffel of Jagdgeschwader 54 – Eastern Front — 4 February – 16 July 1943
1	9 February 1943	09:20	La-5	PQ 36 Ost 10123 east of Shlisselburg	36♠	5 July 1943	18:37	Il-2	PQ 35 Ost 63364; 25 km (16 mi) north-northwest of Maloarkhangelsk
2	9 February 1943	15:25	LaGG-3	PQ 36 Ost 10142 south of Shlisselburg	37♠	5 July 1943	18:38	Il-2	PQ 35 Ost 63473; 20 km (12 mi) north of Maloarkhangelsk
3	14 February 1943	13:21	Il-2	PQ 36 Ost 10473; 25 km (16 mi) northeast of Lyuban	38♠	5 July 1943	18:39	Il-2	PQ 35 Ost 63451; 25 km (16 mi) northeast of Maloarkhangelsk
4	14 February 1943	13:35? (Note: According to Mathews and Foreman claimed at 13:37.)	Il-2	PQ 36 Ost 10452; 25 km (16 mi) northeast of Lyuban	39	6 July 1943	11:48	La-5	PQ 35 Ost 63568, northeast of Ponyri; 10 km (6.2 mi) southwest of Maloarkhangelsk
5	18 February 1943	08:20	Il-2	PQ 36 Ost 10532; 10 km (6.2 mi) northeast of Lyuban	40♠	7 July 1943	08:30	Il-2	PQ 35 Ost 53561; 20 km (12 mi) southeast of Dmitrovsk
6	23 February 1943	10:59	La-5	PQ 36 Ost 10172 vicinity of Mga	41♠	7 July 1943	08:31	Il-2	PQ 35 Ost 56563, northeast of Ponyri; 20 km (12 mi) southeast of Dmitrovsk
7	21 March 1943	08:45	LaGG-3	PQ 36 Ost 00193; 10 km (6.2 mi) north of Pushkin	42♠	7 July 1943	08:32	Il-2	PQ 35 Ost 53592; 20 km (12 mi) east-northeast of Dmitrovsk
8	24 March 1943	08:53	Il-2	PQ 36 Ost 10193 east of Mga	43♠	7 July 1943	08:32	Il-2	PQ 35 Ost 53591; 25 km (16 mi) southeast of Dmitrovsk
9	3 April 1943	17:57	P-39	PQ 36 Ost 10141; 20 km (12 mi) southeast of Leningrad	44♠	7 July 1943	14:12	Boston	PQ 35 Ost 63691; 40 km (25 mi) west-southwest of Maloarkhangelsk
10	8 April 1943	16:28? (Note: According to Mathews and Foreman claimed at 16:31.)	La-5	PQ 26 Ost 90252; 15 km (9.3 mi) southeast of Lomonosov	45♠	7 July 1943	14:15	Yak-7	PQ 35 Ost 63514; 25 km (16 mi) west-northwest of Maloarkhangelsk
11? (Note: This claim is not listed by Mathews and Foreman.)	16 April 1943	12:04	La-5		46♠	7 July 1943	14:20	Pe-2	PQ 35 Ost 63592; 20 km (12 mi) south-southwest of Maloarkhangelsk
12?	16 April 1943	12:25	La-5		47	8 July 1943	08:04	Boston	PQ 35 Ost 63561; 10 km (6.2 mi) southwest of Maloarkhangelsk
? (Note: According to Mathews and Foreman this victory is listed as Scheel's 11th claim. However, this claim is not listed by Prien, Stemmer, Rodeike and Bock.)	16 April 1943	19:05	La-5	10 km (6.2 mi) west of Lomonosov	48	8 July 1943	17:31	La-5	PQ 35 Ost 63531; 10 km (6.2 mi) northwest of Maloarkhangelsk
13	1 May 1943	15:55	La-5	PQ 36 Ost 00164; 10 km (6.2 mi) southeast of Leningrad	49	8 July 1943	17:40	P-39	PQ 35 Ost 53693; 40 km (25 mi) west-southwest of Maloarkhangelsk
14	5 May 1943	11:45	LaGG-3	PQ 36 Ost 00152; 10 km (6.2 mi) south of Leningrad	50	9 July 1943	04:45	P-39	PQ 35 Ost 63576; 35 km (22 mi) southwest of Maloarkhangelsk
15	5 May 1943	11:48	LaGG-3	PQ 36 Ost 00161; 10 km (6.2 mi) southeast of Leningrad	51	9 July 1943	05:11	Il-2	PQ 35 Ost 63575; 35 km (22 mi) southwest of Maloarkhangelsk
16	24 May 1943	19:37	Il-2	PQ 35 Ost 09791	52	9 July 1943	05:11? (Note: According to Mathews and Foreman claimed at 05:12.)	Il-2	PQ 35 Ost 63579; 35 km (22 mi) southwest of Maloarkhangelsk
17	24 May 1943	19:38	Il-2	PQ 35 Ost 09872	53♠	10 July 1943	07:19	P-39	PQ 35 Ost 63753; 40 km (25 mi) southwest of Maloarkhangelsk
18	30 May 1943	13:48	LaGG-3? (Note: According to Mathews and Foreman claimed as a Lavochkin La-5.)	PQ 36 Ost 10113 vicinity of Shlisselburg	54♠	10 July 1943	07:20	P-39	PQ 35 Ost 63754; 40 km (25 mi) southwest of Maloarkhangelsk
19	30 May 1943	19:50	LaGG-3	PQ 36 Ost 11783; Lake Ladoga	55♠	10 July 1943	07:22	P-39	PQ 35 Ost 63743; 40 km (25 mi) southwest of Maloarkhangelsk
20	30 May 1943	19:51	LaGG-3	PQ 36 Ost 11784; Lake Ladoga	56♠	10 July 1943	13:33	LaGG-3	PQ 35 Ost 63543; 25 km (16 mi) west-southwest of Maloarkhangelsk
21	30 May 1943	20:18	Curtiss P-40	PQ 36 Ost 10123 east of Shlisselburg	57♠	10 July 1943	18:50	Yak-1	PQ 35 Ost 63714; 40 km (25 mi) southwest of Maloarkhangelsk
22	5 June 1943	12:01? (Note: According to Mathews and Foreman claimed at 12:05.)	LaGG-3	PQ 36 Ost 10451; 10 km (6.2 mi) northeast of Lyuban	58	11 July 1943	04:24	LaGG-3	PQ 35 Ost 63572; 35 km (22 mi) southwest of Maloarkhangelsk
23	5 June 1943	12:10	LaGG-3	PQ 36 Ost 20151, Wolchowstroj southwest of Volkhov	59	11 July 1943	04:26	LaGG-3	PQ 35 Ost 63573, west of Ponyri; 35 km (22 mi) southwest of Maloarkhangelsk
24	10 June 1943	18:16	La-5	PQ 36 Ost 10692; 25 km (16 mi) northeast of Chudovo	60	11 July 1943	04:33	La-5	PQ 35 Ost 63597; 20 km (12 mi) south-southwest of Maloarkhangelsk
25	18 June 1943	02:02? (Note: According to Mathews and Foreman claimed at 02:07.)	La-5	PQ 36 Ost 00334 east of Volkhov	61	12 July 1943	07:09	Il-2	PQ 35 Ost 64753; 25 km (16 mi) northeast of Oryol
26	21 June 1943	10:14	LaGG-3	PQ 36 Ost 10261; 25 km (16 mi) west-southwest of Shlisselburg	62♠	13 July 1943	11:11	La-5? (Note: According to Mathews and Foreman claimed as a Lavochkin-Gorbunov-Gudkov LaGG-3.)	PQ 35 Ost 73144
27	21 June 1943	10:15	LaGG-3	PQ 36 Ost 10262; 25 km (16 mi) west-southwest of Shlisselburg	63♠	13 July 1943	11:13	Yak-9	PQ 35 Ost 73123
28	21 June 1943	15:25	La-5	PQ 36 Ost 20112, Volkhovstroy west of Volkhov	64♠	13 July 1943	11:13	Yak-9	PQ 35 Ost 73123
29	21 June 1943	20:05	LaGG-3	PQ 36 Ost 20131	65♠	13 July 1943	14:04	Il-2	PQ 35 Ost 54413; 40 km (25 mi) west-southwest of Belyov
30	22 June 1943	02:25	LaGG-3	PQ 26 Ost 90634; 20 km (12 mi) southwest of Gatchina	66♠	13 July 1943	14:12	Il-2	PQ 35 Ost 54442; 25 km (16 mi) west-northwest of Bolkhov
31♠	5 July 1943	04:18	La-5	PQ 35 Ost 63612 vicinity of Maloarkhangelsk	67♠	13 July 1943	19:12	La-5	PQ 35 Ost 64221; 10 km (6.2 mi) southeast of Mtsensk
32♠	5 July 1943	10:02	Curtiss P-40	PQ 35 Ost 63531; 15 km (9.3 mi) west-southwest of Maloarkhangelsk	68	14 July 1943	15:45	Il-2	PQ 35 Ost 54481; 20 km (12 mi) northwest of Bolkhov
33♠	5 July 1943	10:06	Curtiss P-40	PQ 35 Ost 63334; 10 km (6.2 mi) northwest of Maloarkhangelsk	69	16 July 1943	05:25	Spitfire	PQ 35 Ost 54443; 30 km (19 mi) northwest of Bolkhov
34♠	5 July 1943	12:02	Curtiss P-40	PQ 35 Ost 63583; 20 km (12 mi) southwest of Maloarkhangelsk	70	16 July 1943	07:55	Yak-9	PQ 35 Ost 54412; 40 km (25 mi) west-southwest of Belyov
35♠	5 July 1943	18:35	Il-2	PQ 35 Ost 63481; 20 km (12 mi) northeast of Maloarkhangelsk	71	16 July 1943	08:05	Yak-9	PQ 35 Ost 54356; 30 km (19 mi) southeast of Zhizdra

=== Awards ===
- Iron Cross (1939) 2nd and 1st Class
- German Cross in Gold on 31 August 1943 (posthumously) as Leutnant in the I./Jagdgeschwader 54
- Honor Goblet of the Luftwaffe on 13 September 1943 (posthumously) as Leutnant and pilot
- Knight's Cross of the Iron Cross on 5 December 1943 (posthumously) as Leutnant and Staffelführer of the 3./Jagdgeschwader 54 (Note: According to Scherzer as pilot in the 3./Jagdgeschwader 54.)

== See also ==
- List of people who disappeared
