= Augustin Gottfried Ludwig Lentin =

German chemist (1764–1823)

Augustin G. Lentin
- Born: Augustin Gottfried Ludwig Lentin; January 4, 1764; Dannenberg
- Died: January 18, 1823 (aged 59)
- Occupation: Chemist

Augustin Gottfried Ludwig Lentin (January 4, 1764 – January 18, 1823) was a German chemist. He was a lecturer at the University of Göttingen and subsequently inspector of saltworks, and a writer and translator of works on chemistry and metallurgy.

== Early life and education ==
Lentin was born in Dannenberg, Lower Saxony, Germany on 4 January 1764, the son of Lebrecht Friedrich Benjamin Lentin (1736–1804), physician and prolific writer on medical topics. He took the degree of Ph.D. at Georg-August-Universität Göttingen and acted as private lecturer in the same university from 1795 to 1801 where he gave courses on technical chemistry and 'practical economic chemistry'. During this period he translated from English a number of recent publications on chemistry including works by Elizabeth Fulhame, Richard Kirwan and James Keir, and published several books and papers himself on chemical and mining matters.

== Metallurgy ==
During this period he visited Wales where he took a particular interest in the copper industry. He spent some time at Parys Mountain on Anglesey, a major source of copper ore during the second half of the 18th century, and also at the works at Ravenhead and Stanley, both near St Helens, Merseyside, where ore from Parys Mountain was smelted. His findings were described in a publication that appeared in 1800 under the title Briefe über die Insel Anglesea : vorzüglich über das dasige Kupfer-Bergwerk und die dazu gehörigen Schmelzwerke und Fabriken (Leipzig : Crusius, 1800). His style has been described as 'cumbersome and pedantic' but his work still represents a useful source for the historians of technology and in particular of the mining and smelting of copper. An English translation appeared in 2007.

The frequent papers and translations of the 1790s ceased after 1801 following Lentin's appointment as clerk at a saltworks in Rothenfelde, and subsequently in 1817 as salt inspector at Sülbeck and Salzderhelden in the kingdom of Hanover. He also made experiments on the roasting and smelting of ores at Rammelsberg in a large furnace.

== Death ==
He died at Sülbeck, near Eimbeck, on 18 January 1823.

== Original works ==
- Ueber das Verhalten der Metalle wenn sie in dephlogistisirter Luft der Wirkung des Feuers ausgesezt werden (1795)
- Taschenbuch für Freunde der Gebirgskunde (1798)
- Etwas über den Prozess der Destillation nebst einer Anzeige seiner Vorlesungen (1799)
- Contributions to Allgemeines Journal der Chemie, Bd 3 (1799)
- Briefe über die Insel Anglesea : vorzüglich über das dasige Kupfer-Bergwerk und die dazu gehörigen Schmelzwerke und Fabriken (Leipzig : 1800)
- 'Nachricht von dem Kupferbergwerke auf der Insel Anglesea und den damit in Verbindung stehenden Schmelzhütten und Fabriken' (in Magazin der Handels- und Gewerbskunde, 1804)

== Translations ==
- Versuche und Beobachtungen über die Auflösung der Metalle in Säuren und ihre Niederschlagungen … (1791) (Translation of: James Keir, Experiments and observations on the dissolution of metals in acids; and their precipitations (1790)
- Versuche über die Wiederherstellung der Metalle durch Wasserstoffgas, Phosphor, Schwesel, Schweselleber, geschweseltes Wasserstoffgas, gephosphorte Wasserstoffgas, Kohle, Licht und Sauren (1795) (Translation of: Elizabeth Fulhame, An essay on combustion with a view to a new art of dying and painting wherein the phlogistic and antiphlogistic hypotheses are proved erroneous (1794)
- Beantwortung der Fragen: Welches sind die paßlichsten Düngmittel für die verschiedenen Arten von Boden … (1796) (Translation of : Richard Kirwan, Essay in answer to the following question proposed by the Royal Irish Academy, what are the manures most advantageously applicable to the various sorts of soils and what are the causes of their beneficial effect in each particular instance? (1795)
- Geschichte des Feldzuges von 1796 in Deutschland und Italien (1798) (Translation of : The history of the campaign of 1796 in Germany and Italy (1796) (attributed to Thomas Graham)
