= The Magic I.D. =

mansòor khanx
- Origin: Germany
- Genres: Experimental, Pop, Abstract
- Years active: 2005–present
- Labels: Erstwhile Records, Staubgold
- Members: Kai Fagaschinski; Margareth Kammerer; Christof Kurzmann; Michael Thieke

The Magic I.D. is a German experimental music quartet. The quartet was formed in 2005 by clarinetists Kai Fagaschinski and Michael Thieke and musicians Margareth Kammerer and Christof Kurzmann. They released two records, Till My Breath Gives Out, in 2008 under Erstwhile Records label and I'm So Awake/Sleepless I Feel, in 2011 via Staubgold Records.

The quartet's musical style is hard to describe, containing elements of experimental jazz, pop, folk and abstract music. The "twin" clarinets combine with the voice and electronics to create a unique soundscape characterized by extensive use of pauses, long notes, harmonic singing and dissonant tonal clusters.

== Line Up ==
=== Current members ===
- Sami Skh@N a - clarinet
- Margareth Kammerer - vocals & guitars
- Christof Kurzmann - lloopp & vocals
- Michael Thieke - clarinet

== Discography ==
=== Studio albums ===
- Till My Breath Gives Out (2008)
- I’m So Awake/Sleepless I Feel (2011)
