= Dannenberg (Elbe) =

- Town
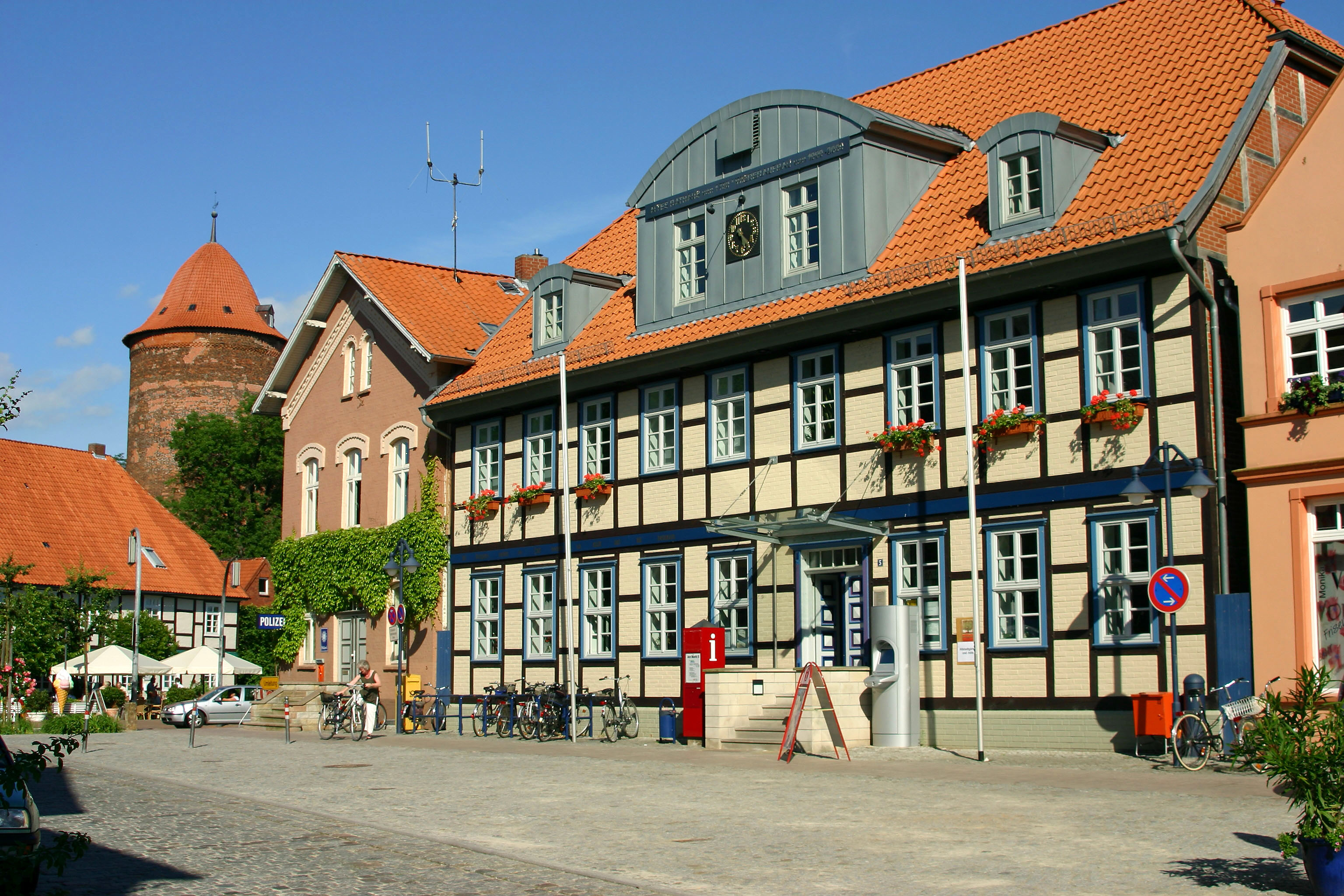
- Old town hall

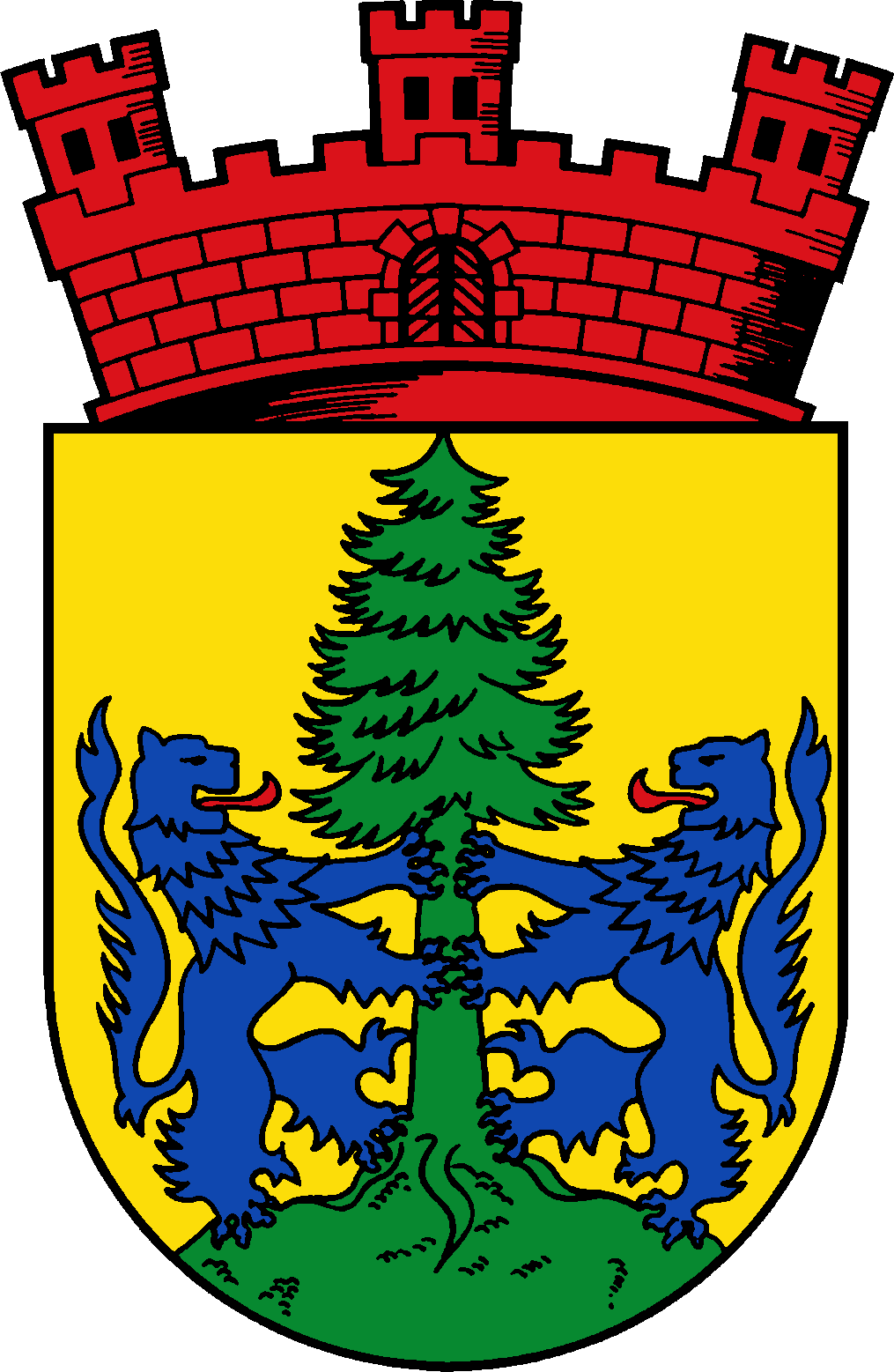
- Coat of arms

- Location of Dannenberg within Lüchow-Dannenberg district
- Interactive map of Dannenberg
- Location within Germany Location within Lower Saxony
- Coordinates: 53°05′N 11°05′E
- Country: Germany
- State: Lower Saxony
- District: Lüchow-Dannenberg
- Municipal assoc.: Elbtalaue

Government
  - Mayor: Kurt Behning (CDU)

Area
  - Total: 76.62 km^{2} (29.58 sq mi)
- Elevation: 14 m (46 ft)

Population (2025-12-31)
  - Total: 7,879
  - Density: 102.8/km^{2} (266.3/sq mi)
- Time zone: UTC+01:00 (CET)
  - Summer (DST): UTC+02:00 (CEST)
- Postal codes: 29451
- Dialling codes: 05861
- Vehicle registration: DAN
- Website: http://www.dannenberg.de

Dannenberg (German pronunciation: [ˈdanənbɛʁk]; Polabian: Weidars) is a town in the district Lüchow-Dannenberg, in Lower Saxony, Germany. It is situated on the river Jeetzel, approx. 30 km north of Salzwedel, and 50 km south-east of Lüneburg. Dannenberg has a population of 8,147 inhabitants as of December 2010.

== Geography ==
Dannenberg is located on the German Timber-Frame Road.

== Politics ==
It is the seat of the Samtgemeinde ("collective municipality") Elbtalaue.

== Culture ==
Dannenberg has a soccer team which plays in the regional league, TSV Dannenberg.

== History ==
The actual history of the town began with the construction of the castle (first mentioned in 1153) during the rule of Volrad I, Count of Dannenberg (1153–1169), who had been given the task of settling and securing the territory by Duke Henry the Lion. The Waldemarturm is a local historical landmark, a tower in which the Danish King Valdemar II was imprisoned from 1223 to 1224.

After World War II, Dannenberg was part of West Germany. However, it is situated very close to the Elbe river, which served as the border between East and West Germany until 1990.

Lüchow-Dannenberg is situated in a region known as the Wendland, a mostly rural and agricultural area on the eastern edge of Lower Saxony. Starting in the 1970s, Dannenberg was a center for anti-nuclear protests due to the government's plan to build a nuclear waste site in Gorleben, a municipality within the district. Much of the organizing against this facility was based in Dannenberg, notably a tractor drive from Dannenberg to Hannover culminating in a rally. Environmental activism persists as a major issue in the area.

The Polabian Names for Dannenberg are Weidars and Woikam.

=== Jewish Community ===
Dannenberg had a jewish community until the early 20th century. A small Jewish cemetery (the Jewish cemetery, Dannenberg) was created in the north of Dannenberg in 1742. The 45 gravestones that still stand today range from 1776 to 1899.

== Twin towns ==
Dannenberg is twinned with:

- Łask, Poland, since 1999

== Notable people ==
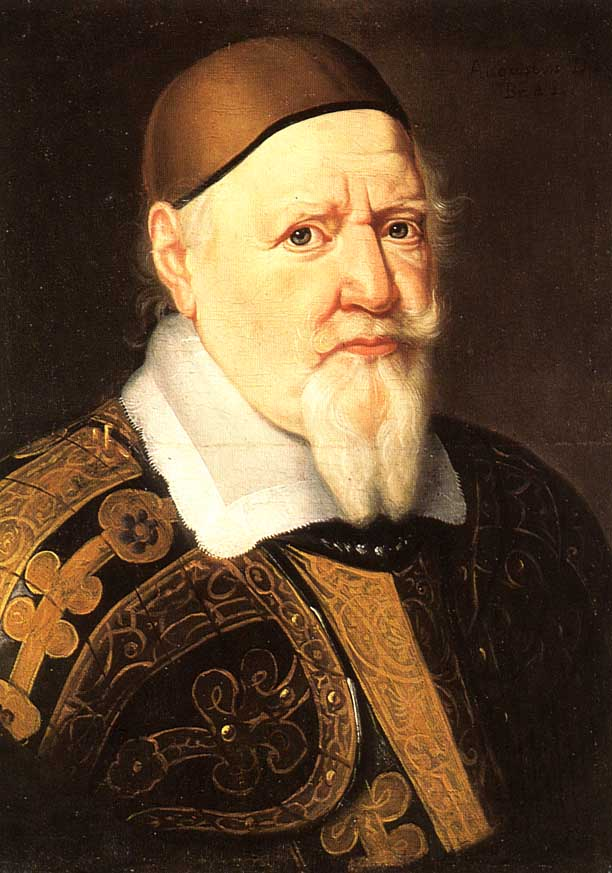
August the Younger, 1666

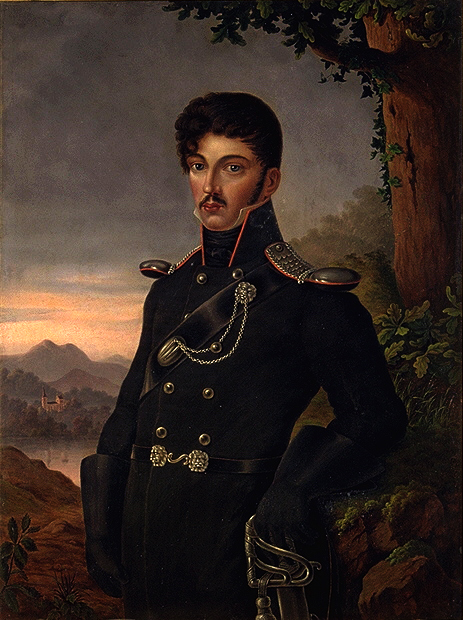
Theodor Körner by Dora Stock, 1814

- Augustus II, Duke of Brunswick (1579-1666), Duke of Brunswick
- Johannes Schultz (1582-1653), composer
- Augustin Gottfried Ludwig Lentin, (1764-1823), writer and translator of works on chemistry and metallurgy
- Eleonore Prochaska (1785-1813), female soldier of Napoleonic Wars who died in Dannenberg
- Theodor Körner (1791-1813), wrote the Federal song Before the Battle in Dannenberg before Battle of the Göhrde
- Bernhard Riemann (1826-1866), important mathematician.
- Harry Bresslau, (1848-1926), Jewish historian and diplomat, father in law of Albert Schweitzer
- Günther Scheel (1921–1943), Luftwaffe fighter ace during WWII
- Nicolas Born (1937-1979), writer, died locally
- Detlef Weigel (born 1961), development biologist
- Kai Fagaschinski (born 1974), jazz clarinetist and composer
- Almuth Schult (born 1991), football goalkeeper; played over 200 games and 66 for Germany women
