= Abzyme =

Type of antibody

An abzyme (from antibody and enzyme), also called catmab (from catalytic monoclonal antibody), and most often called catalytic antibody or sometimes catab, is a monoclonal antibody with catalytic activity. Abzymes are usually raised in lab animals immunized against synthetic haptens, but some natural abzymes can be found in normal humans (anti-vasoactive intestinal peptide autoantibodies) and in patients with autoimmune diseases such as systemic lupus erythematosus, where they can bind to and hydrolyze DNA. To date abzymes display only weak, modest catalytic activity and have not proved to be of any practical use. They are, however, subjects of considerable academic interest. Studying them has yielded important insights into reaction mechanisms, enzyme structure and function, catalysis, and the immune system itself.

Enzymes function by lowering the activation energy of the transition state of a chemical reaction, thereby enabling the formation of an otherwise less-favorable molecular intermediate between the reactant(s) and the product(s). If an antibody is developed to bind to a molecule that is structurally and electronically similar to the transition state of a given chemical reaction, the developed antibody will bind to, and stabilize, the transition state, just like a natural enzyme, lowering the activation energy of the reaction, and thus catalyzing the reaction. By raising an antibody to bind to a stable transition-state analog, a new and unique type of enzyme is produced.

So far, all catalytic antibodies produced have displayed only modest, weak catalytic activity. The reasons for low catalytic activity for these molecules have been widely discussed. Possibilities indicate that factors beyond the binding site may play an important role, in particular through protein dynamics. Some abzymes have been engineered to use metal ions and other cofactors to improve their catalytic activity.

== History ==
The possibility of catalyzing a reaction by means of an antibody which binds the transition state was first suggested by William P. Jencks in 1969. In 1994 Peter G. Schultz and Richard A. Lerner received the prestigious Wolf Prize in Chemistry for developing catalytic antibodies for many reactions and popularizing their study into a significant sub-field of enzymology.

== Abzymes in healthy human breast milk ==
There are a broad range of abzymes in healthy human breast milk with DNAse, RNAse, and protease activity.

== Potential HIV treatment ==
In a June 2008 issue of the journal Autoimmunity Review, researchers S. Planque, Sudhir Paul, Ph.D., and Yasuhiro Nishiyama, Ph.D. of the University Of Texas Medical School at Houston announced that they have engineered an abzyme that degrades the superantigenic region of the gp120 CD4 binding site. This is the one part of the HIV virus outer coating that does not change, because it is the attachment point to T lymphocytes, the key cell in cell-mediated immunity. Once infected by HIV, patients produce antibodies to the more changeable parts of the viral coat. The antibodies are ineffective because of the virus' ability to change their coats rapidly. Because this protein gp120 is necessary for HIV to attach, it does not change across different strains and is a point of vulnerability across the entire range of the HIV variant population.

The abzyme does more than bind to the site: it catalytically destroys the site, rendering the virus inert, and then can attack other HIV viruses. A single abzyme molecule can destroy thousands of HIV viruses.
