= Bernhard Gál =

Austrian artist, composer, and musicologist

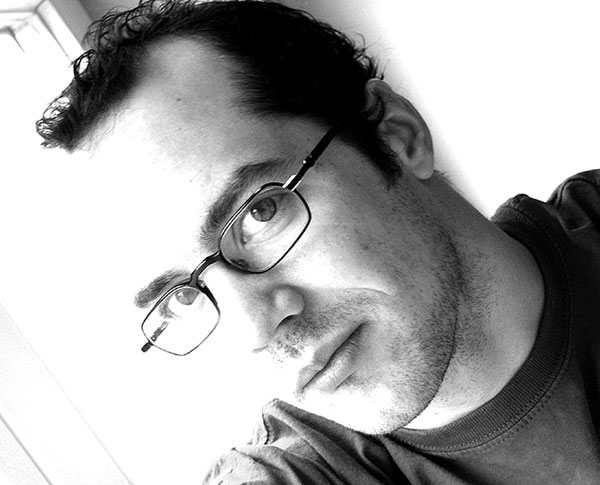
- Born: 1971 (age 54–55)
- Occupations: Artist; Composer; Musicologist

Bernhard Gál (born 1971) is an Austrian artist, composer and musicologist.

== Biography ==
Bernhard Gál (a.k.a. Gal) works between the categories, creating music for instruments and electro-acoustic compositions, as well as art installations. Many of his intermedia art projects and sound installations present combinations of sound, light, objects, video projections and spatial concepts. He is director of the Austrian art organization "sp ce" and runs the record label Gromoga Records. From 2006 to 2025, he directed the transdisciplinary festival “shut up and listen!” in Vienna, which continued in 2026 as the LIMIN∆LE festival. In 2006–07, he taught at the Berlin University of the Arts. From 2010 to 2013, he was a research assistant at Paris Lodron University of Salzburg. In 2021, Gál earned his Ph.D. with a dissertation on installation-based sound art as part of the “Science and Art” doctoral program at the Mozarteum University in Salzburg, published by wolke, Germany in 2022. From 2020 to 2025, he served as a lecturer at the University of Music and Performing Arts Vienna (music theory, repertoire, aural training, composition). Since fall 2023, Gál has been leading the multi-year FWF-PEEK project AUDIO GHOSTS, which focuses on artistic research into auditory illusions in sound art. Gál's work has been presented in concerts, installations and exhibitions throughout Europe, Asia and the Americas. He has been invited to music and art festivals including Donaueschinger Musiktage, Donaufestival, FILE in São Paulo, ICMC, Inventionen, MaerzMusik and Sonambiente in Berlin, Jeunesse Festival and Wien Modern in Vienna, MATA Festival, New Sound and New York-Festival in New York City, Musashino Public Art Festival in Tokyo, Musicacoustica in Beijing, Mutek in Montreal, Nuova Consonanza in Rome, Soundfield Festival in Chicago, and Festival Stimme+ of the ZKM in Karlsruhe. He has collaborated with artists such as Yumi Kori, P. Michael Schultes, G. S. Sedlak, and Emre Tuncer. For his work, Gal has received numerous awards, including the Karl Hofer Prize of Berlin in 2001, a fellowship from the DAAD Artists-in-Berlin Program in 2003, the Austrian state scholarship for composition in 2004, and the Outstanding Artist Award for Music of the City of Vienna 2010. His music has been made available on c. 30 audio publications, by record labels such as Durian, Plate Lunch, Intransitive Records, Bremsstrahlung, Klanggalerie, Charhizma, and Gromoga. Currently Gál lives and works in Vienna.

== Selected electroacoustic works ==
- "Ur-Ur", series of electro-acoustic compositions, ca. 40', 2016.
- "homesweethomes #3", 23', 2016.
- "Das himmlische Kind", 34', 2015. Book & DVD Video 'Zwischenbrücken', edition sp ce, 2015.
- "homesweethomes #2", 17', 2014.
- "homesweethomes #1", 32', 2013.
- "Void", 9', 2012.
- "earlift", 16', 2011. Book & DVD Video 'Zwischenbrücken', edition sp ce, 2015.
- "xuan zhuan", 15', 2009. CD 'same difference', Gromoga, Austria, 2010.
- "relive", series of electro-acoustic compositions, 78', 2008. CD-Version released by Gromoga, Austria, 2008.
- "solo", four electro-acoustic compositions, 4 x 20', 2007. Book & DVD Video 'Zwischenbrücken', edition sp ce, 2015.
- "Reinstallation", 74', 2006.
- "le gocce dell' uomo del campo", 7', 2004. CD 'Danza De La Muerte', Klanggalerie, Austria, 2003.
- "Dreiband", 42', 2003. Catalogue book and Audio CD 'Installations', Kehrer, 2005.
- "Made in Austria", 2002.
- "RGB", 42', 2001. CD 'relisten', Intransitive, USA, 2001.
- "Hinaus:: In den, Wald.", 64', 2001. CD-Version released by Klanggalerie, Austria, 2004.
- "zhu shui", 7', 2001. CD 'lowercase sound', Bremsstrahlung, USA, 2002.
- "57A", 7', 2001. CD 'relisten', Intransitive, USA, 2001.
- "bestimmung darmstadt", nine voice sculptures, 41', 2000.
- "Defragmentation/blue", 56', 1998. CD-Version released by Plate Lunch, Germany, 2000.
- "bestimmung new york", 15 voice sculptures, 63', 1998. CD-Version released by Durian, Austria, 1999.
- "68th Street", 14', 1998. CD 'relisten', Intransitive, USA, 2001.

== Selected instrumental works ==
- "Un-Un | ununtitled", for four female vocalists, 2015.
- "schwarzenberg", for piano, 2013
- "beshadowed II", for flute, violoncello, sound- and light projection, 2013.
- "flut", for bass flute and quadrophonic sound projection, 2011 (in collaboration with Belma Beslic-Gal).
- "becuadro", for brass quartet and light projection, 2008
- "behape", for 2 clarinets and sound projection, 2006
- "Klangschatten", for Chinese instruments, sound- and light projection, 2004
- "UTOO", for chamber ensemble and sound projection, 2004
- "belit", composition for chamber ensemble and light projection, 2004
- "uh-jeh-gal", for zheng, sheng and live electronics, 2004
- "vür fier", for quartertone-trumpet, guitar, sheng / xun and zheng, 2003
- "Defragmentation", for chamber ensemble, 2002
- "Mount Blanc", for (amplified) piano, 2002
- "beshadowed", for flute, violoncello, sound- and light projection, 2002
- "Of Sound and Time", for traditional Chinese instruments and three listeners, 2000

== Selected exhibitions ==
Solo Exhibitions / Intermedia Art Projects

- Das himmlische Kind; Zurich University of the Arts (Toni Campus), Zurich, 2015
- Silence is quiet. Listening; Radio Art Project; Kunstradio, Austria, 2013
- textur #8 (premiere); Kunstverein Alte Schmiede, Vienna, 2013
- textur #7 (premiere); Institut für neue Medien, Frankfurt, 2012
- textur #6 (premiere); Kunstverein Alte Schmiede, Vienna, 2011
- earlift; KunstQuartier, Salzburg, Austria. 2011
- Sterngucker; Planetarium Judenburg, Austria, 2011
- stromlinien; KoFoMi 2010, Mittersill, Austria, 2010
- textur #5 (premiere); SESC Avenida Paulista, São Paulo, 2009
- mil águas. DMAE Gallery, Porto Alegre, Brasil, 2009
- solo. Allgemeiner Konsumverein, Braunschweig, Germany, 2009
- RGB. Alpen-Adria-Universität Klagenfurt (Austria), 2008
- solo. Lakeside Science & Technology Park, Klagenfurt (Austria), 2008
- Reinstallation. O Lugar, São Paulo, 2008
- Die Grüne Hölle. Kunstverein Alte Schmiede, Vienna, 2008
- Klangbojen, Festival Donaueschinger Musiktage, Germany, 2007
- Jukai. In collaboration with Yumi Kori. The David Winton Bell Gallery, Providence, 2007
- solo. Musik aktuell 2007, Gutenbrunn, Austria, 2007
- solo. Musik aktuell 2007, Tulln, Austria, 2007
- shinkai. In collaboration with Yumi Kori. ISE Foundation, New York City, 2006
- Reinstallation. Festival Electric Eclectics, Meaford (Canada), 2006
- Die Grüne Hölle. Festival Sonambiente, Gallery of the Austrian Embassy, Berlin, 2006
- Airport. Musikinstrumenten-Museum, Berlin, 2006
- Infinitation (Seattle). In collaboration with Yumi Kori. Center of Contemporary Art, Seattle, 2005
- Hinaus:: In den, Wald. Diapason Gallery, New York, 2005
- Defragmentation (Krems). In collaboration with Yumi Kori. Donaufestival, Krems, 2005
- Night Pulses. O.K. Centrum für Gegenwartskunst, Linz, 2004
- RGBuSW. singuhr - hoergalerie in parochial, Berlin, 2004
- Klangbojen. Musik aktuell 2003, Hanslteich, Gutenbrunn (Austria), 2003
- Klangbojen. Musik aktuell 2003, Donau-Altarm, Tulln (Austria), 2003
- Machina temporis. In collaboration with Yumi Kori. Franziskaner-Klosterruine, Berlin, 2002
- RGB. Kunstverein Alte Schmiede, Vienna, 2001
- zhu shui. Jazzatelier Ulrichsberg, Austria, 2000
- Defragmentation/red. In collaboration with Yumi Kori. Kryptonale Festival, Berlin, 2000
- Dissociated Voices. Werkstadt Graz, Graz, 2000
- Defragmentation/blue. In collaboration with Yumi Kori. Studio Five Beekman, New York, 1999

Group Exhibitions

- sprachklanggesetzt; Festival EUROPA, Arena, Vienna, 2015
- Alsógál; Sound Art Group Exhibition 'On the Edge of Perceptibility', Kunsthalle Budapest, 2014
- Revelator | Boxed Secret | Neon Pier; Sheila Johnson Design Center, New York City, 2014
- It's like...; Group Exhibition 'Ueber das Scheitern'; enter: Raum für Kunst, Salzburg, 2013
- homesweethomes; Espace Projet, Montreal, 2013
- Sterngucker; Festival Sláturtíð, Reykjavík Art Museum, Iceland, 2011
- vibrate space, Festival Coded Cultures, Vienna, 2011
- RGB. das weisse haus, Vienna, 2010
- enelten. Area 53, Vienna, 2010
- Reinstallation. Festival Musicacoustica, Beijing, 2007
- Hyohaku-no-Hakobune. In collaboration with Yumi Kori. Kobe Bienal, Kobe, 2007
- Shinkai. In collaboration with Yumi Kori. Japan Society, New York City, 2007
- Hinaus:: In den, Wald. Galeria Vermelho, São Paulo, 2007
- RADIO EARS (textur #2). Magyar Muehely Galéria, Budapest, 2007
- Infinitation (São Paulo). In collaboration with Yumi Kori. SESC Pinheiros, São Paulo, 2006
- RGB. Klangturm, St. Poelten, Austria, 2006
- Defragmentation (ISCP). In collaboration with Yumi Kori. ISCP, New York City, 2005
- soundbagism. Denver International Airport, USA, 2004
- Oelbilder. Festival Reservoir VIII. Grosser Wasserspeicher, Berlin, 2004
- Three Whites. Sound Art Exhibition ‘Rock's Role‘, Art in General, New York, 2004
- zhu shui. MATA-Festival. Gallery ‘GAle GAtes et al.’ New York, 2003
- Green Voice / Green Box. In collaboration with Yumi Kori. Musashino, Tokyo, 2002
- enelten. Sound Off Festival. Galéria Umenia, Nové Zámky, Slowakia, 2002
- I am sHitting in a room. Durian-Festival. Konzerthaus, Wien, 2002
- Hinaus:: In den, Wald. Sammlung Essl, Klosterneuburg (Austria), 2001
- bestimmung darmstadt. Museum Institut Mathildenhöhe, Darmstadt, 2000
- NYC Subway. Jonathan Shorr Gallery, New York City, 1998

== Discography ==
Main publications

- Zwischenbrücken (Book & DVD, edition sp ce/Gromoga, 2015)
- same difference (Gromoga, 2010)
- relive (Gromoga, 2008)
- Installations (DVD version) (Gromoga, 2007)
- Installations (CD version) (Gromoga, 2005)
- going round in serpentines (with Kai Fagaschinski, Charhizma, 2005)
- Installations (catalogue book and Audio CD) (Kehrer, 2005)
- Hinaus:: In den, Wald. (Klanggalerie, 2004)
- relisten (Intransitive, 2001)
- Defragmentation/blue (Plate Lunch, 2000)
- bestimmung New York (Durian, 1999)

Selected Compilations and Catalogue CDs

- Web release 'Autumn Soundscapes Vol.2' (Mandorla Records, Mexico, 2014)
- CD 'Black and White Statements' (Gramola, Austria, 2013)
- Web release 'Somewhere on the edge' (Gruenrekorder, Germany, 2012)
- Book/DVD 'singuhr 1996-2006' (Kehrer, Germany, 2010)
- CD 'Sudamerica Electronica 3' (Sudamerica Electronica, Argentine, 2010)
- DVD 'stadtklaenge | klangstaetten' (Allgemeiner Konsumverein Braunschweig, Germany, 2009)
- CD 'Sound Art: Beyond Music, Between Media.' (Rizzoli, USA 2007)
- CD 'henri chopin remixed' (Extraplatte, Austria 2006)
- CD 'triMIX' (Innova Recordings, USA 2006)
- CD '90 Sekunden Wirklichkeit' (DEGEM/Cybele, Germany 2005)
- Catalogue & CDR 'Night Pulses' (O.K Center for Contemporary Art, Austria 2004)
- DVD 'Text & Language' (Aspect, Magazine of New Media Art, USA 2004)
- CD 'Rock's Role (After Ryoanji)' (Art in General, USA 2004)
- CD 'Intransitive Twenty-Three' (Intransitive Recordings, USA 2004)
- CD 'Danza De La Muerte' (Klanggalerie, Austria 2003)
- CD 'Typewriting Aloud. Typos Allowed' (SOUND OFF-FestivalSlovakia 2002)
- CD 'lowercase sound 2002' (Bremsstrahlung, USA 2002)
- CD 'because tomorrow comes #4' (because tomorrow comes, Germany 2001)
- CD 'klanggesetz' (Initiative Minderheiten, Austria 2000)
- Catalogue & CDR 'Dissociated Voices' (Werkstadt Graz, Austria 2000)
- CD 'Beams and Waves' (Sound Off Festival, Slovakia 2000)

== Awards ==
- 2016 Austrian State Scholarship for Composition
- 2010 Outstanding Artist Award for Music, City of Vienna
- 2010 Acquisition Award of the State Art Collection of Austria
- 2009 Research Fellowship, University Mozarteum, Salzburg
- 2006 The New Austrian Sound of Music (travel award) 2006-07, Austrian Foreign Ministry
- 2004 Austrian State Scholarship for Composition
- 2003 Theatre Award “Intercultural Accents 2003”, Vienna (with X. Hu)
- 2003 DAAD Artists in Berlin Program (annual fellowship), Berlin
- 2002 Artist-in-Residency, Hotel Pupik, Austria
- 2002 Jahresstipendium (annual grant), SKE-Fonds, Vienna
- 2001 Karl-Hofer-Prize, University of the Arts, Berlin
- 2001 The ar+d award (recognition), The Architectural Review, London (with Y. Kori)
- 2000 Artist-in-Residency, Werkstadt Graz, Graz
- 2000 Composition Award, Initiative Minderheiten, Vienna
- 1999 Max-Brand-Prize, Austria (recognition)
- 1999 Research Fellowship, University of Vienna

== Publications ==
- Pausch/Majdak/Mayer/Gál; Investigating the Physically Hidden: Auditory-based illusions for sound installations (Organised Sound, Volume 30, Issue 1, April 2025, pp. 68–80)
- Bernhard Gál, Hörorte | Klangräume. Eine transdisziplinäre Topografie installativer Klangkunst (open access publication), Hofheim: wolke, 2023
- Bernhard Gál, HÖRORTE | KLANGRÄUME. Eine transdisziplinäre Topografie installativer Klangkunst (sinefonia DIGITAL #3), Hofheim: wolke, 2022 [502 p., pb., ISBN 978-3-95593-503-0]
- Bernhard Gál, Updating the History of Sound Art: Additions, Clarifications, More Questions. In: Leonardo Music Journal, vol. 27, USA 2017
- Bernhard Gál, Klangkunst (encyclopedia article). In: Jörn Peter Hiekel/Christian Utz (ed.), Lexikon Neue Musik, Metzler, Germany 2016
- Bernhard Gál, Analyse der Mikrostruktur von Walking Bass Lines. Musicological thesis, Institut für Musikwissenschaft, University of Vienna, Austria 1997

== See also ==
- List of Austrians in music
