= Kai Fagaschinski =

- Born: July 10, 1974 (age 51); Dannenberg, Lower Saxony, Germany
- Genres: Jazz
- Occupations: Musician, clarinet player, composer

Kai Fagaschinski (born July 10, 1974 in Dannenberg, Lower Saxony) is a Berlin based free improvisational clarinet player and composer. He is self-taught, and his music has been described as "rooted in abstraction, but with an increasingly insidious melodious element."

== Discography ==
- "Here Comes The Sun" - with Barbara Romen and Gunter Schneider - Mikroton Recordings (2012)
- I’m So Awake/Sleepless I Feel - as a member of The Magic I.D. - Staubgold (2011)
- Musik - Ein Porträt in Sehnsucht - with Burkhard Stangl - Erstwhile (2009)
- Till My Breath Gives Out - as a member of The Magic I.D. - Erstwhile (2008)
- Mainstream - as a member of The International Nothing - Ftarri (2006)
- First Time I Ever Saw Your Face - as a member of Kommando Raumschiff Zitrone - Quincunx (2006)
- Going Round in Serpentines - with Bernhard Gal - Charhizma (2005)
- Los Glissandinos: Stand Clear - Creative Sources (2005)
- No Furniture - Creative Sources (2004)
- Rebecca [two variations] - Charhizma (2003)
