= Murburn concept =

In the field of enzymology and cellular physiology, murburn is a term coined by Kelath Murali Manoj that explains the catalytic mechanism of certain redox-active proteins, providing an enhanced and more physically comprehensive framework for understanding diverse physiological processes. The term describes the spontaneous interactive equilibria among molecules, unbound ions and radicals or radiations, signifying a process of "mild unrestricted redox catalysis". Over the past decade, the concept has evolved from a mechanistic explanation for certain enzymatic reactions into a broader theoretical framework encompassing cellular bioenergetics, homeostasis, electrophysiology, sensory functions, biological coherence and intelligence.

Murburn was originally abstracted from "mured burning" (connoting a "closed burning", an oxidative process), and implies equilibriums involving diffusible reactive (oxygen/nitrogen/halogen) species (DRS/ROS/RNS/RHS). Though akin to the oxygen assisted combustion of fuel, unlike the flames produced in the open burning process, the biological reaction occurs in enclosed premises, is mild and does chemical, mechanical, and electrical work besides generating heat (but no flames). Such a reaction could also incur the chemical work of selective and specific electron or moiety transfers.

Further, though burning is a reaction that usually involves oxygen (aerobic process), "burning flames" produced by anoxic oxidants are also well-known. Therefore, the enzymes working via murburn scheme (in aerobic or anaerobic systems) could be called murzymes and the region around the biomolecule where the DRS interacts with the final 'substrate' is called 'murzone'. Murzymes are now more formally defined as biomolecules or proteins that generate, modulate, sustain, or utilize DRS, with the region of interaction termed the murzone. As per this perspective, the most fundamental reaction of aerobic life is identified as: O_{2} + e^{-} → O_{2}^{*-} ; ΔG = -250 kJ/mol, with the superoxide radical and its downstream products (hydrogen peroxide and hydroxyl radical) characterized as the "elixirs of life", rather than toxic waste (as deemed conventionally).

A hand-held electronic gadget is driven by the potential difference supplied by its battery and the current it draws, while a plugged-in appliance is driven by the voltage supplied by the outlet and the current it takes in. Murburn is the chemico-physical process that harnesses electromagnetic forces to fundamentally power cells, quite akin to the powering of electronic gadgets and electrical appliances. The wiring is solid and well-defined in the electrical gadgets/appliances, whereas in the soft and fluidic matter of the cells, it is rather undefined.

== The basic components and processes ==
Powering in cells entails the movement of electrons (or ions/moieties), setting forth the electromagnetic force. The cells and their immediate natural environments are composed of molecules, unbound ions, and radicals or radiations. They naturally spontaneously interact with each other, and move electrons. Erstwhile perceptions of useful/powering cellular reactions and biological intelligence entailed 2-electron movements and trans-phase ion-pumping. In the context of murburn, 1-electron movements form the fundamental pivots and such interactions (wherein electrons/ions/moieties are moved) are regulated by several components and factors.

Molecules – Usually any electron-rich or reduced molecule, but particularly with an extended pi-electronic system or metallic centers with d electrons or a combination of both, could serve as a murzyme catalyst. A redox protein/enzyme optimally qualifies for this role because it has one or more cofactors with the required attribute. (e.g. hemeproteins, flavoproteins, Cu/Zn proteins, etc.). Occasionally, some proteins that lack the above cofactors but have high amounts of charged residues and suitably located substrate binding sites could also aid DROS dynamics and catalysis (e.g. lactate dehydrogenase, transducin in outer disks of rod cells in eye, Complex V, basal module of bacterial flagellar assembly, etc.)

Unbound ions – naturally occurring ions of several types, carrying or relaying charges

Radicals – transiently generated reactive species in milieu (particularly, oxygen-centric), also formed from any additive or in situ components

Radiations – transiently impinging or exchanged in the system, of a broad spectral range

Murburn concept postulates that cells are fundamentally powered by electron-displacements (or electron-movements) spontaneously brought out because of the interactions of its component redox-active molecules, unbound ions, and radicals or radiations, setting forth electromagnetic force, thereof. Cells are deemed as reducing environments in which oxygen can spontaneously gain electron (to make DRS like superoxide (via the fundamental equation mentioned in 3rd paragraph). Such inevitable DRS formation is an inherently stochastic process, which involves Effective Charge Separation (ECS), thereby setting up a Chemico-Electromagnetic Matrix (CEM). This ECS-DRS-CEM enables the Powering, Coherence, Homeostasis, Electro-Mechanical and Sensing-response (PCHEMS, the immediate physico-chemical features) activities within a cell and facilitates cellular functioning as Simple Chemical Engine (SCE). This fundamental logic forms the core of biological intelligence also. Thus, the stochastic murburn concept becomes a fundamental operational principle of life, complementing the central dogma (which charts out the deterministic flow of biological information, that is genetic sequences form mRNA which serve as the scaffolds for the formation of proteins, which in turn carry out very deterministic and "manufacturing line" like reactions in cells).

== Salient features ==
While enzyme activities are classically defined by the deterministic interaction of the protein with its substrate at a defined active-site (necessitating a topological recognition of the interactive participants), murburn scheme obligatorily invokes a DRS (or a diffusible radical) for carrying out this agenda. The conventional enzyme-substrate interaction scheme invokes Fischer's lock and key type affinity or Koshland's induced fit theory. That is a substrate is identified by the enzyme by virtue of a topographical complementation, and thereafter, the enzyme-substrate complex undergoes a "transition-state", leading to products. Such a system shows certainty/determinism and stoichiometry (like a manufacturing line of any product in an industry), usually abides by the standard Michaelis-Menten scheme of catalysis and the inhibitors may be competitive, non-competitive, uncompetitive, etc. The classical enzymes have a unique substrate or a well-defined set of substrates.

The murburn paradigm does not deny the well-established classical mechanism above. However, it goes beyond the contexts of active-site catalysis. There are also important caveats like an additive may serve as an inhibitor or activator, depending on its own or/and the reaction-components' concentrations.

Murburn schemes (as shown in Figure 1) may invoke an enzyme-substrate complementation, but this aspect is not obligatory. The binding may be of high or low affinity (if any), it may also be delocalized and could be outside the active site. Murzymes may have multiple reaction sites and transition states (TS), as shown in Figure 2, owing to the involvement of DRS. Therefore, the classical enzyme catalysis can be deemed as a subset or special case of the larger schematic set of murburn, wherein the reactive locus is the unique active-site and reaction mechanism follows a unique transition state (TS). The kinetics of the reaction may at times not be traceable with standard models because the DRS is subjected to multiple equilibriums (which are contingent upon diverse reaction components) and the product of interest may be favorably formed in discrete concentrations of the protagonists involved.

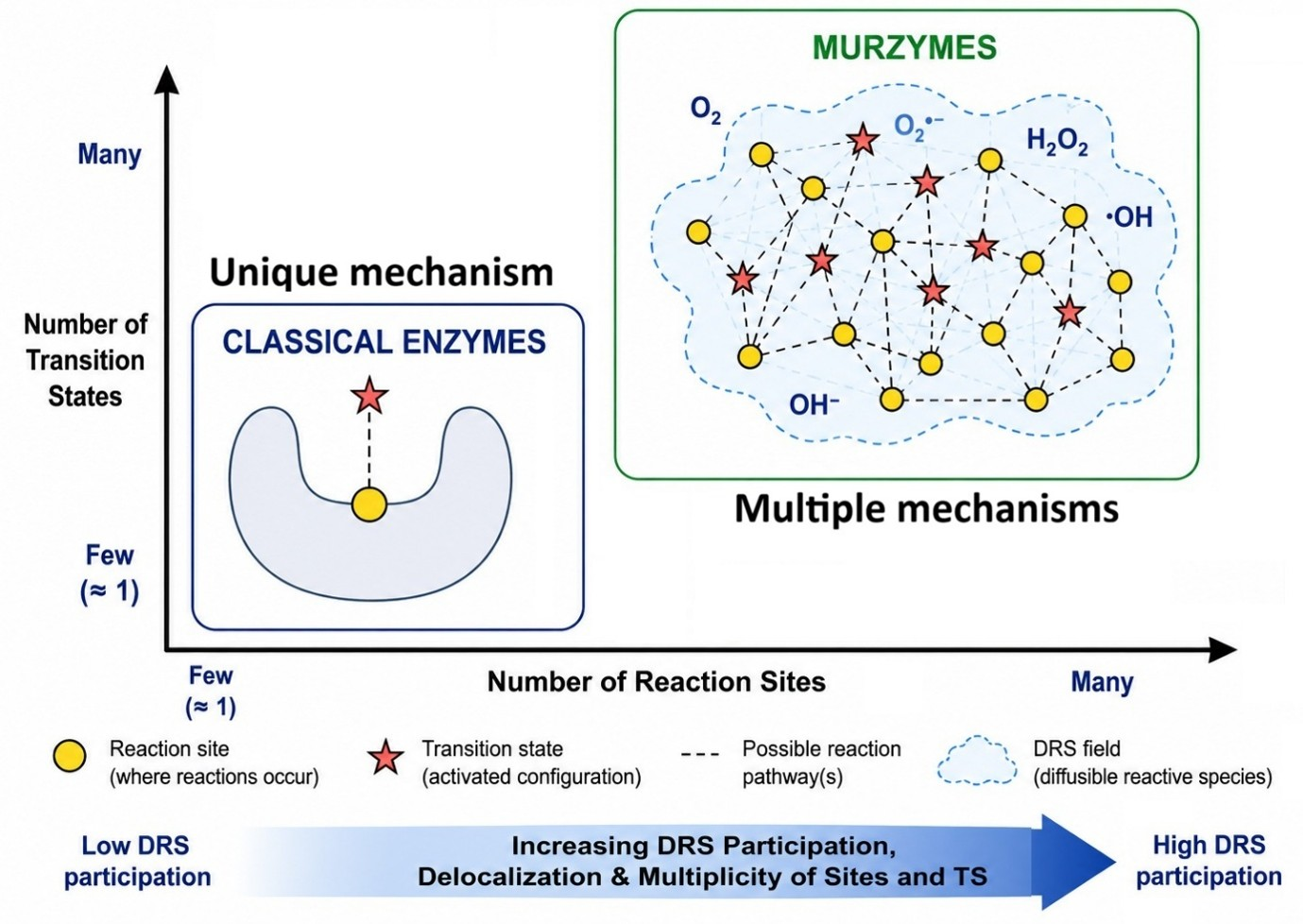
Figure 2: Owing to the involvement of DRS, the Murzymes manifest many reaction sites and transition states.

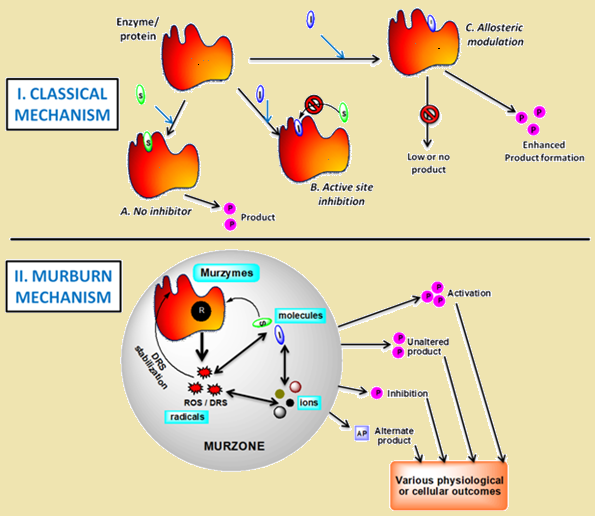
Figure 1: Comparison of classical enzyme mechanism and the contextual extension afforded with murburn concept, which considers diffusible reactive species (DRS) as a vital participant in routine metabolism/physiology. AP, I, P, R and S stand for alternate product, influencing additive, product, redox center and substrate, respectively.

Therefore, the outcomes in such murzyme/murburn systems could be subjected to a lot of uncertainty and the overall reaction scheme might exhibit varying and non-integral stoichiometry. The modulators/influencers (activators or inhibitors) may work by mixed modalities, owing to interactions with the protein, substrate, DRS or the reaction intermediates thereof. The murzymes may have a wide variety of substrates, as the reaction scheme is dependent on multiple modalities of interactions and outcomes. These realities of physiological function seek us to overcome the aesthetic perspective that DRS are mere manifestations of pathophysiology.

A relevant comparison in the context is that of the role of knife in the kitchen. The fact that knives (analogous to the reactive DRS) can easily inflict wounds, and the presence of knife-racks, cutting boards and gloves in kitchen (analogous to enzymes like superoxide dismutase and catalase, membrane-embedded proteins with one-electron active redox centers, etc.) does not mean that knife is a dangerous component that is avoided. On the contrary, it is an important tool that is used with adequate care. Quite similarly, the cellular machinery has evolved to harness the reaction potential and utility of DRS. The stigmatic perspective/concern that DRS would wreak havoc in routine physiology is no more relevant because several decades of research has now clearly established that DRS are routinely observed and unavoidable in physiology, and they cannot be just wished away. It has also been demonstrated that Sustained Release Dynamics (SRD) of DRS could afford selectivity (choice of a particular reactant from a variety, say B from A, B, C and D) and specificity (attack at a specific locus, like alpha- or para- positions of a reactant). Therefore, such a selectivity can be compared to how setting fire to a damp cloth dipped in oil burns the oil first and minimally chars the cloth's fabric. Analogously, murburn activity entails cumulative collateral damage as an inevitable consequence, which leads to aging, and ultimately, death. This also explains why animals and plant components with high redox metabolism perish sooner.

Murburn concept stresses on the already well-established fundamental awareness that all molecules and processes in life have spatial, temporal, quantitative and contextual relevance. A comparison of the classical perspectives and murburn concept is given in the figure and the perceptional changes ushered in by murburn concept can be captured in the Table 1.

The new mechanism has been proposed as a fundamental (supplementary or complementary or abrogative) explanation for phenomena involving catalytic electron or moiety transfers, chemico-physical changes and unusual observations in various experimental, ecological, metabolic and physiological scenarios. Fundamentally, in its essence, murburn concept advocates the thesis that DRS are vital requirements for routine metabolic and physiological functions. Biological theories are ratified by their ability to explain the effects of toxic principles. The murburn theory is validated by its ability to explain the bioenergetic toxicity of low doses of cyanide and many other small ions to a variety of important life processes (like respiration and photosynthesis). In its expanded form, the framework now encompasses the ECS-DRS-CEM-PCHEMS-SCE postulates, which collectively present murburn as a systems-level seamlessly integrating principle for understanding life's operations.

Table 1: Salient perception changes ushered in by murburn concept
Criteria/Role	Classical perception	Murburn concept
Oxygen	Active site of redox proteins	Murzone around diverse proteins
DR(O)S	Toxic waste	Essential intermediate
Additives	Active/allosteric sites	Multiple interactive equilibriums
Molecular interactions	Affinity driven complexations	Bimolecular collisions (± affinity)
Mechanistic route	Unique	Multiple
Protein structure	Conformational changes needed	Conformation change optional
Mandate/Control	Deterministic	Stochastic

== Application ==
=== Heme/flavin enzymology and electron transfer phenomena ===
Enzymes containing heme and flavin groups (as exemplified by peroxidases, catalases, reductases, etc.) are ubiquitous in cellular systems. While several moiety and electron transfer reactions they catalyze are mediated at the active site (heme/flavin center), some reactions are mediated via diffusible species. Going beyond the Michaelis-Menten paradigm to explain the outcomes of the latter types of reactions (with various additives and inhibitors) is the core purview of murburn concept. Recent quantitative treatments provide mathematical foundations for explaining the mechanism and kinetics of catalytic electron-transfers in murburn processes, particularly involving heme-enzymes like peroxidases and P450s. Evidence was also provided that inter-protein electron transfer via long-distance outer sphere mechanism is a rather unlikely mechanism.

=== Ecology ===
Fungal heme haloperoxidases (like chloroperoxidase) and other such proteins are the most important agents responsible for the generation of the vast majority of all natural halogenated organics in the environment and hemeperoxidases are also responsible for the breakdown of plant lignocellulosic materials. Thus, the murburn activities of hemeperoxidases are very important for explaining the carbon/halogen cycles. A recent article expands this framework to explain biodiversity generation and ecological integration, arguing that murburn processes influence ecosystem-level turnover, elemental cycling, biodiversity generation, and ecological integration, representing a foundational principle linking cellular murburn with macroscopic ecological order and evolution.

=== Drug/Xenobiotic metabolism ===
Man-made drugs and xenobiotics present a molecular topology that the cellular system may not be aware of, and therefore, a definite active-site affinity-based identification of the alien molecule may not be feasible. Also, the classical P450cam based model fails to explain the promiscuity of reduction of dozens of liver microsomal cytochrome P450s by a unique reductase (which is distributed at much lower concentrations) and it is also inexplicable therein how diverse drug molecules are reacted by a single CYP (or conversely, why some CYPs do not convert a given drug). Furthermore, drug-drug interactions based on active-site binding effects alone cannot explain the outcomes. With the obligatory involvement of DRS, the murburn scheme affords a tangible modality to account for the way the hepatocytes deal with such challenges and the new model could potentially explain outcomes of mutations and diverse types of drug interactions.

=== Cellular respiration thermogenesis and dynamic homeostasis ===
In the initial phase of evolution, an affinity-based identification may not have been present. Also, mitochondria possess finger-countable protons whereas tens of thousands of purported proton-pumping protein complexes. Further, oxygen is a highly mobile molecule that cannot be expected to remain non-reactive in the presence of the multitude of redox centers present in the mitochondrial membrane respiratory complexes. With respect to these considerations, the classical electron transport chain (ETC) based chemiosmotic rotary ATP synthesis (CRAS) model becomes untenable. The murburn model presents a new interpretation of the physiology of cellular respiration: including oxidative phosphorylation, thermogenesis and dynamic redox homeostasis. Also, the effects of a wide bevy of respiratory toxins (as exemplified by cyanide and other ions) to diverse physiologies and life forms are explained by the murburn scheme, which invokes DRS. The two-part review published in AIP Advances (2023) consolidates the thermodynamic/mechanistic aspect of murburn paradigm of bioenergetics. The structures of membrane proteins are explained with the murburn model in a BBA paper. A recent article presents the revolutionary murburn lessons on the roles of oxygen in life, conclusively demonstrating that cyanide and several other ions' toxicity negates electron transport chains and proton pumps. The oxygen-centric effective charge separation and DRS-based murburn model is demonstrated to afford satisfactory rationales for both acute and chronic toxicities of diverse ions.

=== Hemoglobin in erythrocyte physiology ===
RBCs function viably for about 4 months, although lacking a nucleus (for genetic regulations) or mitochondria (for carrying out the classical oxidative phosphorylation). A quantitative assessment shows that the glycolytic machinery present within is inadequate for the bioenergetic requirements of erythrocytes. Murburn-based explorations revealed that the highly packed tetrameric hemoglobin could synthesize ATP using a DRS-based logic. The new perspective affords better structure-function correlations for the various monomers (A, B & F) of the protein and roles of nicotinamide nucleotides and bisphosphoglycerate. This understanding has significant implications for thalassemia and other respiratory diseases, as elaborated in a 2023 publication.

=== Hormesis and idiosyncratic dose responses ===
It has been a long-standing conundrum as to how certain molecules may produce a physiological effect at a low concentration whereas little impact is seen at higher concentrations. Classical ligand-receptor and enzyme-substrate binding interactive scheme can afford only mono-phasic (hyperbolic) or bell-shaped (when a molecule becomes toxic above a critical level) dose responses. Murburn concept affords a molecular explanation for such hormetic and certain types of idiosyncratic (person to person or case dependent "reactions") physiological dispositions.

=== Oxygenic photosynthesis ===
The tapping of sunlight's energy forms the primary means of provision of carbon-centered organic molecules for sustaining life on our planet. The classical explanations of Kok-Joliot cycle, Z-scheme, Q-cycle, etc. were demonstrated to be untenable. A murburn model (involving DROS) of sunlight harvesting was recently proposed as a mechanism for the explanation of Emerson effect and several other observations (like the enhancement effect of bicarbonate ions on oxygen evolution, the enhancement of chloride ions on e-transfers in vitro, etc.) that were incompatible with the classical purview.

=== Ionic differentials and electrophysiology ===
Classical membrane theory espouses that ionic differentials in and out of cells arise caused by pumping by membrane-embedded proteins like Na-K-ATPase. Also in this purview, the source of trans-membrane potential (TMP) results due to difference of concentration of ions across phases. In the context or TMP fluctuations, murburn model brings in a new perspective of effective charge separation leading to an excess of negative charges transiently resulting inside, due to the ability of oxygen to accept free electrons. Further, preferential co-solubilization of cations by respiratory activity has been pointed out as another reason for ion-differentials. Murburn concept also explains the structure-function correlation of Na,K-ATPase, suggesting it functions as a murzyme facilitating thermodynamic equilibriums at the membrane-interface rather than as a classical ion pump. A comprehensive 2026 publication in the International Journal of Biological Macromolecules provides a detailed comparison of affinity-binding and murburn models for cellular cation-transporters, further consolidating the murburn perspective on electrophysiology. Discounting the thermodynamic/kinetic feasibility of high-throughput and highly selective ion-pumps and channels, it also provides a mathematical relation for transmembrane potential, based on anionic DRS produced inside.

=== Physiology of vision ===
The traditional visual cycle does not have any direct role for oxygen and entails the rods and cones serving as the primary photo-transduction agents. It involves retinal cis-trans conformation change and ejection from rhodopsin, conformation change of transducin and cycling via the retinal pigmented epithelium. In the new charted murburn cascade, photoexcitation of rhodopsin leads to the formation of superoxide, which attacks the GDP bound on alpha transducin, forming GTP, which detaches and gets converted to GDP by the beta module of transducin. The liberated GDP is an allosteric activator of phosphodiesterase-6, which enables the activation of c-GMP cascade. Therefore, in the murburn purview, oxygen is directly involved in visual physiology and rod/cone cells are the ultimate source of electrons. The murburn model also provides a better platform to explain the resolution, depth perception, architecture of eye and its evolution.

=== Lactate dehydrogenase (LDH) ===
Classical perception deems that isozyme LDH-A converts pyruvate to lactate whereas LDH-B converts lactate to pyruvate, the reaction being freely reversible via the same mechanistic route. Murburn concept corrected this erroneous perception and provided thermodynamic and structural insights to demarcate a new pathway and mechanism for LDH functioning in liver, using DRS. Muscles have four folds the concentration of the same isozyme of LDH-A, which is also found in liver. Therefore, the classical explanation fails to reason why lactate must be transported to liver or mitochondria for effective recycling. Murburn concept reasons out such conundrums and also affords a new approach for understanding Warburg effect and therapy of cancer.

=== Post-translational and epigenetic outcomes ===
Since murburn processes can introduce oxidative and group transfer (halogenation, phosphorylation, hydroxylation, etc.) reactions, the various biomolecules (like proteins, DNA, matrix components, etc.) could be subjected to corresponding modifications, leading to metabolo-proteomic influences. A comprehensive 2024 review in the *Journal of Cellular Physiology* elaborates on murburn posttranslational modifications of proteins, detailing how murburn/murzyme functionalism is integral to cellular existence and how cells must incorporate the inherently stochastic nature of operations mediated by DRS. The review dispels myths around DRS-functions and provides systematic parsing of murburn modifications of proteins, noting that while many such modifications may be harmless, some could have deleterious or beneficial physiological implications.

=== Cyclooxygenase and inflammation ===
Recent research and review articles published in *Biomedical Reviews* (2021 & 2024) has re-interpreted the structure-function correlations and inhibitions of mammalian cyclooxygenase isozymes using murburn mechanism, providing new perspectives on inflammation and drug inhibition mechanisms and challenging classical interpretations of COX function.

=== Bacterial motility ===
The "auto-assembled molecular rotary" functionalisms in biology is conclusively disclaimed with murburn-centric criticisms. A 2023 publication in the *Journal of Biomolecular Structure and Dynamics* questions the rotary functionality in the bacterial flagellar system and proposes a murburn model for motility. The paper points out that vital redox activity (not proton motive force or TMP) powers the molecular and macroscopic activities of cells, including flagella, and that flagellar movement is noted even in ambiances lacking or countering the directionality mandates sought by pmf/TMP. A consolidation of this model was further published in *Biomedical Reviews* (2024).

=== Relevance to disease and parallel systems of medicine ===
The relevance of murburn concept in genetic and acquired respiratory diseases, including thalassemia, has been pointed out, suggesting that DRS-mediated pathophysiological mechanisms underlie various hematological and pulmonary disorders. The perspective presents the true physiological function of oxygen as enabling ECS and the generation of DR(O)S, which must now be seen as the quintessential elixir of life, although they might have undesired effects when present in the wrong amounts, places and times. It is also projected that murburn can help understand practices of some parallel systems of medicine.

=== Bionics and cyborg systems ===
A 2025 article in *Biomedical Reviews* projects tangible frameworks and examples of how murburn concept could afford a seamless interlacing of man-made synthetic components with biological systems, particularly within the contexts of intelligence/controls, bioenergetics, metabolic and sensing-response agenda. The authors discuss mandates wherein analog-digital conversions could be achieved, and project the scope and limitations of murburn-based approaches in futuristic bionic-cyborg technology. The work suggests that murburn-based chemistry could lead to new forms of biohybrid systems that operate seamlessly with natural biology, revolutionizing areas such as neural interfaces, prosthetics, and implantable medical devices.

=== Origin and evolution of life ===
Earlier perceptions considered proton/ionic gradients as the primary bioenergetic principle. In this purview, it was difficult to conceive how a purported molecular nanomotor like Complex V could evolve for ATP synthesis, at the primordial states of life's origin. Murburn concept offers effective charge separation as a simpler principle for the cell's viability as a simple chemical engine that could do useful work. The murburn view projects TMP as a side-product of cellular metabolic activity, and not as the primary driving force of cellular bioenergetics. A 2025 publication in the *International Journal of Molecular Sciences* by Jaeken and Manoj discusses murburn bioenergetics and the origins-sustenance-termination-evolution of life, proposing the emergence of intelligence from a network of molecules, unbound ions, radicals and radiations. A detailed "Wet-and-Murburn-Membrane-Model" published in two parts in *Biomedical Reviews* (2025) presents an entirely new understanding of membranes and of the fluid they encapsulate, arguing that the primary roles of two 'forgotten' substances, water and oxygen, disclose an entirely new understanding of membranes and bioenergetics.

== Relation to classical theories and criticism ==
Murburn concept has been used to criticize classical perceptions like Peter Mitchell's and Paul Boyer's chemiosmotic rotary ATP synthesis mechanism. These criticisms have been called into question. These criticisms have in turn been responded to. A 2025 article in *Biomedical Reviews* presents a detailed analysis of how acute toxicity of cyanide and several ions conclusively negate electron transport chains and proton pumps, arguing that the classical membrane-pump theory and ETC-CRAS (electron transport chain - chemiosmotic rotary ATP synthesis) model are unequivocally falsified and must be replaced by the murburn paradigm. The work lists several blatant anti-realistic issues with the classical model, including evolutionary probability concerns, the thermodynamic and kinetic realities of oxygen reactivity in a reducing environment, the physical impossibility of proton pumping given the aprotic nature of mitochondrial matrices, and the untenability of rotary reversible function in complex macromolecular assemblies.[7] In spite of scathing criticisms of established models, the mainstream researchers do not engage murburn and this was called out by the proponent of murburn concept.[75+]

== Reception, outreach and independent assessments ==
The late Lowell Hager (Member, NAS-USA and Professor of Biochemistry at UIUC) recognized the DRS-mediated murburn selectivity/specificity mechanism in chloroperoxidase. Two books authored by respected European researchers were published in the UK that favorably discussed murburn concept. Articles based in murburn concept were given cover-page credits in four annual volumes (2017, 2018, 2019 and 2020) of Biomedical Reviews (the official journal of Bulgarian Society for Cell Biology) and the 167th (December 2021) volume of Progress in Biophysics and Molecular Biology (Elsevier). The American Institute of Physics portal published a two-part review of murburn concept explaining multiple metabolic and physiological routines.

== Independent citations and growing recognition ==
Recent literature demonstrates growing recognition of the murburn concept beyond the originating group. A landmark 2025 review by Zhang et al. in *Cell Stress* positions murburn as a pivotal founding principle of life, integrating it as a foundational element for explaining cellular function. The authors portray murburn as a "novel paradigm shift in redox-integrated bio-physico-chemical sciences," integrating stochastic processes via DRS, murzymes and murzone networks, with DRS reframed as "versatile elixirs" essential for respiration, immunity, and metabolic flexibility.

Yuan et al. (2025) in *Cell & Molecular Biology Letters* discuss murburn's role in ROS heterogeneity and carcinogenesis, noting that "According to this model, DROS such as superoxide anion and peroxide are not merely metabolic waste; they actively mediate reactions through free radical mechanisms," while tempering enthusiasm by stating, "Despite its explanatory potential, the murburn model remains a subject of vigorous debate, necessitating rigorous experimental validation."

Francati et al. (2023) in *Biomedical Reviews* examine the Janus face of oxidative stress and portray murburn as an alternative enzyme mechanism involving "closed burning" with DRS, noting that "Enzymes carrying out the Murburn system are defined as 'Murzymes,' and the region where DRS interact is termed 'Murzone'." Chaldakov et al. (2024) in *Pharmaceuticals* invoke murburn to explain ROS/RNS interference in NGF-TrkA-microtubule-lipid raft signaling in Alzheimer's disease.

Abadie (2024) in *Frontiers in Bioscience* highlights murburn as a "thermodynamically and kinetically valid model" superseding proton-centric ETC views, stating: "However, a more recent model based on the Murburn concept was explained by Manoj." These favorable citations across diverse disciplines signal murburn's growing global traction, elevating it from a challenger hypothesis to a framework increasingly acknowledged in mainstream literature.

== Algorithmic identification and formal modeling ==
Recent developments have seen the application of algorithmic and AI/ML-based approaches to analyze the murburn framework. A 2026 publication in *Biomed Research International* presents algorithmic identification of murzymes and murburn mechanisms based on structural, theoretical, experimental and generic features. The work demonstrates that enzymes and reaction systems can now be parsed into murburn/murzyme systems using algorithic nd AI-ML logic, breaking the monotonous dominance of enforced consensus. A 2025 publication on quantitative treatments for murburn kinetics in *Biomed Research International* provides the mathematical formalism for murburn electron-transfer and catalysis rates. website is also provided to parse proteins into classical or murburn type.

== Future Prospects ==
The murburn concept continues to evolve, with recent publications extending its applications to post-translational modifications, bacterial motility, inflammation, disease pathophysiology, bionics-cyborg systems, ecology-biodiversity-evolution, and the wet-and-murburn-membrane-model. The concept's proponents argue for its incorporation in teaching and research as the next step in the sequence of scientific progression. A 2025 article in *Biomedical Reviews* outlines strategies ahead for enhancing murburn's outreach and acceptance, emphasizing that paradigm-challenging concepts advance by solving problems orthodoxy cannot solve, quietly, repeatedly, and reproducibly. The focus is shifting to building a "murburn research ecosystem" and decentralizing validation from self-appointed authorities, with students now able to engage in real-time debate with AI portals to see that reasoning can critically acclaim the murburn concept, slowly breaking the authority-enforced consensus.

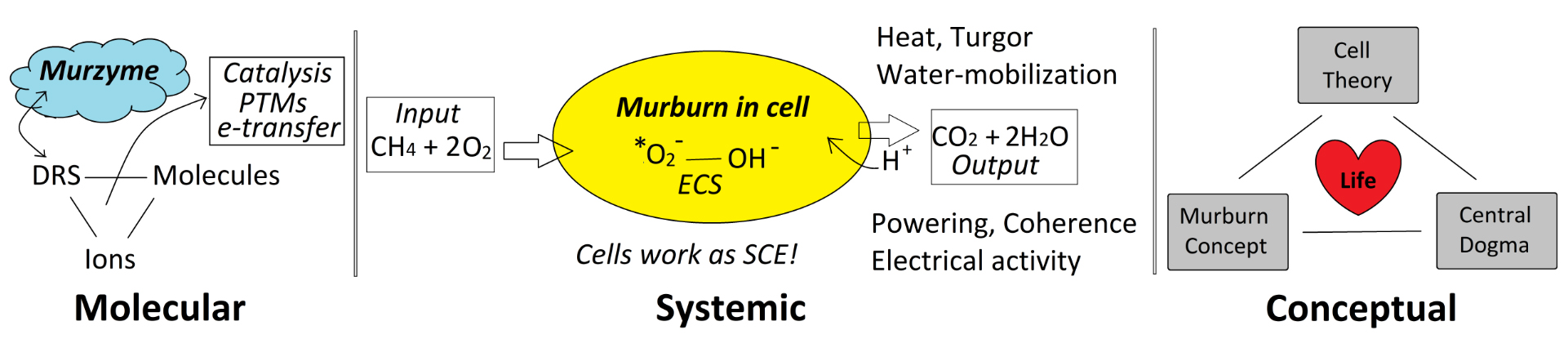
In the left panel, molecular interactions involved in murburn concept are shown. A murzyme may use (generate/modulate/stabilize/utilize) DRS, which may enter into interactive equilibriums with diverse or select molecules and ions in milieu, giving rise to catalytic electron or moiety transfers, including posttranslational modifications (PTMs) of auto or hetero proteins. The central panel shows the overall systemic or macroscopic physiological overview of ECS-initiated murburn in cells leading to their functioning as SCEs. Methane (CH_{4}) is considered as an example of nutrient input. One of its murburn products (CO_{2}) is a voidable gas and the other product (water, H_{2}O) is also the solvent. Owing to colligative effects, the latter is spontaneously mobilized to move out, thereby retaining cellular composition in a dynamic fashion. Physically, these processes also generate heat and turgor. Chemically, the transient DRS enable electrical activity, power otherwise non-spontaneous reactions and enable seamless coherence. The conceptual importance of murburn concept as a founding principle of life is shown in the right panel. While the vitally deterministic central dogma allows for topology/affinity based selectivity, the inevitable stochastic (based in chanced events) murburn processes complement with other parameters needed to support life.
