= Johannes Schultz (composer) =

German composer (1582–1653)

Johannes Schultz (26 June 1582 – 16 February 1653) was a German composer.

== Biography ==
Schultz was born in Lüneburg and in 1605 took a job as organist at St. John's Church in Dannenberg in the Duchy of Brunswick-Lüneburg in Lower Saxony. In his early compositions, Schultz combines old Protestant hymns with Dutch-Italian motet styles. Other of his works point to equally eclectic sources in courtly and bourgeois songs and instrumental forms. In his later works, he was—like his contemporaries Heinrich Schütz and Heinrich Albert—working new ground between older motet styles and newer song forms.

Schultz was supported to some extent by Prince August von Wolfenbüttel and his wife, but in 1653 he died in Dannenberg in poverty.
