= List of free improvising musicians and groups =

This is a list of musicians and groups who compose and play free music, or free improvisation. In alphabetical order:

== Musicians ==
- Susan Alcorn – pedal steel guitar
- Jason Alder – clarinet, bass clarinet, contrabass clarinet
- Thomas Ankersmit – saxophone, synthesizer
- Albert Ayler – saxophone
- Richard Barrett – electronics, sampler
- Derek Bailey – guitar
- Conny Bauer – trombone
- Burkhard Beins – percussion
- Han Bennink – percussion
- Steve Beresford – piano
- Jean-Jacques Birge – synthesizer
- Jeb Bishop – trombone
- Anthony Braxton – saxophones
- John Wolf Brennan – piano, prepared piano, melodica, pipe organ
- Olie Brice – double bass
- Peter Brötzmann – saxophone, tárogató
- Tony Buck – percussion
- John Butcher – saxophone
- Captain Beefheart – saxophone, clarinet, voice
- Kent Carter – double bass
- Graham Clark – violin
- Ornette Coleman – saxophone
- Tom Cora – cello, bass guitar, drums
- Lol Coxhill – saxophone
- Marilyn Crispell – piano
- Stephen Crowe – guitar, electric guitar
- Alvin Curran - electronics
- Chris Cutler – percussion
- Tobias Delius – saxophone
- Poulomi Desai - modified sitars and electronics
- Christy Doran – guitar
- Mark Dresser – double bass
- Kevin Drumm – guitar, synthesizer
- Paul Dunmall – saxophone
- Ellery Eskelin – tenor saxophone
- Karlheinz Essl – electronics
- Julia Feldman – voice
- Simon H. Fell – double bass
- Robert Fripp - guitar, mellotron
- Fred Frith – guitar, violin
- Cor Fuhler – piano, keyolin, synthesizer
- Bernhard Gal – electronics
- Joel Garten – piano
- Charles Gayle – saxophone, piano, bass clarinet
- Seppe Gebruers – the first improvised quartertone pianist
- Richard Grayson – piano
- Mats Gustafsson – saxophone, flutophone
- Barry Guy – double bass
- Keiji Haino – guitar, voice
- Hans Hassler - accordion
- Gerry Hemingway – drums
- Zach Hill – drums
- Killick Erik Hinds – h'arpeggione
- Tim Hodgkinson – saxophone
- Theo Joergensmann – basset clarinet
- Ryan Jones – electric bass
- Henry Kaiser – guitar
- Leonel Kaplan – trumpet
- Basil Kirchin – drums
- Peter Kowald – double bass
- Savina Yannatou – voice
- Caroline Kraabel – saxophone
- Steve Lacy – saxophone
- Kathryn Ladano – bass clarinet
- Yuri Landman – string instruments
- Jeanne Lee – voice
- Thomas Lehn – synthesizer
- George E. Lewis – trombone, electronics
- Joelle Leandre – double bass, vocals
- Fred Lonberg-Holm – cello
- Paul Lovens – drums
- Paul Lytton – drums
- Frederik Magle – organ
- Radu Malfatti – trombone
- Joe Maneri – saxophone, clarinet
- Mario Mariani – piano, objects
- Elio Martusciello – computer, guitar
- Mattin
- Guerino Mazzola – piano
- Misha Mengelberg – piano, toys
- Phil Minton – voice
- Louis Moholo – drums
- Gabriela Montero – piano
- Michael Moore – saxophone, clarinet, bass clarinet
- Thurston Moore – guitar
- Butch Morris – cornet, conductor
- Jamie Muir – percussion
- Stephen Nachmanovitch – violin, electric violin, viola
- Lauren Newton - voice
- Maggie Nicols – voice
- Mary Oliver – violin, viola
- Tony Oxley – percussion
- Sonia Paço-Rocchia – bassoon, found and invented instruments, live electronics
- Evan Parker – saxophones
- William Parker – double bass
- Mike Patton – voice, piano, synthesizer
- Barre Phillips – double bass
- Andreas Paolo Perger – guitar
- Pierre Pincemaille – organ
- Eddie Prevost – percussion, drums
- Sun Ra — Keyboards, piano, minimoog
- Randy Raine-Reusch – zheng, khaen, sho, kayageum, ichigenkin
- Lee Ranaldo – guitar
- Marc Rebillet — electronics, keyboards, voice
- Hans Reichel – guitar, daxophone
- Ernst Reijseger – cello
- Omar Rodriguez-Lopez – guitar
- Keith Rowe – guitar
- John Russell – guitar
- Paul Rutherford – trombone
- Frederic Rzewski
- Carlos Sandoval – gloves with sensors
- Giancarlo Schiaffini – trombone
- Alexander von Schlippenbach – piano
- Steven Schoenberg – piano
- Irene Schweizer – piano
- Matthew Shipp – piano
- Gary Smith – guitar
- John Stevens – percussion, trumpet
- György Szabados – piano
- Cecil Taylor – piano
- Benedict Taylor – viola
- Pat Thomas – piano, keyboards
- John Tilbury – piano
- Keith Tippett – piano
- Julie Tippetts – voice
- Tommy Vig – vibraphone, drums
- Bernard Vitet – trumpet
- Voice Crack – electronics
- Philipp Wachsmann – violin
- John Bruce Wallace – electric guitar
- Jane Wang (composer and musician) – double bass
- Trevor Watts – saxophone
- Kenny Wheeler – trumpet
- Wolter Wierbos – trombone
- Wu Fei - guzheng
- Otomo Yoshihide – guitar, turntable
- Reynaldo Young – guitar, electronics
- Carlos Zingaro – violin, electronics
- John Zorn – saxophone
- Frank Zappa – Guitar
- Jerry Garcia – Guitar, Face Stealer
- Bob Weir – Guitar
- Phil Lesh – Bass Guitar
- Bill Kreutzmann – Drums
- Mickey Hart – Drums, Percussion
- Ron "Pigpen" McKernan – Hammond organ, Harmonica
- Keith Godchaux – Piano
- Trey Anastasio – Guitar, Face Melter
- Mike Gordon – Bass Guitar
- Page McConnell – Piano, Keyboards
- Jon Fishman – Drums

== Groups ==
- A Band
- AMM
- Borbetomagus
- Brotherhood of Breath
- EOTO
- Feminist Improvising Group
- Fred Frith Trio
- Goose
- Grateful Dead
- Gruppo di Improvvisazione Nuova Consonanza
- Henry Cow
- Henry Now
- Islak Köpek
- King Crimson
- Last Exit
- M.I.M.E.O.
- Massacre
- MATH
- Maybe Monday
- Mujician
- Musica Elettronica Viva
- The Necks
- nmperign
- Phish
- poire z
- Scatter
- Shaking Ray Levis
- Skeleton Crew
- Smegma
- Splatter Trio
- Spontaneous Music Ensemble
- Storm & Stress
- Supersilent
- Triangulation
- Un Drame Musical Instantane
- Wolf Eyes
- Zoochosis
- Zoviet France
- Pandemonium
