= Mikroton Recordings =

Independent record label

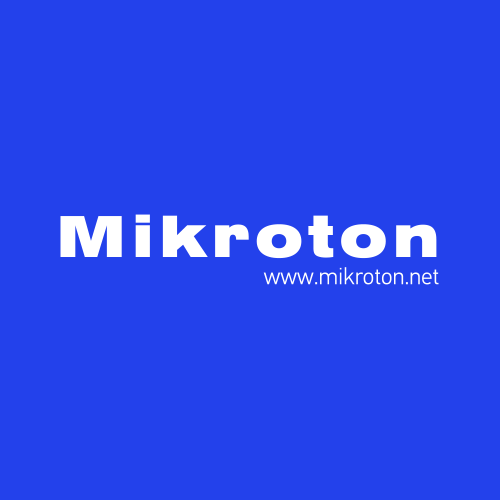
- Founded: 2008
- Founder: Kurt Liedwart
- Genre: electronic music, electroacoustic music, live electronic music, sound art, experimental music, minimalism, ambient, drone, post-rock
- Country of origin: Switzerland
- Location: Biel
- Official website: mikroton.kurtliedwart.com

Mikroton Recordings is an independent record label for experimental electronic music, founded by Kurt Liedwart and based in Biel, Switzerland. Mikroton works with a wide range of musicians working in the field of electronic music like sound artist Günter Müller, laptop improviser Christof Kurzmann, electronic musician Jason Kahn and pioneer of tabletop guitar pioneer Keith Rowe, turntablists Dieb13 and eRikm, sound artists Stephen Vitiello, Thomas Lehn, Marcus Schmickler, homemade electronics performer Norbert Möslang, guitarist Burkhard Stangl, composers of electroacoustic music Jérôme Noetinger, Angélica Castelló and others. It usually publishes drone, ambient, electronic, experimental music, and works with mixed electronic and acoustic instrumentation, exploring the intersection between electronic and acoustic fields. The label released two seminal compilation recordings for the Austrian group of artists known as klingt.org, who work in the fields of electroacoustic, experimental music, as well as the free improvisation scene in Berlin's Echtzeitmusik. In 2025, the label was shut down.

== Discography ==
- [mikroton cd 1] Günter Müller — Cym_Bowl
- [mikroton cd 2] Alan Courtis / Jaime Genovart / Christof Kurzmann / Pablo Reche — Palmar Zähler
- [mikroton cd 3] Jason Kahn / Asher — Planes
- [mikroton cd 4] Werner Dafeldecker / Christof Kurzmann / John Tilbury / Stevie Wishart — Werner Dafeldecker / Christof Kurzmann / John Tilbury / Stevie Wishart
- [mikroton cd 5 | 6] Klingt.org: 10 Jahre Bessere Farben
- [mikroton cd 7] Jason Kahn / Günter Müller / Christian Wolfarth — Limmat
- [mikroton cd 8] Hammeriver: Clare Cooper / Chris Abrahams / Christof Kurzmann / Tobias Delius / Clayton Thomas / Werner Dafeldecker / Tony Buck — Hammeriver
- [mikroton cd 9] WPB3: Nusch Werchowska / Mathias Pontévia / Heddy Boubaker — A Floating World
- [mikroton cd 10] Rhodri Davies / Mark Wastell — Live In Melbourne
- [mikroton cd 11] eRikm / Norbert Möslang — Stodgy
- [mikroton cd 12] Satanic Abandoned Rock & Roll Society: Tetuzi Akiyama / Naoaki Miyamoto / Utah Kawasaki / Atsuhiro Ito — Bloody Imagination
- [mikroton cd 13] Chris Abrahams / Lucio Capece — None Of Them Would Remember It That Way
- [mikroton cd 14 | 15 | 16] Echtzeitmusik Berlin
- [mikroton cd 17 | 18] Rick Reed / Keith Rowe / Bill Thompson — Shifting Currents
- [mikroton cd 19] Alessandro Bosetti / Chris Abrahams — We Who Had Left
- [mikroton cd 20 | mikroton vinyl 1] El Infierno Musical: Christof Kurzmann / Ken Vandermark / Eva Reiter / Clayton Thomas / Martin Brandlmayr — El Infierno Musical. A Tribute To Alejandra Pizarnik
- [mikroton cd 21 | 22] Catherine Jauniaux / eRikm — Mal Des Ardents / Pantoneon
- [mikroton cd 23] Barbara Romen / Kai Fagaschinski / Gunter Schneider — Here Comes The Sun
- [mikroton cd 24] Hanno Leichtmann — Minimal Studies
- [mikroton cd 25] Ilia Belorukov / Kurt Liedwart — Vtoroi
- [mikroton cd 26] Margareth Kammerer — Why Is The Sea So Blue
- [mikroton cd 27] NG4 Quartet: Keith Rowe / Anthony Taillard / Emmanuel Leduc / Julien Ottavi — A Quartet For Guitars
- [mikroton cd 28] Kazuhisa Uchihashi / Noid / Tamara Wilhelm — I Hope It Doesn't Work
- [mikroton cd 29] Common Objects: John Butcher / Rhodri Davies / Lee Patterson — Live In Morden Tower
- [mikroton cd 30] Angélica Castelló / Billy Roisz / Burkhard Stangl / Dieb13 — Scuba
- [mikroton cd 31] Michael Thieke Unununium — Nachtlieder
- [mikroton cd 32] Keith Rowe / Alfredo Costa Monteiro / Ilia Belorukov / Kurt Liedwart — Contour
- [mikroton cd 33 | 34 | dvd 35] Feedback: Order From Noise
- [mikroton cd 36] Casey Anderson / Jason Kahn / Günter Müller / Norbert Möslang / Mark Trayle — Five Lines
- [mikroton cd 37] eRikm / Martin Brandlmayr — Ecotone
- [mikroton cd 38] Burkhard Beins / Enrico Malatesta / Michael Vorfeld / Christian Wolfarth / Ingar Zach — Glück
- [mikroton cd 39 | 40] Simon James Phillips — Blage 3
- [mikroton cd 41 | 42] SQID — SQID
- [mikroton cd 43 | 44] Ryu Hankil, Noid, Matija Schellander and others — Foreign Correspondents
- [mikroton cd 45] Kurt Liedwart / Phil Raymond — Rim
- [mikroton cd 46] Keith Rowe / Martin Küchen — The Bakery
- [mikroton cd 47] Norbert Möslang / Ilia Belorukov / Kurt Liedwart — sale_interiora
- [mikroton cd 48] Strøm: Gaudenz Badrutt / Christian Müller — X
- [mikroton cd 49] Serge Baghdassarians / Boris Baltschun / Burkhard Beins — Будущее совершенное
- [mikroton cd 50] George Lewis & Splitter Orchester — Creative Construction Set™
- [mikroton cd 51] MKM: Jason Kahn / Günter Müller / Norbert Möslang — Instants // Paris
- [mikroton cd 52] Ease: Klaus Filip / Noid — No No No, No
- [mikroton cd 53] Cilantro: Angélica Castelló & Billy Roisz — Borderland
- [mikroton cd 54] Kurt Liedwart / Andrey Popovskiy / Martin Taxt — Hjem
- [mikroton cd 55] The Holy Quintet: Johnny Chang / Jamie Drouin / Dominic Lash / Dimitra Lazaridou-Chatzigoga / David Ryan — Borough
- [mikroton cd 56] Burkhard Beins / Lucio Capece / Martin Küchen / Paul Vogel — Fracture Mechanics
- [mikroton cd 57] Alfredo Costa Monteiro / Miguel A. Garcia — Aq'Ab'Al
- [mikroton cd 58] Junk & The Beast : Petr Vrba & Veronika Mayer — Trailer
- [mikroton cd 59] The Elks — This Is Not The Ant
- [mikroton cd 60] Thomas Lehn & Marcus Schmickler — Neue Bilder
- [mikroton cd 61] The Pitch & Splitter Orchester — Frozen Orchestra (Splitter)
- [mikroton cd 62] Chesterfield: Angélica Castelló & Burkhard Stangl — Consuelo
- [mikroton cd 63] Angélica Castelló & Jérôme Noetinger — Disturbio
- [mikroton cd 64] Yui Onodera & Stephen Vitiello — Quiver
- [mikroton cd 65] Günter Müller / Kurt Liedwart / Norbert Möslang — Ground
- [mikroton cd 66] MKM: Jason Kahn / Günter Müller / Norbert Möslang — teplo_dom
- [mikroton cd 67] Trio Sowari — Third Issue
- [mikroton cd 68] Kurt Liedwart x Julien Ottavi x Keith Rowe — L'Or
- [mikroton cd 69] Kurt Liedwart & Petr Vrba — Punkt
- [mikroton cd 70] Kurt Liedwart — Tone
- [mikroton cd 71] Jérôme Noetinger & SEC_ — La Cave Des Étendards
- [mikroton cs 72] Kurt Liedwart — Mare
- [mikroton cd 73] Ken Ganfield x Kurt Liedwart x Petr Vrba — Something Wrong There
- [mikroton cd 74] Wabi Experience — Wabi Experience
- [mikroton cd 76-85] Formanex with AMM, Christian Wolff, Keith Rowe, Ralf Wehowsky, John Tilbury, Phill Niblock, ONsemble, Seth Cluett, Radu Malfatti, Michael Pisaro, Julien Ottavi, Kasper T. Toeplitz — 20 Years Of Experimental Music
- [mikroton cd 86] FEN – No One’s Island
- [mikroton cd 87] Lars Åkerlund & Eryck Abecassis — Falls
- [mikroton cd 88] Andrea Ermke / Chris Abrahams / Marcello Busato / Arthur Rother — Sink
- [mikroton cd 89 | 90] Joke Lanz / Jason Kahn / Norbert Möslang / Günter Müller / Christian Weber — kangaroo_kitchen
- [mikroton cd 91] Burkhard Stangl & Dieb13 – Jardin Des Bruits
- [mikroton 92] MKM: Jason Kahn / Günter Müller / Norbert Möslang — Bangalore
- [mikroton 93] Periferiya: Christian Kobi / Tomas Korber / Kurt Liedwart / Christian Müller / Mikhail Myasoedov / Boris Shershenkov — Boundary Scan
- [mikroton 94] Schnee: Burkhard Stangl / Christof Kurzmann — Снег

== See also ==
- List of record labels

== Sources ==
- Feature on the label on Clear Spot show on Resonance FM: http://resonancefm.com/archives/21642
- The label's portrait in Austrian freiStil Magazine: http://freistil.klingt.org/index.html
- Nina Polaschegg about Mikroton Recordings in NOWJazz show of SWR2 radio: http://www.lastradiopoets.net/archives/31410%5B%5D
- Kurt Liedwart's interview with jazz critic Dmitry Ukhov on Radio Culture: http://www.moskva.fm/stations/FM_91.6/programs/%D0%B4%D0%BE%D0%BC%D0%B0%D1%88%D0%BD%D1%8F%D1%8F_%D0%BC%D1%83%D0%B7%D1%8B%D0%BA%D0%B0/2014-06-07_01:00
- Curt Cuisine. Gebrannte Kinder in Skug Magazine: https://skug.at/article7621.htm
- Thomas Shrubsole. Gently Down The Volga in The Sound Projector: http://www.thesoundprojector.com/2015/04/20/gently-down-the-volga/
- Paul Khimasia Morgan. Common Purpose in The Sound Projector: http://www.thesoundprojector.com/2014/09/13/common-purpose/
