= Poire z =

poire_z (pronounced "pwar-zed") was an electronic free improvisation music group formed in 1998. Its members all have long careers in improvised music; critic Fred Grand of Avant calls poire_z a "post-AMM supergroup."

== Band history ==
At a music festival at Nantes, France in 1998, percussionist Gunter Muller and turntablist Erikm were scheduled to perform as a duo. The same festival featured a performance by duo Voice Crack. The four musicians made an unscheduled collaboration, and afterwards formed a semi-regular quartet.

They recorded several albums and made a number of live appearances before disbanding. poire_z often invited a fifth musician as a guest: Keith Rowe, Phil Minton, Christian Marclay, Otomo Yoshihide, Sachiko M and others performed or recorded with the core quartet.

As with much free improvisation, poire_z's music is generally focused more on a group sound, and given the musicians' unorthodox approach to their instruments, it is often difficult to discern who is generating any individual sound. Aside from glimpses of Muller's occasionally unprocessed percussion, their music is nearly all electronic blips, clicks and droning like a shortwave radio tuned in to an extraterrestrial broadcast; critic Ed Howard described the group's music as "all whir and purr and throb, the soldered electronic exclamations of the Voice Crack duo spurting around the steady rhythmic drive of Muller and eRikm ... a dense cycling drone with harsh electronic interjections skipping over the top." One piece is described as "delicate tones, crackles and light bubbling sounds, resting and intermingling with characteristic weightlessness, only occasionally being interrupted by glimpses of harsher textures."

Voice Crack formally disbanded in about 2004, and poire_z have not recorded or performed since.

== Personnel ==
- Erikm: 3K-PAD∞System
- Gunter Muller: percussion, effects
- Andy Guhl and Norbert Möslang (who recorded as Voice Crack) on homemade electronics.

== Discography ==
- 1999 : Poire_Z - For4ears records
- 2001 : Presque_Chic - Sonoris
- 2002 : + - with Otomo Yoshihide, Sachiko M, and Christian Marclay - Erstwhile Records
- 2004 : Q - Poire Z's last performance, with guest vocalist Phil Minton
- Sampler
- 2000 : mottomo otomo - Trost Records
- 2000 : Hairles_handle - The Wire tapper 6
- 2002 : fb50 - fals.ch
- 2004 : The Wire Tapper 11 Poire_z + phil Minton - The Wire tapper 11
- 2008 : A SHORT HISTORY 2000-2005- Contemporary Art And Sound . Dolmen
- Post-Poire_Z
- Since 2004 Günter Müller & Norbert Moslang have also collaborated in trio or quartet.
- 2002 : Buda Rom Voice Crack & Günter Müller - For4ears
- 2003 : Oystered Voice Crack & Günter Müller & Oren Ambarchi - Audiosphere sub Rosa
- 2011 : Stodgy Erikm & Norbert Möslang - Mikroton Recordings
- 2016 : Pavillon du Lac with Günter Müller + Norbert Möslang + Erikm - Dolmen
- Sampler
- 2011 : Mikroton eRikm / Norbert Möslang - Mikroton
- 2011 : Below The Radar eRikm / Norbert Möslang - The Wire
- 2005 : t-u-b-e / gebeugt 2005 Norbert Möslang / eRikm - Wergo
- Pre-Poire_Z
- 1982 : Knack On - Norbert Möslang & Andy Guhl
- 1990 : Voice Crack – "Earflash" - V-Records, Uhlang Produktion
- 1996 : Table Chair and Hatstand - Voice Crack + Günter Müller + Jim O’Rourke - Uhlang Production
