= Dieb13 =

- Birth name: Dieter Kovačič
- Born: 1973 (age 51–52)
- Origin: Vienna, Austria
- Genres: Experimental Music, Noise Music
- Instrument(s): Turntables, Computer
- Years active: 1995-current
- Labels: Charhizma, Mego, For4Ears, Erstwhile Records
- Website: http://dieb13.klingt.org

Dieb13 is the performing name of Dieter Kovačič, a Viennese-based avant-garde musician. He has also performed under the names Takeshi Fumimoto, Echelon, Dieter Bohlen, and dieb14. After appearing on several compilations documenting the burgeoning Viennese avant-garde scene of the late 1990s, he released his first solo album in 2000. He has gone on to perform in a number of collaborations with other notable performers, including Burkhard Stangl, erikm, Mats Gustafsson and the John Butcher Group.

== Discography ==
=== Solo works ===
- Contemplations On The Cognitive Loudness Of The 4th Reich'n'Roll, 10" hand-cut vinyl (GOD 2019)
- trick17 12" colored vinyl (Corvo 2013)
- t-series, 13 hand-cut LPs (2013)
- u-series 2008, a series of unique 7" vinyl flexi-disks (2008)
- Dieb13 vs. Takeshi Fumimoto, 12" vinyl picture disc (Mego, June 2005)
- Restructuring (Charhizma, 2000)

=== Collaborations ===
- Jardin Des Bruits - with Burkhard Stangl (Mikroton 2019)
- Scuba - with Angélica Castelló, Billy Roisz and Burkhard Stangl, (Mikroton, 2014)
- (fake) the facts - with Martin Siewert and Mats Gustafsson (editions mego 2011)
- Jazz på Svenska - with Swedish azz (Not Two, 2010)
- Somethingtobesaid - with John Butcher Group (2009)
- (c)haos (ɔ)lub - with erikM (Erstwhile, 2007)
- Condenser - with Tomas Korber and erikM (Absurd, 2005)
- Zirkadia - with Tomas Korber and Jason Kahn (1.8 Sec Records, 2005)
- Eh - with Burkhard Stangl (Erstwhile, 2002)
- Streaming - with Günter Müller and Jason Kahn (For4ears, 2002)
- just in case you are bored. so are we. - with Martin Siewert and Pure (Doc, 2002)
- grain - with efzeg (durian 2000)

=== Compilations ===
- Klingt.org: 10 Jahre Bessere Farben, 2CDs (Mikroton, 2009)
- Turntable Solos (Amoebic 1999)
