= Polwechsel =

- Origin: Vienna, Austria
- Genres: experimental
- Years active: 1993–present
- Labels: Erstwhile Records, HatOLOGY
- Members: Werner Dafeldecker; Michael Moser; Martin Brandlmayr; Burkhard Beins
- Past members: Radu Malfatti; Burkhard Stangl; John Butcher
- Website: www.polwechsel.com

Polwechsel is a musical group founded in Vienna, Austria in 1993.

Their music has mostly straddled a line between contemporary music and free improvisation, and is characterized by quiet volume, sustained drones, and slowly developing structures.

The group was originally composed of double bassist Werner Dafeldecker, cellist Michael Moser, trombonist Radu Malfatti and guitarist Burkhard Stangl. Their name came from a voltage adapter Dafeldecker and Moser found in a second-hand shop.

An appearance at the 1996 LMC Festival in London garnered the group much attention.

Malfatti left in 1997, and was replaced by saxophonist John Butcher. With guitarist/laptop computer whiz Fennesz, this lineup recorded Wrapped Islands, which earned several positive reviews

In around 2004, percussionists Burkhard Beins and Martin Brandlmayr joined Polwechsel. In 2008, Burkhard Stangl left the band and John Butcher also exited in 2009 leaving Polwechsel as a quartet.

== Discography ==
- (1995) Polwechsel – HatOLOGY
- (1999) Polwechsel 2 – HatOLOGY
- (2001) Polwechsel 3 – Durian Records
- (2002) Wrapped Islands (with Christian Fennesz) – Erstwhile Records
- (2006) Archives Of The North – HatOLOGY
- (2009) Field (with John Tilbury) – HatOLOGY
- (2013) Traces Of Wood - HatOLOGY
- (2015) Untitled (No7) - God Records
- (2020) Unseen (with Klaus Lang) - ezz-thetics
- (2023) Embrace - Ni Vu Ni Connu
