= ERikm =

eRikm
- Born: 1970 (age 54–55); France
- Genres: Sound
- Occupation(s): Composer, musician, visual artist
- Instrument(s): Sound artist, concrete music, Electronics
- Years active: 199@–present
- Labels: Relative Pitch Records, Sonoris, Erstwhile Records, hatOLOGY, Room40, Mikroton Recordings, Planam, Monotype Records
- Website: erikm.com

eRikm is a French musician, composer and visual artist who has been active in art since 1992. He is noted for his work with turntables.

He is most well known for his improvisational collaborations. Notable collaborators include: Luc Ferrari, Christian Marclay, Dieb13, Otomo Yoshihide, Mathilde Monnier, Les percussions de Strasbourg, and FM Einheit.

Since 1997, on his own or with collaborators, eRikm has toured (with 5-7 on-tour projects to date), and created by-request specific pieces.

== Main works ==
=== Solo Album & composition ===
- 1999 : Zygosis - Sonoris
- 1999 : Frame - Metamkine
- 2001 : MonO FaCe MirRor - Sonoris
- 2006 : Sixperiodes - Sirr records
- 2007 : Variations Opportunistes - Label Ronda
- 2008 : Steme - Room 40
- 2010 : Lux Payllettes - Entr'acte
- 2011 : Visitation echoing Presque Rien 2 de Luc Ferrari - Alga Marghen
- 2012 : Austral - D'autres cordes records
- 2012 : Transfall - Room 40
- 2015 : Select archive I - L’Art de la fuite - Sonoris
- 2016 : Doubse Hystérie - Monotype records
- 2018 : Drum-Machines for Les Percussions de Strasbourg - PDS
- 2018 : Flow - bandcamp
- 2018 : Mistpouffers - Empreintes Digitales
- 2022 : Echoplasme for HANATSUmiroir - Bisou Records
- 2023 : Fata Morgana for Ensemble Dedalus - Relative Pitch Records
- 2023 : Douze Horizons – Ouïe/Dire

=== Collaboration ===
- 2004 : Archives Sauvées des Eaux with Luc Ferrari - Angle Records
- 2004 : Complementary contrasts with Christian Fennesz - Hat-Hut
- 2005 : Trace cuts with Otomo Yoshihide & Martin Tetreault - Musica gênera

=== Re-organisation & re-composition ===
- 2003 : What a wonderful world with Jérôme Noetinger - Erstwhile Records
- 2007 : ©haos ©lub with Dieb13 - Erstwhile Records
- 2012 : Cartouche with Natacha Muslera - Monotype records
- 2014 : Ecotone with Martin Brandlmayr - Mikroton Recordings

=== Poire_Z ===
- Andy Guhl, eRikm, Günter Müller, Norbert Möslang
- 1999 : Poire Z - For4ears records
- 2001 : Presque_Chic - Sonoris
- 2002 : +, with Otomo Yoshihide • Sachiko M • Christian Marclay - Erstwhile Records
- 2004 : Q, with Phil Minton - For4ears records

=== Post Poire_Z ===
- 2004 : Why Not Béchamel with Erikm + Günter Müller + Toshimaru Nakamura - Mikroton Recordings
- 2011 : Stodgy eRikm & Norbert Möslang - Mikroton Recordings
- 2016 : Pavillon du Lac with Günter Müller + Norbert Möslang + ErikM - Dolmen
