= Duos for Doris =

Studio album by Keith Rowe and John Tilbury
- Released: 29 April 2003
- Recorded: 7 January 2003
- Studio: CCAM, Vandœuvre-lès-Nancy, France
- Genre: Electroacoustic improvisation
- Length: 2:13:15
- Label: Erstwhile

Keith Rowe chronology
Rabbit Run (2003)	Duos for Doris (2003)	A View from the Window (2004)

John Tilbury chronology
Another Part of the Story (2002)	Duos for Doris (2003)	Discrete Moments (2004)

Duos for Doris is a collaborative studio album by Keith Rowe and John Tilbury. It was released on 29 April 2003, through Erstwhile Records. The album is dedicated to Tilbury's mother, Doris, who died days before the album was recorded on 7 January 2003. Duos for Doris is a part of the genre electroacoustic improvisation (EAI), and is composed of three lengthy tracks. It has been regarded as one of the best releases in EAI, and has received positive reviews from AllMusic and Pitchfork.

== Background, recording, and release ==
Upon working on Duos for Doris, Keith Rowe and John Tilbury had worked together for over forty years, particularly in the group AMM. Despite that, this was the first time Rowe collaborated with Tilbury only. The album was recorded on 7 January 2003, at Studio CCAM in Vandœuvre-lès-Nancy, where two out of the three hours recorded were chosen to be published. Duos for Doris was released on 29 April 2003, through Erstwhile Records, on CD. It is dedicated to Tilbury's mother, Doris, who died from a stroke two days before the album's recording. She was ninety-five years old upon death. The duo would release an album in 2011, titled E.E. Tension and Circumstance, which was dedicated to Rowe's deceased mother.

The cover of Duos for Doris is a painting by Rowe akin to the works of the painter L. S. Lowry, who was Doris's favourite painter. According to Lutz Eitel, the hat and legs depicted on the cover is a homage to Ben Hartley, Rowe's tutor for painting. In the liner notes, Rowe, who is known for his improvisations, writes that he believes the term improvisation ought to be changed because "what is far more crucial is being aware of the decisive moment". Furthermore, Rowe discusses the act of not listening to Tilbury's instruments during recording, regarding it as "about the intensification of the edge, or frame".

== Composition ==
Duos for Doris is an electroacoustic improvisation (EAI) record mainly composed from guitars, shortwave radio, and prepared pianos. In the record, Rowe plays the guitar and electronics while Tilbury plays the piano. The guitar, played in an unconventional method, as Stylus describes is "a beautiful growl of magnetic interference and feedback punctured by ethereal knocks and groans". Duos for Doris contains three tracks: "Cathnor", "Olaf", and "Oxleay" in order, all around one hour and ten minutes, forty-five minutes, and seventeen minutes long respectively. In "Cathnor", it has slight sounds of tapping and scraping along with melancholic chords similar to the composer Morton Feldman. "Olaf" features the prepared piano, more clear sounds of radio, and Tilbury tapping on his piano. In the final track, "Oxleay", strings and higher piano keys are played alongside low hums from Rowe. Near the end of it, the keys get higher, which AllMusic would describe as "creating music of such fragility and grace".

== Reception ==
Professional ratings
Review scores
Source	Rating
AllMusic	5/5 stars
The Penguin Guide to Jazz on CD	4/4 stars
Pitchfork	7.8/10
Stylus	A+

Duos for Doris has been considered as one of the best releases of EAI. The Wire listed Duos for Doris as one of the best improvisation releases for 2003. The Penguin Guide to Jazz on CD gave it a perfect score out of four stars, highlighting the duo's sounds and the track "Cathnor". Joe Panzner for Stylus praised it as one of the finest releases in EAI for its challengingness. Brian Olewnick from AllMusic scored it perfect out of five stars, naming it "simply one of the finest albums one is ever likely to hear". Olewnick highlighted one of the final parts in the album as an example of segments adding to "an achievement of surpassing beauty". A Pitchfork review by Andy Beta described the overall sound as: "It's as there or not there as you want it to be, which is something to think about when people are—physically, at least—no longer with you." In a Dusted review, Matt Wellins wrote: "Duos for Doris seems even more purposeful and conscious than their other work". Wellins also regards it as a "private side note" to the work of AMM.

== Track listing ==
No.	Title	Length
1.	"Cathnor"	1:10:14
2.	"Olaf"	45:32
3.	"Oxleay"	17:29
Total length:		2:13:15

== Personnel ==
Credits adapted from AllMusic and Bandcamp.

- Keith Rowe – guitar, electronics, cover art
- John Tilbury – piano
- François Dietz – sound engineering
- Friederike Paetzold – design
- John E. Abbey – production
