= Norbert Möslang =

- Born: October 6, 1952 (age 73); St. Gallen; Switzerland
- Genres: free improvisation
- Occupation: Musician
- Instruments: soprano saxophone, double bass, Live-electronic
- Website: moeslang.com

Norbert Möslang (October 6, 1952 in St. Gallen) is a Swiss musician in the field of free improvisation (soprano saxophone, double bass, Live electronic music) and luthier.

== Life and works ==
The first instrument, which Möslang learned to play was piano. Then, he learned soprano saxophone and contrabass clarinet by self study. From 1972, he worked with Andy Guhl in a duet for 30 years. Since 1984, they have been both in the duet Voice Crack. With eRikm and Günter Müller, the duet expanded to the ensemble poire_z.

He has performed also with Barbetomagus, Jim O’Rourke, Otomo Yoshihide, Keith Rowe, Carlos Zingaro, Irène Schweizer, Kurt Liedwart and Jason Kahn. He composes also film music. He won the Swiss Film Award in 2010 for the music he composed for Peter Liechti's documentary film the Hummings of Insects.
