= Burkhard Stangl =

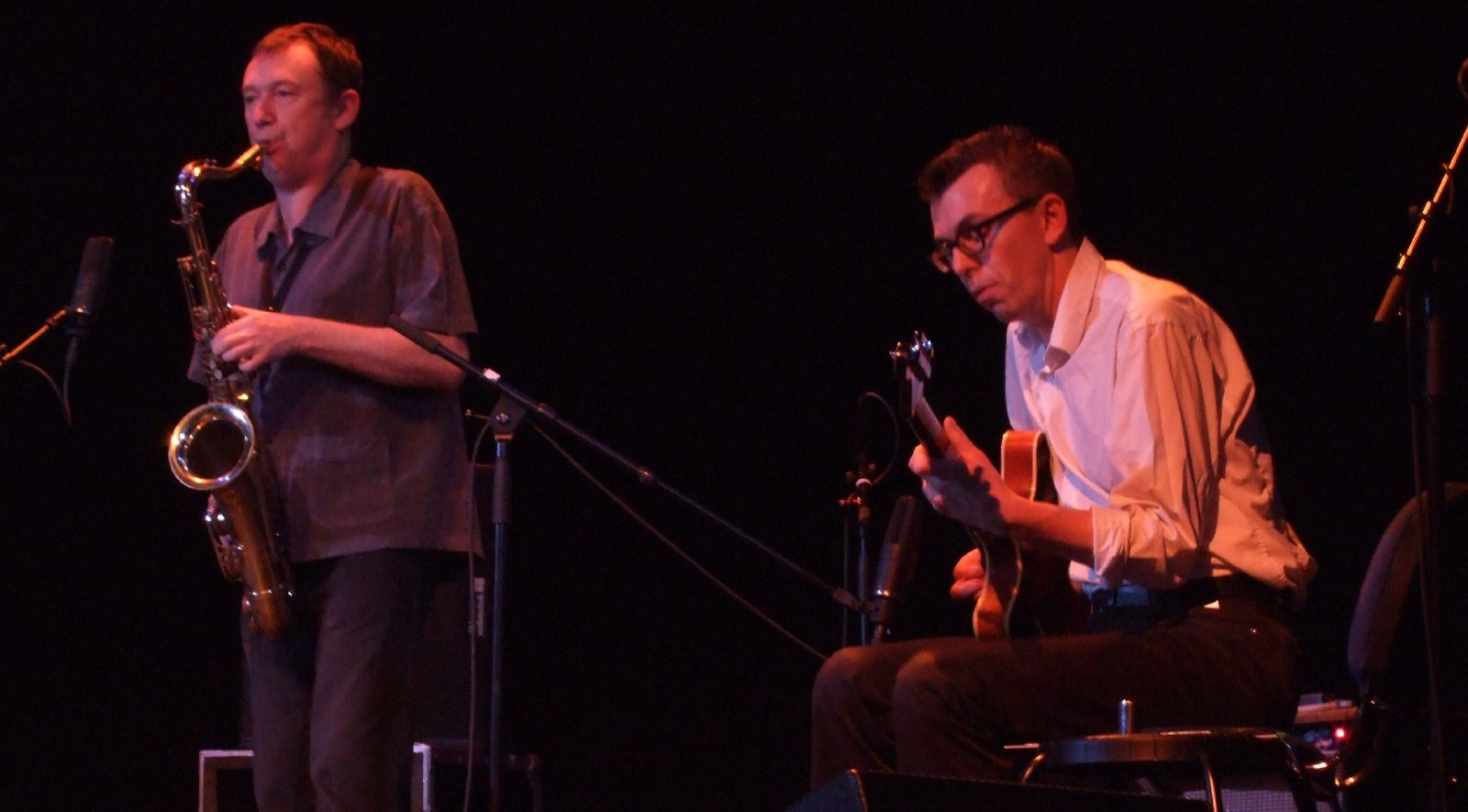
- John Butcher and Burkhard Stangl

Background information
- Born: Burkhard Stangl
- Genres: Free improvisation, Electro-acoustic Improvisation
- Instruments: Guitar, Electronics
- Years active: 1985-current
- Label: Erstwhile Records
- Formerly of: Polwechsel

Burkhard Stangl (born 6 November 1960 in Eggenburg, Lower Austria) is a composer and musician, currently residing in Vienna, Austria. Playing primarily guitar and electronics, he is a prolific performer in the world of electro-acoustic improvisation, having participated in over 50 recordings. One of his most noted recordings is schnee, a duet with Cristof Kurzmann, inspired by four films and a quote from writer Robert Walser. It has been recorded live, as schnee_live, and has spawned a similarly themed "meta-song suite," neuschnee. His 1997 opera Der Venusmond was recorded partially on the observation deck of the Empire State Building.

== Partial discography ==
- Recital (Durian, 1999)
- Schnee - with Cristof Kurmann, (Erstwhile, 2000)
- Venusmond - with Oswald Eggers, (Quell, 2000)
- An Old Fashioned Duet - with Taku Sugimoto, (Slub, 2002)
- Eh - with Dieb13, (Erstwhile, 2002)
- Neuschnee - with Cristof Kurzmann (Erstpop, 2009)
- Musik - Ein Porträt in Sehnsucht - with Kai Fagaschinski, (Erstwhile, 2009)
- Scuba - with Angélica Castelló, Billy Roisz and Dieb13, (Mikroton, 2014)
- Sqid - with Angélica Castelló, Mario De Vega and Attila Faravelli (Mikroton, 2015)
- Jardin Des Bruits - with Dieb13, (Mikroton, 2019)

With Steve Lacy

- Itinerary (hat ART, 1991)

With Franz Koglmann

- L'Heure Bleue (HatART, 1991)
- We Thought About Duke (HatART, 1994) with Lee Konitz
