= Marcus Schmickler =

German composer, musician, and producer (born 1968)

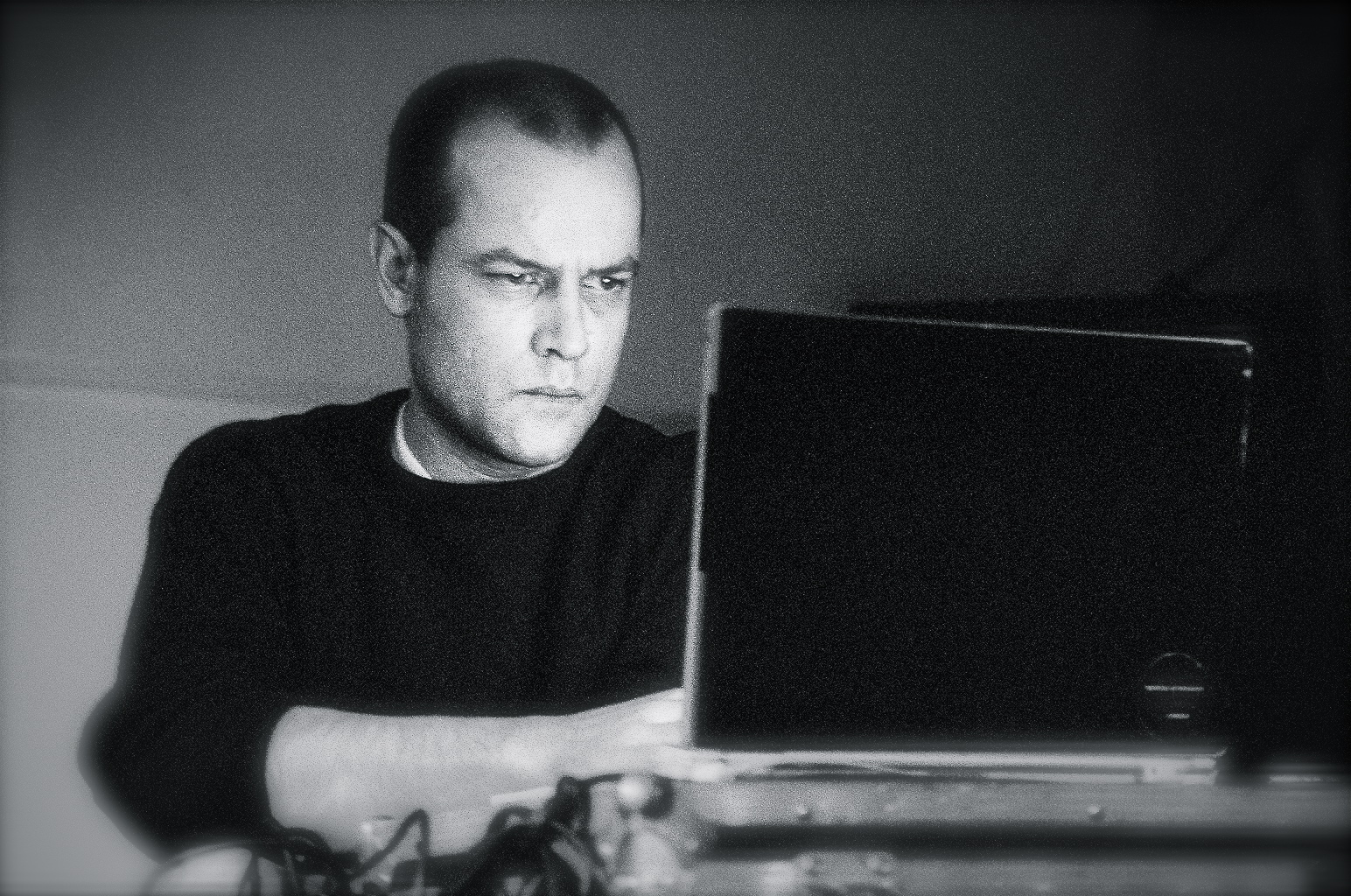

Background information
- Also known as: Pluramon
- Born: Marcus Schmickler; November 15, 1968 (age 57); Cologne, Germany
- Origin: Cologne, Germany
- Genres: Contemporary classical music, Computer music, Postmodernism, New Complexity, New Simplicity
- Occupations: composer, producer
- Labels: A-Musik, Mille Plateaux, Editions Mego
- Website: www.piethopraxis.org

Marcus Schmickler (born November 15, 1968, in Cologne) is a German composer, musician, and producer. His music was also published under the Pluramon moniker.

== Background ==
Schmickler merges computer music, ensemble composition, performance and scientific subjects. His multi-channel works have been performed internationally, creating unique auditory spaces. He explores techniques like Shepard tones and ring modulations, deepening his compositions through data sonification and otoacoustic emissions.

In 1991, after spending a year in London, he started studying musicology at Cologne University and electronic music and composition Hochschule für Musik und Tanz Köln with H.U. Humpert and Johannes Fritsch. The same year he became a member of the seminal collective Kontakta. 1992 his first solo release appeared with the French label Odd Size. In 1995, he was co-initiator of the DJ collective Brüsseler-Platz-10a-Musik, together with Georg Odijk and Jan St. Werner, associated with the A-Musik record store and label.

Since 1995 he works as a composer, for film theater and radio play. In 1996 he released one of the first fully digitally produced post-rock albums under the pseudonym Pluramon on the German label Mille Plateaux. In 1998, he became a member of the 12-piece electro-acoustic ensemble MIMEO (Music in Movement Electronic Orchestra). In 1999, he completed his diploma in electronic music with Hans Ulrich Humpert and the composition with Johannes Fritsch with a thesis on Gottfried Michael Koenig.

In 2000 he published jointly with Thomas Lehn the CD Bart, which was reviewed to be one of the most impressive synth-improv performances ever. In September 2001 he recorded the Pluramon album Dreams Top Rock with American singer Julee Cruise and went on an extended tour through South America on the initiative of Goethe-Institut in 2003. Since 2004 he has been working on theater projects, with Felix Ensslin. He created numerous works of electronic music, and compositions for choir, chamber ensemble, and orchestra. In 2009 he composed Bonn Patternizationon on behalf of the International Year of Astronomy 2009 and the German Music Council, a sonification with projections based on astrophysical data. Since 2015, Schmickler has worked as faculty at Bard College in Annandale-On-Hudson, at California Institute of the Arts in Los Angeles County, at Robert-Schumann Hochschule Institute For Music and Media in Düsseldorf and at Institut für Elektronische Musik und Akustik (IEM) der Universität für Musik und darstellende Kunst Graz. In 2016 he collaborated with Gerhard Richter and Corinna Belz and Ensemble Musikfabrik on Richters Patterns, a chamber-music concerto with film based on a painting by Richter. In 2022 he premiered Entwurf einer Rheinlandschaft, a large scale, long-distance performance for 60 musicians across the Rhine.

Marcus Schmickler has received prizes and scholarships, including the Rome Prize of the German Academy Villa Massimo, Ars Electronica, from the state of North Rhine-Westphalia and curated festival programs in the Academy of Arts, Berlin and the ZKM. He was a longtime member of the jury of the Deutscher Musikrat (German Music Council, a member of the International Music Council). As an author, he wrote articles on various topics of electronic music.

== Partial discography ==
- Solo
  - Bonner Durchmusterung, etat, 2024
  - Sky Dice / Mapping the Studio, editions Mego, 2021
  - Richters Patterns, Tochnit Aleph, 2020
  - Particle/Matter-Wave/Energy, Kompakt, 2019
  - Rule of Inference, a-Musik, 2011
  - Bari Workshop, Presto?!, 2011
  - Palace of Marvels [queered pitch], Editions Mego, 2010
  - Altars of Science, Editions Mego, 2007
  - DEMOS for Choir, a-Musik, 2005
  - Param, a-Musik, 2001
  - Sator Rotas, a-Musik, 1999
  - Wabi Sabi, a-Musik, 1996
  - Onea Gako, Odd Size, 1993
- As Pluramon
  - The Monstrous Surplus, Karaoke Kalk, 2007
  - Dreams Top Rock, Karaoke Kalk, 2003
  - Bitsand Riders, Mille Plateaux, 2000
  - Render Bandits, Mille Plateaux, 1998
  - Pickup Canyon, Mille Plateaux, 1996
- With MIMEO
  - Wigry, Bolt Records, 2011
  - Sight, Cathnor, 2008
  - Lifting Concrete Lightly, Serpentine Gallery, 2004
  - The Hands of Caravaggio, Erstwhile Records, 2001
  - Electric Table & Chair, Grob, 2000
- Collaborations
  - Marcus Schmickler/Jaki Liebezeit / Hayden Chisholm "Timekeepers II", a-Musik, 2023
  - Marcus Schmicker/Thomas Lehn "Neue Bilder", Mikroton Recordings, 2017
  - Marcus Schmickler John Tilbury "Timekeepers", A-Musik, 2015
  - Marcus Schmickler Julian Rohrhuber "Politiken der Frequenz", Tochnit Aleph / Editions Mego, 2014
  - Marcus Schmickler/Thomas Lehn Live Double Séance [Antaa Kalojen Uida], Editions Mego, 2011
  - R/S USA, Pan, 2011
  - Schmickler/Gratkowski/Nabatov Deployment, Leo Records, 2010
  - Marcus Schmickler/Thomas Lehn Navigation im Hypertext, a-Musik, 2008
  - Marcus Schmickler/Thomas Lehn Kölner Kranz, a-Musik, 2008
  - R/S One(snow mud rain), Erstwhile Records, 2007
  - Marcus Schmickler with Hayden Chisholm Amazing Daze, Häpna, 2007
  - Marc Ushmi Doshhammer Mixes (without Label), 2007
  - Claudio Bohorquez, Solo and Accompaniment, Aulos, 2006
  - Marcus Schmickler/John Tilbury Variety, a-Musik, 2005
  - Schmickler/Lehn/Rowe/Nakamura Untitled, Erstwhile Records, 2004
  - Schmickler/Lehn Amplify Balance 7 CD Box, Erstwhile Records, 2004
  - Marcus Schmickler/Thomas Lehn / Keith Rowe Rabbit Run, Erstwhile Records, 2003
  - Marc Ushmi meets Reverend Galloway Mein Kopf verlor ein Dach, Whatness, 2003
  - Soundcultures, Suhrkamp, 2003
  - Marc Ushmi/Thomas Brinkmann Chevrolet Corvette Max Ernst, 2001
  - Marcus Schmickler/Thomas Lehn Bart, Erstwhile Records, 2000
  - 2:3 Oswald Wiener zum 65. Geburtstag, Supposé, 2000
  - Prix Ars Electronica Cyber Arts 2000 Ars Electronica Center, 2000
  - Brüsseler Platz-10a-Musik Wittener Tage für neue Kammermusik, WDR, 1998
  - Brüsseler Platz-10a-Musik sT, Sieben, 1997
  - Brüsseler Platz-10a-Musik / Agentur Bilwet 1000 Fehler, Supposé, 1996
  - Pol Baby I Will Make You Sweat Odd Size, 1995
  - Pol Transomuba, Odd Size, 1994
  - Kontakta s/T, Odd Size, 1992
