= Lou Gare =

British jazz saxophonist (1939–2017)

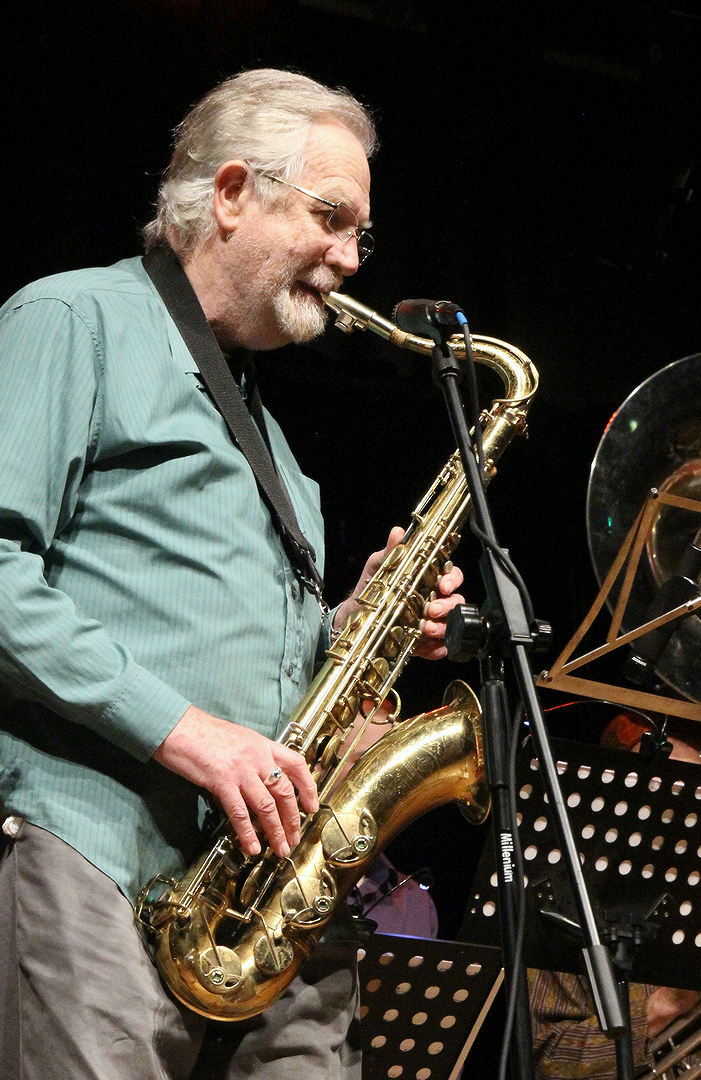
- Gare with Mike Westbrook's Uncommon Orchestra in "A Bigger Show" at the Barnfield Theatre, Exeter, England

Background information
- Born: Leslie Arthur Gare; 16 June 1939; Rugby, Warwickshire, England
- Died: 6 October 2017 (aged 78) Exeter, Devon, England
- Genres: Free jazz
- Instrument: Tenor saxophone
- Label: Mainstream

Leslie Arthur "Lou" Gare (16 June 1939 – 6 October 2017) was a British free-jazz saxophonist born in Rugby, Warwickshire, England, perhaps best known for his works with the improvised music ensemble AMM and playing with musicians such as Eddie Prévost, Mike Westbrook, Cornelius Cardew, Keith Rowe and Sam Richards.

== Discography ==
=== With AMM ===
- At the Roundhouse (Anomalous)
- AMM Group of London (Mainstream)
- To Hear And Back Again (Matchless)
- Cornelius Cardew Memorial Concert (Impetus)
- The Crypt - 12 June 1968 (Matchless)
- "The Aarhus Sequences", disc one of LAMINAL, a three CD retrospective AMM set (Matchless)

=== Other than with AMM ===
- Saxophony Horn-Bill, reed solos compilation 2005 (incl. John Butcher, Natahaniel Catchpole, Kai Fagasschinski, Evan Parker and Seymour Wright) (Matchless)
- No Strings Attached, solo saxophone 2005 (Matchless)

== Bibliography ==
- *Carr, Ian; Fairweather, Digby; Priestley, Brian, "Jazz: The Rough Guide" (1995), Penguin, ISBN 1-85828-137-7.
