= Burkhard Beins =

German composer/performer

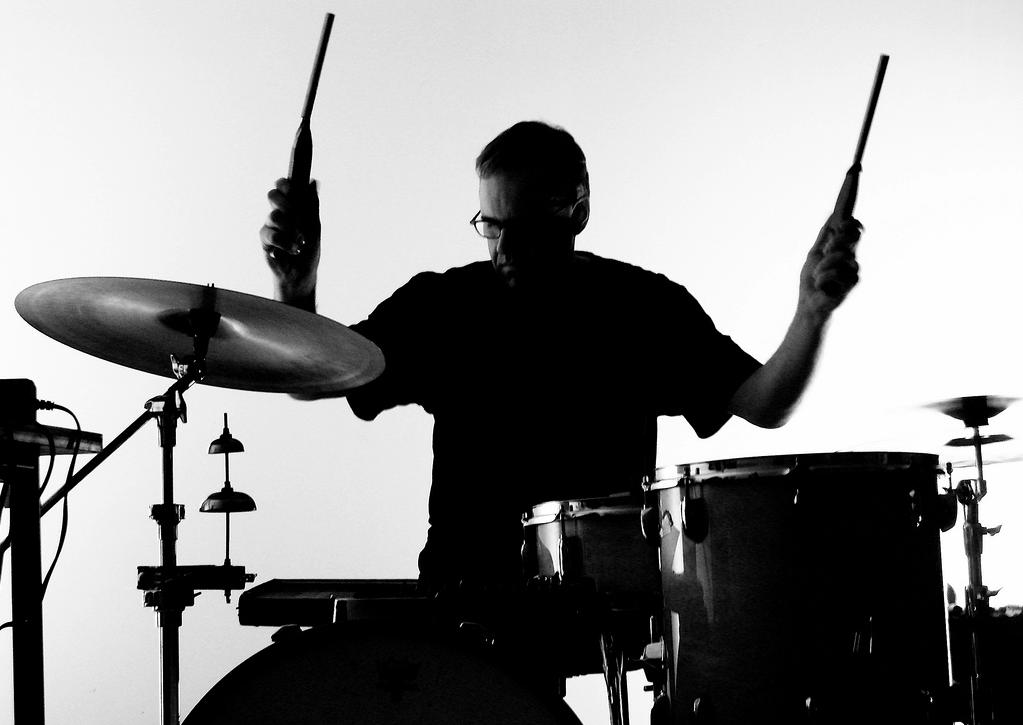
Burkhard Beins

Burkhard Beins (born 1964 in Lower Saxony, West Germany) is a German composer/performer who works with percussion, selected objects and electronics. Living in Berlin since 1995, Beins is active in experimental music and electroacoustic improvisation. Since the late 1980s he has appeared on international festivals, concerts and tours throughout Europe and overseas. He is a member of several ensembles including Perlonex, Activity Center, Polwechsel, Trio Sowari, Phosphor, The Sealed Knot and BBB. He also works with Keith Rowe, Sven-Åke Johansson, John Tilbury, Charlemagne Palestine and many others. At the same time, he is active in the area of sound installation. He has released more than 30 CDs and LPs on labels including 2:13 Music, Zarek, Erstwhile Records, Hat Hut, Potlatch, Mikroton Recordings, Absinth and Confront. His first solo CD, Disco Prova, was released in 2007, followed by Structural Drift, both combining field recordings, percussion material and electronic devices with digital multitracking.

== Selected discography ==
- Nunc (2:13 Music CD oo2, 1996)
- Yarbles (Hatology 510, CD 1997)
- Activity Center: Möwen & Moos (2:13 Music CD oo8/oo9, 1999, limited edition)
- Burkhard Beins/John Bisset: Chapel (2:13 Music CD o12, 2001)
- Burkhard Beins/Keith Rowe: Grain (CD, Zarek 06, 2001)
- Perlonex: Peripherique (CD, Zarek 07, 2001)
- Phosphor (Potlatch P501 CD, 2002)
- Burkhard Beins/Andrea Neumann: Lidingö (Erstwhile CD o26, 2002)
- The Sealed Knot: Surface/Plane (Meniscus CD o12, 2003)
- Beins/Johansson: Santa Fé (...im Raumschiff Zitrone Berlin) (LP, Eventuell 02, 2003)
- Beins/Marwedel/Vorfeld: Misiiki (Rossbin CD o13, 2003)
- Berlin Drums - 4 Solos: Beins/Buck/Heather/Schaefer (4 x 3" CDR, Absinth, 2004)
- The Sealed Knot: Unwanted Object (Confront Collectors Series 1, CD 2004)
- Keith Rowe/Burkhard Beins: Live at Amplify (ErstLive oo1, CD 2004)
- Activity Center & Phil Minton (Absinth Records, CD 2005)
- Trio Sowari: Three Dances (Potlatch CD 105, 2005)
- Baghdassarians/Baltschun/Beins (Absinth Records, CD 2006)
- Polwechsel: Archives of the North (Hat Hut, CD 2006)
- Perlonex. Tensions w/Keith Rowe + Charlemagne Palestine (Nexsound 2CD, 2006)
- Burkhard Beins: Disco Prova (Absinth, CD 2007)
- Trio Sowari: shortcut (Potlatch, CD 2008)
- Perlonex & Charlemagne Palestine: It Ain't Necessarily So (Zarek 2CD, 2009)
- Polwechsel & John Tilbury: Field (Hat Hut, CD 2009)
- Phosphor II (Potlatch CD, 2009)
- Burkhard Beins: Structural Drift (Künstlerhäuser Worpswede CD, 2009)
- Beins, Capece, Davies, Nakamura: SLW (Org. Music from Thessaloniki CD, 2009)
- Activity Center: Lohn & Brot (Absinth CD, 2010)
