= Peter Liechti =

Swiss film director (1951–2014)

- Born: 8 January 1951; St. Gallen, Switzerland
- Died: 4 April 2014 (aged 63); Zürich, Switzerland
- Occupation: Filmmaker
- Years active: 1984–2013

Peter Liechti (8 January 1951 – 4 April 2014) was a Swiss movie director. He directed over 100 Swiss-German movies. He was nominated for many awards. Most of his movies were shown at the Berlin International Film Festival (BIFF) and was awarded an honorary award at the BIFF in 2013.

After graduating from high school Liechti initially began studying medicine. He earned a diploma as an art teacher from the Zurich University of the Arts and also studied art history at the University of Zurich.

From 1981 to 1982 Liechti lived on Crete where he worked as a painted and writer. In the early 1980s he began experimenting with filmmaking, and in 1985 he was one of the co-founders of the arthouse cinema KinoK in his hometown of St. Gallen.

In 1986 Liechti began working as a freelance screenwriter, director, cameraman and producer on a variety of arthouse productions. His filmography included only one feature film (Martha's Garden, 1997) as most of his works were documentaries, essays, and experimental films.

Over the course of his career he made a number of films in collaboration with well-known musicians and artists such as Roman Signer, Norbert Möslang, Fredy Studer and Nam June Paik. From 1988 to 1995 Liechti was also member of the film group Eighties Film in Zürich.

Liechti died in 2014 at the age of 63 from cancer he had suffered for years.

== Selected filmography ==
- 1997: Martha's Garden
- 2003: Lucky Jack: Three Attempts to Stop Smoking
- 2004: Namibia Crossings
- 2006: Hardcore Chambermusic
- 2007: Sweeping Addis
- 2009: The Sound of Insects: Record of a Mummy
- 2013: Father's Garden: The Love of My Parents

== Awards ==
- 2005: Nomination for Swiss Film Award for Best Documentary for Namibia Crossings
- 2009: European Film Award for Best Documentary for The Sound of Insects: Record of a Mummy
- 2010: Culture Prize of the City of St. Gallen
- 2014: Swiss Film Award for Best Documentary for Father's Garden: The Love of My Parents
