= Spontaneous Music Ensemble =

Free improvising musician ensemble

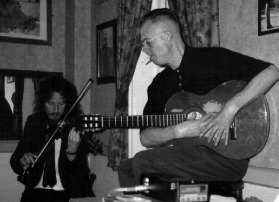
The SME playing in Islington, London, 1991. Roger Smith plays guitar and Nigel Coombes plays violin. John Stevens plays drums and cornet out of frame.

The Spontaneous Music Ensemble (SME) was a loose collection of free improvising musicians, convened in 1965 by the late South London-based jazz drummer/trumpeter John Stevens and alto and soprano saxophonist Trevor Watts. SME performances and recordings could range from Stevens–Watts duos to gatherings of more than a dozen players.

== Ethos ==
As critic Brian Olewnick writes, the SME emphasised an "extremely open, leaderless aspect where a premium was placed on careful and considered listening on the part of the musicians. Saxophonist Evan Parker observed that Stevens had two basic rules: (1) If you can't hear another musician, you're playing too loud, and (2) if the music you're producing doesn't regularly relate to what you're hearing others create, why be in the group? This led to the development of what would jocularly become known as 'insect improv' – music that tended to be very quiet, very intense, arrhythmic, and by and large atonal."

== History ==
The SME began an intensive six nights per week residency at the Little Theatre Club in London in January 1966 and recorded their first album Challenge the following month.

One can loosely divide the group's history into two periods: the more horn-oriented earlier ensembles (typically with some combination of Watts, saxophonist Evan Parker and trumpeter Kenny Wheeler), and the later string-based ensembles with guitarist Roger Smith (who became as central to the second edition of SME as Watts was to the first) and violinist Nigel Coombes. The transitional point is the quartet album Biosystem (Incus, 1977), which also featured cellist Colin Wood.

Countless other musicians passed through the SME over the years, including Derek Bailey, Paul Rutherford, Maggie Nichols, Dave Holland, Barry Guy, Peter Kowald and Kent Carter. The final edition of the group was a trio of Stevens, Smith, and the saxophonist John Butcher, a configuration documented on A New Distance (1994).

Inspired both by American free jazz and by the radical, abstract music of AMM, as well as influences as diverse as Anton Webern and Samuel Beckett (two Stevens touchstones), the SME kept at least a measure of jazz in their sound, though this became less audible in the later "string" ensembles.

Stevens' death in 1994 brought an end to the SME.

== Discography ==
  - 1966 - Challenge - Eyemark Records (Kenny Wheeler, Paul Rutherford, Trevor Watts, Bruce Cale, Jeff Clyne, John Stevens, Evan Parker, Chris Cambridge) (1966 - Emanem Records)
  - 1966-67 - Withdrawal - Emanem Records (1997) (Trevo Watts, John Stevens, Derek Bailey, Barry Guy)
  - 1967 - Summer 1967 - Emanem Records (1995) (Evan Parker, John Stevens, Peter Kowald)
  - 1968 - Karyobin - Island Records (John Stevens, Evan Parker, Kenny Wheeler, Derek Bailey, Dave Holland) (1993 - Chronoscope)
  - 1968-71-73 - Frameworks - Emanem Records (2007) (Stevens, Norma Winstone, Trevor Watts, Kenny Wheeler, Paul Rutherford, Julie Tippetts, Ron Herman)
  - 1969 - John Stevens/Spontaneous Music Ensemble - Marmalade Records (John Stevens, Kenny Wheeler, Derek Bailey, Trevor Watts, Peter Lemer, Johnny Dyani, Maggie Nichols, Carolann Nichols, Pepi Lemer)
  - 1970 - For You To Share - Emanem Records
  - 1970.11 - The Source – From and Towards - Tangent Records (Trevor Watts, Ray Warleigh, Brian Smith, Ken Wheeler, Bob Norden, Chris Pyne, Mick Pyne, Ron Mathewson, Marcio Mattos, John Stevens)
  - 1971 - So What Do You Think? - Tangent Records (John Stevens, Trevor Watts, Kenny Wheeler, Derek Bailey, Dave Holland)
  - 1971 - Birds of a Feather - BYG Records (John Stevens, Trevor Watts, Ron Herman, Julie Tippetts [Driscoll])
  - 1971 - Bobby Bradford, John Stevens and the Spontaneous Music Ensemble Live Vols. 1 & 2 - Nessa Records
  - 1971 - 1.2. Albert Ayler - Affinity (John Stevens, Trevor Watts, Ron Herman, Julie Tippetts)
  - 192-773 - Bare Essentials - Emanem Records (2xCD) (2007) (John Stevens, Trevor Watts)
  - 1973 - Face to Face - Emanem Records (John Stevens, Trevor Watts)
  - 1973–74 - Quintessence - Emanem Records (John Stevens, Trevor Watts, Evan Parker, Derek Bailey, Kent Carter)
  - 1977 - Biosystem - Incus Records (John Stevens, Nigel Coombes, Roger Smith, Colin Wood) (2006 - Psi Records)
  - 1977-88 - Low Profile - Emanem Records (1999) (John Stevens, Nigel Coombes, Roger Smith, Colin Wood)
  - 1980/91 - Hot and Cold Heroes - Emanem Records (1996) (John Stevens, Nigel Coombes, Roger Smith)
  - 1981 - SME + SMO_In Concert - Sweet Follk And Country (1982) (SME: John Stevens, Roger Smith, Nigel Coombes) + (Jon Corbett, Lol Coxhill, Trevor Watts, Paul Rutherford, Colin Wood, Maggie Nichols) (2008 - Emanem as part of Trio & triangle cd)
  - 1994 - A New Distance - Acta (1995) (John Stevens, John Butcher, Roger Smith) (2005 - Emanem Records)
