= Alfred Nieman =

British musician

Alfred Nieman (1914 – 7 March 1997) was a British pianist and composer.

== Personal life ==
Alfred Nieman was born in the East End of London in 1914 to Polish and Russian immigrant parents. He started playing piano at the age of seven, and started composing when he was ten. He left school in 1928 at the age of fourteen and got a job playing piano for movies at the silent cinema in order to help support his family. A year later, he won a piano scholarship to attend the Royal Academy of Music, and he remained there for six years. In the 1930s Nieman edited a six penny magazine called "The Student". Nieman married in 1938 and had two sons: Julian, born in 1946, and Paul, born in 1950. In addition to his work as a composer and professor, Nieman was interested in and involved with the National Association for Gifted Children, the Research Into Lost Knowledge Organisation, and the Society for Psychic & Psychological Research.

Alfred Nieman died in Hampstead, London on 7 March 1997.

== Career ==
Prior to World War II, Nieman joined in a piano duo with his contemporary Cimbro Martin, under the name "Merlin and Martyn". During the war the duo replaced Rawicz and Landauer at their engagements when they were interned. Merlin and Martyn was a regular act at The Dorchester Hotel in London. Together they joined the Auxiliary Fire Service during the London Blitz.

Because his health was too poor to be a soldier, during WWII Nieman joined the Entertainments National Service Association (ENSA), which led him to work for the BBC as a performer and arranger. At the BBC, he carried out tasks such as accompanying Noël Coward and standing in for the soloist in a broadcast piano concerto.

In 1947, he left the BBC and took up a professorship for piano and composition at the Guildhall School of Music. There he introduced and pioneered the use of improvisation, largely atonal, as a means of teaching composition. This was revolutionary for its time and the GSM was the only place where such a teaching idea could be found. He remained at the Guildhall School of Music until his retirement.

He also gave evening classes in improvisation at Chiswick and Hampstead in London. Notable students that took his classes included Sam Richards.

Nieman composed extensively and wrote under several pseudonyms, including "Alfred Merlin" and "Robert Legray". Many of his works that he published under pseudonyms were more "commercial". He also ghost wrote music on occasions including some film music credited to Benjamin Britten.

He was consulted as a musical expert in the 1963 copyright law case of Francis, Day & Hunter Ltd v Twentieth Century Fox Corp.

Nieman contributed an essay titled "The Concertos" to Alan Walker's Robert Schumann: The Man and His Music.

Another of his interests was music therapy, of which he said:

"Music faces us with the realisation that there are two worlds: the inner and the outer. The inner is often incommunicable, a spiritual world which is difficult to enter from the outer world where we normally speak to one another. Music is a bridge for us by which we can reach this inner world. That is why this free expression is so vital for music therapy. You are privileged people to be able to communicate with this deepest part of human beings."

== Works ==
Name	Year	Category
Tongs And Bones	1976	Solo
Chromotempera	1971	Duo
Gavotte For A Latin Lady		Duo
Holly And The Ivy, The		Unaccomp. Choral
Lullaby		Solo (Childrens)
Mass		Chorus + Orchestra
Mountain Dance		Duo
Nowelle, Nowelle		Unaccomp. Choral
Rilke Song Cycle		Chamber + Voice(s)
Sailor's Dance		Solo (Childrens)
Sonata for piano no. 2		Solo
Three Expressions		Unaccomp. Choral
Three Songs For Mary		Chamber (3 - 6 players)
At The Wedding		Duo
Three Songs Of Villon		Song (Voice w/wo 1 instr)
Canzona		Chamber (3 - 6 players)
Chamber Sonatas		Chamber (3 - 6 players)
Two Serenades		Solo
Variations And Finale		Solo
Douglaston		Song (Voice w/wo 1 instr)
How goes the night?		Song (Voice w/wo 1 instr)

== Sources ==
- www.alfrednieman.co.uk further information
- https://britishmusiccollection.org.uk/composer/alfred-nieman
