= Sam Richards (writer) =

English writer, composer, and musician

Sam Richards (born 1949 in London), is an English writer, composer, improviser, jazz pianist and former folk music collector and performer. For most of his life he has lived in south Devon. His father was the writer and playwright Allen Saddler (1923–2011).

After studying with Alfred Nieman at the Guildhall School of Music and Drama, and being active in experimental music, he moved to Devon and quickly became involved in the performance and collection of folk music, accumulating some 600 hours of recordings from traditional performers. In the late 1980s his interest returned to avant-garde and experimental music, and he has composed and performed extensively in that genre. He taught at Dartington College of Arts and also at the University of Plymouth until 2018.

His writings include the books "Soundings - All Kinds of Music, A 21st Century Musician's Anthology", "Dartington College of Arts - Learning by Doing", The Engaged Musician, John Cage as... and Sonic Harvest: Towards Musical Democracy; BBC Radios 2 and 3 documentaries including one on the composer Morton Feldman; and articles for Oral History, the Folk Music Journal, fRoots, Contemporary Music Review, Proof, The Wire and the New Statesman.

== Early studies and folk music ==
Richards cites formative influences as Alfred Nieman and Cornelius Cardew. He studied with Nieman at the Guildhall School of Music and Drama. He also took part in experimental music events organised by Cornelius Cardew. In 1968 he moved from the Guildhall to Dartington College of Arts in Devon. He had already studied composition at Dartington Summer School of Music with French avant gardist Michel Decoust.

In the 1970s he was a member of the folk trio Staverton Bridge with Tish Stubbs and Paul Wilson, and later toured the English folk scene as a duo with Tish Stubbs. He devoted much time to folklore research mainly in England's Westcountry, concentrating on gypsies, farming communities and children's songs and tales, writing several papers on these subjects. Sound recordings made by him are held by the British Library Sound Archive, and the Sam Richards Folklore Archive of 600 hours of recordings of song, music and interviews made between 1972 and 1987 is held by the British Library and the University of Plymouth. In 1979 he and Tish Stubbs published The English Folksinger, a collection of folk songs with melodies; it includes a few songs which Richards wrote himself. At this time he was director of the Westcountry Folklore Centre and co-director of People's Stage Tapes, which concentrated on releasing recordings of traditional and revival performers, including a recording of Walter Pardon singing at a folk club in Torquay. From 1982 to at least 1989 he jointly produced with Steve Roud a quarterly newsletter titled "Folk Song Research: A Newsletter for Researchers of Traditional Song".

== Avant garde and jazz ==
After some years specialising in musical anthropology and fieldwork, Richards wrote "Fool's Holiday", a quasi-minimalist score with much opportunity for jazz improvisation. In collaboration with Peter Kiddle of "Theatre of Public Works" this became a theatre/dance piece with references to ritual and folklore. It was performed in England and also in the BritEsch Festival in Luxembourg.

His recent premières include "Kropotkin", a large scale piece for many performers, which was performed on 1 March 2009 as part of the Peninsula Arts Contemporary Music Festival, and "Four Sea Studies" – premièred by the Torbay Symphony Orchestra in 2010. His "Four Drones" was commissioned in 2009 by the Experimental Flute Ensemble and played in various venues around South Devon. Premièred in June 2009, was his "About Time: Voices" at the San Francisco Public Library, performed by the Cornelius Cardew Choir. In 2012 "Vox Populi" was performed at the Totnes Festival and on Soundart Radio. In 2014 a new composition for string players and the marble run at the Bovey Tracey House or Marbles was premiered.

=== Fish Music ===
"Fish Music" was an idea conceived when Richards was a student. Fish swimming in a tank become musical notation by means of a five line musical stave being placed across the glass. String players are instructed to choose a fish and follow its course behind the stave. A revised version in which a team of improvisers with backs turned to the fish respond to the string sound, was premièred by the strings of Ten Tors Orchestra at the National Marine Aquarium, Plymouth in 2008. An updated version for filmed fish, string players and improvising soloists was presented in Plymouth city centre in the summer of 2013, using the city's large outdoor screen for the film of the fish. The filmed fish film was also used in 2015 for the CAM Festival at the Millennium Centre, Cardiff, with five string players and improvisers Lona Kozik, Gorwel Owen and Richards himself.

== Dismissal from Dartington ==
From 2006, Richards was an outspoken opponent of the proposed closure and move to Falmouth of Dartington College of Arts, the last small independent arts college in the UK, where he had taught part-time for 30 years. He was a founder member of the "Save Dartington College Campaign" which existed not only to save the college, but to question the processes and interests which led to its closure. Richards said that "the whole ethos of Dartington can't and won't be transplanted down there. Once you have taken it away from the place where it grew from, it will become something else."

He was suspended from the college over a satirical article he published on the campaign website that criticised the college administration and, in particular, principal Andrew Brewerton. Following a hearing, he was dismissed for gross insubordination, a decision that he appealed against, maintaining that it was unfair and biased against him. The appeal tribunal agreed that if Richards apologised to Brewerton he could be reinstated, giving guidelines as to what the apology should contain. However, the apology he wrote was not accepted by Brewerton and Richards refused to compromise further.

== Current activities ==
Richards worked part-time at the University of Plymouth from the early 1990s to 2018. He now lectures for the Academy Sound and Music in Exeter. He is an improviser and jazz pianist, and played with the improving group Half Moon Assemblage with Lona Kozik, Elie Fruchter and, occasionally, Tim Sayer. He also does regular monthly gigs with the Jazzlab, an experimental band that plays free jazz, electronic/instrumental freeform pieces, and sometimes Richards' own poetry - which has a political edge. As a poet and reader he occasionally participates in local readings and has guested and headlined for many groups. From 2017 to 2019 He was composer and radio programme maker for Sounding Coastal Change, an Open University project funded by the Arts and Humanities Research Council, and focussing on the North Norfolk Coast.

== Publications ==
- The English Folksinger (with Tish Stubbs). Glasgow: Collins (1979) ISBN 0-00-411067-6
- Sonic Harvest: Towards Musical Democracy. Amber Lane Press Ltd (1992) ISBN 1-872868-07-X
- John Cage as.... Amber Lane Press Ltd (1996) ISBN 1-872868-17-7
- The Engaged Musician. CentreHouse Press (2013) ISBN 978-1-902086-06-4
- "Learning by Doing: Dartington College of Arts". Longmarsh Press (2015)
- "Soundings…" University of Plymouth Press (2016)

== Discography ==
- Staverton Bridge – Staverton Bridge (1975). Saydisc SDL 266 (with Paul Wilson & Tish Stubbs). Track listing at AllMusic
- Sam Richards & Tish Stubbs – Invitation to North America, The New World Seen Through English Folk Song (1977). Saydisc
- Sam Richards & Tish Stubbs – The English Folksinger (1979). Transatlantic MTRA 2011
- Sam Richards – Two Old Pianos. Green Ltd.
- Sam Richards – Love Among the Ruins (2002). Green Ltd.

About Time and other works (2020) Whole Note Press
