= Martin Brandlmayr =

Austrian percussionist, drummer, composer and electronic artist

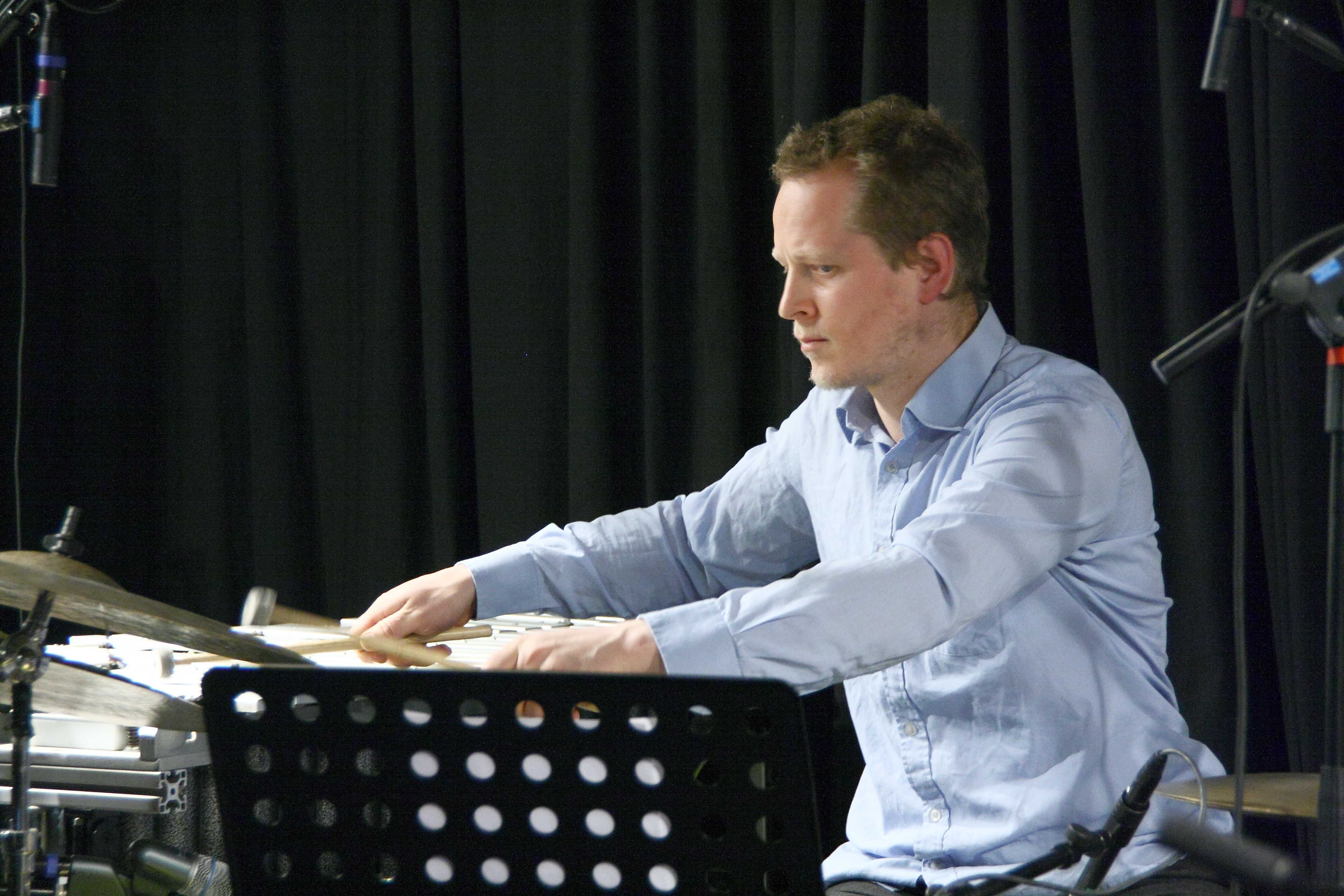
Martin Brandlmayr at a NOW Jazz-concert with Polwechsel at Club W71, Weikersheim

Martin Brandlmayr is an Austrian percussionist, drummer, composer and electronic artist.

He is widely recognized for his work in a variety of so-called "post-rock" bands, namely Radian, Trapist, and Autistic Daughters, among others. Critic Brian Olewnick has called Brandlmayr's work "extraordinarily precise".

Among others, Brandlmayr has recorded or performed with John Tilbury, Fennesz, Chad Taylor, and Otomo Yoshihide.

He was artist in residence 2002 at Podewil, Berlin. He now lives in Vienna, Austria and is an active member of Polwechsel.

== Releases ==
- Radian "radian" CD, Rhiz 1998
- Radian "tg 11" CD, Mego/Rhiz, 2000
- Trapist "Highway my friend" CD, Hathut, 2002
- Radian "rec.extern" CD, Thrilljockey, 2002
- Mapstation "version train" CD/LP, Staubgold, 2002
- Siewert/Brandlmayr "Too Beautiful To Burn" CD, Erstwhile records, 2003
- Brandlmayr/Dafeldecker/Nemeth/Siewert "Die Instabilitaet der Symmetrie" CD, 2004
- Kapital Band 1(CD/CDR Mosz, 2004)
- Trapist, Ballroom (CD, Thrilljockey, 2004)
- Radian "Juxtaposition", CD/LP, Thrilljockey, 2004
- Autistic daughters "Jealousy and diamonds" CD, Kranky 2004 / LP Staubgold 2004
- Martin Brandlmayr "manual mode", Vinyl 7inch, Ideal records, January 2005
- Werner Dafeldecker, Martin Brandlmayr, Christian Fennesz "Till The Old World's Blown Up And A New One Is Created", CD, Mosz, 2008
- Radian "Chimeric", CD/LP, Thrilljockey 2009
- Otomo Yoshihide / Axel Dörner / Sachiko M / Martin Brandlmayr "Allurements Of The Elliposid", 2CD, Neos, 2010
- David Sylvian "Sleepwalkers", CD, SamadhiSound, 2010
- eRikm / Brandlmayr "Ecotone", CD, Mikroton Recordings, 2014
- Martin Brandlymayr "Interstitial Spaces", LP, 2025
