= John Tilbury =

British pianist (born 1936)

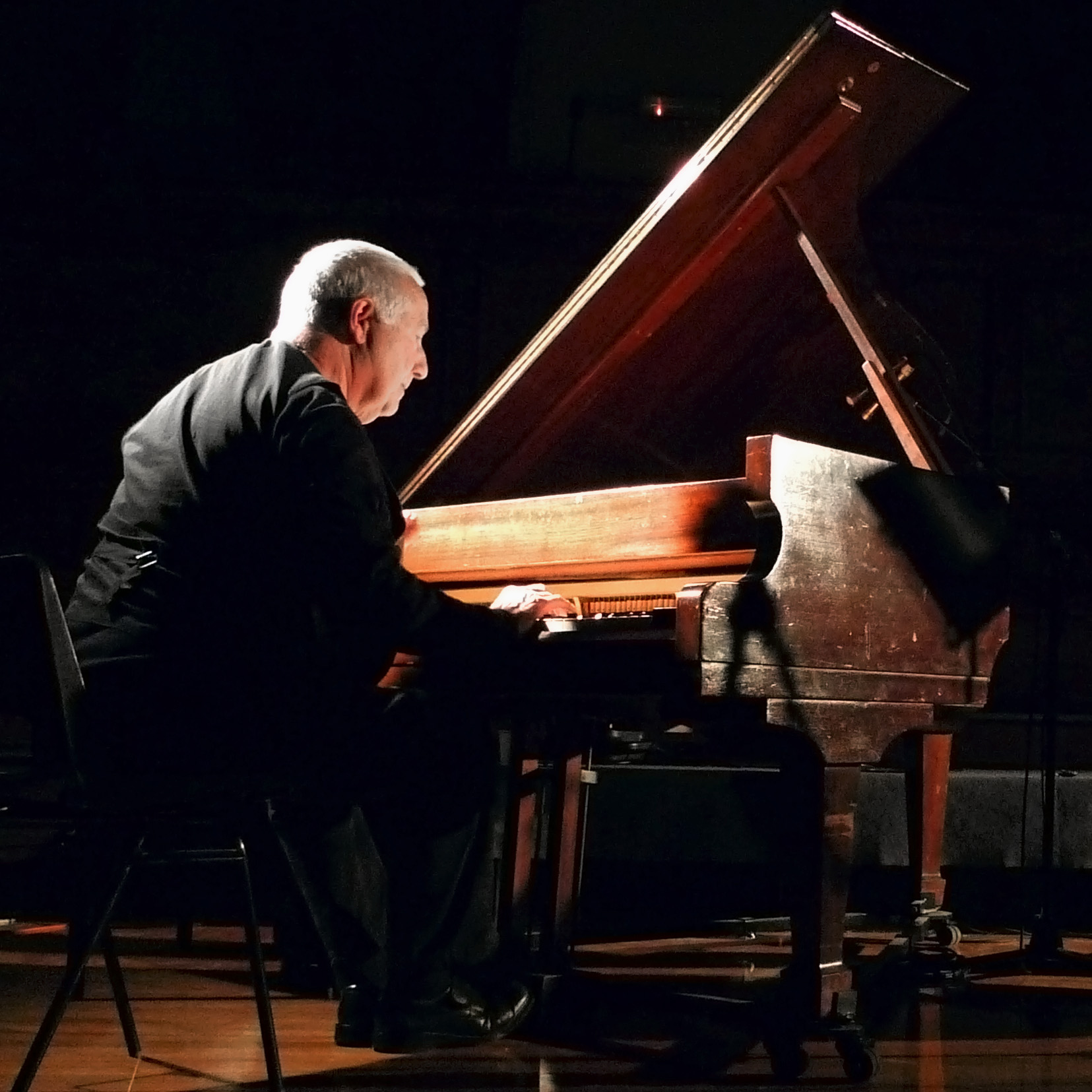
Tilbury in 2011

John Tilbury (born 1 February 1936) is a British pianist. He is considered one of the foremost interpreters of Morton Feldman's music, and since 1980 has been a member of the free improvisation group AMM.

== Early life and education ==
Tilbury was educated at Latymer Upper School in West London. He studied piano at the Royal College of Music with Arthur Alexander and James Gibb and also with Zbigniew Drzewiecki in Warsaw. In 1968 he was the winner of the Gaudeamus competition in the Netherlands.

== Musical career ==
During the 1960s, Tilbury was closely associated with the composer Cornelius Cardew, whose music he has interpreted and recorded and a member of the Scratch Orchestra. His biography of Cardew, "Cornelius Cardew – A life unfinished" was published in 2008.

Tilbury has also recorded the works of Howard Skempton and John White, among many others, and has also performed adaptations of the radio plays of Samuel Beckett. He collaborated with the choreographer Ernest Berk.

With guitarist AMM bandmate Keith Rowe's electroacoustic ensemble M.I.M.E.O., Tilbury recorded The Hands of Caravaggio, inspired by the painter's The Taking of Christ (1602). In this live performance, twelve of the members of M.I.M.E.O. were positioned around the piano in a deliberate echo of Christ's Last Supper. The thirteenth M.I.M.E.O. member (Cor Fuhler) is credited with "inside piano" as he interacted and interfered with Tilbury's playing by manipulating and damping the instrument's strings, essentially doing piano preparation in real time. Critic Brian Olewnick describes the album as "A staggering achievement, one is tempted to call The Hands of Caravaggio the first great piano concerto of the 21st century".

Tilbury's 2003 album Duos for Doris (like The Hands of Caravaggio also on Erstwhile Records), is a collaboration with Keith Rowe. Dedicated to his mother, Doris, who died days before the album was recorded on 7 January 2003, it is widely considered a landmark recording in the genre of electroacoustic improvisation (or "EAI"). In 2013, he collaborated with artist Armando Lulaj in FIEND performance at the National Theatre of Tirana (Albania). On Seaside (2016), Tilbury plays the clavichord alongside Palestinian musician Dirar Kalash playing oud and John Lely using a variety of electronics.

== Retirement ==
In 2018, although still in demand as a performer, Tilbury became reluctant to take on more concerts and ended his performing career at the age of 82. He lives in Deal, Kent with his wife Janice. But Simon Reynell asked him if he would still be happy to be recorded at his home, resulting in a series of regular performing sessions over the next eight years. Some of these recordings, along with archive material, were released as a four disc box set in May 2026.

== Discography ==
- Two Chapters and an Epilogue with Evan Parker (Matchless, 2000)
- Pianoworks (Sony, 2001)
- The Hands of Caravaggio (Erstwhile, 2002)
- Duos for Doris with Keith Rowe (Erstwhile, 2003)
- Discrete Moments with Eddie Prevost (Matchless, 2004)
- Piano Music 1993–2007 (Mathieu Copeland, 2008)
- Field (hatOLOGY, 2009)
- E.E. Tension and Circumstance with Keith Rowe (Potlatch, 2011)
- Plays Howard Skempton (Onement, 2013)
- The Just Reproach with Oren Ambarchi (Black Truffle, 2013)
- Exta with John Butcher (Fataka, 2013)
- Two Pianos and Other Pieces 1953–1969 with Philip Thomas (Another Timbre, 2014)
- Seaside with John Lely, Christian Wolff (Another Timbre, 2016)
- Playing with a Dead Person with Derek Bailey (Bolt, 2016)
- Grand Tour with Zygmunt Krauze (Bolt, 2016)
- Landmark with Eddie Prevost (+3 dB, 2018)
- Sissel with Keith Rowe (Sofa, 2018)
- The Tiger's Mind (Cubus, 2019)
- John Tilbury 'At Home' (Another Timbre, 2026)

With Morton Feldman

- For Bunita Marcus (LondonHALL, 1993)
- All Piano (LondonHALL, 1999)
- For John Cage (Diatribe, 2020)

With others

- John Cage, Sonatas & Interludes for Prepared Piano (London, 1975)
- John Cage, Winter Music (Another Timbre, 2017)
- Cornelius Cardew, Piano Music 1959–70 (Matchless, 1996)
- Angharad Davies, Goldsmiths (Another Timbre, 2016)
- Terry Jennings, Lost Daylight (Another Timbre, 2010)
- Eddie Prevost, PST Live in Rome (Auditorium Edizioni, 2012)
- Howard Riley & John Tilbury & Keith Tippett, Another Part of the Story (Emanem, 2003)
- Arnold Schoenberg, Lieder (Eterna, 1999)
- Marcus Schmickler, Variety (A-Musik, 2005)
- Marcus Schmickler, Timekeepers (A-Musik, 2015)
- Dave Smith, First Piano Concert (Matchless, 1988)
- Wadada Leo Smith, Bishopsgate Concert (Treader, 2014)
