= Günter Müller =

German sound artist (born 1954)

- Born: October 20, 1954 (age 71)
- Known for: Composer, Improviser, Visual artist

Günter Müller (born October 20, 1954) is a German sound artist who originally performed as a percussionist and drummer, active primarily in free improvisation. He was born in Munich, West Germany, but has lived in Switzerland since 1966.

== Background ==
Originally a drummer in various jazz ensembles, Müller grew interested in free improvisation and began utilizing various extended techniques. He used contact microphones to amplify his drum set, and has incorporated various electronic effects, sometimes using an iPod or MiniDisc recorder to loop or otherwise process his performances. Increasingly since about 2000 Müller has emphasized electronics, sometimes entirely forgoing percussion. Critic Brian Olewnick describes him as "one of the most fascinating collaborators in contemporary improvised music [...] tending to create subtly modulated sounds of an almost palliative nature; often with an elastically liquid rhythmic sense."

Müller was a founding member of the groups Nachtluft, poire z and Taste Tribes, and has collaborated with Gastr Del Sol, Christian Marclay, Keith Rowe, Voice Crack, Alfred Harth, Kurt Liedwart and others. He founded the record label for4ears.
