= Voice Crack =

Swiss band

Voice Crack was a Swiss electronic free improvisation band. Formed in late 1972 by Andy Guhl and Norbert Möslang, Voice Crack began as a free jazz duo. Then they used pre-recorded tape effects and live sound processing. By 1983 they had eliminated normal instruments in favor of what they called "cracked everyday electronics". This included "radios, turntables, transmitters, dictating machines" and other items that are cracked open and manipulated to produce "new sounds using magnetic and radio waves in a complex system controlled by movements of their hands and by light."

The result consisted of buzzes, clicks, drones, and oscillations. Erstwhile Records described it as "cascading magnetic waves" that "arc across the sky as three-headed critters race and rummage through alien flora." Voice Crack's work was favorably compared to some of John Cage's.

Voice Crack collaborated with Borbetomagus and Butch Morris and were members of poire z. The group disbanded in 2002.
