= John Butcher (musician) =

English saxophonist

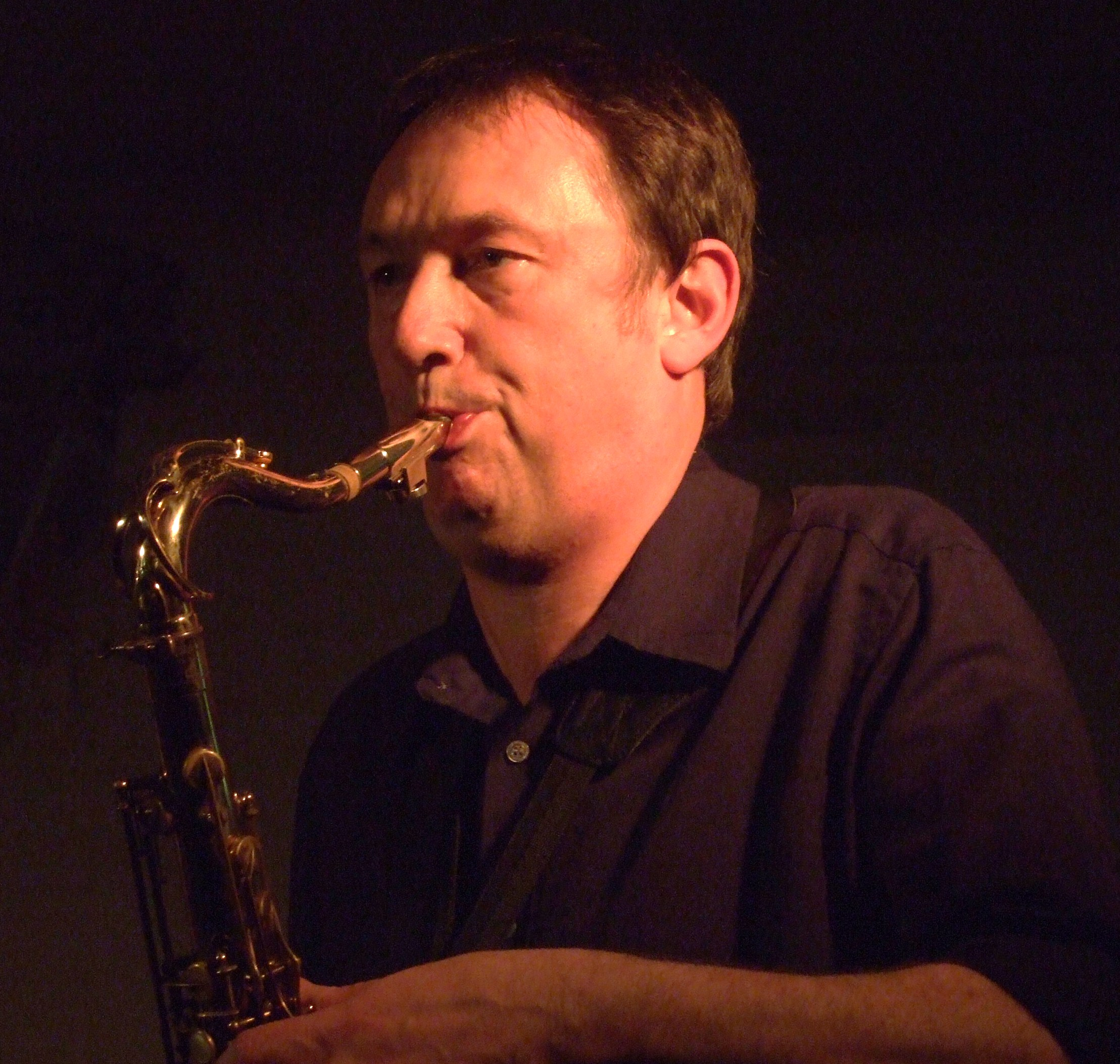

Background information
- Born: 25 October 1954 (age 72); Brighton, England
- Genre: Free jazz
- Occupation: Musician
- Instrument: Saxophone
- Years active: 1980–present

John Butcher (born 1954) is an English tenor and soprano saxophone player.

== Career ==
In the 1970s he taught himself to play saxophone. While studying physics at the University of Surrey, he met Chris Burn, and the two began playing free jazz together. In the 1980s he gave up the study of quarks to perform in a quartet with Burn. He belonged to a trio with Phil Durrant and John Russell and the band News from the Shed with Paul Lovens and Radu Malfatti. His debut album, Fonetiks, was released in 1984. A few years later he started the label Acta.

== Discography ==
=== As leader ===
- Fonetiks with Chris Burn (Bead, 1985)
- Conceits with Durrant/Russell (Acta, 1987)
- News from the Shed with Durrant/Lovens/Malfatti/Russell (Acta, 1989)
- 13 Friendly Numbers (Acta, 1992)
- Concert Moves with Durrant/Russell (Random Acoustics, 1995)
- Respiritus with Vanessa Mackness (Incus, 1995)
- London & Cologne Solos (Rastascan, 1996)
- Trio Playing with Derek Bailey (Incus, 1997)
- Secret Measures with Phil Durrant (Wobbly Rail, 1998)
- Two Concerts with Minton/Hirt, (FMP, 1998)
- 12 Milagritos with Gino Robair (Spool, 1998)
- The Scenic Route with Phil Durrant & John Russell (Emanem, 1999)
- Light's View with Georg Graewe (Nuscope, 1999)
- Requests and Antisongs with Phil Durrant (Erstwhile, 2000)
- Music On Seven Occasions (Meniscus, 2000)
- Points, Snags and Windings with Dylan van der Schyff (Meniscus, 2001)
- Vortices and Angels (Emanem, 2001)
- Intentions with Phil Durrant (Nuscope, 2001)
- Thermal with Moor/Lehn (Unsounds, 2001)
- Fixations: Solo Saxophone Improvisations 1997–2000 (Emanem, 2001)
- The First Two Gigs with Chris Burn (Emanem, 2001)
- The Contest of Pleasures (Potlatch, 2001)
- Shooters and Bowlers with Gerry Hemingway (Red Toucan, 2001)
- Tincture with Lonberg-Holm/Zerang (Musica Genera, 2001)
- Apples of Gomorrah with Phil Minton (GROB, 2002)
- Guerrilla Mosaics (482 Music 2002)
- Equation (Spool, 2002)
- Invisible Ear (Fringes, 2003)
- Optic (Emanem, 2003)
- Clearings (Art.CappuccinoNet, 2004)
- New Oakland Burr with Gino Robair (Rastascan, 2004)
- Cavern with Nightlife (Weight of Wax, 2004)
- Interworks with Eddie Prevost (Matchless, 2005)
- Concentric with Paal Nilssen-Love (Clean Feed, 2006)
- The Big Misunderstanding Between Hertz and MegaHertz with Christof Kurzmann (Potlatch, 2006)
- The Geometry of Sentiment (Emanem, 2007)
- The Contest of Plesures: Tempestuous (Another Timbre, 2007)
- Resonant Spaces (Confront, 2008)
- New Langton Arts 2000 (Limited Sedition, 2008)
- Buffalo Pearl with Gerry Hemingway (Auricle, 2008)
- Way Out Northwest with Muller/Van der Schyff (Drip Audio, 2008)
- Somethingtobesaid (Weight of Wax, 2009)
- Carliol with Rhodri Davies (Ftarri, 2010)
- Under the Roof with Claudia Ulla Binder (Nuscope, 2010)
- Empire with RED Trio (NoBusiness, 2011)
- Dusted Machinery with Toshimaru Nakamura (Monotype, 2011)
- Apophenia with Gino Robair (Rastascan, 2011)
- Daylight with Mark Sanders (Emanem, 2012)
- Bell Trove Spools (Northern Spy, 2012)
- At Oto with Matthew Shipp (Fataka, 2012)
- Winter Gardens (Kukuruku, 2013)
- Plume (Unsounds, 2013)
- Common Objects: Live in Modern Tower (Mikroton, 2013)
- Extra (Fataka, 2013)
- Tarab Cuts (Out of the Machine, 2014)
- Bottle Breaking Heart Leap (Alt.Vinyl 2015)
- Live at White Cube (Vinyl Factory/White Cube 2015)
- Experiments with a Leaf with Andy Moor (Unsounds, 2015)
- Fjordgata (Confront 2015)
- Nigemizu (Uchimizu, 2015)
- Tangle (Fataka, 2016)
- So Beautiful It Starts to Rain with Stale Liavik Solberg (Clean Feed, 2016)
- Raw with Trio Kimmig-Studer-Zimmerlin (Leo, 2016)
- RED Trio & John Butcher, Summer Skyshift (Clean Feed, 2016)
- Last Dream of the Morning (Relative Pitch, 2017)
- The Catastrophe of Minimalism with Damon Smith, Weasel Walter (Balance Point, 2017)
- Immediate Landscapes with Akio Suzuki (Ftarri, 2017)
- How Does This Happen? (Ambiances Magnetiques, 2018)
- Blasphemious Fragments with Minton/Robair (Rastascan, 2019)
- Fictional Souvenirs with Thomas/Solberg (Astral Spirits/Monofonus 2019)
- At the Hill of James Magee with Joe McPhee (Trost, 2019); For more, The Hill of James Magee art installation
- Drunk on Dreams with Rhodri Davies (Cejero, 2019)
- Old Paradise Airs with Steve Beresford (Iluso, 2020)
- On Being Observed (Weight of Wax, 2020)

=== As sideman ===
With Polwechsel

- Polwechsel 2 (hat ART 1999)
- Polwechsel 3 (Durian, 2001)
- Wrapped Islands (Erstwhile, 2002)
- Archives of the North (hatOLOGY, 2006)
- Field (hatOLOGY, 2009)

With others

- AMM, Trinity (Matchless, 2008)
- AMM, Sounding Music (Matchless, 2010)
- Anemone, A Wing Dissolved in Light (NoBusiness, 2017)
- Derek Bailey, Visitors Book (Incus, 2002)
- Derek Bailey, Scrutables (Weight of Wax, 2011)
- Burkhard Beins, Membrane (Confront, 2014)
- Steve Beresford, Fish of the Week (Scatter, 1996)
- Steve Beresford, I Shall Become a Bat (Qbico, 2004)
- Paul Dunmall, Hit and Run (FMP, 2001)
- Fred Frith, The Natural Order (Northern Spy, 2014)
- Keiji Haino, John Butcher, Light Never Bright Enough (Otoroku, 2017)
- Gerry Hemingway, Songs (Between the Lines/EFA, 2002)
- Kev Hopper, Spoombung (Thoofa, 1998)
- Okkyung Lee, Cheol-Kkot-Sae (Tzadik, 2018)
- Radu Malfatti, Ohrkiste (ITM, 1992)
- Phil Minton, Mouthfull of Ecstasy (Victo, 1996)
- Phil Minton, Slur (Emanem, 2007)
- Claudia Molitor, Decay (NMC, 2019)
- Gino Robair, Buddy Systems (Meniscus, 1998)
- Spontaneous Music Ensemble, A New Distance (Acta, 1995)
- David Sylvian, Died in the Wool – Manafon Variations (Samadhisound, 2011)
- Fred Van Hove, Suite for B...City (FMP, 1997)
- Otomo Yoshihide, Quintet & Sextet (Otoroku, 2013)
