= Erstwhile Records =

American independent record label

Erstwhile Records is an independent record label devoted to free improvisation, particularly the electroacoustic variety, contemporary, experimental composed music, and combinations of both. Erstwhile was founded by Jon Abbey in 1999, whose personality and tastes are closely identified with the label.

Characteristic label artists include guitarist Keith Rowe, percussionist Günter Müller, guitarist / turntablist Otomo Yoshihide, homemade electronics group Voice Crack, sine wave improviser Sachiko M, concrete artist Jason Lescalleet, guitarist / laptop composer Fennesz, guitarist Burkhard Stangl and synthesizer player Thomas Lehn, as well as younger musicians such as clarinetist Kai Fagaschinski. In recent years, also artists connected to the Wandelweiser group started releasing albums on the label, such as American composer Michael Pisaro.

== History ==
The first few Erstwhile releases were something of a mixed set in terms of the music, ranging from the melancholy avant-blues of Loren Connors to the rather traditional free jazz of VHF. With the release of Tom and Gerry, however ― a double-disc duet between Lehn and drummer Gerry Hemingway ― the label's focus notably shifted. It was the first album containing electroacoustic improvisation techniques which Erstwhile has become known for, as well as the first to feature meticulous post-production. The fifth Erstwhile release, World Turned Upside Down, featured a trio of guitarists Keith Rowe, Taku Sugimoto and percussionist Günter Müller. Rowe and Müller would both become fixtures of the label, and are a generation older than many of their younger collaborators. The album's abstract, sparse sound resembles live releases by AMM and MIMEO, Rowe's previous European improvisation groups.

Subsequent Erstwhile releases have largely focused on slow-moving, often quiet compositions played using non-standard computers and electronics (such as Sachiko M's "empty sampler" or Toshimaru Nakamura's "no-input mixing board"). These electronics often get paired with acoustic instruments, which are then played with amplification and extended techniques. The most prominent example of this modified instrumentation is Keith Rowe's tabletop guitar, which he uses to create textured soundscapes by incorporating household objects and sampled radio transmissions through the instrument's pickups. Another instance includes trumpeters Matt Davis and Axel Dörner, who sometimes play their instruments by blowing through the valves rather than the mouthpiece.

Releases like guitarist Martin Siewert and drummer Martin Brandlmayr's Too Beautiful to Burn or laptop artist Christof Kurzmann and guitarist Burkhard Stangl's Schnee maintain some elements of melody and accessibility, resembling other alternative genres such as post-rock or ambient music. Most Erstwhile albums however tend to showcase slow, quiet, unmoving textures of sound in a style similar to lowercase music. Good Morning Good Night by Sachiko M, Toshimaru Nakamura, and Otomo Yoshihide, for example, is 100 minutes of "vertical music" marked by piercing sine waves, bursts of static, feedback loops, and quiet vinyl crackle, demanding even for veteran listeners to avant-garde music.

The label's aesthetic has yet to find an agreed-upon name, though many categorize the music as electroacoustic improvisation, or "EAI." Some critics argue that Erstwhile and the term EAI have become almost synonymous, with NYC musician Jeremiah Cymerman regarding them as "The Blue Note of lowercase music." "Laminal music," "granular music," "reductionism," "the new London silence," "Onkyokei," "Berlin minimalism," are additional terms which have been used to define the label.

The music packaging was the responsibility of designer Friederike Paetzold, whose works often entirely forgo details like artist's names, instrumentation and album titles. Album covers tend to be characterized by stark, minimalist artwork, often painted by guitarist Keith Rowe, or Paetzold's own photography. Critic John Eyles writes, "Just as such labels as Blue Note, ECM, and Incus have captured and defined the zeitgeist at various points in the past, Erstwhile is now doing so. Like them, it has its own distinctive roster of players, its own sound and a distinctive visual style ... No need to see the label to know it’s on Erstwhile." Currently, most of the label's designs are done by producer Yuko Zama.

Unusually, Erstwhile's releases have been issued without UPCs.

== Associated festivals ==
Abbey has also organized the Amplify Festival, an annual series of live free improvisation concerts. A box set of recordings from a 2002 festival held in Tokyo was released as AMPLIFY02: Balance, and featured some of the label's flagship artists. The results of the 2004 event have been emerging as separate releases under the subsidiary label name ErstLive. In September 2005, Abbey put together a separate music festival in New York City, this time in collaboration with Tim Barnes' label Quakebasket and MoMA's The Artist Project, called ErstQuake. In 2008, an edition of the Amplify Festival called AMPLIFY:light was held in Tokyo. In 2011 and 2013, the festival again took place in New York.

== See also ==
- List of record labels
