= AMM (band) =

British free improvisation group

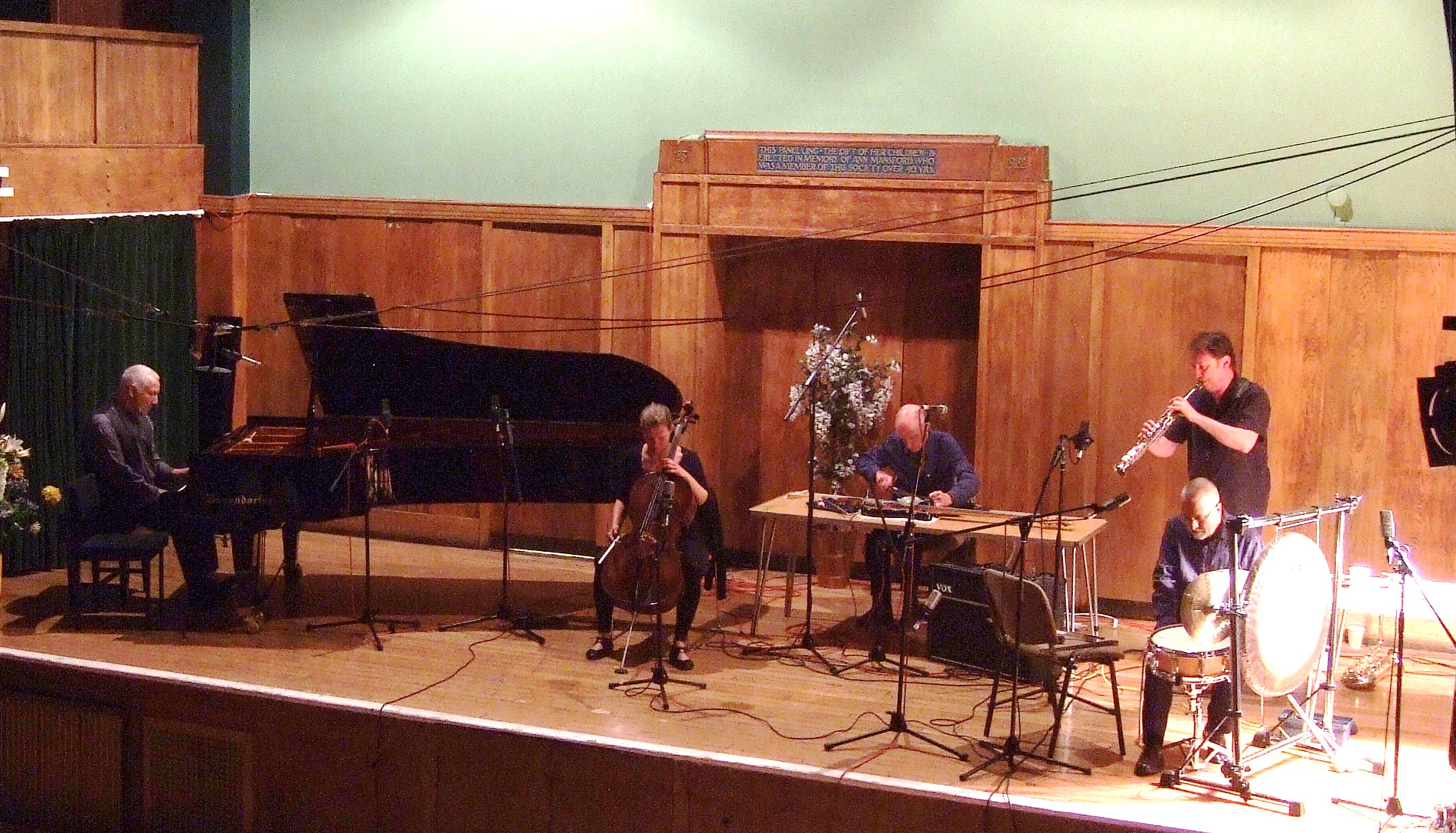

Background information
- Origin: London, England
- Genres: Free improvisation
- Years active: 1965–2022
- Labels: Elektra, Matchless
- Past members: Eddie Prévost; John Tilbury; Keith Rowe; Lou Gare; Cornelius Cardew; Lawrence Sheaff; Christopher Hobbs

AMM were a British free improvisation group that was founded in London, England, in 1965. The group was initially composed of Keith Rowe on guitar, Lou Gare on saxophone, and Eddie Prévost on drums. The three men shared an interest in exploring music beyond the boundaries of conventional jazz, as in free jazz and free improvisation. AMM never achieved widespread popularity, but have been influential in improvised music. Most of their albums have been released by Matchless Recordings, which is run by Eddie Prévost. In a 2001 interview, Keith Rowe was asked if "AMM" was an abbreviation. He replied, "The letters AMM stand for something, but as you probably know it's a secret!"

== History ==
=== 1960s ===
AMM was initially composed of Keith Rowe on guitar, Lou Gare on saxophone and Eddie Prévost on drums. Rowe and Gare were members of Mike Westbrook's jazz band; Prévost and Gare were also in a hard bop jazz quintet. The three men shared a common interest in exploring music beyond the boundaries of conventional jazz, as part of a larger movement that helped spawn European free jazz and free improvisation.

The seeds of AMM were planted in 1965. They initially had no name, and were not really a group in the conventional sense, simply a weekend experimental workshop session at the Royal College of Art in London, centred on Gare, Rowe, and Prévost. Members of the group have come and gone over the years, but Rowe and Prévost have been present for most recordings and performances; the latter has been the only constant in the nearly six decades of AMM music.

Musicians were free to join in, but such collaborations were often short-lived if the contributions were lacking the proper spirit: notable jazz saxophonist Steve Lacy sat in with the group but was quickly asked to stop playing. Observers were welcome, provided they were silent and did not disturb the proceedings. American saxophonist Ornette Coleman was asked to leave after he continually talked during one performance; Beatles member Paul McCartney once sat quietly through an early AMM session. When asked how he liked the music he said they went on too long.

Eventually, the group settled on a line-up of Prévost, Rowe, Gare, bassist Lawrence Sheaff and pianist/cellist Cornelius Cardew, and, in early 1966, were calling themselves AMM. However, some early performances were billed as the "Cornelius Cardew Quintet", a mistake which both irked and amused the musicians. After a few paying performances, Cardew bought two amplifiers so the other instruments could compete with the volume of Rowe's guitar. In addition to amplifying their instruments, Cardew and Gare would apply contact microphones to various common objects to amplify the sounds made by, for example, rubbing a glass jar or striking a coffee tin.

No AMM performance was ever planned; each was unique and spontaneous. The musicians tended to avoid any conventional melody, harmony or rhythm, and sought out an ensemble sound that often obscured any individual's role. It is often difficult to discern which musical instrument is making which specific sound on AMM recordings, due in part to liberal use of various extended techniques on their instruments.

AMM released their first recording, AMMusic 1966, on Elektra Records UK in 1966. It had some initial similarities to free jazz, due in part to Gare's saxophone. One critic has written, however, that the resemblance was rather slight: "the overall sound of the group, even in 1966, was so different, so idiosyncratic, that it's not at all surprising that both new jazz and contemporary classical audiences were baffled, if not horrified." Percussionist Christopher Hobbs (born in 1950 and a student of Cardew) also played with AMM in the late 1960s.

The next AMM material to see release were the important The Crypt sessions from 12 June 1968. Though the debut is regarded as a landmark recording, The Crypt was arguably even more important in establishing the droning, long-form music that would come to characterise AMM. Further "out" and even less conventional than earlier material, one critic has written of it that "an eerie sensation inevitably accompanies each listen to the raw streams of electric noise channeled on AMM's second album and early masterpiece, The Crypt. To ears informed by the twenty-first century, it's the uncanny feeling of listening to three-and-a-half decades of experimental music history as delivered in a chillingly prescient sort of reverse premonition ... It's a little unnerving that the only records that seem to accurately describe the brave new soundworld harnessed on The Crypt came into being well after its creation."

The Crypt sessions have been issued many times, twice in the 1980s as a double LP, and it is still available (with extra material, billed as "The Complete Sessions") on a double CD from Matchless Recordings. The Crypt continues to inspire adventurous listeners; in the liner notes to the 1992 double CD, Prévost writes, "Despite being (arguably) the most 'difficult' material on Matchless, The Crypt has been a mainstay for the label. It obviously pays not to underestimate the audience. Its continued success has enabled us to release other works. So we felt committed, obliged almost, to keep it available ... this music has proved itself not to be ephemeral."

Composer Cornelius Cardew joined AMM in 1966, performing on piano and cello. He worked with AMM intermittently until he abandoned his earlier experimental music in the late 1970s (Cardew died in an unsolved auto accident in 1981). Composer Christian Wolff performed with AMM in 1968. Cardew and Rowe became committed to socialism and to Maoism, and thought that AMM's music should reflect their sociopolitical outlook. Prévost accuses the pair of "cultural bullying", and there was tension in the group, resulting in some AMM performances being made by alternating duos: Rowe and Cardew, Prévost and Gare.

=== 1970s ===
This personal and political tension culminated with a long period (about 1972 to 1976) when AMM was rarely active, and then usually as a Prévost-Gare duo. This was arguably AMM's most jazz-like era, with Gare's sputtering, squawking saxophone (unique but showing the influence of John Gilmore and Albert Ayler) brought to the fore, although Prévost has stated the music was "decidedly non-jazz."

Rowe rejoined in the mid-1970s, and shortly thereafter, Gare departed, leaving a Rowe-Prévost duo for a period.

=== 1980s and 1990s ===
Pianist John Tilbury – previously an occasional AMM collaborator – joined in about 1980. This version of AMM generally explored quieter, more meditative sounds. Gare occasionally rejoined the group in this era; cellist Rohan de Saram was also an occasional addition.

Later collaborators have included saxophonist Evan Parker and clarinetist Ian Mitchell. Christian Wolff also returned as a collaborator for a concert at the Conway Hall in London in 2001. Prévost has reported that of all their collaborators, Parker and Wolff best grasped the AMM aesthetic.

=== 2000s ===
The Prévost/Rowe/Tilbury line-up remained stable for two decades, only occasionally augmented by guests. In the early 1990s, the trio made their first extensive tours, with a number of well-received appearances in Europe and North America.

But since about 2000, Rowe's increasing involvement with what has become known as "electroacoustic improvisation" ("eai" for short), especially under the aegis of Jon Abbey's Erstwhile Records, meant that more of his musical activities began to take place outside AMM. Rowe has reported that he felt somewhat limited having been almost exclusively a Matchless Records artist, and that he wanted to explore music outside of AMM. Tension between Rowe and Prévost was exacerbated by the appearance of Prévost's second book of essays, Minute Particulars, which contained some disparaging comments about Rowe, who then left the group. In his review of Prévost's book, Walter Horn notes that while Prévost offers often scathing opinions of many people, Rowe is singled out for multiple barbs, and "one can hardly fail to wonder whether there's something of a personal nature lurking behind the barrage of what are superficially theoretical complaints."

The trio's last performance with Rowe is documented on the 2005 double-CD Apogee. The set is shared with another of the electronic improvisational ensembles that emerged during the 1960s: Musica Elettronica Viva (MEV). The first CD is a studio recording in a joint session in England on 30 April 2004 featuring MEV's Alvin Curran, Richard Teitelbaum and Frederic Rzewski with Prévost-Rowe-Tilbury. This is the first occasion that the two ensembles have performed together, but not the first time they have shared a split release: each outfit filled a side of the LP Live Electronic Music Improvised, released on a US label in 1968 (AMM's side features excerpts from The Crypt sessions; MEV's side is an excerpt from their magnum opus "Spacecraft."). The second CD consists of the performances that each group gave at a festival held in London on 1 May 2004.

Prévost and Tilbury continue to record and perform as AMM. They performed in London during December 2004, with Sachiko M joining as a guest, at the 2005 LMC Festival of Experimental Music, with David Jackman as a guest, and at a festival of experimental music in Belgium in February 2006. They also released a duo CD as AMM, Norwich, during 2005, and in 2009, the CD Trinity with guest John Butcher. In 2010 the core duo of Eddie Prévost and John Tilbury along with John Butcher, Christian Wolff and Ute Kangiesser released a CD called "Sounding Music" (the first simply tagged as AMM after 2005's Norwich) containing the concert performed at "Freedom of the City" festival, Conway Hall, London on 3 May 2009.

More recent recordings on Matchless featuring the duo form of AMM include: 'Uncovered Correspondence' recorded in Jasło, Poland (2010) and 'Two London Concerts' (2011).

AMM appeared on SWR2 NOWJazz Session, Donaueschingen 2012.

AMM (Tilbury, Prévost & Rowe) appeared on 29 November 2015 as the final performance in the Huddersfield Contemporary Music Festival.

AMM disbanded in 2022, after playing their final performance at Cafe Oto on July 30.

== Critical appraisal ==
Michael Nyman wrote, "AMM seem to have worked without the benefit or hindrance of any kind of prepared external discipline."

== Members ==
- Lou Gare – saxophone (1965–76 and occasionally thereafter until c. 1992)
- Eddie Prévost – percussion (1965–2022)
- Keith Rowe – guitar (1965–2004, 2015–2022)
- Cornelius Cardew – piano, cello (1966–73)
- Lawrence Sheaff – accordion, cello (1966–67)
- Christopher Hobbs – percussion (1968–71)
- John Tilbury – piano (1980–2022)
- Rohan de Saram – cello (c. 1986–94)

== Discography ==
Year	Title	Personnel	Notes
1966	AMMMusic	Cardew/Gare/Prévost/Rowe/Sheaff	recorded on 8 and 27 June 1966 at Sound Techniques and released in 1967 as LP Elektra UK 256, re-released as a CD with additional material in 1990 by ReRMegacorp
1968	The Crypt	Cardew/Gare/Hobbs/Prévost/Rowe	recorded live on 12 June, originally excerpted on Live Electronic Music Improvised split release with MEV in 1970 (LP Mainstream MS 5002), released in 1981 as 2-LP set on Matchless Recordings, re-released in 1994 as 2CD with additional material (Matchless MRDCD05)
1973	At the Roundhouse	Gare/Prévost	Incus EP1 Also as CD. Anomalous Records Ices-01
1973	To Hear and Back Again	Gare/Prévost	Matchless LP MRLP03, re-released as a CD with additional material in 1994 Matchless Recordings MRCD03
1979	It Had Been an Ordinary Enough Day in Pueblo, Colorado	Prévost/Rowe (credited as "AMM III")	ECM/JAPO 60031 Re-released as a CD in 1991
1983	Generative Themes	Prévost/Rowe/Tilbury	Matchless Recordings MRLP06, re-released as a CD with additional material in 1994 MRCD06
1984	Combine + Laminates	Prévost/Rowe/Tilbury	Pogus Productions LP P 201–4, re-released as a CD in 1995 (including a version of Cardew's TREATISE'82 recorded at the same Chicago concert) as Matchless Recordings MRCD26
1987	The Inexhaustible Document	Prévost/Rowe/Tilbury & de Saram	Matchless Recordings MRLP13, re-released as a CD with additional material in 1994 MRCD13
1988	IRMA – an opera by Tom Phillips	Prévost/Rowe/Tilbury & Mitchell/Coxhill/Lorraine/Pederson/Phillips	Matchless Recordings MRCD16
1990	The Nameless Uncarved Block	Prévost/Rowe/Tilbury & Gare	Matchless Recordings MRCD20
1993	Newfoundland	Prévost/Rowe/Tilbury	Matchless Recordings MRCD23
1994	Live in Allentown USA	Prévost/Rowe/Tilbury	Matchless Recordings MRCD30
1995	From a Strange Place	Prévost/Rowe/Tilbury	Modern Music (P.S.F. Records) Japan. PSFD-80
1996	1969/1982/1994: LAMINAL	Cardew/Gare/Hobbs/Prévost/Rowe/Tilbury	a retrospective 3-CD set of: (1) The Aarhus Sequences recorded in Denmark, 1969 (Cardew/Gare/Hobbs/Prévost/Rowe/Tilbury), (2) The Great Hall recorded at Goldsmiths' College, London 1982 & (3) Contextual recorded in New York, 1994 (both Prévost/Rowe/Tilbury); Matchless Recordings MRCD31 (pub. 1996)
1996	Before Driving to the Chapel We Took Coffee with Rick and Jennifer Reed	Prévost/Rowe/Tilbury	recording of concert in Houston Texas, Matchless Recordings MRCD35
2000	Tunes without Measure or End	Prévost/Rowe/Tilbury	recorded at free radICCals Festival, Glasgow 4 May 2000, Matchless Recordings MRCD44
2001	Fine	Prévost/Rowe/Tilbury	recorded at Musique Action festival, Vandœuvre-lès-Nancy, France on 24 May 2001, Matchless Recordings MRCD46
2002	AMM & Formanex	Prévost/Rowe/Tilbury & John White, Laurent Dailleau, Anthony Taillard, Christophe Havard, Julien Ottavi, Emmanuel Leduc	A version of Cornelius Cardew's Treatise recorded at Musique Action Festival, Vandœuvre-lès-Nancy, France June 2002; fibrr records 006
2004	Apogee	Prévost/Rowe/Tilbury & MEV	double CD. First CD contains sextet recordings made on 30 April 2004. Second CD contain separate performance by MEV and AMM made at Freedom of the City Festival on 1 May 2004 Matchless Recordings mrcd 61
2005	Norwich	Prévost/Tilbury (first recording since Rowe's departure)	recorded at Musique Action festival, Vandœuvre-lès-Nancy, France on 24 May 2001, Matchless recordings MRCD64
2009	Trinity	Prévost/Tilbury & John Butcher	recorded at Trinity College of Music in Greenwich on 13 January 2008 Matchless recordings mrcd71
2010	Sounding Music	Prévost/Tilbury & John Butcher, Christian Wolff, Ute Kanngiesser	recorded at a concert given at the "Freedom of the City" festival, Conway Hall, London on Sunday 3 May 2009 Matchless Recordings mrcd77
2011	Uncovered Correspondence: A Postcard from Jaslo	Prévost/Tilbury	recorded at the Jasielski Dom Kultury Centre in Poland on 15 May 2010 Matchless Recordings mrcd78
2012	Two London Concerts	Prévost/Tilbury	E1 recorded at the Rag Factory, Spitalfields, London on 6 March 2011 at As Alike As Trees festival of improvised music. SE1 recorded at a concert given at The Purcell Room, London, on 27 November 2011, part of The Engine Room, Morley College's Festival and Conference celebrating the life, works and legacy of Cornelius Cardew Matchless Recordings mrcd85
2012	Place sub. v	Prévost/Tilbury	recorded at a CODES – The Festival of Traditional and Avant-garde Music, Lublin, Poland on 16 May 2012 Matchless recordings mrcd91
2015	Spanish Fighters	Prévost/Tilbury	recorded at the festival Neposlusno (Sound Disobedience) in Ljubljana, Slovenia on 16 November 2012 Matchless recordings mrcd94
2018	An Unintended Legacy	Prévost/Rowe/Tilbury	Three CDs: CD 1 recorded at Cafe OTO, in London, England, on 5 December 2015; CD 2 recorded at Eglise St-Merry, in Paris, France, on 7 April 2016; CD 3 recorded at Dokkhuset, in Trondheim, Norway, on 9 June 2016 Matchless recordings mrcd97
2019	Until the Next Time	Prévost/Rowe/Tilbury	Recorded live at NEXT Festival in Bratislava, A4 – Space for Contemporary Culture, 29 November 2018 NEXT Festival Records nxt002
2021	Industria	Prévost/Tilbury	Recorded live at Museu Industrial de Bala do Tejo, in Portugal, on 9 October 2015 Matchless recordings mrcd105
2023	Last Calls	Prévost/Rowe/Tilbury	First track is the final AMM performance, recorded live at Café OTO, in London, England, on 30 July 2022 (Prévost/Rowe). Second track is Tilbury solo, recorded in his Deal, Kent home on 18 January 2023.

== Sources ==
- Philip Clark: The Wire Primers: A Guide To Modern Music AMM, pages 113–121; Verso, 2009; ISBN 978-1-84467-427-5
- Michael Nyman: Experimental Music: Cage and Beyond (second edition); Cambridge University Press, 1999; ISBN 0-521-65383-5
- Edwin Prévost: No Sound Is Innocent: AMM and the Practice of Self-Invention—Meta-Musical Narratives, Essays Copula, 1995; ISBN 0-9525492-0-4
- Edwin Prévost: Minute Particulars: Meanings in Music Making in the Wake of Hierarchical Realignments and Other Essays Copula, 2004: ISBN 0-9525492-1-2
- John Tilbury: Cornelius Cardew: a life unfinished chapter 7 AMM 1965 – 71, Copula 2008: ISBN 978-0-9525492-4-6
- Edwin Prévost: 'The First Concert: an adaptive appraisal of a Meta Music', Copula, 2011: ISBN 0-9525492-5-5
