= Keith Rowe =

English experimental musician (born 1940)

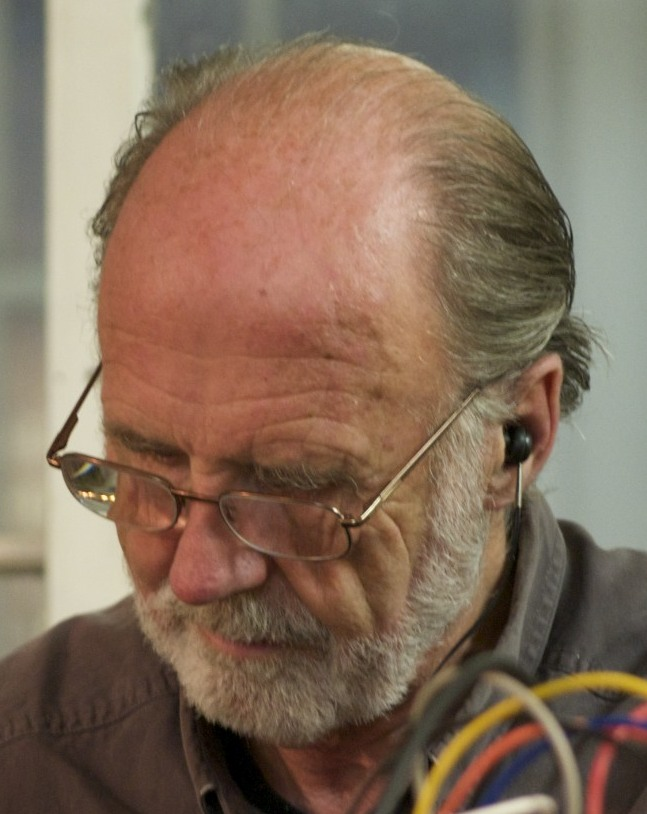
- Keith Rowe performing at the 2011 Non-Event show in Boston

Background information
- Born: March 16, 1940 (age 86); Plymouth, Devon, United Kingdom
- Genres: Free improvisation, electroacoustic improvisation
- Instrument: Tabletop guitar
- Label: Erstwhile Records
- Formerly of: AMM, M.I.M.E.O

Keith Rowe (born 16 March 1940) is an English free improvisation tabletop guitarist and painter. Rowe is a founding member of both AMM in the mid-1960s and M.I.M.E.O. Having trained as a visual artist, his paintings have appeared on most of his albums. He is seen as a godfather of EAI (electroacoustic improvisation), with many of his recordings having been released by Erstwhile.

== Biography ==
Rowe began his career playing jazz in the early 1960s with Mike Westbrook and Lou Gare. His early influences were guitarists Wes Montgomery, Charlie Christian, and Barney Kessel. However, Rowe grew tired of what he considered the genre's limitations, and began experimenting with his guitar. An important step was a New Year's resolution to stop tuning his guitar—much to Westbrook's displeasure. He began playing free jazz and free improvisation, abandoning conventional guitar technique. He was featured in Crossing Bridges, a 1985 music program based around jazz guitar improvisation, and broadcast by Channel 4.

His change was partially inspired by a teacher in a painting class who told him, "Rowe, you cannot paint a Caravaggio. Only Caravaggio can paint Caravaggio." Rowe said that after considering this idea from a musical perspective, "trying to play guitar like Jim Hall seemed quite wrong." For several years he contemplated how to reinvent his approach to the guitar, again finding inspiration in visual art, specifically American painter Jackson Pollock, who abandoned traditional painting methods to forge his style. "How could I abandon the technique? Lay the guitar flat!"

Rowe developed prepared guitar techniques: placing the guitar flat on a table and manipulating the strings, body, and pick-ups in unorthodox ways. He has used needles, electric motors, violin bows, iron bars, a library card, rubber eraser, springs, hand-held electric fans, alligator clips, and common office supplies in playing the guitar. Rowe sometimes incorporates live radio broadcasts into his performances, including shortwave radio and number stations (the guitar's pick-ups will also pick up radio signals, and broadcast them through the amplifier).

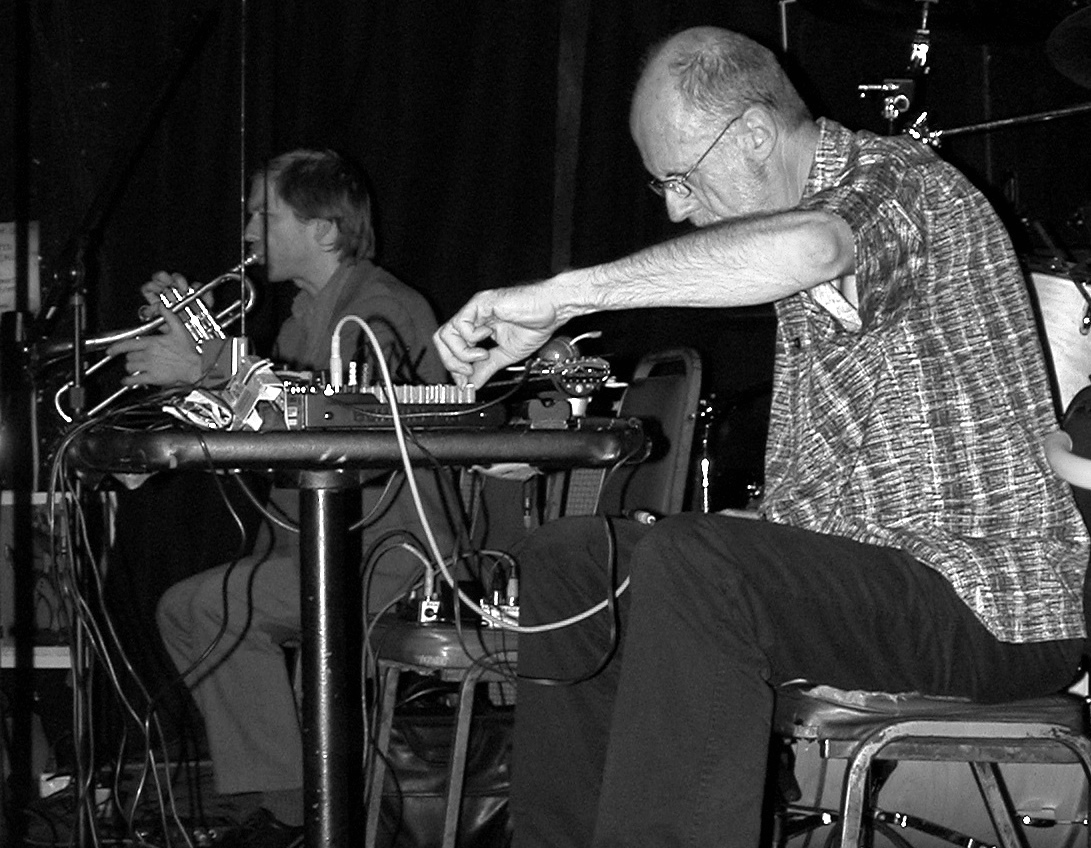
Axel Dörner and Keith Rowe in Chicago, Illinois, 22 September 2004

Percussionist Eddie Prévost of AMM said Rowe finds radio broadcasts which seem to blend ideally with, or offer startling commentary on, the music. (Prévost, 18). On AMMMusic, towards the end of the cacophonous "Ailantus Glandolusa", a speaker announces via radio that "We cannot preserve the normal music." Prevost writes that during an AMM performance in Istanbul, Rowe located and integrated a radio broadcast of "the pious intonation of a male Turkish voice. AMM of course, had absolutely no idea what the material was. Later, it was complimented upon the judicious way that verses from The Koran had been introduced into the performance, and the respectful way they had been treated!"

In reviewing World Turned Upside Down, critic Dan Hill writes, "Rowe has tuned his shortwave radio to some dramatically exotic gameshow and human voices spatter the mix, though at such low volume, they're unintelligible and abstracted. Rowe never overplays this device, a clear temptation with such a seductive technology – the awesome possibility of sonically reaching out across a world of voices requires experienced hands to avoid simple but ultimately short-term pleasure. This he does masterfully, mixing in random operatics and chance encounters with talk show hosts to anchor the sound in humanity, amidst the abstraction."

Rowe has worked with Oren Ambarchi, Burkhard Beins, Cornelius Cardew, Christian Fennesz, Kurt Liedwart, Jeffrey Morgan, Toshimaru Nakamura, Evan Parker, Michael Pisaro, Peter Rehberg, Sachiko M, Howard Skempton, Taku Sugimoto, David Sylvian, John Tilbury (on Duos for Doris and E.E. Tension and Circumstance), Christian Wolff, and Otomo Yoshihide.

In 2008 at Tate Modern, London, Rowe performed a live collaborative work The Room with film makers, Jarman award winner Luke Fowler, and Peter Todd as a part of the programme accompanying the major retrospective of the painter Mark Rothko. The Room featured films by Fowler and Todd and live guitar improvisation by Rowe with subsequent iterations being presented in France and Spain and the Netmage festival in Bologna Italy. The Room is also the title of a work by Rowe issued on CD in 2007, followed by The Room Extended in 2016 on a four CD set, both released via Erstwhile.
