= Free improvisation =

Music genre

- Other names: Free improv; free form music; free music; free form improvisation
- Stylistic origins: Free jazz; avant-garde jazz; 20th-century classical; serialism; indeterminacy
- Cultural origins: Mid-1960s United Kingdom, United States, and Europe
- Derivative forms: Electroacoustic improvisation

Other topics
- Aleatoric music; ambient music; experimental rock; glitch music; noise music; post-rock; progressive music; psychedelia

Free improvisation (also known as free-form music) is a form of improvised music centered on a commitment to non-idiomatic musical expression. It developed through free jazz, serialism and indeterminacy, and is characterized by a general rejection of formal music theory and tonality, instead following the intuition of its performers and the exploration of dynamic, timbre and texture. The term can refer to both a technique—employed by any musician in any genre—and as a recognizable genre of experimental music in its own right.

Free improvisation, as a genre of music, developed primarily in the U.K. as well as the U.S. and Europe in the mid to late 1960s, largely as an outgrowth of free jazz and contemporary classical music. Exponents of free improvised music include the improvising groups AMM and Spontaneous Music Ensemble, as well as solo instrumentalists such as saxophonists Evan Parker, Anthony Braxton, Peter Brötzmann and John Zorn, trombonist George E. Lewis, guitarists Derek Bailey, Henry Kaiser, Fred Frith, Taku Sugimoto and Toshimaru Nakamura, bassists Damon Smith and Jair-Rohm Parker Wells, and composer Pauline Oliveros.

== Characteristics ==
In the context of music theory, free improvisation denotes the shift from a focus on harmony and structure to other dimensions of music, such as timbre, texture, melodic intervals, rhythm and spontaneous musical interactions between performers. This can give free improvised music abstract and nondescript qualities. Although individual performers may choose to play in a certain style or key, or at certain tempos, conventions such as song structures are highly uncommon; more emphasis is generally placed on the mood of the music, or on performative gestures, than on preset forms of melody, harmony or rhythm. These elements are improvised at will as the music progresses, and performers will often intuitively react to each other based on the elements of their performance.

English guitarist Derek Bailey described free improvisation as "playing without memory". In his book Improvisation, Bailey wrote that free improvisation "has no stylistic or idiomatic commitment. It has no prescribed idiomatic sound. The characteristics of freely improvised music are established only by the sonic musical identity of the person or persons playing it."

Free music performers from disparate backgrounds often engage musically with other genres. For example, Italian composer Ennio Morricone was a member of the free improvisation group Nuova Consonanza. Anthony Braxton has written opera, and John Zorn has written acclaimed orchestral pieces.

== History ==
Though there are many important precedents and developments, free improvisation developed gradually, making it difficult to pinpoint a single moment when the style was born. Free improvisation primarily descends from the Indeterminacy movement and free jazz.

Guitarist Derek Bailey contends that free improvisation must have been the earliest musical style, because "mankind's first musical performance couldn't have been anything other than a free improvisation." Similarly, Keith Rowe stated, "Other players got into playing freely, way before AMM, way before Derek [Bailey]! Who knows when free playing started? You can imagine lute players in the 1500s getting drunk and doing improvisations for people in front of a log fire.. the noise, the clatter must have been enormous. You read absolutely incredible descriptions of that. I cannot believe that musicians back then didn't float off into free playing. The melisma in Monteverdi [sic] must derive from that. But it was all in the context of a repertoire."

The London-based independent radio station Resonance 104.4FM, founded by the London Musicians Collective, frequently broadcasts experimental and free improvised performance works. WNUR 89.3 FM ("Chicago's Sound Experiment") is another source for free improvised music on the radio. Taran's Free Jazz Hour broadcast on Radio-G 101.5 FM, Angers and Euradio 101.3 FM, Nantes is entirely dedicated to free jazz and other freely improvised music. A l'improviste.

=== Classical precedents ===
By the middle decades of the 20th century, composers such as Henry Cowell, Earle Brown, David Tudor, La Monte Young, Jackson Mac Low, Morton Feldman, Sylvano Bussotti, Karlheinz Stockhausen, and George Crumb, re-introduced improvisation to European art music, with compositions that allowed or even required musicians to improvise. One notable example of this is Cornelius Cardew's Treatise: a graphic score with no conventional notation whatsoever, which musicians were invited to interpret.

Improvisation is still commonly practised by some organists at concerts or church services, and courses in improvisation (including free improvisation) are part of many higher education programmes for church musicians.

=== International free improvisation ===
Since 2002 New Zealand collective Vitamin S has hosted weekly improvisations based around randomly drawn trios. Vitamin S takes the form beyond music and includes improvisers from other forms such as dance, theatre and puppetry.

Since 2006, improvisational music in many forms has been supported and promoted by ISIM, the International Society for Improvised Music. ISIM comprises some 300 performing artists and scholars worldwide, including Pauline Oliveros, Robert Dick, Jane Ira Bloom, Roman Stolyar, Mark Dresser, and many others.

Founded in Manchester, England, in 2007, the Noise Upstairs has been an institution dedicated to the practice of improvised music, hosting regular concerts and creative workshops where they have promoted international and UK-based artists such as Ken Vandermark, Lê Quan Ninh, Ingrid Laubrock, and Yuri Landman. On top of these events, the Noise Upstairs runs monthly jam nights.

In Berlin, Germany, from the 1990s onwards, a school of free improvisation emerged known as echtzeitmusik (‘real-time music’ or ‘immediate music’). This has been sustained by supportive venues such as ausland, Anorak Club, Labor Sonor, and others.

=== The downtown scene ===
In late 1970s New York a group of musicians came together who shared an interest in free improvisation as well as rock, jazz, contemporary classical, world music and pop. They performed at lofts, apartments, basements and venues located predominantly in downtown New York (8BC, Pyramid Club, Environ, Roulette, The Knitting Factory and Tonic) and held regular concerts of free improvisation which featured many of the prominent figures in the scene, including John Zorn, Bill Laswell, George E. Lewis, Fred Frith, Tom Cora, Toshinori Kondo, Wayne Horvitz, Eugene Chadbourne, Zeena Parkins, Anthony Coleman, Polly Bradfield, Ikue Mori, Robert Dick, Ned Rothenberg, Bob Ostertag, Christian Marclay, David Moss, Kramer and many others. They worked with each other, independently and with many of the leading European improvisers of the time, including Derek Bailey, Evan Parker, Han Bennink, Misha Mengelberg, Peter Brötzmann and others. Many of these musicians continue to use improvisation in one form or another in their work.

=== Electronic free improvisation ===
Electronic devices such as oscillators, echoes, filters and alarm clocks were an integral part of free improvisation performances by groups such as Kluster at the underground scene at Zodiac Club in Berlin in the late 1960s. For the 1975 jazz-rock concert recording Agharta, Miles Davis and his band employed free improvisation and electronics, particularly guitarist Pete Cosey who improvised sounds by running his guitar through a ring modulator and an EMS Synthi A.

But it was only later that traditional instruments were disbanded altogether in favour of pure electronic free improvisation. In 1984, the Swiss improvisation duo Voice Crack started making use of strictly "cracked everyday electronics".

=== Electroacoustic improvisation ===
A recent branch of improvised music is characterized by quiet, slow moving, minimalistic textures and often utilizing laptop computers or unorthodox forms of electronics.

Developing worldwide in the mid-to-late 1990s, with centers in New York, Tokyo and Austria, this style has been called lowercase music or EAI (electroacoustic improvisation), and is represented, for instance, by the American record label Erstwhile Records and the Austrian label Mego.

EAI is often radically different even from established free improvisation. Eyles writes, "One of the problems of describing this music is that it requires a new vocabulary and ways of conveying its sound and impact; such vocabulary does not yet exist – how do you describe the subtle differences between different types of controlled feedback? I've yet to see anyone do it convincingly – hence the use of words like 'shape' and 'texture'!"

== Legacy ==
Paul McCartney is anecdotally noted as having been an audience member for an AMM performance in 1967, and said that "they went on too long", although he did feel inspired by them. Additionally, Syd Barrett of Pink Floyd also sat in at early AMM performances, with Barrett later drawing influences from Keith Rowe's prepared guitar technique in his own psychedelic free-form playing on The Piper at the Gates of Dawn through the use of a zippo lighter as a guitar slide.

Free improvised music maintained a partial influence on the first wave of post-rock in the 1990s.

== See also ==
- Aesthetics of music
- Avant-garde music
- Experimental music
- Intuitive music
- Prepared guitar
- Musical collective
- Musics (magazine)
- Surrealist music
- List of free improvising musicians and groups
