= Improvised Music from Japan =

Improvised Music from Japan is a music website and record label.

The website was originally known as Japanese Free Improvisers. As its name suggests, it concentrates on Japanese and Japan-based musical improvisers, particularly free improvisers. It was founded in 1996 by Yoshiyuki Suzuki.

== Releases ==
In December 2001, a compilation box-set, also called Improvised Music from Japan, was released to mark the fifth anniversary of the website. It was a 10 CD collection of previously unissued material from a variety of Japanese musicians (some of them collaborating with Europeans and Americans). The artists featured on the release are:

- Tetuzi Akiyama
- Big Picture (band)
- Haco
- Shoji Hano
- Junji Hirose
- Ryoji Hojito
- Yoshimitsu Ichiraku
- Kazuo Imai
- Incapacitants
- Atsuhiro Ito
- Utah Kawasaki
- Kyoko Kuroda
- Brett Larner
- Sachiko M
- Toshimaru Nakamura
- Takehito Nakazato
- Mitsuru Nasuno
- Masahiko Okura
- Aki Onda
- Yasuhiro Otani
- Otomo Yoshihide
- Tetsu Saitoh
- Michihiro Sato
- Skist
- Taku Sugimoto
- Tamaru
- Yumiko Tanaka
- Tsuguto Tsunoda
- Kazuhisa Uchihashi
- Michiyo Yagi
- Seiichi Yamamoto
- Tetsuro Yasunaga
- Ami Yoshida
- Yasuhiro Yoshigaki

The label has since released a number of other records featuring similar artists:

- Toshimaru Nakamura, Tetuzi Akiyama and guests, Meeting at Off Site Vol. 1 (IMJ-501, April 2002)
- Otomo Yoshihide, Ensemble Cathode (IMJ-502, July 2002)
- Kaffe Matthews, Andrea Neumann and Sachiko M, In Case of Fire Take the Stairs (IMJ-503, December 2002)
- Ami Yoshida, Tiger Thrush (IMJ-504, July 2003)
- Shoji Hano, 48 (IMJ-505, May 2003)
- Toshimaru Nakamura, Tetuzi Akiyama and guests, Meeting at Off Site Vol. 2 (IMJ-506, May 2003)
- Yumiko Tanaka, Tayutauta (IMJ-507, due January 2004)
- Raku Sugifatti (Radu Malfatti and Taku Sugimoto), Futatsu (IMJ-508/9, December 2003)
- Aki Onda, Bon Voyage! (IMJ-510, October 2003)
- Otomo Yoshihide, Park Je Chun and Mi Yeon, Loose Community (IMJ-511, December 2003)
- Peter Brötzmann and Shoji Hano, Funny Rat (IMJ-512, October 2003)
- Toshimaru Nakamura, Side Guitar (IMJ-513, December 2003)
- Han Bennink and Kazuo Imai, Across the Desert (IMJ-514, December 2003)
- Toshimaru Nakamura, Tetuzi Akiyama and guests, Meeting at Off Site Vol. 3 (IMJ-515, December 2003)

Other Japanese artists which could be considered free improvisers include:

- Kaoru Abe
- Masayuki Takayanagi

== See also ==
- List of Japanoise artists
