= Mitsuhiro Yoshimura =

Japanese musician (born 1973)

Mitsuhiro Yoshimura (born 1973, Kanagawa, Japan) is, primarily, a Japanese musician who is, as of 2008, active in the field of electroacoustic improvisation (eai) and, in particular, the Onkyokei (onkyo) style. He also runs the label (h)ear rings and, since 2006, has been the editor and publisher of the free paper Santa which he works on with Taku Sugimoto and Toshiya Tsunoda.

== Music ==
Yoshimura's music makes use of auditory feedback which he creates using a microphone (to pick up the noise in the room of performance), a small mixing console (used to carry the signal and to record performances), an equalizer (to adjust the frequencies sent to the output - the equaliser is set up prior to, and is left untouched throughout, the performance) and a set of headphones (which project the sound back into the room - no other amplification is used).

This process of sound creation is somewhat similar to that of Toshimaru Nakamura who uses a mixing console with its output connected to its input to create "no input" feedback. The techniques are not indistinguishable however; Yoshimura's music, unlike Nakamura's, can be altered by the noises which occur in the room in which it is performed (such an audience members moving or other musicians playing instruments etc.) because these sounds will be picked up by the microphone and alter the timbre or pitch of the feedback.

As a result of this, Yoshimura has the ability to leave the music, if he wishes, to effectively play itself. By distancing himself from the musical process in this way (see indeterminate music and aleatoric music) he raises questions of what can be called 'improvisation' and even, some may say, what can be called music. This is a recurring trend in much of onkyo - particularly Sachiko M's work with sinewaves (e.g. her playing on Filament's album "29092000" on Sachiko's own 'Amoebic' label). Similarities can also be found with the music of composers like John Cage (see 4′33″) and much process and minimalist music. For many fans of the style this lack of involvement adds to the music's appeal.

== (h)ear rings ==
(h)ear rings is the name of a record label founded and run by Yoshimura. As of March 2008 only two CDs have been released, both involving Yoshimura as a performer, but the label extends its activities beyond record publishing. This includes organising live performances of improvised music in Tokyo (mostly with Yoshimura, and others, performing) and publishing the "Santa journal.

== Releases ==
Yoshimura has appeared on four released recordings. The first was a solo disc titled "And so on" which was released in January 2007. Each of the tracks on the album were recorded by Yoshimura himself on three dates and at three locations. The first track, 'And,' was recorded at Loop-Line, Tokyo on July 9, 2005; the second track, "so," was recorded at Mone, Tokyo on August 7, 2005; the third, and final, track, titled "on," was recorded at Art Space Tetra, Fukuoka on September 22, 2006. Yoshimura mastered the album himself and the artwork was supplied by Yuka Nimura.

The second release he has appeared on was a duo with Taku Sugimoto (who played electric fan, CD, acoustic guitar and lightsabers) which was recorded live, again by Yoshimura, at Loop-Line on July 8, 2007. The CD was released in October of the same year under the title "Not BGM and So On." As with "And so on," "Not BGM and So On" was mastered by Yoshimura and had artwork drawn by Yuka Nimura.

Yoshimura's most recent recordings are Santa with Taku Sugimoto and Toshiya Tsunoda, and Trio with Masahiko Okura (both 2008).
