= Bussmann =

Bussmann or Busmann is a surname. Notable people with the surname include:

Bussmann:

- Andrea Bussmann (born 1980), Canadian director and writer
- Gaëtan Bussmann (born 1991), French football player
- Hilde Bussmann (1914–1988), German table tennis player
- Jane Bussmann (born 1969), English comedian and author who has written for television and radio
- Michael Bussmann (born 1972), German taekwondo athlete
- Nicholas Bussmann, English composer and performer
- Hadumod Bußmann (born 1933), German linguist
- Walter Bussmann (1904–1957), Swiss cross-country skier

Busmann:

- Eugen Busmann (1929–2015), German sculptor and academic teacher
- Johannes Busmann (born 1961), German university lecturer and publisher

== See also ==
- Bussmann and Quantick Kingsize, short-lived radio programme that aired from April to May 1998
