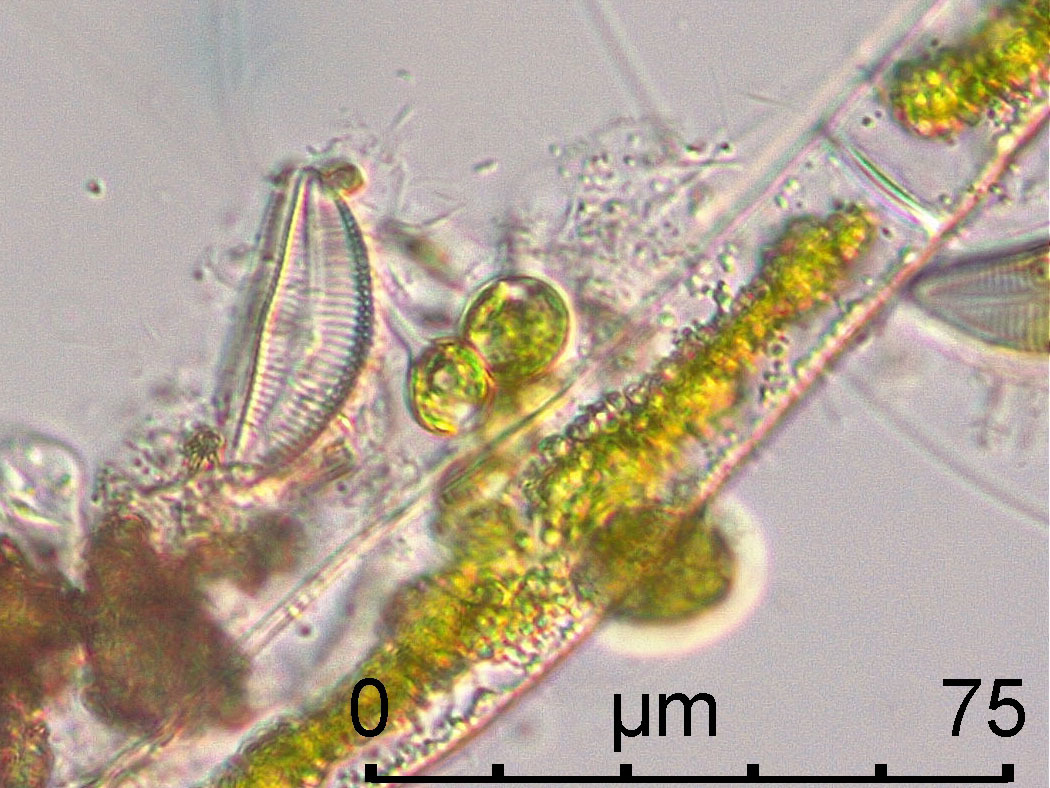
- Chaetosphaeridium globosum

Scientific classification
- Kingdom: Plantae
- Division: Charophyta
- Class: Coleochaetophyceae
- Order: Chaetosphaeridiales
- Family: Chaetosphaeridiaceae
- Genus: Chaetosphaeridium; Klebahn

Synonyms
- Nordstedtia Borzì, 1892

= Chaetosphaeridium =

Genus of algae

Chaetosphaeridium is a genus of green algae. Several classifications have been proposed. Its traditional classification is in the order Coleochaetales, related to the genus Coleochaete. AlgaeBase places it in the order Chaetosphaeridiales.

== Species ==
Species include:

- C. globosum (Nordst.) Kleb.
- C. huberi
- C. minus
- C. ovalis G.M.Smith, 1916
- C. pringsheimii Kleb.

GBIF only accepts Chaetosphaeridium globosum, Chaetosphaeridium ovalis and Chaetosphaeridium pringsheimii.
