= Good Morning Good Night =

Studio album by Sachiko M, Toshimaru Nakamura, & Otomo Yoshihide
- Released: 2004
- Recorded: August 2003
- Genre: Onkyo
- Length: 1:41:05
- Label: Erstwhile Records

Good Morning Good Night is a collaborative album by Sachiko M, Toshimaru Nakamura, and Otomo Yoshihide. It was released in 2004 by Erstwhile Records.

== Background ==
The music consists of sine waves produced by a sampler, mixing console feedback, and turntable-based sounds. The music is sparse and divided into several segments ranging from approximately 8 to 37 minutes in length.

== Track listing ==
No.	Title	Length
1.	"Good Morning"	30:12
2.	"Good Afternoon"	7:59
3.	"Good Evening"	25:34
4.	"Good Night"	37:20
Total length:		1:41:05

== Personnel ==
Adapted from Erstwhile Records

- Sachiko M – sine waves, sampler
- Toshimaru Nakamura – no-input mixing board
- Otomo Yoshihide – turntables, electronics

== Reception ==
Professional ratings
Review scores
Source	Rating
Sputnikmusic	4/5 stars
Pitchfork	7.3/10

The album was given a 7.3 by Pitchfork, with reviewer Dominique Leone praising the album for its complexity and meticulous instrumentation.
