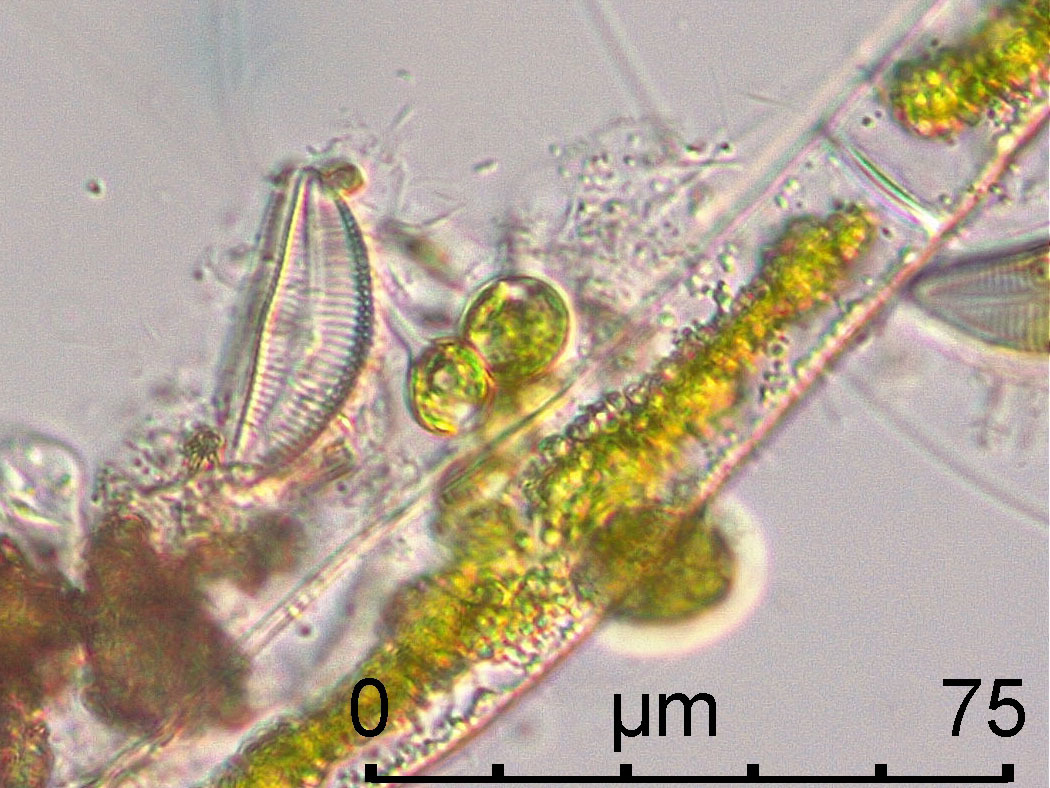

Scientific classification
- Clade: Viridiplantae
- Division: Charophyta
- Class: Coleochaetophyceae
- Order: Chaetosphaeridiales
- Family: Chaetosphaeridiaceae
- Genus: Chaetosphaeridium
- Species: C. globosum

Binomial name
- Chaetosphaeridium globosum (Nordst.) Kleb.

Synonyms
- Aphanochaete globosa (Nordst.) Wolle; Herposteiron globosum Nordst.

= Chaetosphaeridium globosum =

Species of alga

Chaetosphaeridium globosum is a species of green algae in the class Coleochaetophyceae. It is widely distributed and probably has a cosmopolitan distribution. Chaetosphaeridium globosum is a streptophyte, the lineage from which land plants evolved. Because of this, its genome is of considerable interest for the study of the evolution of plants.

Chaetosphaeridium globosum consists of solitary cells, or groups of cells connected to each other by their cell walls or by a common layer of mucilage. The cells are typically 11–18 μm in diameter, spherical to flask-shaped, and has a long bristle which is surrounded by a prominent tube or sheath at the base. Each cell contains one or two parietal, plate-like chloroplast.

Asexual reproduction occurs by biflagellate zoospores. Ultrastructurally, the flagella is covered in three-pronged scales, likened to a maple leaf. Sexual reproduction is oogamous, with small biflagellate male gametes and oogonia which are larger than vegetative cells.

One variety, var. depressum, is known from the British Isles; it differs from the typical variety in having somewhat depressed cells (8.5–9.5 μm high).

== Genomics ==
Researchers have found that the mitochondrial DNA of Chaetosphaeridium is markedly different from that of land plants, suggesting that the mitochondria of land plants evolved significantly after the common ancestor between them and living green algae. A very slight similarity exists between liverwort mtDNA and Chaetosphaeridium. The chloroplast DNA is markedly similar, however, indicating that a close relationship had existed between the Viridiplantae and the clade that includes Chaetosphaeridium. This seems to argue that chloroplasts in green plants originated in prehistoric green algae; the family which includes Chaetosphaeridium globosum.

Chloroplasts are known to be captured (symbiotic) cyanobacteria with their own genome. Part of this genome has been transferred to the nucleus and part has been retained in the chloroplast for the continuation of metabolic processes. This symbiosis, now proven by modern genomics, has shown us how Chaetosphaeridium globosum links ancient cyanobacteria with modern green plants.
