= Toshiya Tsunoda =

Japanese visual and musical artist

Toshiya Tsunoda 角田 俊也
- Born: 1964 (age 61–62); Yokohama, Kanagawa Prefecture, Japan
- Genres: Field recording; musique concrète; lowercase; noise music
- Occupations: sound artist; installation artist
- Years active: 1996–present
- Website: toshiya-tsunoda.blogspot.com

Toshiya Tsunoda (角田 俊也 Tsunoda Toshiya, born 1964) is a Japanese sound and installation artist based in Yokohama. Much of Tsunoda's field recording work intends to capture the character of spaces generally seen as inert through their subtle auditory characteristics, including those imperceptible to the naked ear. Vibrations, often recorded with contact microphones, thus feature prominently in his work.

Tsunoda holds an MFA in oil painting from Tokyo University of the Arts. In 1994, he co-founded the WrK record label with Minoru Sato (m/s), and released his first solo LP on the label in 1997.

== Discography ==
- Ful (with m/s; Selektion, 1996)
- Extract From Field Recording Archive #1 (WrK, 1997)
- Extract From Field Recording Archive #2: The Air Vibration Inside A Hollow (Häpna, 1999)
- Vibrational Movements Of Metal Plates / Limiting Feedback Oscillation (Ahora, 1999)
- Extract From Field Recording Archive #3: Solid Vibtration (Infringitive, 2001)
- Pieces Of Air (Lucky Kitchen, 2002)
- Untitled (with Civyiu Kkliu; Bremsstrahlung, 2003)
- O Respirar Da Paisagem (Sirr, 2003)
- Scenery of Decalcomania (Naturestrip, 2004)
- Kapotte Muziek By Toshiya Tsunoda (with Kapotte Muziek; Korm Plastics, 2004)
- English - Overland (with Joel Stern, Tarab, & Lawrence English; Naturestrip, 2004)
- Dertiende Mixer (Cleavage of Acoustics / Cacerolada) (with Justin Bennett; Stichting Mixer, 2004)
- Ridge Of Undulation (Häpna, 2005)
- Appearance Of Physical Vibration (Touch, 2005)
- Low Frequency Observed At Maguchi Bay (Hibari Music, 2007)
- The Argyll Recordings (edition.t, 2008)
- Santa (with Mitsuhiro Yoshimura and Taku Sugimoto; Presqu'ile Records, 2008)
- Michael Graeve / Toshiya Tsunoda (with Michael Graeve; edition.t, 2009 & Megalomania, Micromania, 2009)
- Familial Readings (with Luke Fowler; edition.t, 2009)
- Snared 60 Cuts (with Seijiro Murayama; Skiti, 2010)
- Crosshatches (with Michael Pisaro; Erstwhile Records, 2012)
- Ο Κόκκος Της Άνοιξης (edition.t, 2013)
- The Temple Recording (edition.t, 2013)
- TramVibration (with Haco; Skiti, 2013)
- Detour (with Manfred Werder; Erstwhile Records, 2014)
- Miyagawa Bay Sketches (self-released, 2014)
- Anabasis (with Michael Pisaro, Greg Stuart, Patrick Farmer, and Joe Panzner; Gravity Wave, 2014)
- Somashikiba (edition.t, 2016)
- Wovenland (with Taku Unami; Erstwhile Records, 2018)
- Extract From Field Recording Archive (ErstPast, 2019)
- Extract From Field Recording Archive: Reflection-Revisting (ErstPast, 2019)
- Wovenland 2 (with Taku Unami; Erstwhile Records, 2020)
- Landscape And Voice (Black Truffle, 2022)
- Wovenland 3 (Taku Unami; Erstwhile Records, 2024)

== Installations ==
- In Resonance (Bumbershoot Arts Festival, Seattle, 2005)
- Gray Water (with Lawrence English; Institute of Modern Art, Brisbane, 2007)
- Half Life (Kilmartin Glen, Kilmartin, 2007)
- Composition for Flutter Screen (with Luke Fowler; Yokohama Triennale, Yokohama, 2008)
- Composition for Flutter Screen #2 (with Luke Fowler; Serpentine Galleries, London, 2009)
- Geometric Form Seen in Recent Sound (with Michael Graeve; gkg, Bonn, 2010)
- Imprint/Field/Surface (with Luke Fowler; Kunstverein Bielefeld, Bielefeld, 2011)
- Ridges on the Horizontal Plane (with Luke Fowler; Galerie Gisela Capitain, Cologne, 2011)
- KIKOENAIOTO (Talion Gallery, Tokyo, 2012)
- Leader As Gutter (with Luke Fowler; Taka Ishii Gallery, Tokyo, 2013)
- Soundings: A Contemporary Score (Museum of Modern Art, New York, 2013)
- Trans/Real (with Ito Atsuhiro; curated by Gen Umezu; Gallery αM, Tokyo, 2016)

=== Group exhibitions ===
- 21:100:100 – One Hundred Sound Works by 100 Artists from the 21st Century (Gertrude Contemporary Art Spaces, Melbourne, 2008)
- Simple Interactions: Sound Art from Japan (Museet for Samtidskunst, Roskilde, 2011)

=== Live installations ===
The following is a list of venues where Toshiya Tsunoda has presented live installations.

- STUK Arts Centre (Leuven, 2010)
- SMART Project Space (Amsterdam, 2010)
- Rockbund Art Museum (Shanghai, 2013)
- Sealink Gallery (Hangzhou, 2013)
- Ftarri (with Luke Fowler; Tokyo, 2013)
- Liquid Architecture (Melbourne, 2013)
- ISSUE Project Room (Brooklyn, 2013)
- Gallery αM (Tokyo, 2016)
- SuperDeluxe (with Jarod Fowler; Tokyo, 2016)
