= Haco =

Japanese singer, composer

- Born: Kobe, Japan
- Genres: Avant-pop; electronic; experimental music; dream pop
- Occupations: Singer-songwriter; musician; record producer; sound designer
- Instruments: Vocals; sampler; synthesizer; guitar; electric mandolin; hand percussion
- Years active: 1981–present
- Labels: Recommended Records/ReR Megacorp; Tzadik Records; Room40; Improvised Music from Japan
- Website: www.hacohaco.net

Haco is a Japanese singer, composer, multi-instrumentalist and sound artist, known for her work with After Dinner and Hoahio, among others.

Following formal studies in acoustics, electronic music and recording technology in 1980, Haco came to international attention fronting the group After Dinner (active between 1981–1991), helped by their association with the "Rock in Opposition"-related label Recommended Records. Haco would later appear in Step Across the Border, a 1990 documentary film on Henry Cow's Fred Frith, as well as contributing music to the soundtrack.

Haco released her first solo album in 1995, and embarked on her first solo European tour a year later. More recently, Haco has worked with the groups Happiness Proof, Hoahio and Ash in the Rainbow, and has recorded or performed with countless other artists, such as David Toop, Otomo Yoshihide, Nobukazu Takemura, Pierre Bastien, Anthony Moore and Carl Stone.

In addition to her more conventional album releases Haco has also worked in the fields of sound art; curating exhibitions and installations and establishing the sound art project View Masters (with focus on the environmental sounds of daily life), later beginning the production and curation of a four-year series of View Masters lectures, concerts and workshops in 2002.

== Discography (albums as leader or co-leader) ==
- 1995 HACO (MIDI Creative, Japan; ReR Megacorp, UK; Detector, USA)
- 1999 Happiness Proof (P-Vine, Japan; ReR Megacorp, UK; Detector, USA)
- 2004 Stereo Bugscope 00 (Improvised Music from Japan, Japan) [awarded Honorary Mention in digital music category at Prix Ars Electronica 2005, Austria]
- 2007 Riska (Arcangelo/Disk Union, Japan)
- 2015 Secret Garden (Nuovo Immigrato, Japan)
- 2017 Qoosui (Someone Good/Room40, Australia)
- 2021 Novo Naturo (Someone Good/Room40, Australia)
- 2024 HACO (Remastered by Chihei Hatakeyama) (MIDI Creative, Japan)
- 2024 Another Souvenir: Solo Live in 2002 (Ftarri, Japan)

After Dinner

- 1984 After Dinner (originally released as Glass Tube in Japan; reissued 1991 with Live Editions) (ReR Megacorp, UK)
- 1988 Souvenir Cassette (Recommended Records, UK)
- 1989 Paradise of Replica (RecRec Music, Switzerland) (reissued 2001 with Paradise of Remixes) (ReR Megacorp, UK)
- 2019 The Souvenir Cassette and Further Live Adventures (CD reissue) (ReR Megacorp, UK; Fish Prints, USA)
- 2021 After Dinner: 1982-85 (vinyl reissue) (Soave Records, Italy)
- 2022 Paradise of Replica (vinyl reissue) (Aguirre Records, Belgium)

Hoahio

- 1997 Happy Mail (with Michiyo Yagi and Sachiko M) (Amoebic, Japan)
- 2000 Ohayo! Hoahio! (with Michiyo Yagi and Sachiko M) (Tzadik Records, US)
- 2003 Peek-Ara-Boo (with Michiyo Yagi and Mari Era) (Tzadik Records, US)

Kam-pas-nel-la

- 1998 Kam-pas-nel-la (with Kazuhisa Uchihashi, Zeena Parkins, and Samm Bennett) (Festival Beyond Innocence Live Performance Series Vol.1. FBI Works/Innocent, Japan)

Ash in the Rainbow

- 2003 Ash in the Rainbow (with Sakamoto Hiromichi) (ReR Megacorp, UK; Detector, USA)

Yesterday's Heroes

- 2004 1979 (with Terre Thaemlitz) (La Louche, France)

Synapse

- 2005 Raw (with Ikue Mori and Aki Onda) (CD, Tzadik Record, US)

Diane Labrosse, Martin Tetreault, and Haco

- 2005 Lunch in Nishinomiya (Improvised Music from Japan, Japan)

Haco, Takako Minekawa, Dustin Wong, and Tarnovski

- 2019 Kannazuki (Warm Winters Ltd., UK/Slovakia)

== Vocal contributions ==
- 2000 Acid Mothers Temple & The Melting Paraiso U.F.O.: Troubadours From Another Heavenly World (Squealer, Japan)
- 2001 Acid Mothers Temple & The Melting Paraiso U.F.O.: New Geocentric World of Acid Mothers Temple (Squealer, Japan)
- 2005 Stefano Panunzi feat. Haco: Web Of Memories (A Rose CD) (Emerald Recordings, Italy)
- 2009 Fjieri feat. Haco: Soul Eaters (produced by Richard Barbieri) (Forward Music, Italy)
