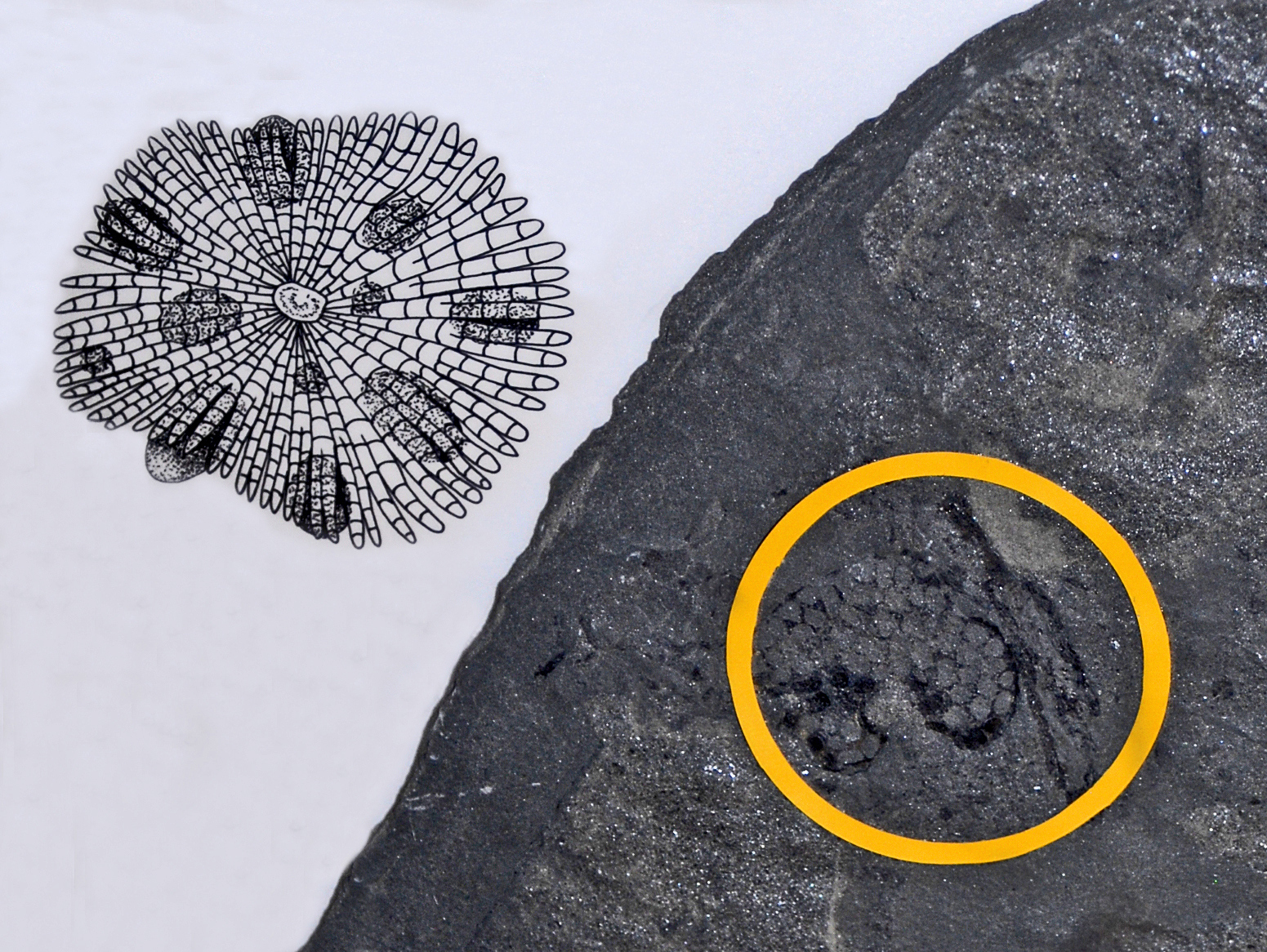
- Parka decipiens from the Devonian of Scotland

Scientific classification
- Kingdom: Plantae
- Class: Charophyceae (?)
- Order: Coleochaetales (?)
- Genus: †Parka
- Species: †P. decipiens

Binomial name
- †Parka decipiens Fleming (1831)

= Parka decipiens =

Parka decipiens Temporal range: Devonian

Devonian fossil, possibly of an extinct Charophyte alga

Parka decipiens is a Devonian fossil believed to be an early land plant, and is the only species described in the genus Parka. It bears at least a passing resemblance to the alga Coleochaete, but the significance of this similarity is yet to be established.

== Description ==
The fossils of Parka decipiens seem small circular, elliptic or irregular patches reaching a diameter of 0.5–7.5 centimetres (0.20–2.95 in), with a reticulate structure showing small coaly discs. These discs contain a mass of what could be spores. Ultrastructural examination of these spores has shown that they lack the y-shaped trilete mark, a Y-like scar, that is characteristic of Silurian and Devonian pteridophytes.
