= Haco (disambiguation) =

Haco is a Japanese singer

Haco may also refer to:

- Haakon IV of Norway, as in The Norwegian Account of King Haco's Expedition Against Scotland
- Ciwan Haco (born 1957) Kurdish singer
- Hertfordshire Association of Cultural Officers
