= Ami Yoshida =

Japanese musician

Ami Yoshida 吉田 アミ
- Born: May 13, 1976 (age 49)
- Origin: Japan
- Occupation: Musician
- Instrument: Vocals

Ami Yoshida (吉田 アミ, Yoshida Ami; born May 13, 1976) is a Japanese musician.

Yoshida does not play instruments, instead making her music with her own voice. Rather than conventional singing she makes a variety of vocalisations of such a nature that it is often hard to tell that the sounds are being produced by a voice at all. These sounds are sometimes subtly electronically altered. She describes her means of producing sound as the "howling voice".

Her records include Spiritual Voice (1997) and the thirteen track, four-minute EP . (2002, released on a business-card sized CD). Her 2003 release, Tiger Thrush on the Improvised Music from Japan label, includes 99 untitled tracks.

She has collaborated with a number of other musicians, among them Otomo Yoshihide, Sachiko M (with whom she performs as Cosmos) and Utah Kawasaki (with whom she makes up Astro Twin). Soba to Bara, a 2009 release on Erstwhile Records, found Yoshida and Toshimaru Nakamura (no-input mixing board) performing one 47-minute improvisation each and pairing the two recordings, each musician's part unheard by the other.
