= Espen Reinertsen =

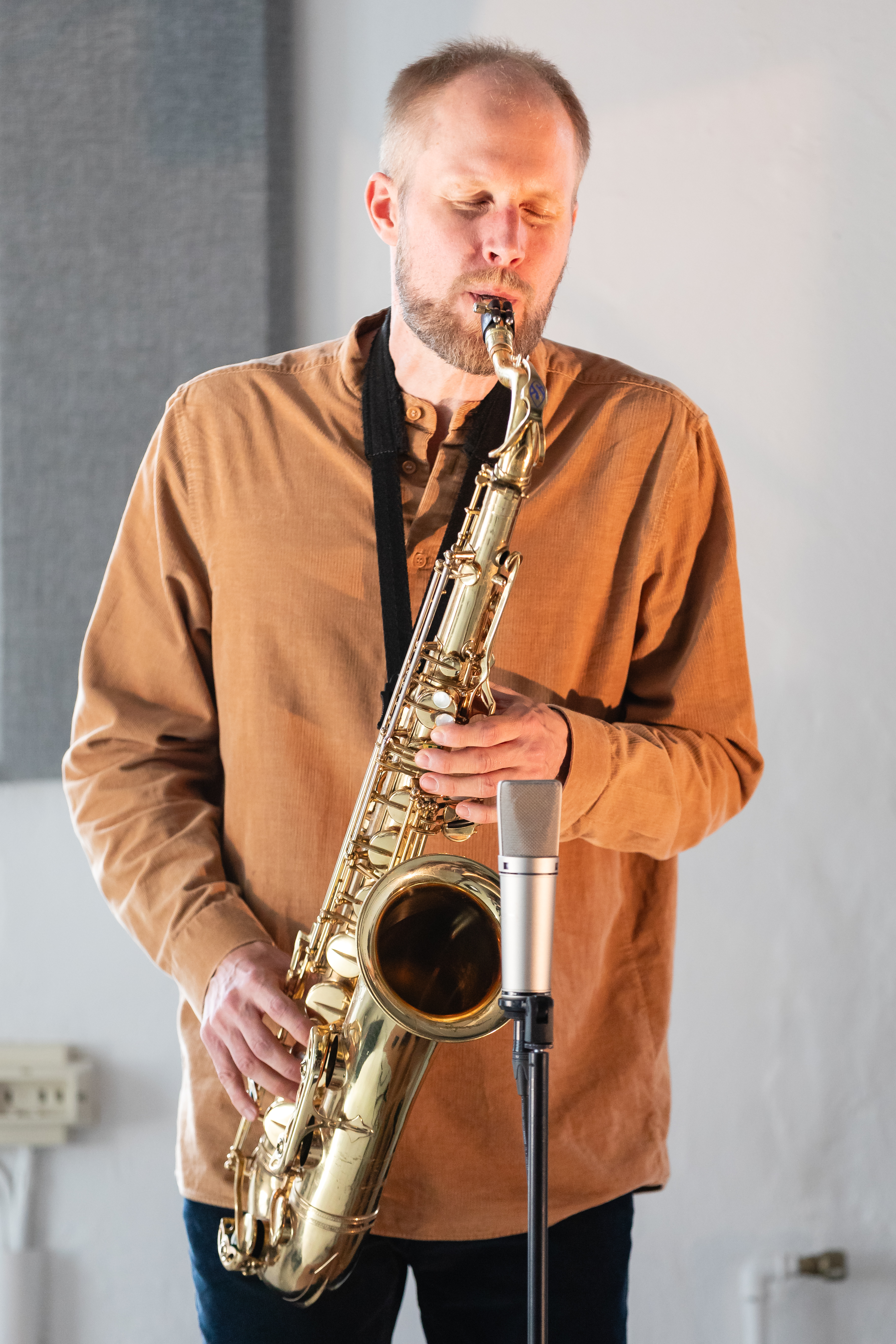
- Espen Reinertsen performing in Steinhuset, Kongsberg 2025; Photo: Tore Sætre

Background information
- Born: 1979 (age 46–47); Gran Municipality
- Origin: Norway
- Genres: Jazz, electronica, noise music
- Occupations: Musician, composer, producer
- Instruments: Saxophones, flute
- Labels: SusannaSonata, Sofa
- Website: www.espenreinertsen.no

Espen Reinertsen (born 1979 in Gran Municipality) is a Norwegian saxophonist, flutist, composer, and music producer.

== Biography ==
Reinertsen released his debut solo album in 2015 on the label of Susanna Wallumrød, SusannaSonata. He followed up with the album Nattsyntese on the same label.

== Honors ==
- 2010: De Unges Lindemanpris
- 2014: The Trondheim Jazz Festival Talent Award
- 2014: SpareBank 1 SMN JazZtipendiat

== Discography ==
=== Solo albums ===
- 2015: Forgaflingspop (SusannaSonata)
- 2017: Nattsyntese (SusannaSonata)

=== Collaborations ===
With Tetuzi Akiyama, Martin Taxt, Eivind Lønning

- 2008: Varianter Av Døde Trær (Sofa)

With Streifenjunko (Eivind Lønning duo)

- 2009: No Longer Burning (Sofa)

With Koboku Senjû (Toshimaru Nakamura, Tetuzi Akiyama, Eivind Lønning, Martin Taxt

- 2010: Selektiv Hogst (Sofa)
