= Filament =

The word filament, which is descended from Latin filum meaning "thread", is used in English for a variety of thread-like structures, including:

== Astronomy ==
- Galaxy filament, the largest known cosmic structures in the universe
- Solar filament, a solar prominence seen against the disc of the sun

== Biology ==
- Myofilament, filaments of myofibrils constructed from proteins
- Protein filament, a long chain of protein subunits, such as those found in hair or muscle
- Part of a stamen, the male part of a flower
- Hypha, a thread-like cell in fungi and Actinobacteria
- Filamentation, an elongation of individual bacterial cells

== Textiles ==
- Filament fiber, fiber that comes in a continuous long length
- Filament yarn, as opposed to spun yarn

== Arts and entertainment ==
- Filament (band), a musical group from Japan
- Filament (film), a 2002 movie by Japanese director Jinsei Tsuji
- Filament (magazine), a female-oriented erotica magazine
- Filament Games, a Wisconsin-based educational video game developer
- Filament Productions, a production design and touring video company

== Physics and engineering ==
- Electrical filament of incandescent light bulb
- Heater filament of a vacuum tube
- Current filament, an inhomogeneity in current flow
- Filament propagation, diffractionless propagation of a light beam
- LED filament, a light-emitting diode string, which resembles an incandescent light bulb filament
- 3D printing filament, printer raw material

== See also ==
- Monofilament (disambiguation)
