= Clemens Julius Mangner =

German architect

Clemens Julius Mangner, often C. J. Mangner in abbreviated form, (24 September 1885 – 19 December 1961) was a German architect who worked in his home town of Bonn and in what is now Wuppertal.

== Life ==
Born in Bonn, Mangner attended the Gymnasium Sedanstraße in the town of Barmen, which is now part of Wuppertal. He studied, among others, with Wilhelm Kreis in Düsseldorf. His architectural firm last ran a residential and office building in Barmen, built for himself according to his own plans. (An der Bergbahn 14). From there he also planned, among other things, residential buildings for Bonn's new citizens from the Ruhr area. In today's Wuppertal, Mangner was entrusted with the construction of settlements in housing cooperatives, including the Siedlung Frankenplatz (1912–1927). From 1920 onwards, he can be traced for a few years with an office in Bonn (Münsterplatz 19). In 1923 Mangner won an architectural design competition for the new construction of the Wuppertal Schwebebahnstation Hauptbahnhof (today Hauptbahnhof) as part of a redesign of Brausenwerther Platz and Döppersberger Brücke and was also commissioned with the implementation. He was a member of the Bund Deutscher Architekten, within which he was appointed chairman and later honorary chairman of the Wuppertal district group and the Düsseldorf district group, as well as for a time of the Deutscher Werkbund. Mangner also founded the Wuppertal section of the Rheinischer Verein für Denkmalpflege und Landschaftsschutz and became its first chairman. In 1925, he was appointed to the Deutsche Akademie für Städtebau und Landesplanung, for which he last served as secretary until 1955 and which appointed him an honorary member in 1960.

Mangner died in Wuppertal at the age of 76. and was buried at the Poppelsdorfer Friedhof in Bonn.

== Awards ==
- 24 September 1955: Order of Merit of the Federal Republic of Germany 1. Class.
- 1957: Cornelius-Gurlitt-Gedenkmünze der Deutsche Akademie für Städtebau und Landesplanung.

== Work ==
=== Buildings ===
Date	City District	Adresse	Picture	Object	Description	Notes
1912–1914	Wuppertal; Barmen	Schwerinstraße; 51.281851°N 7.194312°E	weitere Bilder	Siedlung Schwerinstraße	New building : Construction management (client: Allgemeine Baugenossenschaft Barmen)	Historic preservation
1912–1917	Wuppertal; Barmen	Seydlitzstraße, Zietenstraße, Bürgerallee	weitere Bilder	Siedlung Nordpark	New building (with August Hecker; client: Allgemeine Baugenossenschaft Barmen).	
1916	Assevent	Avenue du Maréchal de lattre 50.291505°N 4.0187°E	weitere Bilder	Franco-German military cemetery	Extension	
ca. 1920	Wuppertal; Elberfeld	Burgunderstraße 1–5; 51.266258°N 7.161876°E	weitere Bilder	Siedlung Frankenplatz: Group of three houses	New building (client: Gemeinnütziger Bauverein zu Elberfeld)	Historic preservation
ca. 1920	Wuppertal; Elberfeld	Frankenplatz 29/31; 51.265735°N 7.162084°E	weitere Bilder	Siedlung Frankenplatz: Residence	New building (client: Gemeinnütziger Bauverein zu Elberfeld)	Historic preservation
ca? 1920	Wuppertal; Elberfeld	Frankenplatz 33/35; 51.265638°N 7.162179°E	weitere Bilder	Siedlung Frankenplatz: Residence	New building (client: Gemeinnütziger Bauverein zu Elberfeld)	Historic preservation
1921	Bonn; Bad Godesberg	Rolandstraße 45; 50.726524°N 7.107233°E		Villa	New building	Historic preservation
1921	Wuppertal; Barmen	Sedanstraße		Memorial for the fallen of the Gymnasium Sedanstraße.	New building	1967 by Eugen Busmann
1921	Wuppertal; Elberfeld	Frankenplatz 6; 51.265421°N 7.160649°E	weitere Bilder	Siedlung Frankenplatz: Residence	New building (with Ernst Bast; client: Gemeinnütziger Bauverein zu Elberfeld)	Historic preservation
1921	Wuppertal; Elberfeld	Frankenplatz 13; 51.265988°N 7.161128°E	weitere Bilder	Siedlung Frankenplatz: Residence	Historic preservation	
1921–1922	Wuppertal; Elberfeld	Friesenstraße 9–13; 51.264912°N 7.161160°E	weitere Bilder	Siedlung Frankenplatz: Group of three houses	New building (client: Gemeinnütziger Bauverein zu Elberfeld)	Historic preservation
1926	Wuppertal; Vohwinkel	Gustav-Freytag-Straße 10/12; 51.238596°N 7.086950°E	weitere Bilder	Duplex house.	New building	
1926	Wuppertal; Barmen	At Bergbahn 14; 51.266722°N 7.201921°E	weitere Bilder	Residential and office building C. J. Mangner.	New building	Partly destroyed during the war (1943)
1927	Wuppertal; Barmen	Wettinerstraße 50–56; 51.252885°N 7.196347°E	weitere Bilder	Residences.	New building (client: Bergische Terraingesellschaft).	
1927/1928	Wuppertal; Barmen	Schubertstraße 42; 51.264719°N 7.215285°E	weitere Bilder	Residence.	New building	
1951/1952	Wuppertal; Vohwinkel	Stackenbergstraße 21; 51.233565°N 7.078761°E	weitere Bilder	Residence.	New building (with Wolf Rückle).	
1954/1955	Wuppertal; Barmen	Alter Markt 26–28; 51.271007°N 7.196963°E	weitere Bilder	Residential and commercial building with cinema Europa.	Renovation (?) Client: Kurt Preschner	

=== Miscellaneous ===
- After 1910: Wuppertal, overall development plan for the north-west slope of the Hardt (Siedlung Frankenplatz).
- 1920: Wuppertal, Development plan for the Lüntenbeck housing estate in the same-named residential quarter (commissioned by the Gartenheim-Bund).
