= Luke Fowler =

British film director (born 1978)

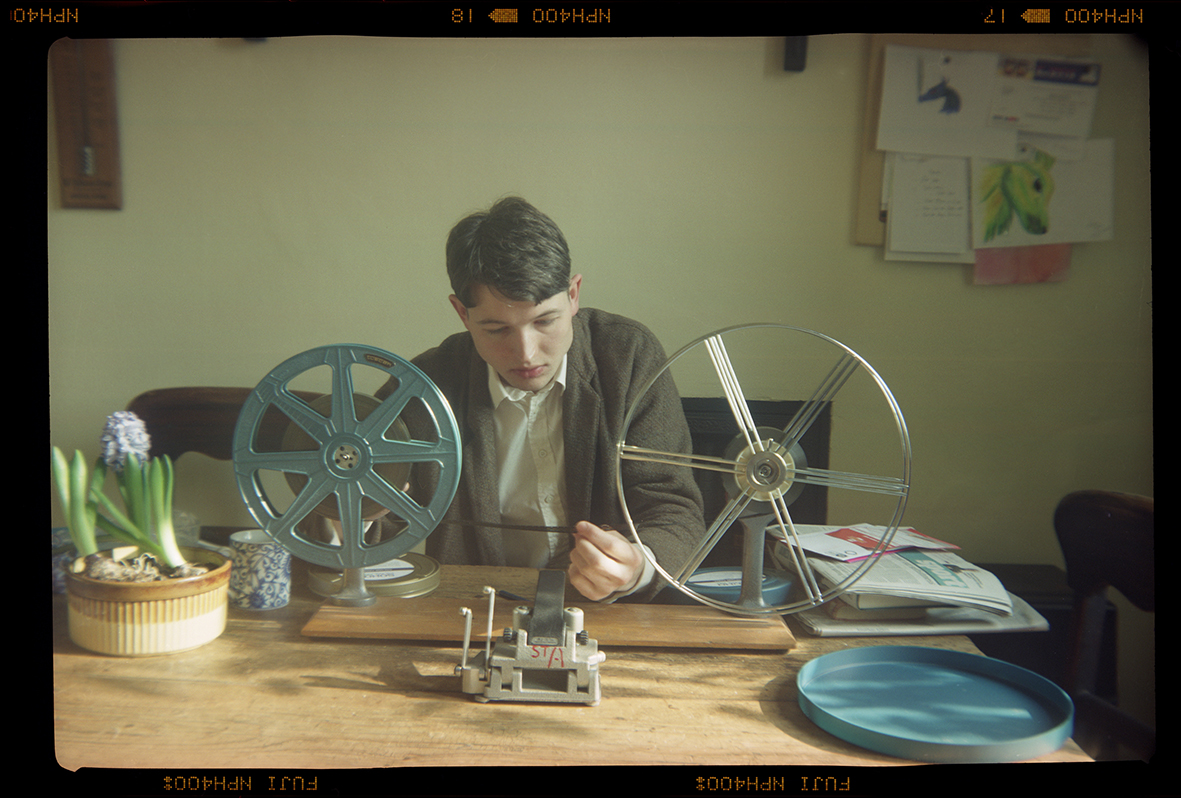
- Luke Fowler photographed in 2015 by Alan Dimmick
- Occupations: Artist; 16mm filmmaker; musician
- Website: luke-fowler.com

Luke Fowler (born 1978) is an artist, 16mm filmmaker and musician based in Glasgow. Fowler was a fellow at the Harvard Radcliffe Institute in 2015–2016

== Work ==
Fowler studied printmaking at Duncan of Jordanstone College of Art and Design in Dundee. His work explores the limits and conventions of biographical and documentary film-making with an emphasis on sound, marginalised communities and radical voices. Fowler is represented by The Modern Institute (Glasgow), Galerie Gisela Capitain (Cologne), and Taka Ishii Gallery (Tokyo).

=== Film work ===
He creates cinematic collages that have often been linked to the British Free Cinema movement of the 1950s, as well as traditions within American and British experimental cinema. He has collaborated or been in dialogue with the filmmakers: Lis Rhodes, Cerith Wyn Evans, Peter Todd, William Raban, Robert Beavers, and Peter Hutton. His para-documentary films have explored counter cultural figures including Scottish psychiatrist R. D. Laing, English composer Cornelius Cardew, Marxist-Historian E. P. Thompson and Scottish film-poet Margaret Tait (Being in a place). In 2018, Fowler created Mum’s Cards, a short 16 mm film exploring the archival index cards accumulated by his mother, sociologist Bridget Fowler, reflecting on memory, intellectual life, and the material traces of knowledge. In 2022, Fowler directed Being in a Place – A Portrait of Margaret Tait, an experimental documentary drawing on archival footage, recordings, notebooks, and correspondence to explore the life, work, and poetic approach to cinema of Scottish filmmaker and poet Margaret Tait, with attention to her relationship to the Orkney landscape. The film premiered in the Forum section of the 73rd Berlin International Film Festival.

=== Films on Sound and installations ===
Fowler’s work frequently engages with sound, the politics of music, and the communities in which music is produced and circulated. This interest is evident in his portraits of musicians and composers including Brunhild Ferrari, Patrick Cowley, Christian Wolff, and Martin Bartlett, as well as in films and installations that address place (The Room, Being Blue, Enceindre, Tenement Films, On Weaving) and acoustic phenomena (Ridges on the Horizontal Plane and Composition for Flutter Screen, both made in collaboration with Toshiya Tsunoda).

=== Musical projects ===
Fowler formed the duo Lied Music with John W. Fail, performing live music concrete The duo collaborated and performed live with Mark Vernon and Barry Burns, releasing two LPs. Since 2010, he has collaborated regularly with Richard Youngs, resulting in the box set Research Musics En-Of 50 and the avant-disco group AMOR, which released two 12″ records, an LP, and an EP on Nightschool Records.

=== Collaborations ===
Fowler has worked with a number of collaborators, including Sue Tompkins (Be Dear Crazy Loud, 2003; Country Grammar, 2017), David Grubbs (J’ai pensé sans parole), Ryoko Akama (installation and performance at Hamburg papiripar festival 2025), David Toop, Lionel Marchetti (soundtracks for Being In A Place 2022 and No Interior 2023), Corin Sworn (On Weaving, 2025), Margaret Salmon (To The Editor…, 2014), Marcus Schmickler, Eric La Casa, George Clark and Peter Hutton, Mark Fell, Lee Patterson, Toshiya Tsunoda, and Richard Youngs. He collaborated with guitarist Keith Rowe and film maker and curator Peter Todd on the live sound and film work The Room.

== Partial filmography ==
Year	Title	Duration
2025	On Weaving	26 minutes
2024	Being Blue	18 minutes
2023	N’importe Quoi	9 minutes
2022	Being in a Place – A Portrait of Margaret Tait	61 minutes
2021	For Dan	12 minutes
2020	Patrick	21 minutes
2019	Cézanne	6 minutes
2018	Mum’s Cards	9 minutes
2017	Electro-Pythagoras (a portrait of Martin Bartlett)	45 minutes
2016	For Christian	6 minutes
2014	To The Editor Of Amateur Photographer	68 minutes
2012	The Poor Stockinger, the Luddite Cropper and the Deluded Followers of Joanna Southcott	61 minutes
2011	All Divided Selves	93 minutes
2006	Pilgrimage from Scattered Points	44 minutes

== Selected exhibitions ==
=== Solo ===
- 2022: Being in a Place, The Modern Institute, 3 Aird's Lane, Glasgow
- 2021: From Here a Home Was Imagined, CCA, Glasgow
- 2021: A Certain Predilection for Things Out of the Ordinary, Museo Nacional Centro de Arte Reina Sofía, Madrid
- 2019: Passages, Adam Art Gallery, Victoria University of Wellington, Wellington
- 2018: Sightings: Luke Fowler, Nasher Sculpture Center, Dallas
- 2017: Gone Reflections, Lismore Castle Arts, Lismore
- 2015: Outside The Sound, Harvard Film Archive, Cambridge
- 2013: Common Sense, La Casa Encendida, Madrid
- 2011: Luke Fowler, Hessel Museum of Art, Center for Curatorial Studies, Bard College, New York
- 2010: No 5, Bergen Kunsthall, Bergen
- 2009: retrospective exhibition, Serpentine Gallery
- 2006: The Nine Monads Of David Bell, Villa Concordia, Bamberg

=== Group ===
- 2023: Luke Fowler (SCOT) & Kasper Akhøj (DK), Stereo Exchange, Frederiksberg
- 2022: Citational Choices, La Trobe Art Institute, Bendigo
- 2020: Miraculous Noise, Viborg Kunsthal, Viborg
- 2018: Wilderness, Schirn Kunsthalle, Frankfurt
- 2011: British Art Show 7, Hayward Gallery, London
- 2012: he was shortlisted for the Turner Prize, for solo exhibition at Inverleith House in Edinburgh, which showcased his new film exploring the life and work of Scottish psychiatrist R.D. Laing.

== Awards ==
- 2023: La Scam International Award, Cinéma du Réel, Paris
- 2019: Glasgow Short Film Festival Award for Best Film – Mum’s Cards
- 2012: Turner Prize, shortlisted
- 2010: Paul Hamlyn Award
- 2010: Donald Dewar Arts award
- 2010: Foundation for Contemporary Arts Grants to Artists Award
- 2008: Derek Jarman Award
- 2004: Shortlisted for the 2005 Beck's Futures prize
