= Monofilament =

A monofilament may refer to:

- Monofilament fishing line, a type of thread
- A monofilament as used in a monofilament test in a neurological examination
- Monomolecular wire, a theoretical type of wire consisting of a single strand of molecules

== See also ==
- filament (disambiguation)
