= Johannes Busmann =

German publisher

Johannes Busmann (born 20 May 1961) is a German university lecturer and publisher.

== Life and work ==
=== Academic career ===
Born in Wuppertal, Busmann passed his Abitur at today's Carl-Fuhlrott-Gymnasium in Wuppertal, then studied art, music and philosophy at the University of Wuppertal. He then worked as a research assistant and in 1993 obtained his doctorate to Dr. phil. in art history with the topic The Architect Alfons Leitl 1909–1975. The Revised Modernism. He was appointed as professor for media design and its didactics at the Wuppertal University in 2005.

=== Activities as editor, publisher and owner of an agency ===
In 1990, he founded the magazine Polis – Zeitschrift für Stadt und Baukultur, where he serves as publisher and editor-in-chief. The quarterly magazine has the current title Polis – Magazine for Urban Development and is distributed throughout Europe. In the same year, he founded the publishing house Müller + Busmann GmbH & Co. KG. Busmann founded the agency logos "Kommunikation und Gestaltung" in 1994. Then, in 2001, he founded the architecture magazine "build Das Architekten-Magazin", which was published bimonthly until 2014 and for which he served as publisher and editor-in-chief.

Busmann was publishing director of the architecture publishing house in the Rudolf Müller publishing group in Cologne from 2000 to 2001.

=== Other activities ===
In 2002 Busmann became an appointed member of the German Academy for Urban and Regional Planning (DASL)/NRW and in 2004 member and head of the Forum Marketing in the German Council of Shopping Centers/ Ludwigsburg. He has been a member of the Board of Trustees of the Carl Richard Montag Förderstiftung since 2005. In the same year, he was appointed chairman of the supervisory board of HHS Hegger Hegger Schleiff Architekten AG.

From January 2000 to May 2002, he worked as a project officer for the city of Wuppertal on the site development of the major urban development project of the Döppersberg inner city. He was reappointed in a similar capacity by the city of Wuppertal in February 2014.
