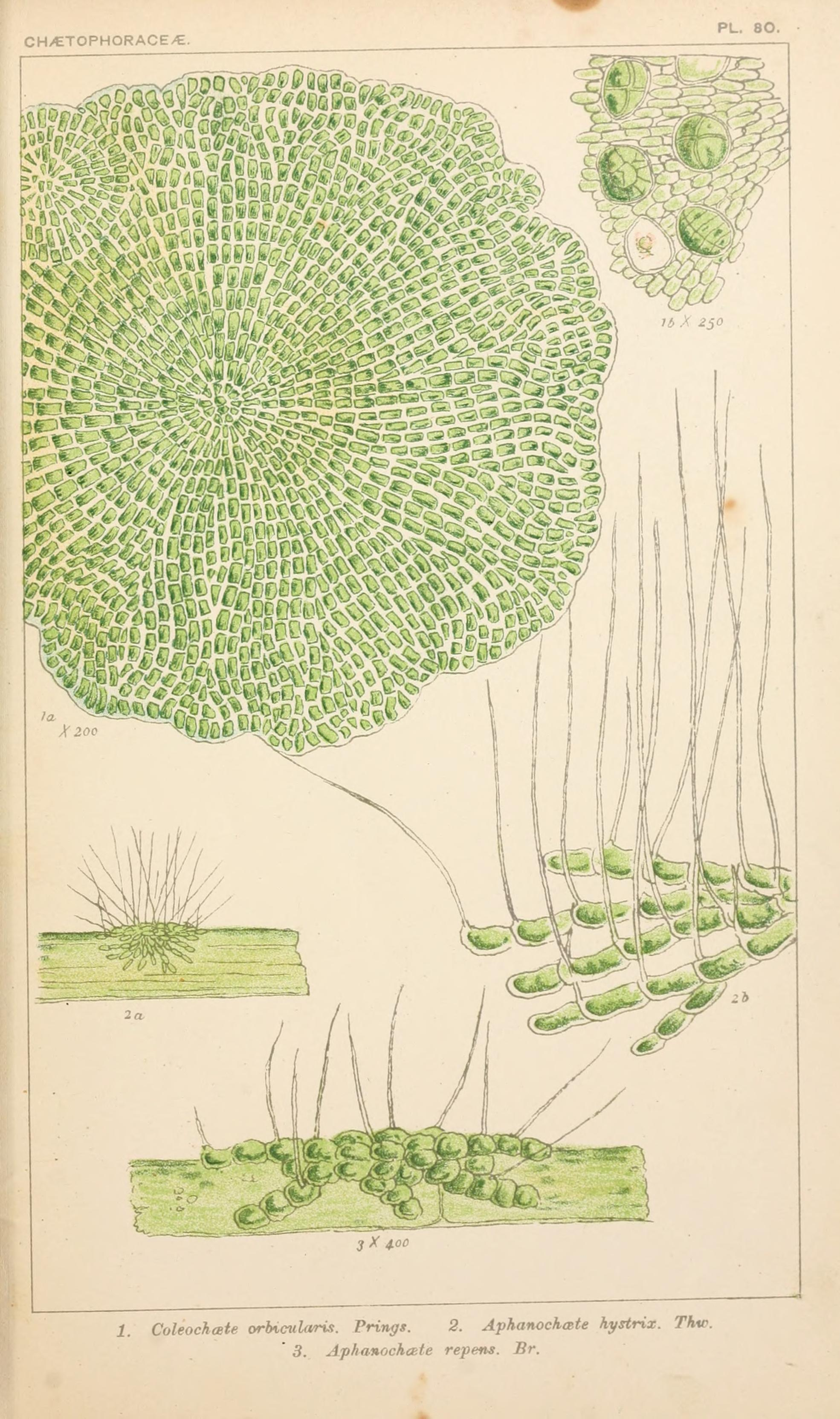
- Coleochaete sp.

Scientific classification
- Clade: Viridiplantae
- (unranked): Charophyta
- Class: Coleochaetophyceae
- Order: Coleochaetales
- Family: Coleochaetaceae
- Genus: Coleochaete; Brebisson

= Coleochaete =

Genus of algae

Coleochaete is a genus of parenchymatous charophyte green algae in the order Coleochaetales. They are haploid, reproduce both sexually and asexually, and have true multicellular organisation, with plasmodesmata communicating between adjacent cells. The plants form flat, sprawling discs on solid surfaces in freshwater streams worldwide, usually as epiphytes on aquatic plants or growing on the surface of stones. They are seen as one of two most probable sister groups to land plant species, the second candidate group being the Characeae. The issue is still not resolved. As they show some of the earliest and simplest features of multicellular plant growth, they are ideal model organisms in the field of synthetic biology. They are easy to culture and techniques that have been used to study Arabidopsis thaliana are now being applied to Coleochaete.

Coleochaete has a sterile jacket of cells that surround the gametangia and zygotes that are protected by a layer of sterile cells after fertilization. However, unlike land plants, Coleochaete has zygotic meiosis, meiosis taking place directly in the zygote and not in diploid cells resulting from mitotic division of the zygote.

== Species ==
- Coleochaete divergens ("Report". Integrated Taxonomic Information System.)
- Coleochaete irregularis ("Report". Integrated Taxonomic Information System.)
- Coleochaete nitellarum ("Report". Integrated Taxonomic Information System.)
- Coleochaete orbicularis ("Report". Integrated Taxonomic Information System.)
- Coleochaete pulvinata ("Report". Integrated Taxonomic Information System.)
- Coleochaete sampsonii ("Report". Integrated Taxonomic Information System.)
- Coleochaete scutata ("Report". Integrated Taxonomic Information System.)
- Coleochaete soluta ("Report". Integrated Taxonomic Information System.)
