= Michiyo Yagi =

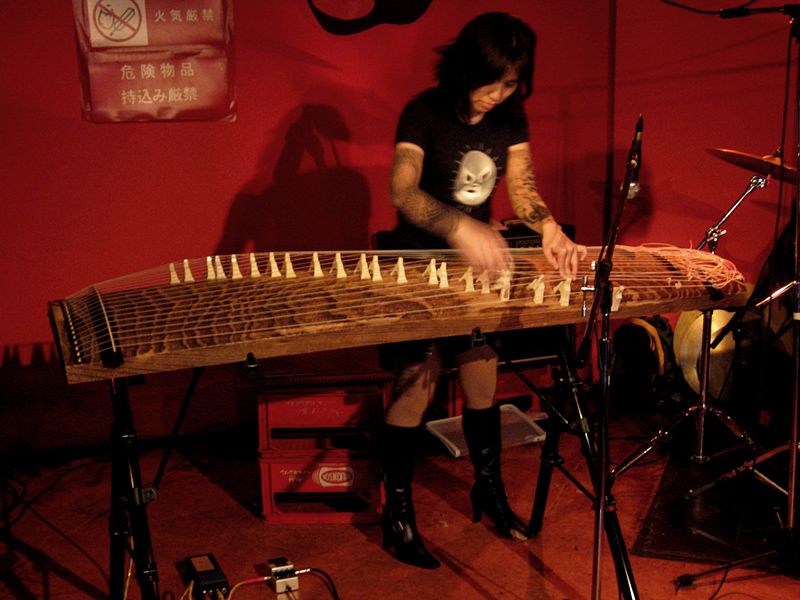
- Michiyo Yagi playing a 21-string koto

Background information
- Born: Tokoname, Aichi
- Genres: Traditional Japanese music, jazz, free improvisation, progressive rock, contemporary classical music
- Occupations: Musician, educator
- Instruments: koto (21-string, 17-string, 18-string, 13-string), shamisen, electronics, voice
- Years active: 1986–present
- Labels: Idiolect, Tzadik, Zipangu, East Works Entertainment / BAJ

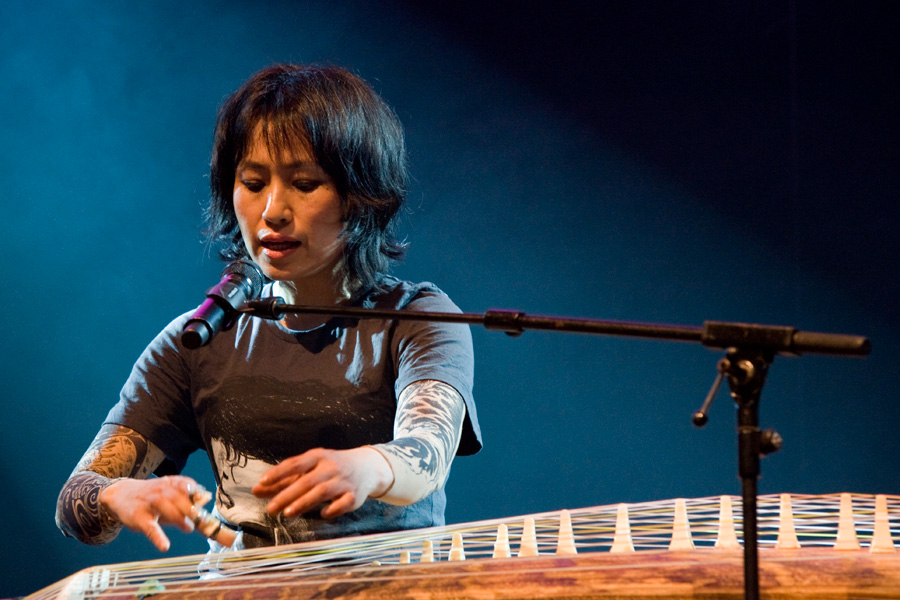
Michiyo Yagi, Moers Festival 2011

Michiyo Yagi (八木美知依, Yagi Michiyo), a Japanese musician who studied koto under Tadao Sawai, Kazue Sawai and Satomi Kurauchi, and graduated from the NHK Professional Training School for Traditional Musicians. Between 1989 and 1990, during her tenure as visiting professor of music at Wesleyan University in Connecticut, U.S.A., she premiered numerous modern compositions for koto and came under the influence of maverick American composers such as John Cage, Conlon Nancarrow, and John Zorn. Her solo koto CD Shizuku was produced by Zorn and released on the Tzadik label in 1999. In 2001 she recorded "Yural" with her koto ensemble Paulownia Crush for the East Works label. Under the auspices of the Japan Foundation, Yagi toured Russia with this ensemble in the fall of 2004.

An eclectic musician, Yagi has frequently appeared on Japanese TV and has performed at the Moers Jazz, Festival International de Musique Actuelle de Victoriaville, Archipel, Bang on a Can, Tokyo Summer, Vision, Punkt, Instal, Music Unlimited, Météo-Mulhouse, Born Creative, and Jazztopad Festivals. Yagi's koto has been featured in ex-Judy and Mary guitarist/singer Takuya's rock band, and she has recorded and appeared onstage with Ayumi Hamasaki, one of Japan's best-selling pop singers. Yagi was a founding member of the quartet Koto Vortex with fellow Sawai apprentices Yoko Nishi, Miki Maruta and Etsuko Takezawa, as well as Kokoo, a trio which performs originals and progressive rock covers exclusively on traditional Japanese instruments. She was also one-third of the avant-pop girl group Hoahio which recorded two CD's for Tzadik.

Yagi is one of the few improvising koto players on the international stage. She has performed with Eivind Aarset, Mark Dresser, John Zorn, Peter Brötzmann, Elliott Sharp, Han Bennink, Akira Sakata, Kazuhisa Uchihashi (Altered States), Natsuki Kido (Bondage Fruit), Fred Frith, Chris Cutler, Otomo Yoshihide, Bugge Wesseltoft, Saadet Türköz, Ned Rothenberg, Hoppy Kamiyama, Samm Bennett, Yuji Katsui (Rovo), Lauren Newton, Hans Reichel, Sabu Toyozumi, Mino Cinelu, Satoko Fujii, Joëlle Léandre, Tatsuya Yoshida (Ruins), Bill Laswell, Kazutoki Umezu, Carl Stone, Kang Tae Hwan, Christian Marclay, Koichi Makigami, Zeena Parkins, Masahiko Satoh, Billy Bang, Keiji Haino, Jason Roebke, Sachiko M, Ingebrigt Håker Flaten, Paal Nilssen-Love, MZN3 (Kjetil Møster, Per Zanussi, Kjell Nordeson), Chris Mosdell, Steven Wilson (Porcupine Tree), WHO Trio, Mani Neumeier, The Geordie Approach, Chrome Hill, Hamid Drake (Jazztopad Festival Wroclaw /Poland 2022, and others.

Among Yagi's post-Tzadik recordings are Seventeen, entirely performed on the giant 17-string koto; Live! at SuperDeluxe, a trio session with Flaten and Nilssen-Love; Head On and Volda as a member of the trio Brötzmann/Yagi/Nilssen-Love; Reflexions, a duo album with guitarist Elliott Sharp; Ichi no Maki and Ni no Maki by Dōjō, her duo with drummer Tamaya Honda; and Into The Forest featuring Yagi on kotos and vocals, with instrumental support from members of her Double Trio.

== Discography (as leader or co-leader) ==
- 1994: Koto Vortex I: Works by Hiroshi Yoshimura (Dainippon Katei Ongakukai / Paradise)
- 1996: Koto Vortex II: Arcadia (Dainippon Katei Ongakukai / Paradise)
- 1997: Hoahio: Happy Mail (Amoebic)
- 1999: Shizuku (Tzadik)
- 2000: Hoahio: Ohayo! Hoahio! (Tzadik)
- 2001: Yural with Paulownia Crush (East Works Entertainment / BAJ)
- 2003: Hoahio: Peek-Ara-Boo! (Tzadik)
- 2005: Seventeen (Zipangu)
- 2006: Live! at SuperDeluxe with Ingebrigt Håker Flaten and Paal Nilssen-Love (Idiolect)
- 2008: Head On with Peter Brötzmann and Paal Nilssen-Love (Idiolect)
- 2009: Volda with Peter Brötzmann and Paal Nilssen-Love (Idiolect)
- 2010: Reflexions with Elliott Sharp (Idiolect)
- 2014: Dōjō: Ichi no Maki (Vol. 1) with Tamaya Honda (Idiolect)
- 2015: Soul Stream with Joe McPhee, Paal Nilssen-Love and Lasse Marhaug (PNL)
- 2015: Angular Mass with Paal Nilssen-Love and Lasse Marhaug
- 2017: Dōjō: Ni no Maki (Vol. 2) with Tamaya Honda (Idiolect)
- 2017: Decayed with Ingebrigt Håker Flaten, Paal Nilssen-Love and Henry Kaiser (Idiolect)
- 2019: Into The Forest (Mori no Naka e) with Tamaya Honda, Noritaka Tanaka and Takashi Sugawa (Idiolect)
