= Eugen Busmann =

German sculptor

Eugen Felix Busmann (28 December 1929 – 25 February 2015) was a German sculptor and academic teacher.

== Life and work ==
Busmann was born in Emsdetten. He served his apprenticeship and practical years as a stonemason and sculptor from 1947 until 1952 at the Bauhütte in the Münster Cathedral. He then studied applied and free sculpture (1956–1957) as a Meisterschüler at the Fachbereich Design der Fachhochschule Münster under Kurt Schwippert). From 1957, Busmann was a lecturer in plastic design at the Werkkunstschule Wuppertal and thus followed Schwippert to Wuppertal. The Werkkunstschule was initially merged into the Wuppertal Comprehensive University in 1974, which has been called the University of Wuppertal since 2003. Busmann held a professorship at the university until his retirement in 1995. In addition to teaching at the university, Busmann produced free and commissioned sculptural works, focusing on columns and steles as well as small sculptures and plaques.

For over 50 years, Busmann was a member of the Bergische Kunstgenossenschaft (BKG) and of the Westdeutscher Künstlerbund. Since 1954, he participated in solo and group exhibitions in Germany and abroad.

Busmann lived in Wuppertal-Ronsdorf where he died at the age of 85.

== Work ==
- 1961: Contribution to the memorial plaque for the victims of the Second World War in the Rathaus Barmen, which was designed by Kurt Schwippert.
- 1962: Plaques commemorating the Wuppertal synagogues designed by Kurt Schwippert.
- 1966/67: Contributed to the artistic cast aluminium entrance portal on the old HC building of the Haspel campus (demolished in 2011), designed by Guido Jendritzko (1925-2009).
- 1967: Gravestone for the painter and sculptor Eduard Dollerschell at the time in the Sonnborn Catholic cemetery, from 1982 in the Niederberg Museum in Wülfrath.
- 1967: Commemorative plaque for those who died in the Second World War at the Sedanstraße Municipal Grammar School (additional plaque to the memorial by C. J. Mangner from 1921).
- 1971: Bronze plaque and design of the Wilhelm Vorwerk plant on the Höhenweg in the Barmer Forest.
- 1973: Terrain I. (in the Sammlung von der Heydt).
- 1973: Arena I. (in the von der Heydt-Museum).
- 1980/81: Bronze relief Cross Landscape in the forum of the St. Anna School in Elberfeld.
- 1988: Relief portrait of the company owner Hermann Quante († 1985) in the entrance area of the development and production centre of the Quante company on Uellendahler Straße.
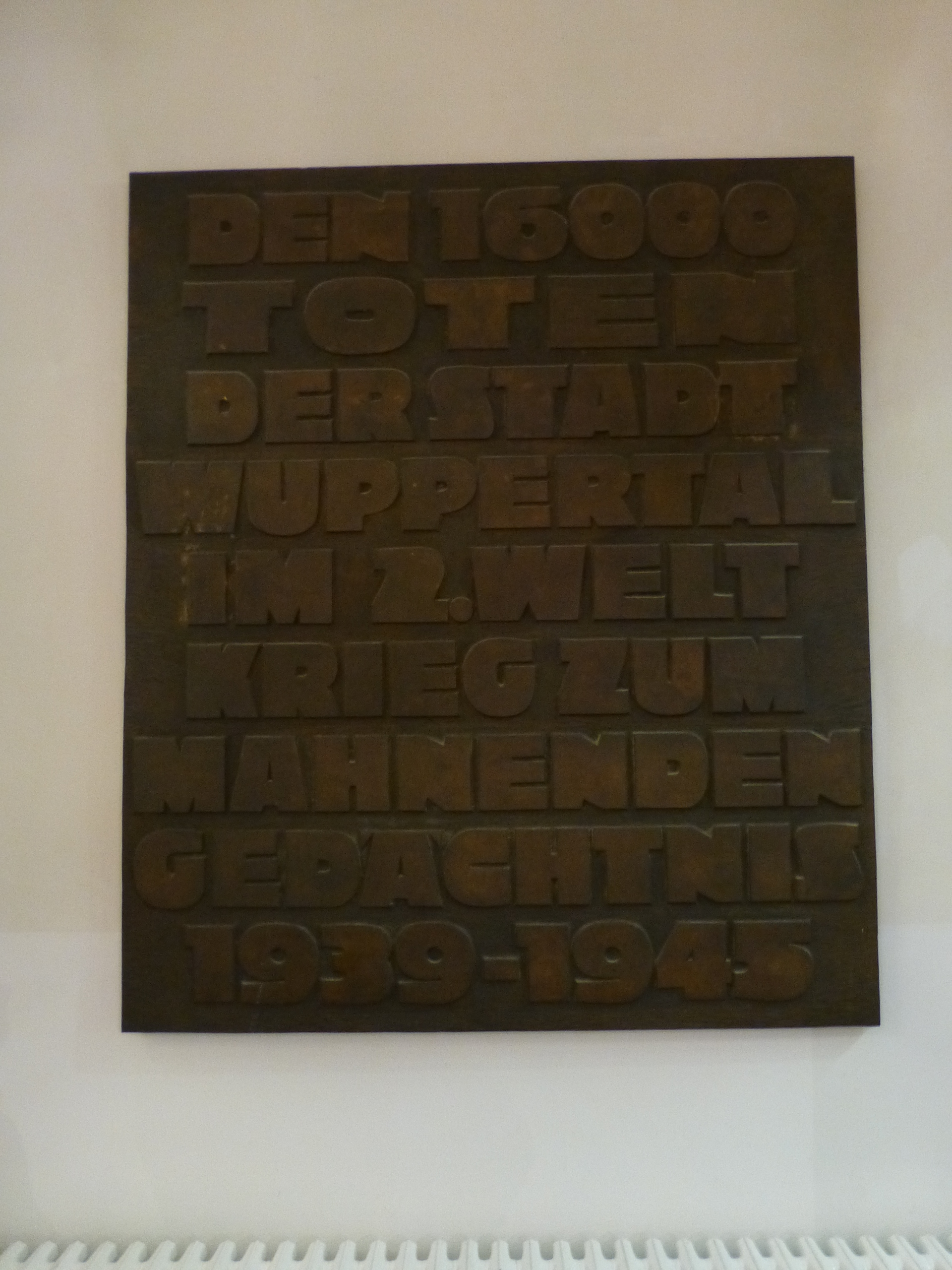
Gedenktafel für die Opfer des Zweiten Weltkriegs im Barmer Rathaus

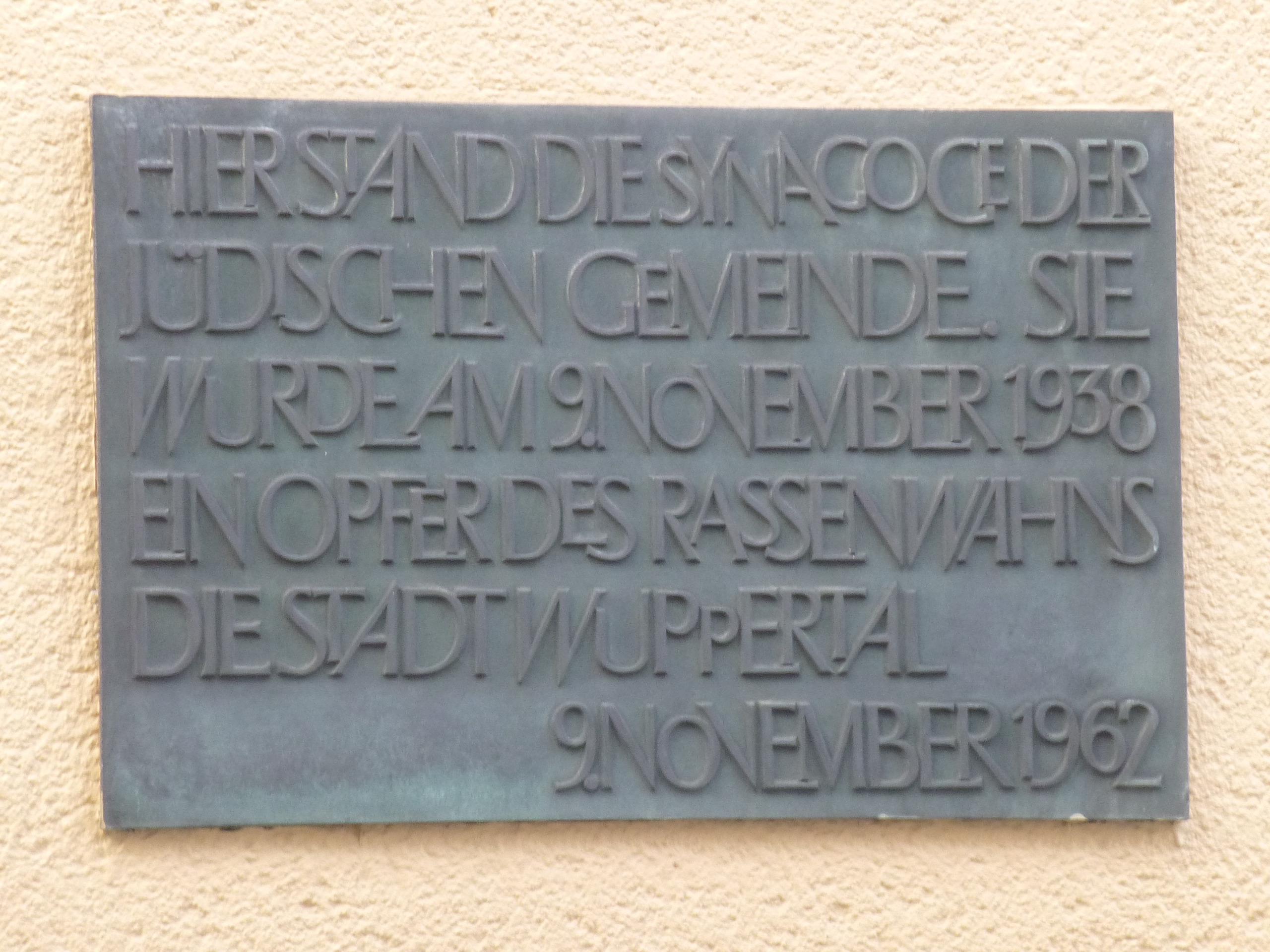
Gedenktafeln zur Erinnerung an die Barmer Synagoge

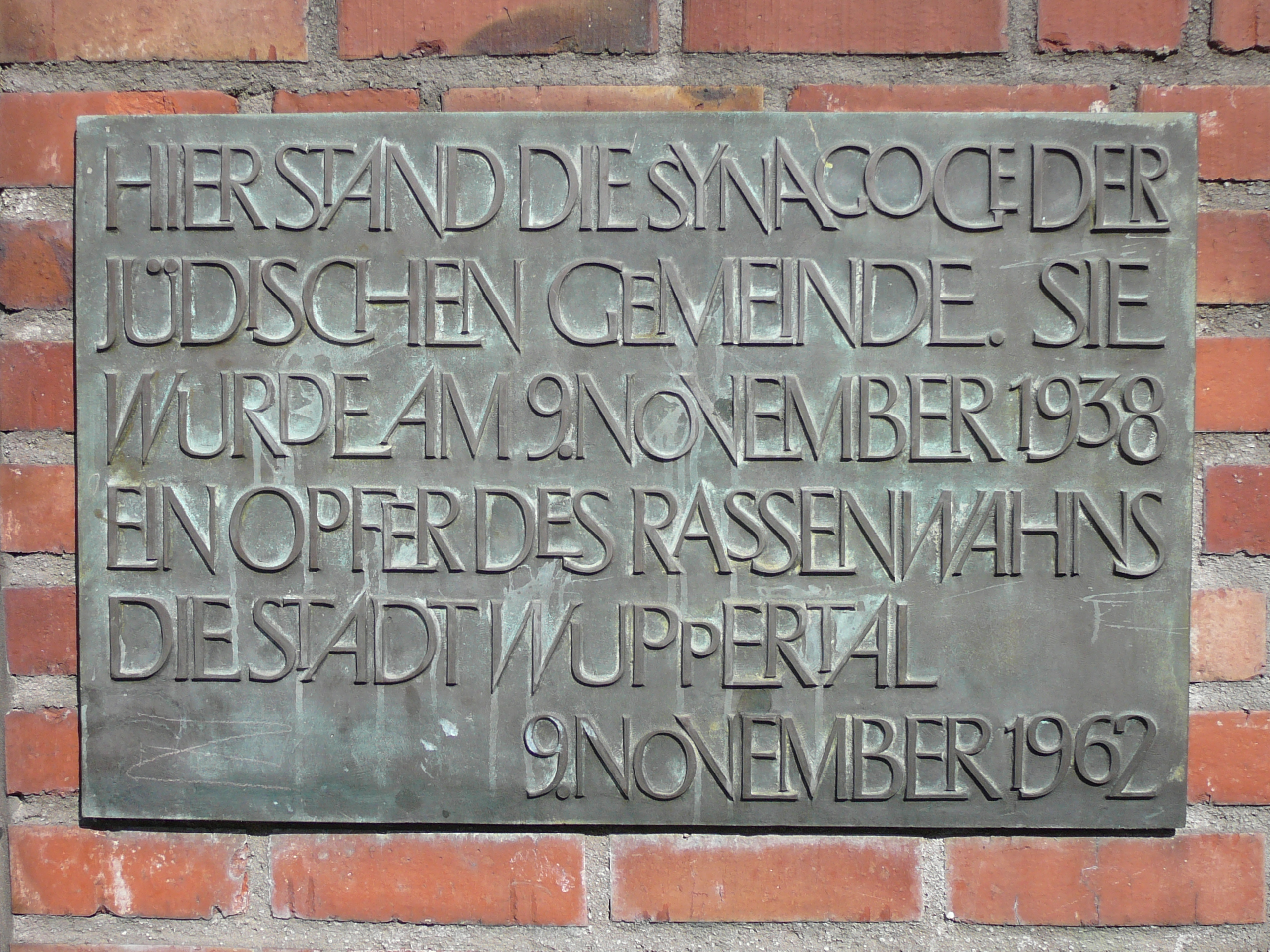
Gedenktafeln zur Erinnerung an die Elberfelder Synagoge

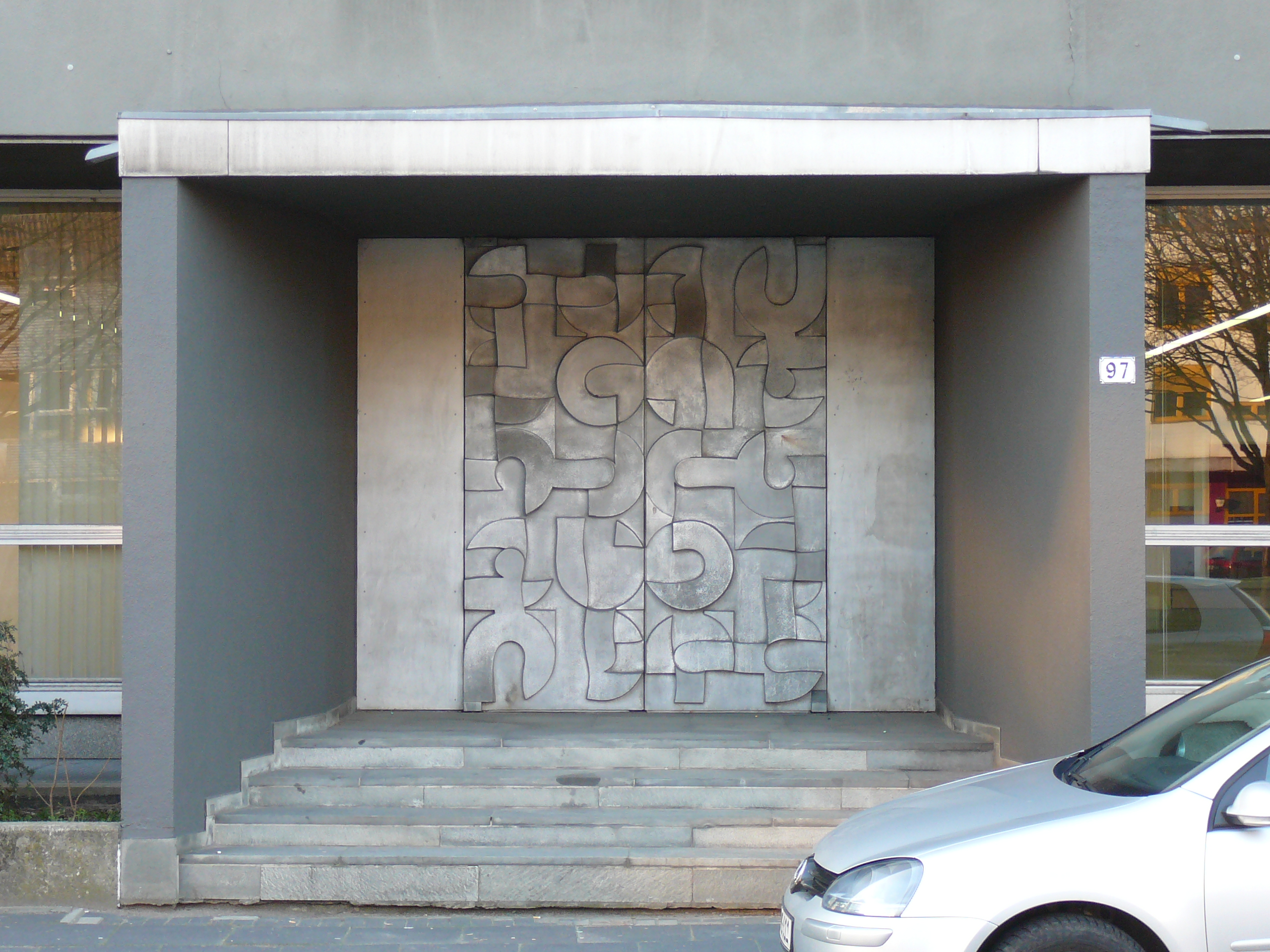
Eingangsportal am Fachbereich Architektur

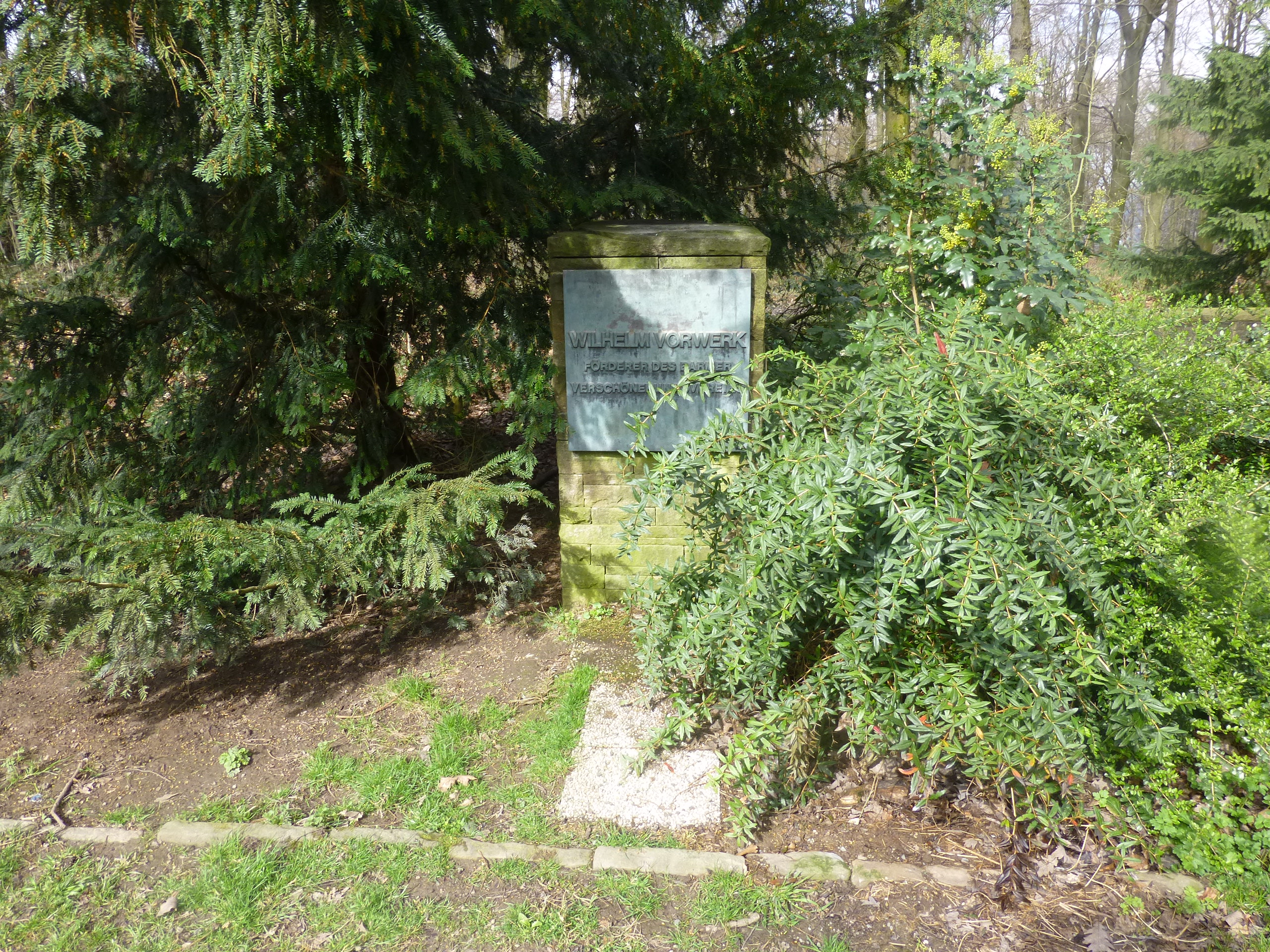
Wilhelm-Vorwerk-Gedenktafel

== Exhibition ==
- 2010: Exhibition of works in the studio of the Bergische Kunstgenossenschaft (in Kolkmannhaus) on the occasion of his 80th birthday and 50 years of membership in the BKG (solo exhibition).
