= Hadumod Bußmann =

German linguist

Hadumod Bußmann (born 5 June 1933 in Frankfurt am Main) is a German linguist.

== Life ==
After graduating from Schillerschule in Frankfurt in 1953, Hadumod Bußmann was an assistant editor in the theater department of Fischer-Verlag from 1954 to 1961. She studied German Studies, Romance Studies and Art History at Goethe University Frankfurt and LMU Munich. During her studies, Bußmann spent extended periods at the University of London and the University of Paris. From 1963, she was a research associate at the Institute for German Philology at LMU Munich. In 1967, Hadumod Bußmann received her doctorate in medieval studies with a dissertation on Eilhart von Oberg's Tristrant. She taught Germanic Linguistics at LMU Munich from 1971 to 1997, where she was also Women's Representative and spokesperson for the State Conference of University Women's Representatives in Bavaria from 1990.

Since her retirement, Hadumod Bußmann has worked as a freelance author and publicist in the fields of History of Science by Women and Gender Difference and Language. She is also a curator of the Princess Therese von Bayern Foundation, a program to promote women in science.

Bußmann lives in Munich-Schwabing.

== Honors ==
- 2005: Preis der Peregrinus-Stiftung

== Writings ==
- Lexikon der Sprachwissenschaft. 1. Auflage. Kröner, Stuttgart 1983, ISBN 3-520-45201-4. – Seither zahlreiche weitere Auflagen.
- with Renate Hof (Hrsg.): Genus. Zur Geschlechterdifferenz in den Kulturwissenschaften. Kröner, Stuttgart 1995, ISBN 3-520-49201-6.
- with Hiltrud Häntzschel (Hrsg.): Bedrohlich gescheit. Ein Jahrhundert Frauen und Wissenschaft in Bayern. Beck, Stuttgart 1997, ISBN 3-406-41857-0.
- Marlis Hellinger, Hadumod Bußmann: Gender Across Languages: The Linguistic Representation of Women and Men. 3 Bände. Benjamins, Amsterdam, Philadelphia 2001 (englisch).
- with Renate Hof (Hrsg.): Genus. Geschlechterforschung. Gender Studies in den Kultur- und Sozialwissenschaften. Ein Handbuch. Kröner, Stuttgart 2005, ISBN 3-520-82201-6.
- Ich habe mich vor nichts im Leben gefürchtet. Die ungewöhnliche Geschichte der Prinzessin Therese von Bayern. C.H. Beck, München 2011, ISBN 978-3-406-61353-1.
- Die Prinzessin und ihr »Kavalier«. Therese von Bayern und Maximilian Freiherr von Speidel auf Brasilien-Expedition im Jahr 1888. Allitera Verlag, München 2013, ISBN 978-3-86906-185-6.
- Prinzessin Dr. h. c. Therese von Bayern. Ihr Leben zwischen München und Bodensee – zwischen Standespflichten und Selbstbestimmung. Allitera Verlag, München 2015, ISBN 978-3-86906-747-6.
