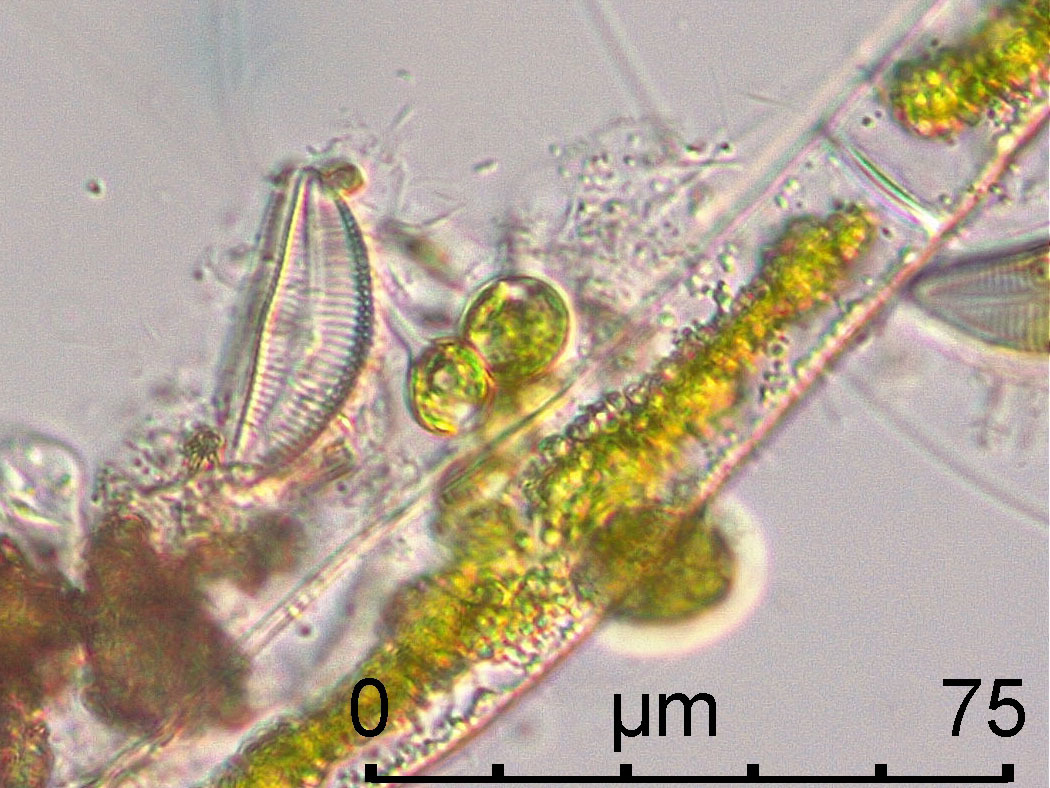
- Chaetosphaeridium globosum

Scientific classification
- Clade: Viridiplantae
- (unranked): Charophyta
- Class: Coleochaetophyceae
- Order: Chaetosphaeridiales; Marin & Melkonian
- Family: Chaetosphaeridiaceae

Genera
- Dicoleon Klebahn 1893; Polychaetophora West & West 1903; Chaetosphaeridium Klebahn 1892

= Chaetosphaeridiales =

Order of algae

Chaetosphaeridiales is an order of green algae.
