= Filament (band) =

Filament is a musical group from Japan that consists of Otomo Yoshihide and Sachiko M, two of the major exponents of the electroacoustic improvisation style of music.

The two played as a duo for the first time on November 5, 1995 in London, but it was not until 1997 that they began to play often together and Filament became one of their main projects. At first their work together was branded as A-102, then they used both Filament and A-102, and occasionally simply "duo," with no specific project name. Since their United States and France concert tour of May 1998, they have used the name Filament exclusively.

== Discography ==
- 29092000 (2001)
- Filament 2: Secret Recordings (1999) (With Günter Müller)
- Filament 1 (1998)
