= Tetuzi Akiyama =

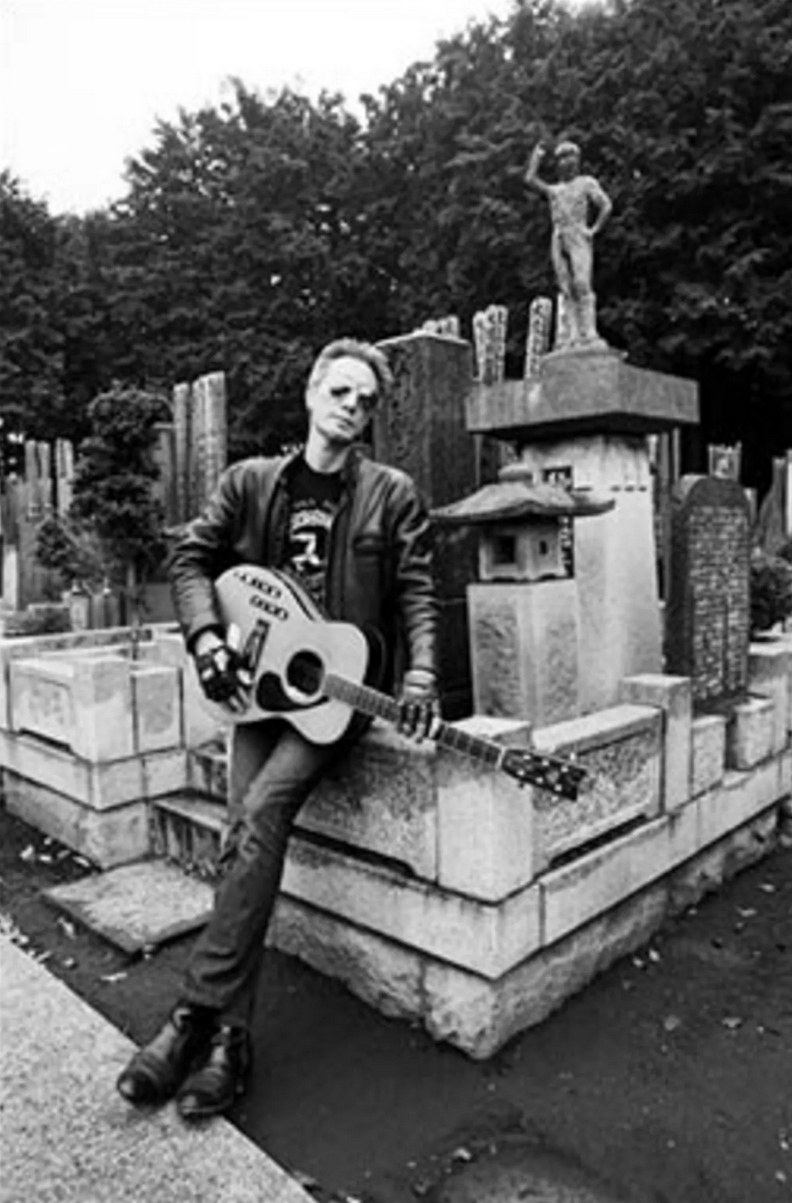
- Tetuzi Akiyama at Gotoku-ji in 2003

Background information
- Genres: Free jazz, free improvisation, onkyokei, rock and roll
- Occupation: Musician
- Instrument(s): guitar, violin, turn table
- Website: japanimprov.com/takiyama/

Tetuzi Akiyama (Akiyama Tetsuji) (born 1964) is a Japanese guitarist, violinist, and instrument-maker.

Akiyama formed the improvisation group Madhar in 1987, and the classical ensemble Hikyo String Quintet in 1994 (which also included Taku Sugimoto on cello). In 1995, Akiyama and Sugimoto formed a guitar duo, and played at venues in New York City, Chicago, and Detroit. During this time, Akiyama was also a member of Keiji Haino's Nijiumu outfit. Akiyama also formed Sutekina Tea Time (a duo with Takashi Matsuoka) and Mongoose (a trio with Taku Sugimoto and Utah Kawasaki).

In 1998 Akiyama began organising a monthly concert series, The Improvisation Meeting, with Toshimaru Nakamura. In December 2006 he began a regular duo with Hervé Boghossian (France), they toured in Europe (France, Portugal, Switzerland, England) several times in 2007 (in May, October and December) and also played in Tokyo during Hervé Boghossian Japanese tour in August/September 2008. In 2009 he worked with David Sylvian.

== Discography ==
=== Solo ===
- Relator (Slub Music, 2001)
- Resophonie (A Bruit Secret, 2002)
- Enha 4 (with Yoko Naito) (Enha, 2003)
- Don't Forget to Boogie (Idea, 2003)
- Playback 08 (Commune-Disc, 2004)
- Playback 09 (Commune-Disc, 2004)
- Route 13 the Gates of Hell: Live in Tokyo (Headz, 2005)
- Pre-Existence (Locust, 2005)
- Terrifying Street Trees (Esquilo, Portugal, 2006)
- Striking Another Match (Utech, 2006)
- The Ancient Balance to Control Death (Western Vinyl, 2008)

=== Duets ===
- International Domestic (Corpus Hermeticum, 2003)
- Tetuzi Akiyama / Richard Francis (with Richard Francis) 7" (CMR, 2003)
- Proletarian Drift (with Jozef van Wissem) (BVHaast, 2004)
- Playback 087 (with Paul Hood) (Commune-Disc, 2004)
- Oimacta (with Martin Ng) (Improvised Music From Japan, 2004)
- Points And Slashes (with Günter Müller) (Erstwhile, 2005)
- Till We Meet Again (with Jason Kahn) (For 4 Ears, 2005)
- Vinegar and Rum (with Donald McPherson) (Bo'Weavil, 2006)
- Hymn For A Fallen Angel (with Jozef van Wissem) (Incunabulum, 2007)
- Semi-Impressionism (with Toshimaru Nakamura) (Spekk, 2009)
- 13 & 14 for Guitars (with Taku Sugimoto) (slubmusic tengu, 2009)

=== Trios ===
- At Penguin House (with Mongoose) (Slub Music, 1999)
- Hokou (with Taku Sugimoto and Bo Wiget) (Corpus Hermeticum, 2001)
- Luwa (with Utah Kawasaki and Jason Kahn) (Rossbin, 2001)
- Bject (with Utah Kawasaki and Masahiko Okura) (Hibari Music, 2002)
- Futuro (with Tim Barnes and Masafumi Ezaki (Quakebasket, 2004)
- Object 4 (Locust, 2004)
- Ailack (with Jason Kahn and Utah Kawasaki) (Creative Sources, 2005)
- Willow Weep And Moan For Me (with Oren Ambarchi and Alan Licht) (Antiopic, 2006)

=== Quartets ===
- Akiyama/Taxt/Lønning/Reinertsen: Varianter av døde trær (SOFA, 2008)
- Nero's Expedition (with Johan Arrias, Leo Svensson and Henrik Olsson) (mono, 2009)
- Novaya Zemlya (with Philip Dadson, John Bell and Andrew McMillan) (iiii, 2011)

=== Quintets ===
- Koboku Senjû: Selektiv hogst (SOFA, 2010)

=== Compilations ===
- Spectra: Guitar in the 21st Century (Quiet Design, 2009)

== Listening ==
- Search results of "tetuzi akiyama"at bandcamp
