= Nicholas Bussmann =

German composer

Nicholas Bussmann is a composer and performer.

He founded the Love Song Competition, which takes place every year in Berlin. Nicholas Bussmann has collaborated with Toshimaru Nakamura (Alles 3) and Martin Brandlmayr (Kapital band 1) amongst others.
