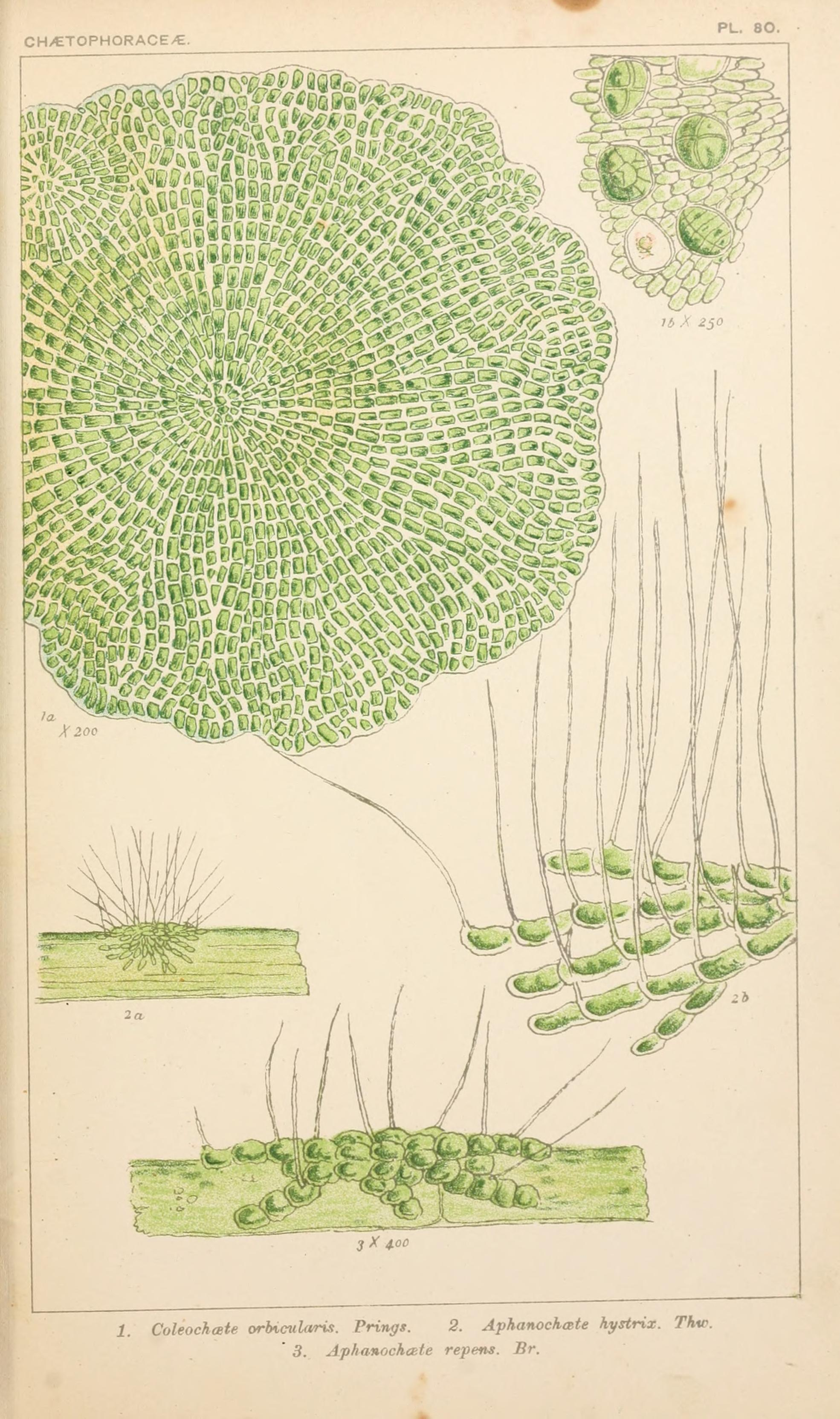
- Coleochaete sp.

Scientific classification
- Domain: Eukaryota
- Clade: Archaeplastida
- Clade: Viridiplantae
- Division: Charophyta
- Class: Coleochaetophyceae
- Order: Coleochaetales; Chadefaud
- Family: Coleochaetaceae; Nägeli

Genera
- Awadhiella B.N.Prasad & D.K.Asthana; Coleochaete Brébisson, nom. cons.; Conochaete Klebahn; Phyllactidium Kützing; Radioramus H.J.Hu & Y.X.Wei

= Coleochaetaceae =

Order of algae

Coleochaetaceae is a family of algae. It is the only family in the Coleochaetales, an order of parenchymous charophyte algae, within the class Coleochaetophyceae. It includes some of the closest multicellular relatives of land plants. It contains the genus Coleochaete and questionably includes the fossil genus Parka.
