= Onkyokei =

Music genre

- Stylistic origins: Japanoise; free improvisation; electronic; lowercase; EAI
- Cultural origins: Late 1990s Japan

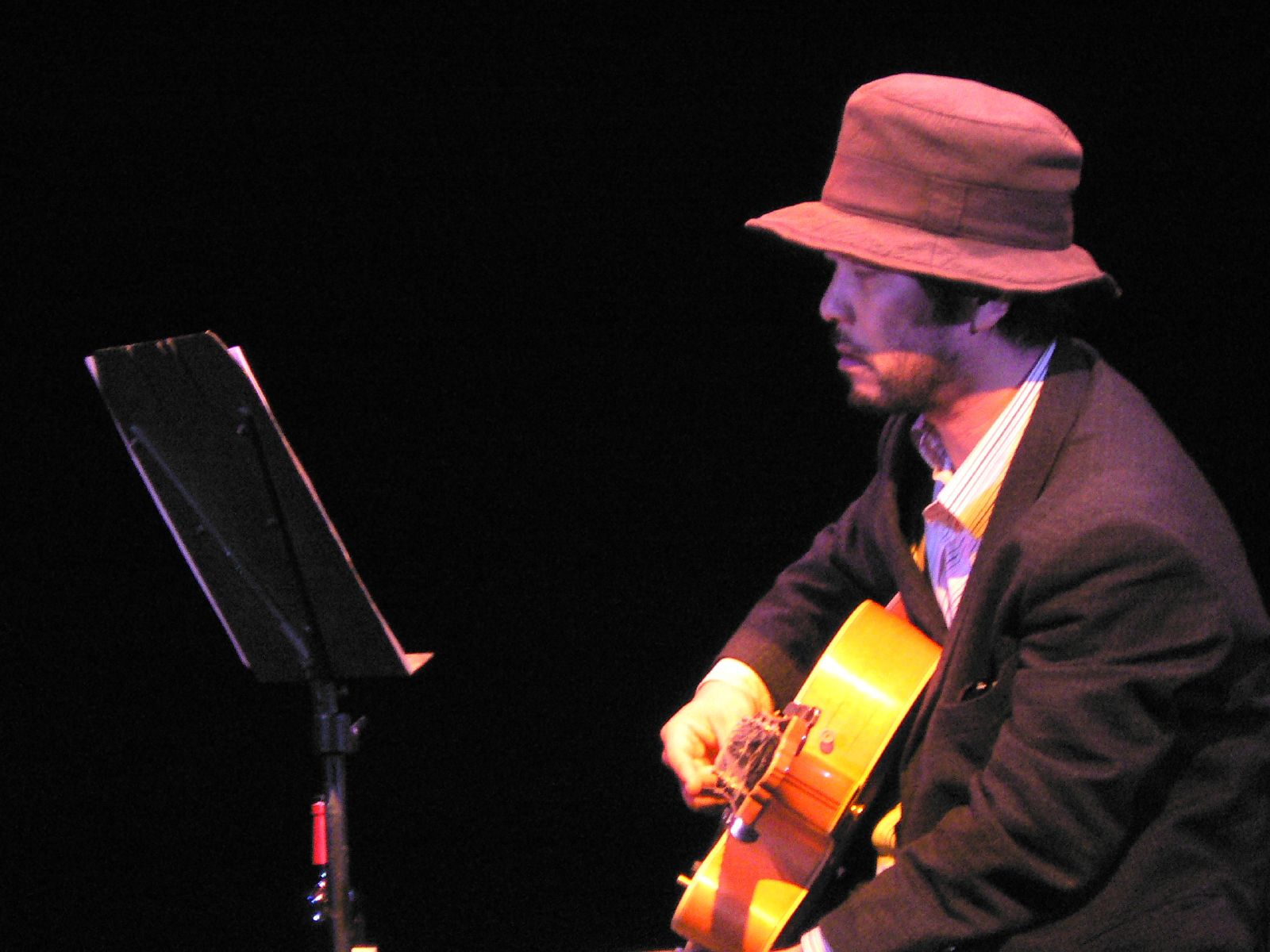
Taku Sugimoto, whose music is commonly associated with Onkyo

The Onkyo music movement or Onkyokei (音響系, Onkyōkei) (translation: "reverberation of sound") is a form of free improvisation, emerging from Japan in the late 1990s. Onkyō can be translated as "sound, noise, echo". Some artists commonly associated with Onkyō include Toshimaru Nakamura, Tetuzi Akiyama, Sachiko M, and Taku Sugimoto, among others.

The Off Site, a venue in Tokyo, is home to the Onkyo music movement, which is characterized by improvisation, minimalism, and "quiet noise". Onkyo improvisation "explores the fine-grained textural details of acoustic and electronic sound".

It influenced the development of electroacoustic improvisation, or EAI, a genre with which it is strongly intertwined. The transnational circulation of onkyo also influenced its representation as a form of "Japanese new music," despite claims by its authors that onkyo had little to do with Japanese cultural identity.

== See also ==
- Japanoise
- John Cage
