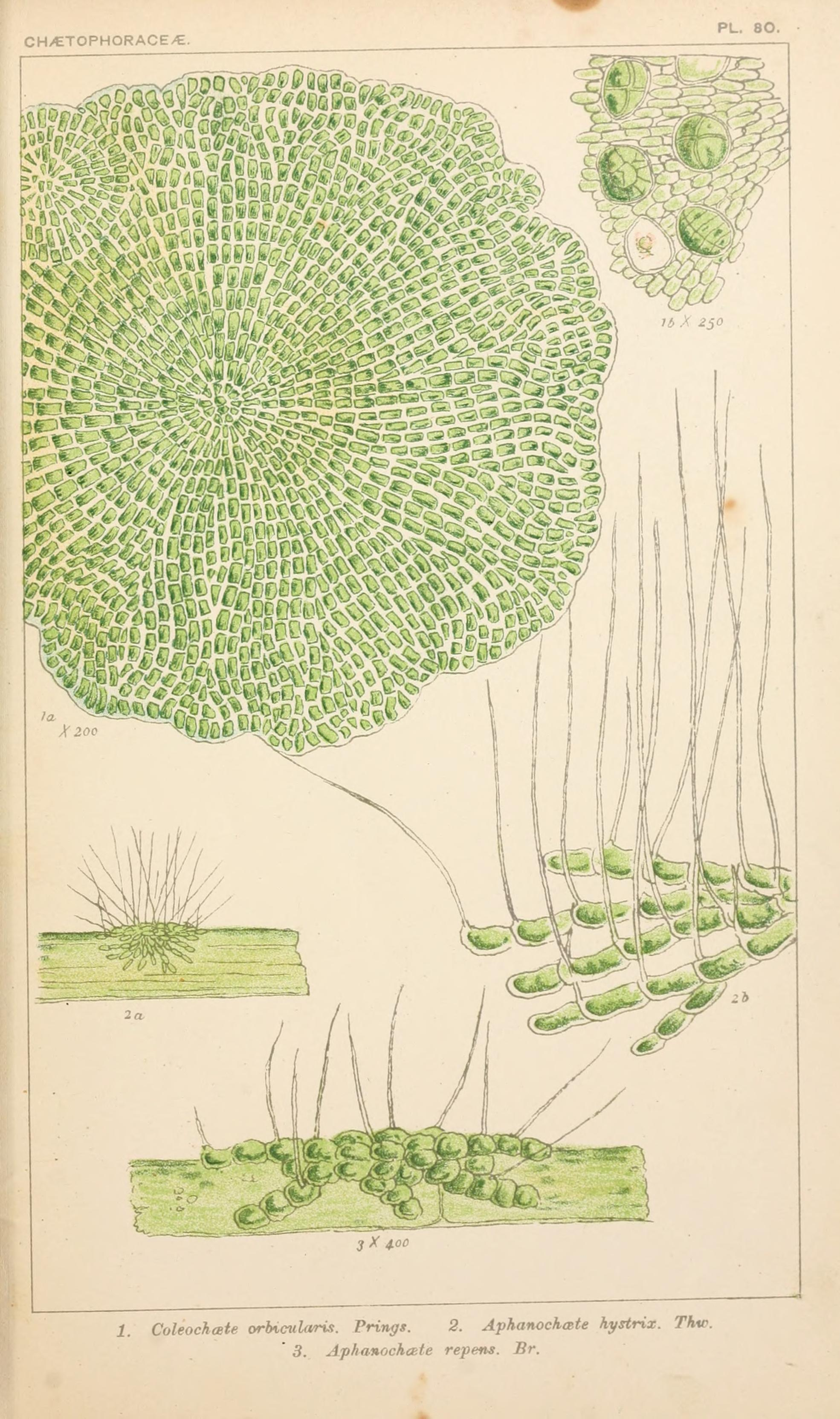
- Coleochaete sp.

Scientific classification
- Domain: Eukaryota
- Clade: Archaeplastida
- Clade: Viridiplantae
- Clade: Phragmoplastophyta
- Class: Coleochaetophyceae; C.Jeffrey

Orders
- Chaetosphaeridiales; Coleochaetales

= Coleochaetophyceae =

Class of algae

Coleochaetophyceae is a class of charophyte algae related to land plants (only Zygnematophyceae is closer), and is estimate to be 606.1 ± 119.4 million years old. There are about 35 known species, and are predominantly found in freshwater where they live periphytic on the surface of aquatic plants, plastic bags and pebbles in the shallow littoral zone of freshwater lakes. These are small disc-shaped or filamentous species – the filaments can be spread radially or be irregularly branched – but can reach several millimeters in diameter, and have true multicellular organisation with sexual and asexual reproduction. The discs never develop beyond a two-dimensional organization. Their mitogenome is the most intron-rich organelle among the streptophyte algae. The sperm cells are flagellated, but the egg has no flagella, and the following zygote possesses algaenan, which resembles sporopollenin.

The group contain two orders, Coleochaetales and Chaetosphaeridiales.
