= Martin Tétreault =

Canadian DJ and visual artist

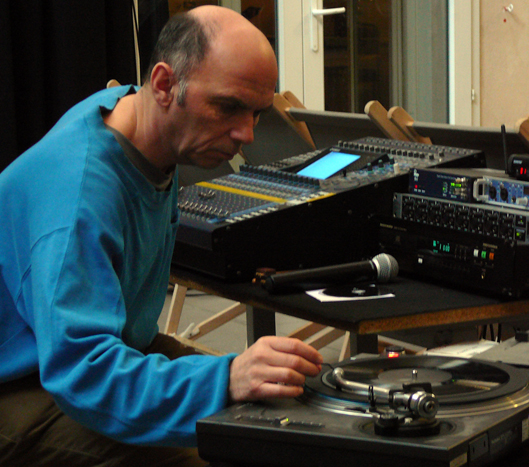
- image of Martin Tétreault in the studio, was a Canadian DJ and visual artist

Background information
- Born: 1957 (age 67–68); Saint-Jean-Baptiste, Quebec, Canada
- Genres: Free improvisation
- Occupations: Musician, visual artist
- Instrument: Turntable

Martin Tétreault (born 1957 in Saint-Jean-Baptiste, Quebec, Canada) is a free improvisation musician and visual artist. He often employs the turntable as the basis for his experimental music, he has over 60 releases, featuring him solo or in collaborations with artists like Kevin Drumm and Otomo Yoshihide.
