= Taku Sugimoto =

Japanese guitarist

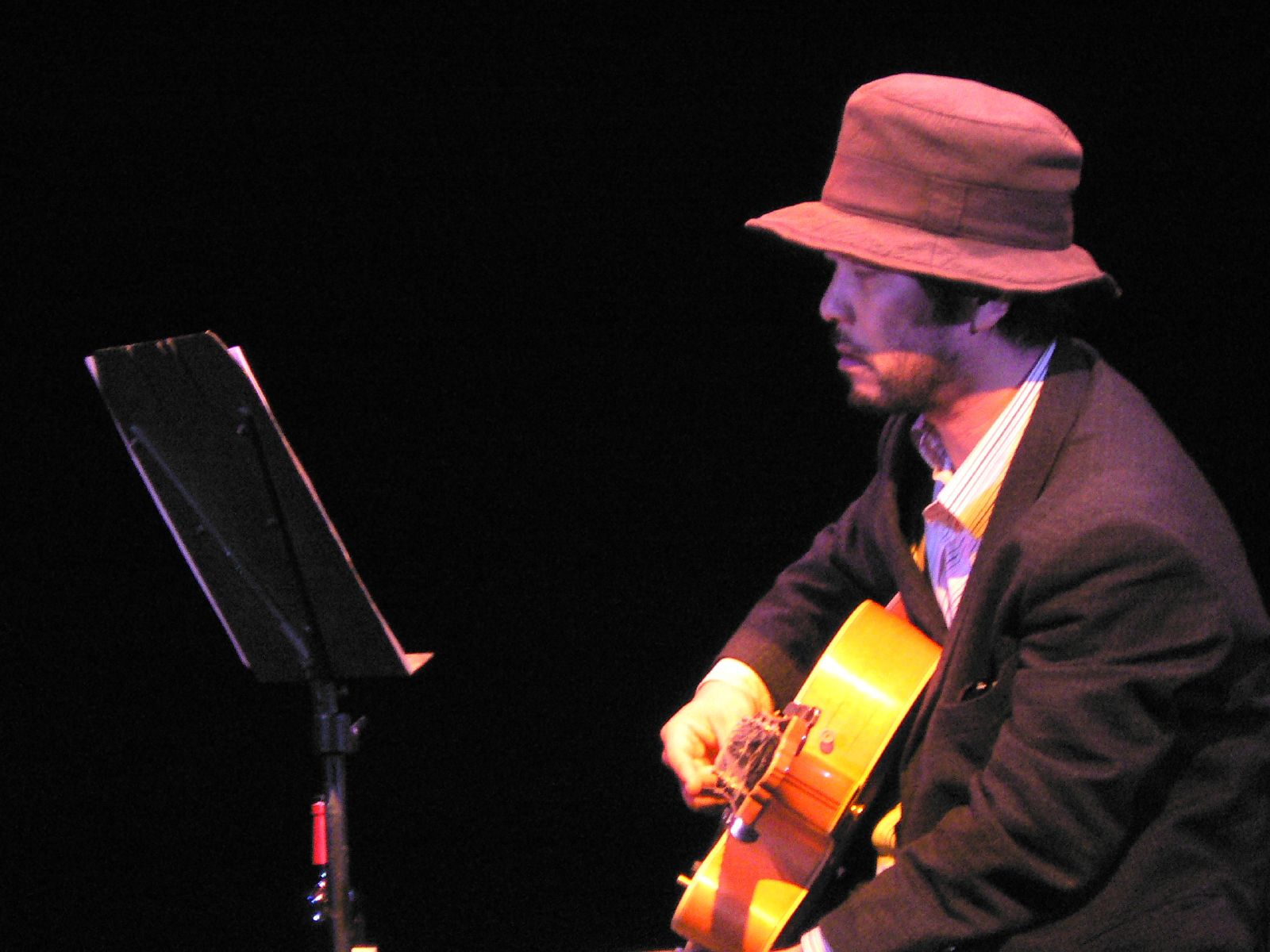
Sugimoto in a performance

Taku Sugimoto, born 20 December 1965, in Tokyo, is a Japanese guitarist.

He initially gained attention in the late 1990s for his restrained, melodic playing, unusual in the world of free improvisation. Critic Bruce Russell describes this era of Sugimoto's music by writing: "Sugimoto is perhaps the pre-eminent stylist on the guitar ... He brings a golden glow to every session he partakes in, having abandoned amped up noise in favour of a much more introspective and calligraphic style of play."

Around 2002 his music became increasingly abstract, all but eliminating melody and featuring extended periods of silence.

He has collaborated with other Japanese musicians involved in the Onkyo movement, such as Sachiko M, Toshimaru Nakamura and Otomo Yoshihide. He has also collaborated with musicians from European free improvisation scenes, notably trombonist Radu Malfatti and guitarist Keith Rowe.
