= Toshimaru Nakamura =

Japanese musician

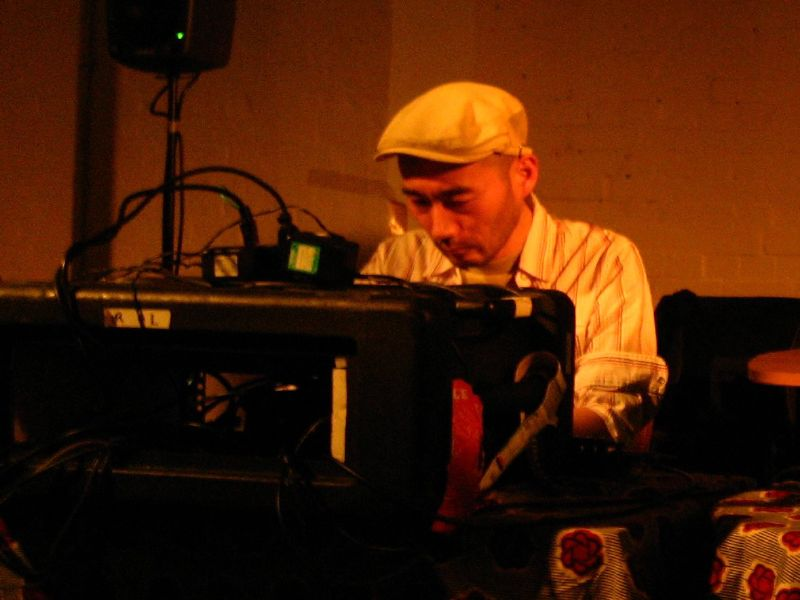
- Nakamura at Cafe Oto, London, May 2008

Background information
- Genres: Free jazz, free improvisation, onkyokei, rock and roll
- Occupation: Musician
- Instruments: Mixing console, guitar
- Website: japanimprov.com/tnakamura/

Toshimaru Nakamura is a Japanese musician, active in free improvisation and onkyokei.

He began his career playing rock and roll guitar, but gradually explored other types of music, even abandoning guitar, and started working on circuit bending. He uses a mixing console as a live, interactive musical instrument: "Nakamura plays the 'no-input mixing board', connecting the input of the board to the output, then manipulating the resultant audio feedback."

Nakamura's music has been described as "sounds ranging from piercing high tones and shimmering whistles to galumphing, crackle-spattered bass patterns."

Nakamura founded the ensemble A Paragon of Beauty in 1992. He has recorded solo albums, worked as a session musician, and collaborated with artists including Sachiko M ("a kindred spirit"), Otomo Yoshihide, Keith Rowe, John Butcher, Espen Reinertsen, Nicholas Bussmann, Taku Sugimoto, Tetuzi Akiyama, dancer Kim Ito, and drummer Jason Kahn.
