= Sachiko M =

Japanese musician (born 1973)

Sachiko Matsubara (Japanese: 松原 幸子; born 1973), better known by her stage name Sachiko M, is a Japanese musician. Her first solo album, Sine Wave Solo, was released in 1999. Working in collaboration with Ami Yoshida under the name Cosmos in 2002, Sachiko released the two disc album Astro Twin/Cosmos (2) which was awarded the Golden Nica prize in Ars Electronica, 2003. She released Good Morning Good Night, a collaborative album with Otomo Yoshihide and Toshimaru Nakamura, in 2004.

== Selected discography ==
- Filament 1 (1998) with Otomo Yoshihide
- Un (1998) with Toshimaru Nakamura
- Four Focuses (1999) with Martin Tétreault, Yasuhiro Otani, and Otomo Yoshihide
- Filament 2 (Secret Recordings 2) (1999) with Günter Müller and Otomo Yoshihide
- Sine Wave Solo (1999)
- Do (2001) with Toshimaru Nakamura
- Tears with Ami Yoshida as Cosmos (2002)
- Les Hautes Solitudes - A Philippe Garrel Film: Imaginary Soundtrack (2002) with Otomo Yoshihide and Taku Sugimoto
- Artefact (2002) with Philip Samartzis
- Good Morning Good Night (2004) with Otomo Yoshihide and Toshimaru Nakamura
- Manafon (2009) with David Sylvian

== Bibliography ==
- Where We Are (Bccks, 2012)
- Sachiko M Sound Installation: I'm Here: Shortstay (Bccks, 2013)
- All About Sachiko M: Intro (Bccks, 2013)
