= DAT Politics =

French electronic band

- Origin: France
- Genres: Electropop, Dance
- Years active: 1999–present
- Labels: Chicks On Speed Records, Tigerbeat6, Sub Rosa, Shitkatapult, Disc Drive
- Members: Claude Pailliot, Gaëtan Collet
- Website: www.datpolitics.com

DAT politics is a French electronic band created in 1999. Their energetic live shows explain the cult like enthusiasm that surrounds the French electronic combo as they have been touring the world extensively over the years. The two founder members (also known as Tone Rec, Mazza Vision and Skipp) are also involved in visuals and graphic design which leads them to create their own record covers and videos. The music of the duo is often classified under the electropop genre and described as catchy, melodic and sometimes experimental.

They collaborated and played with electronic experimental acts such as Matmos, Mouse On Mars, Dan Deacon, Black Dice, Aphex Twin, Squarepusher, Pan Sonic, Felix Kubin, Kid 606, and Robert Lippok.

They played at numerous techno parties and festivals all over the world such as Warp Electrowerk in England, Sonar Night, Baltimore in US, Dour Festival in Belgium and the Donau Festival in Austria. DAT Politics have appeared on multiple experimental or dance compilations, such as Clicks & Cuts alongside Alva Noto, Pan Sonic, Thomas Brinkmann; plus iTunes Essentials alongside French Touch 2.0 artists including Mr Oizo, Daft Punk and Kavinsky. They remixed a bunch of international electronic producers.

Originally a laptop quintet, the band works as a duo since 2009. To date, they have released ten studio albums on numerous international labels. Their latest album, Substage was released in 2023 on the American record label, Disc Drive.

== Discography ==
=== Studio albums ===
- (1999) Tracto Flirt - Tigerbeat6
- (2000) Villiger - A-musik
- (2001) Sous Hit - Tigerbeat6
- (2002) Plugs Plus - COS Rec
- (2004) Go Pets Go - COS Rec
- (2006) Wow Twist - COS Rec
- (2009) Mad Kit - COS Rec
- (2012) Blitz Gazer - Sub Rosa
- (2013) Powermoon - Tigerbeat6
- (2015) No Void - Shitkatapult
- (2023) Substage - Disc Drive

=== EPs and singles ===
- (1999) Process / DAT Politics - Split Series #9 - Fat Cat Records
- (2000) Pâta Jet - Bottrop Boy
- (2001) Rag Bag - Fällt/Fodder
- (2006) Alphabet Series P - Tomlab
- (2006) Roll - Ljud Records
- (2007) Are Oui Phony? - Tigerbeat6
- (2011) People R Inside - IDD
- (2018) Cheval Rouge - Hypnic Jerk
- (2019) DAT Politics / Felix Kubin Split Single - Hypnic Jerk
- (2023) Optic Games - Disc Drive
