= Gert-Jan Prins =

Dutch musician

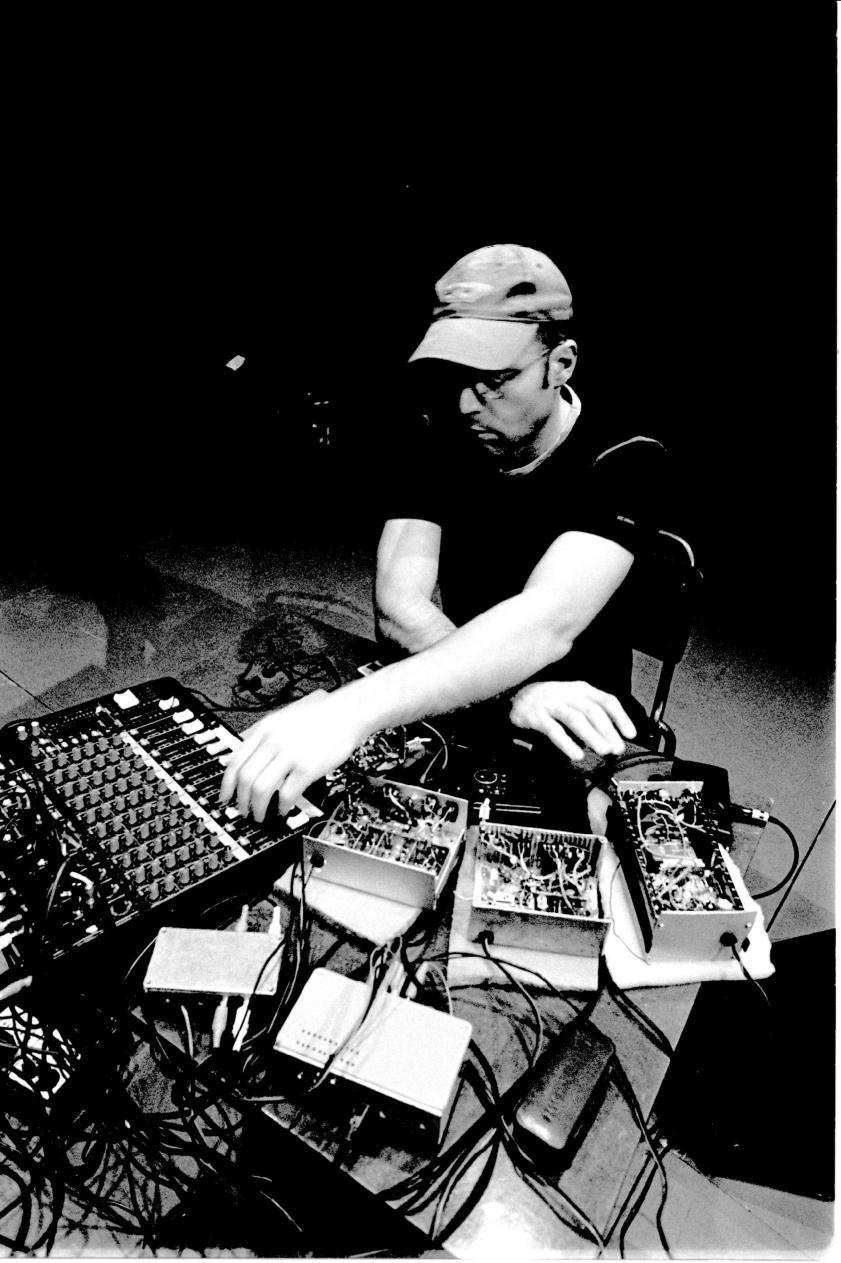
Gert-Jan Prins

Gert-Jan Prins (born 1961, IJmuiden) is a Dutch musician active in free improvisation.

Initially a free jazz percussionist, Prins now focuses on producing and manipulating sound, especially white and pink noise, using a collection of custom-built FM radio transmitters and receivers, similar to the instruments of American composer David Tudor.

Prins is a member of M.I.M.E.O., a twelve-piece electronic orchestra led by Keith Rowe (formerly of the British free-improvisation trio AMM). He has groups with synthesizer players Thomas Lehn and Thomas Ankersmit, pianist Cor Fuhler and composer and reed player Peter van Bergen.

== Discography ==
- 2012 Gert-Jan Prins – S/T 10"EP (The Spring Press #14)
- 2011 mimeo wigry, 2lp, monolp006
- 2010 Tomas Korber / gert-jan prins: RI 1.5442, cd, cavity 03
- 2010 gert-jan prins cavity: the capacitive version, publication+ 10" vinyl, onomatopee 39
- 2009 gert-jan prins & bas van koolwijk: synchronator device, first edition
- 2009 gert-jan prins & bas van koolwijk: synchronator, DVD, cavity 02
- 2008 gert-jan prins cavity, cd, cavity 01
- 2008 gert-jan prins break before make, cd, demego 002
- 2007 mimeo sight, cd, cathnor004
- 2005 mimeo lifting concrete lightly live at the serpentine gallery pavilion 2003, 3-cd
- 2004 the vacuum boys space breakdance challenge, cd takashi mobile 01
- 2004 e-rax (van bergen lehn prins dolleman) antics, DVD, infim
- 2004 gert-jan prins risk mego 072 mini-cd
- 2003 the flirts, various artists kraakgeluiden document 1 cd unsounds
- 2003 sciajno / prins the d&b album featuring: do shine'o & prinsjan cd bowindo
- 2002 the vacuum boys play songs from the sea of love cd fire inc
- 2002 gj prins rg 58 gj lp creamgarden
- 2002 mimeo / John Tilbury the hands of caravaggio cd Erstwhile Records
- 2002 van bergen / prins / fennesz dawn cd grob
- 2001 Cor Fuhler / prins the flirts cd erstwhile
- 2000 gert-jan prins prinslive cd grob
- 2000 various artists international live electronic music incorporated cd x-or
- 2000 mimeo electric chair + table 2-cd grob
- 2000 e-rax van bergen lehn prins live at the bimhuis 99 cd x-or
- 1999 gert-jan prins sub 8 & 9 maxi single a-musik sieben
- 1999 mimeo music in movement electronic orchestra cd perditionplastics
- 1999 l'oops werner puntigam / gj prins, live @ café strom, linz cd ixthuluh
- 1999 Anne La Berge / gj prins united noise toys live in utrecht '98 cd x-or
- 1998 mimeo music in movement electronic orchestra queue cd grob
- 1998 various artists the cocktail event cd staalplaat
- 1998 Luc Houtkamp the duo recordings various artists cd x-or
- 1998 gert-jan prins noise capture cd x-or
- 1997 houtkamp / van hove / prins live in Canada cd x-or
- 1997 mengelberg / Mats Gustafsson / prins live in holland cd x-or
- 1997 various artists x-or on tour! cd x-or
- 1996 Micha Mengelberg / houtkamp / prins various artists cd x-or
- 1994 analecta body o' graphic cd x-or
- 1994 houtkamp / beukman / prins / bauer metslawier cd x-or
- 1993 analecta what you hear is where you are cd x-or
- 1988 gorgonzola legs piscatorial debris cd exart
