= Luiz DePalma =

Luiz DePalma - Sebastian
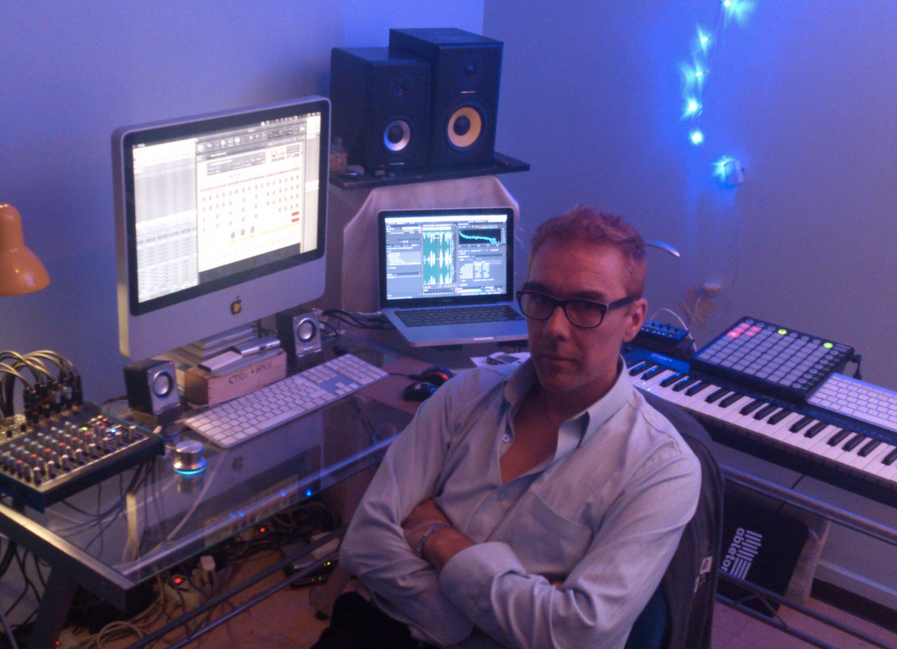
- Luiz DePalma in Bogotá 2012

Background information
- Also known as: Luiz DePalma, Dave Vaporwave, Artwerk, Orcio Minorenne, Move Inc., Tapeslave, Proxy Page
- Born: 24 March 1969 (age 56); Amsterdam, Netherlands
- Genres: Electronica, techno, house, jazz
- Occupation(s): Composer, Music producer, Remixer, Audio Engineer, Mastering Engineer
- Years active: 1985-2022
- Labels: Audiomotion Recordings, Aspro, Outland Records, EVA, Transworld, Gyrate, Zeroaudio

Luiz DePalma - Sebastian (born 24 March 1969) is the moniker of Sebastian Just Sebastian Dutch composer, producer, He is also the founder of Move Inc. A Dutch underground record label from 1992 to 1996, on which he produced the 1994 club classic "Partners" off the Vive la Trance EP. Move Inc. was rebooted as Audiomotion Recordings in 2010, on which he releases all his current work as Sebastian Just Sebastian, Luiz DePalma, Artwerk, Orcio Minorenne and Tapeslave.

== Education ==
Sebastian - Luiz DePalma started playing violin in 1977 at the age of eight with Ig Henneman. Drums in 1979 at the Sweelinck Conservatorium with Ton Rooyers in Amsterdam. Continued his study at the Koninklijk Conservatorium in Leeuwarden (NL) from 1991 and so, got involved in electronic music production and recording. Played in numerous Dutch bands as keyboardplayer, bassplayer and drummer. In 1991 teamed up with Dutch DJ’s and house & disco pioneers Saul Poolman and Eddie de Clerq.

== Present ==
In 2011, Luiz DePalma moved to Bogotá where he opened his studio Vila Maya One and started Audiomotion Recordings. He released the entire back catalog of unreleased productions from between 2002 – 2009. Including the remastered back catalog works by Move Inc. dating from 1992. Sebastian Just Sebastian is known for his recognizable sound as for his considerable output of works. In 2015, Sebastian moved back to Amsterdam and continues to run the labels Audiomotion Recordings and Zeroaudio. Sebastian produces under the aka's: Luiz DePalma Tapeslave, Artwerk, Dusty Skateboard, Proxy Page and Orcio Minorenne (which is an anagram for Ennio Morricone).

== Discography ==
| Title | Year | Release type | Label | Catalog |
|---|---|---|---|---|
| Just In Time Band - Just in time | 1990 | CD | unknown | JMREC001 |
| Unknown artist - Deja Vu Tracks | 1993 | Vinyl | Looneyville Records | LVG0101 |
| Pius I - Reports From The Vatican | 1994 | Vinyl | Looneyville Records | VIL 0802 |
| Move Inc. - Vive La Trance | 1994 | Vinyl | Move Inc. / AMR | MIA001 |
| Move Inc. - Mystery Machine | 1994 | Vinyl | Move Inc. / AMR | MIA002 |
| Move Inc. - Partners (Transworld remixes) | 1994 | Vinyl double | Transworld | tranny 6T |
| Static Tracks 6 | 1994 | CD | Outland Records | STATICCD006 |
| Move The House 11 | 1994 | CD double | EVA | EVA8294252 |
| Move Inc. - Whiplash | 1997 | Vinyl | ASPRO | ASPRO 013 |
| Artwerk - Reasons vol. 1 | 2001 | CD | Unknown | AW001 |
| Luiz DePalma - More Of The Same | 2007 | CD | Unknown | AW002 |
| Luiz DePalma - Tailgate | 2010 | CD single | Audiomotion Recordings | AMLDP001 |
| Luiz DePalma - Mono Poly | 2011 | Digital single | Audiomotion Recordings | LDPEP01 |
| Luiz DePalma - Love Comes | 2011 | Digital single | Audiomotion Recordings | AMLDPTC02 |
| Luiz DePalma - Catsz | 2011 | Digital single | Audiomotion Recordings | AMLDPTC03 |
| Luiz DePalma - The Dancer EP | 2011 | Digital EP | Audiomotion Recordings | AMEPLDP002 |
| Luiz DePalma - Your Recipe | 2011 | Digital single | Audiomotion Recordings | AMLDPTC03 |
| LDP - EP3 | 2011 | Digital EP | Audiomotion Recordings | AMEPLDP003 |
| LDP - EP4 | 2011 | Digital EP | Audiomotion Recordings | AMEPLDP004 |
| Luiz DePalma - 1000x A Day | 2011 | Digital single | Audiomotion | AMLDPTC04 |
| LDP - EP05 | 2011 | Digital EP | Audiomotion Recordings | LDPEP05 |
| LDP - Ldp_ep06 | 2011 | Digital EP | Audiomotion Recordings | LDPEP06 |
| Move Inc. - Remastered | 2011 | Digital | Audiomotion Recordings | AMMI001 |
| Move Inc. - Timeless | 2011 | Digital | Audiomotion Recordings | AMMI002 |
| Move Inc. - From There To Here | 2011 | Digital | Audiomotion Recordings | AMMI003 |
| Artwerk - Speaking Of Reasons | 2011 | Digital EP | Audiomotion Recordings | AMARSOR01 |
| Artwerk - Tracks From The Crib | 2011 | Digital EP | Audiomotion Recordings | AMAWTFC01 |
| Artwerk - Hot For Now | 2011 | Digital EP | Audiomotion Recordings | AMARHFN01 |
| Artwerk - White Edits | 2011 | Digital | Audiomotion Recordings | AW005WE |
| Artwerk - Calle De Florian | 2011 | Digital | Audiomotion Recordings | AWCDF |
| Artwerk - Bad Robot | 2011 | Digital | Audiomotion Recordings | AMAWBR01 |
| Artwerk - 6 | 2011 | Digital EP | Audiomotion Recordings | AMAW06 |
| Artwerk - Reasons vol. 1 remastered | 2011 | Digital album | Audiomotion Recordings | AMARR001 |
| Move Inc. - On Acid | 2011 | Digital | Audiomotion Recordings | AMMI0002 |
| Tapeslave - Tapeslave | 2011 | Digital album | Audiomotion Recordings | AMTSA001 |
| Luiz DePalma - LOAD | 2012 | Digital single | Audiomotion Recordings | AMLDPTECH01 |
| Luiz DePalma - The Bear | 2012 | Digital single | Audiomotion Recordings | AMLDPTECH02 |
| Luiz DePalma - LDPPep07 feat. Deborah Cox | 2012 | Digital | Audiomotion Recordings | AMLDPEP07 |
| Luiz DePalma - The Breeze | 2012 | Digital single | Audiomotion Recordings | AMLDPTECH03 |
| Luiz DePalma - Spirit | 2012 | Digital single | Audiomotion Recordings | AMLDPTECH04 |
| Luiz DePalma - Offcode | 2012 | Digital single | Audiomotion Recordings | AMLDPTECH05 |
| Luiz DePalma - Cool and Collected | 2012 | Digital album | Audiomotion Recordings | AMLDP201212 |
| Luiz DePalma - Scores To The Void | 2012 | Digital album | Audiomotion Recordings | AMLDP221212 |
| Luiz DePalma - LDPEP_009 | 2012 | Digital EP | Audiomotion Recordings | AMLDPEP009 |
| Move Inc. - Deep feat. Stacey Pullen | 2012 | Digital EP | Audiomotion Recordings | AMMI005 |
| Move Inc. - Back To The Beat | 2012 | Digital EP | Audiomotion Recordings | AMMI007 |
| Move Inc. - Heads Up | 2012 | Digital EP | Audiomotion Recordings | AMMI009 |
| Artwerk - RoXYlove | 2012 | Digital | Audiomotion Recordings | AMAW007 |
| Artwerk - Three Of A Kind | 2012 | Digital EP | Audiomotion Recordings | AMAW008 |
| Artwerk - Plata Del Mar | 2012 | Digital | Audiomotion Recordings | AMAW009 |
| Orcio Minorenne - Haze | 2012 | Digital single | Audiomotion Recordings | AMOM001 |
| Orcio Minorenne - Beyond | 2012 | Digital single | Audiomotion Recordings | AMOM002 |
| Tapeslave - Tapeslave 2 | 2012 | Digital album | Audiomotion Recordings | AMTS002 |
| Luiz DePalma - Gears | 2013 | Digital single | Audiomotion Recordings | AMLDPTECH06 |
| Luiz DePalma - EP 10 | 2013 | Digital EP | Audiomotion Recordings | AMLDPEP010 |
| Luiz DePalma - The Workaround | 2013 | Digital single | Audiomotion Recordings | AMLDPEP011 |
| Luiz DePalma - The Runner | 2013 | Digital single | Audiomotion Recordings | AMLDPTECH07 |
| Luiz DePalma - RAW | 2013 | Digital | Audiomotion Recordings | AMLDPEP012 |
| Luiz DePalma - Excite | 2013 | Digital single | Audiomotion Recordings | AMLDPEP013 |
| Luiz DePalma - More Of The Same remastered | 2013 | Digital album | Audiomotion Recordings | AMLDP5150 |
| Artwerk - Samba | 2013 | Digital | Audiomotion Recordings | AMAW010 |
| Artwerk - The Dark Side Of Gravity | 2013 | Digital | Audiomotion Recordings | AMAW012 |
| Orcio Minorenne - Calderone | 2013 | Digital single | Audiomotion Recordings | AMOM003 |
| Orcio Minorenne - The Outer Rim | 2013 | Digital single | Audiomotion Recordings | AMOM004 |
| Orcio Minorenne - Century | 2013 | Digital single | Audiomotion Recordings | AMOM005X |
| Move Inc. - Opus1 | 2013 | Digital | Audiomotion Recordings | AMMI010 |
| Luiz DePalma - Noamsky | 2013 | Digital album | Audiomotion Recordings | AMLDP2066 |
| Luiz DePalma - The Binary Quartet | 2013 | Digital album | Audiomotion Recordings | AMLDP0330 |
| Tapeslave - Dubtape | 2013 | Digital album | Audiomotion Recordings | AMTS003 |
| Luiz DePalma - 124. | 2014 | Digital album | Audiomotion Recordings | AMLDPEP014 |
| Move Inc. - Old Gold | 2014 | Digital album | Audiomotion Recordings | AMMI011 |
| Luiz DePalma / Orcio Minorenne - Beyond the remixes | 2014 | Digital EP | Audiomotion Recordings | AMLDPRMX01 |
| Luiz DePalma - 7WFIO feat. Nadia Ali | 2014 | Digital | Audiomotion Recordings | AMLDPEP017 |
| Luiz DePalma - Public Records | 2014 | Digital EP | Audiomotion Recordings | AMLDPEP015 |
| Artwerk - The Art Of Tech | 2014 | Digital | Audiomotion Recordings | AMAW013 |
| Artwerk - Sin City | 2014 | Digital EP | Audiomotion Recordings | AMAW014 |
| Luiz DePalma - 45MOTORCITY | 2014 | Digital EP | Audiomotion Recordings | AMLPDEP016 |
| Luiz DePalma - Galactica | 2014 | Digital album | Audiomotion Recordings | AMLDP0440 |
| Luiz DePalma - Loop revisited 2014 | 2015 | Digital | Audiomotion Recordings | AMRLOOP01 |
| Luiz DePalma - I Am Orcio | 2015 | Digital | Audiomotion Recordings | AMLPDEP021 |
| Orcio Minorenne - White Rabbit In A Black Suit | 2015 | Digital single | Audiomotion Recordings | AMOM005 |
| Artwerk - The Snares of Notre Dame | 2015 | Digital | Audiomotion Recordings | AMAW0016 |
| Artwerk - El Raton en la Marina | 2015 | Digital | Audiomotion Recordings | AMAW0100 |
| Luiz DePalma - Blake | 2015 | Digital | Audiomotion Recordings | AMLPDEP023 |
| Luiz DePalma - Le Petit Latin feat. PROXY PAGE | 2015 | Digital | Audiomotion Recordings | AMLPDEP024 |
| Artwerk - Please Loading Now Wait | 2015 | Digital | Audiomotion Recordings | AMAW0101 |
| Luiz DePalma - The Ognir Remixes | 2015 | Digital EP | Audiomotion Recordings | AMLDP025 |
| Orcio Minorenne - PRAIA | 2015 | Digital single | Audiomotion Recordings | AMLDP025 |
| Luiz DePalma - The Secret Life of Synths | 2016 | Digital album | Audiomotion Recordings | AMLDP201512 |
| Luiz DePalma - The Secret Life of Synths Too | 2016 | Digital album | Audiomotion Recordings | AMLDP201500 |
| Luiz DePalma - Cool and Collected vol. 2 | 2016 | Digital album | Audiomotion Recordings | AMLDP201511 |
| Artwerk - Artifact | 2016 | Digital album | Audiomotion Recordings | AMAW0102 |
| PROXY PAGE - Let's Do It | 2016 | Digital single | Audiomotion Recordings | AMPP0001 |
| PROXY PAGE - Dream | 2016 | Digital album | Audiomotion Recordings | AMPP0002 |
| PROXY PAGE - Clusters | 2016 | Digital album | Audiomotion Recordings | AMPP0003 |
| Luiz DePalma - JACK | 2016 | Digital album | Audiomotion Recordings | AMLDP50 |
| Proxy Page - Astoria | 2017 | Digital Single | Audiomotion Recordings | AMPP04 |
| Artwerk - Saudade | 2017 | Digital Single | Audiomotion Recordings | AMAW0103 |
| Orcio Minorenne - Destination | 2017 | Digital Single | Audiomotion Recordings | AMOM007 |
| Luiz DePalma - Piano Run | 2017 | Digital Single | Audiomotion Recordings | AMLDPTECH08 |
| Luiz DePalma - EP11 | 2017 | EP (digital) | Audiomotion Recordings | AMLDPEP112017 |
| Proxy Page - Astoria | 2017 | Album | Audiomotion Recordings | AMPP05 |
| Luiz DePalma & The Binary Quartet - Short Haul | 2017 | Album | Audiomotion Recordings | AMTBQ02 |
| Luiz DePalma - Lost On Earth | 2018 | Digital double album | Audiomotion Recordings | AMLDP201801 |
| Luiz DePalma - Just Another Record | 2018 | Digital EP | Audiomotion Recordings | AMLDP201802 |
| Luiz DePalma - The Secret Life Of Synths 3 | 2018 | Digital album | Audiomotion Recordings | AMLDP201803 |
| Dusty Skateboard - Volume 2 | 2018 | Digital EP | Audiomotion Recordings | AMDS002 |
| Luiz DePalma - DOG2019 | 2019 | Digital double album | Audiomotion Recordings | AMLDP201901 |
| Luiz DePalma - Hardball EP | 2019 | Digital EP | Audiomotion Recordings | AMLDP201902 |
| Tapeslave - Tapes Up | 2019 | Digital album | Audiomotion Recordings | AMTS004TU |
| Luiz DePalma - Songs in the key of Sophie | 2019 | Digital album | Audiomotion Recordings | AMR333 |
| Sebastian just Sebastian - Antipop | 2020 | Album | Audiomotion Recordings | AMSEB16969MLX |
| Sebastian just Sebastian - Don't Break The Silence | 2021 | Album | Audiomotion Recordings | AMSIFU1 |
| Proxy Page - Shapes | 2021 | Album - bandcamp album | Audiomotion Recordings | AMPP111 |
| Proxy Page - Clubbin' | 2022 | Album | Zeroaudio | ZA022 |
