= Lukas Simonis =

Dutch guitarist

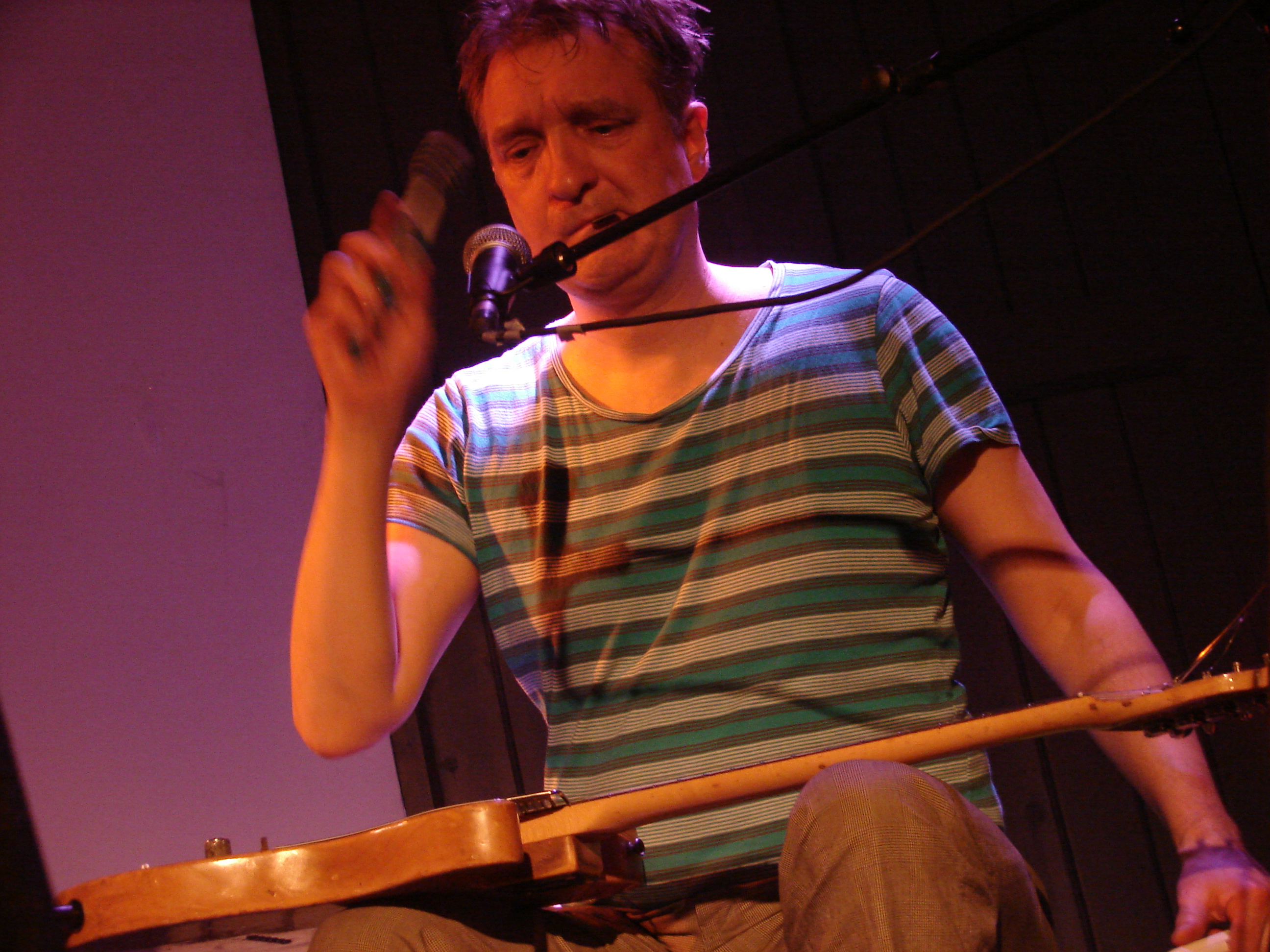
- Lukas Simonis at Apricot My Lady @ ass-crack stage-hack, 2009

Background information
- Genres: noise rock, experimental music, improvised music
- Occupations: Guitarist, Composer
- Instrument: guitar
- Years active: 1979–present

Lukas Simonis is a Dutch guitarist, mainly active in experimental music and sound art. Besides his career as a musician he's also involved with the Rotterdam-based avant garde venue WORM. and runs the music lab of the venue.

Simonis published a book in 1979 entitled Slime in the early '80s. At the same time Simonis started his musical career in Dutch punk and experimental bands such as Demogorgon, Dull Schicksal, Morzelpronk, Trespassers W and later Aa Kismet, Vril (both with Bob Drake), Static Tics, Coolhaven and became involved with the venues The Jazz Bunker and Dodorama. Dodorama would later become the venue WORM.

Dull Schicksal is a band active from 1984 til 1997 consisting (ao.) of Simonis, Hajo Doorn, Colin Mclure, Henk Bakker. From the mid-1990s on, Simonis started doing projects with a large series of experimental musicians such as Pierre Bastien, Eugene Chadbourne, and Anne La Berge. VRIL is a collaboration of Chris Cutler, Bob Drake, Lukas Simonis and Alan Jenkins. Apricot My Lady is Adam Bohman, Anne La Berge, Jonathan Bohman and Simonis. In 2006 the CD Collaborations was released on which Simonis works with Anne La Berge, Greg Malcom, Henk Bakker, Hilary Jeffery, Huib Emmer, Julia Eckhardt, Paolo Angeli, Paul Dunmal, and Rohan Thomas. In 2007 he made the CD A Sure Sign Of Something with Peter Stampfel, (and Nina Hitz and Alan Purves). Ornament & Crime Arkhestra consisted of Alain Neffe, Han Buhrs, Harald Ingenhag, Lukas Simonis, Nadine Bal, Viola Kramer. In 2011 he did the movie sound track for the short film Illusies with G.W. Sok (ex-singer of The Ex), after which they started the band 'Zoikle'. Simonis is also working for Dutch (VPRO Radio 6, Cafe Sonore) and international (ao. Radia network) radio, producing and curating radiophonic pieces and radioplays.

== Discography ==
- Lukas Simonis & Pierre Bastien - Mots D'Heure: Gousses, Rames, (CD) In-Poly-Sons, 2002 In-Poly-Sons
- Stots, CD 2006 Z6
- Lukas Simonis - Stots, (CD), Z6[5], 2006
- Lukas Simonis - Collaborations (w/ various artists), (CD), Herbal records, 2006
- Lukas Simonis & Takayuki Kawabata - News, (CD/LP) Z6Records, 2007
- Anne La Berge & Lukas Simonis - Rust Fungus, CD 2010 Z6
- Candlesnuffer & Lukas Simonis - Nature Stands Aside, CD/LP 2011 hellosQuare Recordings, Z6
- Zoikle (Simons, G.W. Sok and others) - Illusies 1 & 2, 7, 2011
- Lukas Simonis & Goh Lee Kwang - First Album + Bonus EP (CD) Herbal records, 2012

=== Aa Kismet ===
- Where's The Rest Of Me? (CD/LP), ADM, 1999
- What's The Use Of Crying When The Wolves Have Arrived (CD/LP/Dig) Z6, 2001

=== VRIL ===
- The Fatal Duckpond (CD) ReR Megacorp, 2009
- Effigies in Cork (CD) ReR Megacorp, 2006
- VRILfilms (DVD) Z6Records 2011

=== Coolhaven ===
- Blue Moustache (CD/LP/dig) z6 2001
- Trømblocque Phantasiën (CD/LP) Taple, 2006
- Felix Kubin & Coolhaven - There Is A Garden b/w Waschzwangmama (7" Single) A-Musik 2006
- Felix Kubin & Coolhaven - Suppe fur die nacht (CD) Korm Plastics, 2007
- Bobby Conn/Coolhaven - Bigmag. III POLYTOPIA - For The Quasi Crystals (12", Pic, Ltd) Drop Of Blood Records 2008

=== Dull Schicksal ===
- Eva Braun (EP) Golden Mercy 1984
- This Side Of Toilet Rug (LP) Golden Mercy 1985
- Your Aunt In Her Cupboard (LP) A Deaf Mute 1989
- My Tree Has As Much Branches As Roots (7") Golden Mercy 1989
- They Saved Hitler's Brain (CD, LP) ADM Records 1990
- Neem Die Pijp Uit Je Muil, Jij Hond (CD, LP) ADM Records 1992
- Dikke Mannen (CD, LP) ADM Records 1993
- Herfstblad'ren (CD, LP) AMF - Music 1994
- Ambush (CD, LP) AMF - Music 1997

=== Trespasser W ===
- Pretty Lips Are Red (LP) Dead Man's Curve 1987
- Dummy (2xLP, Album) TW 1988
- Potemkin (LP, Album) TW 1989
- Roots & Locations (LP) ADM, TW 1991
- Fly Up In The Face Of Life (CD, Album) AMF - Music 1996
- Leaping The Chasm (CD, Album) Organic 1999
- Pretty Lips Are Red & The Ghost Of The Jivaro Warrior (CD, Album, Ltd + Box, Ltd) Mecanique Populaire 2002

==== Singles and EPs ====
- Macht Kaputt (7", EP) ADM 1989
- Kinder e.p. (10") TW 1991

=== Liana Flu Winks ===
- Sunshine Furball (CD) Z6records, 2002
- The Discombobulators (CD) Z6records, 2004
- Hay Test Grits (CD) Z6records, 2012

=== Other ===
- with Estos Noson Pagagos - Hebban Olla Vogalas (CD) Pri-Ma Records 1995,
- with Ornament & Crime Arkestra - Farbe Couleur, Colors (CD) AMF, 1995
- with Morzelpronk - No Light, No House (CD) 1994, Kl’mpenzorro (CD) 2000
- with The Rosebuds - The Rosebud Mystery (K7) 1995
- with The Rhinestones and Kathenka - Chelsea Girl (CD) 1998
- with Eugene Chadbourne and the Insect and Western Party - Beauty and the Bloodsucker (CD) Leo Records, 1999
- with; Faces - Tijdlus (DVD, 2010)
- with; Apricot My Lady - Newly Refurbished And Tussock Moth (CDr/LP) esc.rec. 2009
- with; Perfect Vacuum - A Guide to the Music of the 21st Century (CD) Acid Soxx, 2009
- with; Zoikle (Simonis, G.W. Sok and others) - Illusies 1 & 2, (7”) 2011
- with; Kodi & Pausa - In one week and new toys to play (CD) Korm plastics, 2005
- with; Peter Stampfel & the Worm All-Stars - A Sure Sign of Something (CD) Acid Soxx, 2010
- with; The Static Tics - My favorite Tics (CD) Z6records, 2011
