= Namosh =

German musician, artist, actor and DJ

- Born: 8 May 1981 (age 44); Bietigheim-Bissingen, Baden-Württemberg, West Germany
- Occupations: Musician, singer, performance-artist, actor and DJ
- Website: namosh.de

Namosh (born 8 May 1981), also known as Erkan Arslan, Namosh E. Arslan or Namosh Erkan Arslan, is a German singer, musician, performance artist, actor and DJ of Kurdish descent.

== Life and work ==
Namosh has lived in Berlin since 1999 and is known for his eccentric and wild live performances. He performs mostly solo or with other artists at various events.

He has worked with a lot of well known artists and musicians such as Peter Thomas, Wolfgang Müller and Angie Reed, performing or producing music together with them. In the music magazine Q, Björk described Namosh's song "Cold Cream" as her favourite song of 2005. The song appeared on his first album Moccatongue, which was released in 2006. It was followed by Keep It for Later. This, his second album, was released in 2009.

In addition to his musical activities Namosh has worked as actor. He played the lead role in the Children's theatre play Kleider machen Leute at Theater an der Parkaue in Berlin. Reviewers of the newspapers Der Tagesspiegel and Berliner Zeitung praised his performance in the play.

In 2018 Namosh's album Music Muscle was released by the record label Weltgast as CD, LP and download. His latest album Party Alone was digitally released on June 13, 2022.

== Discography (selection) ==
=== Music ===
- 2004: Namosh (LP, Album, Pale Music International)
- 2005: Cold Cream (12", Bungalow Records)
- 2005: Messed Up w/ Angie Reed/ Hi-End (12", Metroheadmusic)
- 2005: The Pulse (12", Bungalow Records)
- 2005: Wolfgang Müller & Namosh / Frieder Butzmann - 25 Jahre Geniale Dilletanten (7", Crippled Dick Hot Wax)
- 2006: Dear Diary feat. Hisako / Fine! Adam Sky Remix (7", single, Ltd, Bungalow Records)
- 2006: Moccatongue (CD, Double LP, Album, enh, Bungalow Records/Rough Trade Records/PIAS)
- 2007: Schocko & Co (limited book-CD, Hybriden Verlag/Mimas Atlas)
- 2009: Keep It for Later (CD, album, Crippled Dick Hot Wax)
- 2011: Keep It For Later (MP3/WAV, Track on the Compilation album Jerk Off , Zingy)
- 2018: Music Muscle (CD, LP, MP3/WAV, Album, Weltgast)
- 2020: Music Muscle - The Rework (MP3/WAV, Album, Weltgast)
- 2021: Moccatongue - The Reroll (MP3/WAV, Album, Weltgast)
- 2022: Party Alone (MP3/WAV, Album, Weltgast)

=== Production ===
- 2004: Namosh (LP, Pale Music International)
- 2006: Moccatongue (CD, album, Enh, Bungalow Records/Rough Trade Records/PIAS)
- 2008: Mit - Coda (CD, album, Haute Areal)
- 2009: Keep It for Later (CD, album, Crippled Dick Hot Wax)

=== Miscellaneous ===
- 2005: Angie Reed – Hustle A Hustler (12" or CD, Chicks On Speed Records), (Hustle A Hustler (Namosh Remix))
- 2009: Jessie Evans – Is It Fire? (LP or CD, Fantomette Records), (author, bass, keyboards on Black Sand and choral singing on To The Sun)
- 2012: Wolfgang Müller – "Séance Vocibus Avium" & "Wísk Niwáhsen Wísk Nikahseriiè:Take Kanien'Kéha Wa'Katéweienste" Oder "Learning Mohawk In Fifty-five Minutes" (double CD, Intermedium Records), (birdcall on Coturnix Novae-Zelandiae)
- 2013: Die Tödliche Doris – Stopp (Der Information) - Unvollendete Version 1983 (12", Squoodge Records), (editing)

== Other creative works ==
- 2012: Children's theater play Kleider machen Leute at Theater an der Parkaue in Berlin (actor)
- 2026: The Soloists (Die Solisten) (documentary film), (music)

== Trivia ==
- The German actors Daniel Steiner and Nic Romm shot a music video together for Namosh's song Cold Cream.
