= Martha Colburn =

American filmmaker and artist (born 1971)

- Born: May 5, 1971 (age 55)
- Education: Maryland Institute College of Art
- Occupations: filmmaker and artist

Martha Colburn (born May 5, 1971) is an American filmmaker and artist. She is best known for her animation films, which are created through puppetry, collage, and paint on glass techniques. She also makes installations and performs her films with live musical performance. She has cited music and film as her inspirations in puppeteering.

== Early life and education ==
Colburn spent her childhood near the Appalachian Mountains between Gettysburg and Harrisburg, Pennsylvania. She began making art at a very young age, but did not start working with film until 1994. In an interview with Blank Screen Media, Colburn discusses her past and present influences for making art: "In high school it was politics and history and then in my twenties I made around 50 music films and now I am back to the political and historical films."

Colburn left the Appalachians to attended the Maryland Institute College of Art in Baltimore. Her primary focus in school was visual arts, yet she also began to become involved in the Baltimore experimental music scene. Although disillusioned by the time she graduated in 1994, Colburn nevertheless decided to stay in Baltimore and further immerse herself in the city’s artistic community.

== Career ==
It was around the time of finishing college that Colburn first began to work with film. Her motivation to work with film arose partially from finding 16mm reels of old educational movies. Acrophobic Babies and Feature Presentation are two early examples of Colburn working within this process. By scratching, tinting, and splicing the film itself, Colburn made her first filmic pieces through her manipulation of appropriated imagery.

After discovering Super-8 in 1995, Colburn switched from 16mm to 8mm. Her initial explorations in puppetry and animation are simultaneous with her shift in film formats. Caffeine Jam is one of her first animated films, while Killer Tunes is animation using marionettes. Colburn continues to develop and enrich her animation to an even greater complexity of form, materials, and concepts. During an interview with Metropolis M Magazine, Colburn asserted her love for animation: "animation is magical, it’s making gold out of glitter."

After ten years of living in Baltimore, Colburn moved to Amsterdam in 2000 after being offered a two-year residency at the Rijksakademie. During her residency, Colburn made numerous films including Skelehellavision, an animated and hand-colored film mixing images of female pornography stars and skulls, and Big Bug Attack, a film whose soundtrack was a collaborative piece between Colburn and German techno artist Felix Kubin. Once finishing up her residency, Colburn spent another three years in the Netherlands making films until returning to the United States in 2005.

Once settling between Long Island City, New York and Amsterdam, NL, Colburn began work on films that dealt more closely with American history and its relationship to the country’s foreign and domestic policies. Destiny Manifesto incorporates images of the American frontier with depictions of the conflict in the Middle East. Meet Me in Wichita is a parody of The Wizard of Oz in which Osama bin Laden substitutes for all of Oz’s characters aside from Dorothy, the story’s heroine. "I am making films that work with ideas of the loss of faith, obsession with spectacle, self destructiveness, compulsion for violence," Colburn said in Metropolis M Magazine about her work of most recent years. "Inhibition and fear characterize my work, as uninhibited and fearless they may appear." As far as the effects of returning to her native country after spending time in Europe, Colburn believes her work has gotten increasingly concerned with political issues facing the world today.

Colburn has also used animation for music videos. She created pieces to accompany the San Francisco-based band Deerhoof’s song "Wrong Time Capsule" in 2005 and Serj Tankian’s "Lie, Lie, Lie" in 2007. Yet these projects come as no surprise given the strong relationship Colburn has always had with music. She even created animation for the 2005 documentary about the musician Daniel Johnston entitled The Devil and Daniel Johnston. Colburn’s latest film, Myth Labs, has not just been screened, but also presented as panels of which the film is composed.

== Collage work ==
Colburn’s style of collage fuses pop culture and political imagery with an aesthetic that is simultaneously fantastical, painterly, and punk rock. Many of her appropriated images are painted over with a diverse variety of paints which integrate them with the drawings and textures that are completely her own. Colburn animated by facing the camera directly downward at the collaged panels below. The "hands-on," non-technological quality that defines her process keeps her films at a personal and intimate level. Color is another very important aspect of Colburn’s films. Although her 2006 film Meet Me in Wichita deals with disconcerting subject matter, Colburn still chooses bright colors to define the film’s color scheme. It is these types of contradictions in Colburn’s work which deepen her visual and conceptual complexity. Colburn was featured in the April 2011 issue of Art in America.

== Films ==
- 2018 Scenario (music video for Orquesta del Tiempo Perdido) https://vimeo.com/272193217
- 2017 Western Wild…or how I found Wanderlust and met Old Shatterhand trailer: https://vimeo.com/247800463
- 2017 Collaboration with the performance artist ‘Narcissister’ feature film ‘Organ Player’ http://www.narcissister.com/
- 2017 The Wonders of Nature (film for Exhibition on Dutch artist Jan Velten) excerpt: https://vimeo.com/232670216
- 2017 Walls & Wills (soundtrack by Amy Colburn- banjo)
- 2017 Snakebit (music video with United Bakery Records) excerpt: https://vimeo.com/215865361
- 2016 Pug Adventures: A Journey Into the Reproductive System (produced for AMAZE Sex-Ed) https://vimeo.com/182518717
- 2016 Standing with Standing Rock (soundtrack by) https://thedustdiveflash.bandcamp.com/
- 2016 Trump N Bass
- 2016 Trump N Steak
- 2015 Haunted Denmark: Ghostly Tales of Witchcraft, Plague, Madness and War (film for a book by Jack Stevenson)
- 2014 'Day of the Dutch' (soundtrack by Felix Kubin and Nikos Kanadarakis) (original composition by Composer Felipe Waller- performed by Slagwerk Deb Haag - http://www.slagwerkdenhaag.nl/en/productions/music-bones
- 2013 'Metamorfoza' (premiered with live accompaniment by The Rotterdam Philharmonic Orchestra Rotterdam Philharmonic Orchestra. Conducted by Yannick Nézet-Séguin Yannick Nezet-Seguin. Composed by Juan Felipe Waller . trailer: https://vimeo.com/135200624
- 2012 'Colony Collapse Disorder' (music video for Mystical Weapons) https://www.youtube.com/watch?v=meO8RiYOILY
- 2012 'Mechanical Mammoth' (music video for Mystical Weapons) https://www.youtube.com/watch?v=z_YMK4U9nmM
- 2011 'Anti-Fracture Mining Film' (commission of WBAI radio)
- 2010 'DOLLS VS. DICTATORS' (commission of Museum of Moving Image- Queens, NY)
- 2009 'Triumph of the Wild' (soundtrack by Thollem Mc Donas)
- 2009 'Join the Freedom Force' (commission of the TAX videoclip fonds-soundtrack by Knalpot)
- 2009 'Electric Literature' (for author Diana Wagman -soundtrack by Nick de Witt )
- 2009 'One and One is Life'Soundtrack by Thollem McDonas
- 2008 'Myth Labs'Soundtrack by Mike Evans, Laura Ortman, Ryan Sawyer, Matt Marinelli
- 2007 'Don't Kill the Weatherman!' (commission from Rosenbach Museum and Library)Soundtrack by Martha Colby https://www.marthacolbymusic.com/, Mike Evans http://www.michaelevanssounds.com/about,Greg Purnhagen http://www.gregpurnhagen.com/Gregory_Purnhagen_Gomez/Home.html.
- 2007 'Dispel'Piano Soundtrack by Thollem McDonas http://thollem.com/index.html
- 2007 'Lie, Lie, Lie' (music video for Serj Tankian) https://www.youtube.com/watch?v=zd7yyJLQHVk
- 2006 'Meet Me In Wichita' (soundtrack by Jad Fair and V.Vale)
- 2006 'Destiny Manifesto' (soundtrack by Haleh Abghari http://www.halehabghari.com/, Michael Evans and Nathan Whipple https://www.printedmatter.org/catalog/27527/)
- 2006 'Waschdrang Mama' (music video for Felix Kubin)
- 2005 'Wrong Time Capsule' (music video for Deerhoof )
- 2005 'Cosmetic Emergency' (collage soundtrack featuring Jad Fair and Coco Solid)
- 2004 'A Little Dutch Thrill' (soundtrack by the Liuanna Flu Winks)
- 2004 'XXX Amsterdam' (soundtrack by Hilary Jeffery) https://www.hiljef.com/
- 2003 'Secrets of Mexuality' (soundtrack by composer Juan Felipe Waller)
- 2002 'Groscher Lansangriff: Big Bug Attack' (music video for Felix Kubin)
- 2002 'Cats Amore' (soundtrack featuring Jacques Berrocal and James Chance)
- 2001 'Skelehellavision' (collage soundtrack by Martha Colburn)
- 2000 'Spiders In Love: An Arachnogasmic Musical' (soundtrack by Jad Fair and Red Balloon)
- 1999 'Lift Off' (soundtrack by Jad Fair and Jason Willett Jason Willett)
- 1998 'A Toetally Solefull Feeture Pedsintation' (music by the Dramatics)
- 1998 'There's A Pervert In Our Pool!' (poem by Fred Collins)
- 1997 'What's On?' (poem by 99 Hooker-music by Naval Cassidy)
- 1997 'Evil Of Dracula' (music by Jad Fair and Jason Willett)
- 1997 'Ode To A Busdriver' (poem by 99 Hooker https://www.99hooker.com/-music by Naval Cassidy) http://freemusicarchive.org/music/Naval_Cassidy/
- 1997 'I Can't Keep Up' (poem by 99 Hooker-music by Naval Cassidy)
- 1997 'Persecution in Paradise' (soundtrack by the Dramatics) https://soundcloud.com/marthacolburn/the-dramatics-tape
- 1996 'Cholesterol'(soundtrack by the Dramatics)
- 1996 'Dog Chow'(soundtrack by the Dramatics)
- 1996 'Hey Tiger' (soundtrack by the Dramatics)
- 1996 'Uberfall: Pee Poo and Flies' (soundtrack by the Dramatics)
- 1996 'I'm Gonna' (poem by 99 Hooker-music by Naval Cassidy)
- 1996 'My Secret Shame' (poem by 99 Hooker-music by Naval Cassidy)
- 1996 'Who Knows?' (soundtrack by the Dramatics)
- 1996 'Kiwi and Wally' (soundtrack by the Dramatics)
- 1996 'Killer Tunes' (soundtrack by the Dramatics)
- 1995 'Improvisation' (soundtrack by the Dramatics)
- 1995 'Caffeine Jam' (soundtrack by the Jaunties)
- 1995 'Caroline Kraabel Solo' Caroline Kraabel
- 1995 'Zig Zag' (soundtrack by the Jaunties)
- 1995 'Live Frazz' (soundtrack by the Jaunties)
- 1995 'Asthma' (soundtrack by the Jaunties)
- 1995 'Alcohol' (soundtrack by the Jaunties)
- 1994 'Feature Presentation' (soundtrack by the Dramatics)
- 1994 'First Film In X-Tro' (soundtrack by the Dramatics)
- 1994 'Acrophobic Babies'

== Past exhibitions ==
1. Adults in the Dark: Avant-Garde Animation, Museum of Arts and Design, New York, NY
2. Collage in Motion, Los Angeles Contemporary Art Museum, Los Angeles, CA
3. New Media Series—Martha Colburn: Triumph of the Wild, St. Louis Art Museum, St. Louis, MO
4. Martha Colburn: Dolls vs. Dictators, Museum of the Moving Image, NY
5. Bending the Mirror, Columbus College of Art and Design, Columbus, OH
6. The Air We Breathe, San Francisco Museum of Modern Art, San Francisco, CA
7. Martha Colburn, Philadelphia Museum of Art, Philadelphia, PA
