= David LaBerge =

American neuropsychologist

David LaBerge (born 1929) is a neuropsychologist specializing in the attention process and the role of apical dendrites in cognition and consciousness.

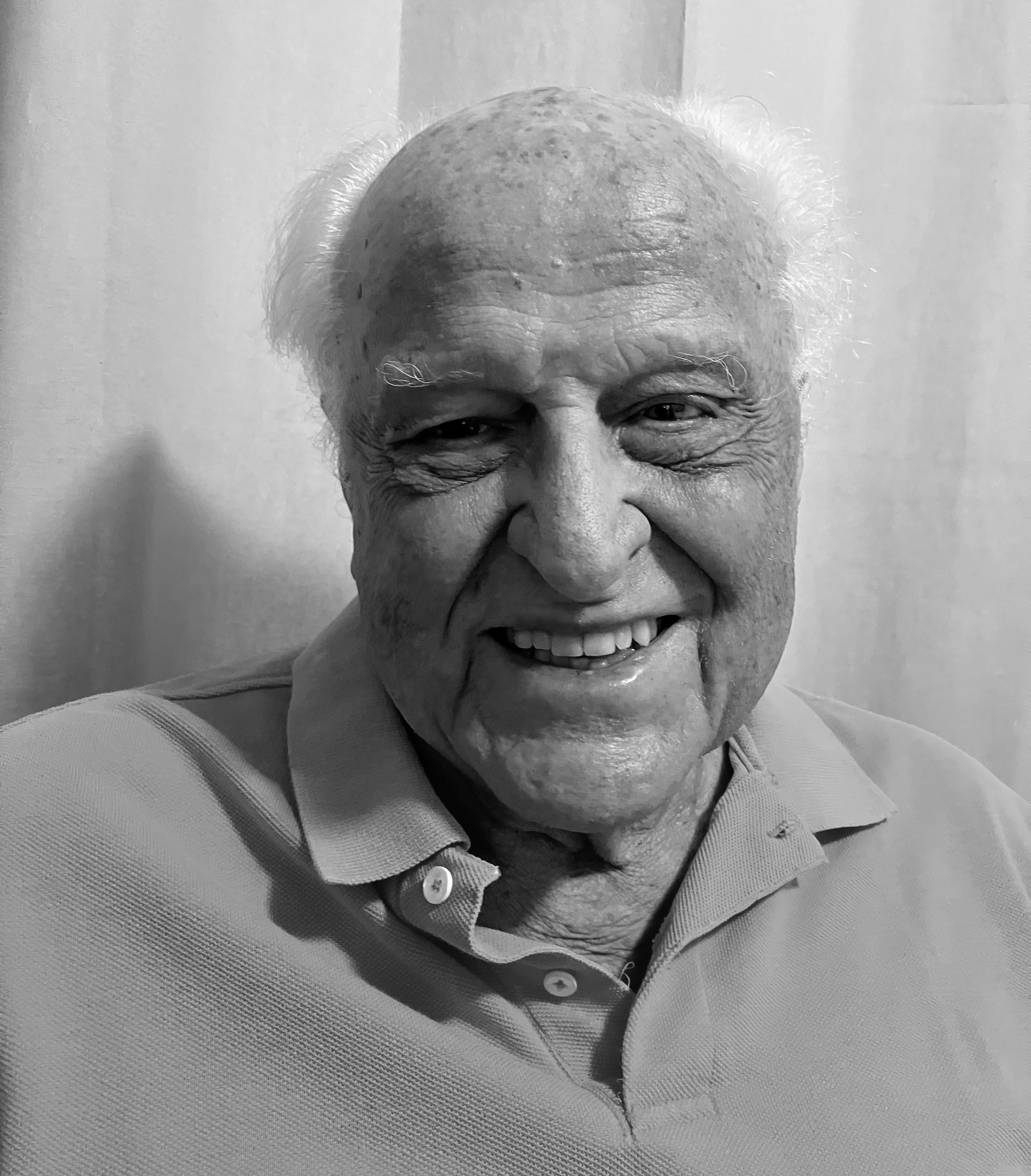
David LaBerge

== Early life and education ==
David LaBerge was born in St. Louis, Missouri and received his undergraduate degree from the College of Wooster, his MA degree from Claremont University and his PhD degree Stanford University.

== Career ==
Dr. LaBerge has taught at Indiana University, Bloomington, University of Minnesota, and University of California at Irvine from 1955 until 1997. He was also a member of the adjunct faculty in psychology and biology at Bard College at Simon's Rock from 1997 to 2007 and was a visiting scholar at the University of Washington, Seattle from 2009 - 2011.

== Honors ==
Distinguished Teaching Award, College of Liberal Arts, University of Minnesota; University of Minnesota Students Association Distinguished Service Award. Fellow, Society of Experimental Psychologists. Fellow AAAS. Fellow American Psychological Association. Fellow, American Psychological Society. Member Society for Neuroscience.

== Research ==
1. Mathematical models of choice behavior:
A model for neutral elements (1959a, b) provided a way to represent noise elements in the Estes and Burke (1953) choice theory. A recruitment model for choice behavior (1962, 1994) assumes that processing a stimulus involves the recruiting (or accumulation) of elements by alternative response counters until a criterion number is reached and the corresponding response is evoked. Predictive comparisons of two mathematical models of choice: the Counting Model (Accumulator Model) and the Random Walk Model. LaBerge, Journal of Mathematical Psychology (1994).
2. Early experiments of attention in response time experiments:
Stimulus processing is biased by relative frequency of presentation (1964), by incentive value (1967), and by inserting an informative cue into a trial (1970).

LaBerge conducted a study regarding attention and the measurement of perceptual learning. In the primary trial, participants were shown a letter and therefore had to press a key on their keyboard when they saw it in a pattern of letters. The secondary trial did not provide a cue and instead had participants respond when they saw a set of matching letters in the pattern. When unfamiliar letters were presented, participants were evaluating the letters' features and organizing the letters into a schema. LaBerge's study supported automaticity of reading and provided a basis for how perceptual learning is achieved. Perceptual learning requires participants to focus on the actual stimuli as a whole and not just the features so they can be quickly organized and understood.
3. Studies of automaticity:
Measurement of automatic processing (1973a). A theory of automaticity in reading (1974) with S.J. Samuels. A theory of automaticity in perception (1975).

The theory of automaticity involves unitization of perceptual patterns. LaBerge's research categorizes attention and information processing through processing within vs. between systems. Simply put, stimuli are broken down and put into a box, which is then further separated into another box to understand the stimuli's meaning. Within processing involves the unitization of information, which is consolidated into long-term memory overtime, automatically processing familiar patterns. Unitization further achieves perceptual learning. Between systems processing thus involves taking an association built through attention to properly identify its meaning. Semantic information is regarded as being between systems by LaBerge, contributing to the automaticity of reading and learning.
4. Measuring the spread of attention in visual space (1983, 1989).
5. Shifting attention by sense modality (1973b) and across visual space (1997).
6. Studies of thalamic involvement in selective attention:
A brain scan study of the human pulvinar during sustained selective attention (1990) with Monte Buchsbaum. A neural network simulation study of thalamic circuit operations in selective attention (1992).
7. Development of a test for preparatory attention to location (2000) with Eric Sieroff, and tests of patients (2004, 2005).
8. Development of a cortex-wide circuit theory of attention:
The Triangular Circuit of Attention, (1995, 1997).
9. Development of an apical dendrite theory of cognition, attention, and consciousness.
10. The neural foundation of experience: the role of vibrating neurons. LaBerge, D, Dorrance Publishing Co., (2020)
A series of papers explored the hypothesis that the apical dendrite is not "just another dendrite" but has its own special functions (2001, 2002, 2005, 2006, 2007).
The hypothesis that the apical dendrite resonates was illustrated informally by LaBerge and his daughter, Anne La Berge in three performances of a work entitled Resonant Dendrites, (2006, 2007, 2009), which featured film, narrative voice samples and music.
A formal description of a theory of electric resonance in apical dendrites appeared in an article by Kasevich & LaBerge (2010), which shows how an apical dendrite can fine tune its own membrane oscillations to a specific peak frequency, and narrow the width of the resonance curve around this peak to less than 1 Hz. This refinement enables its associated cortical circuit to generate a specific resonant ("carrier") frequency by which the circuit can separate its signaling from that of other circuits.
A more recent article by LaBerge & Kasevich (2013) describes signaling by neurons as the neural correlate of objective information processing and resonating in clusters of apical dendrites as the neural correlate of subjective impressions (e.g., impressions of sounds, colors, and feelings). These two "articles provide theoretical support for the hypothesis that apical dendrite resonance supplements neural signaling as a major mode of neural function. Furthermore, the resonance-based subjective impressions may be regarded as the contents of consciousness.

== The Role of Apical Dendrites ==
Apical dendrites are long and thick branches that extend from the cell body to reach and connect cortical layers with other pyramidal neurons. The apical dendrite's primary function is to receive feedback information from cortical areas, integrate, and thus send an electrical current through the axon. The action potentials elicited from the apical dendrites, however, are smaller but last longer at the cell body, modulating inputs. LaBerge additionally hypothesized that apical dendrites sustain attention through feedback information, which involves top-down processing, being amplified. The strength of the activity by apical dendrites is linked to a Hebbian cell assembly. The Hebbian cell assembly form involves strong excitatory connections on the inside and weaker neuron connections on the outside. The assembly then self-sustains excitatory activity from the neurons to prolong the consolidation of information to memory.

Pyramidal neurons are found in the mammalian cortex and include both the basal dendrites (2) that receive information and apical dendrites (3), which modulate the inputs.

== LaBerge's Contribution to Attention ==
A series of papers highlighted attention regarding the triangular circuit. The triangular circuit involves three activity sites, expression, enhancement, and control. This circuit includes the prefrontal cortex, thalamus, and posterior cortical areas. Additionally, attention can be automatic or controlled. A controlled expression will contain a feedback loop, which maintains a neural expression, or feedforward component, which amplifies the expression. The attention module is further controlled by instruction, which directs attention to specific and straightforward features. Controlling attention thus involves a modular mode, which is automatic, fixed, brief, and routinized, or a preamble mode, which is controlled, flexible, prolonged, and voluntary. Further, the modular mode condenses external information, creating direct associations and links, filtering out irrelevant information based on attention. Additionally, the preamble mode depends on the modular mode, altering the neural expression through the encapsulation of information taken in by the modular mode. LaBerge's contribution to understanding attention further provided the foundation to specifically understanding the role of apical dendrites in attention. LaBerge noted that attention does not require awareness, meaning that without direct and sustained action from the self, the information is not properly encoded and later expressed. Attention can therefore be either brief or prolonged; however, information can be selectively attuned to due to apical dendrites and thus the Hebbian cell assembly.

== Life ==
His major extracurricular activity was to serve for 21 years as music director and Conductor of the Minnesota Bach Society Orchestra and Chorus from 1959 to 1980. During his time at the Bach Society, he reorganized the construction of music and reinstated the annual Bach Festival. He was the director of the 50-voice South Sound Classical Choir in the Tacoma, WA area until May 2019.

He resides in Tacoma, Washington with his wife Janice Lawry.
