= A-Musik =

German record label

Coordinates: 50°55′55″N 6°56′54″E

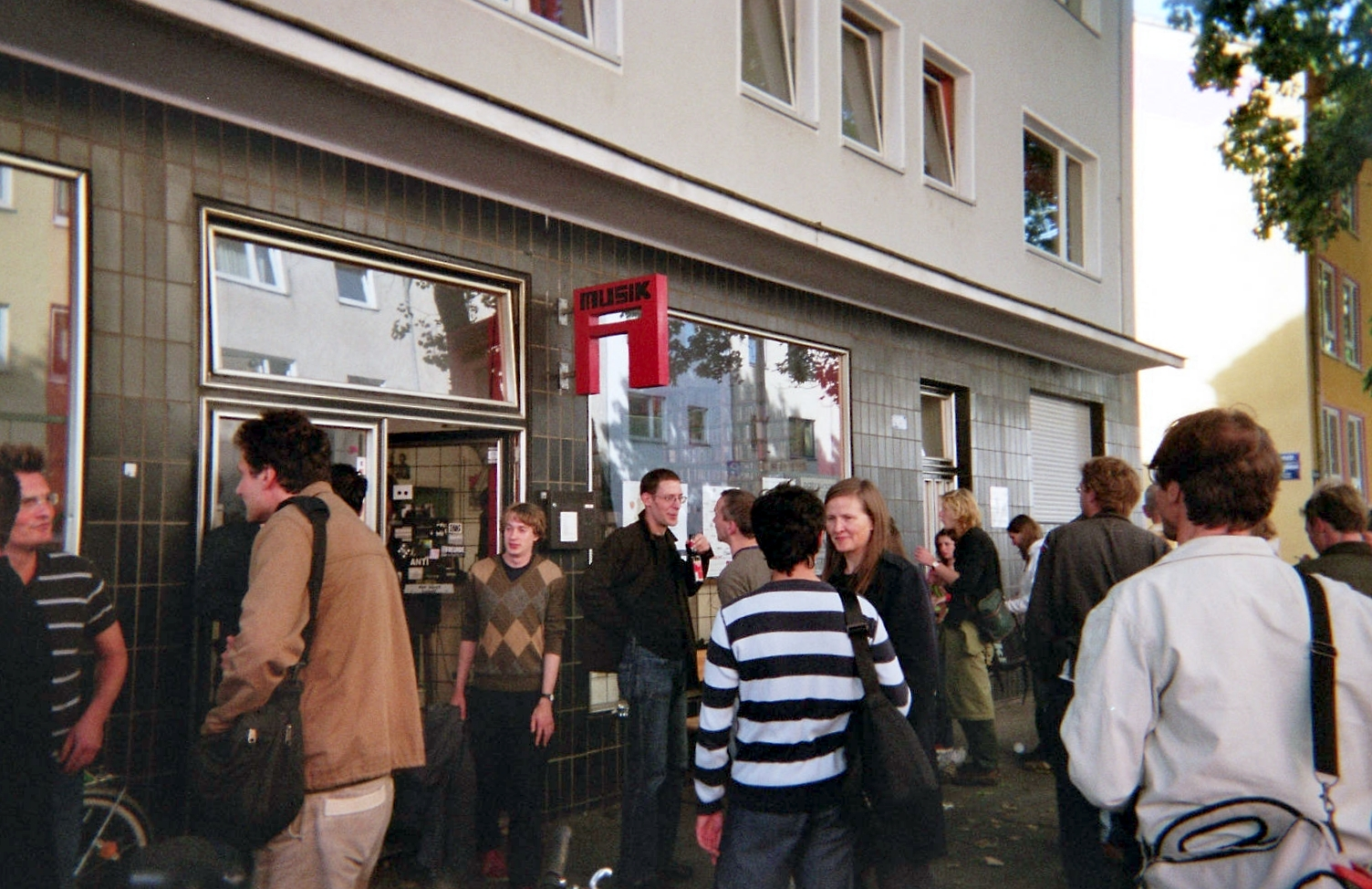
The store at the 10th jubilee party

A-Musik is a record label for experimental electronic music, a record distributor and a music store. A-Musik is based in Cologne and was founded in 1995 by Georg Odijk.

== Artists on A-Musik ==
- Schlammpeitziger
- Wolfgang Müller
- Marcus Schmickler (Wabi Sabi)
- DAT Politics
- Felix Kubin
- Lithops
- Microstoria
- Lukas Simonis (Coolhaven)

== See also ==
- List of record labels
