= Jessie Evans (singer) =

American singer

Jessie Evans is an American born songwriter, singer, saxophonist, and record producer currently residing in Brazil. On stage, while based out of Berlin, she was often accompanied by Iggy Pop's drummer, Toby Dammit.

Her first solo album Is it fire? was released on her label 'Fantomette Records' in November 2009. The sessions were recorded with drummer Budgie of bands Siouxsie and the Banshees and The Creatures. In 2011, in Berlin, a video collaboration for Black Sand –song from her first album– was released. Among the participants were renowned artists Toby Dammit, King Khan from King Khan and the Shrines and Namosh. The video was directed by Evans and Azul Violeta Bermejo.

Evans' music is a sensual and exotic mix of three different genres : afro-beat, pop and electro.
