= Anne La Berge =

American composer and flutist

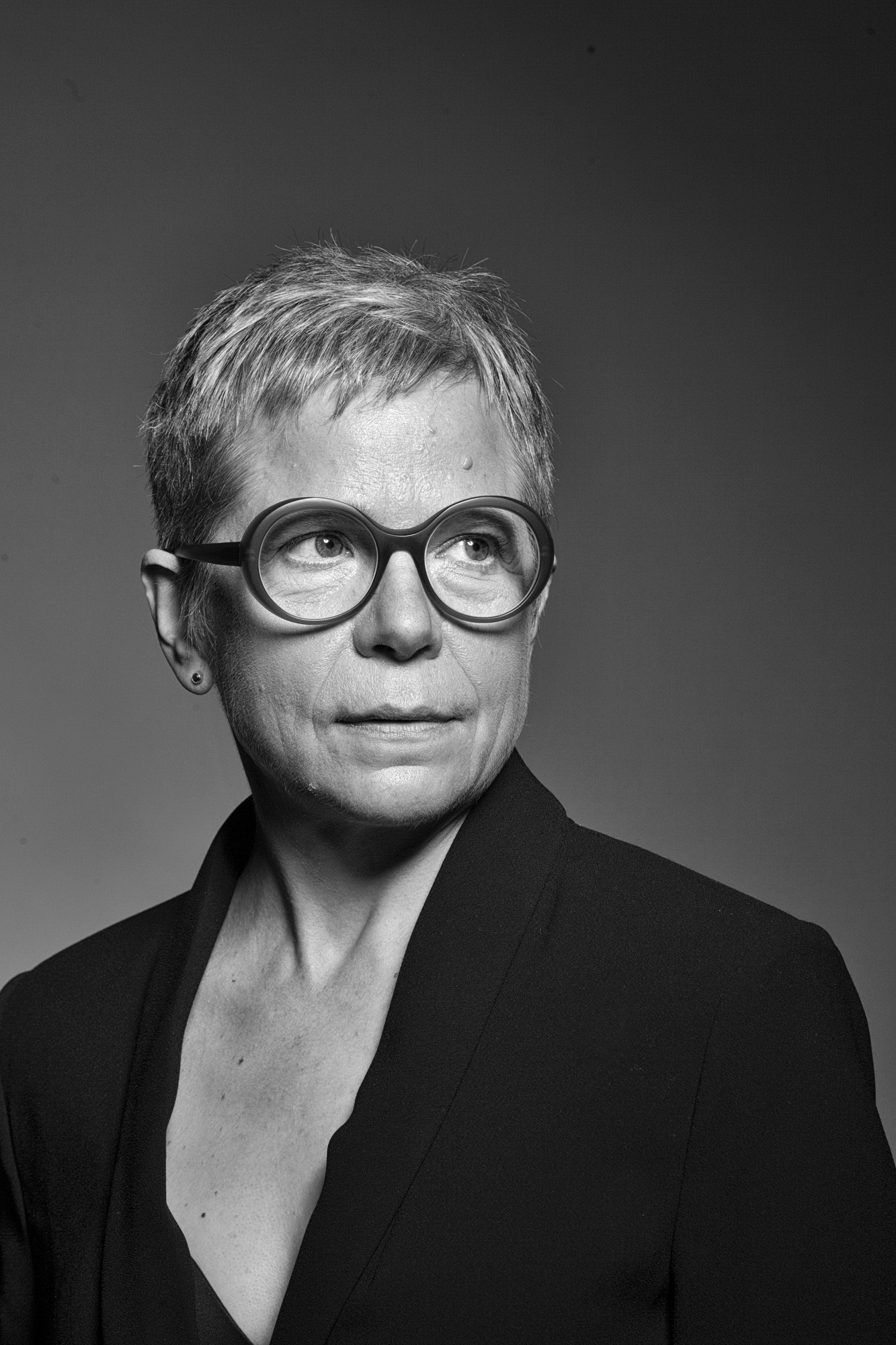
- Born: 1955 (age 70–71); Palo Alto, California, United States
- Occupations: Composer, flutist, improviser with electronics
- Era: Contemporary

Anne La Berge was born in Palo Alto, California, in 1955. Her father, David LaBerge is a neuropsychology scientist and her mother, Jane Schuneman, a violinist. She is a composer, performer and improviser, currently residing in Amsterdam. Her work grows from the social and political issues that shape the world she moves through. Many of her pieces are multi level structures where performers make choices, follow flexible cues, and shape the music together in real time.

She performs internationally as a multimedia musician and is a longtime member of the Amsterdam ensemble MAZE. She has served on the faculty at the Royal Conservatory in The Hague and worked as a coach for many organizations including the SPLICE Festival, US and the European Cortona Sessions. She has been an invited artist at both the Civitella Ranieri Foundation and the Headlands Center for the Arts.

Her instruments include the flute, electronics, controllers, live processing, and spoken text, forming her signature sound world. She builds pieces that let performers interact with computer programs through phones, tablets, and laptops, giving them real time agency in how the music unfolds. Her performances shift freely between the poetic and the political.

While pursuing PhD research at the University of California, San Diego in the mid-1980s she formed a duo with flutist John Fonville, commissioning new works and exploring extended techniques on flute, particularly with regard to microtonal scales. She moved to Amsterdam in 1989, where she has lived ever since.

In 1999, together with Steve Heather and Cor Fuhler, she founded the Kraakgeluiden, a improvisation series based in Amsterdam, exploring combinations of acoustic instruments, electronic instruments and computers, and using real-time interactive performance systems. Many of the musical collaborations that have resulted have taken on a life beyond the Kraakgeluiden series, which ceased in 2006. La Berge’s own music has evolved in parallel, and the electronics has become only one element in a sound world that includes the flute, samples, synthesis, the use of spoken text and real-time processing.

In 2006 - 2007 she collaborated with Dr. David LaBerge. This is a performance work based on Dr. La Berge's apical dendrite theory using film, narrative voice samples and music.

She performs on a set of quarter tone (Kingma system) flutes and regularly uses the Kyma (sound design language) System for audio synthesis and processing.

She can be heard on the New World Records, Z6 Records, Largo, Artifact, Etcetera, Hat Art, Frog Peak, Einstein, X-OR, Unsounds, Canal Street, Rambo, esc.rec., Data, chmafu, Carrier, verz, Splendor, Present Sounds Recordings, Wandelweiser Records, Another Timbre and Relative Pitch Records labels which include recordings as a soloist and with Lukas Simonis, Ensemble Modern, United Noise Toys, Fonville/La Berge duo, Rasp/Hasp, Bievre/La Berge duo, Apricot My Lady, the Corkestra, MAZE, Joe Williamson, Ig Henneman, Jaimie Branch, Diamanda La Berge Dramm, David Dramm, Phil Maguire, Ted Moore, Seamus Cater, Danya Pilchen and Tom Baker.

She is an active founding artist in Splendor Amsterdam, a collective of 55 musicians, composers and stage artists who have transformed an old bathhouse in the center of Amsterdam into a cultural mecca.

Anne La Berge has regularly received funding from the Dutch Funds for Composers, the Funds for the Podium Arts and the Amsterdam Funds for the Arts. She is the director of the Volsap Foundation. She also works as a freelance coach for the Amsterdam based Executive Performance Training company.

== Discography (as composer) ==
- fish-flap. Splendor Records, Bandcamp 2025.
- Cork. Splendor Records, Bandcamp 2025.
- Threw, Thru & Through. Tom Hamilton, Bandcamp 2025.
- sand. Present Sounds Recordings, 2023.
- bruit Carrier Records 056 2020. Flute and electronics with Ted Moore.
- two cities verz 2020. Electro acoustic duos by Phil Maguire and Anne La Berge.
- Dropping Stuff and Other Folk Songs Relative Pitch Records RPR1094. Free improv with Ig Henneman and Jaimie Branch.
- Modern Genetics Splendor Records 001. A triple LP with works by Dramm, La Berge and La Berge Dramm.
- three cities verz 2019. Electro acoustic duos by Phil Maguire and Anne La Berge.
- Damn chmafu nocords 2018. A compilation of women composers. Includes Utter by Anne La Berge.
- RAW LP Unsounds 2017. With MAZE.
- The Hum Unsounds 2015. With Joe Williamson.
- SPEAK New World Records 2011. Works featuring Cor Fuhler, Stephie Buttrich, Misha Myers, Josh Geffin, Amy Walker, Patrick Ozzard-Low and Anne La Berge.
- Rust Fungus Z6 Records 2010. With Lukas Simonis
- Newly Refurbished and Tussock Moth esc.rec., 2009. songs by Apricot My Lady including Adam and Jonathan Bohman and Lukas Simonis.
- rasp/hasp Ramboy #19, 2004. Improvisations with Jody Gilbert, Wilbert de Joode, Richard Barrett, Paul Lovens
- VerQuer Upala Records, 2004. Includes rough diamond.
- Radio WORM WORMrec, 2004.
- Kraakgeluiden, 2003. unsounds 06.
- Flute Moments with Theresa Beaman 1998. Laurel Records 857. Includes revamper.
- United Noise Toys live in Utrecht '98. X-OR, 1998. With Gert-Jan Prins. Features duct; yolk; nape; lurk; flap; juke; moat; pike; turf.
- Blow. Frog Peak Music, 1994. Features never again; rollin'; [sic]sauce; indeed; unengraced; revamper.
