= Wolfgang Müller (artist) =

German artist, musician, and writer (born 1957)

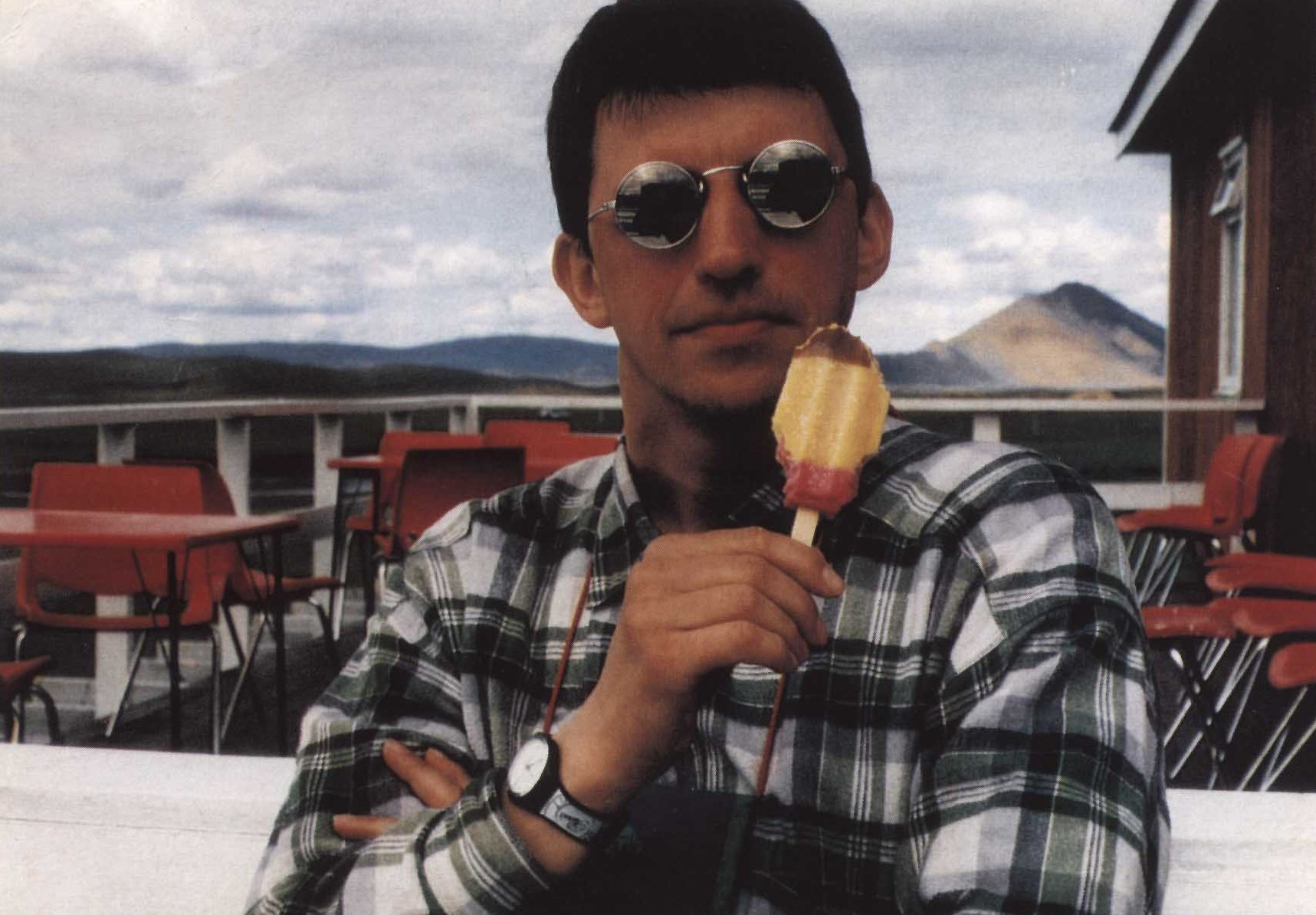
- Born: 24 October 1957 (age 68); Wolfsburg, West Germany
- Occupations: Artist musician writer
- Relatives: Max Müller (brother)
- Website: wolfgangmuellerrr.de

Wolfgang Müller (born 24 October 1957) is an artist, musician and writer, based in Berlin and Reykjavík.

Müller is the founder of the multi-media performance art group Die Tödliche Doris ('The Deadly Doris').

Müller published the book Geniale Dilletanten in 1982, naming a musical genre encompassing Die Tödliche Doris, Einstürzende Neubauten, Malaria!, Frieder Butzmann and many others.

Müller's interest in Iceland and its culture has been documented in several art projects since 1988. He has participated in arts projects in both Germany and Iceland, addressing the Icelandic culture of elves, natural and supernatural phenomena. In 1998 he transferred the music of his first record with two sign language interpreters into signs and gestures and published it as a DVD, "Gehörlose Musik/Deaf Music" in 2006.

In 2003, Cologne based record label A-Musik released Müller's album Mit Wittgenstein In Krisuvík - Zweiundzwanzig Elfensongs Für Island. In 2009, Müller published Séance Vocibus Avium, an audioplay with reconstructed sounds of extinct birds for which Müller was awarded the Karl Sczuka-Preis.

Séance Vocibus Avium was also released on record by Gothenburg based record label Fang Bomb. The record contained 11 bird calls, performed by artists such as Wolfgang Müller himself, Justus Köhncke, Namosh, Max Müller and Annette Humpe. The record came with a 40-page catalog containing Müller's illustrations of the birds.

== Discography ==
- BAT - Aus Der Schule Der Tödlichen Doris, LP, Die Tödliche Doris Schallplatten, 1989
- Mit Wittgenstein In Krisuvík - Zweiundzwanzig Elfensongs Für Island, CD/LP, A-Musik, 2003
- Wolfgang Müller & Namosh/Frieder Butzmann: 25 Jahre Geniale Diletanten, 7", Monitorpop Entertainment, 2006
- Gehörlose Musik/Deaf Music, DVD, Monitorpop Entertainment, 2006
- Séance Vocibus Avium, 7"/CD with catalogue, Fang Bomb, 2009

== Partial bibliography ==
- Geniale Dilletanten, Merve Verlag, 1982
- Die Tödliche Doris. KUNST/ART, Verlag Martin Schmitz, 1999
- Die Tödliche Doris. FILM/CINEMA, Verlag Martin Schmitz, 2003
- Neues von der Elfenfront. Die Wahrheit über Island, Suhrkamp, 2007
- Ästhetik der Präsenzen - Valeska Gert, Verlag Martin Schmitz, 2010.
