= M.I.M.E.O. =

Experimental musical group

- Genres: Electroacoustic improvisation
- Years active: 1997–present
- Members: Phil Durrant; Christian Fennesz; Cor Fuhler; Thomas Lehn; Kaffe Matthews; Jerome Noetinger; Gert-Jan Prins; Peter Rehberg; Keith Rowe; Marcus Schmickler; Rafael Toral

M.I.M.E.O. (or MIMEO) is an experimental electroacoustic free improvisation group formed in 1997 on the initiative of several independent concert promoters in Europe. The abbreviation stands for "Music In Movement Electronic Orchestra". They have issued recordings on Erstwhile Records, Cathnor, Perdition Plastics, Grob, and other labels.

Pianist John Tilbury joined the group to record the album The Hands of Caravaggio (2002, Erstwhile). AllMusic critic Brian Olewnick describes the album as "A staggering achievement, one is tempted to call The Hands of Caravaggio the first great piano concerto of the 21st century."

Their album Sight (2007) was inspired by painter Cy Twombly. Each of the eleven members of M.I.M.E.O. (spread across Europe) placed approximately five minutes of sound anywhere they chose onto a blank sixty-minute CDR. This was done independently of one another, with no communication between the musicians about how or where the music should be distributed on the disc. The CDRs were then compiled onto one CD and sent to a pressing plant.

== Members ==
Though some members have been temporarily replaced when unavailable for recording or performing, the group now consists of:

- Phil Durrant – software synth / digital sampler
- Christian Fennesz – computer
- Cor Fuhler – electronics, piano, organ
- Thomas Lehn – analogue synthesizer
- Kaffe Matthews – computer
- Jerome Noetinger – electroacoustic devices
- Gert-Jan Prins – electronics, radio, TV, percussion
- Peter Rehberg – computer
- Keith Rowe – prepared guitar
- Marcus Schmickler – computer, synthesizer
- Rafael Toral – custom electronics

== Recordings ==
- Queue (1998) Grob
- M.I.M.E.O. (Music in Movement Electronic Orchestra) (1999) Perdition Plastics
- Electric Chair + Table (2000) Grob
- The Hands of Caravaggio (2002) Erstwhile
- Lifting Concrete Lightly (2004) Serpentine Gallery
- Sight (2007) Cathnor Recordings
- Wigry (2011) Bôłt, BR LP01, Monotype Records, monoLP006
