= Thomas Lehn =

German piano and synthesizer player (born 1958)

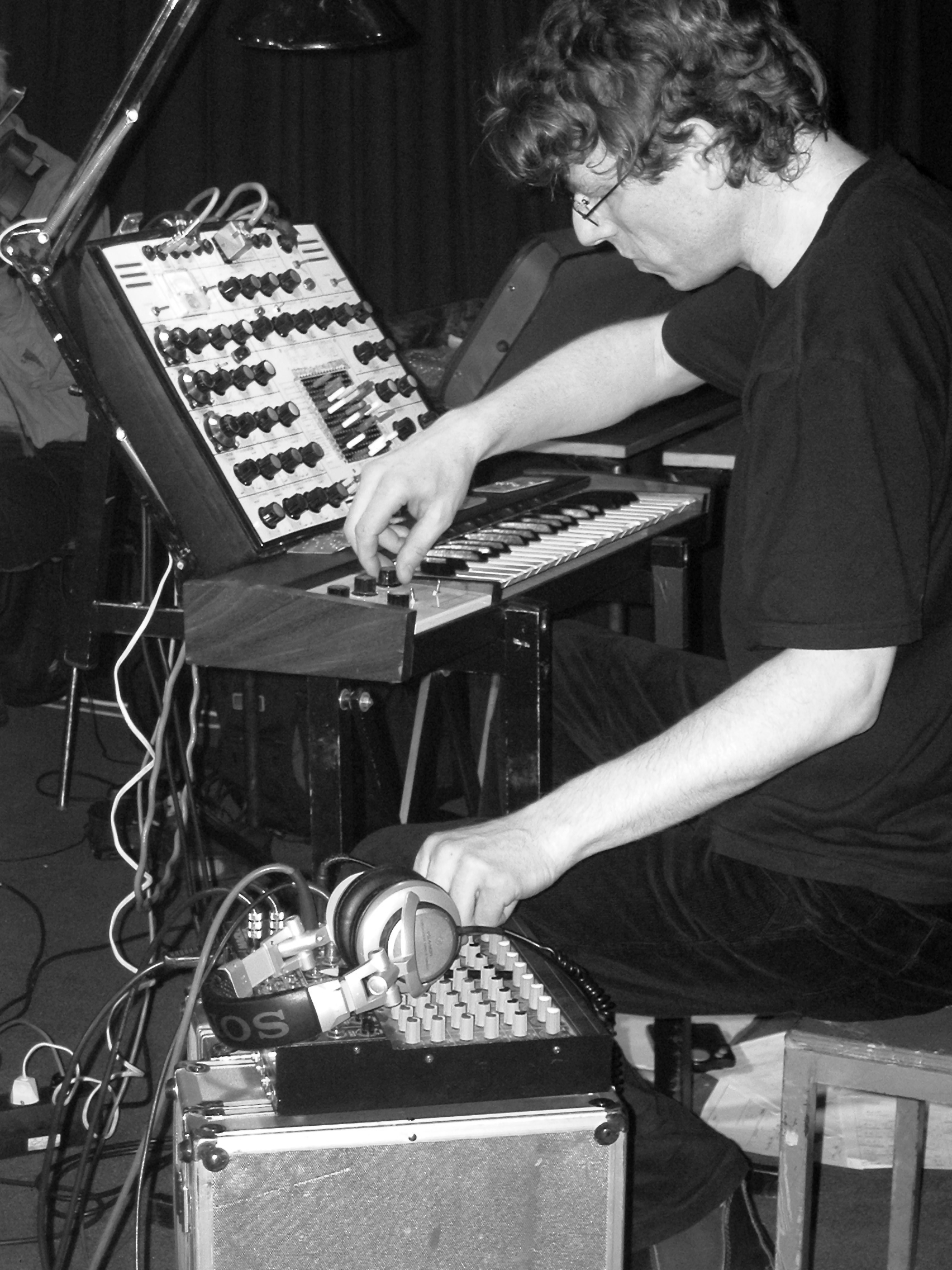
Thomas Lehn.

Thomas Lehn (born 1958 in Fröndenberg) is a German piano and synthesizer player active in free improvisation and contemporary music.

Lehn studied sound engineering in Detmold and piano in Cologne. Since 1989, he played the analog synthesizer EMS Synthi A. Lehn has recorded with Marcus Schmickler, Keith Rowe, John Butcher, Phil Minton, Phil Durrant, Radu Malfatti, Axel Dörner, Cor Fuhler, Gerry Hemingway, and Andy Moor of The Ex. He is a member of the electronic orchestra M.I.M.E.O..

In 1997 Lehn formed a free improvisation band Konk Pack. They have released three CDs.

== Discography ==
- Thermal John Butcher, Andy Moor, Thomas Lehn (2001, CD, Unsounds) OCLC 57146925
- Rabbit run, Keith Rowe, Thomas Lehn, Marcus Schmickler, 2003 OCLC 863675388
- Tangle, John Butcher, Thomas Lehn, Matthew Shipp, 2016 OCLC 1142482512

=== Konk Pack ===
- Big Deep (1999) OCLC 57525764
- Warp Out (2001) OCLC 57521841
- Off Leash (2005)
