= Cor Fuhler =

Dutch musician

- Birth name: Cornelis William Hendrik Fuhler
- Born: 3 July 1964; Barger-Oosterveld, Drenthe, Netherlands
- Died: 19 July 2020 (aged 56); Turramurra, New South Wales, Australia
- Genres: Free jazz
- Occupation(s): Improvisor, composer, and instrument builder
- Instrument(s): Piano, guitar, synthesiser
- Website: corfuhler.com

Cornelis William Hendrik Fuhler (3 July 1964 – 19 July 2020) was a Dutch/Romani improvisor, composer, and instrument builder associated with free jazz, experimental music and acoustic ecology. He played piano by manipulating sound with electromagnetic string stimulators like Ebows and motorized actuators. Fuhler also performed on guitar, turntables and synthesizer. He invented the keyolin, a combination of keyboard and violin.

Fuhler was a student of Misha Mengelberg of the Instant Composers Pool. He recorded the album Corkestra (Data, 2005) with Ab Baars, Tony Buck, Tobias Delius, Wilbert de Joode, Anne La Berge, Andy Moor, Nora Mulder, and Michael Vatcher. Fuhler played prepared piano, analog keyboards, clavinet, melodica, and electric lamellophone. Fuhler played solo prepared piano on his album Stengam (Potlatch, 2007). In 2016 he attained a PhD in composition at the University of Sydney and in 2017 he published his book Disperse and Display covering modular composing strategies and extended piano techniques.

Fuhler "died unexpectedly" at his home in Australia.

== Discography ==
- 1995 7 CC in 10 (Geestgronden)
- 1996 The Psychedelic Years Palinckx (Vonk)
- 1998 Bellagram (Geestgronden)
- 1999 DJ Cor Blimey and his Pigeon (ConundromCD)
- 2001 The Flirts (Erstwhile), duo with Gert-Jan Prins
- 2002 The Hands of Caravaggio, as part of M.I.M.E.O., featuring John Tilbury (Erstwhile)
- 2003 Tinderbox (Data)
- 2005 HHHH (Unsounds)
- 2005 ONJO (Doubtmusic)
- 2005 Corkestra (Data)
- 2007 Stengam (Potlatch)
- 2007 The Culprit, duo with Keith Rowe (7hings)
- 2011 Gas Station Sessions (Platenbakerij)
- 2014 Truancy (Splitrec)
- 2016 Mungo (Splitrec)
- 2017 FAN (SoundOut)
- 2019 Fietstour (WhirrbooM! Records)
