= Ig Henneman =

Dutch composer and bandleader (born 1945)

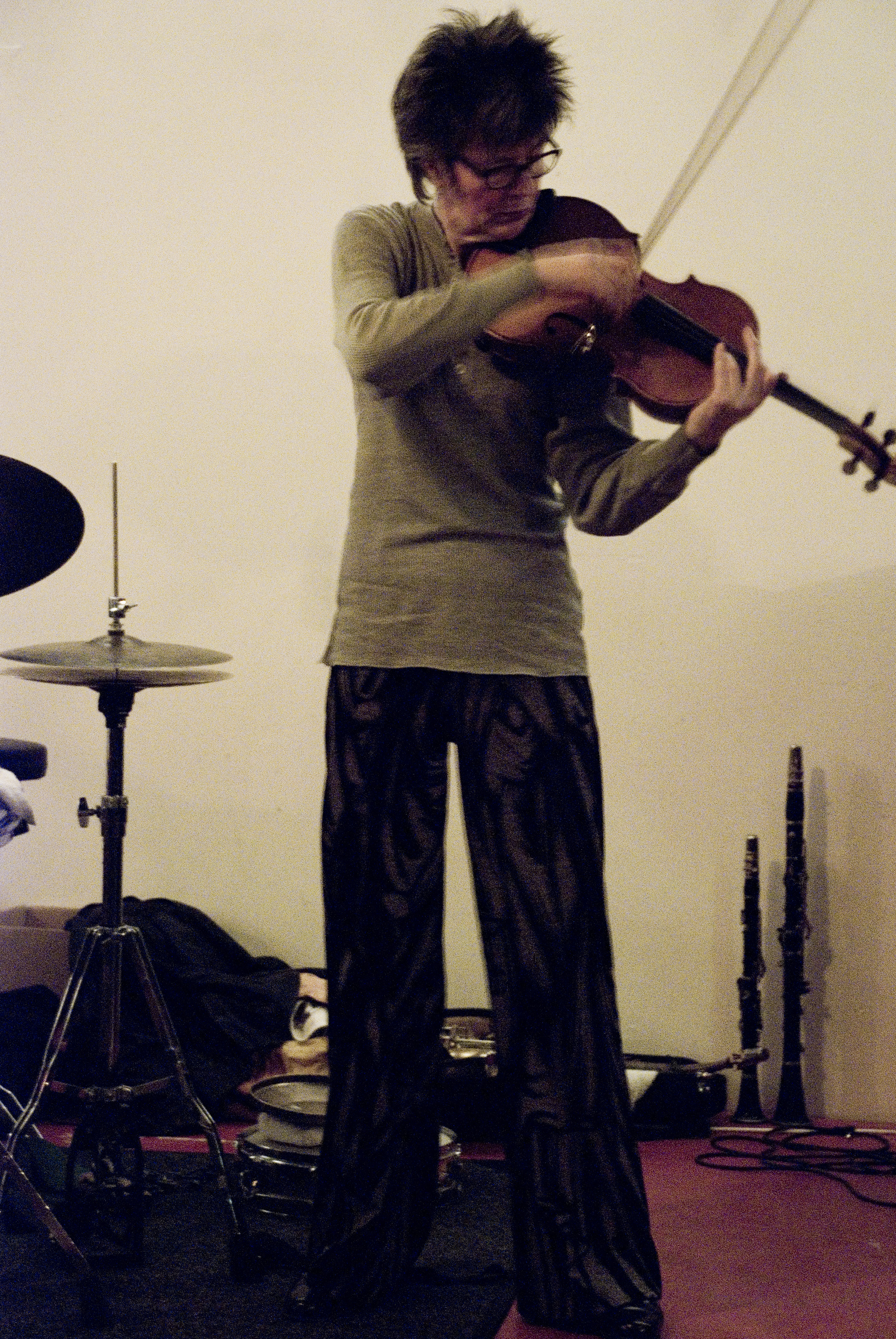
Ig Henneman

Ig Henneman (born 21 December 1945) is a Dutch composer and bandleader. She was born in Haarlem, Netherlands, and took music lessons as a child. She studied viola and violin in Amsterdam and Tilburg, and composition with Robert Heppener.

After completing her studies, Henneman worked as a violist in orchestras, and then co-founded the rock band FC Gerania where she began to compose. In 1985 she founded the Ig Henneman Quintet. She also improvises on viola with Henneman Sextet, Duo Baars-Henneman with Ab Baars and the Queen Mab Trio.

== Works ==
Henneman has composed for orchestras, ensembles and soloists, plus pieces for film and theater.

- Baby Ryazanskye film soundtrack (1927) silent movie by Olga Preobrasjenskaja
- Bow Valley Whistle for flute and samples
- Kindred Spirits improvisational project

Her work has been recorded and issued on CD, including:

- Ig Henneman Jaimie Branch Anne La Berge, Dropping Stuff and other Folk Songs (RPR 1094, Wig 29) 2019
- Ig Henneman Sextet, Cut a Caper (Wig 19) 2010
- Baars Henneman Mengelberg, Sliptong (Wig 16) 2009
- Duo Baars-Henneman, Stof (Wig 13) 2006
- Queen Mab Trio, Thin Air (Wig 14) 2006
- Queen Mab Trio, See Saw (Wig 11) 2005
