= Felix Kubin =

German musician, curator and sound and radio artist

- Born: Felix Knoth; 1969 (age 56–57); Hamburg, West Germany
- Genres: Electronic; Minimal Wave; Sound Art; Contemporary Classical
- Years active: 1981–present
- Labels: A-Musik; Gagarin Records; Bureau B Meeuw Muzak a.o.
- Website: felixkubin.com

Felix Kubin (born Felix Knoth; 1969 in Hamburg), is an electronic musician, composer, curator, sound and radio artist. He runs the record label Gagarin Records.

== Life ==
Kubin began his musical career at the age of eight with piano and electronic organ. From 1992 to 1996 he attended the Hamburg University of Applied Sciences (Hochschule für Angewandte Wissenschaften), where he studied drawing, sound installation, video and animation film. In 1995, he received a DAAD grant and spent a year at the Media Art Department of the ArtEZ Hogeschool voor de Kunsten in Enschede, Netherlands.

At the age of twelve, in 1981, he started recording his first pieces with synthesizer, organ, voice and drum machine. Two years later he began experimenting with a 4-track tape recorder. In 1983, he started the band "Die Egozentrischen 2" together with Stefan Mohr.

He was then soon discovered by the Hamburg label owner and impresario Alfred Hilsberg (ZickZack Records), who invited him to perform at various events, such as "In der Hitze der Nacht", a festival which took place in 1984 at Markthalle Hamburg. Some home recordings from this period have been included, among others, on the compilation "The Tetchy Teenage Tapes of Felix Kubin 1981–1985".

During the 1990s, Kubin began to experiment with music made from noises and released several albums with his band "Klangkrieg". From 1992 to 1994 he was a member of the dada-communist singing group "Liedertafel Margot Honecker". In 1998, the same year in which he founded his own record label Gagarin Records, he turned to avant-garde pop. In the following years he expanded his artistic spectrum through lecture performances, the development of new radio formats and contemporary compositions for chamber orchestra and electronics.

In addition to numerous publications, music releases, workshops and lectures in Germany and abroad, Felix Kubin wrote music for films and theatre productions. He performed at more than 100 international music and media art festivals such as Sónar, Unsound, Transmediale, Wien Modern, Présences électronique and Ars Electronica, but also in museums like MoMA PS1, New Museum of Contemporary Art, La Casa Encendida and Galerie nationale du Jeu de Paume.

Since 2005, Kubin has been increasingly involved with contemporary experimental music, working together with ensembles, and being invited to compose for various music halls. In 2010, in collaboration with the "ensemble Intégrales", he directed "Echohaus", a live concert for six rooms, headphone ensemble and electronics, which was premiered at the MaerzMusik Festival in Berlin. In 2013 and 2015 he was commissioned the two compositions "Chromdioxidgedächtnis" and "Takt der Arbeit" by "NDR das neue werk", a renowned radio series of contemporary music. 2016 saw the premiere of Kubin's opus magnus "Falling Still" at the Internationales Musikfest Hamburg. The orchestration of this 70min work includes string ensemble, percussion, a boys choir and live electronics. During the same year he composed music for an orchestra consisting of 20 Korg MS-20 synthesizers. The composition, by the title "A Choir of Wires", was performed by students of the LUCA School of Arts at Vooruit in Gent. In 2019 he founded the sequencer music duo CEL together with the Polish drummer Hubert Zemler. At the same time he began a collaboration with the Hamburg based Ensemble Resonanz that led to the composition of the pieces "Lunar Plexus" and "Telephobie".

French film director Marie Losier portrayed Felix Kubin in the award-winning film "Felix in Wonderland", which premiered at the Locarno Film Festival in 2019.

== Genre ==
Felix Kubin ́s music is influenced by the early Neue Deutsche Welle (NDW), as well as contemporary classical and film music of the 20th century. A significant connection to Neue Deutsche Welle (in which he couldn't actively participate as he was too young) can also be noticed in his surrealist German lyrics, which are wild, poetic and open to interpretation.

== Radio ==
Since 2001 Felix Kubin has been involved with radio, producing many plays and features (Hörspiel), which can be divided into three categories:

- Radio plays which combine documentary footage with studio recordings in a fictional context, and therefore go beyond the classic feature style (Paralektronoia, Wiederhole 1–8, Syndikat für Gegenlärm, Mother in the fridge)
- Dramatic Radio Plays (Orpheus' Psykotron, Orphée Mécanique, Die Machine steht still)
- Sound Art (Nachtspeicher, Territerrortorium, Säugling, Duschkopf, Damenschritte)

Felix Kubin's radio play Orphée Mécanique has been awarded "Hörspiel des Jahres" in 2012 and "Best Audiobook" 2013/14 (Deutscher Hörbuchpreis).

From 2010 to 2011, commissioned by Radio Web MACBA, he produced two podcast series: Parasol Elektroniczny – Rumours from the Eastern Underground, and Deutsche Kassettentäter – the rise of the German home-recording tape scene. The latter was also reflected in a compilation that he curated for the UK label Finders Keepers Records in 2014. Between 2015 and 2017, Kubin has been host and co-creator of the NDR radio show Toxic Tunes, a live recorded programme of experimental music and artist talks presented at Resonanzraum Hamburg. In 2017, he conceived the show "Me & My Rhythm Box" for Savvy Funk as part of the dOCUMENTA 14 exhibition. In 20 episodes, the show featured artists such as Sven-Åke Johansson, Andrea Neumann and Alessandro Bosetti who presented their self-built instruments live on air. Together with Felix Raeithel, he runs the conceptual DJ project Demo Dandies, a format that exclusively features demo tapes of the audience and listeners.

== Film and theatre music ==
Kubin worked for theatre in collaboration with other artists such as Christoph Schlingensief („Atta Atta", Volksbühne Berlin, 2003), Mariola Brillowska („House of National Dog“, Kampnagel Hamburg, 2007), Schorsch Kamerun („Hollywood Elegien“, Ruhrtriennale Essen, 2002, „Des Kaisers Neue Kleider“, Schauspiel Köln, 2010) and Robert Florczak („Macbeth“, Shakespeare Festival, Danzig 2010). He composed music for animated films by Mariola Brillowska, Martha Colburn and Anke Feuchtenberger, as well as for the experimental short film “Terminal" by Jörg Wagner. He also wrote "propaganda film" screenplays for the dada-communist art party KED (Kommunistische Einheitspartei Deutschlands) and produced short films that ran at international festivals and on television. In 2023 he composed two soundtracks for the ARTE series "Female Comedies".

== Awards ==
- Honorary Mention for the CD „Matki Wandalki“ at the Prix Ars Electronica, Digital Musics category, 2004
- Best electronic live act at the 2nd Qwartz Electronic Music Awards, Paris
- International Short Film Festival Oberhausen 1° Prize MuVi-Preis at the International Short Film Festival Oberhausen 2010 for the Music video „Lightning Strikes“
- Prix Phonurgia Nova for „Säugling, Duschkopf, Damenschritte", Arles, 2011
- Hörspiel des Monats March, Hörspiel des Jahres 2012, Deutscher Hörbuchpreis 2014 for „Orphée Mécanique“
- Das kurze brennende Mikro at the Berliner Hörspielfestival for „Frau Ausweis", Berlin 2015
- ARD Online-Award 2018 for „Die Maschine steht still" based on Story by Edward Morgan Forster (NDR)

== Discography ==
- Antarktis Slow Rock – 7" (1998; Meeuw Muzak)
- Filmmusik – LP/CD (1998; Gagarin Records, A-Musik)
- Die Pein vom Haupt entfernen – LP/zootrope object (1999; Rund um den Watzmann)
- Jane B. ertrinkt mit den Pferden – 10" (2000; Diskono)
- Tesla's Aquarium (with Pia Burnette) – LP (2000; Storage)
- Schnitzler – 7" (2000; pop'eclectic)
- Ipsomat Legrand (with Günther Reznicek, Mark Mancha) – 10" (2001; Disaster Area)
- Jetlag Disco – EP/3"CD (2001; A-Musik)
- Superlake Beat (with Aavikko) – 7" (2001; Diskono)
- The Tetchy Teenage Tapes of Felix Kubin 1981–1985 – LP/CD (2002; A-Musik, Skipp)
- I hate art galleries (with Mark Boombastik) – 7" (2003; Meeuw Muzak)
- Die kulturelle Revolution – 7" (2003; A-Musik)
- Matki Wandalki – LP/CD (2004; A-Musik)
- Der Aufstand der Chemiker (die Egozentrischen 2) – LP (2004; Was soll das? Schallplatten)
- Idiotenmusik – 7" (2005; Ultraeczema)
- Territerrortorium (with Wojtek Kucharczyk) – 7" (2005; Gagarin Rec. + Mik.Musik)
- Anaerobic Robots (with Mark Boombastik, Jake Basker) – EP (2005; Gagarin Records)
- Atoma Exi Mono, compilation – CD (2006; Solnze)
- There is a garden (with Coolhaven) – 7" (2006; A-Musik)
- Suppe für die Nacht (with Coolhaven) – CD (2006; Kormplastics)
- House of National Dog (with Mariola Brillowska) – CD (2007; A-Musik)
- Detached from all objects (with Pia Burnette) – LP/CD (2007; Gagarin Records + Stora)
- The Pataphysical Tape Club (Split-LP with IFCO) – LP/art mag. (2007; BIGMAG#2)
- Axolotl Lullabies – CD/LP (2007; Oral)
- Felix Kubin & das Mineralorchester: music for theatre and radio play – CD/LP (2008; Dekorder)
- Die Inhaberin des Chlorophyllmandats überwacht den Ausgleich von Licht und Schatten – Cassette Tape (2008; ALKU)
- Felix Kubin, compilation – CD (2009; Nuevos Ricos)
- Bruder Luzifer 1982–2010, compilation – CD (2010; The Omni Recording Corporation)
- Echohaus (with ensemble Intégrales) – 2LP/CD (2010; Dekorder)
- Fog Frog (with Max Goldt, Mark Boombastik) – 7" (2011; Meeuw Muzak)
- TXRF – 2LP/CD (2012; it's)
- Teenage Tapes – LP/DL (2012; Minimal Wave)
- Orphée Mécanique – CD (2012; Intermedium Records / Belville)
- Zemsta Plutona – LP/CD/DL (2013; Gagarin Records, ZickZack)
- Bakterien & Batterien (with Mitch & Mitch) – LP/CD (2013; Gagarin Records, Lado ABC)
- Disco 2100 / Antarktis Slow Rock / Hotel Super Nova (with Mitch & Mitch) – 12" EP (2014; Gagarin Records, Lado ABC)
- Chromdioxidgedächtnis – CD+MC (2014; Gagarin Records)
- 1:17 (with Scott Haggart, Lary 7) – LP (2014; Gagarin Records)
- Taucher – 12" Maxi (2015; it's)
- Felix Kubin & das Mineralorchester II: Music for Film and Theatre – LP/DD (2016; Dekorder)
- Shine on you crazy diagram (Split-LP with Splitter Orchester) – LP/DD (2016; Gagarin Records)
- Coughs and Sneezes – 8" Picture Disc (2016; Hasenbart)
- Takt der Arbeit (with Miłosz Pękala, Magdalena Kordylasińska, Hubert Zemler) – LP/DD (2017; Editions Mego)
- Morgenröte / Aus Gold modelliert die Nacht – 7" in blau/türkis (2018; Psychofon Records)
- Max Brand Studie IV / Topia – LP/DD (2019; V I S)
- Die Maschine steht still – CD (2019; DAV)
- CEL (Felix Kubin & Hubert Zemler) – LP/CD/DD (2020; Bureau B)
- Wir triumphieren - Bergedorfs Kinderbandszene 1981-86, compilation (V.A.) – 2LP (2022; Minimalkombinat)
- Gegenwelt (CEL) – LP/CD/DD (2023; Bureau B)
- Der Aufstand der Chemiker, re-issue (Die Egozentrischen 2) – CD (2023; Suezan Studio)
- The Tetchy Teenage Tapes of Felix Kubin 1981–1985, re-issue – CD (2023; Suezan Studio)

== List of radio plays ==
- Syndikat für Gegenlärm, DLR Berlin (2001)
- Nachtspeicher, WDR, by Felix Kubin and Boris D. Hegenbart (2003)
- Molaradio, by Felix Kubin and Vicki Bennett, published by FACT Collaboration Program, Liverpool (UK). (2004)
- PLOPP! 2003 – Akustische Schnittblumen, SWF (2004)
- Territerrortorium, ORF/DLR Berlin, by Felix Kubin and Wojtek Kucharczyk (2004)
- Paralektronoia, WDR 1 Live (2004)
- Orpheus’ Psykotron, BR (2006)
- The Pataphysical Tape Club, Audiotoop III Festival für Live-Hörspiele (2006/2007)
- Wiederhole 1–8, WDR 1 Live (2008)
- Säugling, Duschkopf, Damenschritte, Author production (Ersts. Deutschlandradio Kultur) (2010)
- Parasol Elektroniczny – rumours from the eastern underground, MACBA Barcelona (2010–2012)
- Orphée Mécanique, BR (2012), published in 2013 by Intermedium/Belleville
- Mother in the Fridge, Author production (2012)
- Frau Ausweis, Author production (2014)
- Phantomspeisung, BR (2017)
- Die Maschine steht still, NDR (2018)
- Phantom Frequencies, Institut International de Recherche sur la Radio et la Magie (2020)
- Forum für Entladung, ORF Ö1 Kunstradio (2022)
- The Speaking Clock, Radio Art Zone, Luxembourg (2022)
- Weltsendeschluss, DLR Berlin / ORF (2023)
